= 2008 in Spanish television =

This is a list of Spanish television related events in 2008.

== Events ==
- Unknown: TV channel RAC 105 TV starts broadcasting.
- 28 January: Matías Prats becomes first Spanish journalist having hosted 7.000 News programs.
- 17 February: TV Channel Telecinco Sport stops broadcasting and is replaced by Telecinco 2.
- 18 February: TV Channel Factoría de Ficción starts broadcasting.
- 12 April: TV channel Animax starts broadcasting.
- 29 June: Broadcasting of the final of UEFA Euro 2008 between Spain and Germany, by Cuatro is followed by 14.482.000 viewers (80.9% share).
- 30 June: Television channel Fly Music stops broadcasting.
- 1 September: TVE shows its new corporate image.
- 19 September:
  - TV channel GOL TV starts broadcasting.
  - A judge in Barcelona issues a sentence according to which La Sexta is prohibited from showing image previously broadcast by Telecinco.
- 10 October: TV channel ETB 3 starts broadcasting.
- 3 November: TV channel Antena 3 Canarias starts broadcasting.
- 27 November: European Commission reportes Spain to the Luxembourg Court for Spanish TV channels exceeding 12 minutes of advertising per hour.

== Debuts ==
Title	Channel	Debut	Performers/Host / Intérprete	Genre
18, la serie	Antena 3	2008-12-18	Elsa Pinilla	Drama Series
20-N: los últimos días de Franco	Antena 3	2008-11-20	Manuel Alexandre	Telefilm
700 euros, diario secreto de una call girl	Antena 3	2008-07-29	Mercè Llorens	Drama Series
9 de cada 10	TVE-1	2008-03-12	Toni Clapés	Late Night
Ajuste de cuentas	Cuatro	2008-04-04	Vicens Castellano	Variety Show
Balas de plata	La 1	2008-04-03	Lorena Berdún	Talk Show
Barras	Antena 3	2008-07-14	Óscar Terol	Sitcom
Canta! Singstar	TVE-1	2008-07-16	Carlos Sobera	Talent Show
Cazadores de hombres	Antena 3	2008-10-07	Emma Suárez	Drama Series
Celebrities	La Sexta	2008-03-23	Martina Klein	Gossip Show
Circus, más difícil todavía	Cuatro	2008-09-12	Josep Lobató	Talent show
Comando actualidad	La 1	2008-03-11		Documentary
Con un par...de bromas	La 1	2008-08-28	Javier Capitán	Videos
De patitas en la calle	La Sexta	2008-09-07	Carolina Ferre	Reality Show
El día por delante	La 1	2008-05-24	Inés Ballester	Variety Show
El Diario	Antena 3	2008-09-22	Sandra Daviú	Talk Show
En lengua de signos	La 2	2008-02-02	Paloma Soroa	News Magazine
En noches como ésta	La 1	2008-09-18	Juan Ramón Lucas	Talk Show
Esta mañana	La 1	2008-03-24	Pepa Bueno	Variety Show
Estados alterados Maitena	La Sexta	2008-10-27	María Adánez	Sitcom
Estas no son las noticias	Cuatro	2008-09-22	Quequé	Comedy
Fábrica de ideas	La 2	2008-10-24	Sandra Barneda	Science/Culture
Fago	TVE-1	2008-03-10	Jordi Rebellón	Drama Series
Fama, ¡a bailar!	Cuatro	2008-01-07	Paula Vázquez	Talent show
Fama School	Cuatro	2008-05-05	Paula Vázquez	Talent show
Fichados	Antena 3	2008-11-24		Comedy
Fifty Fifty	Cuatro	2008-07-01	Silvia Jato	Quiz Show
Física o química	Antena 3	2008-02-04	Ana Milán	Drama Series
Fuera de lugar	La 1	2008-05-05	Lola Herrera	Sitcom
Futuro: 48 horas	Antena 3	2008-07-02	Andoni Gracia	Telefilm
Las gafas de Angelino	Telecinco	2008-03-31	Carmen Alcayde	Comedy
El Gran Quiz	Cuatro	2008-05-04	Nuria Roca	Quiz Show
Guante blanco	La 1	2008-10-15	Carlos Hipólito	Drama Series
Guaypaut	Telecinco	2008-12-24	Carmen Alcayde	Game Show
La guerra de los mandos	La 1	2008-07-21	Inma del Moral	Videos
Hijos de Babel	La 1	2008-01-22	Antonio Garrido	Talent Show
HKM	Cuatro	2008-12-08	Sara Da Pin Up	Drama Series
[Impares	Antena 3	2008-08-04	Marta Hazas	Sitcom
El juego de tu vida	Telecinco	2008-04-02	Emma García	Game Show
Lalola	Antena 3	2008-07-06	Marina Gatell	Soap Opera
LEX	Antena 3	2008-06-05	Javier Cámara	Drama Series
La lista	La 1	2008-08-01	Daniel Domenjó	Quiz Show
La noche en 24 horas	24 horas	2008-09-12	Vicente Vallés	News Magazine
El método Gonzo	Antena 3	2008-06-16	Fernando González «Gonzo»	News Magazine
El método por dos	Antena 3	2008-09-08	Silvia Salgado	News Magazine
Mi gemela es hija única	Telecinco	2008-12-09	Alejandra Lorente	Sitcom
Mujeres y hombres y viceversa	Telecinco	2008-06-09	Emma García	Dating show
El muro infernal	La Sexta	2008-06-19	Julián Iantzi	Game Show
No es programa para viejos	Antena 3	2008-09-08	Patricia Gaztañaga	Talk Show
No te olvides la canción	La Sexta	2008-09-26	Àngel Llàcer	Quiz Show
O el perro o yo	Cuatro	2008-06-01	Victoria Stilwell	Science/Culture
Ola, ola	Cuatro	2008-08-01		Documentary
Operación Tony Manero	Telecinco	2008-06-09	Christian Gálvez	Talent show
Password	Cuatro	2008-07-07	Luján Argüelles	Quiz Show
Peking Express	Cuatro	2008-12-14	Paula Vázquez	Game Show
Peta-Zetas	Antena 3	2008-01-14	José Corbacho	Variety Show
Plan América	La 1	2008-04-07	José Sancho	Drama Series
Plutón BRB Nero	La 2	2008-09-24	Carlos Areces	Sitcom
Qué vida más triste	La Sexta	2008-10-19	Borja Pérez	Sitcom
¡Quiero bailar!	TVE-1	2008-06-14	Josep Lobató	Talent Show
Réplica	Telecinco	2008-04-03	Carlos Latre	Comedy
Rojo y negro	Telecinco	2008-11-12	Nacho Abad	News Magazine
RTVE Responde	La 2	2008-04-30	Elena Sánchez	Public Service
El sacapuntas	Antena 3	2008-07-16	Ricardo Castella	Comedy
Salud a la carta	La Sexta	2008-10-06	Txumari Alfaro	Science/Culture
Salvados	La Sexta	2008-02-24	Jordi Évole	Talk Show
La Señora	La 1	2008-03-06	Adriana Ugarte	Drama Series
Sin tetas no hay no paraíso	Telecinco	2008-01-08	Amaia Salamanca	Drama Series
Soy el Solitario	Antena 3	2008-01-16	Emilio Gutiérrez Caba	Drama Series
Tal cual lo contamos	Antena 3	2008-10-12	Cristina Lasvignes	Variety Show
La tira	La Sexta	2008-05-12	Kira Miró	Sitcom
Tienes Talento	Cuatro	2008-01-25	Nuria Roca	Talent Show
Tres deseos	Antena 3	2008-03-05	Jaime Cantizano	Variety Show
Tú sí que vales	Telecinco	2008-01-01	Christian Gálvez	Talent Show
Valanota	Telecinco	2008-07-14	Óscar Martínez	Comedy
Ven a cenar conmigo	Antena 3	2008-06-02		Quiz Show
Visto y Oído	Cuatro	2008-06-30	Raquel Sánchez-Silva	Variety Show
Xq no te callas	Telecinco	2008-09-05	Carolina Cerezuela	Comedy
Ya te vale	La 1	2008-04-11	Gemma Nierga	Talk Show
Yo estuve allí	La 1	2008-03-15	Carolina Ferre	Variety Show

== Television shows ==
- La 1
  - Telediario (1957– )
  - Informe Semanal (1973– )
  - Parlamento (1978–2014)
  - Corazón, Corazón (1993–2010)
  - Cartelera (1994–2009)
  - Los Desayunos de TVE (1994–2020)
  - Cine de barrio (1995– )
  - Gente (1995–2011)
  - Corazón (1997– )
  - Saber vivir (1997–2009)
  - El Conciertazo (2000–2009)
  - Cuéntame cómo pasó (2001– )
  - 59 segundos (2004–2012)
  - Destino Eurovisión (2004–2013)
  - ¡Mira quién baila! (2005–2009)
  - España Directo (2005–2022)
  - Amar en tiempos revueltos (2005–2012)
  - Herederos (2007–2009)
  - Tengo una pregunta para usted (2007–2011)
- Antena 3
  - Antena 3 Noticias (1990– )
  - Club Megatrix (1995–2013)
  - Espejo público (1996– )
  - ¿Dónde estás, corazón? (2003–2011)
  - Art Attack (2005–2009)
  - Los Hombres de Paco (2005–2010)
  - La ruleta de la fortuna (2006– )
  - La Familia Mata (2007–2009)
  - Esta casa era una ruina (2007–2010)
  - El Internado (2007–2010)
  - Locos por la tele (2007–2010)
- La 2
  - Al filo de lo imposble (1982– )
  - Pueblo de Dios (1982– )
  - Últimas preguntas (1983– )
  - En portada (1984– )
  - Metrópolis (1985– )
  - Documentos TV (1986– )
  - Tendido cero (1986– )
  - Días de cine (1991– )
  - La Aventura del saber (1992– )
  - Jara y sedal (1992– )
  - Zona ACB (1993–2010)
  - La 2 noticias (1994–2020)
  - La noche temática, (1995– )
  - Redes (1996–2013)
  - Agrosfera (1997– )
  - El escarabajo verde (1997– )
  - Saber y ganar (1997– )
  - La Mandrágora (1997–2009)
  - El Cine de La 2 (1998– )
  - Versión española (1998– )
  - Aquí hay trabajo (2000– )
  - España en comunidad (2000–2020)
  - Shalom (2003– )
  - Los Lunnis (2003–2010)
  - Padres en apuros (2003–2010)
  - Pocoyo (2005– )
  - Con todos los acentos (2005–2009)
  - Palabra por palabra (2005–2011)
  - Leonart (2006–2009)
  - Cámara abierta 2.0 (2007–)
  - Página 2 (2007– )
  - No disparen al pianista (2007–2009)
  - Muchachada Nui (2007–2010)
  - Tres14 (2007–2014)
- Cuatro
  - Cuarto milenio (2005– )
  - Corta-t (2005–2009)
  - Callejeros (2005–2014)
  - Noticias Cuatro (2005–2019)
  - El Hormiguero (2006–2011)
  - Supernanny (2006–2017)
  - Las mañanas de Cuatro (2006–2018)
  - Desafío extremo (2007–2014)
- Telecinco
  - Informativos Telecinco (1990– )
  - La Mirada crítica (1998–2009)
  - El comisario (1999–2009)
  - Nosolomúsica (1999–2012)
  - Survivor Spain (2000– )
  - Hospital Central (2000–2012)
  - Big Brother Spain (2000–2017)
  - Bricomanía (2005–2010)
  - Decogarden (2005–2010)
  - Operación Triunfo (2005–2011)
  - Karlos Arguiñano en tu cocina (2004–2010)
  - Diario de (2004–2011)
  - Gran Hermano VIP (2004–2019)
  - El Programa de Ana Rosa (2005– )
  - Camera Café (2005–2009)
  - Aída (2005–2014)
  - Pasapalabra (2007–2019)
  - Survivor Spain (2006– )
  - El buscador de historias (2006–2009)
  - Yo soy Bea (2006–2009)
  - La que se avecina (2007– )
  - Está pasando (2007–2009)
  - Hermanos y Detectives (2007–2009)
  - Escenas de Matrimonio (2007–2010)
  - Hormigas blancas (2007–2011)
  - La Noria (2007–2012)
  - Pasapalabra (2007–2019)
- La Sexta
  - El Intermedio (2006– )
  - La Sexta Noticias (2006– )
  - Hoy cocinas tú (2006–2009)
  - Todos ahhh 100 (2006–2009)
  - Sé lo que hicisteis... (2006–2011)
  - Buenafuente (2007–2011)
  - Minuto y resultado (2007–2012)

== Ending this year ==
- La 1
  - Por la mañana (2002–2008)
  - Emprendedores (2005–2008)
  - El coro de la cárcel (2006–2008)
  - Desaparecida (2007–2008)
  - Identity (2007–2008)
- La 2
  - Club de fútbol (2007–2008)
  - En otras palabras (1997–2008)
- Antena 3
  - El Diario de Patricia (2001–2008)
  - ¿Quién quiere ser millonario? (2005–2008)
  - 360 grados (2007–2008)
  - A 3 bandas (2007–2008)
  - Al pie de la letra (2007–2008)
  - ¿Sabes más que un niño de primaria? (2007–2008)
  - El Síndrome de Ulises (2007–2008)
- Cuatro
  - Channel nº4 (2005–2008)
  - Noche Hache (2005–2008)
  - Las noticias del guiñol (2005–2008)
  - Nada x aquí (2006–2008)
  - Supermodelo (2006–2008)
  - Alta tensión(2006–2008)
- Brainiac (2007–2008)
- Factor X (2007–2008)
  - Money, Money (2007–2008)
  - El Sexómetro (2007–2008)
  - SOS Adolescentes (2007–2008)
- Telecinco
  - Caiga quien caiga (1996–2008)
  - Aquí hay tomate (2003–2008)
  - Los Serrano (2003–2008)
  - ¡Allá tú! (2004–2008)
  - Birlokus klub (2004–2008)
  - Dutifrí(2007–2008)D
  - MIR (2007–2008)
  - El Ventilador(2007–2008)
- La Sexta
  - Apuesta en 20" (2006–2008)
  - Diario del Analista Catódico (2006–2008)
  - No me digas que no te gusta el fútbol (2006–2008)
  - No sabe, no contesta (2006–2008)
  - Cocina con Bruno (2007–2008)
  - La Ventana Indiscreta (2007–2008)

== Changes of network affiliation ==
Show	Moved From	Moved To
Caiga quien caiga (1996–2010)	Telecinco	La Sexta

== Foreign series debuts in Spain ==
English title	Spanish title	Channel	Country	Performers
Californication	Californication	Cuatro	USA	David Duchovny
Dexter	Dexter	Cuatro	USA	Michael C. Hall
Dirty Sexy Money	Sexy Money	Antena 3	USA	Peter Krause
Jekyll	Jekill	Cuatro	UK	James Nesbitt
Life	Life	Telecinco	USA	Damian Lewis
Phineas and Ferb	Phineas y Ferb	Cuatro	USA	
Primeval	Mundo Primitivo	Cuatro	UK	Douglas Henshall
Private Practice	Sin cita previa	Antena 3	USA	Kate Walsh
Saved	Saved	La Sexta	USA	Tom Everett Scott
The Company	The Company	Cuatro	USA	Chris O'Donnell
The Dresden Files	Dresden	Cuatro	CAN USA	Paul Blackthorne
Ugly Betty	Ugly Betty	Cuatro	USA	America Ferrera

== Deaths ==
- 6 February – Juan Antonio Fernández Abajo, host, 69.
- 11 April – Juan Ramón Sánchez, actor, 51.
- 15 April – Conchita Bardem, actress, 90.
- 23 September – Pedro Masó, director, 81.
- 13 November – Julio Riscal, actor, 80.
- 15 December – Ángel Quesada, host, 59.

== See also ==
- 2008 in Spain
- List of Spanish films of 2008
