= Mask Singer: Adivina quién canta season 4 =

Mask Singer: Adivina quién canta
- Season 4
- Hosted by: Arturo Valls
- Judges: Javier Ambrossi; Javier Calvo; Alaska; Ana Milán
- No. of contestants: 16
- Winner: Abraham Mateo as "Mosca"
- Runner-up: Adriana Ugarte as "Cobra"
- Location: Madrid
- No. of episodes: 8

Release
- Original network: Antena 3
- Original release: 16 October – 11 December 2024

Season chronology
- ← Previous; Season 3 Next → Season 5

The fourth season of Spanish reality show singer competition Mask Singer: Adivina quién canta premiered on 16 October 2024.

== Panelists and host ==
Arturo Valls continued hosting the show for its fourth season, with regular panelists Javier Calvo and Javier Ambrossi also set to return. Season 3 contestants Alaska and Ana Milán joined the panel for this season, replacing Ana Obregón and Mónica Naranjo.

== Contestants ==
Twelve of the sixteen competing masks were revealed before the premiere.

Stage name	Celebrity	Occupation	Episodes								
Stage name	Celebrity	Occupation	1	2	3	4	5	6	7	8	
Stage name	Celebrity	Occupation	1	2	3	4	5	6	7	A	B
Mosca (Fly)	Abraham Mateo	Singer/Actor	SAFE		SAFE		SAFE		RISK	WIN	WINNER
Cobra (WC)	Adriana Ugarte	Actress				SAFE		SAFE	WIN	RISK	RUNNER-UP
Tiburón (Shark)	Manuel Díaz "El Cordobés"	Bullfighter	SAFE		SAFE		SAFE		RISK	THIRD	
Rinoceronte (Rhino)	Esther Cañadas	Top model		SAFE		SAFE		SAFE	OUT		
Helado (Ice Cream)	Ana Peleteiro	Triple jumper		SAFE		SAFE		OUT			
Churros	Antonio Lobato	Sports journalist		SAFE		SAFE		OUT			
Piña (Pineapple) (WC)	Glòria Serra	Journalist			SAFE		OUT				
Corazón (Heart)	Ana Boyer	Socialite	SAFE		SAFE		OUT				
Corazón (Heart)	Fernando Verdasco	Former tennis player	SAFE		SAFE		OUT				
Troll (WC)	Bárbara Rey	Actress				OUT					
Hipopótamo (Hippo)	David Hasselhoff	Actor		SAFE		OUT (Note: All panelists used El Delatador and correctly guessed the celebrity's identity, causing the latter to be unmasked immediately)					
Oveja (Sheep)	María José Campanario	Media personality	SAFE		OUT						
Brócoli (Broccoli) (WC)	Miguel Ángel Revilla	Politician			OUT						
Patita de Goma (Rubber Ducky)	Manuela Carmena	Judge/Former mayor		OUT							
Aguacate (Avocado)	José Luis Rodríguez "El Puma"	Singer		OUT							
Palomitas (Popcorn)	Ana Obregón	Actress	OUT								
Panda	Carl Lewis	Former athlete	OUT								

== Episodes ==
=== Week 1 (October 16) ===
Performances on the first episode
#	Stage name	Song	Identity	Result
1	Sheep	"DISCOTEKA" by Lola Índigo and Maria Becerra	undisclosed	SAFE
2	Panda	"Y.M.C.A." by Village People	Carl Lewis	OUT
3	Fly	"As It Was" by Harry Styles	undisclosed	SAFE
4	Heart	"You're the One That I Want" by John Travolta and Olivia Newton-John	undisclosed	SAFE
5	Shark	"El Tiburón" by Henry Méndez	undisclosed	SAFE
6	Popcorn	"Flowers" by Miley Cyrus	Ana Obregón	DELETE

=== Week 2 (October 23) ===
Performances on the second episode
#	Stage name	Song	Identity	Result
1	Avocado	"Vagabundo" by Sebastián Yatra	José Luis Rodríguez	OUT
2	Hippo	"Old Time Rock & Roll" by Bob Seger	undisclosed	SAFE
3	Ice Cream	"Nochentera" by Vicco	undisclosed	SAFE
4	Churros	"Counting Stars" by OneRepublic	undisclosed	SAFE
5	Rhino	"Sarà perché ti amo" by Ricchi e Poveri	undisclosed	SAFE
6	Rubber Ducky	"19 Días Y 500 Noches" by María Jiménez	Manuela Carmena	OUT

=== Week 3 (November 6) ===
Performances on the third episode
#	Stage name	Song	Identity	Result
1	Fly	"I Want to Break Free" by Queen	undisclosed	SAFE
2	Heart	"La Bicicleta" by Carlos Vives and Shakira	undisclosed	SAFE
3	Broccoli	"Quevedo: Bzrp Music Sessions, Vol. 52" by Bizarrap and Quevedo	Miguel Ángel Revilla	OUT
4	Pineapple	"Cuff It" by Beyoncé	undisclosed	SAFE
5	Shark	"El Fin del Mundo" by La La Love You	undisclosed	SAFE
6	Sheep	“Let Me Out" by Dover	María José Campanario	OUT

=== Week 4 (November 13) ===
Performances on the fourth episode
#	Stage name	Song	Identity	Result
1	Rhino	"It's My Life" by Bon Jovi	undisclosed	SAFE
2	Cobra	"Hot n Cold" by Katy Perry	undisclosed	SAFE
3	Hippo	"Baby Don't Hurt Me" by Anne-Marie, Coi Leray, & David Guetta	David Hasselhoff	DELETE
4	Troll	"Despechá" by Rosalía	Bárbara Rey	OUT
5	Churros	"Dile a los Demás" by Dani Fernández	undisclosed	SAFE
6	Ice Cream	"Made You Look" by Meghan Trainor	undisclosed	SAFE

=== Week 5 (November 20) ===
- Pilar Rubio appeared as a guest investigator.

Performances on the fifth episode
#	Stage name	Song	Identity	Result
1	Pineapple	"Shakira: Bzrp Music Sessions, Vol. 53" by Bizarrap and Shakira	undisclosed	SAFE
2	Fly	"What Makes You Beautiful" by One Direction	undisclosed	SAFE
3	Shark	"La Bachata" by Manuel Turizo	undisclosed	SAFE
4	Heart	"El Tonto" by Lola Indigo & Quevedo	Ana Boyer & Fernando Verdasco	OUT
Final round			Identity	Result
1	Shark	"Ahora Quien" by Marc Anthony	undisclosed	SAFE
2	Pineapple	"Feel This Moment" by Christina Aguilera ft Pitbull	Glòria Serra	OUT
3	Fly	"Corazón Partío" by Alejandro Sanz	undisclosed	SAFE

=== Week 6 (November 27) ===
- Paco León appeared as a guest investigator.

Performances on the sixth episode
#	Stage name	Song	Identity	Result
1	Churros	"Quién Diría" by Depol	Antonio Lobato	OUT
2	Ice Cream	"Mariposas" by Aitana & Sangiovanni	undisclosed	SAFE
3	Rhino	"Arrasando" by Thalía	undisclosed	SAFE
4	Cobra	"I Wanna Dance with Somebody" by Whitney Houston	undisclosed	SAFE
Final round			Identity	Result
1	Ice Cream	"Tuya" by Rosalía	Ana Peleteiro	OUT
2	Rhino	"Música Ligera" by Ana Mena	undisclosed	SAFE
3	Cobra	"22" by Taylor Swift	undisclosed	SAFE

=== Week 7 (December 4) - Semifinals ===
- Chenoa, Ruth Lorenzo, David Bustamante and Álvaro Soler performed in duets alongside the remaining masks.

Performances on the seventh episode
#	Stage name	Song	Duet Partner	Result
1	Rhino	"Bailar Contigo" by Chenoa	Chenoa	RISK
2	Cobra	"Good Girls Don't Lie" by Ruth Lorenzo	Ruth Lorenzo	WIN
3	Fly	"Dos Hombres y un Destino" by Bustamante	David Bustamante	RISK
4	Shark	"Oxigeno" by Álvaro Soler	Álvaro Soler	RISK
Final round			Identity	Result
1	Fly	"Moves like Jagger" by Maroon 5	undisclosed	SAFE
2	Rhino	"Let's Get Loud" by Jennifer Lopez	Esther Cañadas	OUT
3	Shark	"Llámame" by WRS	undisclosed	SAFE

=== Week 8 (December 11) - Finale ===
Performances on the eighth episode
#	Stage name	Song	Result	
1	Shark	"Enamorado de la moda juvenil" by Radio Futura	RISK	
2	Fly	"Stayin' Alive" by Bee Gees	WIN	
3	Cobra	"Las 12" by Ana Mena & Belinda	RISK	
Smackdown			Identity	Result
1	Cobra	"Bailando" by Alaska	undisclosed	SAFE
2	Shark	"Como Si Fueras a Morir Mañana" by Leiva	Manuel Díaz	OUT
Final Round			Identity	Result
1	Fly	"Livin' on a Prayer" by Bon Jovi	Abraham Mateo	WINNER
2	Cobra	"Dance the Night" by Dua Lipa	Adriana Ugarte	RUNNER-UP

== Ratings ==
Mask Singer: Adivina quién canta consolidated viewership and adjusted position Colour key (nominal): – Highest rating during the season – Lowest rating during the season
Episode	Original airdate	Timeslot	Viewers (millions)	Share	Night rank	Source
1	16 October 2024	Wednesday 11:15 pm	1.05	14.7%	#1	
2	23 October 2024	Wednesday 11:15 pm	1.03	14.5%	#1	
3	6 November 2024	Wednesday 11:15 pm	0.87	11.9%	#2	
4	13 November 2024	Wednesday 11:15 pm	0.90	12.5%	#2	
5	20 November 2024	Wednesday 11:15 pm	0.98	14.5%	#1	
6	27 November 2024	Wednesday 11:15 pm	0.89	12.6%	#2	
7	4 December 2024	Wednesday 11:15 pm	0.95	13.2%	#1	
8	11 December 2024	Wednesday 11:15 pm	1.12	16.2%	#1	

== Incidents ==
During the season's tapings in October 2023, the cast and crew had to evacuate the studio when it became flooded due to heavy rain.

During the season premiere, Palomitas (revealed as Ana Obregón later in the episode) could not do the usual walk on the stage before performing due to sciatica. For the same reason, she remained sitting during her performance and the segment afterwards.
