= Mask Singer: Adivina quién canta season 5 =

Mask Singer: Adivina quién canta
- Season 5
- Hosted by: Arturo Valls
- Judges: Boris Izaguirre; Ruth Lorenzo; Juan y Medio; Ana Milán
- No. of contestants: 18
- Winner: Leire Martínez as "Clavel"
- Runner-up: Nacho Duato as "Momia"
- Location: Madrid
- No. of episodes: 8

Release
- Original network: Antena 3
- Original release: 8 April – 27 May 2026

Season chronology
- ← Previous; Season 4

The fifth season of Spanish reality show singer competition Mask Singer: Adivina quién canta premiered on 8 April 2026.

== Panelists and host ==
Arturo Valls continues as host for the fifth season, while the panel, for the first time, will not feature Javier Calvo or Javier Ambrossi; in their and Alaska's place, singer Ruth Lorenzo, writer and television personality Boris Izaguirre and television presenter Juan y Medio join Ana Milán at the investigators' table.

== Contestants ==
The first eight masks of the season were announced on 31 March 2026.

Stage name	Celebrity	Occupation	Episodes							
Stage name	Celebrity	Occupation	1	2	3	4	5	6	7	8
Clavel (Carnation)	Leire Martínez	Singer		SAFE		SAFE		SAFE	SAFE	WINNER
Momia (Mummy)	Nacho Duato	Ballet Dancer	SAFE		SAFE		SAFE		SAFE	RUNNER-UP
Troglodita (Troglodyte) (WC)	Vicky Martín Berrocal	TV Presenter/Actress			SAFE		SAFE		SAFE	THIRD
Jirafa (Giraffe)	David Cantero	Broadcaster		SAFE		SAFE		SAFE	SAFE	FOURTH
Mejillón (Mussels) (WC)	Silvia Abril	Actress/Comedian				SAFE		SAFE	OUT	
Mofeta (Skunk) (WC)	Lola Lolita	Influencer			SAFE		SAFE		OUT	
Tortuga (Tortoise) (WC)	Rappel	Clairvoyant				SAFE		OUT		
Pizza	Lydia Lozano	Journalist/TV Presenter		SAFE		SAFE		OUT		
Loro (Parrot)	María del Monte	Singer	SAFE		SAFE		OUT			
Chihuahua	Begoña Villacís	Lawyer/Former politician	SAFE		SAFE		OUT			
Planta Carnívora (Carnivorous Plant) (WC)	Cayetana Guillén Cuervo	Actress/TV Presenter				OUT				
Bocata Calamares (Squid Sandwich)	Tomás Roncero	Sports Journalist		SAFE		OUT				
Chanclas (Flip-flops) (WC)	Trancas y Barrancas	Puppets			OUT					
Labios (Lips)	Samantha Fox	Singer	SAFE		OUT					
Caracol (Snail)	Salva Reina	Actor		OUT						
Fregona (Mop)	Martina Navrátilová	Tennis player		OUT						
Semáforo (Traffic Light)	Bernd Schuster	Footballer	OUT							
Micrófono (Microphone)	Elle Macpherson	Model/TV Host	OUT							

== Episodes ==
=== Week 1 (April 8) ===
Performances on the first episode
#	Stage name	Song	Identity	Result
1	Parrot	"Samba do Brasil" by Bellini	undisclosed	SAFE
2	Microphone	"I Gotta Feeling" by Black Eyed Peas	Elle Macpherson	OUT
3	Mummy	"Todo Contigo" by Álvaro de Luna	undisclosed	SAFE
4	Lips	"Espresso" by Sabrina Carpenter	undisclosed	SAFE
5	Traffic Light	"Don't Stop Me Now" by Queen	Bernd Schuster	OUT
6	Chihuahua	"Bring Me to Life" by Evanescence	undisclosed	SAFE

=== Week 2 (April 15) ===
Performances on the second episode
#	Stage name	Song	Identity	Result
1	Carnation	"APT." by Rosé and Bruno Mars	undisclosed	SAFE
2	Mop	"So What" by P!nk	Martina Navrátilová	OUT
3	Squid Sandwich	"El último día de nuestras vidas" by Dani Martín	undisclosed	SAFE
4	Giraffe	"Quiero tener tu presencia" by Seguridad Social	undisclosed	SAFE
5	Pizza	"Sweet Caroline" by Neil Diamond	undisclosed	SAFE
6	Snail	"Sex Bomb" by Tom Jones and Mousse T.	Salva Reina	OUT

=== Week 3 (April 22) ===
Performances on the third episode
#	Stage name	Song	Identity	Result
1	Mummy	"Footloose" by Kenny Loggins	undisclosed	SAFE
2	Parrot	"Gloria" by Umberto Tozzi	undisclosed	SAFE
3	Lips	"Titanium" by David Guetta & Sia	Samantha Fox	OUT
4	Chihuahua	"Can't Get You Out of My Head" by Kylie Minogue	undisclosed	SAFE
5	Flip-flops	"La Chica Del Bikini Azul" by Luis Miguel	Trancas y Barrancas	OUT
6	Troglodyte	"La Reina" by Lola Índigo	undisclosed	SAFE
7	Skunk	"Si Antes Te Hubiera Conocido" by Karol G	undisclosed	SAFE

=== Week 4 (April 29) ===
Performances on the fourth episode
#	Stage name	Song	Identity	Result
1	Pizza	"Voyage, voyage" by Kate Ryan	undisclosed	SAFE
2	Carnation	"Wrecking Ball" by Miley Cyrus	undisclosed	SAFE
3	Squid Sandwich	"Princesas" by Pereza	Tomás Roncero	OUT
4	Giraffe	"No puedo vivir sin ti" by Los Ronaldos	undisclosed	SAFE
5	Carnivorous Plant	"Madrid City" by Ana Mena	Cayetana Guillén Cuervo	OUT
6	Tortoise	"Fiesta pagana" by Mägo de Oz	undisclosed	SAFE
7	Mussels	"Just Dance" by Lady Gaga	undisclosed	SAFE

=== Week 5 (May 6) ===
- Susi Caramelo appeared as a guest investigator.

Performances on the fifth episode
#	Stage name	Song	Identity	Result
1	Skunk	"Los Ángeles" by Aitana	undisclosed	SAFE
2	Troglodyte	"Ni una Sola Palabra" by Paulina Rubio	undisclosed	SAFE
3	Chihuahua	"Please Don't Go" by KC and the Sunshine Band	Begoña Villacís	OUT
4	Mummy	"Rock DJ" by Robbie Williams	undisclosed	SAFE
5	Parrot	"Me has invitado a bailar" by Dani Fernández	María del Monte	OUT

=== Week 6 (May 13) ===
- Roberto Brasero appeared as a guest investigator.

Performances on the sixth episode
#	Stage name	Song	Identity	Result
1	Pizza	"Pedro" by Raffaella Carrà	Lydia Lozano	OUT
2	Carnation	"Girl on Fire" by Alicia Keys	undisclosed	SAFE
3	Giraffe	"La casa por el tejado" by Fito & Fitipaldis	undisclosed	SAFE
4	Mussels	"Tequiero" by Vicco & Abraham Mateo	undisclosed	SAFE
5	Tortoise	"Voy a pasármelo bien" by Hombres G	Rappel	OUT

=== Week 7 (May 20) ===
- Pablo López, Abraham Mateo, Nena Daconte, Melody, Carlos Baute and Rafa Sánchez appeared as guests to perform with the masks.

Performances on the seventh episode
#	Stage name	Song	Duet Partner	Identity	Result
1	Giraffe	"Tu enemigo" by Pablo López and Juanes	Pablo López	undisclosed	SAFE
2	Carnation	"Quiero decirte" by Abraham Mateo and Ana Mena	Abraham Mateo	undisclosed	SAFE
3	Skunk	"En qué estrella estará" by Nena Daconte	Nena Daconte	Lola Lolita	OUT
4	Mussels	"Esa diva" by Melody	Melody	Silvia Abril	OUT
5	Troglodyte	"Colgando en tus manos" by Carlos Baute and Marta Sánchez	Carlos Baute	undisclosed	SAFE
6	Mummy	"Lobo-hombre en París" by La Unión	Rafa Sánchez	undisclosed	SAFE

=== Week 8 (May 27) - Finale ===
Performances on the eight episode
#	Stage name	Song	Result	
1	Troglodyte	"Whatever" by Kygo and Ava Max	undisclosed	SAFE
2	Giraffe	"La Falda" by Myke Towers	David Cantero	OUT
3	Carnation	"I Have Nothing" by Whitney Houston	undisclosed	SAFE
4	Mummy	"Chiquilla" by Seguridad Social	undisclosed	SAFE
First Round			Identity	Result
1	Troglodyte	"Womanizer" by Britney Spears	Vicky Martín Berrocal	OUT
2	Mummy	"Summer of '69" by Bryan Adams	undisclosed	SAFE
3	Carnation	"Respect" by Aretha Franklin	undisclosed	SAFE
Final Round			Identity	Result
1	Carnation	"What a Feeling" by Irene Cara	Leire Martínez	WINNER
2	Mummy	"Columbia" by Quevedo	Nacho Duato	RUNNER-UP

== Ratings ==
Mask Singer: Adivina quién canta consolidated viewership and adjusted position Colour key (nominal): – Highest rating during the season – Lowest rating during the season
Episode	Original airdate	Timeslot	Viewers (millions)	Share	Night rank	Source
1	8 April 2026	Wednesday 11:15 pm	0.98	14.2%	#1	
2	15 April 2026	Wednesday 11:15 pm	0.83	12.3%	#1	
3	22 April 2026	Wednesday 11:15 pm	0.76	12%	#2	
4	29 April 2026	Wednesday 11:15 pm	0.83	12.8%	#2	
5	6 May 2026	Wednesday 11:15 pm	0.83	12.7%	#1	
6	13 May 2026	Wednesday 11:15 pm	0.90	12.4%	#2	
7	20 May 2026	Wednesday 11:15 pm	0.94	14.1%	#1	
8	27 May 2026	Wednesday 11:15 pm	0.94	15.8%	#1	
