= Veo cómo cantas (Spanish game show) season 1 =

Television game show season

Veo cómo cantas
- Season 1
- Starring: El Monaguillo; Josie Gallego; Ruth Lorenzo; Ana Milán
- Hosted by: Manel Fuentes
- Winners: Good singers: 5; Bad singers: 1
- No. of episodes: 6

Release
- Original network: Antena 3
- Original release: 8 September – 13 October 2021

Season chronology
- Next → Season 2

The first season of the Spanish television mystery music game show Veo cómo cantas premiered on Antena 3 on 8 September 2021.

== Gameplay ==
=== Format ===
According to the original South Korean rules, the guest artist and contestant must attempt to eliminate bad singers during its game phase. At the final performance, the last remaining mystery singer is revealed as either good or bad by means of a duet between them and one of the guest artists.

The contestant must eliminate one mystery singer at the end of each round, receiving €3,000 if they eliminate a bad singer. At the end of a game, if the contestant decides to walk away, they will keep the money had won in previous rounds; if they decide to risk for the last remaining mystery singer, they double their all winnings if a singer is good, or give it anyway to the winning bad singer selected by them.

=== Rounds ===
1. By the face (Spanish: Por la cara)
  The guest artist and contestant are given some time to observe and examine each mystery singer based on their appearance.
2. Lip sync (Spanish: Sincronización labial)
  Each mystery singer performs a lip sync to a song; good singers mime to a recording of their own, while bad singers mime to a backing track by another vocalist.
3. Gossip my life (Spanish: Cotillea mi vida)
  The guest artist and contestant are presented with a video package containing possible clues by one of the mystery singers.
4. Musical skill (Spanish: Habilidad musical)
  The guest artist and contestant must describe one of the mystery singer's other talents, except "singing" itself. This may not be related to the "stage of truth", but depends on their identity.
5. Rehearsal (Spanish: Ensayo)
  The guest artist and contestant are presented with video from a recording session by one of the mystery singers if their choice, but pitch-shifted to obscure their actual vocals.
6. Interrogation (Spanish: Interrogatorio)
  The guest artist and contestant may ask questions to the remaining mystery singers. Good singers are required to give truthful responses, while the bad singers must lie.

== Episodes ==
=== Guest artists ===
Legend:
Good singer
Bad singer
— The contestants won the money.
— The winning bad singer stole the money.

Episode		Guest artist (Note: Players' notes: For the returning guest artists (who also include foreigners and former good singers), names are displayed in italics.; For the mixed groups, names who identified as bad singers are displayed in italics.)	Contestant	Mystery singers (In their respective numbers and aliases)								
#	Date	Guest artist	Contestant	Elimination order								Winner
#	Date	Guest artist	Contestant	By the face	Lip sync		Gossip my life		Musical skill	Rehearsal	Interrogation	Winner
1	8 September 2021	Rosario Flores	Natalia Izquierdo → €30,000	1. Laura Jabalón; (Karateka)	3. Yaiza García Motos; (Flamenco Dancer)	8. Viridiana Vasileva; (Handballer)	6. Raquel Ruiz; (Hiker)	2. Leo Rizzi; (Sculptor)	4. Fernando Maure; (Clerk)	9. Antonio López; (Salsa Champion)	6. Ulises Úbeda; (Wrestling Announcer)	7. Daniel Peña; Fisherman
2	15 September 2021	Antonio Orozco	Sara Rozas → €24,000	8. David Páramo; (Computer Scientist)	3. Nerea Plasencia; (Punk)	5. Juan Vargas; (Travel Agent)	6. Sara Ester Rivilla; (Pin-up Model)	4. Manu Pilas; (Lumberjack)	1. Helena Monzó; (Croupier)	7. Andrea Bayardo; (Translator)	9. Paula Soto; (Cat Lover)	2. Carlos Ángel Valdés; Otaku
3	22 September 2021	Marta Sánchez	Xabier Peso → €0	1. Elisabet Molet; (Educational Psychologist)	4. Marta Fiallo; (Acrobat)	7. Azucena Gonzaléz; (Biker)	6. Joseán Moreno; (Barber)	5. Sara Jiménez; (Dietician)	3. Ángel Padilla; (Fencer)	2. Pablo Navarro; (Violinist)	9. Naiomi Weilier; (Make-up Artist)	8. Adela Gómez Ferrero; Baker
4	29 September 2021	Pastora Soler	Daniel Ferrer → €24,000	7. Tiago Barbosa; (Model)	3. Pitu Manubens; (Diver)	8. Denissa Bravo; (Nurse)	1. Eva de Dominici; (Pregnant)	5. Jero Montajes; (Electrician)	6. Sally Wood; (Foodie)	4. Lucía Bentabol; (Painter)	2. Adrián Felipez; (Chef)	9. Almudena Hernandez; Gym Instructor
5	6 October 2021	José Mercé	Margue Catalano → €30,000	3. Juanjo Maetzu; (Journalist)	9. Sigri Fernández; (Image Consultant)	7. Sara Marcos; (Padel Player)	4. Dulcinea Juárez; (Renaissance Artist)	5. Daniel Rosado; (Baseball Player)	8. Mara Paz; (Pole Dancer)	6. Zoe Buccolini; (Vegetarian)	2. Juanky Muñoz^{(Boxer)}	1. Elia Wolf; Event Producer
6	13 October 2021	David Bustamante	Ramiro Muñoz → €30,000	4. Eder Ceballos; (Stylist)	2. Gabriel Numancia; (Gamer)	7. Kevin Aguilar; (Runner)	6. Nerea Alonso González; (Veterinarian)	3. Mer Díaz; (Teacher)	1. Vanessa Frías; (Make-up Artist)	8. Mara Escobar; (News Reporter)	9. Sam Gómez; (Swimmer)	5. Sergi Albert; Tour Guide

=== Panelists ===
Legend:
Regular panelist
Guest panelist

Apps		Panelists in attendance (Sorted by first appearance, with episode designations)
g#	p#	Panelists in attendance (Sorted by first appearance, with episode designations)
6	3	El Monaguillo, Josie Gallego, and Ruth Lorenzo (1–6)
5	1	Ana Milán (1, 3–6)
1	1	Lolita Flores (3)

== Reception ==
Legend:
Highest rated episode
Lowest rated episode

No.	Title	Air date	Timeslot (CET)	Consolidated			Ref(s)
No.	Title	Air date	Timeslot (CET)	Rank	Share	Total	Ref(s)
1	"Rosario Flores"	8 September 2021	Wednesday, 23:00	6	16.9%	1.733	
2	"Antonio Orozco"	15 September 2021	Wednesday, 23:00	9	14.9%	1.543	
3	"Marta Sánchez"	22 September 2021	Wednesday, 23:00	22	10%	1.097	
4	"Pastora Soler"	29 September 2021	Wednesday, 23:00	23	10.7%	1.136	
5	"José Mercé"	6 October 2021	Wednesday, 23:00	21	9.8%	1.047	
6	"David Bustamante"	13 October 2021	Wednesday, 23:00	22	10.7%	1.152	

Source: Kantar Media España
