= Mask Singer: Adivina quién canta season 3 =

Mask Singer: Adivina quién canta
- Season 3
- Hosted by: Arturo Valls
- Judges: Javier Ambrossi; Javier Calvo; Mónica Naranjo; Ana Obregón
- No. of contestants: 16
- Winners: Ana Torroja as "Ratita" & Fernando Morientes as "Gorila"
- Location: Madrid
- No. of episodes: 8

Release
- Original network: Antena 3
- Original release: 10 May – 5 July 2023

Season chronology
- ← Previous; Season 2 Next → Season 4

The third season of Spanish reality show singer competition Mask Singer: Adivina quién canta premiered on May 10, 2023.

== Panelists and host ==
Arturo Valls returned as host for the third season, as did panelists Javier Calvo and Javier Ambrossi. The other two panelists, José Mota and Paz Vega, did not continue on the show, being replaced by singer Mónica Naranjo and actress Ana Obregón. TV host Roberto Leal and actress Anabel Alonso featured as guest panelists in episode 5 and 6 respectively.

== Contestants ==
A total of twelve masks were announced for this season, with "Alienígenas" becoming the first duo to take part in the Spanish version. Four more masks that were not announced ahead of time joined the show after the first eliminations.

Stage name	Celebrity	Occupation	Episodes							
Stage name	Celebrity	Occupation	1	2	3	4	5	6	7	8
Ratita (Little Mouse) (WC)	Ana Torroja	Singer			SAFE		WIN		SAFE	WINNERS (Note: Little Mouse and Gorilla were named joint winners after tying in the final vote.)
Gorila (Gorilla)	Fernando Morientes	Ex-footballer		SAFE		SAFE		WIN	SAFE	WINNERS
Caballito de Mar (Seahorse)	Sabrina Salerno	Singer	SAFE		SAFE		RISK		SAFE	THIRD
Gallo (Rooster) (WC)	Paco Tous	Actor			SAFE		RISK		SAFE	FOURTH
Hada (Fairy) (WC)	Alaska	Singer				SAFE		RISK	OUT	
Bebé (Baby) (WC)	Dulceida	Influencer				SAFE		RISK	OUT	
Cupcake	Ana Milán	Actress		SAFE		SAFE		OUT (Note: All panelists used El Delatador and correctly guessed the celebrity's identity, causing the latter to be unmasked immediately)		
Alienígenas (Aliens)	Miguel Torres	Ex-footballer	SAFE		SAFE		OUT			
Alienígenas (Aliens)	Paula Echevarría	Actress/model	SAFE		SAFE		OUT			
Banderilla	Naty Abascal	Socialite		SAFE		OUT				
Sirena (Mermaid)	Bo Derek	Actress/model		SAFE		OUT				
Esqueleto (Skeleton)	Feliciano López	Former tennis player	SAFE		OUT					
Tigre (Tiger)	El Rubius	YouTuber	SAFE		OUT					
Gnomo (Gnome)	José Ramón de la Morena	Sports journalist		OUT						
Matrioska (Matryoshka)	Valeria Mazza	Model		OUT						
Arlequín (Harlequin)	Tori Spelling	Actress	OUT							
Faraona (Pharaoh)	Arantxa Sánchez Vicario	Tennis legend	OUT							

== Episodes ==
=== Week 1 (May 10) ===
Performances on the first episode
#	Stage name	Song	Identity	Result
1	Seahorse	"I Kissed A Girl" by Katy Perry	undisclosed	SAFE
2	Aliens	"Cold Heart" by Dua Lipa & Elton John	undisclosed	SAFE
3	Pharaoh	"La Niña De La Escuela" by Lola Índigo, Belinda & Tini	Arantxa Sánchez Vicario	OUT
4	Tiger	"Beggin'" by Måneskin	undisclosed	SAFE
5	Skeleton	"Bienvenidos" by Miguel Ríos	undisclosed	SAFE
6	Harlequin	"Title" by Meghan Trainor	Tori Spelling	OUT

=== Week 2 (May 17) ===
Performances on the second episode
#	Stage name	Song	Identity	Result
1	Cupcake	"Nada que perder" by Pignoise	undisclosed	SAFE
2	Mermaid	"Shake It Off" by Taylor Swift	undisclosed	SAFE
3	Matryoshka	"Bad Habits" by Ed Sheeran	Valeria Mazza	OUT
4	Gnome	"Clavado en un Bar" by Maná	José Ramón de la Morena	OUT
5	Gorilla	"Tacones Rojos" by Sebastián Yatra	undisclosed	SAFE
6	Banderilla	"A far l'amore comincia tu" by Raffaella Carrà	undisclosed	SAFE

=== Week 3 (May 24) ===
Performances on the third episode
#	Stage name	Song	Identity	Result
1	Little Mouse	"Strong Enough" by Cher	undisclosed	SAFE
2	Tiger	"Todo de Ti" by Rauw Alejandro	El Rubius	OUT
3	Aliens	"Nunca debí enamorarme" by Camela	undisclosed	SAFE
4	Seahorse	"Don't Start Now" by Dua Lipa	undisclosed	SAFE
5	Skeleton	"Loco" by Justin Quiles	Feliciano López	OUT
6	Rooster	"Da Ya Think I'm Sexy?" by Rod Stewart	undisclosed	SAFE

=== Week 4 (May 31) ===
Performances on the fourth episode
#	Stage name	Song	Identity	Result
1	Baby	"Forever Young" by Alphaville	undisclosed	SAFE
2	Gorilla	"Friday" by Riton & Nightcrawlers	undisclosed	SAFE
3	Mermaid	"La Dolce Vita" by Soraya	Bo Derek	OUT
4	Cupcake	"Amante Bandido" by Miguel Bosé	undisclosed	SAFE
5	Banderilla	"Kesi" by Camilo	Naty Abascal	OUT
6	Fairy	"Don't Go Yet" by Camila Cabello	undisclosed	SAFE

=== Week 5 (June 7) ===
- Roberto Leal appeared as a guest investigator.

Performances on the fifth episode
#	Stage name	Song	Result	
1	Little Mouse	"Think" by Aretha Franklin	WIN	
2	Aliens	"Mon Amour (Remix)" by Zzoilo & Aitana	RISK	
3	Rooster	"Venezia" by Hombres G	RISK	
4	Seahorse	"It's My Life" by No Doubt	RISK	
Final round			Identity	Result
1	Aliens	"La Tortura" by Shakira & Alejandro Sanz	Miguel Torres & Paula Echevarría	OUT
2	Seahorse	"Save Your Tears" by The Weeknd	undisclosed	SAFE
3	Rooster	"La del pirata cojo" by Joaquín Sabina	undisclosed	SAFE

=== Week 6 (June 14) ===
- Anabel Alonso appeared as a guest investigator.

Performances on the sixth episode
#	Stage name	Song	Result	
1	Cupcake	"Barbie Girl" by Aqua	RISK	
2	Gorilla	"Rey del Glam" by Loquillo	WIN	
3	Fairy	"Starships" by Nicki Minaj	RISK	
4	Baby	"Roar" by Katy Perry	RISK	
Final round			Identity	Result
1	Cupcake	"Ram Pam Pam" by Becky G & Natti Natasha	Ana Milán	DELETE
2	Fairy	"Chandelier" by Sia	undisclosed	SAFE
3	Baby	"Mr. Saxobeat" by Alexandra Stan	undisclosed	SAFE

=== Week 7 (June 21) ===
Performances on the seventh episode
#	Stage name	Song	Identity	Result
1	Seahorse	"One Way or Another" by Blondie	undisclosed	SAFE
2	Baby	"...Baby One More Time" by Britney Spears	Dulceida	OUT
3	Rooster	"Como Camarón" by Estopa	undisclosed	SAFE
4	Little Mouse	"Total Eclipse of the Heart" by Bonnie Tyler	undisclosed	SAFE
5	Gorilla	"Pareja del Año" by Sebastián Yatra & Myke Towers	undisclosed	SAFE
6	Fairy	"Good 4 U" by Olivia Rodrigo	Alaska	OUT

=== Week 8 (July 5) - Finale ===
Performances on the ninth episode
#	Stage name	Song	Result	
1	Little Mouse	"Easy On Me" by Adele	undisclosed	SAFE
2	Seahorse	"Maniac" by Michael Sembello	undisclosed	SAFE
3	Gorilla	"Besos en Guerra" by Juanes and Morat	undisclosed	SAFE
4	Rooster	"Historias de Amor" by OBK	Paco Tous	OUT
First Round			Identity	Result
1	Gorilla	"It's My Life" by Bon Jovi	undisclosed	SAFE
2	Seahorse	"Hung Up" by Madonna	Sabrina Salerno	OUT
3	Little Mouse	"Levitating" by Dua Lipa	undisclosed	SAFE
Final Round			Identity	Result
1	Little Mouse	"Shallow" by Lady Gaga & Bradley Cooper	Ana Torroja	WINNERS
2	Gorilla	"Pepas" by Farruko	Fernando Morientes	WINNERS

== Ratings ==
Mask Singer: Adivina quién canta consolidated viewership and adjusted position Colour key (nominal): – Highest rating during the season – Lowest rating during the season
Episode	Original airdate	Timeslot	Viewers (millions)	Share	Night rank	Source
1	10 May 2023	Wednesday 10:45 pm	1.78	18.2%	#1	
2	17 May 2023	Wednesday 10:45 pm	1.71	18.0%	#1	
3	24 May 2023	Wednesday 10:45 pm	1.70	18.0%	#1	
4	31 May 2023	Wednesday 10:45 pm	1.44	14.9%	#1	
5	7 June 2023	Wednesday 10:45 pm	1.47	15.6%	#1	
6	14 June 2023	Wednesday 10:45 pm	1.43	15.2%	#1	
7	21 June 2023	Wednesday 10:45 pm	1.44	16.9%	#1	
8	5 July 2023	Wednesday 10:45 pm	1.59	20.0%	#1	
