= Antonio Lobato =

Spanish journalist and TV host

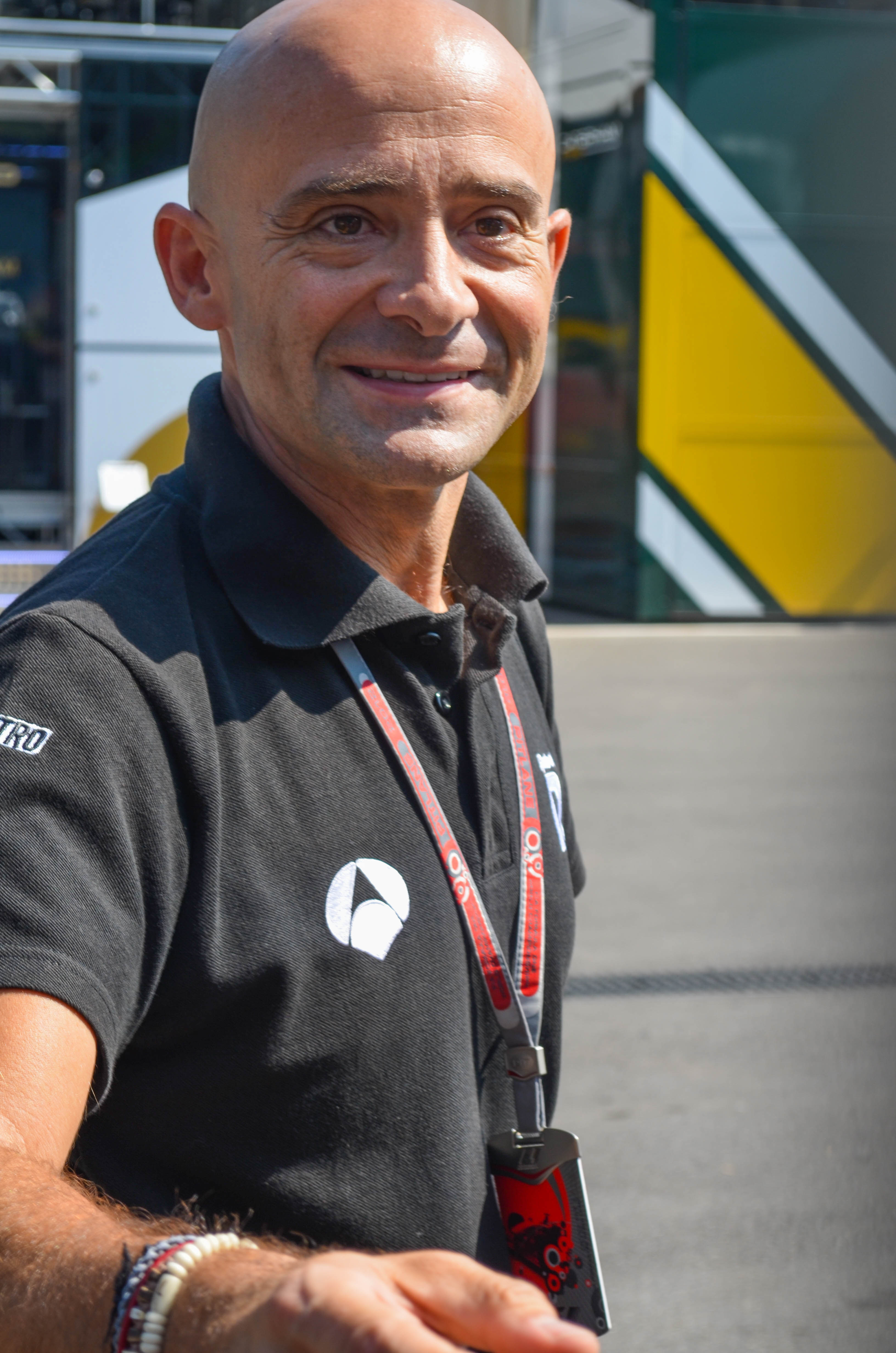
- Born: Antonio Lobato Porras; 7 September 1965 (age 61); Oviedo, Asturias, Spain
- Other name: The bald of the Formula One (Spain)
- Occupations: Journalist and television presenter
- Years active: 1987-present
- Employers: ABC; Radio España; Onda Cero; (1991-1994); Telecinco; (1994-2008); LaSexta; (2009-2011); Antena 3; (2012-2015); Televisión Española; (2016-2018); Movistar Plus+; (2018-present); DAZN; (2021-present)

Antonio Lobato Porras (Oviedo, Asturias, Spain; September 7, 1965) is a Spanish sports journalist and television presenter. He is especially known for his television broadcasts of Formula 1 in Spain on various channels.

== Biography ==
Born in Oviedo, he graduated in information sciences in Madrid. He began his professional career in the sports section of the ABC newspaper in 1987. He then continued in radio, working as a sports reporter, covering sporting events such as the Olympic Games of Barcelona 92 or several editions of the Vuelta ciclista a España. He first worked for Radio España and then for Onda Cero. Parallel to his work at the latter station, he debuted on television in 1991 as a contributor to the sports program Campeones on Telecinco.

== Programs ==
After three years at Onda Cero, in October 1994, he left the radio to join the sports newsroom of Informativos Telecinco. In January 1997, he went on to present sports news in the midday edition of Informativos Telecinco, and in 1999, he was appointed deputy sports director of the channel.

In 2001, he became the host of "La Tertulia Deportiva," a sports debate program broadcast daily after the evening news.

In 2004, Telecinco acquired the rights to broadcast Formula 1 in Spain and Lobato, who had already broadcast the Giro d'Italia in 1995 for the private channel, was chosen to cover the races. This would bring great popularity to the journalist, as he was able to narrate the first two world titles of a Spanish driver, Fernando Alonso, for the first time in Formula 1, in 2005 and 2006. Alonso's emergence skyrocketed the television audiences of Telecinco's broadcasts, which have been among the most watched programs of the year in Spain ever since.

El calvo de Telecinco, El calvo de La Sexta, and finally El calvo de la Fórmula 1 were popular names for him He became one of the most charismatic faces of the private channel. As evidence, in 2006, he was chosen to co-host the New Year's Eve "Campanadas" broadcast with Carmen Alcayde. In 2006, he also lent his voice to the dubbing of the character Bob Cutlass in the movie Cars in Spain and to the PlayStation 2 video game Formula One 2006, acting as race commentator. He has also been a member of the jury for the Prince of Asturias Sports Awards since 2002.

In September 2007, Telecinco restructured its sports news area and he was appointed deputy news director for events and sports broadcasts of the network, in addition to continuing to direct and narrate Formula 1.

From the 2009 Formula 1 season until the 2011 season, he broadcast the races on La Sexta, the channel that acquired the broadcasting rights for the following five years and the services of the journalist. However, La Sexta lost the television rights due to non payment, and they were subsequently acquired by Antena 3.

In November 2010, he was awarded the Ondas Award (along with the La Sexta team) for his free-to-air coverage of Formula 1.

On February 16, 2012, it was announced that Antonio Lobato would broadcast the 2012 Formula 1 season with his team on Antena 3.

On February 21, 2014, Antonio Lobato himself confirmed on his Twitter account that he would continue for one more season in charge of Formula 1 broadcasts on Antena 3.

On November 29, 2015, he provided commentary for a Formula 1 race on Antena 3 on television for the last time before taking a 2-year break away from television racing.

In 2016, he presented the program "Desafía tu mente" on TVE's La 1.

From the 2018 Formula 1 season, the journalist returns to narrate the Grand Prix on Movistar Formula 1.

From the 2021 Formula 1 season, DAZN gets the rights to Formula 1. Movistar Formula 1 is renamed DAZN F1 and it is there where it continues to narrate the GPs. He combines his work with the presentation of the program Vamos sobre ruedas (Let's go on wheels) on the #Vamos channel.

In 2024, he participated in the Antena 3 television show Mask Singer: Adivina quién canta, under the mask of Churros.

In 2025, an advertisement by compramostucoche.es featuring him became a meme in Spain.
