= Mask Singer: Adivina quién canta =

Spanish reality singing competition series

- Genre: Reality competition
- Based on: King of Mask Singer by Munhwa Broadcasting Corporation
- Presented by: Arturo Valls
- Starring: Javier Ambrossi; Javier Calvo; Malú; José Mota; Paz Vega; Mónica Naranjo; Ana Obregón; Alaska; Ana Milán; Juan y Medio; Ruth Lorenzo; Boris Izaguirre
- Country of origin: Spain
- Original language: Spanish
- No. of seasons: 5
- No. of episodes: 41

Production
- Executive producers: Francesco Boserman; Mario Briongos
- Production companies: Fremantle; Atresmedia

Original release
- Network: Antena 3
- Release: 4 November 2020 – present

Mask Singer: Adivina quién canta (lit. 'Mask Singer: Guess Who Sings') is a Spanish reality singing competition show produced by Fremantle for Antena 3. It is the Spanish adaptation of the Masked Singer franchise.

== Format ==
The show follows a similar format to that of the British version. A total of 12 celebrities compete, split into two groups of 6 for the first episodes, with everyone competing at once starting from the fifth episode. The contestants are paired up in one-on-one duels, with the loser of each duel being up for elimination. The least voted contestant is unmasked and eliminated from the competition.

Some episodes include guest masked performers who reveal themselves after their performance.

== Panelists and host ==
Arturo Valls serves as the show's host, and is joined by a permanent panel of 'investigators' composed of actors Javier Calvo and Javier Ambrossi and comedian José Mota. Some episodes also feature guest panelists. Opera singer Ainhoa Arteta was initially slated to be in the panel, but pulled out due to delays in production caused by the coronavirus pandemic and was replaced by Malú. Also, Vanesa Martín stood in for Malú when she missed a taping due to injury and Eva González appeared as a guest investigator.

Season one winner, Paz Vega, replaced singer Malú as investigator in season two, after she opted out in order to coach on La Voz. On 13 January 2022, it was confirmed Ambrossi and Calvo would return for their third series as investigators, joined by Mónica Naranjo and Ana Obregón. In July 2023, it was confirmed that season four would see Ambrossi and Calvo as panelists once again, whereas Naranjo and Obregón would be replaced by season three participants; Alaska and Ana Milán. In May 2025 it was confirmed that Ana Milán would continue in the fifth season, and that Juan y Medio, Ruth Lorenzo and Boris Izaguirre would join as panelists.

Cast Member	Seasons				
Cast Member	1	2	3	4	5
Host
Arturo Valls	Main	Main	Main	Main	Main
Panelists
Javier Ambrossi	Main	Main	Main	Main	
Javier Calvo	Main	Main	Main	Main	
Malú	Main				
José Mota	Main	Main			
Paz Vega	Mask	Main			
Ana Obregón		Guest	Main	Mask	
Mónica Naranjo			Main		
Ana Milán			Mask	Main	Main
Alaska			Mask	Main	
Juan y Medio					Main
Ruth Lorenzo					Main
Boris Izaguirre					Main
Vanesa Martín	Guest				
Eva González	Guest				
Chenoa		Guest			
Nuria Roca		Guest			
Roberto Leal			Guest		
Anabel Alonso			Guest		
Pilar Rubio				Guest	
Paco León				Guest	
Susi Caramelo					Guest
Roberto Brasero					Guest

== Series overview ==
Series overview
Series	Celebrities	Episodes	Originally released		Winner	Runner-up	Third place
Series	Celebrities	Episodes	First released	Last released	Winner	Runner-up	Third place
1	12	8	4 November 2020	23 December 2020	Paz Vega as "Catrina"	Genoveva Casanova as "Caniche"	Toni Cantó as "Camaleón"
2	15	9	24 May 2021	29 July 2021	Joaquín Cortés as "Erizo"	Willy Bárcenas as "Plátano"	María Pombo as "Huevo"
3	16	8	10 May 2023	5 July 2023	Ana Torroja & Fernando Morientes as "Ratita" & "Gorila"	-	Sabrina Salerno as "Caballito de Mar"
4	16	8	16 October 2024	11 December 2024	Abraham Mateo as "Mosca"	Adriana Ugarte as "Cobra"	Manuel Díaz "El Cordobés" as "Tiburón"
5	18	8	8 April 2026	27 May 2026	Leire Martínez as "Clavel"	Nacho Duato as "Momia"	Vicky Martín Berrocal as "Troglodita"
