= Amistades Peligrosas =

Amistades Peligrosas may refer to:

- Amistades Peligrosas (band), a Spanish music duo
- Amistades peligrosas (TV series), a Spanish television series
