= Mar Flores =

Spanish top model and TV personality

- Born: María del Mar Flores Caballero; June 11, 1969 (age 56); Madrid, Spain
- Occupations: Model; TV panelist
- Years active: 1989–present
- Height: 1.82 m
- Spouse(s): Carlo Costanzia di Costigliole (1992–1996); Javier Merino (2001–2016)
- Partner(s): Bertín Osborne (1990); Fernando Fernández Tapias (1996–1997); Alessandro Lequio (1997); Cayetano Martínez de Irujo (1998–1999)
- Children: Carlo Costanzia Flores; Mauro Merino Flores; Beltrán Merino Flores; Bruno Merino Flores; Darío Merino Flores

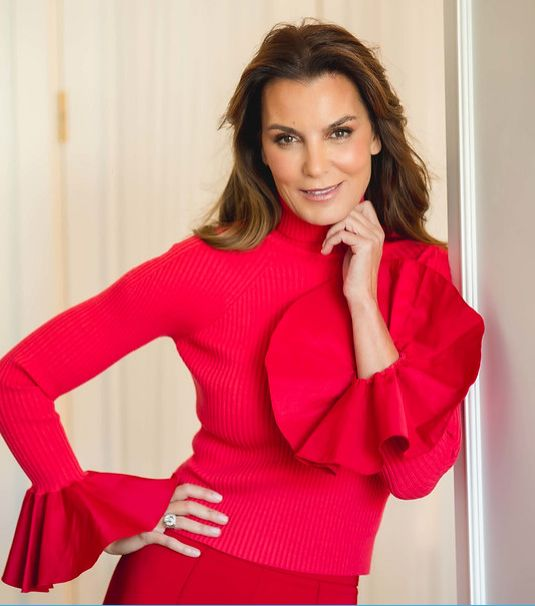

María del Mar Flores Caballero, better known as Mar Flores (born June 11, 1969), is a Spanish model, entrepreneur and actress.

== Biography ==
Born in the Madrid district of Usera, she entered the fashion world in 1989 after winning the Rostro de los 90 award, organized by the magazine Elle. She quickly gained popularity due to the media interest in her personal life.

Her sister, Marián Flores, was a hostess on the television program Un, dos, tres... responda otra vez, during the era of Victoria Abril and María Durán.

As a model, she walked the runways in Milan for designers like Giorgio Armani and Gai Mattiolo, as well as at Cibeles and Gaudí fashion shows. She appeared in advertising campaigns for brands such as Caramelo, Cacharel, La Perla), Montblanc, Multiópticas, Solmayor and the Christmas commercial for Freixenet. She has graced the covers of worldwide known magazines such as Elle, Marie Claire, Dunia, and Man, among others.

In 1991, she made her television debut as a presenter on the show VIP Noche and a year later on Bellezas en la nieve, alongside Andoni Ferreño, both on Telecinco. In 1994, she appeared in the series Compuesta y sin novio, starring Lina Morgan, and in 1996, she landed one of the lead roles in the final season of the comedy series Canguros, broadcast on Antena 3. She also starred in the television series Hermanos de leche, aired by the Spanish channel Antena 3 from 1994 to 1996. Also in 1996, she was awarded in France alongside Joaquín Cortés with The Best Award, as the most successful Spanish people outside of Spain.

Later, in 1998, she joined the cast of the police series La virtud del asesino, directed by Roberto Bodegas, to record episode 11. In 2000, she participated in the RTVE series, Un hombre solo.

Her leap to the big screen occurred in 1998 with Juan Antonio Bardem, who selected her to star in Resultado final. That same year, she resumed her work as a presenter, this time on Canal Nou with La música es la pista. A year later, she worked under the direction of Mario Camus in La vuelta de El Coyote. Subsequently, she appeared in the series Ada Madrina (1999), with Carmen Sevilla, and El secreto (2001).

Her most recent acting experience was the film Los años desnudos (2008), directed by Dunia Ayaso and Félix Sabroso.

In 2021, she returned to television as a participant in the second edition of the contest Mask Singer: Adivina quién canta, disguised as Flamenco.

Also in 2021, during the 15th edition of Publifestival, she received the Honorary Award for her Work as an Ambassador for Women Together for the UN. That same year, during the gala of the IX edition of Luxury Awards, held on December 14 at the Beatriz Madrid Auditorium in the Edificio Beatriz, she received the award for Lifetime Achievement in Luxury and Premium Brands Advertising.

More recently, on October 24, 2022, she began to participate as a panelist in the TV program Y ahora Sonsoles, produced by Atresmedia Televisión and broadcast by Antena 3.

== Cinema filmography ==
Mar Flores, in addition to her career as a model and presenter, has made a mark in the Spanish film industry by participating in various films. She has also participated in various television series, showcasing her talent in each of her roles. Mar Flores has had a long career in Spanish entertainment, including her participation in various television programs over the years. From her debut on VIP Noche in 1991 to her most recent appearance on Y ahora Sonsoles in 2022.

Year	Title	Character
1998	Resultado final	María José Fernández Conway
1998	La vuelta de El Coyote	Beatriz
2008	Los años desnudos	Eva Millán

Year	Title	Character
1991	VIP Noche	Presenter
1992	Bellezas en la nieve	Hostess
1994–1996	Canguros	Helena
1994–1996	Hermanos de leche	-1 episode-
1998	La virtud del asesino	-1 episode-
1998	La música es la pista	Presenter
1999	Ada Madrina	Elena
2000	Un hombre solo	Lola
2001	El secreto	Ana Carrión
2021	Mask Singer: Adivina quién canta (season 2)	Contestant
2022	Y ahora Sonsoles	Collaborator
2023	Espejo Público	Collaborator
2024	El desafío	Contestant

== Awards and recognitions ==
Throughout her career, Flores has received numerous awards and recognitions for her work in fashion, cinema, and television.

Year	Title	Organization
1996	The Best	The Best
2011	Ambassador	Women Together
2013	Fashion and Elegance Icon	Dedales de Oro Awards
2017	Ambassador	Colonial City of Santo Domingo
2021	Luxury and Premium Brands Advertising Lifetime Achievement Award	Luxury Advertising Awards
2021	Award for her work as Ambassador	Women Together

== Personal life ==
In 1996, she divorced Count Carlo Costanzia di Costigliole, the father of her first child (Carlo), with whom she had been married since 1992.

Since then, her personal life has been the subject of media attention, which reported on her romances with businessman Fernando Fernández Tapias in 1996, TV panelist and aristocrat Alessandro Lequio (1997), or also aristocrat Cayetano Martínez de Irujo (1998–1999).

Finally, she remarried Javier Merino on October 25, 2001 with whom she has had four more children: Mauro, Beltrán, and on February 26, 2011, twin sons named Bruno and Darío.

On March 25, 2016, she issued a statement announcing her separation from Javier Merino by mutual agreement.
