= MQB =

MQB can refer to:

- Mira Quien Baila (U.S.), the 2010 edition of the United States version of Mira Quien Baila
- ¡Más que baile!, the Spanish version of the Mira Quien Baila reality TV show
- Volkswagen Group MQB platform, automobile platforms produced by Volkswagen Group
- Musée du quai Branly, the Musée du quai Branly, Paris
- Postal code for Mqabba, Malta
