= Not Love, Just Frenzy =

- Directed by: Alfonso Albacete, Miguel Bardem and David Menkes
- Written by: Alfonso Albacete; Miguel Bardem; David Menkes
- Produced by: Fernando Colomo; Beatriz de la Gándara
- Starring: Nancho Novo; Cayetana Guillén Cuervo; Ingrid Rubio; Beatriz Santiago; Gustavo Salmerón; Javier Manrique; Javier Albalá
- Cinematography: Néstor Calvo
- Edited by: Miguel Ángel Santamaría
- Music by: Juan Bardem
- Distributed by: Alta Films
- Release date: 1996
- Running time: 125 minutes
- Country: Spain
- Language: Spanish

Not Love Just Frenzy (or Más que amor, frenesí in Spanish) is a 1996 adventure and drama film, directed by a triumvirate of Alfonso Albacete, Miguel Bardem and David Menkes. They have a collective name of Peliculas Freneticas (Frenetic Films). It is Miguel Bardem's first feature film with Alfonso Albacete, using Carlos Bardem, the cousin of Miguel, in his acting debut. The style of the film is reminiscent of works by Pedro Almodóvar, according to a New York Times review. Más que amor, frenesí brought Bardem, Albacete and Menkes a Goya Award nomination for Best Newcomer Director.

The cast also includes many of Spain's top young actors, including early appearances by Penélope Cruz (Vanilla Sky), Javier Bardem (Before Night Falls) and Bibi Andersen (Kika) as a high-class lesbian pimp. It is set in Madrid. The film is similar in plot to Perdona bonita, pero Lucas me quería a mí released in 1997, with both films having gay characters chasing straight men and murdered flatmates. The film is known due a gay sex scene, early in the plot.

== Plot outline ==
Gigolo Max (Nancho Novo) returns to town followed by a cop (Javier Manrique) and is suspected of having murdered one of his clients. He seeks help from a madam with a taste for young fresh girls (Bibi Andersen). Max tries to get himself back into the life of his former lover Yeye (Ingrid Rubio), who still has some feelings for him. Yeye shares an apartment with 2 flatmates, Monica (Cayetana Guillen Cuervo) who is a waitress in a gay club, called Frenzy and lovelorn Maria (Beatriz Santiago). Maria is in love with nerdy neighbor Carlos (Juan Diego Botto). Another friend is gay art student Alberto (Gustavo Salmeron), who in the opening section of the film has some steamy gay sex under the shower with Alex (Javier Albala). But he soon sadly finds out that Mr. Right is a husband and father, which quenches his desire, leaving him to get his kicks from some chaste flirtation with straight art-school model David (Liberto Rabal). The group of hot and horny twenty-something friends head out one night to a disco and crowded dance clubs to find love and adventure. They meet flashy drag queens, (who rule the dance club scene), self-absorbed gigolos, and a whole host of other characters, including an overtly masculine lesbian lover, whilst having wild sex, drugs, and gunfights. As their friends try to avoid psycho cops from infiltrating the group to get at Max.

== Cast ==
- Nancho Novo as Max
- Cayetana Guillén Cuervo as Mónica
- Ingrid Rubio as Yeye
- Beatriz Santiago as María
- Gustavo Salmerón as Alberto
- Javier Manrique as Luis (policeman)
- Javier Albalá as Álex
- Liberto Rabal as David
- Bibiana Fernández (credited as Bibí Andersen) as Cristina
- Juan Diego Botto as Carlos
- Daniel Mirabal as Divva
- Juanfra Becerra as Doly
- Paloma Tabasco as Jacky
- Nuria Gallardo as Clara
- Carlos Bardem as Miguel
- Ernesto Alterio as Marcos
- Maite Pastor as Raquel
- César Vea as Julio
- Blanca Sanromán as Elsa
- María Esteve as Chica 1
- Mónica Bardem as Chica 2
- La Calva as Cyberpunk
- Carlos Olivares as Portero
- José Manuel Cervino as (unnamed man)
- Fernando Colomo as Fernando
- Penélope Cruz as Laura
- Antonio de la Torre as (unnamed man)
- Pepón Nieto as (unnamed man)
- Amelia Ochandiano as (unnamed man)
- Luca Iezzi as Coreógrafo (choreographer)
- Miriam Akinfenwa as Go-go dancer
- Javier Albacete as Go-go dancer
- Jesús Llorente as Go-go dancer
- Elena Martín as Go-go dancer
- Raquel Roca as Go-go dancer

== Reception ==
Más que amor, frenesí was seen by 251,865 people by the end of 1996 and around 50,000 in 1997, according to Spanish Ministry of Culture. It was in the top fifty of box office takings in 1996.

=== Critical reception ===
David Rooney of Variety said in 1996, "Blithely derivative but bubbling nonetheless with energy, freshness, style and exuberant humor" and a "flashy, rather modish debut".

Robert Strohmeyer of Contactmusic said of the film, "a frantic, Chasing Amy-esque tale of seven young hipsters rampaging through Madrid on a coke-charged humping spree" and "these characters are about as predictable as they are emotionally crude".

A. O. Scott of The New York Times review in 2000 stated "the plot that scrambles together elements of farce, melodrama and film noir" and "the best parts of "Not Love, Just Frenzy" present the casual outrageousness of the characters and their milieu with humor, tenderness, and tact. The rest is just frenzy".

=== Home video ===
Not Love, Just Frenzy was released on Region 1 DVD (US and Canada) on Jan. 1 2016,
