= Veo cómo cantas (Spanish game show) season 2 =

Television game show season

Veo cómo cantas
- Season 2
- Starring: El Monaguillo; Josie Gallego; Ruth Lorenzo
- Hosted by: Manel Fuentes
- Winners: Good singers: 5; Bad singers: 3
- No. of episodes: 8

Release
- Original network: Antena 3
- Original release: 29 July – 16 September 2022

Season chronology
- ← Previous; Season 1

The second season of the Spanish television mystery music game show Veo cómo cantas premiered on Antena 3 on 29 July 2022.

== Gameplay ==
=== Format ===
According to the original South Korean rules, the guest artist and contestant must attempt to eliminate bad singers during its game phase. At the final performance, the last remaining mystery singer is revealed as either good or bad by means of a duet between them and one of the guest artists.

The contestant must eliminate one mystery singer at the end of each round, receiving €2,000 if they eliminate a bad singer. At the end of a game, if the contestant decides to walk away, they will keep the money had won in previous rounds; if they decide to risk for the last remaining mystery singer, they double their all winnings if a singer is good, or give it anyway to the winning bad singer selected by them.

=== Rounds ===
1. By the face (Spanish: Por la cara)
  The guest artist and contestant are given some time to observe and examine each mystery singer based on their appearance.
2. Lip sync (Spanish: Sincronización labial)
  Each mystery singer performs a lip sync to a song; good singers mime to a recording of their own, while bad singers mime to a backing track by another vocalist.
3. Gossip my life (Spanish: Cotillea mi vida)
  The guest artist and contestant are presented with a video package containing possible clues by one of the mystery singers.
4. Musical skill (Spanish: Habilidad musical)
  The guest artist and contestant must describe one of the mystery singer's other talents, except "singing" itself. This may not be related to the "stage of truth", but depends on their identity.
5. Out-of-tune playback (Spanish: Playback desafinado)
  The mystery singer lip syncs to the good singer's recording, then a bad singer's recording comes in the middle of the performance.
6. Interrogation (Spanish: Interrogatorio)
  The guest artist and contestant may ask questions to the remaining mystery singers. Good singers are required to give truthful responses, while the bad singers must lie.

== Episodes ==
Legend:
Good singer
Bad singer
— The contestants won the money.
— The winning bad singer stole the money.

Episode		Guest artist (Note: Players' notes: For the returning guest artists (who also include foreigners and former good singers), names are displayed in italics.; For the mixed groups, names who identified as bad singers are displayed in italics.)	Contestant	Mystery singers (In their respective numbers and aliases)								
#	Date	Guest artist	Contestant	Elimination order								Winner
#	Date	Guest artist	Contestant	By the face	Lip sync		Gossip my life		Musical skill	Out-of-tune playback	Interrogation	Winner
1	29 July 2022	Chenoa (Note: Season highlight: Foreign guest artist: Chenoa (ARG; ep. 1))	José Jiménez → €20,000	5. Sandra Zarzana; (Influencer)	4. Shiela Sánchez; (Bollywood Dancer)	8. Vanessa Chamorro; (Policewoman Trainee)	3. África Bataller; (Roller Skater)	6. Sara Illán; (Seamstress)	1. Eva Pereira; (Personal Trainer)	9. Xiluva Tomás; (Chef)	7. Tamara Chamorro; (Photographer)	2. Jessica Laugart; Sound Technician
2	5 August 2022	Antonio Orozco	Juan Antonio Egil → €16,000	4. Marlene Aquino; (Baseball Player)	3. Park Hye-min; (Manicurist)	6. Leonardo Angulo; (Michael Jackson Impersonator)	2. Jorge García; (Footballer)	5. Carlo Marmolejos; (Resort Entertainer)	9. Jimena Villegas; (Wedding Planner)	8. Cassandra Hlong; (Kayak Paddler)	7. Carolina Reymundo; (Baker)	1. Joan Martínez; Saxophonist
3	12 August 2022	Antonio Carmona	Mari Carmen Sánchez → €0	1. Ruth Jové; (YouTuber)	4. Gigi Pezzarossi; (Spinning Instructor)	6. Paula Fonseca Gómez; (Animal Lover)	9. Agustina Boticelli; (Swimming Coach)	7. Ana Sevilla; (Hostess)	3. Victor Díaz; (Butcher)	8. Iñigo Samaniego; (Surfer)	5. Darío Saez; (Showman)	2. Omar Iglesias; Breakdancer
4	19 August 2022	Ainhoa Arteta	Cayo Martín → €16,000	9. Iván Calvo; (Camp Counselor)	1. Mireia Rivas; (Stewardess)	5. Lucy Calcines; (Confectioner)	8. Jessica Lasser; (Hotel Manager)	7. Víctor Óscar Juaranz; (Acrobat)	6. Álvaro Puertas; (Archeologist)	4. Gaby Soñer; (Swing Fanatic)	2. Omar Fraile Olivas; (DJ)	3. Olana Liss; Hairdresser
5	26 August 2022	Rosa López	Marta García → €0	9. María Pascual; (Forest Ranger)	1. Ángel Morales; (Archer)	7. Luis Quo; (Magician)	3. Nani Lefem; (Fashion Designer)	4. Adib Elie; (Press Correspondent)	8. Teresa Roig; (Tap Dancer)	2. Irene Amado; (Basketball Referee)	6. Laura Arjona; (Graffiti Artist)	5. Diego Dechateau; Badminton Player
6	2 September 2022	Ana Guerra	Jonathan Pérez → €20,000	2. Miguel Astorga; (Waiter)	1. Patricia Tomás; (Stewardess)	5. Israel Montoya; (Drummer)	9. Ana Esther Gálvez; (Fitness Trainer)	6. Amanda Montiel; (Radio DJ)	8. Marta Ramos; (Camerawoman)	4. Juan Ramón Ayala; (Artisan)	3. Lucía Moon; (Gothic Lady)	7. Esteban Rivera; Window Cleaner
7	9 September 2022	Blas Cantó	Sonia Laza → €0	8. Carlos Solano; (Pump Attendant)	1. Will Cartaya; (Dog Trainer)	6. Aurora Gámez Amián; (Viticulturist)	5. Mitiku Marcos; (Pizza Delivery Man)	9. Nayara Madera; (Amazon)	3. Luis Polo; (Chiropractor)	4. Mariana García; (Basketball Player)	7. Sara Molina; (Stuntman)	2. Laura Holt; Banker
8	16 September 2022	Beret	Ana Carazo → €16,000	4. David Merino; (Image Consultant)	3. Celia Vergara; (Speech Therapist)	6. Ransel Labata; (Backpacker)	9. Ricardo Soler; (Male Nurse)	5. Lydia Carre; (Ballerina)	8. Natalia Toral; (Surveyor)	7. Antonia Nogaredo; (Cyclist)	2. Sandra Espinoza; (Clown)	1. Elena Bella; Florist

== Reception ==
Legend:
Highest rated episode
Lowest rated episode

No.	Title	Air date	Timeslot (CET)	Consolidated			Ref(s)
No.	Title	Air date	Timeslot (CET)	Rank	Share	Total	Ref(s)
1	"Chenoa"	29 July 2022	Friday, 22:15	10	11.2%	1.058	
2	"Antonio Orozco"	5 August 2022	Friday, 22:15	9	11.5%	1.027	
3	"Antonio Carmona"	12 August 2022	Friday, 22:15	13	10.7%	0.946	
4	"Ainhoa Arteta"	19 August 2022	Friday, 22:15	10	10.6%	0.974	
5	"Rosa López"	26 August 2022	Friday, 22:15	7	12.8%	1.183	
6	"Ana Guerra"	2 September 2022	Friday, 22:15	7	11.2%	1.099	
7	"Blas Cantó"	9 September 2022	Friday, 22:15	8	10.7%	1.079	
8	"Beret"	16 September 2022	Friday, 22:15	12	9.3%	1.008	

Source: Kantar Media España
