= Veo cómo cantas (Spanish game show) =

Spanish television game show

- Genre: Game show
- Based on: I Can See Your Voice by CJ ENM
- Written by: Charlee García
- Directed by: Antonio González; Jordi Rosell
- Presented by: Manel Fuentes
- Starring: Ana Milán (1); El Monaguillo (1–2); Josie Gallego (1–2); Ruth Lorenzo (1–2)
- Country of origin: Spain
- Original language: Spanish
- No. of seasons: 2
- No. of episodes: 14

Production
- Executive producer: Carlos Fernández
- Producer: Eva Barba
- Camera setup: Multi-camera
- Production company: Warner Bros. International Television Production

Original release
- Network: Antena 3
- Release: 8 September 2021 – 16 September 2022

Related
- I Can See Your Voice franchise

Veo cómo cantas (transl. I see how you sing) is a Spanish television mystery music game show based on the South Korean programme I Can See Your Voice, featuring its format where a guest artist and a contestant attempt to eliminate bad singers from the group, until the last mystery singer remains for a duet performance. It first aired on Antena 3 on 8 September 2021.

== Gameplay ==
=== Format ===
Over the course of six rounds, the guest artist and contestant must attempt to eliminate bad singers from a group of nine "mystery singers", identified only by their occupation or alias, without ever hearing them perform live. They are assisted by clues regarding the singers' backgrounds, style of performance, and observations from a celebrity panel. At the end of a game, the last remaining mystery singer is revealed as either good or bad by means of a duet between them and one of the guest artists.

The contestant must eliminate one mystery singer at the end of each round, receiving €2,000 if they eliminate a bad singer. At the end of a game, if the contestant decides to walk away, they will keep the money had won in previous rounds; if they decide to risk for the last remaining mystery singer, they double their all winnings if a singer is good, or give it anyway to the winning bad singer selected by them.

=== Rounds ===
==== Visual round ====
- By the face (Spanish: Por la cara)

s1–2: The guest artist and contestant are given some time to observe and examine each mystery singer based on their appearance.

==== Lip sync rounds ====
- Lip sync (Spanish: Sincronización labial)

s1–2: Each mystery singer performs a lip sync to a song; good singers mime to a recording of their own, while bad singers mime to a backing track by another vocalist.

- Out-of-tune playback (Spanish: Playback desafinado)

s2: The mystery singer lip syncs to the good singer's recording, then a bad singer's recording comes in the middle of the performance.

==== Evidence round ====
- Gossip my life (Spanish: Cotillea mi vida)

s1–2: The guest artist and contestant are presented with a video package containing possible clues by one of the mystery singers.

==== Talent round ====
- Musical skill (Spanish: Habilidad musical)

s1–2: The guest artist and contestant must describe one of the mystery singer's other talents, except "singing" itself. This may not be related to the "stage of truth", but depends on their identity.

==== Rehearsal round ====
- Rehearsal (Spanish: Ensayo)

s1: The guest artist and contestant are presented with video from a recording session by one of the mystery singers of their choice, but pitch-shifted to obscure their actual vocals.

==== Interrogation round ====
- Interrogation (Spanish: Interrogatorio)

s1–2: The guest artist and contestant may ask questions to the remaining mystery singers. Good singers are required to give truthful responses, while the bad singers must lie.

== Production ==
Following the success of The Masked Singer, Atresmedia formally acquired the rights to produce a Spanish adaptation of I Can See Your Voice in November 2020, with Warner Bros. International Television Production assigning on production duties.

== Broadcast history ==
Veo cómo cantas debuted on 8 September 2021, with filming taking place at an undisclosed venue in Madrid.

In January 2022, Antena 3 renewed the series for a second season, which premiered on 29 July 2022, one week after seventh season finale of La Voz Kids.

== Series overview ==
Series	Episodes	Originally released		Good singers	Bad singers
Series	Episodes	First released	Last released	Good singers	Bad singers
1	6	8 September 2021	13 October 2021	5	1
2	8	29 July 2022	16 September 2022	5	3

== Episodes ==
=== Season 1 (2021) ===
List of season 1 episodes
No. overall	No. in season	Guest artist(s)	Player order (Note: It refers to the guest artist(s) that have played in according to their first game; returning guest artists (which also include foreigners or former good singers, with their names displaying in italics) are not counted.)	Contestant	Original release date	ESP viewers (millions)	ESP share (national)
1	1	Rosario Flores	1	Natalia Izquierdo	8 September 2021	1.733	16.9%
2	2	Antonio Orozco	2	Sara Rozas	15 September 2021	1.543	14.9%
3	3	Marta Sánchez	3	Xabier Peso	22 September 2021	1.097	10%
4	4	Pastora Soler	4	Daniel Ferrer	29 September 2021	1.136	10.7%
5	5	José Mercé	5	Margue Catalano	6 October 2021	1.047	9.8%
6	6	David Bustamante	6	Ramiro Muñoz	13 October 2021	1.152	10.7%

=== Season 2 (2022) ===
List of season 2 episodes
No. overall	No. in season	Guest artist(s)	Player order	Contestant	Original release date	ESP viewers (millions)	ESP share (national)
7	1	Chenoa (Note: Foreign guest artist: Argentina — Chenoa)	7	José Jiménez	29 July 2022	1.058	11.2%
8	2	Antonio Orozco	—	Juan Antonio Egil	5 August 2022	1.027	11.5%
9	3	Antonio Carmona	8	Mari Carmen Sánchez	12 August 2022	0.946	10.7%
10	4	Ainhoa Arteta	9	Cayo Martín	19 August 2022	0.974	10.6%
11	5	Rosa López	10	Marta García	26 August 2022	1.183	12.8%
12	6	Ana Guerra	11	Jonathan Pérez	2 September 2022	1.099	11.2%
13	7	Blas Cantó	12	Sonia Laza	9 September 2022	1.079	10.7%
14	8	Beret	13	Ana Carazo	16 September 2022	1.008	9.3%

== Accolades ==
Event	Year (Note: Indicates the year of ceremony)	Category	Nominee(s)	Result	Ref(s)
Produ Awards	2022	Best Adapted Foreign Talent Reality Content	Veo cómo cantas	Nominated	
