= Mercedes Luzuriaga =

Spanish actress (1927–2023)

- Born: Mercedes López de Luzuriaga; 16 November 1927; Lemoiz, Bilbao, Spain
- Died: 11 July 2023 (aged 95); Bilbao, Spain
- Occupation: Actress
- Years active: 2005–2022

Mercedes López de Luzuriaga (16 November 1927 – 11 July 2023) was a Spanish actress known for her character Asun Sampere in the Telecinco television series Camera Café. She died on 11 July 2023, at the age of 95.

== Filmography ==
Series
Year	Title	Character	Notes
2012	Aída		1 episode («Cuando Macu encontró a Machu»)
2012	Hospital Central	Patient	1 episode
2010	La que se avecina	Balbina	1 episodie («Unos hongos, una pitonisa y un espíritu errante»)
2009	Qué vida más triste		1 episode («San Valentín de Verónica»)
2009	Cuéntame cómo pasó	Abuela de Karina	1 episode («La última cena»)
2009	Fibrilando	Asun Sempere	6 episodes
2009	Camera Cafe	Asun Sempere	22 episodes
2005	Aquí no hay quien viva	Casilda	1 episode («Érase una sequía»)

Films
Year	Title	Character
2022	Camera Café: la película	Asun Sempere
