= Mask Singer: Adivina quién canta season 2 =

Mask Singer: Adivina quién canta
- Season 2
- Hosted by: Arturo Valls
- Judges: Javier Ambrossi; Javier Calvo; Paz Vega; José Mota
- No. of contestants: 15
- Winner: Joaquín Cortés as "Erizo"
- Runner-up: Willy Bárcenas as "Plátano"
- Location: Madrid
- No. of episodes: 9

Release
- Original network: Antena 3
- Original release: 24 May – 29 July 2021

Season chronology
- ← Previous; Season 1 Next → Season 3

The second season of Mask Singer: Adivina quién canta premiered on 24 May 2021, and lasted for 9 episodes. On 29 July 2021, Erizo (flamenco dancer Joaquín Cortés) was declared the winner.

== Panelists and host ==
Arturo Valls returned as the show's host, as well film directors Javier Calvo, Javier Ambrossi, and comedian José Mota returned to the panel of 'investigators'. They were joined by season 1 winner Paz Vega, who replaced Malú as a regular panelist.

== Contestants ==
Stage name	Celebrity	Occupation	Episodes								
Stage name	Celebrity	Occupation	1	2	3	4	5	6	7	8	9
Erizo (Hedgehog)	Joaquín Cortés	Dancer	WIN			SAFE			SAFE	SAFE	WINNER
Plátano (Banana)	Willy Bárcenas	Singer			WIN			SAFE	SAFE	RISK	RUNNER-UP
Huevo (Egg)	María Pombo	Influencer		WIN			SAFE		SAFE	SAFE	THIRD
Monstruita (Little Monster)	Anne Igartiburu	TV host			WIN			SAFE	RISK	SAFE	FOURTH
Cocodrilo (Crocodile)	Bertín Osborne	Singer/TV host	WIN			SAFE			SAFE	OUT	
Dragona (Dragon)	María Zurita	Aristocrat		RISK			SAFE		OUT		
Flamenco (Flamingo)	Mar Flores	Model			RISK			OUT			
Perro (Dog)	José Manuel Calderón	Ex-basketballer			WIN			OUT			
Medusa (Jellyfish)	Mel B	Singer		WIN			OUT				
Rana (Frog)	Josep Pedrerol	Sports journalist		WIN			OUT				
Cactus	Eva Hache	Comedian	WIN			OUT					
Ángel (Angel)	Paloma San Basilio	Singer	RISK			OUT					
Mariposa (Butterfly)	Esperanza Aguirre	Former senator			OUT						
Gatita (Kitty)	Isabel Preysler	Socialite		OUT							
Menina	La Toya Jackson	Singer	OUT								

=== Virtual mask and guests ===
Stage name	Celebrity	Occupation	Appearance
Dama Centella (Lady Sparkle) (Note: Dama performed "Ven Comingo (Solamente Tú)" by Christina Aguilera on the second episode of Tras la pista de Dama Centella (On the Trail of Dama Centella) while she performed "Mickey" by Toni Basil and "Ain't Your Mama" by Jennifer Lopez on the fourth and sixth episodes of her series.)	Tamara Gorro	Influencer	Finale*
Pingüino (Penguin)	Pepe Reina	Footballer	Episode 7
Paella	Ainhoa Arteta	Opera singer	Episode 8

(*) Dama Centella will only appear in the finale, where her identity will be revealed, as it is a digital mask whose real identity can only be guessed through the clues that the official website of the program gives each week in its own format, Tras la pista de Dama Centella (On the Trail of Dama Centella).

== Episodes ==
=== Week 1 (24 May) ===
Performances on the first episode
#	Stage name	Song	Result	
1	Crocodile	"Born in the U.S.A." by Bruce Springsteen	WIN	
2	Menina	"Lovefool" by The Cardigans	RISK	
3	Hedgehog	"Vivir Mi Vida" by Marc Anthony	WIN	
4	Angel	"Walking on Sunshine" by Katrina and the Waves	RISK	
5	Cactus	"Tik Tok" by Kesha	WIN	
Final round			Identity	Result
1	Menina	"Never Really Over" by Katy Perry	La Toya Jackson	OUT
2	Angel	"(I've Had) The Time of My Life" by Bill Medley and Jennifer Warnes	undisclosed	SAFE

=== Week 2 (31 May) ===
Performances on the second episode
#	Stage name	Song	Result	
1	Jellyfish	"You Gotta Be" by Des'ree	WIN	
2	Dragon	"Se Iluminaba" by Fred De Palma feat. Ana Mena	RISK	
3	Frog	"The Business" by Tiësto	WIN	
4	Egg	"Tenia Tanto Que Darte" by Nena Daconte	WIN	
5	Kitty	"Waterloo" by ABBA	RISK	
Final round			Identity	Result
1	Dragon	"Marta, Sebas, Guille y los demás" by Amaral	undisclosed	SAFE
2	Kitty	"Last Dance" by Donna Summer	Isabel Preysler	OUT

=== Week 3 (9 June) ===
Performances on the third episode
#	Stage name	Song	Result	
1	Flamingo	"Dramas y Comedias" by Fangoria	RISK	
2	Dog	"Happy" by Pharrell Williams	WIN	
3	Little Monster	"Material Girl" by Madonna	WIN	
4	Banana	"Vida de Rico" by Camilo	WIN	
5	Butterfly	"Ella, elle l'a" by Kate Ryan	RISK	
Final round			Identity	Result
1	Flamingo	"Yo x Ti, Tu x Mi" by Rosalía and Ozuna	undisclosed	SAFE
2	Butterfly	"These Boots Are Made for Walkin" by Nancy Sinatra	Esperanza Aguirre	OUT

=== Week 4 (16 June) ===
- Ana Obregón appeared as a guest investigator.
- Group number: "Can't Stop the Feeling!" by Justin Timberlake

Performances on the fourth episode
#	Stage name	Song	Result	
1	Angel	"Swish Swish" by Katy Perry feat. Nicki Minaj	Paloma San Basilio	OUT
2	Cactus	"Quédate conmigo" by Pastora Soler	undisclosed	SAFE
3	Crocodile	"Take You Dancing" by Jason Derulo	undisclosed	SAFE
4	Hedgehog	"Hawái" by Maluma	undisclosed	SAFE
Final round			Identity	Result
1	Cactus	"Price Tag" by Jessie J feat. B.o.B.	Eva Hache	OUT
2	Crocodile	"My Sharona" by The Knack	undisclosed	SAFE
3	Hedgehog	"Quiero tener tu presencia" by Seguridad Social	undisclosed	SAFE

=== Week 5 (23 June) ===
- Chenoa appeared as a guest investigator.
- Group number: "Fiesta" by Raffaella Carrà

Performances on the fifth episode
#	Stage name	Song	Result	
1	Dragon	"Me Colé en Una Fiesta" by Mecano	undisclosed	SAFE
2	Egg	"Kings & Queens" by Ava Max	undisclosed	SAFE
3	Frog	"Solo" by Omar Montes, Ana Mena, and Maffio	Josep Pedrerol	OUT
4	Jellyfish	"Waterfalls" by TLC	undisclosed	SAFE
Final round			Identity	Result
1	Jellyfish	"Spice Up Your Life" by Spice Girls	Mel B	OUT
2	Egg	"Say So" by Doja Cat	undisclosed	SAFE
3	Dragon	"Don't Get Me Wrong" by The Pretenders	undisclosed	SAFE

=== Week 6 (30 June) ===
- Nuria Roca appeared as a guest investigator.
- Group number: "Madre Tierra (Oye)" by Chayanne

Performances on the sixth episode
#	Stage name	Song	Result	
1	Dog	"Bailando" by Enrique Iglesias	José Manuel Calderón	OUT
2	Flamingo	"Sweet Dreams (Are Made of This)" by Eurythmics	undisclosed	SAFE
3	Banana	"Billie Jean" by Michael Jackson	undisclosed	SAFE
4	Little Monster	"La Tirita" by Belén Aguilera and Lola Índigo	undisclosed	SAFE
Final round			Identity	Result
1	Flamingo	"Saturday Night" by Whigfield	Mar Flores	OUT
2	Banana	"That's What I Like" by Bruno Mars	undisclosed	SAFE
3	Little Monster	"Sonrisa" by Ana Torroja	undisclosed	SAFE

=== Week 7 (14 July) ===
Performances on the seventh episode
#	Stage name	Song	Result	
1	Little Monster	"Sin Pijama" by Becky G and Natti Natasha	RISK	
2	Hedgehog	"Wake Me Up" by Avicii	SAFE	
3	Egg	"Nunca Volverá" by El Sueño de Morfeo	SAFE	
4	Penguin	"Hola Mi Amor" by Junco	Pepe Reina	
5	Crocodile	"Live While We're Young" by One Direction	SAFE	
6	Dragon	"Tu Foto Del DNI" by Aitana feat. Marmi	RISK	
7	Banana	"Pretty Woman" by Roy Orbison	SAFE	
Final round			Identity	Result
1	Little Monster	"Rueda" by Chimbala, Omar Montes, and Juan Magán	undisclosed	SAFE
2	Dragon	"Como Tú" by Efecto Pasillo and Edurne	María Zurita	OUT

=== Week 8 (21 July) ===
Performances on the eighth episode
#	Stage name	Song	Result	
1	Hedgehog	"Por la Boca Vive el Pez" by Fito & Fitipaldis	SAFE	
2	Little Monster	"Me Enamoré" by Shakira	SAFE	
3	Crocodile	"You Shook Me All Night Long" by AC/DC	RISK	
4	Paella	"Dear Future Husband" by Meghan Trainor	Ainhoa Arteta	
5	Banana	"Chica Ideal" by Sebastián Yatra and Guaynaa	RISK	
6	Egg	"Last Friday Night" by Katy Perry	SAFE	
Final round			Identity	Result
1	Crocodile	"Purple Rain" by Prince and The Revolution	Bertín Osborne	OUT
2	Banana	"Wonderwall" by Oasis	undisclosed	SAFE

=== Week 9 (29 July) - Finale ===
Performances on the ninth episode
#	Stage name	Song	Result	
1	Little Monster	"La Niña que Llora en tus Fiestas" by La Oreja de Van Gogh	Anne Igartiburu	OUT
2	Egg	"Tusa" by Karol G and Nicki Minaj	undisclosed	SAFE
3	Banana	"Bohemian Rhapsody" by Queen	undisclosed	SAFE
4	Hedgehog	"La Mordidita" by Ricky Martin feat. Yotuel	undisclosed	SAFE
5	Lady Sparkle	"Don't Stop the Music" by Rihanna	Tamara Gorro	
First round			Identity	Result
1	Egg	"Magic" by Kylie Minogue	María Pombo	OUT
2	Banana	"Treat You Better" by Shawn Mendes	undisclosed	SAFE
3	Hedgehog	"Como Si Fueras A Morir Mañana" by Leiva	undisclosed	SAFE
Final round			Identity	Result
1	Hedgehog	"Princesas" by Pereza	Joaquín Cortés	WINNER
2	Banana	"Hecha Pa' Mi" by Boza	Willy Bárcenas	RUNNER-UP

== Ratings ==
Mask Singer: Adivina quién canta consolidated viewership and adjusted position Colour key (nominal): – Highest rating during the season – Lowest rating during the season
Episode	Original airdate	Timeslot	Viewers (millions)	Share	Night rank	Source
1	24 May 2021	Monday 10:45 pm	2.06	16.6%	#1	
2	31 May 2021	Monday 10:45 pm	1.86	15.4%	#2	
3	9 June 2021	Wednesday 10:45 pm	1.83	16.9%	#2	
4	16 June 2021	Wednesday 10:45 pm	1.82	17.5%	#2	
5	23 June 2021	Wednesday 10:45 pm	1.55	15.2%	#3	
6	30 June 2021	Wednesday 10:45 pm	1.61	15.5%	#2	
7	14 July 2021	Wednesday 10:45 pm	1.41	15.2%	#2	
8	21 July 2021	Wednesday 10:45 pm	1.31	14.0%	#2	
9	29 July 2021	Thursday 10:45 pm	1.89	20.5%	#1	
