= Carolina Cerezuela =

Spanish actress (born 1980)

- Born: Carolina Cerezuela Gil; 14 January 1980 (age 45); Elche (Alicante), Spain
- Education: Miguel Hernández University of Elche
- Occupation(s): Actress and television presenter
- Children: Carla Moyá Cerezuela; Carlos Moyá Cerezuela; Daniela Moyá Cerezuela
- Website: www.carolina-cerezuela.com

Carolina Cerezuela Gil (born 14 January 1980 in Elche, Alicante, Spain) is a Spanish actress who became famous playing Mónica Salazar in Camera Café, the Spanish spin-off of Caméra Café.

In 2001, she won the beauty prize Linda of Spain (Spanish: Linda de España). She studied Labour Relations in the Miguel Hernández University of Elche in the province of Alicante. Her acting career began in the theater aged 15, and in spite of never having studied drama, she began to work in television aged 20.

In 2007, she appeared on the cover of the Spanish November edition of FHM.

== Theater ==
- Cuatro corazones con freno y marcha atrás (1996) by Jardiel Poncela
- Hombres (1997) by Sergi Belbel.
- Te odio amor mío (1998) based on texts of Dorothy Parker.
- Criaturas (1999)
- El enfermo imaginario - Le Malade imaginaire - The Imaginary Invalid (or The Hypochondriac) (2000) by Molière.

== Television ==
=== Actress ===
- Arrayán (television series) 2003 in the role of Julia
- El Secreto (telenovela) 2002 in the role of Charlie
- La verdad de Laura (telenovela) 2002 in the role of Eva
- Paraíso (television series) 2003 in the role of Susi
- Aquí no hay quien viva (television series) 2004 in the role of Vanessa
- Paco y Veva (television series) 2004 in the role of a manager
- Camera Café (television series) 2005-2009 in the role of Mónica Salazar
- Los Serrano (television series) 2006 in the role of Candy
- Amistades peligrosas (television series) 2006 in the role of Helena García
- Manolo & Benito Corporeision (television series) 2006-2007 in the role of Lola
- Hospital Central (television series) 2007-2009 in the role of Verónica Solé
- ¡Fibrilando! (television series) 2009 in the role of Mónica Salazar

=== Presenter ===
- Esto es increíble 2006-2007
- Especial Nochevieja de Telecinco together with Emilio Pineda and Carmen Alcayde
- ¿Xq no te callas? (television series) 2008 together with Eugeni Alemany

=== Singer ===
- Manzana de Caramelo 2016 with singer Jaime Anglada as Anglada Cerezuela
