= Vicky Martín Berrocal =

Spanish fashion designer, television presenter, and actress (born 1973)

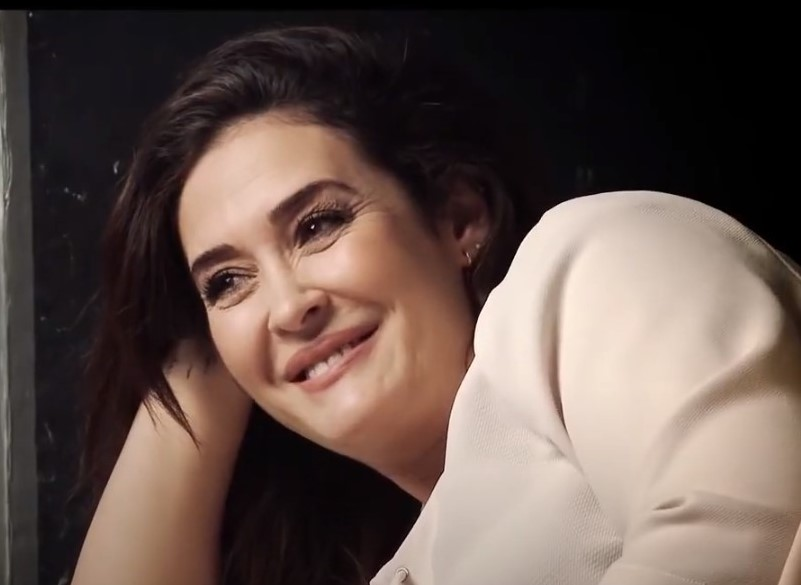
- Born: María Victoria Martín Martín; 11 March 1973 (age 53); Huelva, Spain
- Occupations: Fashion designer, presenter, actress
- Spouse: Manuel Díaz González (1997–2001)

María Victoria Martín Martín (born 11 March 1973), better known as Vicky Martín Berrocal, is a Spanish fashion designer, television presenter, and actress.

== Biography ==
Vicky Martín Berrocal is the daughter of Victoria Martín Serrano and cattle entrepreneur José Luis Martín Berrocal. She was born in Huelva and grew up in Seville. Since she was a child, she trained in the best schools in Madrid and Switzerland and graduated in Marketing and Business Sciences. She began working as an agent for bullfighters, where she met her husband Manuel Díaz González.

She later entered the world of fashion, and found success collaborating with the designer Ángel Schlesser. In this way, she began to be known internationally and to dress celebrities such as Uma Thurman, who wore her designs on the Campari calendar. Her collections include festive costumes, flamenco dresses, bridal gowns, handbags, and costume jewelry. Notably, she was hired by Anna Allen to design a dress for her to wear at the 2014 Oscars, though it was later revealed that the actress had fabricated her appearance at the ceremony using altered photographs. Martín Berrocal also had her own special edition of Nocilla glasses.

In addition, Martín Berrocal has been linked to the world of television. From 2005 to 2008 she was a participant on the Cuatro magazine program Channel nº4. In 2006, she competed in the monologue contest El club de Flo, where she finished second. In 2007, she was a judge on Supermodelo. From 2008 to 2009 she was a contestant on TVE's Mira quién baila. In addition, she debuted as a presenter on the CMM TV program A tu vera from 2009 to 2013. In 2016 she returned to television to compete in Levántate All Stars with pianist María Toledo.

As an actress, she played the role of Laura in the series La familia Mata in 2007, and in 2015 she had a cameo on the Cuatro series Gym Tony.

== Recognitions ==
In 2015, she received the Escaparate Award for best flamenco fashion.

In 2018, toy manufacturer Mattel created the "Inspiring Women" series of Barbie dolls dedicated to women who have left their mark in history, including one based on Martín Berrocal.

== Personal life ==
In October 1997 Martín Berrocal married the bullfighter Manuel Díaz González in Seville, with whom she had had a courtship since 1993. In December 1999 they had their only daughter, Alba. They divorced in October 2001. In 2018, she began a relationship with the Portuguese businessman João Viegas Soares.

== Filmography ==
=== TV programs ===
Year	Title	Channel	Notes
2005–2008	Channel nº4	Cuatro	Contributor
2006	El club de Flo	LaSexta	Contestant
2007	Supermodelo	Cuatro	Judge
2008–2009	Mira quién baila	TVE	Contestant
2009–2013	A tu vera	CMM TV	Presenter
2016	Levántate All Stars	Telecinco	Contestant
2017	Trabajo temporal	TVE	Participant
2017	#Tendencias	Ten	Presenter
2018	Volverte a ver	Telecinco	Guest
2019	MasterChef Celebrity	TVE	Contestant
2019	Vuelta al cole	Telemadrid	Guest
2020	Typical Spanish	TVE	Contributor
2020	Mi casa es la tuya	Telecinco	Guest
2020–2023	El show de Bertín	Canal Sur	Contributor
2023–2024	Tardear	Telecinco	Contributor
2026	Mask Singer: Adivina quién canta	Antena 3	Contestant as Troglodyte

=== Fiction TV series ===
Year	Title	Channel	Role	Notes
2007	La familia Mata	Antena 3	Laura	12 episodes
2015	Gym Tony	Cuatro	Victoria	1 episode
2017	La que se avecina	Telecinco		
