= The Tunnel Gang =

- Film poster
- Spanish: Los del túnel
- Directed by: Pepón Montero
- Screenplay by: Juan Maidagán; Pepón Montero
- Produced by: Arturo Valls; Félix Tusell Sánchez; José Carmona; Ana Figueroa
- Starring: Arturo Valls; Raúl Cimas; Natalia de Molina; Neus Asensi; Manel Barceló; Álex Batllorí; Abraham Fuya; Carmela Lloret; Pol López; Enrique Martínez; Manolo Solo; Marta Fernández-Muro; Roser Vilajosana; María Jesús Hoyos; Carles Arquimbau; Teresa Gimpera; Jesús Guzmán; María Alfonsa Rosso; Nuria Mencía
- Cinematography: José Luis Moreno "Moti"
- Edited by: Mapa Pastor
- Music by: Carles Cases
- Production companies: Pólvora Films; Estela Films; Lanube Películas; Toniconinormal AIE
- Distributed by: eOne Films Spain
- Release dates: 22 October 2016 (Abycine); 20 January 2017 (Spain)
- Country: Spain
- Language: Spanish

The Tunnel Gang (Spanish: Los del túnel) is a 2016 Spanish comedy film directed by Pepón Montero. The ensemble cast features Arturo Valls, Raúl Cimas, Natalia de Molina and Neus Asensi, among others.

== Plot ==
The plot tracks the interactions of a group of survivors from a disaster (they were trapped in a tunnel for 15 days) after their rescue.

== Cast ==
- Arturo Valls as Toni
- Raúl Cimas as Julio
- Natalia de Molina as Miriam
- Neus Asensi as Lupe
- Manel Barceló
- Álex Batllorí
- Abraham Fuya
- Carmela Lloret as Adela
- Pol López
- Enrique Martínez as Esteban
- Manolo Solo as José Manuel
- Marta Fernández-Muro
- Roser Vilajosana
- María Jesús Hoyos
- Carles Arquimbau
- Teresa Gimpera as Camila
- Jesús Guzmán as Segundo
- María Alfonsa Rosso
- Nuria Mencía
- Violeta Rodríguez

== Production ==
The film was produced by Pólvora Films, Estela Films, Lanube Películas and Toniconinormal AIE, and it had the participation of Atresmedia, Movistar+ and Canal Sur Radio y Televisión. Filming began on 27 September 2015 and lasted for 7 weeks. Shooting locations included Madrid and Toledo. Carles Cases was responsible for the music.

== Release ==
The film had its world premiere at the 18th Albacete Independent Film Festival (Abycine) on 22 October 2016. Distributed by eOne Films Spain, the film was theatrically released in Spain on 20 January 2017.

== Reception ==
Jordi Costa of Fotogramas rated The Tunnel Gang 4 out of 5 stars, assessing it to be reminiscent of Italian post-war comedies, and considering that, rather than featuring deliberate comical one-liners, the comedy value of the whole is relentless by relying on an "absolute confidence in a perfect and dedicated cast and a great ability to know in what voice and tone the everyday and even the trivial will turn out to be hilarious".

Andrea G. Bermejo of Cinemanía rated the film 4 out of 5 stars, describing the film as being, in addition to "unclassifiable", "wilfully comic".

Beatriz Martínez of El Periódico de Catalunya scored 3 out of 5 stars, underscoring the film to be "a little eccentricity, a rara avis out of the menu", surprising due to the "strangeness of its proposal".

Raquel Hernández Luján of HobbyConsolas scored 55 out of 100 points ("average"), deeming The Tunnel Gang to be a "strange comedy tinged with drama", highlighting the narration of what happened in the tunnel as the best thing about the film, while negatively assessing the excessive number of characters, the "irregular" pace and "certain lack of wit in the dialogues".

== Accolades ==
Year	Award	Category	Nominee(s)	Result	Ref.
2018	5th Feroz Awards	Special Award		Nominated	

== See also ==
- List of Spanish films of 2017
