= Piratas =

Spanish television series

- Genre: Adventure; Historical fiction
- Created by: Carlos Portela
- Directed by: Jorge Coira; Jorge Saavedra
- Starring: Óscar Jaenada; Pilar Rubio; Silvia Abascal
- Country of origin: Spain
- Original language: Spanish
- No. of seasons: 1
- No. of episodes: 8

Production
- Production companies: Telecinco; Mandarina

Original release
- Network: Telecinco
- Release: 9 May – 27 June 2011

Piratas (transl. 'Pirates') is a Spanish adventure drama television series with comedy elements created by Carlos Portela and which stars Óscar Jaenada, Pilar Rubio and Silvia Abascal. It aired on Telecinco in 2011.

== Premise ==
Set in the 18th century, the fiction follows the exploits of Álvaro Mondego (Óscar Jaenada), a member of the nobility who ends up captured by a pirate crew led by Captain Bocanegra (Aitor Mazo) and his daughter Carmen (Pilar Rubio).

== Cast ==
- Óscar Jaenada as Álvaro Mondego.
- Pilar Rubio as Carmen Bocanegra.
- Silvia Abascal as Blanca Díaz de Andrade, Marquise of Toro.
- Miguel Ortiz as Esteban Yáñez de Oliveira.
- Aitor Mazo as Captain Bocanegra.
- Xenia Tostado as Victoria Falcón.
- Luis Zahera as Puñales.
- Áxel Fernández as Antón Velasco.
- Octavi Pujades as Rodrigo Malvar.
- Babou Cham as Aymán Kadar.
- Xabier Deive as Fosco.
- Luis Iglesia as Intendant Gaspar Falcón.
- Luisa Merelas as Doña Beatriz Jiménez de Vicuña.

== Production and release ==
Created by Carlos Portela, Piratas was produced by Telecinco in collaboration with Mandarina. Jorge Coira and Jorge Saavedra directed the episodes. Filming began in August 2010 in Galicia. The series premiered on 9 May 2011. The first episode earned good viewership ratings (3,454,000 viewers and 17.2% share) and led the prime time slot. However interested rapidly waned and the series ended its broadcasting run on 27 June 2011 with only a 10.3% audience share, averaging 2,027,000 viewers and a 11.9% audience share across the 8 episodes. The episodes' release time was also progressively delayed by the channel.

| Series | Episodes | Originally released | | | Viewers | Share (%) | Ref. |
| Series | Episodes | First released | Last released | Network | Viewers | Share (%) | Ref. |
|---|---|---|---|---|---|---|---|
| 1 | 8 | 9 May 2011 | 27 June 2011 | Telecinco | 2,027,000 | 11.9 | |

This is a caption
| No. in season | Title | Viewers | Original release date | Share (%) |
|---|---|---|---|---|
| 1 | "Cómo nace una leyenda" | 3,454,000 | 9 May 2011 | 17.2 |
| 2 | "Diarios" | 2,443,000 | 16 May 2011 | 12.5 |
| 3 | "Mujeres de armas tomar" | 2,277,000 | 23 May 2011 | 12.0 |
| 4 | "¡Ron, ron ron, la botella de ron!" | 1,923,000 | 30 May 2011 | 10.4 |
| 5 | "Una carta para el Rey" | 1,834,000 | 6 June 2011 | 10.8 |
| 6 | "El pueblo contra Mondego" | 1,583,000 | 13 June 2011 | 11.8 |
| 7 | "La boca del infierno" | 1,445,000 | 20 June 2011 | 10.3 |
| 8 | "La X marca el lugar" | 1,259,000 | 27 June 2011 | 10.3 |
