= Javier Manrique =

Peruvian actor (1968–2025)

- Born: November 27, 1968; Lima, Peru
- Died: October 2, 2025 (aged 56); Madrid, Spain
- Occupation: Actor

Javier Manrique (November 27, 1968 – October 2, 2025) was a Peruvian actor.

== Life and career ==
Manrique was born in Lima on November 27, 1968. Throughout his career, he was credited in a number of television series and films, mainly based in Spain, including Camera Café, A las once en casa, The Day of the Beast and Witching and Bitching.

Manrique died in Madrid on October 2, 2025, at the age of 56.
