= Antena 3 Canarias =

Defunct Spanish television channel

- Country: Spain
- Broadcast area: Canary Islands
- Headquarters: Las Palmas de Gran Canaria and Santa Cruz de Tenerife

Programming
- Picture format: 576i (16:9 SDTV)

Ownership
- Owner: Atresmedia

History
- Launched: 3 November 2008; 16 years ago
- Closed: 1 April 2013; 12 years ago

Links
- Website: www.antena3.com

Antena 3 Canarias was a Spanish television channel broadcasts to the Canary Islands and in Spanish, launched in 2008. It was founded and started to broadcast in 2008. The channel was closed on 1 April 2013 by own decision of Atresmedia because Supreme Court of Spain had upheld the invalidity of TDT licenses.
