= Camera Café (Spanish TV series) =

Spanish TV series

- Jesús (Arturo Valls) and Julián (Carlos Chamarro)
- Created by: Bruno Solo; Yvan Le Bolloc'h; Alain Kappauf
- Based on: Caméra Café
- Written by: Bárbara Alpuente (2006-2009); Álex Mendíbil (2005-2009); Santiago Aguilar (2005); Álvaro López Quintana (2005); Aurora Guerra (2005); Guillermo Barrejón (2009); Ana Galán (2009); Toño García Rollán (2009)
- Directed by: Luis Guridi (2005-2009); Ana Huertas (2005); Mayjo Ruiz (2005)
- Starring: Carlos Chamarro; Arturo Valls
- Country of origin: Spain
- Original language: Spanish

Production
- Producer: Paolo Nocetti
- Camera setup: Single camera
- Running time: 45 minutes
- Production companies: Magnolia TV; Telecinco

Original release
- Release: 18 September 2005 – 1 September 2009

Camera Café is Spanish comedy TV series released in 2005 which was adapted from the French version Caméra Café. Elena Arnao was the casting director. It was directed by Luis Guridi from 2005 to 2009, who looked for new actors and screenwriters. It stars Arturo Valls, Carlos Chamarro, Carolina Cerezuela, Juana Cordero, Esperanza Pedreño and César Sarachu.

In June 2019 it was confirmed there will be a film named Camera Café: la película, which is set 10 years later with the same cast.

== Cast ==
- Alex O'Dogherty as Arturo Cañas
- Carlos Chamarro as Julián Palacios
- Arturo Valls as Jesús Quesada
- Luis Varela as Gregorio Antúnez
- Marta Belenguer as Nacha Ruiz
- Nacho Rubio as Juan Luis Lazcano
- Daniel Albaladejo as Benito Avendaño
- Carolina Cerezuela as Mónica Salazar
- Ana Milán as Victoria de la Vega
- Esperanza Pedreño as Maricarmen Cañizares
- César Sarachu as Bernardo Martín
- Mercedes López de Luzuriaga as Asun Sempere
- Esperanza Elipe as Marimar Montes
- Joaquín Reyes as Ricardo Mesa
- Ana Ruiz as Sofía Guillén
- Silvia Wheeler as Frida Lüdendorff
- Javier Manrique as Lorenzo Pérez
- Juana Cordero as Choches
- José Cerós
- Aparicio Rivero as Balmaseda
- Carmela Quijano as Nieta de Asun
- Manuel Tallafé as Paco
- Josele Román
- Charo López as Madre de Choches
- Jason Matilla as Bombero
- Jaume Sendra as Chico nuevo
- Jeremy T. Gaudet as Christophe
- Silvia Rey as Piluca Guerra
