= Aquí hay tomate =

- Genre: Tabloid talk show
- Created by: Adrián Madrid; Óscar Cornejo
- Presented by: Jorge Javier Vázquez; Carmen Alcayde
- Country of origin: Spain
- Original language: Spanish
- No. of seasons: 6
- No. of episodes: 1,234

Production
- Producers: Adrián Madrid; Óscar Conejo
- Running time: 90 minutes
- Production companies: Salta Producciones; La Fábrica de la Tele

Original release
- Network: Telecinco
- Release: 24 March 2003 – 1 February 2008

Aquí hay tomate, also known as El tomate, was a Spanish tabloid talk show broadcast on Telecinco from 2003 until 2008. It was presented by Jorge Javier Vázquez and Carmen Alcayde, both of whom became faces of the network after the show's success.

The show was produced by Salta Producciones and La Fábrica de la Tele. The show premiered to strong ratings, attributed to Vázquez and Alcayde's chemistry. The show was axed on 1 February 2008 despite still getting strong ratings.

== Format ==
Aquí hay tomate focused on tabloid stories and the world of celebrities. The basis of the programme was the stories, mostly filmed on tape, and to a lesser extent interviews with celebrity guests. The approach ranged from satire and mockery to sensationalism, which resulted in numerous complaints to the network. The show is often regarded as telebasura, or trash TV.

== Ratings ==
Series	Premiere	Ending	Average viewers	Average share
1	23 March 2003	July 2003	2,036,000	18.3%
2	2003	2004	2,843,000	24.3%
3	2004	2005	2,976,000	25.1%
4	2005	2006	2,882,000	24.0%
5	2006	2007	3,090,000	25.7%
6	2007	1 February 2008	2,588,000	21.5%
