= Animax (Spanish TV channel) =

Spanish anime Television channel

Animax (Spain)
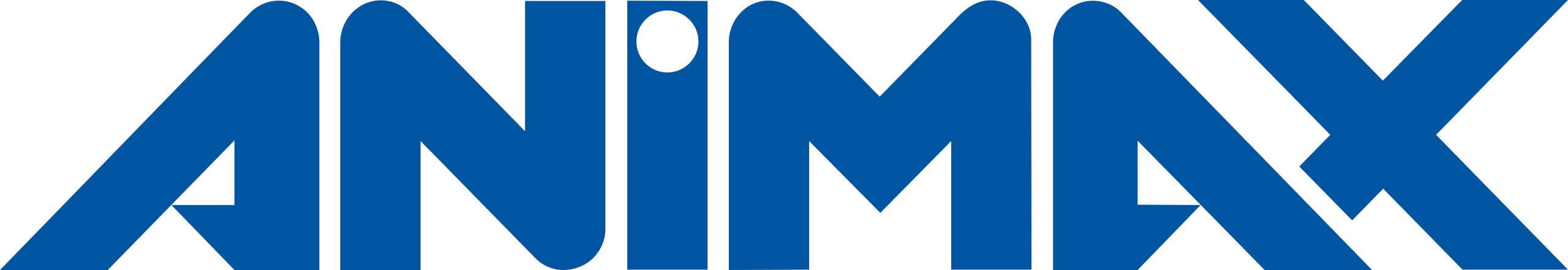
- Country: Spain
- Broadcast area: Spain
- Network: Animax
- Headquarters: Madrid, Spain

Programming
- Language: Spanish

Ownership
- Owner: Sony Corporation
- Sister channels: AXN, AXN White

History
- Launched: 20 October 2007 (programming block); 12 April 2008 (channel)
- Closed: 1 January 2014

Links
- Website: Animax Spain (archived)

Animax was a Spanish version of anime channel Animax owned by Sony. It was launched in Spain as a programming block on AXN Spain on 20 October 2007 before launching as a full channel on 12 April 2008.

Animax in Spain was shuttered on December 31st 2013.

== History ==
Animax began as a programming block in Spain and Portugal on AXN. The block aired on weekends from 13:00 to 16:00 in Portugal and Spain from 20 October 2007 until September 2008. Shows broadcast on the block included InuYasha, Outlaw Star, Trigun, Orphen, Excel Saga, Samurai Champloo, Corrector Yui, The Law of Ueki, Detective Conan, Lupin III and KochiKame: Tokyo Beat Cops.

The full channel was subsequently launched on 12 April 2008 on the Movistar TV and Canal+ platforms in Spain, and Meo and Clix in Portugal. Among the series broadcast across Animax's networks in Spain and Portugal were Nana, Black Lagoon, Love Hina, Tsubasa: Reservoir Chronicle, Chobits, Devil May Cry.

It was announced on 4 December 2013, that the channel would cease transmission at the end of the month. The channel's programming would move to different channels in the next few weeks. During the channel's final week, it would air just a repeated loop of KochiKame and Yakitate!! Japan. The channel shut down at 7:59 PM on 1 January 2014; "Yakitate!! Japan" was the last show aired.

After 3 bumpers aired between a goodbye message, it was replaced with a slide signifying the channel's shutdown.

Sony Animax diffusion on a World map, based on animaxtv.com

== See also ==
- Animax
- Sony
- AXN
