= Amistades peligrosas (TV series) =

Spanish television series

- Genre: Drama; Thriller
- Directed by: Pepa Sánchez-Biezma
- Starring: Miquel Fernández; Celia Freijeiro; Iván Morales; Daniel Grao; Carolina Cerezuela; Ismael Martínez; Mercedes Salazar
- Country of origin: Spain
- Original language: Spanish
- No. of seasons: 1
- No. of episodes: 45

Production
- Production companies: Cuatro; BocaBoca

Original release
- Network: Cuatro
- Release: 23 July – 25 November 2006

Amistades peligrosas (transl. 'Dangerous friendships') is a Spanish daily mystery television series that originally aired from July 2006 to November 2006 on Cuatro. Its cast stars Miquel Fernández, Celia Freijeiro, Iván Morales, Daniel Grao, Carolina Cerezuela, Ismael Martínez and Mercedes Salazar.

== Premise ==
The fiction follows the intrigues and secrets of a group of former friends in their late 20s, who reunite 10 years after the unresolved death of a member of the gang (El Bola) in 1996.

== Cast ==
- Miquel Fernández as Juan.
- Celia Freijeiro as Silvia.
- Iván Morales as Martín.
- Daniel Grao as David.
- Carolina Cerezuela as Helena.
- Ismael Martínez as César.
- Mercedes Salazar as Cata.
- Mariona Ribas as Amanda.

== Production and release ==
Produced by Cuatro and BocaBoca, the series was already in development before Cuatro's start of broadcasting in November 2005. Directed by Pepa Sánchez-Biezma, Amistades peligrosas began filming in June 2006. Cuatro programmed the first episode to be released in prime time, with a subsequent reschedule to the early afternoon slot afterwards. Consisting of 45 episodes, the season's broadcasting run on Cuatro spanned from 23 July to 25 November 2006, averaging about 453,000 viewers and a 4.5% audience share.

Series	Episodes	Originally released			Viewers	Share (%)	Ref.
Series	Episodes	First released	Last released	Network	Viewers	Share (%)	Ref.
1	45	23 July 2006	25 November 2006	Cuatro	453,000	4.5	
