= VIP Noche =

Spanish game show

VIP Noche was a popular 1990s game show in the Spanish Telecinco network, originally presented by the Spanish TV producer Emilio Aragón. In the show, the Spanish version of Hollywood Squares, national stars and comedians were seated in a vertical Tic-tac-toe boardgame, and they had to face questions from the anchorman, without being able to see the whole picture of the game. The first team in completing a line won the game.

In 1991, Thalía arrived in Spain and was signed as anchor and singer in VIP Noche, the variety show that was the emblem and most viewed of the original Telecinco. There she had Emilio Aragón as his partner, and they dominated the evenings’ ratings. The presence of Thalia in VIP is well remembered, and during the six months in which she was at the forefront of the space she was a magnet to attract the audience. During her participation, she sang songs from her repertoire, and starred in numerous musical versions of well-known songs, ranging from “New York, New York”, Karina's “Las flechas del amor” and Los Brincos’ “Un sorbito de champagne” to Grease, Marilyn Monroe and 'Pretty Woman' from Roy Orbison.

The program also featured a dancing group called "Las Cacao Maravillao", a group of young women wearing colorful and revealing clothes with a catchy song supposedly promoting a fictional chocolate product.

Due to the success in its native country, Telecinco remade a version for kids (VIP Guay).
