= Pilar Rubio =

Spanish television reporter (born 1978)

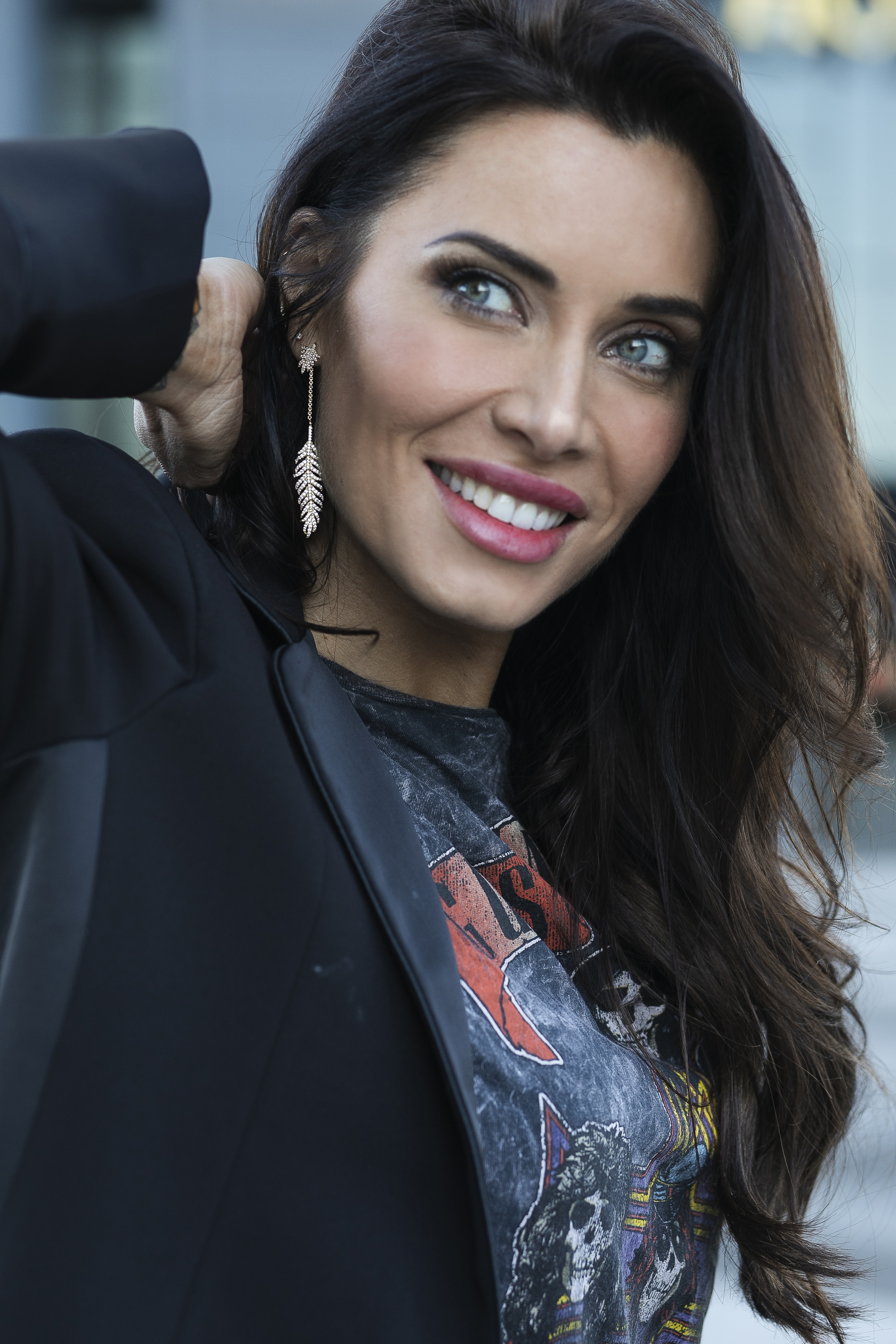
- Rubio in 2019
- Born: Pilar Rubio Fernández; 17 March 1978 (age 48); Torrejón de Ardoz, Community of Madrid, Spain
- Occupations: Presenter; actress; model
- Presenting career
- Show: Sé lo que hicisteis... (2006–2009); ¡Más que baile! (2010); Operación Triunfo (2011); El Hormiguero (2013–present)
- Stations: La Sexta; Telecinco; Cuatro; Antena 3
- Years active: 1990–present
- Height: 5 ft 5 in (1.64 m)
- Spouse: Sergio Ramos (m. 2019)
- Children: 4
- Website: www.pilarrubio.com

Pilar Rubio Fernández (born 17 March 1978) is a Spanish reporter, TV presenter and model. She became famous for covering events for the program Sé lo que hicisteis... for the television network La Sexta. From January 2010 to January 2013 she was linked to Telecinco, having hosted Operación Triunfo and ¡Más que baile!, besides of being the protagonist of the series Piratas, released in May 2011. Since 2014 has appeared as a collaborator in El Hormiguero. In 2012, she started a relationship with footballer Sergio Ramos, with whom she has four sons, they married in 2019.

== Trajectory ==
She began to study Economics, although she did not finish the degree. She modelled in several men's magazines, and appeared in the movies Isi & Disi, alto voltaje and Carlitos y el campo de los sueños, also in two shorts: Merry Christmas of Fran Casanova and Cuestión de química of Juan Moya, acting along with Cristina Peña and Arturo Valls among others. In television she has appeared in commercials Amstel, Canal+, Hyundai and in programs like Lo que necesitas es amor, The Price Is Right, La azotea de Wyoming and in Six pack, broadcast by the network Cuatro. Her definitive public success was her appearance in the comedy program Sé lo que hicisteis... of La Sexta, in which she reported diverse news articles. In the summer of 2007 she appeared in a humorous homemade videotapes program called La ventana indiscreta.

She won the award of best television reporter with Premio Joven 2007. In 2008 and 2009 she was selected as the sexiest woman in the world by the Spanish edition of the FHM magazine.

From 14 July to 29 August 2008, and in July 2009, she presented the program Sé lo que hicisteis... replacing Patricia Conde, who was on vacation. In January 2010 she was replaced by Cristina Pedroche.

She was hired by Telecinco on 12 November 2009 where she presented ¡Más que baile! and in 2011 the talent show Operación Triunfo that was canceled after 35 days due to low ratings. In May 2011 she became one of the stars of the new series of Telecinco Piratas. After 8 episodes, the series had to be withdrawn due to low ratings.

On 13 February 2012, the magazine Interviú published some of her naked photos. They were taken 14 years before for other publications of the same publishing group.

On 25 June 2012, she presented with José Corbacho the talent contest Todo el mundo es bueno, canceled three weeks later due to low ratings.

Since 2014 she has appeared as a collaborator in the comedy show El Hormiguero.

2013 was as Undead, on Annihilator's Feast album cover.

== Personal life ==
She began a relationship with Spanish and then Real Madrid defender Sergio Ramos in September 2012. It was confirmed during the FIFA Ballon d'Or gala. They have four sons.

On 16 July 2018, the couple got engaged. The wedding took place in Ramos' home-town of Sevilla on 15 June 2019.

== Television ==
- Lo que necesitas es amor, Antena 3. (1998-1999)
- The Right Price, TVE. (1999-2001)
- Esto es vida, TVE.
- La azotea de Wyoming, TVE. (2005)
- Six pack, Cuatro. (2005)
- Sé lo que hicisteis... (reporter), La Sexta. (2006-2009)
- La ventana indiscreta (presenter), La Sexta. (summer of 2007, 2008 and 2009)
- Adivina quién es quién (presenter), Canal Sur 2. (2009)
- ¡Más que baile! (presenter), Telecinco. (2010)
- Operación Triunfo (presenter), Telecinco. (2011)
- Palomitas (actress) Telecinco (2011)
- XXS (presenter), Cuatro (2011-2012)
- Todo el mundo es bueno (presenter), Telecinco. (2012)
- El Hormiguero (Collaborator) (2014-) Antena 3

=== Series ===
- Piratas Telecinco Adventure series. (2011)

== Filmography ==
- Merry Christmas (Short subject).
- Cuestión de química (Short subject).
- Isi & Disi, alto voltaje (feature film).
- Carlitos y el campo de los sueños (feature film).
- Video clip of Hamlet - Limítate
- Video clip de Hombres G - No te escaparás.
- Video clip of David Bustamante - Por Ella.
