= Mira quién baila (Spanish TV series) =

- Also known as: ¡Más que baile! (2010)
- Directed by: Josep Maria Mainat; Toni Cruz
- Presented by: Jaime Cantizano; Pilar Rubio; Anne Igartiburu
- Country of origin: Spain
- Original language: Spanish
- No. of seasons: 9
- No. of episodes: 137

Production
- Running time: 120-160 minutes
- Production company: Gestmusic

Original release
- Network: La 1 (2005-2009, 2014); Telecinco (2010)
- Release: 13 June 2005 – 21 April 2014

¡Mira quién baila! (English: Look Who's Dancing!), also known as ¡Más que baile! (English: More Than Dancing!), is a Spanish reality television show, based on the British reality TV competition Strictly Come Dancing as part of the Dancing with the Stars franchise, in which a group of celebrities competed in a dancing contest of several styles over several weeks, partnered with dance professionals. The prize that the winner obtained was given to charitable organisations of their choice.

== History ==
The program premiered on La 1 of Televisión Española as ¡Mira quién baila! on 13 June 2005. It was presented by Anne Igartiburu and produced by Gestmusic for seven seasons.

TVE gave up the rights to air the show in 2009 due to financial problems, so in 2010 the show moved to Telecinco, where it premiered as ¡Mira quién baila! but was later renamed ¡Más que baile! due to copyright issues; the new name gave the possibility of using the same acronym ¡MQB!. This season was presented by Pilar Rubio.

Televisión Española reacquired the format in 2014 retaining its earlier title, ¡Mira quién baila! and the season was presented by Jaime Cantizano.

In 2018, Televisión Española announced a new adaptation of the original format with a different title, Bailando con las estrellas. This adaptation was intended to adopt the rules of the American adaptation, with each celebrity paired with a professional dance partner throughout the series, unlike in ¡Mira quién baila! where celebrities had a different partner each episode, and weekly eliminations. The show was co-produced by Gestmusic Endemol, like ¡Mira quién baila!.

== Winners ==
- Claudia Molina (Season 1)
- David Civera (S2); 61%
- Rosa López (S3); 62%
- Estela Giménez (S4); 53%
- Manolo Sarriá (S5)
- Nani Gaitán (S6); 50.5%
- Manuel Bandera (S7)
- Belén Esteban (S8); 53%
- Miguel Abellán (S9); 51%
