= Carmen Alcayde =

Spanish TV presenter and journalist (born 1973)

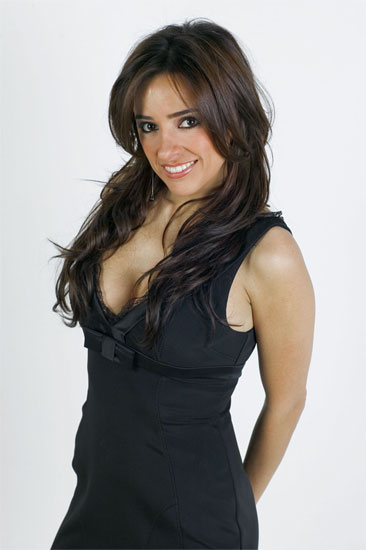
- Born: Carmen María Rosa Alcayde Ballesteros; 9 April 1973 (age 53); Valencia, Spain
- Education: Universidad CEU San Pablo (Information Science, 1996)
- Occupations: Television personality Actress
- Years active: 1997–present
- Employer(s): Telecinco (2003–2017, 2021–present); Telemadrid (2018–2022); LaSexta (2020)
- Television: Aquí hay tomate (2003–2008, 2020); El programa de Ana Rosa (2011–2015); Fiesta (2024)

Carmen María Rosa Alcayde Ballesteros (born 9 April 1973) is a Spanish TV presenter and actress. She is best known for co-hosting tabloid chat show Aquí hay tomate and for appearing on Telecinco's reality shows.

== Career ==
=== TV presenter ===
Alcayde started out in journalism, reporting for local stations in Valencia and Gandía. She became the editor of the program Todo Madrid in 2002. On 24 March 2003, she started the successful programme Aquí hay tomate on Telecinco with Jorge Javier Vázquez, which focused on tabloid gossip, attracting large audiences until its cancellation in 2008 despite criticisms of its content. She later tried a similar programme later that year, Las gafas de Angelino, which was axed after a month amid disputes between producers and the network.

In 2008 and 2009, she presented ¡Guaypaut!, the Spanish version of Wipeout, as well as 10 editions of the Guinness World Records show in 2009. She also appeared on debates of some of Telecinco's reality shows such as Gran Hermano and Supervivientes. In the summer of 2011 she stood in for Ana Rosa Quintana on her daytime chat show and started to become a more regular guest later that year. She also started to take part in some of Telecinco's celebrity reality shows such as spoof talent show Me lo dices o me lo cantas and Ven a cenar conmigo. In 2018 she started to become an occasional face on Telemadrid, hosting the tabloid talk show El madroño and hosting its coverage of the Twelve Grapes heading into 2019. In 2020, she rejoined Jorge Javier Vázquez for Sálvame Tomate, a reformat of Aquí hay tomate. Later that year she started to work on Zapeando on LaSexta. In September 2023 she was confirmed as a contestant on the reboot of Gran Hermano VIP, finishing in sixth place. Two years later, she joined Supervivientes 2025, finishing in ninth place.

=== Other ===
She made the cover of FHM magazine in June 2005.

== Personal life ==
Alcayde got married in 2003 and has two children: Carmen Lucía (born 2009) and Eduardo (born 2010).

== Works ==
=== TV ===
- 2003–2008, Aquí hay tomate in Telecinco (TV presenter)
- 2004, 7 vidas in Telecinco (Actress, 1 episode)
- 2004–2005, Special New Year's Eve Telecinco (Presenter)
- 2005–2007, 2009–2010 in Gran Hermano: El Debate (Collaboration)
- 2008, Las gafas de Angelino en Telecinco (Presenter)
- 2008–2009, ¡Guaypaut! in Telecinco (Presenter)
- 2008–2009, Guinness World Records in Telecinco (Presenter)
- 2009, Sexo en Chueca in LaSiete, Telecinco.es (Actriz)
- 2009–2010, Escenas de matrimonio 2 in Telecinco (Actress)
- 2010, Gran Hermano: El Reencuentro in Telecinco (Panelist)
- 2010, Fresa ácida en Telecinco (Presenter)
- 2010, Supervivientes: El Debate in Telecinco (Panelist)
- 2011, El programa de Ana Rosa in Telecinco (Collaboration)
- 2011, El Reencuentro: El Debate in Telecinco (Collaboration)
- 2011, El programa del verano in Telecinco (Presenter)

=== Books ===
- 2005 Treintañeras.
- 2009, Sobre Vivir en Pareja
