= Arturo Valls =

Spanish actor, comedian and television presenter

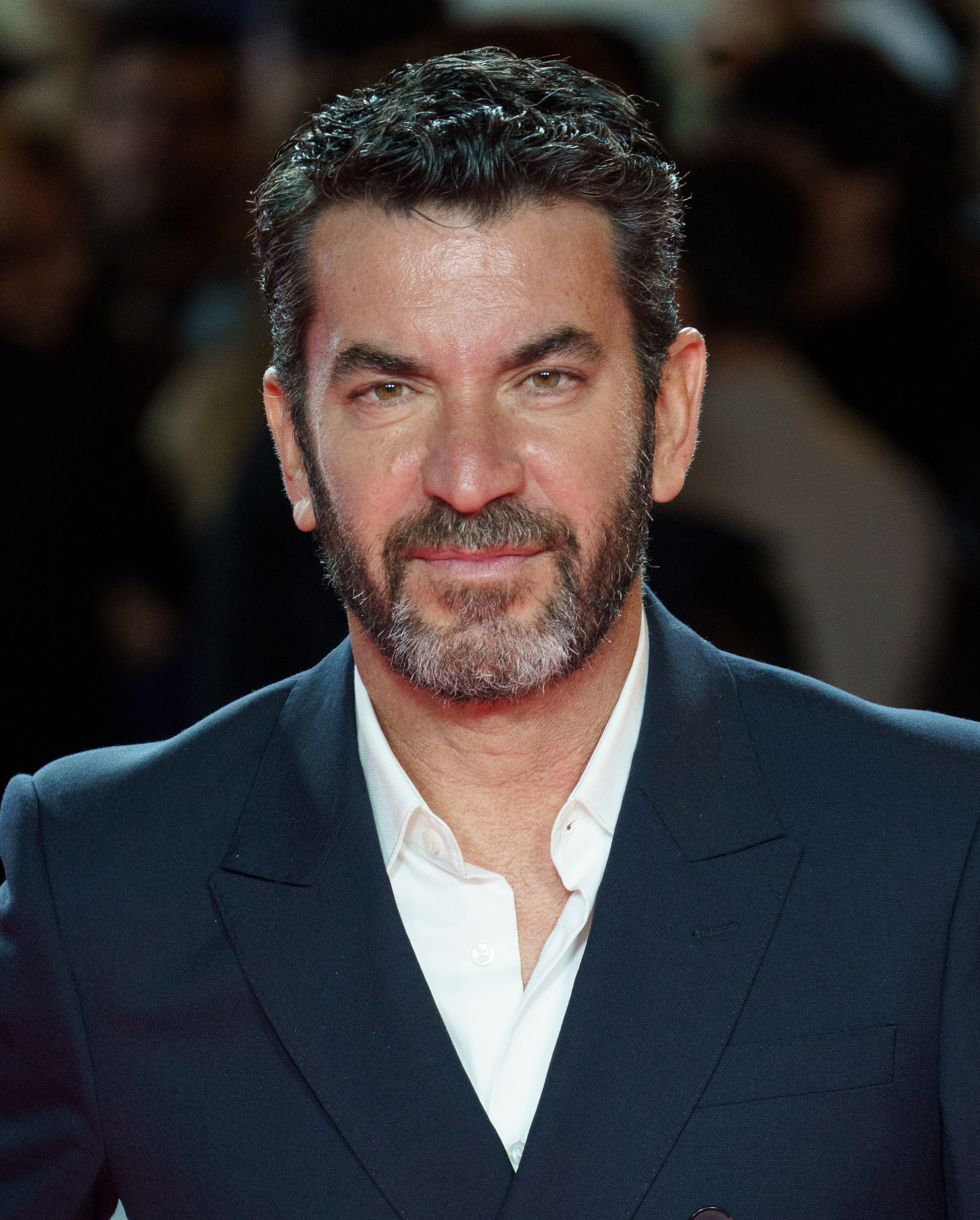
- Valls in 2025
- Born: Arturo Valls Mollà; 24 March 1975 (age 51); Valencia, Spain
- Occupations: Actor; television presenter

Arturo Valls Mollà (born 24 March 1975) is a Spanish actor, primarily featured in comedy roles, as well as television presenter. He became popular for his performance in the comedy series Camera Café from 2005 to 2009, and for presenting the format ¡Ahora caigo!.

== Biography ==
Arturo Valls Mollà was born in Valencia on 24 March 1975. He started a degree in journalism, even if he dropped out later to work as a reporter. After working for Valencian local television Valencia Te Ve, he entered national-level television by joining Gran Wyoming's show Caiga quien Caiga (CQC) in 1998. He left the show in 2002, working in shows such as X cuánto? and Licencia para mirar (FORTA) or UHF and Los Más on Antena 3. He returned to CQC in 2007 and later worked in Allá tú and Vaya tropa. From 2011 to 2021, he hosted the game show ¡Ahora caigo!.

== Filmography ==
Film

Year	Title	Role	Notes	Ref
2000	El corazón del guerrero (Heart of the Warrior)			
2001	Torrente 2: Misión en Marbella			
2007	Casual Day			
2008	8 citas (8 Dates)			
2015	Perdiendo el norte (Off Course)			
2015	Rey gitano (Gipsy King)	Gaje		
2016	Villaviciosa de al lado			
2016	Los del túnel (The Tunnel Gang)	Toni		
2017	Toc Toc			
2018	El mejor verano de mi vida (The Best Summer of My Life)			
2018	Tiempo después (Some Time Later)			
2019	4 latas			
2021	Descarrilados	Costa		

Television

Year	Title	Role	Notes	Ref
2002	Un paso adelante			
2003	7 vidas			
2005–09	Camera Café	Jesús Quesada		
2007	Aída			
2007	Gominolas	Bruno		
2009	¡Fibrilando!			
2009	Pelotas			
2010	La isla de los nominados			
2011	Museo Coconut			
2011	BuenAgente	Agus		
2013	Fenómenos			
2014	Vive cantando			
2014	Cuéntame un cuento	Nano		
2020	Justo antes de Cristo			
2022	Sin novedad			
2022	Dos años y un día	Carlos Ferrer		
