= Ana Milán =

Spanish actress

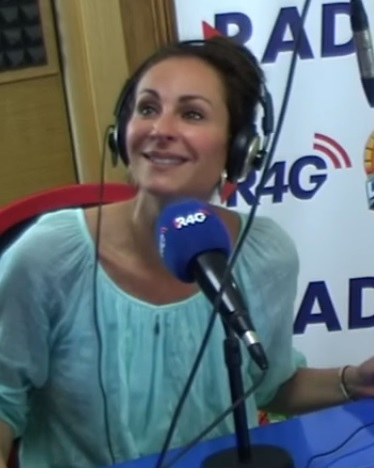
- Milán during an interview in La Jungla Radio in 2016.
- Born: Ana Belén García Milán; 3 November 1973 (age 52); Alicante, Spain
- Education: CEU Cardinal Herrera University
- Occupations: Actress; Model; Journalist; Writer
- Years active: 1996–present
- Height: 1.77 m (5 ft 9 1/2 in)
- Spouses: Jorge Juan Pérez (m. 2011; div. 2012) Fernando Guillén Cuervo (m. 2014; div. 2017)
- Partner: Paco Morales (2001–2007)
- Children: 1

Ana Belén García Milán (born 3 November 1973), professionally known as Ana Milán, is a Spanish actress, model and writer. She is perhaps best known for her roles in the television series Camera Café, Yo soy Bea and Física o Química.

== Early and personal life ==
Milán was born Ana Belén García Milán on 3 November 1973 in Alicante, Comunidad Valenciana. As a child, she lived in Almansa (Albacete) and she wanted to become an astronaut. Milán accomplished journalism studies and worked for newspapers Tribuna and La Guia de Ocio. She shares a close friendship with actress Nuria González. Her favourite film is Love Actually. Milán began her career as a model.

Milán has a son named Marco, born in 2000, from a relationship with actor Paco Morales. She and Morales split in 2007, after six years of dating. Milán was then engaged to basketball player Juan Antonio Corbalán, but they announced their split in 2008.

== Filmography ==
Year	Title	Format	Role	Notes
1996	Malena es un nombre de tango	Film		
1999	Condenadas a entenderse	Series		
2000	Compañeros	Series		
2002	5mujeres.com	Play	Ana	
2004	7 vidas	Series	Carla	
2005	El auténtico Rodrigo Leal	Series		
2005—09	Camera Café	Series	Victoria de la Vega	Nominated – Zapping Award for Best Actress
2006—07	Yo soy Bea	Series	Sandra de la Vega/ Sonsoles Prieto	Nominated – Zapping Award for Best Actress
2007	Los irrepetibles de Amstel	Play	Ana	
2008—2011	Física o Química	Series	Olimpia Díaz Centeno	Léon International Festival of Film and Television for Special Achievement; Nominated – TP de Oro for Best Actress; Nominated – Premios del Público TV for Best Leading Actress in Drama
2009	Al final del camino	Film	Imma	
2009—present	Fibrilando	Series	Victoria de la Vega	
2010	El hombre de las mariposas	Film	Unknown	(Confirmed)
2014	Entre costuras	Series	Frau Sterling	

== Awards and nominations ==
Year	Award	Category	For	Result	Ref.
2007	Zapping Awards	Best Actress	Yo soy Bea; Camera Café	Nominated	
2008	Premios TP de Oro	Best Actress	Física o Química	Nominated	
2009	León International Festival of Television and Film	Special Achievement	Física o Química	Won	
2009	Premios del Público TV	Best Leading Actress in Drama	Física o Química	Nominated	
2011	Premio 'Unidos 8 de marzo' del Grupo Zu			Won	
