= La Noria =

Spanish television talk show

- Genre: Talk show
- Created by: Óscar Cornejo; Adrián Madrid
- Presented by: Jordi González; Sandra Barreda
- Starring: Kiko Hernández; Kiko Matamoros; Lydia Lozano; Mila Ximénez; Terelu Campos; Chelo García-Cortés; María Antonia Iglesias; Karmele Marchante; Luis Rollán; Jimmy Giménez-Arnau
- Country of origin: Spain
- Original language: Spanish
- No. of seasons: 5
- No. of episodes: 245 (14 April 2012); 12 specials

Production
- Executive producer: Mediaset España
- Producer: La Fábrica de la Tele
- Running time: 150 minutes

Original release
- Network: Telecinco
- Release: August 25, 2007 – April 15, 2012

Related
- Sábado Dolce Vita; El Gran Debate

La Noria (Spanish for "The Ferris Wheel") was a Spanish talk show produced by the company La Fábrica de la Tele which aired on the Spanish television channel Telecinco from 2007 to 2012. The show was hosted by Jordi González and his special collaborator, Sandra Barneda, although it was Gloria Serra who helped him several years before. It aired weekly, every Saturday at 0:30 am. On 14 April 2012 its last episode was aired. After that the show El gran debate took its place.

== Broadcasting milestones ==
La Noria began broadcasting on 25 August 2007 during prime time. From then on, it would air weekly, hosted by Jordi González and Gloria Serra. The show was born to wash off the aggressive-hearted image that its predecessor, Sábado Dolce Vita (previously called Salsa Rosa), had left on the TV channel.

Since its beginning, La Noria gathered a historic average of 17.4% share rate and almost 1.9 million viewers, thus making it by far the most viewed TV show on the Saturday night slot, close to four points and over 400,000 viewers more than Antena 3's offer (13.8%).

On 24 April 2010, Gloria Serra, who had been the show's co-host from its start, left Telecinco to work for Antena 3 in an unsuccessful TV show called 3D. Sandra Barneda took her place on 1 May.

Something that caused many of the channel's advertisers to leave was the episode on 29 October 2011, during which they interviewed El Cuco's mother. "El Cuco" had been accused for the murder of Marta del Castillo. That day, a great part of Mediaset España's advertising companies broke their contract, which caused the company to lose a huge amount of money, and Telecinco even considered cancelling the TV show, after over four years of broadcasting. However, to avoid that, Mediaset created a new TV show which was really similar genre-wise, although more serious: El gran debate (Spanish for "The great debate"), taking La Noria's time slot. La Noria, consequently, would air during the late night slot, and so it did from 24 January onwards. In the end, the show was removed from the TV programming.

== Format ==
La Noria addressed social issues by interviewing celebrities and organising political and social debate tables, together with investigative reports.

== Sections ==
The show was divided in three main sections:

- Interviews, where they interviewed two people who had been on the weekly national or Telecinco's spotlight. The interviewees were usually related to celebrity gossiping, but there were also politicians, athletes, artists, etc. Some of its guests were Jesús Vázquez, Jorge Javier Vázquez, Sonia Monroy, María Teresa Campos, Isabel Gemio, José María García, Kate and Gerry McCann, Mercedes Milá, Mario Conde, Luis Roldán, Ana Obregón, Bárbara Rey, Sara Montiel, Bertín Osborne, Lola Herrera, Al Bano, Pitita Ridruejo and Shaila Dúrcal among many others, including politicians like José Blanco López.
- Social issues: a debate table where a team of regular collaborators addressed the social issues that had caused controversy.
- "Debate de las dos Españas" (Spanish for "The two Spains debate"): a group of journalists who were related to the world of politics would discuss those political or social issues that had caused informative confrontation between ideologically opposing social media.

== Former sections ==
- Nostalgia. A part of the show which recalled a year of the recent Spanish history from 1960 to 1990, using archive images and press reports of the time. Afterwards, a group of contributors of the programme reviewed on a debate table the events occurred on that particular year, from important socio-political questions to common life endearing anecdotes: traditional dancing music, athletes who filled Spanish homes with national pride, TV shows that captivated the audience, etc. This section was eliminated after several broadcasts, as it didn't fit with the dynamics and contents of the programme.

== Technical team ==
- Producer: La Fábrica de la Tele

=== Host ===
- (2007–2012) Jordi González

=== Co-hosts ===
- (2007–2010) Gloria Serra
- (2010–2012) Sandra Barneda

=== Co-workers and reviewers ===
- (2007–2012) Kiko Matamoros
- (2007–2012) Lydia Lozano
- (2007–2012) Belén Rodríguez
- (2007–2012) Terelu Campos
- (2007–2012) Jimmy Giménez-Arnau
- (2007–2012) Karmele Marchante
- (2007–2012) Kiko Hernández
- (2007–2012) Luis Rollán
- (2007–2012) Marisa Martín Blázquez
- (2007–2012) Marta López
- (2007–2012) Miguel Ángel Nicolás
- (2007–2012) Paloma Barrientos
- (2007–2012) Pepe Calabuig
- (2007–2012) Raquel Bollo
- (2007–2012) Cristina Tàrrega
- (2007–2011) Mia Ximénez
- (2007–2011) Rosa Benito
- (2008–2009) Jorge Javier Vázquez
- (2008–2010) José Manuel Parada
- (2008–2011) Carlos Navarro (El Yoyas)
- (2009–2011) Belén Esteban
- (2009–2011) Pilar Eyre
- (2009–2012) Beatriz Cortázar
- (2009–2012) Paloma García-Pelayo
- (2010–2012) Tamara Gorro
- (2011–2012) Makoke
- (2011–2012) Chelo García-Cortés
- (2011–2012) María Patiño
- (2011) Jesús Mariñas
- (2011) Erica Alonso

=== Debate table ===
- Alfonso Rojo
- Enric Sopena
- Isabel Durán
- Jorge Verstrynge
- María Antonia Iglesias
- Miguel Ángel Rodríguez Bajón
- Pilar Rahola
- Melchor Miralles
- Carmelo Encinas
- Emilia Zaballos
- Cuca García de Vinuesa
- César Sinde

=== Current Affairs ===
- Bibiana Fernández
- Carla Antonelli
- Irma Soriano
- Nieves Herrero
- Jaime Peñafiel
- Jimmy Giménez-Arnau
- Paloma Gómez Borrero
- Paloma Zorrilla
- Rosa Llopis
- Terelu Campos
- Pilar Eyre

== Special Shows ==
Beyond the weekly broadcast on Saturdays, Telecinco put as well on air eleven special programmes:

- Special on Julián Muñoz: third degree (Especial Julián Muñoz: tercer grado), broadcast in prime time on Friday, 28 November 2008.
- Special on Real Madrid in check (Especial Jaque al Real Madrid), broadcast in late night on Wednesday, 21 January 2009.
- Special on Economic Crisis (Especial Crisis económica), broadcast in late night on Friday, 30 January 2009.
- Special on Patricide Youth (Especial Jóvenes Parricidas), broadcast in prime time on Friday, 13 February 2009.
- Special on Paquirri (Especial Paquirri), broadcast in prime time on Wednesday, 23 September 2009.
- Special on Isabel Pantoja Report (Especial El informe Pantoja), broadcast in prime time on Wednesday, 11 November 2009.
- Special on Isabel Pantoja: Story of an ambition (Especial Isabel Pantoja: crónica de una ambición), broadcast on Thursday afternoon, 6 April 2010.
- Special on Isabel Pantoja (Especial Isabel Pantoja), broadcast on Saturday afternoon, 11 April 2010.
- Special on Princess Diaries Club (Especial El club de las princesas por sorpresa), broadcast in prime time on Thursday, 26 April 2011.
- Special on Ylenia: case closed'? (Especial Ylenia: ¿caso cerrado?), broadcast in prime time on Wednesday, 29 June 2011.

== Controversies ==
- 3 June 2007, doctor Gutiérrez Caracuel, from Hospital Universitario Virgen del Rocío (Seville), sued the show as some images of his that were filmed by a hidden camera were published on a discussion devoted to football player Antonio Puerta’s decease.
- In March 2008, Gestvision Telecinco was sentenced for manipulating an interview broadcast on La Noria to Carmen Flores, head of Asociación El Defensor del Paciente (Spanish for "The Patient's Defendant Association").
- In September 2008, an argument between María Antonia Iglesias and Miguel Ángel Rodríguez, both co-workers of the talk show, ended up with terrible insults and personal attacks.

=== Interview to Rosalía García, mother of "El Cuco" ===
This interview generated great controversy. It all began back on 29 October 2011, when the programme interviewed Rosalía García, mother of Francisco Javier García Marín (alias El Cuco), suspect of having murdered young Marta del Castillo. It seems that La Noria paid El Cuco's mother an approximate quantity of 10,000 euros. The fact that the programme paid such a quantity to this woman made Pablo Herrero, journalist and blogger, asking for the withdrawal of the programme advertisers. This triggered an unprecedented chain reaction resulting in protests from the audience in social networks and the withdrawal of all the advertisers, as they disagreed with the interview. These were such well-known brands as Nestlé, Campofrío, Puleva, Bayer, Banco Sabadell, La Razón, Bimbo, Vodafone, Mercedes-Benz, Audi, Ausonia, L’Oréal and El Corte Inglés.

This situation reached its limit on 29 November, when La Noria was entirely broadcast without advertising, except from the usual self-promotion of the channel. Due to the reduction of the income for the channel, they decided to suppress two late night programmes non-related to the original controversy, such as Enemigos Íntimos (Spanish for Close Enemies) and Resistiré, ¿vale? (Spanish for I Will Resist, Okay?), in which some of the media called the white tide and others described the great Ferris wheel effect as an attempt to clean the image of the channel. Then, the media published that the channel was gifting the possibility of being advertised on La Noria in an attempt to get back the advertisers. In the next broadcast, adverts were mainly made up of self-promotion and minor advertisers. Among the brands which were on that broadcast, Vitaldent, Securitas Direct and Microsoft announced that they wouldn't advertise themselves on that show again and Securitas blamed wrong media planning for the broadcast of their spots. A week later, the programme returned with minor advertisers. However, two well-known brands advertised themselves for the first time in the programme since the beginning of the controversy: Burger King and Conservas Isabel, both companies subject of criticism in social networking sites. Only Conservas Isabel apologised for it, and informed of their withdrawal from La Noria.

Finally, to get the advertisers back during prime time, Telecinco set La Noria aside until the late night showing (from 12.00 a.m. to 2:30 am), and created El gran debate, which was broadcast on Saturday from 10:00 p.m. to 12:00 a.m. since 14 January 2012, with the political contents and the same collaborators who made the political section in La Noria. On 25 April 2012, Telecinco announced that La Noria would be suspended, and stopped its broadcast.

One year after this controversy, and after a complaint submitted by Telecinco 19 November 2009, it was known that the blogger Pablo Herreros had been charged and called to testify because of an alleged offence of threats and intimidation. Immediately after, support was provided to Herreros by internet users and a new on-line initiative was created by journalist Mario Tascón asking for advertising companies to remove the ads of Telecinco until the complaint against Pablo was withdrawn. This initiative received more support in 24 hours than the original campaign achieved in three weeks.

Tascon's petition was signed by more than 170,000 people who also put pressure making phone calls and sending messages through social media to the brands advertised by the television network, which consequently led these brands to ask the television broadcaster to reconsider it. Telecinco decided to withdraw the complaint against the journalist after meeting Pablo Herreros on 27 November 2012.

== Average audience of every installment ==
During the more than four years where the show was broadcast (it started on 25 August 2007), La Noria was the head TV programme on its time slot on the Saturday evenings [ST?].

Installment	Date	Channel	Audience	Share
La Noria: First installment	2007 – 2008	Telecinco	2,151,000	20.4%
La Noria: Second installment	2008 – 2009	Telecinco	2,204,000	19.3%
La Noria: Third installment	2009 – 2010	Telecinco	1,991,000	16.8%
La Noria: Fourth installment	2010 – 2011	Telecinco	1,743,000	14.5%
La Noria: Fifth installment	2011 – 2012	Telecinco	1,645,000	15.2%

== Awards and nominations ==
=== TP de Oro ===
Year	Category	Result
2007	Best Crurrent Affairs and Reports Programme	Nominee

=== Micrófono de Oro ===
Year	Category	Result
2008	Best Host (Jordi González)	Winner
