= Lydia Lozano =

Spanish journalist and TV panelist

- Born: Lydia Lozano Hernández; 12 December 1960 (age 64); Madrid, Spain
- Occupation: Television personality
- Years active: 1982–present

Lydia Lozano Hernández (born 12 December 1960) is a Spanish journalist and television panelist associated with the Mediaset España group.

== Biography ==
Born in Madrid, Lozano's family is from El Paso, on the Canary Island of La Palma. After she graduated from Complutense University of Madrid in 1982 with a degree in journalism, she briefly worked as a salesperson at El Corte Inglés before being hired by Radio Nacional de España and other radio channels, such as COPE and Antena 3 Radio.

=== Tómbola ===
Lozano rose to prominence on the show Tómbola. The show aired on several Spanish-language channels between 1997 and 2004, including Channel Nou, which produced the show, and Telemadrid. The show's format featured a group of talk show hosts, including Lozano, Karmele, Jesús Mariñas and others, who interviewed guests about their personal lives. Although the program was sometimes criticized, it was popular with audiences and remained on the air for over a decade.

=== Atresmedia and Mediaset ===
The success of Tómbola prompted several private television channels, in particular Telecinco and Antena 3, to copy the format and incorporate it into their respective schedules, sometimes making it the backbone of their programming. They also hired journalists such as Lozano, who until then worked for regional television channels. Lozano began to appear in front of camera, first on Antena 3 and then on Telecinco on the program A tu lado, hosted by Emma García. Lozano co-hosted A tu lado from 2003 until its cancellation in 2007.

Lozano's unique style of journalism drew viewers and boosted ratings, which made her one of the most regular faces of the channel. She appeared on talk shows such as Gran Hermano (2004–2008), Gran Hermano VIP: El desafío (2004–2005), Salsa Rosa (2004–2005), La casa de tu vida (2004–2005), TNT (2006–2007), El ventilador (2007–2008), La Noria (2008–2012), and Abre los ojos... y mira (2013–2014). Since 2009, she has been featured on Sálvame and Deluxe.

In addition to serving as a collaborator, she has participated as a contestant in the diving talent show ¡Mira quién salta! in 2013 and appeared on Killer Karaoke. She also took part in Todo va bien, an access program on Cuatro, in which she was the subject of a hidden camera prank.

In 2015 and 2016, she participated in debates for the shows Supervivientes and Pasaporte a la isla, serving as a member of the jury for the latter. In 2016 and 2017, she co-hosted GH VIP 4: Límite 48 Horas, GH 17: El Debate, GH VIP 5: Límite 48 Horas, and Supervivientes: Conexión Honduras. She later worked on Gran Hermano Revolution: Ultima Hora.

On 20 November 2017, she was chosen by the public to host Campanadas de fin de Año 2017–2018, sharing hosting duties with four other Sálvame colleagues who were chosen by the program's management (María Patiño, Terelu Campos, Mila Ximénez and Kiko Hernández). That same night, she and her colleagues were part of the year's special, Sálvame Stars.

In 2018 she was a guest on Telemadrid's Aquí hay madroño (later, El madroño) and began to collaborate on Radiolé's Valderrama y Olé. That year, she received the Aquí Televisión award for best collaborator, sharing the nomination with Eduardo Inda and Jesús Cintora.

In 2019 the program Sálvame celebrated its 10th anniversary by airing Sálvame Okupa, a fusion of two of its star programs, which featured Lozano and other hosts from the show's history. Lozano placed second in the competition behind Víctor Sandoval.

Lozano hosted Sábado Deluxe during the interview with Belén Esteban and occasionally also presents Sálvame Limón from 16:00 to 17:00.

In 2021, she was portrayed by Lala Chús in the Atresplayer Premium television series Veneno directed by Javier Ambrossi and Javier Calvo. The same year, she won the Aquí Televisión awards as best collaborator, sharing the category with Terelu Campos, Tamara Falcó and Valeria Vegas.

== Controversies ==
In September 2001, an investigative report was aired entitled La gran mentira del corazón, produced by Melchor Miralles for El Mundo TV. César Sicre was hired for the report as an unknown actor who made people believe that he had had an affair with Mexican singer Paulina Rubio. Lozano mistakenly presented the erroneous claim as fact on a television broadcast.

Another controversy involved the case of Ylenia Carrisi, the daughter of singers Al Bano and Romina Power, who disappeared in New Orleans in 1994. For months in 2005, Lozano shared the news that Ylenia was still alive, leading the young woman's father to file a lawsuit against Lozano. Lozano was forced to make a public apology. The Complaints and Ethics Commission of the Federation of Press Associations reviewed her case and found that Lozano "lacked journalistic commitment by not telling the truth."

== Personal life ==
Lozano has two older siblings, Jorge and Esther. She has been married since June 22, 1990, to architect Carlos "Charlie" García-San Miguel y Rodríguez de Partearroyo. In June 2015, Lozano and her husband marked their 25th wedding anniversary by renewing their marriage vows. Her brother died due to COVID-19 in March 2021.

== Awards ==
- The Best Shoe Woman in Spain 2011, granted by the Shoe Museum of Elda.

== Credits ==
=== Television panelist ===
Year	Title
1997–2004	Tómbola
2001–2002	De buena mañana
2002	A plena luz
2002	Confianza ciega
2002–2007	A tu lado
2004–2005	Salsa Rosa
2004–2005	La casa de tu vida: El Debate
2003–2017	Gran Hermano: El Debate
2005–2018	GH VIP: El Debate
2006–2007	TNT
2007–2008	Gent de Tarrèga
2007–2008	Hormigas Blancas
2007–2008	El ventilador
2007–2012	La Noria
2009 – present	Sálvame
2009 – present	Deluxe
2011 – present	Supervivientes: Conexión Honduras
2013–2014	Abre los ojos... y mira
2015	Pasaporte a la isla
2015	Gran Hermano 16: Límite 48 Horas
2015–2021	Sálvame Limón (substitute presenter)
2011–2018	Gran Hermano VIP: Límite 48 Horas
2017	Gran Hermano Revolution: Última hora
2017–2018	Campanadas Fin de Año and Sálvame Stars (presenter)
2019–2020	El debate de las tentaciones
2020	La última cena
2020	Sábado Deluxe (substitute presenter)
2020	Hormigas blancas
2021	Rocío, contar la verdad para seguir viva
2021	La última cena 2 (guest)
2022	Secret Story: La Casa de los Secretos
2022	Montealto: Regreso a la casa

=== Contests and reality shows ===
Year	Title	Notes	Final position
2013	¡Mira quién salta!	Contestant	5th eliminated
2019	Sálvame Okupa	Contestant	2nd finalist
2020	La última cena	Participant (with Kiko Matamoros)	4th classified
2021	La última cena 2	Participant (with Laura Fa and Carmen Borrego)	2nd finalist
2022	Los miedos de...	Contestant	

=== Guest appearances ===
Year	Title	Role
1993–1995	Hablando se entiende la gente	Guest and Collaborator
2003	Gran Hermano	Guest
2004	Miss España Gala	Jury and guest
2005–2008	Aquí hay tomate	Guest
2006	Esta cocina es un infierno	Guest
2013	Las bodas de Sálvame	Guest
2015	Todo va bien	Guest
2015	Killer Karaoke	Guest
2015–2019	Cazamariposas	Guest
2017	Cámbiame VIP	Guest
2017	Viva la vida	Guest
2017	Informativos Telecinco	Interviewee
2018	Las Campos	Commentator and guest
2018	El madroño	Guest
2019	Todo es mentira	Guest collaborator
2019	Bien me sabe	Guest
2019	Socialité	Guest, 4 programs
2019	Viva la vida	Guest, 2 programs
2019	Gran Hermano Dúo	Guest
2020	La habitación del pánico	Guest
2020	Mi casa es la tuya	Guest
2021	Mujeres y hombres y viceversa	Guest
2021	Todo es mentira	Guest
2021	Alta tensión	Guest
2021	El concurso del Year	Guest with Boris Izaguirre
2021	Nadie al volante	Guest

=== Films ===
Year	Title	Directed by	Character	Role
2005	Desde que amanece apetece	Antonio del Real	Lydia	Secondary

=== Television series ===
Year	Title	Channel	Character	Duration
2013	Esposados	Telecinco	Lydia	2 episodes
