= Cada día =

Spanish television program

- Genre: Magazine
- Directed by: Carmen Borrego; María Teresa Campos
- Presented by: María Teresa Campos
- Music by: Federico Vaona
- Country of origin: Spain
- Original language: Spanish
- No. of seasons: 2
- No. of episodes: 260

Production
- Running time: 180 minutes
- Production company: Europroducciones

Original release
- Network: Antena 3
- Release: 9 September 2004 – 22 December 2005

Related
- Día a día (1996–2004); Lo que inTeresa (2006)

Cada día (Each Day) is a Spanish television program broadcast on Antena 3. It was presented by María Teresa Campos, who co-directed it with her daughter Carmen Borrego.

== History ==
After María Teresa Campos had spent eight seasons on Spain's most-watched morning magazine, Telecinco's Día a día, in May 2004 the rival network Antena 3 announced it had signed her to host a similar show in the same time slot. Cada día premiered on 9 September 2004, four days ahead of schedule due to the high ratings that Día a día, now presented by Carolina Ferre, was receiving.

== Format ==
The program followed the typical magazine format, combining interviews, news review, gossip, contests, tertulias, fashion, cooking, political debate, etc.

== Contributors ==
Cada día's contributors included Bertín Osborne (Defensor del famoso, leaving the program after just one month), Jaime Peñafiel, Terelu Campos, Coto Matamoros, Rocío Carrasco, Paco Valladares (in a cooking segment), María Eugenia Yagüe, Paloma Gómez Borrero, Rosa Villacastín, Cristina Tàrrega, Jimmy Giménez-Arnau, Carlos Ferrando, Jesús Mariñas, Miguel Ángel Almodóvar, Ketty Kaufmann, Josemi Rodríguez-Sieiro, Luis Rollán, Miguel Temprano, and Ángel Antonio Herrera.

The political debate panel had members such as María Antonia Iglesias, Curri Valenzuela, José Oneto, Luis Herrero, Javier Nart, Isabel San Sebastián, Enric Sopena, Consuelo Álvarez de Toledo, Ignacio Camacho, Antonio Casado, Amalia Sánchez Sampedro, and Carmen Rigalt.

In its second season, which began on 5 September 2005, Arancha de Benito joined the show.

== Ratings ==
Viewership did not meet the network's expectations. The first season ended with a ratings share of 19%, and in the second the program stood at a 17% share, almost 8 points less than its rival El programa de Ana Rosa on Telecinco and 5 less than Por la mañana on TVE. This led to its definitive cancellation at the end of 2005.
