= Tamara Gorro =

Spanish television personality

- Born: Tamara Gorro Núñez; 18 January 1987 (age 39); Segovia, Spain
- Occupations: Television personality, model, influencer
- Years active: 2009–present

Tamara Gorro Núñez (born 18 January 1987) is a Spanish television personality and model. Her popularity arose as a result of her participation as a suitor and, later on, as a member of the dating show Mujeres y Hombres y Viceversa; since then, she has collaborated and presented several television programs.

== Biography ==
Gorro was born in Segovia on January 18, 1987. At the age of 21, she was crowned Miss Segovia 2008 in the Miss Spain 2008 beauty pageant. She appeared for the first time on television in 2008 in the popular Telecinco show Mujeres y hombres y viceversa, where she was a "tronista", finally choosing Rafa Mora, with whom she ended up criticizing each other on the TV sets. After seeing the charisma of the young Segovian, she was chosen to participate in ¡Guaypaut!, presented by Carmen Alcayde, where she demonstrated her confidence in front of the cameras, knowing that her career would be in the world of television.

In 2010, while collaborating in programs such as ¡Qué tiempo tan feliz!, Mujeres y Hombres y Viceversa, or Sálvame, she was selected to participate in El Reencuentro with Oliver. That same year, she participated in the program Adopta un famoso.

A year later, in 2011, she participated in Supervivientes, along with Kiko Rivera, Sonia Monroy, and Ada Nzar, where she ended up leaving for health reasons. Between 2010 and 2011, she became a collaborator on the program Enemigos íntimos, which she left before its cancellation. She also had a role in the sketch series Becarios. She has also been a contributor to other programs such as De buena ley, presented by Sandra Barneda, Abre los ojos y mira, Resistiré, ¿vale?, Vuélveme loca and La Noria with Jordi González in the lead, all of them on Telecinco. In January 2012, she was awarded the 2011 Golden Pink Ball by the sports newspaper Sport, an award that is given to the most beautiful footballer girlfriend.

In 2013, she participated in the jumping contest of Telecinco, ¡Mira quién salta!, where she was expelled the first week after being one of the lowest rated. That same year, she worked as a reporter on the radio, on Happy FM.

From 2013 to 2014, she becomes, after the expulsion of Miriam Sánchez and Pipi Estrada, sporadic love advisor of Mujeres y Hombres y Viceversa, but she leaves it when she moves to live in Russia with her husband Ezequiel Garay, where she begins to parade on catwalks, thus resuming her work as a model. She has posed on several occasions in Interviú magazine, and has been on the cover of Primera Línea and ASMagazine.

She debuted as a presenter on the Christmas Eve and New Year's Eve galas, La noche en Paz, in 2014, alongside Joaquín Prat and Paz Padilla. The following year, she continued her work as a presenter in the same space, where she also participated in several sketches. In the same year, she launched, along with her husband, her own clothing line called "Gogga".

In 2016, she managed to become a presenter of the Russian sports program Mis reglas on Match TV, the most popular sports TV channel in Russia. That same year, she starts designing party dresses and opens a YouTube channel where she deals with aspects of her daily life. In addition, thanks to her husband's signing with Valencia Club de Fútbol, she began to collaborate on the radio program Partido a partido.

On September 19, 2017, a book entitled "Ser feliz no es gratis. Pero tampoco cuesta tanto" by Editorial Planeta.

Since mid-2018 she presents, directs and produces the program Un like para... on Be Mad, a format in which she will sit down every week with people from different fields such as Albert Rivera or Pastora Soler o know their most personal side.

== Personal life ==
She has been in a relationship with footballer Ezequiel Garay since 2010. After two years of dating, they got married on June 24, 2012, in the Madrid town of Alcalá de Henares.

In 2014, she moved with her husband to Russia for work reasons. In April 2015, they confirm through Twitter that they are going to be parents, and later, she appears on the set of Sálvame Deluxe to explain that they are going to have the baby through surrogacy. On October 11, in the state of Nevada, USA, the couple's first daughter, named Shaila, is born. In April 2017, the couple announced that they were expecting their second child.

On December 15 of that year, Tamara gave birth to their second son in Valencia, named Antonio. In June 2018, she married Ezequiel Garay for the second time in the Maldivas. In January 2022, they announced their separation through social networks.

== Trajectory ==
=== Television programs ===
Year	Title	Channel	Role
2009 - 2014	Mujeres y Hombres y Viceversa	Telecinco	Participant (2009) Love advisor (2010 - 2014)
2010	Adopta un famoso	La Siete	Participant
2010 - 2011	Enemigos íntimos	Telecinco	Collaborator
2010 - 2011	Resistiré, ¿vale?	Telecinco	Collaborator
2010 - 2013	Sálvame Deluxe	Telecinco	Collaborator
2010 - 2013	De buena ley	Telecinco	Collaborator
2010 - 2017	¡Qué tiempo tan feliz!	Telecinco	Collaborator
2011	Sálvame	Telecinco	Collaborator
2011	El Reencuentro	Telecinco	Participant - 3rd expelled
2011	Supervivientes	Telecinco	Participant - Abandonment
2012	Vuélveme loca	La Siete	Co-host
2012 - 2013	El mánager	TV Canaria/La Siete	Collaborator
2013	¡Mira quién salta!	Telecinco	Participant - 4th expelled
2013 - 2014	Abre los ojos y mira	Telecinco	Collaborator
2014 - 2016	La noche en Paz	Telecinco	Host
2014 - 2017	Supervivientes: El Debate	Telecinco	Collaborator
2016	Mis reglas	Match TV	Host
2017	Sábado Deluxe	Telecinco	Guest
2018	Un like para...	Be Mad	Host
2018 - 2019	Espejo público	Antena 3	Collaborator
2021	Mask Singer: adivina quién canta	Antena 3	Participant

=== Television series ===
Year	Title	Channel	Character	Duration
2010 - 2011	Becarios	La Siete	Tamara	6 episodes

=== Radio programs ===
Year	Title	Broadcaster	Role
2013	HappyFM	Happy FM	Collaborator
2016 - 2017	Partido a partido	Radioset	Collaborator

== Published works ==
- Gorro, Tamara (2017). Ser feliz no es gratis. Pero tampoco cuesta tanto. Editorial Planeta. ISBN 9788427043541.
- Gorro, Tamara (2019). Rendirse, nunca. Ediciones Martínez Roca. ISBN 9788427045361.
- Gorro, Tamara (2020). Entre sentimientos. HarperCollins. ISBN 9788491394716.
