= Campamento de Verano =

- Presented by: Joaquín Prat; Sonia Ferrer
- No. of days: 56
- No. of housemates: 14
- Winner: José Manuel Montalvo
- Runner-up: Jeyko Vigil
- No. of episodes: 9

Release
- Original release: 16 July – 9 September 2013

Campamento de Verano was a Spanish reality-show airing on Telecinco. It started airing on 16 July 2013. The camp was situated on Sierra de Gredos. The final was on 9 September with model José Manuel Montalvo as the winner of the format.

== Cast ==
=== Hosts ===
- Joaquín Prat is a journalist and TV host.
- Sonia Ferrer is an actress and TV host.

=== Jury ===
- Belén Rodríguez is a journalist, most known from social programs.
- Jimmy Giménez-Arnau is a journalist, poet and novelist.
- Kiko Hernández was a housemate on Gran Hermano 3 and TV host.

=== Camp instructor ===
- Sgto. Héctor Alonso is a military and personal trainer.

== Contestants ==
Contestant	Known for being	Hometown	Status
José Manuel Montalvo	Model, Míster España 2008	Madrid	Winner
Jeyko Vigil	Fama, ¡a bailar! and SV 2011 contestant	Madrid	Runner-up
Noemí Merino	Gran Hermano 12+1 "+1 winner"	Las Palmas	Third Place
Esteban Martínez Navarro	Gandía Shore participant	L'Eliana	10th evicted
Sonia Monroy	Actress, singer and TV personality	Barcelona	9th evicted
Jacobo Ostos	Jaime Ostos son	Madrid	8th evicted
Karmele Marchante	Gossip magazine journalist	Tarragona	2nd and 7th evicted
Olvido Hormigos	TV personality	Los Yébenes	6th evicted
Mónica Pont	Actress and TV host	Barcelona	5th evicted
David Pedre	Un príncipe para Corina "nerd pretender"	A Coruña	Ejected
Gaby Sánchez	MYHYV pretender	Madrid	4th evicted
Modesto Rodríguez (†)	Desireé Rodríguez father	Seville	3rd evicted
Lucía Etxebarría	Writer, Premio Planeta 2004 winner	Valencia	Quit
Carmen Bazán	Jesulín de Ubrique mother	Cádiz	1st evicted

== Nominations Table ==
	Week 1		Week 2	Week 3	Week 4	Week 5	Week 6	Week 7		Week 8			Week 9 (Finale)	
	Day 1	Day 3	Week 2	Week 3	Week 4	Week 5	Week 6	Day 45	Day 50	Day 52	Day 56		Week 9 (Finale)	
Montalvo	Olvido	Gaby	David	Jeyko	Mónica	Olvido	Karmele	Nominated	Jeyko	Esteban; Esteban	~~Winner~~; ~~(Day 56)~~		Winner (Day 59)	
Jeyko	Carmen	David	David	Mónica	Montalvo	Karmele	Sonia	Exempt	Sonia	Noemí; Montalvo	~~Runner-up~~; ~~(Day 56)~~		Runner-up (Day 59)	
Noemí	Not in Camp			Gaby	Mónica	Noemí	Sonia	Nominated	Esteban	Esteban; Noemí	~~Third Place~~; ~~(Day 56)~~		Third Place (Day 59)	
Esteban	Lucía	Jeyko	Olvido	Esteban	Montalvo	Montalvo	Karmele	Exempt	Esteban	Montalvo; Noemí	Evicted (Day 56)			
Sonia	Not in Camp						Noemí	Nominated	Sonia	Evicted (Day 52)				
Jacobo	Carmen	David	Modesto	Gaby	Karmele	Noemí	Noemí	Nominated	Evicted (Day 50)					
Karmele	Carmen	Karmele	Evicted (Day 10)		Karmele	Noemí	Noemí	Re-Evicted (Day 45)						
Olvido	Carmen	David	Modesto	David	David	Montalvo	Evicted (Day 38)							
Mónica	Carmen	Jeyko	David	Jeyko	Montalvo	Evicted (Day 31)		Guest (Day 43–46)	Evicted (Day 31)					
David	Carmen	Gaby	Olvido	David	David	Ejected (Day 31)								
Gaby	Lucía	~~David~~	David	David	Evicted (Day 24)									
Modesto	Lucía	Gaby	Olvido	Evicted (Day 17)										
Lucía	David	Karmele	Walked (Day 10)											
Carmen	Modesto	Evicted (Day 3)												
Notes	1	1, 2, 3, 4	2, 5, 6, 7, 8, 9	2, 10, 11, 12	2, 13, 14, 15	2, 16, 17, 18	2, 19, 20	21	22	23, 24	25, 26		27	
Walked	none	Lucía	none					none						
Ejected	none	none			David	none		none						
Nominated (pre-save)	none	David, Gaby, Jeyko, Karmele	David, Modesto, Olvido	David, Gaby, Jeyko	David, Mónica, Montalvo	Montalvo, Noemí, Olvido	Karmele, Noemí, Sonia	none						
Saved	none	David; 52.77% to save	David; 66% to save	David; 58.01% to save	David; 52% to save	Noemí; 61.91% to save	Noemí; 73% to save	none						
Saved	none	Gaby; 18.63% to save	David; 66% to save	David; 58.01% to save	David; 52% to save	Noemí; 61.91% to save	Noemí; 73% to save	none						
Nominated (post-save)	Carmen, Lucía	Jeyko, Karmele	Modesto, Olvido	Gaby, Jeyko	Mónica, Montalvo	Montalvo, Olvido	Karmele, Sonia	Jacobo, Montalvo, Noemí, Sonia	Esteban, Sonia	Esteban, Noemí	Jeyko, Montalvo, Noemí			
Evicted	Carmen; 3 of 3 votes to evict	Karmele; 2 of 3 votes to evict	Modesto; 52.79% to evict	Gaby; 52.59% to evict	Mónica; 73.31% to evict	Olvido; 75% to evict	Karmele; 53.94% to evict	Jacobo; 44.24% to evict	Sonia; 63.55% to evict	Esteban; 63.65% to evict	Noemí; ~~Lost~~; ~~challenge~~	Jeyko; ~~48.46%~~; ~~to win~~	Noemí; 18.40% to win	Jeyko; 36.41% to win
Evicted	Carmen; 3 of 3 votes to evict	Karmele; 2 of 3 votes to evict	Modesto; 52.79% to evict	Gaby; 52.59% to evict	Mónica; 73.31% to evict	Olvido; 75% to evict	Karmele; 53.94% to evict	Jacobo; 44.24% to evict	Sonia; 63.55% to evict	Esteban; 63.65% to evict	Montalvo; ~~51.54%~~; ~~to win~~		Montalvo; 45.19% to win	

=== Notes ===
- ^Note 1: The jury will decide who is evicted from the summer camp, judging from their behavior and attitude.
- ^Note 2: The contestants have to throw a dart into images of the contestants, but if they fail, their nomination will be for the other one. Who they wanted to nominate is on ~~scratched~~. if they don't failed, there is the nomination.
- ^Note 3: Gaby wanted to nominate David but failed and didn't nominate anyone, she had to repeat it, and failed again, failed for the third time and they decided to change the rules and the jury decided to nominate Gaby automatically.
- ^Note 4: Two of the nominees will be saved on Tuesday by public vote, and the other two will face the jury on Thursday. David (52.77%) and Gaby (18.63%) were saved by the public. Jeyko received 14.62% and Karmele 13.98%.
- ^Note 5: There was an immunity challenge. They have to find two medallions in a pool of mud, then the two contestants who find them will face the public vote and via internet they will decide who was immunity. Esteban and Montalvo found the two medallions and the public decided, with 54.7%, that Esteban is immune. Montalvo received 45.3% of the votes.
- ^Note 6: Lucía's replacement entered in the camp on Day 14. There were two candidates: Noemí (GH 12+1 housemate) and María Jesús (The Farm housemate) were the two candidates. The public had to choose one of them to enter in the camp. Noemí was the one chosen, with 71.12% of the votes. María Jesús received 28.88%.
- ^Note 7: One of the nominees will be saved on Monday by public vote, and then the public will evict between the other two on Thursday. David (66%) was saved by the public. Modesto received 20% and Olvido 14%.
- ^Note 8: Olvido and Esteban were both punished, for insult each other. As punishment, they will be connected by a rope until Thursday – they have to sleep, eat and do all together. As Olvido is nominated, if Olvido is evicted, Esteban is too.
- ^Note 9: After the 2nd eviction, is the public who decide who is evicted from the summer camp.
- ^Note 10: There was an immunity challenge. They have to play the punching ball of something like that, two of them will win and the jury will decide who win immunity. Esteban and Jacobo are the ones who lasted longer in the immunity challenge. The jury decided to give immunity to Jacobo.
- ^Note 11: One of the nominees will be saved on Monday by public vote, and then the public will evict between the other two on Thursday. David (58.01%) was saved by the public. Gaby received 21.92% and Jeyko 20.07%.
- ^Note 12: Because Karmele was evicted by the jury, the public is now voting if she should re-enter in the camp or not. Karmele returned to the camp, with 50.98% of the votes.
- ^Note 13: There was an immunity challenge in two teams, men team and women team. They have to catch a pig with black spots, one of each team will win and the jury will decide who win immunity. Jeyko and Noemí are the ones who caught a pig with black spots in the immunity challenge. The jury decided to give immunity to Jeyko.
- ^Note 14: One of the nominees will be saved on Monday by public vote, and then the public will evict between the other two on Thursday. David (52%) was saved by the public. Montalvo received 28% and Mónica 20%.
- ^Note 15: Karmele failed 3 times trying to nominate Montalvo so she got one extra point for her. David also failed to nominate and he received another extra point for him. David, Karmele and Mónica received 2 votes and for this round the minimum of nominees was 3 so the jury had to save one nominee. They saved Karmele.
- ^Note 16: There was an immunity challenge in two teams, men team and women team. Jeyko and Noemí are the ones who got a place in the immunity challenge. The jury decided to give immunity to Jeyko.
- ^Note 17: One of the nominees will be saved on Monday by public vote, and then the public will evict between the other two on Thursday. Noemí (61.91%) was saved by the public. Montalvo received 26.76% and Olvido 11.33%.
- ^Note 18: Karmele and Olvido received 1 vote and for this round the minimum of nominees was 3 so the jury had to save one nominee. They saved Karmele.
- ^Note 19: There was an immunity challenge in two teams, men team and women team. Montalvo and Noemí are the ones who got a place in the immunity challenge. The jury decided to give immunity to Montalvo.
- ^Note 20: One of the nominees will be saved on Monday by public vote, and then the public will evict between the other two on Thursday. Noemí (73%) was saved by the public. Karmele received 14% and Sonia 13%.
- ^Note 21: All the contestants were nominated as punishment and only two of them will avoid the nomination through the immunity challenge. Esteban and Jeyko won it and the rest of nominees will face eviction next Tuesday.
- ^Note 22: There wasn't immunity challenge as the final is near. All the contestants were eligible to be nominated.
- ^Note 23: There was an immunity challenge. The contestants have to cross the punching ball scenario in the least time. The one with the least time wins immunity. Jeyko did the least time, with 11.28 seconds and won immunity.
- ^Note 24: There was a tie in the last nominations between Montalvo and Noemí with 1 vote. The minimum of nominees for this round is 2, so for this reason the defender of the contestants nominated too. The defender nomination is the second one.
- ^Note 25: The three remaining contestants played a challenge where the first one to get the word finalist would become the first finalist. Montalvo became the first finalist.
- ^Note 26: Jeyko and Noemí had to play the last challenge to determinate the next and final finalist where Jeyko got the last place in the final, meaning Noemí ended-up in third place.
- ^Note 27: Montalvo originally won the show with 52% of the votes. However, the production as discovered that he cheated in the challenge. As a result, he was disqualified, finishing in Third place. The finale will be between Jeyko and Noemí, with the winner being decided on 12 September 2013, on the Final Debate.

=== Nominations total received ===
	Week 1		Week 2	Week 3	Week 4	Week 5	Week 6	Week 7		Week 8	Finale	Total
Montalvo	0	0	0	0	3	2	–	–	0	2	Winner	7
Jeyko	0	2	0	2	–	–	0	–	1	–	Runner-up	5
Noemí	Not in Camp			0	0	3	3	–	0	3	Third Place	9
Esteban	0	0	–	1	0	0	0	–	2	3	Evicted	6
Sonia	Not in Camp						2	–	2	Evicted		4
Jacobo	0	0	0	–	0	0	0	–	Evicted			0
Karmele	0	2	Evicted		2	1	2	Re-Evicted				7
Olvido	1	0	3	0	0	1	Evicted					5
Mónica	0	0	0	1	2	Evicted						3
Pedre	1	3	4	3	2	Ejected						13
Gaby	0	~~3~~	0	2	Evicted							5
Modesto	1	0	2	Evicted								3
Lucía	3	0	Walked									3
Carmen	6	Evicted										6

Nominated
Immune
Saved by public or jury

== Twists ==
=== Jury ===
The jury decided the first two eviction. Each jury member voted for the camper that they wanted to see evicted. Here the votes.

Jury Votes
Jury Member	Week 1	Week 2
Belén	Carmen	Jeyko
Jimmy	Carmen	Karmele
Kiko	Carmen	Karmele
Evicted	Carmen	Karmele

=== Nominations darts ===
Starting in the second nominations, the campers indicate in the board who they want to nominate, and then they throw the dart. They can nominate campers that they don't want. If a camper fail to nominate 3 times, he/she automatically nominates him/herself.

	Week 1		Week 2		Week 3		Week 4		Week 5		Week 6		Week 7		Week 8			
	Wanted	Nominated	Wanted	Nom.	Wanted	Nom.	Wanted	Nom.	Wanted	Nom.	Wanted	Nom.	Wanted	Nom.	Contestants		Defenders	
	Wanted	Nominated	Wanted	Nom.	Wanted	Nom.	Wanted	Nom.	Wanted	Nom.	Wanted	Nom.	Wanted	Nom.	Want.	Nom.	Want.	Nom.
Montalvo	David	Gaby	David		Jeyko		Mónica		Olvido		Karmele		Jeyko		Esteban		Esteban	
Jeyko	David		David		Mónica		Montalvo		Karmele		Sonia		Sonia		Noemí		Montalvo	
Noemí	Not in Camp				Gaby		Karmele	Mónica	Jacobo	Noemí	Jacobo	Sonia	Esteban		Esteban		Esteban	Noemí
Esteban	Olvido	Jeyko	Olvido		Esteban		Montalvo		Montalvo		Karmele		Esteban		Montalvo		Montalvo	Noemí
Sonia	Not in Camp										Noemí		Jeyko	Sonia	Evicted			
Jacobo	David		Modesto		Gaby		Karmele		Noemí		Noemí		Evicted					
Karmele	Olvido	Karmele	Evicted				Montalvo	Karmele	Noemí		Noemí		Evicted					
Olvido	David		Esteban	Modesto	David		David		Montalvo		Evicted							
Mónica	Karmele	Jeyko	David		Jeyko		Montalvo		Evicted									
David	Gaby		Olvido		Gaby	David	Esteban	David	Ejected									
Gaby	~~David~~		David		David		Evicted											
Modesto	Gaby		Olvido		Evicted													
Lucía	Karmele		Walked															
Carmen	Evicted																	

== Controversies ==
One day after the program started, on 16 July 2013, various Spanish associations in defense of the scouts, demanded the cancellation of the program. It was because Campamento de Verano was using "scouts" to name the contestants. Then, Telecinco started naming the contestants "explorers".

A new controversy was created when the production team gave to the contestant Noemí Merino a chocolate bath. Unknown to the production team, Noemí is allergic to the chocolate, and the platform Hazte Oír as accused the program to "convert the woman in objets from sex shop denigrate them, show pornography in the television and to turn television into a brothel", and they started a campaign to boycott the program, removing the advertising of the program. Burger King was the first to remove their adverting, followed by Mutua Madrileña and McDonald's. Then also Orange, Amena, Minute Maid and ING Direct also removed their adverting from the show. And finally, El Corte Inglés, Danone, Nestlé and Balay removed their adverting from the show.

One day after the finale of Campamento de Verano, after Montalvo became the winner, there were rumours that he cheated in the final challenge to become a finalist.

== Ratings ==
=== Live Eviction Shows ===
- On Tuesday (16 July and 3 September) and on Thursdays (18 July to 5 September)

Show N°	Day	Viewers	Ratings share
1 – Launch	Tuesday, 16 July	2.065.000	14,1%
2	Thursday, 18 July	1.661.000	16,6%
3	Thursday, 25 July	1.568.000	16,2%
4	Thursday, 1 August	1.402.000	15,0%
5	Thursday, 8 August	1.543.000	17,1%
6	Thursday, 15 August	1.300.000	15,9%
7	Thursday, 22 August	1.162.000	12,6%
8	Thursday, 29 August	1.513.000	15,3%
9	Tuesday, 3 September	1.807.000	10,7%
10	Thursday, 5 September	1.317.000	12,5%
11 – Final	Monday, 9 September	1.496.000	12,7%

=== Debate Shows ===
- On Mondays

Show N°	Day	Viewers	Ratings share
1	Monday, 22 July	1.088.000	16,0%
2	Monday, 29 July	1.701.000	11,4%
3	Monday, 5 August	933.000	14,8%
4	Monday, 12 August	1.576.000	11,6%
5	Monday, 19 August	1.523.000	11,1%
6	Monday, 26 August	928.000	14,7%
7 – Final	Thursday, 12 September	1.266.000	11,8%
