= Carmen Borrego =

Spanish television personality

- Born: María del Carmen Borrego Campos; 11 October 1966 (age 59); Málaga, Spain
- Occupation: Television personality
- Spouses: Francisco Almoguera Haro (m. 1989; div. 1996) José Carlos Bernal Zamorano (m. 2014)
- Children: 2
- Parent: María Teresa Campos

María del Carmen Borrego Campos (born 11 October 1966) is a Spanish television program director and collaborator. She is the daughter of journalist María Teresa Campos, and sister of the presenter Terelu Campos.

== Biography ==
María del Carmen was born on 30 October 1966. She is the youngest daughter of late journalist José María Borrego Doblas and journalist María Teresa Campos Luque. She is the younger sister of television presenter Terelu Campos. Her first job was in radio, at Cadena SER, where she worked as a producer with Iñaki Gabilondo. Later, she jumped to television, working for nine years on the news programs of the pay channel Canal+.

In 1996, she became assistant director of the Telecinco program Día a día, until 2004. Subsequently, she moved to Antena 3 with Cada día presented by her mother, María Teresa Campos, until 2005. She has continued to direct in autonomous programs such as Cerca de ti and A tu vera since that year.

In 2016, she became mostly known thanks to her participation as the protagonist, along with her mother and sister, in the docu reality Las Campos, a production of La Fábrica de la Tele that aired on Telecinco between 2016 and 2018. She has since appeared in several Mediaset programs, including Sálvame, Sábado Deluxe, Mujeres y hombres y viceversa, El debate de Supervivientes and Viva la vida, in addition to being a contestant (and winner) of Ven a cenar conmigo: Gourmet edition (in which she competes with El Dioni, Víctor Sandoval and Bibiana Fernández. She has also served on the jury for the program A tu vera mini.

In 2020, she debuted as an actress in the Atresplayer TV series Veneno, where she plays a TV collaborator in one episode.

In 2021, Carmen returned to the program Sálvame, becoming, together with the model Alba Carrillo, the new incorporation.

== Personal life ==
In 1989 she married sound technician Francisco Almoguera Haro, with whom she had two children. After seven years of marriage, the couple divorced.

On 18 July 2014, she married businessman José Carlos Bernal Zamorano, whom she met while working at Canal Sur.

== Trajectory ==
=== Television programs ===
No known academic major.

As a director

Year	Title	Channel
1995–1996	Lo + Plus	Canal+
1996–2004	Día a día	Telecinco
2001	Tu dirás	Telecinco
2004–2005	Cada día	Antena 3
2004	Mirando al mar	Antena 3
2006	Lo que inTeresa	Antena 3
2008–2009	El día es nuestro	Canal Extremadura
2009–2014	A tu vera	Castilla–La Mancha Televisión
2010	En boca de todos	La 10
2010	Curri y Compañía	La 10
2011–2014	Cerca de ti	Castilla–La Mancha Televisión / Canal Sur

As a collaborator

Year	Title	Channel	Role
2016–2018	Las Campos	Telecinco	Starring in the reality docu
2017–present	Supervivientes: Conexión Honduras	Telecinco	Collaborator
2017	A tu vera mini	Castilla–La Mancha Televisión	Jury member
2017	Mujeres y hombres y viceversa	Telecinco	Opinionist
2017–2019; 2021–present	Sálvame	Telecinco	Collaborator
2017–2019; 2021–present	Sábado Deluxe	Telecinco	Collaborator
2019–2021	Viva la vida	Telecinco	Collaborator
2019–2021	Deluxe	Telecinco	Guest
2019	Sálvame Okupa	Telecinco	Contestant (Fourth expelled)
2020	Ven a cenar conmigo: Gourmet edition	Cuatro	Participant (Winner)
2020	Esta Pasando	Telemadrid	Collaborator
2021	La última cena	Telecinco	Participant (Second runner–up)
2021	<i id="mwAQc">Viva el verano</i>	Telecinco	Collaborator
2022	Supervivientes	Telecinco	Contestant

=== Television series ===
Year	Title	Character	Cadena	Notes
2020	Veneno	Carmen, Collaborator de televisión	Atresplayer	Episode: «Los tres entierros de Cristina Ortiz»
