= Karmele Marchante =

Spanish television personality

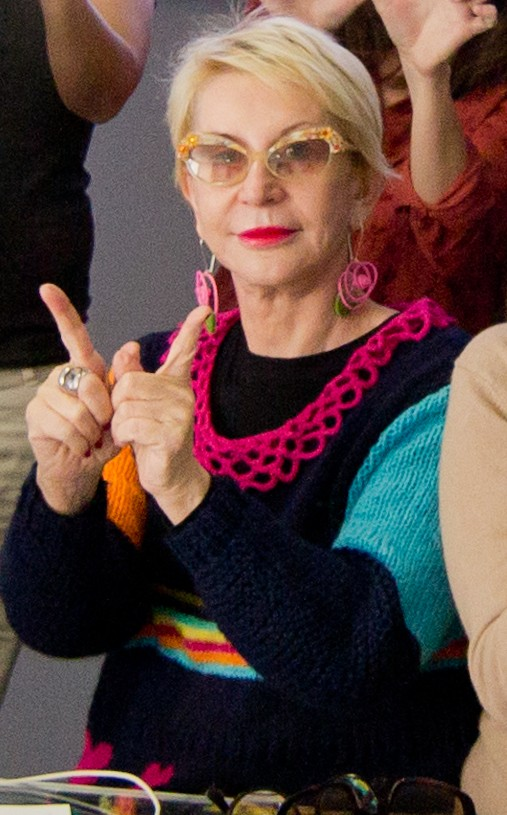
- Karmele Marchante in 2015
- Born: María del Carmen Marchante Barrobés; 15 September 1946 (age 79); Tortosa, Spain
- Occupation: Television personality
- Years active: 1981–present

María del Carmen Marchante Barrobés (born 15 September 1946, Tortosa, Tarragona), better known as Karmele Marchante, is a Spanish journalist and feminist with an extensive career in all media and also known for her time in the tabloids.

== Early years ==
She studied at the University of Navarra and at the Official School of Journalism in Barcelona. After finishing her studies, she worked for Unesco in París in 1973. She then married an Icelandic linguist and moved to Iceland, where she lived and worked as a flying reporter. After three years, she got a divorce and moved back to Barcelona, where she worked in newspapers and radio and got involved with Spanish feminism by starting the group LAMAR (the Antipatriarchal Struggle of Antiauthoritarian and Revolutionary Women).

In 1981, together with María Rodrguez Bayraguet, she translated for the Icaria publishing house in Barcelona the book by Ayatollah Jomeini entitled Principios políticos, filosóficos, sociales y religiosos, which had great repercussions. While still in Barcelona, Marchante edited the magazine Star and co–founded the magazine Ajoblanco, both of which were references to countercultural journalism in the 80's in Spain.

In 1984, she moved to Madrid, where she began her television career in the program Informe Semanal, of Televisión Española, with outstanding reports on politics, interviewing, among others, Adolfo Suárez, already ex–president of the Spanish Government, and Josep Tarradellas, recently elected president of Catalonia. Her reports on culture, such as that of Michael Jackson, also stood out.

== Trajectory ==
She worked in the Interviú magazine's Barcelona editorial office between 1977 and 1984 In 1984, she joined Televisión Española and moved to Madrid. At the public broadcaster, she made reports for programs such as Informe Semanal or La Tarde and also participated in others such as Segundos fuera (1986) and Radio Nacional de España. At the end of the 1980s, she returned to the private media, working for a decade for the Grupo Z weeklies Panorama Internacional (1987– 1988) and Tiempo (1988–1997) doing interviews, opinion columns, and social chronicles. She combined written journalism with radio (she replaced Jesús Mariñas in the COPE channel's Protagonistas by Luis del Olmo in 1988) and television collaborations. She hosted several programs on regional channels and hosted a segment of Antena 3 Noticias called Las noticias del corazón (1990) on the newly launched Antena 3. She worked on Gran Wyoming's La noche se mueve (1993) in Telemadrid; Julián Lago's La máquina de la verdad (1993, 1994) in Telecinco and Pasa la vida (1993– 1996), Tardes con Teresa (1994) and Día a día (1996– 1997) by María Teresa Campos, in La 1 and Telecinco.

Regarding her feminist and research aspects, in 1994 she founded the group El Club de las 25, which brings together women from different sectors for the active struggle in feminism. At this time, Marchante combined her work as a journalist with a stay in Washington D. C. thanks to a Fulbright scholarship, and another later at the University of Debrecen, in Hungary.

In 1997, she arrived at Tómbola, where she held a chair for 7 years. She focused her career on television, and her popularity grew rapidly, including making advertising spots, participating in reality shows, and giving paid interviews. Tómbola was a novel format in Spain, in which several journalists would focus–sometimes in a reproachful tone and with an aggressive attitude–on aspects of the interviewed person's private life. This type of program, controversial in content and form, was subsequently imitated by all the networks. The verbal confrontations between Marchante and Jesús Mariñas (author of the then famous phrase "que te calles Karmele!"), one of her colleagues on the set, became famous.

After the cancellation of Tómbola, Marchante continued her career on national channels, collaborating as an expert in politics and current affairs in programs such as Como la vida (2003–2004), on Antena 3, or on Telecinco in Día a día (2004), by María Teresa Campos, TNT (2004–2007), by Jordi González or A tu lado (2004–2007), by Emma García. It also highlights the program Temporada Alta Alta of the Balearic regional channel IB3. In 2008, she participated in the contest Supervivientes, broadcast by Telecinco, in which she was sometimes reprimanded by other contestants due to her physical condition and her peculiar personality, especially during the group tests. She was the 6th expelled from the contest that would later be won by Miriam Sánchez.

=== Sálvame and La Noria ===
In 2009, she began collaborating in the Telecinco program Sálvame, hosted by Jorge Javier Vázquez, where she starred in comedic moments such as her Eurovision Song Contest 2010 entry as Pop Star Queen. And she presented three songs: Soy un tsunami, La Carmelita, and Las mujeres al poder, of which Soy un tsunami was chosen, which placed first in the internet voting. Defender also of transsexual people and the homosexual collective in general, two transsexuals appeared in the video clip of Soy un Tsunami, so she was chosen to give a proclamation at the Gay Pride of Madrid in 2010. Despite her success in the vote, her candidacy was rejected three days after the opening of the voting by RTVE, after it was known that some parts of the song did not comply with the regulations of the European Broadcasting Union.

She leaves the program in May 2011 to travel to England, only to return a few months later at the program's request.In 2016, Marchante left it definitively, saying that she felt "humiliated, vexed, insulted, and mistreated" by the program's team and its direction, among other things, for her positions as a feminist and Catalan pro–independence. After leaving, she declared that having worked in the heart press had been the biggest mistake of her life.

In parallel to her stint in Sálvame as an interviewer of popular characters in La Noria (2008–2012), until the program was canceled due to lack of advertisers. On 16 July 2013, she began participating in the new Telecinco contest called Campamento de Verano, a reality show presented by Joaqun Prat from the central studios of Mediaset España and with her co–host Sonia Ferrer from the Sierra de Gredos.

In the summer of 2015, her signing was made public as a collaborator for the program La vida on Catalunya Ràdio. In 2018, she began working on Espejo público of Antena 3, as well as TV3. In the meantime, she launches her social media career with a current affairs YouTube channel.

== Published works ==
- 2003 – Arquetipos y arquetipas: la fauna rosa. Editorial Planeta.
- 2011 – Los juguetes de Karmele. Editorial La Esfera.
- 2018 – Puta no se nace. Editorial Lo que no existe.
