= Sandra Barneda =

Spanish writer and actress (born 1975)

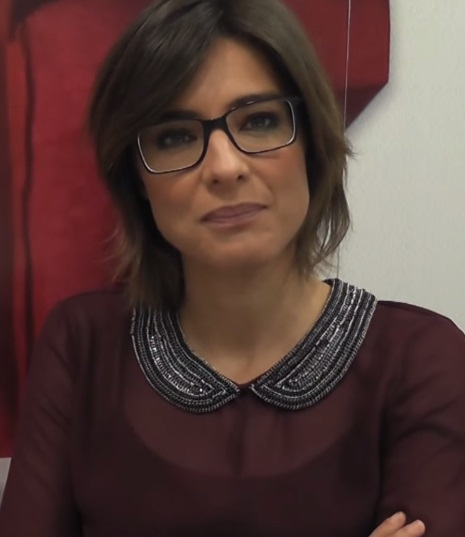
- Barneda in 2012
- Born: Sandra Barneda Valls; 4 October 1975 (age 50); Barcelona, Spain
- Education: Autonomous University of Barcelona
- Occupations: Journalist sometimes, presenter, actress, writer
- Spouse: Pascalle Paerel (m. 2025)
- Partner: Nagore Robles (2016-2022)
- Website: sandrabarneda.com

Sandra Barneda Valls (born 4 October 1975) is a Spanish journalist, television presenter, actress, and writer.

== Biography ==
Sandra Barneda was born in Barcelona on 4 October 1975. She holds a licentiate in journalism from the Autonomous University of Barcelona's Faculty of Information Sciences, and is also a graduate of the Barcelona School of Theater.

She has worked at Catalunya Ràdio, COM Ràdio, RNE4, RTVE Catalunya, Antena 3, Telemadrid, 8TV, TV3, La 2, and Telecinco, as well as writing for El Periódico de Catalunya, Elle and Zero.

In the early 2000s, Barneda began to take some acting roles, joining the cast of the play Aprobado en castidad in 2001, and appearing on television series such as Al salir de clase and Javier ya no vive solo.

On 4 May 2009 she premiered De buena ley on Telecinco, a controversial program which used actors to recreate court cases without advising viewers that they were dramatizations. She presented this with Alberto Herrera, who was replaced by Emilio Pineda on 21 July, when the show's graphics and set were also changed.

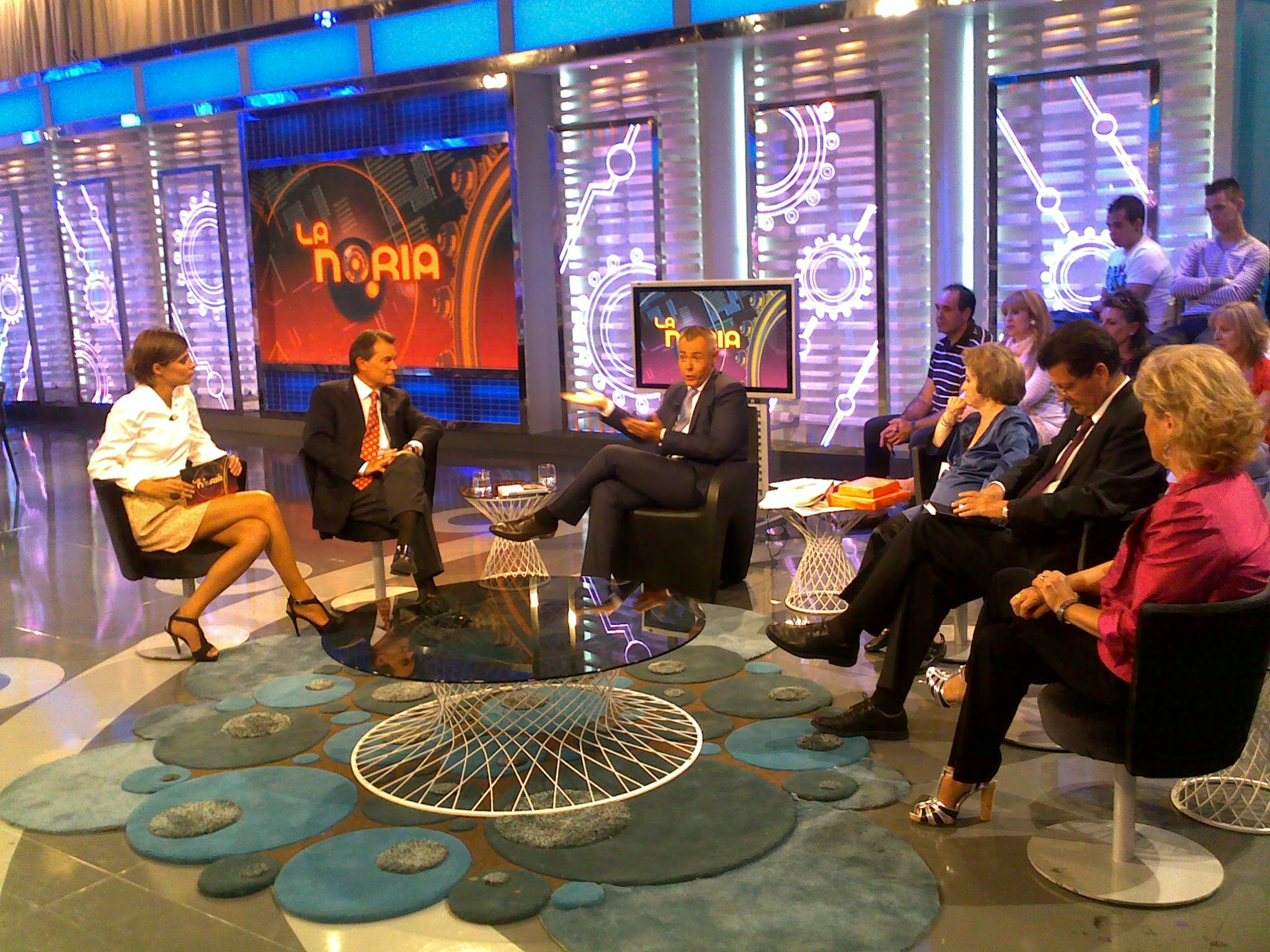
Sandra Barneda (left) on La Noria

On 1 May 2010, Barneda took on the role of presenting issues to be discussed on La Noria, succeeding Glòria Serra.

In early 2012, she became co-presenter of El gran debate, a new show on Saturday night presented by Jordi González, where she remained until its cancellation in August 2013.

On 10 April 2013, she published her first novel, Reír al viento. On 21 December of the same year she released her second book, Cómo construir una superheroína.

In the summers of 2013, 2014, and 2015, she hosted El programa del verano with Joaquín Prat, replacing Ana Rosa Quintana.

From April 2014 to August 2016, she presented the Telecinco evening program Hable con ellas with Alyson Eckmann, Natalia Millán, Beatriz Montañez, Yolanda Ramos, Rocío Carrasco, Marta Torné, Alba Carrillo, Mónica Martínez, and Soledad León de Salazar.

From October 2014 to June 2015, she presented a new Telecinco debate show on Saturday nights, titled Un tiempo nuevo.

On 15 October 2014 her novel La tierra de las mujeres was published.

From September 2015 until March 2016, she presented the sobremesa program Trencadís on 8TV.

In January 2016 she began presenting the Telecinco reality show Gran Hermano VIP on Sunday nights.

From 2016 to 2018, she hosted the Sunday night debate episodes, dubbed Conexión Honduras, on Supervivientes, replacing Raquel Sánchez-Silva. She later returned to the show in 2024.

In 2020, she joined the Cuatro show La isla de las tentaciones to host the debates, and was promoted to host the main show in 2021. In 2025, she gained global recognition shouting "¡Montoya, por favor!" in a viral clip from the show, trying to stop José Carlos Montoya from confronting his girlfriend after watching her sleeping with another contestant.

== Personal life ==
She is openly a lesbian. She previously lived with presenter Tània Sàrrias. On Lesbian Visibility Day in April 2019, she and her then partner Nagore Robles posted pictures of themselves kissing and publicly affirmed their support for LGBT rights. She is currently in a relationship with her new partner, Pascalle Paerel.

== TV programs ==
- Canal Teledeporte (1997–1998), TVE
- L'Informatiu Cap de Setmana (1998–1999), TVE
- Noticias Fin de Semana (1999–2000), Antena 3
- El bus daily summaries (2000), Antena 3
- Telenoticias-2 (2004), Telemadrid
- Diario de la noche (2004–2006), Telemadrid
- Envasat al 8 (2007), 8TV
- Vacances Pagades (2008), TV3
- Fábrica de ideas (2008), La 2
- De buena ley presenter (2009–2014), Telecinco
- La Noria (2010–2012), Telecinco
- Secretos y mentiras presenter (2012), Telecinco
- El gran debate (2012–2013), Telecinco
- El programa del verano (2013–2015), Telecinco
- Hable con ellas (2014–2016), Telecinco
- Un tiempo nuevo (2014–2015), Telecinco
- Trencadís (2015–2016), 8TV
- Survivor: El Debate (2016–2018), Telecinco
- Gran Hermano VIP: El Debate (2016–present), Telecinco
- El otoño fantastico de Telecinco (2017), Telecinco
- Gran Hermano Revolution: Última Hora (2017), Telecinco
- Planeta Calleja (2019), Cuatro
- Viva la vida (2019), Telecinco (Temporal Hosting)
- La isla de las tentaciones (2021-present), Telecinco

== TV series ==
- Al salir de clase (2000) as Begoña, Telecinco
- Compañeros (2001), Antena 3
- Javier ya no vive solo (2002–2003) as psychologist, Telecinco

== Books ==
- Reír al viento (2013), ISBN 9786071127624
- La tierra de las mujeres (2014), ISBN 9788483657751
- Cómo construir una superheroína (2014), ISBN 9788483656389
- Hablarán de nosotras (2016), ISBN 9788403503748
- Las hijas del agua (2018), ISBN 9788491292142
