= Mila Ximénez =

Spanish gossip journalist and TV personality (1952–2021)

- Born: 21 May 1952; Seville, Spain
- Died: 23 June 2021 (aged 69); Madrid, Spain
- Occupation: Journalist
- Spouse: Manuel Santana (m. 1983–1986)
- Children: Alba Santana Ximénez de Cisneros
- Writing career
- Years active: 1984–2021

María de los Milagros Ximénez de Cisneros Rebollo (21 May 1952 – 23 June 2021) was a Spanish journalist, writer, gossip columnist, and television personality.

== Biography and career ==
Ximénez was the daughter of Manuel Ximénez de Cisneros Muñoz de León (1924–2008) and Nicolasa Rebollo Burgueño (1926–2009).

Although she began studying journalism in the University of Seville, she dropped out. At the age of 18 she moved to Madrid, and since February 1986, she collaborated in the newspaper ABC, taking charge of a weekly section called "Café con Mila Santana", where she interviewed: Andrés Segovia, Antonio Mingote, Cayetana de Alba, Leonard Cohen, Plácido Domingo, Terenci Moix, Antonio Asensio, José María García Perez, Miguel Bosé, Pedro Almodóvar, José María Ruiz-Mateos, Carmen Sevilla, Boris Becker, etc. She previously did some collaborations in a tennis magazine and was the owner of the ASPORT video production company, which was dedicated to the recording and sale of cassettes of tennis lessons.

After joining the professional journalist Jaime Peñafiel in the publication La Revista (1984), she worked in a radio show called Directamente Encara conducted by Encarna Sánchez in Cadena COPE.

After a break she took for several years, she returned to her professional activity in the early 2000s, now on television. She joined the staff of collaborators for Telecinco, a channel in which she has worked successively in television programs such as Crónicas marcianas (2004), TNT (2004–2007), A tu lado (2004–2007), La Noria (2007–2012), Tal cual lo contamos (2008) and Sálvame diario and Deluxe (from 2009 and until her death), Abre los ojos y mira (2013–2014), Survivor Spain (2016), Las Campos (2016-2017), Sálvame Okupa (2019), Hormigas blancas (2020), Cantora: la herencia envenenada (2020), Socialité (2020) and La última cena (2020).

In 2016, she began writing a weekly blog in Lecturas magazine. That same year, she joined the cast of Survivor Spain as a contestant, in which she finished as third runner-up. She was also co-host of the campanadas de fin de año in 2017 on Telecinco. In 2019, she participated in the reality show Gran Hermano VIP, where she finished third runner-up. In summer 2020, she also participated in La última cena.

== Legal issues ==
During her television career, Ximénez made statements about the private life of the singer Isabel Pantoja which ended in court on several occasions.

In 2012, Ximénez and two other Sálvame collaborators were convicted of violating the right to honor of Carmen Lomana, who denounced them for some statements they made on the program.

== Personal life and death ==
Ximénez married tennis player Manuel Santana in February 1983, with whom she had a daughter, Alba in 1984. Their marriage ended three years later. At the end of the decade, she had an intimate relationship with actor José Sacristán.

On 16 June 2020, on the program Sálvame she announced that she had been diagnosed with lung cancer the previous week, which was the reason for her absence from television during those days. At the end of March 2021, she was admitted to the Hospital de La Luz in Madrid due to complications of her illness, and was admitted for the second time on 9 June at the same hospital.

Several days later, Ximénez returned to her home in Madrid, where she was sedated while in the company of her relatives. She died on 23 June 2021 at the age of 69. She was cremated the following day in Cementerio de la Almudena, with plans to have her ashes moved to Amsterdam, where her daughter and grandchildren reside.

== TV ==
=== As a collaborator ===
- Crónicas marcianas (2004), Telecinco.
- TNT (2004–2007), Telecinco.
- A tu lado (2004–2007), Telecinco.
- La Noria (2007–2012), Telecinco.
- Tal cual lo contamos (2008), Telecinco.
- Sálvame diario (2009-2021), Telecinco.
- Deluxe (2009-2021), Telecinco.
- Abre los ojos... y mira (2013–2014), Telecinco.
- Pasaporte a la isla (2015), Telecinco.
- Survivor Spain (2015), Telecinco.
- Las Campos (2016-2017), Telecinco.
- Sálvame Okupa (2019), Telecinco.
- Hormigas blancas (2020), Telecinco.
- Cantora: la herencia envenenada (2020), Telecinco.
- Socialité (2020), Telecinco.
- La última cena (2020), Telecinco.

=== As a contestant ===
- Survivor Spain (2016), Telecinco (2nd runner-up).
- Gran Hermano VIP (2019), Telecinco (2nd runner-up).
- La última cena (2020), Telecinco (8th runner-up).

=== As presenter ===
- Las campanadas de fin de año (2017–2018), Telecinco.

== Publications ==
- Perdón si no hablo de mí (2005)
- Gitana, ¿tú me quieres? (2007)
