= Gran Hermano VIP season 2 =

Gran Hermano VIP
- Season 2
- Presented by: Jesús Vázquez
- No. of days: 71
- No. of housemates: 13
- Winner: Ivonne Armant
- Runner-up: Brito Arceo
- No. of episodes: 12

Release
- Original network: Telecinco
- Original release: January 6 – March 17, 2005

Season chronology
- Next → Season 3

Gran Hermano VIP 2 was the second season of the reality television Gran Hermano VIP series which was broadcast in Spain on Telecinco and La Siete and produced by Endemol. The show lasted 71 days from January 6, 2005, to March 17, 2005. Ivonne Armant emerged as the winner.

== Housemates ==
Housemates	Age	Residence	Famous for...	Entered	Exited	Status
Ivonne Armant	30	México D.F.	Actress, Plácido Domingo niece	Day 1	Day 71	Winner
Brito Arceo	41	Tenerife	Football referee	Day 1	Day 71	Runner-up
Tontxu Ipiña	32	Madrid	Singer-songwriter	Day 22	Day 71	3rd Place
Rosario Mohedano	25	Madrid	Singer, Rocío Jurado’s niece	Day 1	Day 67	9th Evicted
Adans Lopez Peres	29	Palma	Acrobat	Day 1	Day 64	8th Evicted
Isabel Pisano	57	Madrid	Writer and journalist	Day 1	Day 57	7th Evicted
Jacqueline Aguilera	28	Caracas	Miss World 1995	Day 1	Day 50	6th Evicted
Lalo Maradona	38	Buenos Aires	Footballer	Day 1	Day 43	5th Evicted
King África	33	Buenos Aires	Singer	Day 1	Day 36	4th Evicted
Martín Pareja-Obregón	40	Huelva	Bullfighter	Day 1	Day 29	3rd Evicted
Adi Villaespesa	39	Málaga	Journalist	Day 1	Day 22	2nd Evicted
Kiko Matamoros	48	Madrid	Talent manager	Day 1	Day 16	Quit
Lara Rodríguez	35	Sevilla	Carmina Ordóñez former secretary	Day 1	Day 15	1st Evicted

== Nominations table ==
Housemates are split into two teams.
Team One: Adans, Isabel, Jacqueline, Kiko, Lalo and Rosario.
Team Two: Adi, Brito, Ivonne, King, Lara, Martin, and later late-arrival Tontxu.

Each Week, when the Housemates Nominate, they must choose one Housemate from each team - with the Housemate from Team One they choose shown in the top of the box and the Housemate they choose from Team Two shown in the bottom of the box, with the three or more Housemates with the most Nomination Points facing the Public Vote.

	Week 1	Week 2	Week 3	Week 4	Week 5	Week 6	Week 7	Week 8	Week 9 Final		
	Week 1	Week 2	Week 3	Week 4	Week 5	Week 6	Week 7	Week 8	Day 67	Day 71	
Ivonne	Kiko, Brito	Kiko, Brito	Adans, Brito	Isabel, Tonxtu	Isabel, Tonxtu	Adans, Tonxtu	Isabel, Tonxtu	Adans, Tonxtu	Brito, Rosario	Winner (Day 71)	
Brito	Jacqueline, Lara	Isabel, Adi	Isabel, Ivonne	Adans, Ivonne	Jacqueline, Tonxtu	Adans, Ivonne	Isabel, Ivonne	Adans, Ivonne	Rosario, Tonxtu	Runner up (Day 71)	
Tonxtu	Not In; House		Exempt	Adans, King	Jacqueline, Rosario	Adans, Rosario	Adans, Rosario	Adans, Brito	Brito, Ivonne	Third place (Day 71)	
Rosario	Jacqueline, Lara	Kiko, Adi	Lalo, Ivonne	Adans, Brito	Lalo, Tonxtu	Jacqueline, Tonxtu	Adans, Tonxtu	Adans, Tonxtu	Ivonne, Tonxtu	Evicted (Day 67)	
Adans	Kiko, Lara	Kiko, Adi	Rosario, Martín	Lalo, Ivonne	Isabel, Brito	Isabel, Ivonne	Isabel, Ivonne	Rosario, Tonxtu	Evicted (Day 64)		
Isabel	Lalo, Lara	Kiko, Adi	Lalo, Martín	Adans, Brito	Lalo, Ivonne	Jacqueline, Tonxtu	Brito, Rosario	Evicted (Day 57)			
Jacqueline	Rosario, Lara	Kiko, Martín	Rosario, Ivonne	Adans, King	Adans, Brito	Adans, Tonxtu	Evicted (Day 50)				
Lalo	Isabel, Lara	Kiko, Martín	Rosario, Martín	Adans, Tonxtu	Jacqueline, Tonxtu	Evicted (Day 43)					
King	Kiko, Lara	Kiko, Adi	Jacqueline, Brito	Isabel, Tonxtu	Evicted (Day 36)						
Martín	Kiko, Brito	Kiko, Brito	Adans, Brito	Evicted (Day 29)							
Adi	Rosario, Brito	Kiko, Brito	Evicted (Day 22)								
Kiko	Adans, Lara	Adans, Adi	Walked (Day 16)								
Lara	Kiko, Brito	Evicted (Day 15)									
Notes	^{1}	^{2}	^{3}	none	^{4}	^{5}	none				
Nominated For Eviction	Jacqueline, Kiko, Lara, Rosario	Adi, Brito, ~~Kiko,~~; Martín	Ivonne, Martín, Rosario	Adans, Brito, Isabel, Ivonne, King, Tonxtu	Brito, Isabel, Jacqueline, Lalo, Tonxtu	Adans, Ivonne, Jacqueline, Tonxtu	Adans, Isabel, Ivonne, Rosario, Tonxtu	Adans, Brito, Ivonne, Rosario, Tonxtu	Brito, Ivonne, Rosario, Tonxtu	Brito, Ivonne, Tonxtu	
Walked	none	Kiko	none								
Evicted	Lara; 57% to evict	Adi; 74.8% to evict	Martín; 61.7% to evict	King; 43.5% to evict	Lalo; 43.1% to evict	Jacqueline; 69.9% to evict	Isabel; 62.9% to evict	Adans; 36.9% to evict	Rosario; 42.9% to evict	Tonxtu; 18% to win	Brito; 20% to win
Evicted	Lara; 57% to evict	Adi; 74.8% to evict	Martín; 61.7% to evict	King; 43.5% to evict	Lalo; 43.1% to evict	Jacqueline; 69.9% to evict	Isabel; 62.9% to evict	Adans; 36.9% to evict	Rosario; 42.9% to evict	Ivonne; 62% to win	

=== Notes ===
Each Week the team captains have the chance to save one Housemate from the line-up, provided they agree.
^1 Brito was initially Nominated but was saved by the team captains, being replaced by Jacqueline and Rosario.
^2 Adi, Brito and Kiko were originally Nominated for Eviction (with the team captains choosing to save no-one) but after Kiko Walked from the House he was replaced in the Nomination line-up by Martín.
^3 Brito, Ivonne, Martin and Rosario were originally Nominated, but Brito was saved by the team captains.
^4 This Week Rosario switched from Team 1 to Team 2, in order to even out the disproportionate numbers.
^5 From this Week on the teams were kept - but Housemates could now Nominate whoever they wanted (as opposed to one from each team). The team captains chose to save no-one this Week and so the Nominations stayed the same.

== See also ==
- Main Article about the show
