= Marta Flich =

Spanish comedian and TV host

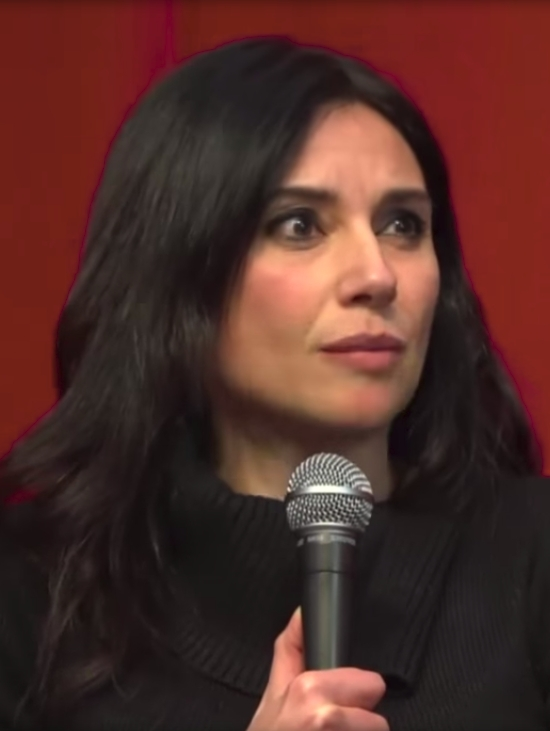
- Born: 21 July 1978 (age 48); Valencia, Spain
- Education: University of Valencia; University of Delaware
- Occupations: Economist, actress, TV host

Marta Flich (born 1978 in Valencia) is a Spanish economist, comedian and TV host.

== Biography ==
She was born in Valencia, but has lived most of her life in La Vall d'Uixó. When she was seven years old, she began to study piano and singing in the Conservatory of Music. She graduated in Economy by the University of Valencia and has a master in International Trade by the University of Delaware. She has worked in banking, a profession that she combined with her training in acting. In addition to working as an actress, she has also worked as a television presenter.

From 2016 she published a video blog in the Huffington Post where she explains the economic news in a simple and sarcastic way.

Since 2018, she has been a collaborator on the radio program Por fin no es lunes on Onda Cero. That same year, she began hosting the television comedy show Ese programa del que usted me habla on La 2.

In 2019, she joined the cast of Todo es mentira as a permanent collaborator. The show, hosted by Risto Mejide on Cuatro, also features her as an occasional substitute presenter. Additionally, she co-hosted the investigative program Todo es verdad alongside Mejide.

In 2023, she was announced as the main host for the weekly live galas of Gran Hermano VIP, coinciding with the return of the reality television show to Spanish television.

== Television ==
Year	Series	Channel
2007	Cuestión de sexo	Cuatro
2007	Escenas de matrimonio	Telecinco
2007	Lalola	Antena 3
2008	HKM	Cuatro
2010	Impares Premium	Neox
2011	Solo comedia	Web series
2017	Mad in Spain	Telecinco
2018	Roast Battle	Comedy Central Spain
2019-	Todo es mentira	Cuatro
2023	Gran Hermano VIP	Telecinco
2024	Naked Attraction	Max

== Cinema ==
Year	Film	Director
2014	Vampyres	Víctor Matellano
2013	Días de lluvia	Eneas Martínez
2013	Omnívoros	Óscar Rojo
2012	2x0 (Cortometraje)	With Román Reyes
2010	La curva de la felicidad	Luis Sola

== Theatre ==
Actress

Year	Play
2013	5 mujeres que comen tortilla
2013	Efecto dominó
2012	Sé infiel y no mires con quién

Director

Year	Play
2008	La boda del Zinc
2000	Triple A
