= Alba Carrillo =

Spanish model (born 1986)

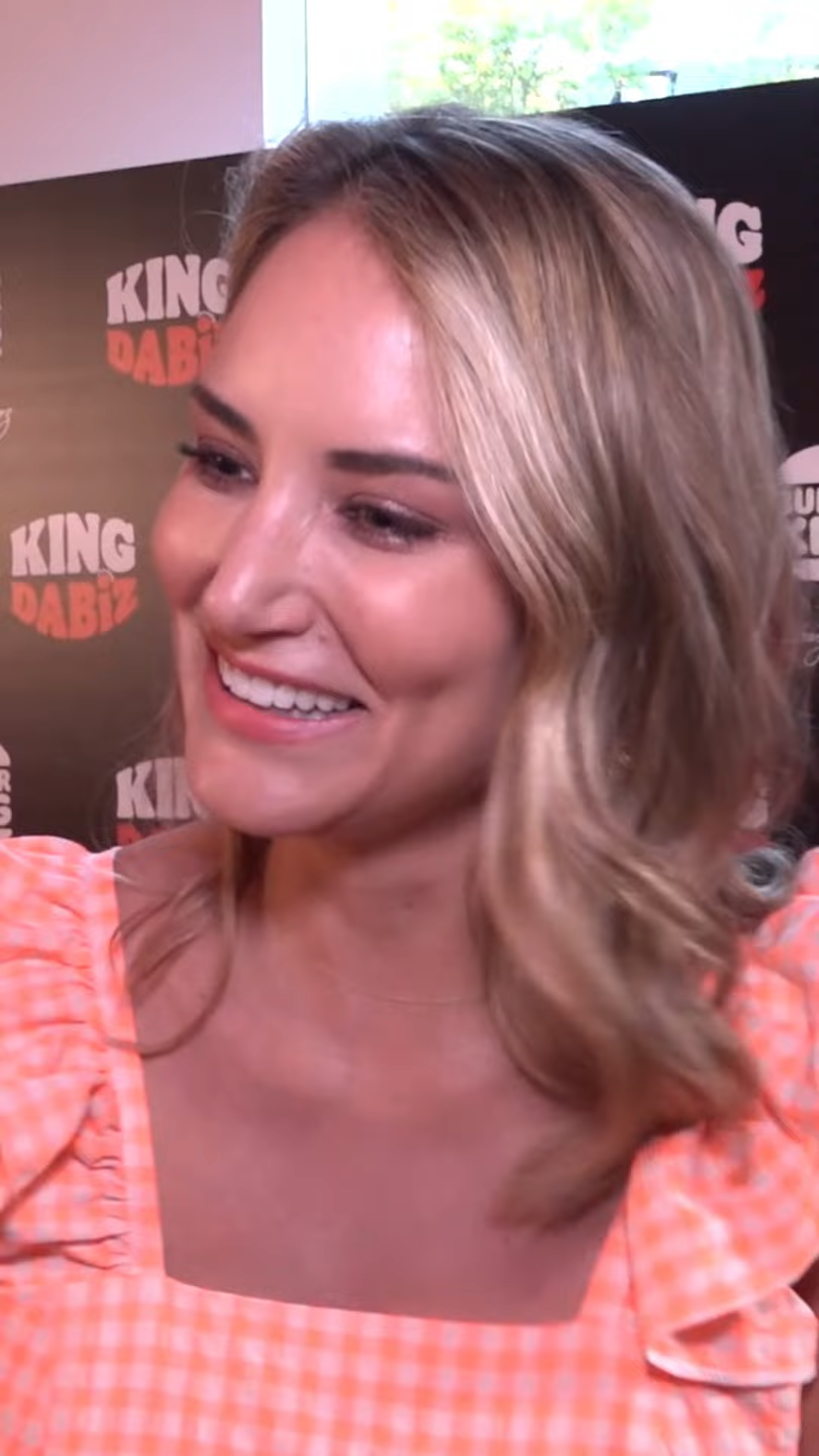
- Born: Lucía del Alba Carrillo Pariente; 31 July 1986 (age 40); Madrid, Spain
- Occupations: Television personality, model and influencer
- Years active: 2007-present

Lucía del Alba Carrillo Pariente (Madrid, July 31, 1986), better known as Alba Carrillo, is a Spanish model and television presenter, best known for her participation in the Supermodelo program in 2007. Her participation in the contest led her to be the image of Novissima, Eleonora Amadei, and Evelyny Marcelino, as well as for other brands such as Rosa Clará, Brownie, and Triumph. Subsequently, she signed with Mediaset España, where she became a presenter, collaborator, and participant in various television formats.

== Biography ==
=== First years ===
Born in Madrid, where she lived and grew up with her parents, Carlos Carrillo and Lucía Pariente, Alba Carrillo studied Advertising and Public Relations at the Complutense University of Madrid, a career that she combined with courses in Dramatic Art. In the middle of this stage, she decided to apply for the television contest Supermodelo, broadcast on Cuatro and finished the course.

=== Professional career ===
After her exit from the contest, she became the image of brands such as Novissima, Eleonora Amadei, and Evelyny Marcelino. Over the years, other important brands, such as Rosa Clará or Triumph, have worked with her as a model. After several years away from the television spotlight, she returned as the presenter of Glamour TV, directed by Ana García Siñeriz and broadcast on Nova. Two years later, she returned to the small screen as a contributor to Amigas y conocidas, the morning show on TVE.

In the summer of 2016, she presented, together with Rocío Carrasco, Sandra Barneda, Mónica Martínez and Soledad León de Salazar, the new season of Hable con ellas on Telecinco. After her time on the Mediaset España program, the model signed with the company to collaborate in spaces such as Sábado Deluxe, Sálvame, Viva la vida or Mujeres y hombres y viceversa. She has also participated in the reality show Supervivientes 2017 with her mother, where she finished in second place.

She has also participated in the competitions Ven a cenar conmigo: Gourmet Edition and Mi madre cocina mejor que la tuya, in addition to collaborating in Ya es mediodía, presented by Sonsoles Ónega. In September 2018, she makes her GH VIP debut and returns to the Emma García hosted program Viva la vida. On the occasion of the start of the new edition of Supervivientes, she begins to collaborate in the program Cuatro al día in 2019.

In terms of other projects, the model maintained a blog in Telva magazine for several years, where she commented on fashion and discussed various celebrities. On the other hand, she also launched her own clothing brand called "Coco y Cocoilo," designed for mothers and children. Later, she enrolled in Criminology, and in February 2019, she started studying at the University of Madrid.

In September 2019, she began her participation in GH VIP 7, where she qualified as second finalist. After collaborating in the program Ya es mediodía, she returned as a tertuliana to the program Sálvame in September 2021, though she would eventually leave the program two months later.

== Private life ==
Alba Carrillo began a relationship with ex-racer Fonsi Nieto in 2010, with whom she had a son, Lucas González Carrillo, on October 17, 2011. The relationship between the model and the ex-racer ended in 2012.

A year later, the presenter began a relationship with tennis player Feliciano López. After two years of dating, they decided to get married in 2015. However, in early 2016, the couple ended their relationship. The divorce was finalized in 2018.

Carrillo was romantically linked to engineer David Vallespín and footballer Thibaut Courtois between 2018 and 2019.

From 2019 to 2021, she maintained a relationship with journalist Santi Burgoa.

== Filmography ==
=== Television programs ===
As a presenter

Year	Title	Channel	Role
2012	Glamour TV	Nova	Presenter
2016	Hable con ellas	Telecinco	Presenter
2017 - 2018	Las Pelotas de Alba	Telecinco	Presenter
2017	Sálvame	Telecinco	Substitute presenter
2021	Ya es mediodía	Telecinco	Substitute presenter

As a collaborator

Year	Title	Channel	Role
2013	El Almacén de Top Chef	Antena 3	Collaborator
2014	Amigas y conocidas	TVE	Collaborator
2016	Gran Hermano: El Debate	Telecinco	Collaborator
2016 - 2017	¡Qué tiempo tan feliz!	Telecinco	Collaborator
2017 - 2018; 2021	Sálvame	Telecinco	Collaborator
2017; 2021	Sábado Deluxe	Telecinco	Collaborator
2017 - 2018	Supervivientes: El Debate	Telecinco	Collaborator
2018	Corazón	TVE	Collaborator
2018	Mujeres y hombres y viceversa	Cuatro	Opinionist
2018 - Present	Ya es mediodía	Telecinco	Collaborator
2018	Gran Hermano VIP: El Debate	Telecinco	Collaborator
2020	Viva la vida	Telecinco	Collaborator
2020	A propósito de Supervivientes	Telecinco	Collaborator
2020	La casa fuerte	Telecinco	Collaborator
2020	Lazos de sangre	TVE	Guest Collaborator
2021	El debate de las tentaciones	Telecinco	Collaborator
2021	Rocío, contar la verdad para seguir viva	Telecinco	Collaborator
2021	Secret Story: La casa de los secretos	Telecinco	Collaborator
2021- Present	Ya son las ocho	Telecinco	Collaborator

As a guest

Year	Title	Channel	Role
2018	Viajando con Chester	Cuatro	Guest
2019	Cuatro al día	Cuatro	Guest Collaborator
2019	Land Rober	TVG	Guest
2020	Typical Spanish	TVE	Guest contestant
2021	A simple vista	Cuatro	Godmother
2021	Sobreviviré	Mitele Plus	Guest
2022	Mi casa es la tuya	Telecinco	Guest

As a participant

Year	Title	Channel	Role
2007	Supermodelo	Cuatro	Contestant - 4th place
2017	Supervivientes	Telecinco	Contestant - 2nd finalist
2017 - 2018	Sálvame Stars	Telecinco	Participant
2018	Ven a cenar conmigo: Gourmet edition	Cuatro	Participant - 3rd place
2018	Mi madre cocina mejor que la tuya	Telecinco	Participant - Winner
2019	Gran Hermano VIP 7	Telecinco	Contestant - 2nd finalist
2020 - 2021	Los Gipsy Kings	Cuatro	Participant
2021	La última cena 2	Telecinco	Contestant - 6th place
2022	Masterchef Celebrity 7	TVE	Contestant- 2nd Finalist

=== Television series ===
Year	Title	Channel	Role	Notes
2009	Sin tetas no hay paraíso	Telecinco	Model	Episode: «El mismo perro»
