= Kiko Matamoros =

Spanish television personality

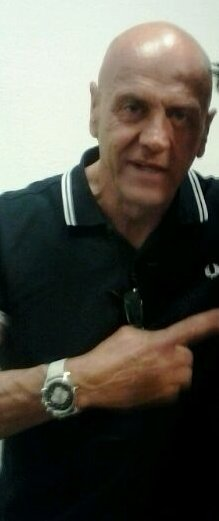
- Matamoros in 2018.
- Born: Juan Francisco Matamoros Hernández; December 27, 1956 (age 69); Madrid, Spain
- Years active: 2002-present
- Known for: Television personality
- Television: Crónicas marcianas (1999); Sálvame (2010–17, 2019–2023); Viva la vida (2017–22)
- Spouse(s): Marian Flores (m. 1984; div. 1998) Makoke (m. 2016; div. 2019)
- Partner(s): Makoke (1999–2016); Cristina Pujol (2018–19); Marta López Álamo (2019–present)
- Website: kiko-matamoros.es

Juan Francisco "Kiko" Matamoros Hernández (born 27 December 1956) is a Spanish television personality.

== Early life ==
The son of Manuel Matamoros Ripoll and Enriqueta Hernández Martín, Matamoros was born into a middle-class family. For a year, he studied law at the Complutense University of Madrid.

A little later, Matamoros started a career as a model and met Marián Flores, who would later become his first wife. Marián was one of the models on the game show Un, dos, tres... responda otra vez: little by little, Flores left showbiz and lived a quieter life with Matamoros. Whilst married to Marián, Kiko started to work as an agent for artists, including his brother-in-law Mar Flores. He and Marián split in an amicable divorce, but he broke off all communication with her family.

Kiko started a new relationship with Makoke, and restarted his career as an agent. He was the agent of socialite Carmen Ordóñez until her death in 2004: she became one of his best friends. This friendship helped him to rise to fame.

In 1999, he had his first TV appearance as 'Juan Matamoros' on Crónicas marcianas, on which his younger brother Coto worked. In 2002, he worked on the chat show Salsa Rosa on Telecinco. In 2005, he took part in the second series of Gran Hermano VIP: he withdrew after two weeks.

After this Matamoros started to work on other Telecinco programmes including Sálvame, A tu lado, La Noria and Resistiré, ¿vale?. He also started an acting career on the Telecinco drama Esposados. He also had a small part in the film Torrente 4: Lethal Crisis. In 2017 and 2018 he appeared as one of the country's worst debt defaulters, surmounting to €1,016,643 in 2018.

In 2022, Matamoros was confirmed as a contestant on Supervivientes: Perdidos en Honduras. He finished 8th, voted out on the 73rd day.

== Personal life ==
Matamoros had four children with Marián Flores: Lucía (1985), Diego (1986), Laura (1993) and Irene (1998). He has one niece and one nephew: Matías Matamoros (2018) and Benjamín Matamoros (2021), children of his sister Laura.

He also had a daughter with Makoke: Ana (2000).

Kiko's younger brother is media personality Coto Matamoros, with whom he worked on Crónicas marcianas. His cousin was the writer Almudena Grandes, until her death in 2021.
