= Pipi Estrada =

Spanish sports journalist and TV panelist

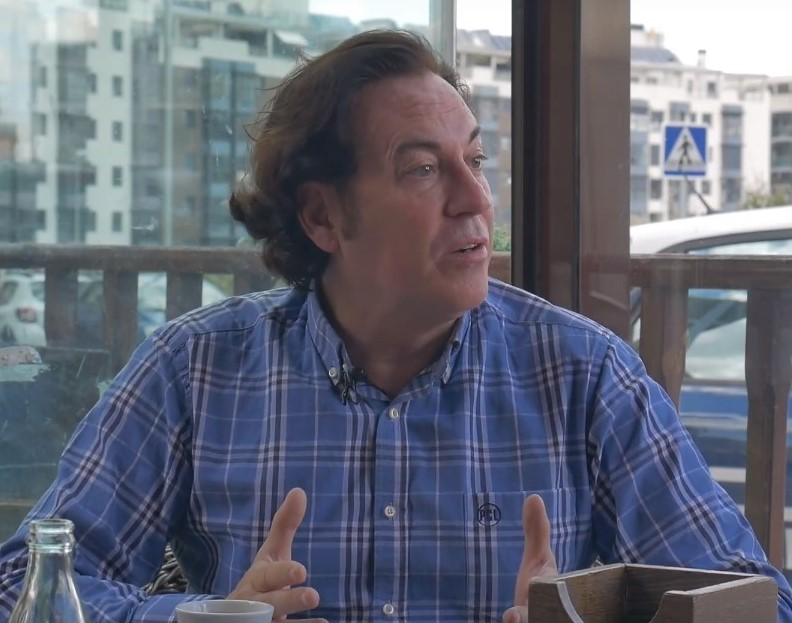
- Estrada in 2019
- Born: José Manuel Estrada Calzada; 12 March 1957 (age 69); Gijón, Asturias, Spain
- Occupations: Journalist, television personality
- Years active: 1983–present
- Employer(s): Atresmedia; COPE; Mediaset España

José Manuel Estrada Calzada (born 12 March 1957), better known as Pipi Estrada, is a well-known Spanish sports journalist.

== Biography ==
His father worked at ENSIDESA, a Spanish steel producer. In his native Gijón, in Asturias, he knew Gaspar Rosety, a journalist who would become a great figure in his career path. He was the one who also gave Estrada the nickname "Pipi", in honour of the children's book character Pippi Longstocking.

Estrada moved to Madrid so his father could study industrial engineering and during his time in the capital, he combined his studies with working as a DJ. In 1975, he arrived at the Cerebro nightclub, an icon of La Movida Madrileña, at the end of the Calle de la Princesa and one of the in-fashion clubs in Madrid. After, he worked at the Piñas Club on the Avenida de Alberto Alcocer until he finished his university studies.

His father died when Estrada was 23 years old and this was when he first started to have a presence on the airwaves, on the broadcaster Radio 80. Rosety gave him a slot with the presenter José Maríá García on Antena 3 Radio; he worked with García from 1983 until 1994. It was around this time that he got to know the presenter Terelu Campos, with whom he later start a relationship and become a regular on chat shows and the like.

After Antena 3 Radio, in 2004 he joined COPE, where he was the presenter and director of El banquillo on Onda 6. In 2005, he joined Punto Radio for the programme El mirador del deporte ("The Sports Watcher"), with Josep Pedrerol and Joaquín Ramos Marcos. In 2009, he joined chat show Sálvame on Telecinco, but left after an argument with Jimmy Giménez-Arnau.

Between 2011 and 2016, he worked as a sports commentator for EsRadio, becoming in charge of Real Madrid broadcasts. He also became a consejero de amor ("love advisor") on the Telecinco dating show Mujeres y hombres y viceversa between 2009 and 2013, whilst also dabbling in other programmes on that network. He also worked on the programme El chiringuito de Jugones between 2014 and 2022, broadcast on Mega. In 2022, he returned to Sálvame, and also participated on the reality show Pesadilla en El Paraíso, the Spanish version of the Swedish format Farmen.

As El Chiringuito talk show hosts Edu Aguirre and Pipi Estrada were accused on social networks of bringing drugs to the set of the program, consuming illegal substances during the broadcast or appearing on the program under the effects of narcotic substances when during the live broadcast of the program they were seen to drop papers from their pockets to the floor of the television set. Both journalists denied these accusations, answering that they were tissues.

== Broadcasting ==
Year	Title	Channel	Role
2004	El banquillo	Onda 6	Presenter
2006	Supervivientes	Telecinco	Spanish version of Survivor: 5th voted off
2006-07	A tu lado	Telecinco	
2006	En Antena	Antena 3	
2009	Sálvame	Telecinco	
2009-11	El Marcador	Veo7	
2009-13	Mujeres y hombres y viceversa	Telecinco	
2010	Enemigos íntimos	Telecinco	
2010	Futboleros	MARCA TV	
2011	De buena ley	Telecinco	
2011	Tiramillas	MARCA TV	
2011-13	Punto pelota	Intereconomía	
2014-22	El chiringuito de Jugones	LaSexta	
2015-17	Espejo público	Antena 3	
2022	Deluxe	Telecinco	
2022	Sálvame Mediafest	Telecinco	
2022	Pesadilla en El Paraíso	Telecinco	Spanish version of The Farm: 1st voted off
2022	¿Quién es mi padre?	Telecinco	
