= Glòria Serra =

Spanish journalist and television presenter (born 1964)

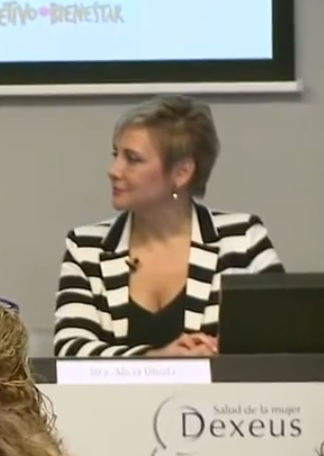
- Serra in 2020
- Born: Maria Glòria Serra Ramos; 21 October 1964 (age 61); Barcelona, Spain
- Education: Autonomous University of Barcelona (BA in Journalism)
- Occupations: Journalist; Television presenter
- Years active: 1987–present
- Employer(s): La Sexta, RAC1, La Vanguardia
- Spouse: Nacho (m. 2010)
- Children: 2

Maria Glòria Serra Ramos (born 21 October 1964) is a Spanish journalist and television presenter. She is best known as the host of the investigative journalism program Equipo de investigación on La Sexta, which she has presented since 2011. Serra has worked in Spanish media for over 35 years, beginning her career in radio before transitioning to television. In 2024, she and her program received the prestigious Antena de Oro award for their contribution to investigative journalism.

== Early life and education ==
Serra was born in Barcelona, Catalonia, Spain, to a family with two daughters. She graduated with a degree in Journalism from the Autonomous University of Barcelona, where she developed her interest in investigative reporting and broadcast media.

== Career ==
=== Radio career (1987–1998) ===
Serra began her media career in 1987 working in radio. She started at Radio Barcelona, part of the Cadena SER network, where she worked on local afternoon news programs and the national program Hora 25. She also served as editor of Matinal SER-Catalunya and director of El Balcó. During this period, she collaborated with prominent journalist Julia Otero on the program ¿Y nosotras qué? on Ràdio Miramar and presented Catalunya matí on Catalunya Ràdio.

=== Television career (1998–present) ===
==== Telecinco period (1998–2001) ====
Serra transitioned to television in 1998 when she joined Telecinco. She worked as sub-editor and presenter of the first edition of Informativos Telecinco, while simultaneously directing and presenting the current affairs program La mirada crítica. Her work during this period established her reputation as a serious journalist capable of handling both news presentation and in-depth analysis.

==== TV3 and local television (1999–2007) ====
Parallel to her work at Telecinco, between 1999 and 2001, Serra co-presented the debate program L'aventura quotidiana on TV3 alongside Josep Cuní. She later directed the debate show Coses que pasen and collaborated on the magazine program Els matins, both presented by Cuní on the Catalan public broadcaster.

In 2001, Serra took charge of the debate program Ciutat oberta on Barcelona TV, which became one of the most successful programs on Barcelona's local television, achieving significant audience ratings.

Between July and August 2003, she briefly returned to radio to present the summer morning magazine La segona república on COMRàdio. Two years later, in September 2005, she returned to the station to replace Joan Barril during the regular season, hosting the morning magazine Matins.com for two seasons.

==== Return to Telecinco and La Noria (2007–2010) ====
After leaving COMRàdio, Serra returned to Telecinco where, from 25 August 2007 to 24 April 2010, she co-presented the popular program La Noria alongside Jordi González. She served as narrator between segments, and the program achieved great popularity, making Serra a household name in Spanish television.

==== Antena 3 and Equipo de investigación (2010–present) ====
From 1 May 2010 to 4 March 2011, Serra presented the afternoon magazine show 3D on Antena 3. However, her most significant career achievement came on 31 January 2011, when she began directing and presenting Equipo de investigación, an investigative journalism program that moved to La Sexta and has become one of Spain's most respected current affairs shows.

Under Serra's leadership, Equipo de investigación has produced over 500 episodes as of October 2024, covering major investigations including corporate scandals, social issues, and criminal cases. The program is known for its rigorous fact-checking and comprehensive research, with a team of 57 professionals working on approximately 40 investigative reports per year. Serra's distinctive narrative style and the program's commitment to giving victims a central role in their stories has distinguished it from other investigative formats.

The program has tackled high-profile cases including investigations into palm oil labeling that led to industry-wide changes, exposures of online exploitation platforms, and coverage of major criminal cases. Serra has stated that the program's motto is "the victim is the center of the story," differentiating their approach from sensationalist true crime formats.

=== Other activities ===
Since 2009, Serra has participated as a regular contributor to the radio program El Món a RAC1 on RAC1. She also writes columns for the newspaper La Vanguardia. In 2024, she participated in the television competition Mask Singer: adivina quién canta on Antena 3, performing under the mask "Piña" (Pineapple).

In October 2024, coinciding with the 500th episode milestone of Equipo de investigación, Serra launched a podcast on Onda Cero, expanding her media presence across multiple platforms.

== Personal life ==
Serra has been in a relationship with Nacho, an Argentine decorator who is 20 years her junior, since the 2010s. The couple maintains a private lifestyle in Barcelona. In September 2014, at the age of 50, Serra gave birth to twin daughters. She has spoken about how motherhood has made her "more fierce" and "more of a fighter," particularly regarding the world she wants to leave for future generations.

Serra has been open about experiencing anxiety in her early career, specifically at age 28, which she credits with helping her develop better coping mechanisms for the rest of her life. She has also discussed her significant weight loss journey, during which she lost 20 kilograms over 18 months with the help of nutritionist Montse Folch, going from size 46 to size 38.

== Awards and recognition ==
In 2024, Serra and Equipo de investigación received the Antena de Oro award from the Federation of Radio and Television Associations of Spain (FARTVE), recognizing their outstanding contribution to investigative journalism. The award was presented at the 51st edition of the ceremony held at the Casino de Aranjuez in November 2024.
