= Telepasión Española =

Spanish Christmas Eve television special

- Also known as: Telepasión
- Genre: Christmas special Musical television series
- Created by: Javier Caballé; Óscar Gómez; Jordi García Candau
- Country of origin: Spain
- Original language: Spanish
- No. of episodes: 28

Production
- Production companies: Televisión Española (1990–2006); Radiotelevisión Española (2014–present)

Original release
- Network: La 1
- Release: 31 December 1990 – present

Related
- Radiopasión Española

Telepasión Española, usually shortened to Telepasión, is a Spanish Christmas Eve television musical special aired on La 1 of Televisión Española for 28 editions since 1990. It features many of the presenters of the shows and the actors from the series of the network performing well-known songs in elaborate choreographed musical numbers.

== Background ==
Telepasión Española was created by Javier Caballé, Óscar Gómez, and Jordi García Candau. The first episode was broadcast on 31 December 1990 and has aired every year since then with the exception of 2005 and 2007–2013. Except for the first two editions broadcast on New Year's Eve, the show is broadcast on Christmas Eve following the King's Christmas Message on La 1 of Televisión Española (TVE). It has been the most watched show in its time slot constantly and together with the other special programs broadcast that night on La 1, make the channel the most watched in Spain consecutively on Christmas Eve.

Each edition focuses on a theme, and has a main comedic storyline starring the hosts, interspersed with elaborate choreographed musical numbers performed by many of the presenters of the shows and the actors from the series of all TVE channels. Presenters from Radio Nacional de España (RNE) also perform, and technicians and other staff from both networks appear uncredited in some of the numbers, waving from their workstations or dancing in the background. The RTVE Symphony Orchestra and Choir participate occasionally. The show usually ends with a large group musical number after which the hosts wish the audience a Merry Christmas on behalf of all the employees of Radiotelevisión Española (RTVE).

The presenters and actors sing well-known songs in their own voices, lip-syncing to pre-recorded tracks. The lyrics of the songs are usually adapted to the theme or given a Christmas touch. The elaborate musical numbers are staged either on purpose-built sets in a studio, on the actual sets of the shows or series themselves, on other locations in and around RTVE production centers, or on real indoor and outdoor locations around the country. The actors from the fiction series appear as themselves in current clothing, or as their characters in costume. The 2025 edition features the participation of more than 130 credited presenters and actors, including for the first time the anchors of the seventeen regional newscasts of TVE.

Telepasión Española has undergone a profound critical and technical evolution divided into three periods. Its first two editions achieved unanimous acclaim thanks to a groundbreaking and clever meta-television parody that revealed the network's backstage, and the cultural impact of showing the most serious news anchors singing or in a relatable register. However, starting with its third edition in 1992 and continuing through 2006, the format entered a sharp decline due to a loss of novelty, repetitive scripts, clumsier humor, outdated musical repertoires, and poor staging. After an eight year-long cancellation, since its return in 2014 there has been a progressive redemption and dignification of the show, according to critics: the musical repertoire was modernized, complex high-quality choreography and camera direction were introduced, and the staging was decentralized by opting for meticulously chosen real locations. Critics have also highlighted that, although the historical vocal imbalance between the performers persists because most are not professional singers, these flaws have been significantly mitigated by advanced audio post-production tools like autotune, consolidating the modern special into a highly dignified holiday show that serves as RTVE's traditional Christmas greeting.

Since 2007, the show has had a counterpart on RNE titled Radiopasión Española, or simply Radiopasión, where the radio presenters also sing well-known songs.

== Episodes ==
No.	Title	Host(s)	Original release date	Spain viewers (millions)	Share
1	"Telepasión Española"	Julia Otero	31 December 1990	N/A	TBA
2	"Telepasión"	Elena Sánchez Caballero, Joaquín Prat, and Constantino Romero	31 December 1991	N/A	TBA
3	"Telepasión Española y olé"	Elisa Matilla and Paco Valladares	24 December 1992	5 892	44.9%
4	"Telepasión Española, ¡oh yeah!"	None	24 December 1993	4 382	28.6%
5	"No hay Navidad sin Telepasión"	Ángeles Martín	24 December 1994	4 389	37.7%
6	"Una noche en el Roxy"	None	24 December 1995	3 544	30.9%
7	"Recordando a Disney"	Ramón García	24 December 1996	2 782	27.3%
8	"Telepasión por bailar"	None	24 December 1997	3 960	26.2%
9	"El programa del siglo"	None	24 December 1998	2 917	27.0%
10	"La gala 10"	Carlos Lozano and Paloma Lago	24 December 1999	4 148	37.2%
11	"La magia de la televisión"	Carlos Lozano and Paloma Lago	24 December 2000	4 364	40.0%
12	"Sigue la magia"	Carlos Lozano and Paloma Lago	24 December 2001	4 286	39.7%
13	"Telepasión 13"	Ramón García	24 December 2002	2 986	29.7%
14	"Supertelepasión"	Ramón García	24 December 2003	2 365	24.0%
15	"¡Cuánto tiempo!"	José Antonio Maldonado and Paco Montesdeoca	24 December 2004	1 698	19.3%
16	"Pasión por la tele"	Anne Igartiburu	24 December 2006	2 807	26.2%
17	"Parte de tu vida"	Ramón García	24 December 2014	1 811	17.4%
18	"Un viaje en el tiempo"	Teté Delgado, Enrique Villén, Elena Furiase, Juan Muñoz, and Carmen Santa María	24 December 2015	1 901	19.3%
19	"Va de cine"	Roberto Leal and Berta Collado	24 December 2016	1 856	19.2%
20	"El musical"	Anne Igartiburu and Santiago Segura	24 December 2017	1 582	17.3%
21	"La gran cena"	Elena S. Sánchez and Juanma Cifuentes	24 December 2018	1 582	17.3%
22	"Una noche de tormenta"	Miriam Díaz-Aroca and Roberto Leal	24 December 2019	2 427	20.9%
23	"El gran guateque"	Alaska, La Terremoto de Alcorcón, and Florentino Fernández	24 December 2020	3 144	21.0%
24	"Telepasión Airlines. Vuelo 2021"	Ana Obregón and Boris Izaguirre	24 December 2021	2 290	18.6%
25	"Se armó en Telepasión"	Ana Obregón and Mario Vaquerizo	24 December 2022	1 978	19.4%
26	"Nadie es perfecto"	Patricia Conde, Rodrigo Vázquez, and Aitor Albizua	24 December 2023	1 957	20.9%
27	"La gran mentira"	Patricia Conde and Aitor Albizua	24 December 2024	2 118	22.8%
28	"Mi gran noche"	Aitor Albizua and Lalachus	24 December 2025	2 099	23.6%
