= Ylenia =

Ylenia is a female given name, and is the first name of:

- Ylenia Carrisi (b. 1970), Italian TV celebrity
- Ylenia Lenhard (b. 2002), Swiss murder victim
- Ylenia Scapin (b. 1975), Italian judoka
