= Carolina Ferre =

Spanish television presenter

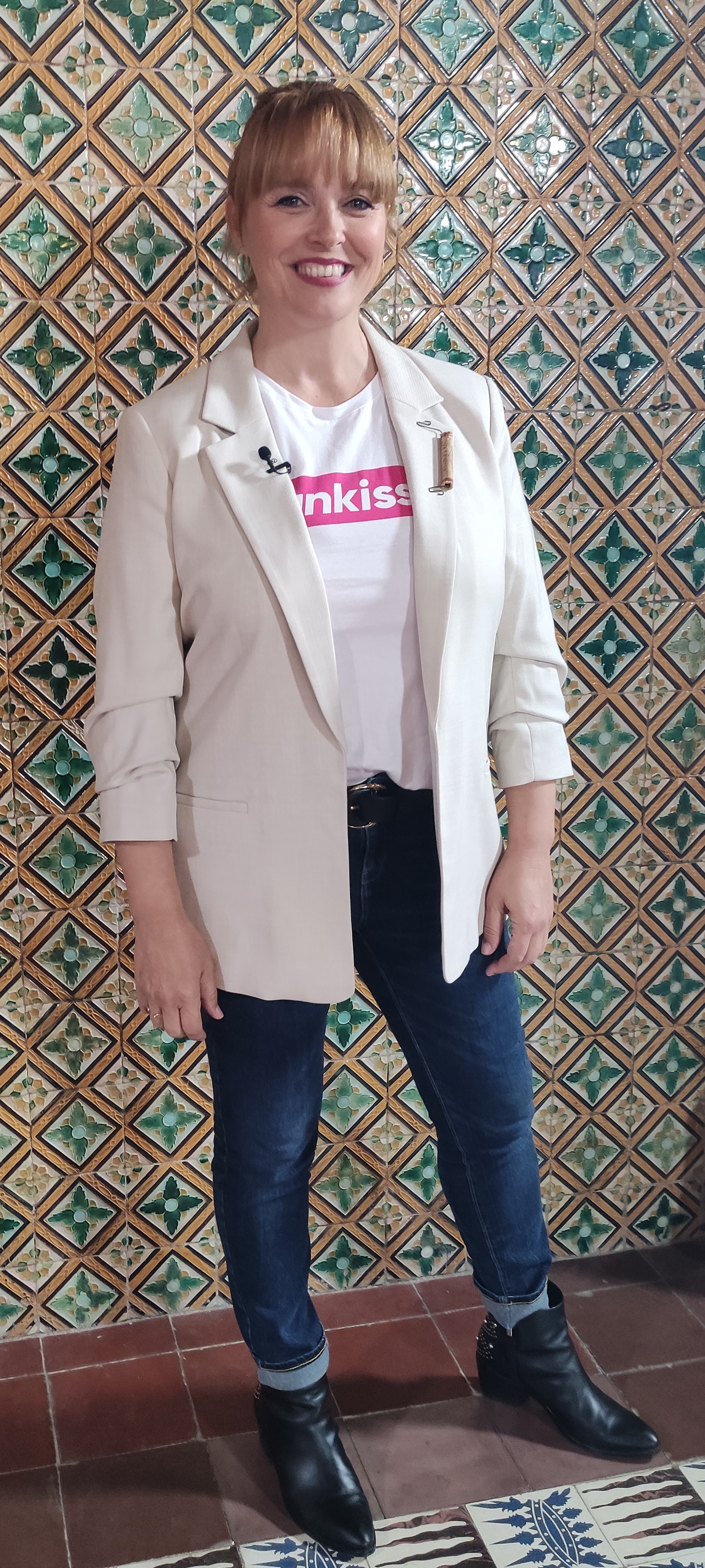
- Carolina Ferre in 2021
- Born: Carolina Ferre Amat; 27 August 1974 (age 51); Cocentaina, Alicante, Spain
- Occupations: Journalist and Television presenter

Carolina Ferre Amat (born in Cocentaina, Alicante, Spain on 27 August 1974) is a Spanish journalist who has developed her career mainly in television.

== Biography ==
She began her career on the Valencian regional channel Canal 9, with programs such a Guanye qui guanye or Tela marinera. In 1999, she made the leap to national television when she was signed by the private channel Telecinco, where she presented the variety show Fiebre del domingo noche, along with Juan y Medio and Carlos Tena.

Later, in 2003, she temporarily replaced Emma García in charge of A tu lado and collaborated with Mercedes Milá in that year's edition of Gran Hermano, in charge of the summaries. The popularity she acquired earned her the following year, when she was put in charge of presenting the debate of Gran Hermano VIP. Her popularity on the network was confirmed when she was chosen, with Manel Fuentes, to broadcast the New Year's Eve 2003 chimes from the Puerta del Sol in Madrid.

In the summer of 2004, and after the departure of María Teresa Campos to Antena 3, the channel put her temporarily in charge of the program that the presenter from Malaga had been presenting since 1996: 1996: Día a día, alongside Óscar Martínez.

After that experience, she has been in charge of other projects that have failed, such as the late–night Plan C (2005) or the game show Esta cocina es un infierno (2006), both of which were withdrawn from the programming grid a few weeks after their premiere. At the end of 2006, she was hired by La Sexta and on 8 January 2007, she began presenting the game show Tres en Raya. Once again, the low ratings caused the program to be withdrawn from the schedule two weeks later.

On 5 March 2007, she began a new stage on the Catalan channel 8TV, presenting for five months the daily late show Envasat al 8. At the same time, in May of that year, she was suddenly signed by TVE to host the special Eurovisión program, after the cancellation of the initially chosen presenter, Paula Vázquez, at the last moment.

On 7 May 2007, she returned to Canal 9 to present, with Tony Kamo, Sessió hipnótica, a show based on hypnosis broadcast weekly in prime time by the Valencian regional broadcaster. The space, however, was withdrawn from the programming shortly after its premiere.

In September 2007, after leaving 8TV, she joined the program Channel nº4 on Cuatro, as a collaborator, although shortly after she left it to face her maternity.

She returned to the small screen on 15 March 2008, as host of the nostalgic show Yo estuve allí, broadcast weekly on TVE's La 1 until 7 June, of that year, ending without being renewed for a second season, after having achieved an audience below the network's average.

On 7 September 2008, she returned to La Sexta to present the reality show De patitas en la calle. However, after five episodes and a progressive decline in ratings —to the point of falling below the network's average— the program was withdrawn from the schedule.

On 21 May 2009, she started her comedy show Disculpin la interrupció on La 2 by TVE's Catalan channel.

Since 2011, she collaborates in the program Divendres of TV3 and during the summer of the same year she takes charge of a section in which she comments on the press of the heart and television news in El matí de Catalunya Ràdio d'estiu of the radio station Catalunya Ràdio And later, she collaborates, along with other great artists, in the program of Antena 3 Tu cara me suena.

On 2 August 2012, she participated in the Antena 3 program Dando la nota presented by Jaime Cantizano. On 3 December 2012, she returns to Tu cara me suena, now in its second season, this time as a member of the program's jury, replacing Carolina Cerezuela due to her pregnancy.

At the end of January 2013, she confirmed on Twitter that she was going to present the program, Se trata de ti, on La 2. On 26 February 2013, she was in charge of presenting the gala to choose the song for the Eurovision Song Contest 2013 that took place in Malmö, Suecia.

On 19 September 2014, she became a mother of a large family, giving birth to twins, Tomeu and Paulina.

On 10 June 2018, it was announced that she would be in charge of hosting the inaugural broadcast of the television channel À Punt. The program À Punt Directe will be broadcast for 2 1/2 seasons until 18 December 2020, when its cancellation is announced due to low ratings.

== Filmography ==
=== Television programs ===
Programas de televisión
Title	Title	Channel	Role
1998–2000	Tela marinera	Canal Nou	Co–host
1999	Fiebre del domingo noche	Telecinco	Host
2003	A tu lado	Telecinco	Host
2003	Gran hermano: El Debate	Telecinco	Host
2003	Campanadas de Fin de Año	Telecinco	Host
2004	Gran hermano VIP: El Debate	Telecinco	Host of the debate
2004	Día a día	Telecinco	Co–host
2005	Plan C	Telecinco	Host
2006	Esta cocina es un infierno	Telecinco	Host
2007	Tres en raya	La Sexta	Host
2007	Envasat al 8	8tv	Host
2007–2008	Channel nº 4	Cuatro	Collaborator
2008	Yo estuve allí	La 1	Host
2009	Disculpin la interrupció	La 1	Host
2011 – 2014; 2021	Tu cara me suena	Antena 3	Contestant (2011) Juror (2012–2013) Invited (2014; 2021)
2011–2015	Divendres	TV3	Collaborator
2013	Se trata de ti	La 2	Host
2013–2020	Pasapalabra	Telecinco y Antena 3	Guest
2014	El pueblo más divertido	La 1	Jurado
2015–2016	Trencadis	8tv	Co–host
2017	Vidas en orden	TEN	Host
2017	¡Boom!	Antena 3	Guest
2018–2020	À Punt Directe	À Punt	Host
2018	Assumptes Interns	À Punt	Guest
2018–2021	Campanadas de Fin de Año	À Punt	Host
2020	Mascletà À Punt	À Punt	Host
2020	La terrassa	À Punt	Host
2021 – present	Atrapa’m si pots	À Punt	Host
2021 – present	Tresors amb història	À Punt	Host
2021	Atrápame si puedes	Telemadrid	Guest

=== Films ===
Películas
Title	Title	Channel	Notes
1999	Bloody Maruja	Carol	Short film
2001	Cartes d'amor	Mujer	Short film
2004	Deus ex machina	Carolina	Short film
2004	Copropietarios	Propietaria	Short film
2004	El cruce	Carolina	Telefilm
2013	Tres 60	Madre de Guillermo	Minor role
2015	Ocho apellidos catalanes	Mujer	Minor role

=== Television series ===
Series de televisión
Title	Title	Character	Duration
2004	7 vidas	Silvia	1 Episode
