= María Antonia Iglesias =

Spanish writer and journalist

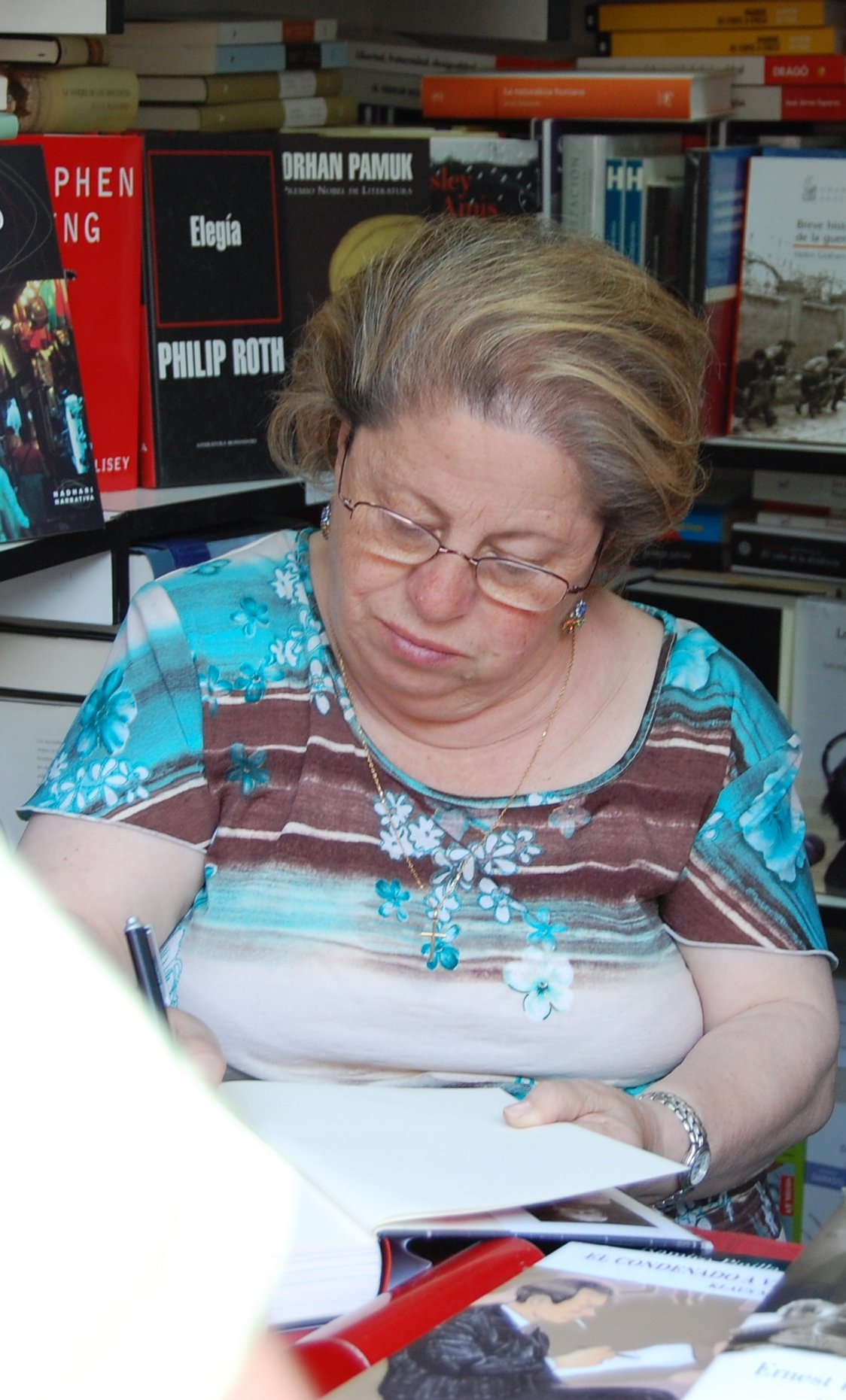
- Iglesias in 2007
- Born: María Antonia Iglesias González; 15 January 1945; Madrid, Spain
- Died: 29 July 2014 (aged 69); Nigrán, Galicia, Spain
- Education: Escuela Oficial de Periodismo
- Occupations: Journalist; writer
- Years active: 1968–2013
- Children: 1
- Father: Antonio Iglesias Álvarez

María Antonia Iglesias González (15 January 1945 – 29 July 2014) was a Spanish writer and journalist.

Iglesias was born in Madrid. Her father was the pianist and musicologist Antonio Iglesias Álvarez, and she worked on publications such as Informaciones, Triunfo, Tiempo, Interviú, or El País'.

Iglesias said in many media that although she was Catholic she did not agree with many attitudes of the current Roman Catholic Church. She died in Panxón, Nigrán, Province of Pontevedra, aged 69.

== Radio ==
- Hoy por hoy, (Cadena SER)
- La Brújula (2002, Onda Cero)
- Protagonistas (2004–2006, Punto Radio)

== Television ==
- Informe Semanal, 1984, RTVE
- Día a día (1996–2004, Telecinco)
- Cada día (2004–2005–2006, Telecinco)
- Lo que inTeresa (2006, Antena 3)
- Las Mañanas de Cuatro (2006–2009, Cuatro)
- Madrid opina (2006–2008, Telemadrid)
- La mirada crítica (2008, Telecinco)
- La noria (2008–2011, Telecinco)

== Bibliography ==
- Memoria de Euskadi. La terapia de la verdad: todos lo cuentan todo (2009)
- Cuerpo a cuerpo. Cómo son y cómo piensan los políticos españoles (2007)
- Maestros de la República. Los otros santos, los otros mártires (2006)
- La memoria recuperada. Lo que nunca han contado Felipe González y los dirigentes socialistas (2003)
- Aquella España dulce y amarga / Carmen Sevilla y Paco Rabal (1999)
- Ermua, cuatro días de julio (1997), about Miguel Ángel Blanco.
