= Sonia Ferrer =

Spanish actress (born 1977)

Sonia Ferrer González
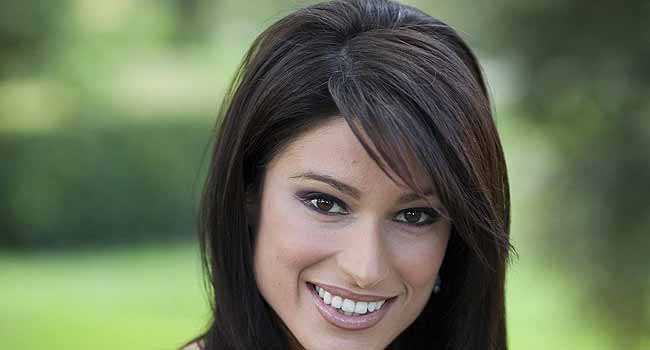
- Born: 26 September 1977 (age 48); Barcelona, Catalonia, Spain
- Occupations: presenter, actress, model
- Height: 170 cm (5 ft 7 in)
- Spouse: Marco Vricella (2007-2013)
- Children: Laura Vricella Ferrer

Sonia Ferrer González (born 26 September 1977) is an actress, model and television presenter on Spanish television.

== Biography ==
Sonia Ferrer was born in Barcelona, Catalonia, Spain. She is the only child of parents Victoria González and Josep Ferrer. Ferrer is a presenter, model and actress. Ferrer was enrolled for six years in the Rosella Hightower Ballet School in Paris. Afterwards, she made Tourism Company Technician, and Locution, Writing and Presentation in Radio and Television studies.

She first worked on television when she played a role in a 13-part mini series for TVE Catalunya called Happy House. She then worked as a presenter on the program Cosmopolitan Café for Via Digital on its Cosmopolitan Channel. Between 2000 and 2008, she co-presented Gente on TVE 1, with Pepa Bueno and then with María Jose Molina.

In 2002, she played a role 'Cleonice' in the film Lisístrata. In 2003, she joined the cast of TVE telenovela Luna negra.

In May 2006, TVE chose Ferrer to announce the Spanish votes for the Eurovision Song Contest. In April 2007, Ferrer hosted the local version of Soundmixshow, Lluvia de estrellas, on TVE 1. In 2011, she co-hosted the political talk show Con voz y voto on Telemadrid, alongside Melchor Miralles. From July 2013 to September 2013, she co-hosted reality show Campamento de verano on Telecinco, alongside Joaquín Prat. Since February 2015, she has made frequent appearances as a panelist on talk show Amigas y conocidas, on TVE 1.

== Personal life ==
She announced that she would marry her partner Marco Vricella in the summer of 2007. The couple have a daughter born in 2010.

== Television ==
=== Programs ===
Year	Program	Channel	Notes
2000 – 2008	Gente	La 1	Presenter
2002	Cartagena te conquistará	La 1	Presenter
2002 – 2003	Grand Prix	La 1	Madrina
2004 – 2014; 2018; 2020	Pasapalabra	Telecinco / Antena 3	Invitada
2004	Murcia, qué hermosa eres	La 1	Presenter
2004	Contigo	La 1	Presenter
2006	La Rioja, tierra universal	La 1	Presenter
2007	Lluvia de estrellas	La 1	Presenter
2009	Aquí no hay playa	Telemadrid	Presenter
2009 – 2010	Campanadas de fin de año	Telemadrid	Presenter
2011	Con voz y voto	Telemadrid	Copresentadora
2013	¡Mira quién salta!	Telecinco	Concursante
2013	Campamento de verano	Telecinco	Presenter
2015 – 2018	Amigas y conocidas	La 1	Presenter
2018 – 2021	Buenos días, Madrid	Telemadrid	Collaborator and presenter
2018 – 2020	De todo corazón	Telemadrid	Presenter
2019 – 2021	Está pasando	Telemadrid	Collaborator and presenter
2020	El cazador	La 1	Contestant
2021 – presente	Espejo público	Antena 3	Collaborator
2022	Ya es mediodía	Telecinco	Collaborator
2023	Ana	Telecinco	Collaborator
2023 – presente	En boca de todos	Cuatro	Collaborator
2024	Bárbara Rey, mi verdad	Telecinco	Collaborator

=== Fiction ===
- Happy House (1999) as Yolanda, on TVE Catalunya.
- Luna negra (2003) as Mati, on TVE 1.
- ¿Se puede? (2004), on TVE 1.

=== Specials ===
- Cartagena te conquistará (2002), on TVE 1.
- Murcia, qué hermosa eres (2004), on TVE 1.
- Contigo (2004), on TVE 1.
- Gala de la Rioja (2006), on TVE 1.
- Quién me iba a decir (David Bisbal special) (2006), on TVE 1.
- Eurovision Song Contest 2006 (2006), Spanish spokesperson.

== See also ==
- Catalan people
- Inés Sastre
- Natalia Estrada
- Ana Alvarez
- Almudena Fernández

== Resources ==
- Sonia Ferrer Video Archive
- Website Dedicated To Sonia Ferrer
- Sonia Ferrer at IMDb
- Biography in Spanish
- Photos
