= Jimmy Giménez-Arnau =

Spanish journalist, writer and television personality (1943–2024)

- Born: Joaquín José Victor Bernardo Giménez-Arnau Puente; 14 September 1943
- Died: 17 September 2024 (aged 81)
- Years active: 1977–2024
- Known for: Journalism
- Spouse(s): María del Mar Martínez-Bordiú y Franco (1977–82); María Teresa Fernández Peral (1987–93); Sandra Salgado González (2013–present)
- Children: 2
- Father: José Antonio Giménez-Arnau

Joaquín José Victor Bernardo Giménez-Arnau Puente (14 September 1943 – 17 September 2024), better known as Jimmy Giménez-Arnau, was a Spanish journalist, author and television personality.

== Biography ==
The son of the author and diplomat José Antonio Giménez-Arnau, and his wife María Inés Puente García-Arnaiz, Giménez-Arnau was born in Brazilian waters on the Spanish liner Cabo de Hornos. Between the ages of seven and nine, Giménez-Arnau studied in an English school, allowing him to achieve fluency in the language. He graduated in law and journalism, and took part in boxing and football in his youth, in addition to being an art seller.

As a journalist, he was the war correspondent for the satirical magazine Hermano Lobo, for which he wrote under the pseudonym "Jimmy Corso". In 1980, together with Julio Wizuete he directed, starred in and wrote the film Cocaína. In 1983 he created the television soap Onda Blúmini.

As a writer, he started to write poems and published Cuya selva ("Whose jungle") and La soledad distinta ("Distinct loneliness"). In 1977 he published his first novel, Las islas transparientes. In 2020, he published his autobiography, La vida jugada.

As a journalist, he presented the Antena 3 Radio show Hora de lobos, and on television he has appeared on shows such as the Telecinco shows La máquina de verdad and Sálvame, the regional chat show Tómbola, and the Antena 3 show Sabor a ti.

=== Personal life and death ===
On 3 August 1977, Giménez-Arnau married María del Mar Martínez-Bordiu y Franco, the granddaughter of Francisco Franco, whom he met at a party. They have a daughter, Leticia, however he has admitted he doesn't see her. During their marriage they lived in the Palace of Canto del Pico. Ten years later, he got together with a model, and in 1993 Giménez-Arnau and Martínez-Bordiu split. This immediately made him a figure of the tabloid press. Giménez-Arnau has used his status as a relative of the Francos to criticise the family, especially in his book Yo, Jimmy: La vida entre los Franco.

In April 2013, Giménez-Arnau married the journalist Sandra Salgado, 35 years his junior.

Giménez-Arnau died on 17 September 2024, three days after his 81st birthday.

== Controversies ==
On 20 October 1993, on the Protagonistas radio chat show, Giménez-Arnau had a disagreement with the actress Norma Duval, during which Giménez-Arnau had criticised Ms. Duval. Duval eventually threw one of her shoes at Giménez-Arnau. Later on, Duval said she wanted to make peace with Giménez-Arnau, but had not relented.

According to the newspaper El País, on 29 June 1994 Giménez-Arnau was detained by police on suspicion of drug trafficking when leaving the Telecinco studios. The police seized 10 grams of cocaine, and his car was searched in case he was hiding more.

On 23 July 2009, Giménez-Arnau fought with sports journalist Pipi Estrada on the set of the Telecinco chat show Sálvame. Giménez-Arnau claimed Estrada had stepped on his head, but the courts sided with Estrada.

== Television credits ==
Year	Title	Role	Channel
1990	Noche VIP	Collaborator	Telecinco
1993, 1994	La maquina de verdad	Collaborator	Telecinco
1993	Las mañanas de Tele 5	Collaborator	Telecinco
1994, 1995	¿De qué parte estás?	Collaborator	Telecinco
2000–2004	Tómbola	Collaborator	Canal Nou
2004–2005	Cada día	Collaborator	Antena 3
2007–2012	DEC	Collaborator	Antena 3
2007–2012	La noria	Collaborator	Telecinco
2009–2023	(Sálvame) Deluxe	Collaborator	Telecinco
2009–2010, 2020	Sálvame	Collaborator	Telecinco
2012	El gran debate	Collaborator	Telecinco
2018	Hechos reales	Collaborator	Telecinco
2018–2020	El programa de Ana Rosa	Collaborator	Telecinco
2020	Lazos de sangre	Reportero	La 1
2020	Hormigas blancas	Collaborator	Telecinco
2021–2022	Todo es verdad	Collaborator	Cuatro
2022	En el nombre de Rocío	Collaborator	Telecinco
