= Jesús Mariñas =

Spanish gossip journalist and TV personality (1942–2022)

Jesús Manuel Pérez Mariñas (3 October 1942 – 10 May 2022) was a Spanish gossip journalist.

== Career ==
Mariñas was born on 3 October 1942 in A Coruña, Galicia, Spain. At the age of 14 he began to study declamation at the Conservatory of his hometown and, influenced by a teacher, because he wanted to be an artist, he studied journalism at the Autonomous University of Barcelona. Later he moved to Madrid where, thanks to the help of the journalist linked to the press of the Franco regime Jesús Vasallo, he worked in the newspaper El Periódico Mediterráneo. In 1967 he moved to Barcelona and working for Tele/eXprés he began to know the world of the gossip journalism, working as editor of magazines such as Semana and Pronto.

At the end of the 70's he began to work in the program Protagonistas, of Luis del Olmo, first at Radio Peninsular, then at Radio Nacional de España (RNE) and finally at COPE, until June 1988. That year he joined Radio Miramar in Barcelona to be part of the program Cosas and Mitad y mitad and collaborated in COPE's program El primero de la mañana and worked for Época magazine, until 2000.

In the 90's Mariñas jumped to television, the peak of his professional career. He then collaborated in successful programs like La máquina de la verdad –alongside María Teresa Campos– Pasa la vida and Día a día. At the end of that decade he began his career in the program Tómbola with Karmele Marchante, Lydia Lozano and Ángel Antonio Herrera, becoming one of the most highly paid periodites in the industry.

His subsequent career was spent in the TV programs such as En Antena (2006), ¿Dónde estás corazón? (2007), A 3 bandas (2007), Tal cual lo contamos (2008), Vaya par (2009) and Espejo público (2009-2012), Sálvame (since 2013), Qué tiempo tan feliz, Sábado Deluxe and La Mañana de la 1. In Summer 2021 published his own book, 'Jesús por Mariñas, memorias desde el corazón'.

== Controversies and legal problems ==
Mariñas was known to be quite controversial. He received a warning from the office of the Prime Minister of Spain Felipe González for his treatment of his wife Carmen Romero López. In 1991, together with the director of the magazine Épocas Jaime Campmany, they were sentenced to pay 21 million pesetas for "moral damages" to the socialite Marta Chávarri, since the court considered that her chronicles were "an unlawful interference in the rights to honor and to personal and family privacy". In August of that same year, he received a punch from the Nobel Prize writer Camilo José Cela, because Mariñas accused him of selling his wedding to a magazine.

== Personal life and death ==
He married Venezuelan photographer Elio Valderrama, his partner for 27 years, on 18 July 2016.

In October 2021 he announced that two months earlier he was diagnosed with bladder cancer. He was urgently admitted to the Ramón y Cajal Hospital in Madrid on 31 March 2022. Mariñas died on 10 May 2022 at the age of 79 at the Madrilenian hospital of San Rafael.
