= Terelu Campos =

Spanish radio and television presenter

- Born: Teresa Lourdes Borrego Campos; 31 August 1965 (age 60); Málaga, Spain
- Occupations: Presenter; writer; businesswoman
- Spouses: Miguel Ángel Polvorinos (1993–1996); Alejandro Rubio (1998–2003)
- Children: 1
- Parents: José María Borrego Doblas (father); María Teresa Campos (mother)
- Career
- Show: Las Campos
- Network: RTVE (1984–2008); Telecinco (1996–present); Telemadrid (1997–2004); Antena 3 (2004–2006); Cuatro (2017–2018)

Teresa Lourdes Borrego Campos (born 31 August 1965) is a Spanish radio and TV presenter, tertulia participant, and businesswoman. She is the elder daughter of journalist and presenter María Teresa Campos.

== Biography ==
=== Early years ===
Terelu Campos was born at Dr. Gálvez Hospital in Málaga, the eldest daughter of María Teresa Campos Luque and José María Borrego Doblas, both broadcasters on Radio Juventud. Her sister Carmen Borrego was born in 1966.

She took COU classes at Málaga's Institución Teresiana. Due to the death of her father, she left her studies and began her professional career in 1984, working for Radiocadena Española as a presenter, writer, and producer on the programs Apueste por una and Te vas a Enterar, directed by Mara Colás. In 1987 she directed and presented Las Mañanas de la Cadena Rato for Radio Torcal in Málaga.

=== Professional career ===
In 1988 she appeared in the film Zocta, solo en la Tierra se puede ser extraterrestre, directed by Joe Rígoli. That year she also left radio to join Jesús Hermida's program Por la mañana as producer and musical coordinator, and later her mother's programs A mi manera (1989–1990) and Ésta es su casa (1990–1991). In 1990 she presented several programs (musicals and interviews), while continuing her activity as a music producer on TVE's Pasa la vida. She likewise participated in TVE's Christmas program Telepasión Española.

In 1995 she appeared in four chapters of the Antena 3 series Canguros, playing the sister of Almudena (Ana Risueño). In 1996 she moved to Telecinco to write and co-present María Teresa Campos' program Día a día until June 1997. In 1997 she also presented the Miss Spain gala.

In June 1997, she began to present an interview and variety program called En Exclusiva, broadcast by Nou and Telemadrid. That September she began to combine this with presenting the magazine Con T de tarde on Telemadrid. This was on the air until June 2004. In September 2004 she was hired by Antena 3, where she collaborated with her mother on the morning program Cada día. That year she also presented the game show La Granja on the same channel. In 2005 she returned to present the second edition of La Granja.

From 2006 to 2007 she participated in the monologue contest El club de Flo on laSexta. In the last quarter of 2008, she participated as a contestant in Mira quién baila on TVE, along with Ana Obregón and Vicky Martín Berrocal.

In 2007, she was hired by Telecinco, a channel where she continues to work today, debuting as a contributor on the show La noria. In 2009 she became the co-host of ¡Qué tiempo tan feliz! with María Teresa Campos. In 2010 she began to contribute to Sálvame and Mira quien mira. In addition, from 2010 to 2014 she presented Sálvame Deluxe (later known as Sábado Deluxe) during holiday periods. In February 2011, she led the special La Caja Deluxe.

In January 2014, she announced on the Telecinco program Sálvame that she would take a few months off from television, since she was not happy working. That July she confirmed her return to television after the summer to resume her role as a contributor on Sálvame.

In 2016 she became the protagonist, along with her mother, of the Telecinco docu-reality show Las Campos.

In 2017 she participated for a week as a kitchen coach of the house, out of competition, on the fifth edition of Gran Hermano VIP.

She has been the administrator of her own company, Rubitecam, S.L., since 1997.

She was one of five presenters of the 2017–2018 New Year's Eve show.

== Personal life ==
Terelu was married to Miguel Ángel Polvorinos from 1993 to 1996. Two years later she married Alejandro Rubio, with whom she has a daughter, Alejandra Rubio Borrego. The couple divorced in 2003. Since then she has had relationships with Pipi Estrada, Kike Calleja, Carlos Pombo, and José Valenciano.

On 14 November 2011, Terelu was on the cover of Interviú magazine. On 16 January 2012, she announced on Sálvame that she was temporarily leaving television because, she said:

I detected this little lump when I returned from Hawaii. I knew I did not have it before, and I was convinced from the start that it was not good.

On 18 January 2012 she had surgery for a carcinoma in her breast at the Jiménez Díaz Foundation University Hospital. On 19 January, Terelu Campos left the hospital, saying that she felt well and that she was going to continue treatment.

In July 2018, she had to undergo another operation after a tumor was detected, this time in her left breast.

== Career ==
=== TV programs ===
Year	Title	Channel	Notes
1987–89	Por la mañana	TVE	Producer
1989–90	A mi manera	TVE	Contributor
1990–91	Esta es su casa	TVE	Contributor
1991–96	Pasa la vida	TVE	Producer and contributor
1996–97	Día a día	Telecinco	Contributor and co-presenter
1997	Miss Spain 1997 Gala	Telecinco	Presenter
1997	En Exclusiva	Nou	Presenter
1997–2004	Con T de tarde	Telemadrid	Presenter
2004–05	Cada día	Antena 3	Contributor
2004–05	La Granja	Antena 3	Presenter
2007	Locos x Madrid	Telemadrid	Co-presenter
2007–12	La noria	Telecinco	Contributor
2009–17	¡Qué tiempo tan feliz!	Telecinco	Co-presenter
2010–present	Sálvame	Telecinco	Contributor
2010–14	Sálvame Deluxe	Telecinco	Presenter
2010	Mira quien mira	Telecinco	Contributor
2011	La Caja Deluxe	Telecinco	Presenter
2017	Mad in Spain	Telecinco	Contributor
2017–18	Campanadas Fin de Año	Telecinco and Cuatro	Presenter

=== Reality shows ===
Year	Title	Channel	Notes
2006–07	El club de Flo	laSexta	Contestant – 2nd finalist
2007–08	Mira quién baila	La 1	Contestant – 6th
2016–18	Las Campos	Telecinco	Protagonist
2017	Gran Hermano VIP 5	Telecinco	Guest VIP
2020	Mask Singer: Adivina quién canta	Antena 3	Contestant as Piggie – 7th
2021	MasterChef Celebrity	La 1	Contestant – 11th

=== Radio programs ===
Year	Title	Station	Notes
1984	Apueste por una	Radiocadena Española	Contributor
1984	Te vas a enterar	Radiocadena Española	Contributor
1987	Las Mañanas de la Cadena Rato	Radio Torcal	Presenter

=== Films ===
Year	Title	Role	Notes
1988	Zocta, solo en la Tierra se puede ser extraterrestre	Presenter – herself	Minor part

=== TV series ===
Year	Title	Channel	Role	Notes
1993–99	Telepasión española	La 1	Hermana Campolán	4 episodes
1995	Canguros	Antena 3	Sister of Almudena	4 episodes
2018–present	Paquita Salas	Netflix	Bárbara Valiente	1 episode

=== Published works ===
- Frente al espejo (2017, together with Kike Calleja) ISBN 9788417001162
