= Gran Hermano VIP =

Television show

- Directed by: Jaime Guerra; Álvaro Díaz; Juan Salgueiro; Pilar Blasco; María Zambrano; David Linares
- Presented by: Marta Flich (8); Ion Aramendi (8); Jorge Javier Vázquez (6–7); Jordi González (3–5; 7; 9–); Jesús Vázquez (1–2)
- Country of origin: Spain
- Original language: Spanish
- No. of seasons: 8

Production
- Producer: Endemol
- Running time: 210 minutes (approx.)

Original release
- Network: Telecinco
- Release: 22 January 2004

Gran Hermano VIP (as known by the acronym GH VIP) is a reality television series broadcast in Spain on Telecinco produced by Endemol. It is the celebrity version of Gran Hermano and part of the Big Brother franchise first developed in the Netherlands. The first edition of the program was broadcast in 2004. As of September 2019, 7 editions of the show have aired.

== Format ==
The mechanic of the contest is essentially the same as the original Big Brother. A number of different Housemates, celebrities with different degrees of fame, are locked up together in a house, where the viewing public can watch them and vote them out of the House as they choose to. The housemates live in isolation from the outside world in a house custom built with everyday objects, like fridges and a garden. The house also includes cameras and microphones in most of the rooms to record all of the activity in the house. The only place where Housemates can be away from the other contestants is in the Diary Room, where they can express their true feelings. The winner is the last contestant remaining in the house and receives a large cash prize. Housemates are evicted weekly throughout the show by the viewing public.

== Season details ==
Season	Launch date	Finale date	Days	Housemates	Winner	Grand Prize	Average viewers (in millions)	Presenters and programmes					
Season	Launch date	Finale date	Days	Housemates	Winner	Grand Prize	Average viewers (in millions)	Galas Nominations & Evictions	Daily highlights	Weekly debates	Última hora	Límite 48 horas	Límite 24 horas
GH VIP: El Desafío	22 January 2004	30 March 2004	69	12	Marlène Mourreau	€60,000	4.29	Jesús Vázquez	Jorge Fernández	Carolina Ferre			
GH VIP 2	6 January 2005	17 March 2005	71	13	Ivonne Armant	€60,000	3.97	Jesús Vázquez	Óscar Martínez	Jordi González			
GH VIP 3	11 January 2015	26 March 2015	75	15	Belén Esteban	€100,000	3.99	Jordi González		Jordi González	Raquel Sánchez Silva		
GH VIP 4	7 January 2016	14 April 2016	99	18	Laura Matamoros	€100,000	2.94	Jordi González		Sandra Barneda		Jordi González	
GH VIP 5	8 January 2017	13 April 2017	96	15	Alyson Eckmann	€100,000	2.11	Jordi González		Sandra Barneda	Lara Álvarez	Jordi González	
GH VIP 6	13 September 2018	20 December 2018	99	16	Miriam Saavedra	€100,000	3.12	Jorge Javier Vázquez		Sandra Barneda	Lara Álvarez		
GH VIP 7	11 September 2019	19 December 2019	100	16	Adara Molinero	€100,000	3.26	Jorge Javier Vázquez(*)	Lara Álvarez	Jordi González	Lara Álvarez	Jorge Javier Vázquez	Carlos Sobera
GH VIP 8	14 September 2023	21 December 2023	99	19	Naomi Asensi	€70,600	0.96	Marta Flich		Ion Aramendi	Lara Álvarez	Marta Flich	
GH VIP 9	2026	2027	TBA	TBA	TBA	TBA	Jorge Javier Vázquez						

- Due to a surgical operation, Jorge Javier was replaced during the 14th and 15th galas, and their corresponding debates, by Jordi González and by Carlos Sobera during the last two Límite 24 horas.
