= Jordi González =

Spanish journalist (born 1962)

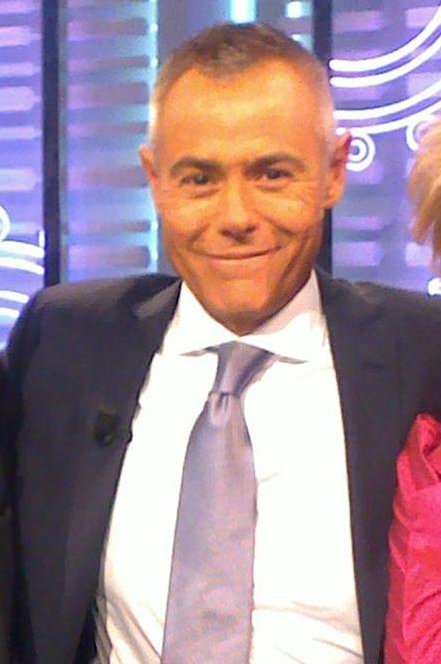
Jordi González

Jordi González Belart (born 26 September 1962 in Barcelona) is a Spanish journalist and television and radio presenter.
