= 2013 in Spanish television =

This is a list of Spanish television related events from 2013.

== Events ==
- 2 January - New TV Channel, Nueve is launched.
- 11 January – Strike action in Telemadrid comes to an end after 28 days.
- 22 March – After the Supreme Court of Spain Decision of 27 November 2012, The Government withdraws 9 operating licences to Media Companies: 2 to Mediaset España, 3 to Atresmedia, 2 to Net TV and 2 to Veo Televisión S. A.
- 26 March – Broadcasting of the 2014 FIFA World Cup qualification football match Spain-France in Telecinco, gets 10,5 millones viewers (52.5% share).
- 1 April – TV Channel Antena 3 Canarias stops broadcasting.
- 30 June – TV Channels Cartoon Network España and Cartoonito shuts down.
- 5 July – TV channel Canal Nou Dos stops broadcasting.
- 7 July – TV channel Cine por M launches.
- 31 July – TV channel MARCA TV ends broadcasting.
- 6 November – Regional TV channel Canal Nou is shut down by the Government of Valencian Community.
- 29 November –
  - TV Channel Canal A starts broadcasting.
  - TV Channel Nou 24 starts broadcasting.
- 19 December – TV Channel Teledeporte HD is launched.
- 31 December – La 1 starts broadcasting in High-definition television.

== Debuts ==
Title	Channel	Debut	Performers/Host	Genre
Familia	Telecinco	2013-01-08	Diego Martín and Alexandra Jiménez	Sitcom
Amar es para siempre	Antena 3	2013-01-14	Manuel Baqueiro and Itziar Miranda	Soap Opera
Expedición imposible	Cuatro	2013-01-23	Raquel Sánchez-Silva.	Reality Show
La Sexta noche	La Sexta	2013-01-26	Iñaki López	Talk Show
La noche de José Mota	13TV	2013-02-04	Antonio Jiménez	Comedy
La noche de José Mota	Telecinco	2013-02-07	José Mota.	Comedy
Increíbles: el gran desafío	Antena 3	2013-02-08	Carlos Sobera	Game Show
Palabra de gitano	Cuatro	2013-02-10		Docudrama
El intermedio: International Edition	La Sexta	2013-02-16	Dani Mateo	News Magazine
Top Trending Tele	La Sexta	2013-02-16		Videos
Así nos va	La Sexta	2013-02-28	Florentino Fernández and Anna Simon	Comedy
Tormenta	Antena 3	2013-02-28	Patricia Vico	TV-Movie
Splash! Famosos al agua	Antena 3	2013-03-04	Arturo Valls	Game Show
Tenemos que hablar	La 1	2013-03-04	Ana García Lozano	Talk Show
¡Mira quién salta!	Telecinco	2013-03-13	Jesús Vázquez	Game Show
¡Atención obras!	La 2	2013-03-15	Cayetana Guillén Cuervo	Science/Culture
Jugones	La Sexta	2013-04-01	Óscar Rincón and Antonio Esteva	Sport
Money time	Cuatro	2013-04-03	Luján Arguelles	Quiz Show
Cupcake Maniacs	Divinity	2013-04-07	Alma Obregón	Cooking Show
¿Qué hago yo aquí?	Cuatro	2013-04-07	Elena Ortega	Travel
El don de Alba	Telecinco	2013-04-09	Martiño Rivas	Drama Series
Al otro lado	Telecinco	2013-04-09	Carmen Porter	Variety Show
MasterChef	La 1	2013-04-10	Eva González	Cooking Show
Las bodas de Sálvame	Telecinco	2013-04-13	Kiko Hernández and Carmen Alcayde	Gossip Show
Bebé a bordo	Divinity	2013-04-14	Montse Cob	Docureality
Desafío en el abismo	Cuatro	2013–04.18	Jesús Calleja	Documentary
Un príncipe para Corina	Cuatro	2013-05-12	Luján Argüelles	Dating Show
Gran Reserva. El origen	La 1	2013-05-13	Víctor Clavijo and Verónica Sánchez	Drama Series
El alma de las empresas	La 1	2013-05-13		Docureality
Taxi	La Sexta	2013-05-13	Miki Nadal and Manolo Sarria	Game Show
Fabricando: Made in Spain	La 1	2013	Liborio García	Docureality
Letris	La 1	2013	Carlos Latre	Game Show
Carta a Eva	La 1	2013-05-30		Miniseries
El objetivo	La Sexta	2013-06-03	Ana Pastor	Talk Show
Cazamariposas	Divinity	2013-06-04	Nuria Marín and Nando Escribano	Gossip Show
Mario Conde. Los días de gloria	Telecinco	2013-07-04	Daniel Grao	Miniseries
Esposados	Telecinco	2013-07-07		Comedy
Viaje al centro de la tele	La 1	2013-07-09		Variety Show
Policías en acción	La Sexta	2013		Docureality
Negocia como puedas	Cuatro	2013-07-15	Raúl Gómez	Game Show
Campamento de verano	Telecinco	2013-07-16	Joaquín Prat and Sonia Ferrer	Reality Show
El palco	La 2	2013-07-21	Ainhoa Arteta	Science/Culture
Camera Kids	Antena 3	2013-07-26		Talk Show
El mánager	Siete	2013-07-29	Baby Solano	Reality Show
Tiki-Taka	Cuatro	2013-08-19		Sport
Entre todos	La 1	2013-08-26	Toñi Moreno	Public Service
Vive cantando	Antena 3	2013-09-03	María Castro and Manuel Galiana	Music
Encarcelados	La Sexta	2013-09-05		Docureality
Abre los ojos... y mira	Telecinco	2013-09-07	Emma García	Variety Show
Ciudadanos somos todos	Antena 3	2013-09-11	Julia Otero	Talk Show
Código Emprende	La 1	2013-09-11	Juan Ramón Lucas	Docureality
24 horas en la calle	La 1	2013-09-12		Docureality
We love Tamara	Cosmopolitan TV	2013-09-12	Tamara Falcó	Docudrama
Los mayores gamberros	Antena 3	2013-09-13		Comedy
Por arte de magia	Antena 3	2013-09-13	Anna Simon	Talent Show
España a ras de cielo	La 1	2013-09-17	Francis Lorenzo	Travel
Sincronizados	La 1	2013-09-17		Docureality
Torres y Reyes	La 2	2013-09-26	Mara Torres and Joaquín Reyes	Talk Show
Natural Frank	Cuatro	2013-09-27	Frank Cuesta	Documentary
Top Chef	Antena 3	2013-10-02	Alberto Chicote	Cooking Show
El almacén de Top Chef	Antena 3	2013-10-02	Paula Vázquez	Talk Show
Uno de los nuestros	La 1	2013-10-05	Carlos Latre	Talent Show
Stolen Children	Telecinco	2013-10-16	Blanca Portillo and Adriana Ugarte	Miniseries
Efecto ciudadano	La 2	2013-10-20	Arnau Benlloch and Núria Portet	Public Service
Piensa en positivo	La 2	2013-10-21	Pablo Pineda	Public Service
The Time in Between	Antena 3	2013-10-21	Adriana Ugarte	Drama Series
Cachitos de hierro y cromo	La 2	2013-10-27	Virginia Díaz	Music
Tu oportunidad	La 1	2013-10-30	Juanjo Pardo	Talent Show
Generación Rock	La 1	2013-11-05	Melendi	Music
Me resbala	Antena 3	2013-11-15	Arturo Valls	Comedy
Zapeando	La Sexta	2013-11-18	Frank Blanco	Comedy
En el aire	La Sexta	2013-11-18	Andreu Buenafuente and Berto Romero	Late Night
Inteligencia artificial	Cuatro	2013-11-19	Luján Argüelles	Variety Show
¿Quién quiere casarse con mi madre?	Cuatro	2013-11-19	Luján Argüelles	Dating Show
Se enciende la noche	Telecinco	2013-11-19	Jordi González	Late Night
The Wall (El muro)	Cuatro	2013-11-24	Jesús Cintora	News Magazine
Fiesta suprema	La 2	2013-11-25		Variety Show
La incubadora de negocios	Cuatro	2013-12-02	Raquel Sánchez-Silva	Docureality
Lab: Tal como somos	La Sexta	2013-12-15		Docureality
Se hace saber	La 1	2013-12-24	Goyo Jiménez	Comedy
MasterChef Junior	La 1	2013-12-23	Eva González	Cooking Show

== Television shows ==
- La 1
  - Telediario (1957– )
  - Informe Semanal (1973– )
  - Parlamento (1978–2014)
  - Los Desayunos de TVE (1994–2020)
  - Cine de barrio (1995– )
  - Corazón (1997– )
  - Cuéntame cómo pasó (2001– )
  - España Directo (2005– )
  - Comando actualidad (2008– )
  - Españoles en el mundo (2009 – )
  - Los misterios de Laura (2009–2014)
  - Águila Roja (2009–2016)
  - La Mañana de La 1 (2009–2020)
  - Un País para comérselo (2010–2014)
  - Audiencia abierta (2012– )
  - Flash Moda (2012– )
  - Cocina con Sergio (2012–2015)
  - El Debate de la 1 (2012–2017)
- Antena 3
  - Antena 3 Noticias (1990– )
  - Espejo público (1996– )
  - La ruleta de la fortuna (2006– )
  - Karlos Arguiñano en tu cocina (2010– )
  - Tu cara me suena (2011– )
  - El Hormiguero (2011– )
  - Atrapa un millón (2011–2014)
  - El secreto de Puente Viejo (2011–2020)
  - ¡Ahora caigo! (2011–2021)
  - Centímetros cúblicos (2012– )
  - Con el culo al aire (2012–2014)
- La 2
  - Al filo de lo imposble (1982– )
  - Pueblo de Dios (1982– )
  - Últimas preguntas (1983– )
  - En portada (1984– )
  - Metrópolis (1985– )
  - Documentos TV (1986– )
  - Tendido cero (1986– )
  - Días de cine (1991– )
  - La Aventura del saber (1992– )
  - Jara y sedal (1992– )
  - La 2 noticias (1994–2020)
  - La noche temática, (1995– )
  - Agrosfera (1997– )
  - El escarabajo verde (1997– )
  - Saber y ganar (1997– )
  - El Cine de La 2 (1998– )
  - Versión española (1998– )
  - Aquí hay trabajo (2000– )
  - España en comunidad (2000–2020)
  - Shalom (2003– )
  - Cámara abierta 2.0 (2007– )
  - Página 2 (2007– )
  - Tres14 (2007–2014)
  - En lengua de signos (2008– )
  - Zoom tendencias ( 2008– )
  - Fábrica de ideas (2008–2017)
  - RTVE responde (2009– )
  - Imprescindibles (2010– )
  - Para todos la Dos (2010– )
  - Mitad invisible, La (2010–2016)
  - Cómo nos reímos (2012– )
- La Sexta
  - El Intermedio (2006– )
  - La Sexta Noticias (2006– )
  - Salvados (2008– )
  - Al rojo vivo (2011– )
  - La Sexta columna (2012– )
  - Más vale tarde (2012– )
  - Pesadilla en la cocina (2012–2020)
- Cuatro
  - Cuarto milenio (2005– )
  - Callejeros (2005–2014)
  - Noticias Cuatro (2005–2019)
  - Supernanny (2006–2017)
  - Las mañanas de Cuatro (2006–2018)
  - Desafío extremo (2007–2014)
  - 21 días (2009–2016)
  - Hermano mayor (2009–2017)
  - Granjero busca esposa (2009–2018)
  - Diario de (2010–2014)
  - Conexión Samanta (2010–2016)
  - ¿Quién quiere casarse con mi hijo? (2012–2017)
- Telecinco
  - Informativos Telecinco (1990– )
  - Survivor Spain (2000– )
  - Big Brother Spain (2000–2017)
  - Gran Hermano VIP (2004–2019)
  - El Programa de Ana Rosa (2005– )
  - Aída (2005–2014)
  - Pasapalabra (2007–2019)
  - Survivor Spain (2006– )
  - La que se avecina (2007– )
  - Pasapalabra (2007–2019)
  - I love TV (2008–2015)
  - Mujeres y Hombres y Viceversa (2008–2018)
  - Sálvame (2009– )
  - Deluxe (2009– )
  - De buena ley (2009–2014)
  - ¡Qué tiempo tan feliz! (2009–2017)
  - Hay una cosa que te quiero decir (2012–2015)
  - La Voz (2012–2017)

== Ending this year ==
- La 1
  - Destino Eurovisión (2004–2013)
  - Gran reserva (2010–2013)
  - +Gente (2011–2013)
- Telecinco
  - Tú sí que vales (2008–2013)
  - Frágiles (2012–2013)
  - El gran debate (2012–2013)
  - Materia reservada (2012–2013)
- Antena 3
  - Club Megatrix (1995–2013)
  - El Club del Chiste (2010–2013)
  - El Barco (2011–2013)
  - Equipo de investigación (2011–2013)
  - Gran Hotel (2011–2013)
  - Fenómenos (2012–2013)
  - Luna, el misterio de Calenda (2012–2013)
  - El Número Uno (2012–2013)
- La 2
  - Redes (1996–2013)
  - Mi reino por un caballo (2010–2013)
- Cuatro
  - Callejeros viajeros (2009–2013)
  - Frank de la jungla (2010–2013)
  - Me cambio de familia (2011–2013)
  - Perdidos en la ciudad (2011–2013)
  - Lo sabe, no lo sabe (2012–2013)
  - Te vas a enterar (2012–2013)
- Marca TV
  - Futboleros (2010–2013)

== Changes of network affiliation ==
Equipo de investigación (2011– )	Antena 3	La Sexta

== Deaths ==
- 17 January – Fernando Guillén, actor, 80.
- 5 February – Joan Dalmau, actor, 85.
- 3 March – José Sancho, actor, 68.
- 19 March – José Félix Pons, Sport journalist, 80.
- 3 April – Mariví Bilbao, actress, 83.
- 17 April – Ángel Alcázar, actor, 57.
- 9 May – Alfredo Landa, actor, 80.
- 12 May – Constantino Romero, host and voice actor, 65.
- 23 May – Tate Montoya, singer, composer and host, 64.
- 13 June – Xosé Manuel Olveira, actor, 58.
- 10 July – Concha García Campoy, journalist, 54.
- 24 July
  - Carla Revuelta, director and producer, 38.
  - Enrique Beotas, journalist, 58.
- 21 August – Jorge Horacio Fernández, director, 62.
- 23 August – Álvaro Bultó, host, 51.
- 27 August – Julia Trujillo, actress, 81.
- 30 August – Manuel Martín Ferrand, journalist and director of Antena 3, 72.
- 1 September – Manuel Andrés, actor, 83.
- 24 October – Manolo Escobar, singer and host, 82.
- 25 October – Amparo Soler Leal, actress, 80.
- 7 November – Amparo Rivelles, actress, 88.
- 3 December – Fernando Argenta, musician and host, 68.
- 19 December – Ana María Saizar, voice actress, 89.
- 27 December – Elvira Quintillá, actress, 85.

== See also ==
- 2013 in Spain
- List of Spanish films of 2013
