= MasterChef Celebrity (Spanish TV series) =

Spanish award-winning cooking-reality TV program

- Spanish: MasterChef Celebrity España
- Genre: Cooking show Reality TV
- Created by: Franc Roddam
- Directed by: Patricia Fernández (set); Vicente Florindo (outsides); Hugo Tomás
- Presented by: Eva González (2016–19)
- Judges: Pepe Rodríguez Rey (2016–present); Jordi Cruz (2016–present); Samantha Vallejo-Nágera (2016–present)
- Opening theme: "Cabecera de MasterChef Celebrity" by ORCAM
- Composer: Lucas Vidal
- Country of origin: Spain
- Original language: Castilian Spanish
- No. of seasons: 7
- No. of episodes: 75

Production
- Executive producers: Macarena Rey & Alexa Portillo (Shine); Javier González Fernández (RTVE)
- Producers: Begoña Rumeu; Rafael Plaza
- Production locations: Fuente el Saz de Jarama, Madrid, Spain
- Editors: Juan Carlos Carrasco; Luis Cachón
- Camera setup: Single-camera
- Running time: 190 minutes
- Production company: Shine Iberia
- Budget: €6.936.130 (season 7)

Original release
- Network: La 1
- Release: 6 November 2016 – 29 November 2022

Related
- MasterChef; MasterChef Junior

MasterChef Celebrity is a Spanish competitive reality television cooking show based on the British television cooking game show of the same title. It is a special spin-off of the series MasterChef Spain, that premiered on La 1 on 10 April 2013. The show was hosted by Eva González until the 4th season of the series. Jordi Cruz, Samantha Vallejo-Nágera and Pepe Rodríguez repeat as the judges of the show as in the amateur editions. The first season premiered 6 November 2016.

AqA group of public life characters will have to demonstrate, through their week-to-week recipes, they are the "Spain's Celebrity MasterChef". They will have to overcome individual and team skill tests, pressure tests, challenges and elimination tests, under the scrutiny of a jury, composed of the award-winning chefs Pepe Rodríguez Rey, Jordi Cruz and Samantha Vallejo-Nágera.

== Show format ==
Each episode follows the same script, and is divided into three challenges. At the end of every episode, one contestant is evicted.

- First challenge. It happens in the studios. Once they are finished, the judges deliberate and the two to three best dishes determine who will be the captains in the following challenge. It has variable formats and it changes each episode; the most common are:
  - Mystery Box Challenge. The contestants receive ingredients with which they have to make a dish according to the specifications of the judges. The contestants have a certain amount of time to complete the task.
  - Creative Test. It is a free dish, but the judges dictate some rules or twists the contestants must follow.
  - Pressure Test. A celebrity chef visits the set and instructs the contestants on how to make their most famous dish. The contestants have to then recreate it. Sometimes the judges make the dishes contestants have to recreate.
- Team Challenge. Is the second challenge each episode. This challenge takes place outside of the kitchens of MasterChef and usually involves cooking for groups of people. The captains have to choose between the dishes that they are going to prepare and which of the other contestants will be on their team. The losing team then faces off in the elimination round.
- Elimination Test. The winning team observes the losing team from the final challenge in the gallery. The losing team has to cook the recipe chosen by the judges. The format of this challenge is usually in the same style as the used in the First challenge. The judges deliberate and the contestant that has made the worst dish is eliminated from the program.

== Series 1 (2016) ==
Contestant	Occupation	Status	
Miguel Ángel Muñoz	Actor	Winner	
Cayetana Guillén Cuervo	Actress and TV host	Runner-up	
Fernando Tejero	Actor	Finalists	
Loles León	Actress	Finalists	
Virginia Troconis	Former model	5th Evicted	
Manuel Díaz, "El Cordobés"	Bullfighter	4th Evicted	
Estefanía Luyk	Model & businesswoman	3rd Evicted	Exempt
Fonsi Nieto	Former MotoGP rider	2nd Evicted	
María del Monte	Singer	Quit	
Niña Pastori	Singer-songwriter	1st Evicted	

=== Follow-up chart ===
No.	Contestants	1st program			2nd program			3rd program			4th program			5th program			6th program		
1	Miguel Ángel	D	Top 2	IMM	WIN	Win	IMM	loss	Win	IMM	loss	Lose	loss	WIN	D	Top 3	Top 2	WIN	Winner
2	Cayetana	Top 2	D	Top 3	WIN	Win	IMM	loss	Win	IMM	Top 4	Lose	WIN	D	D	Top 3	WIN	IMM	Runner-up
3	Fernando	WIN	D	Top 3	D	Win	IMM	loss	Lose	loss	Top 4	Win	IMM	D	Top 2	Top 3	Top 3	Elim	Eliminated
3	Loles	D	WIN	IMM	D	Win	IMM	loss	Lose	WIN	Top 4	Win	IMM	D	WIN	IMM	loss	Elim	Eliminated
5	Virginia	D	D	Top 3	D	Lose	L	WIN	Lose	loss	Top 4	Lose	loss	D	D	Elim	Eliminated		
6	Manuel	D	Top 2	IMM	D	Lose	WIN	loss	Win	IMM	loss	Win	Elim	Eliminated					
7	Estefanía							loss	Lose	Elim	Eliminated								
8	Fonsi	D	L	IMM	D	Lose	Elim	Eliminated											
9	María del Monte	Top 2	D	loss	D	Lose	Quit												
10	Niña Pastori	D	D	Elim	Eliminated														

== Series 2 (2017) ==
Contestant	Occupation	Status	
Saúl Craviotto	Olympic canoeist	Winner	
Silvia Abril	Comedian and actress	Runner-up	4th Evicted
José Corbacho	Filmmaker & comedian	3rd Place	
Patricia Montero	Yo soy Bea actress	Finalist	
Edu Soto	Comedian and actor	9th Evicted	
Anabel Alonso	Actress & comedian	8th Evicted	
Bibiana Fernández	Singer and actress	7th Evicted	
Juan Betancourt	Model	6th Evicted	
Pepón Nieto	Actor	5th Evicted	
Marina San José	Actress	3rd Evicted	
Carlos Baute	Singer-songwriter	2nd Evicted	
Usun Yoon	TV host	1st Evicted	
Francis Lorenzo	Actor	Guest (8th episode)	

=== Follow-up chart ===
No.	Contestants	1st program			2nd program			3rd program			4th program	5th program	6th program	7th program	8th program	9th program	10th program
1	Saúl	D	Lose	Top 2	loss	Win	IMM	D	Lose	Top 2	Winner						
2	Silvia	D	Lose	IMM	WIN	Win	IMM	D	Lose	D	Runner-up						
3	Corbacho	WIN	Lose	WIN	loss	Win	IMM	D	DNP	loss	Elim	Eliminated					
4	Patricia	Top 2	Lose	D	loss	Win	IMM	D	Lose	Top 2	Elim	Eliminated					
5	Edu	D	Lose	IMM	loss	Win	D	D	Win	IMM	Elim	Eliminated					
6	Anabel	loss	Lose	D	loss	Lose	D	D	Win	IMM	Elim	Eliminated					
7	Bibiana	loss	DNP	D	WIN	Lose	D	D	Win	IMM	Elim	Eliminated					
8	Juan	D	Lose	Top 2	loss	Win	WIN	WIN	Lose	D	Elim	Eliminated					
9	Pepón	D	Lose	Top 2	loss	Lose	IMM	Top 2	Win	IMM	Elim	Eliminated					
10	Marina	loss	Lose	loss	loss	Lose	loss	D	Lose	Elim	Eliminated						
11	Carlos	D	Lose	loss	loss	Lose	Elim	Eliminated									
12	Usun	loss	Lose	Elim	Eliminated												

== Series 3 (2018) ==
Contestant	Occupation	Status	
Ona Carbonell	Olympic synchronized swimmer	Winner	
Paz Vega	Actress	Runner-up	
Mario Vaquerizo	Nancys Rubias vocalist	3rd Place	
Antonia Dell'Atte	Top model and TV host	Finalist	5th Evicted
Boris Izaguirre	Writer and TV host	11th Evicted	
Santiago Segura	Torrente actor and filmmaker	10th Evicted	
Carmen Lomana	Jet set and businesswoman	9th Evicted	
María Castro	Actress	8th Evicted	
Óscar Higares	Former bullfighter	7th Evicted	
Jaime Nava	Rugbyer	6th Evicted	
Iván Massagué	Actor	4th Evicted	
Dafne Fernández	Actress and dancer	3rd Evicted	
Xuso Jones	Singer-songwriter	2nd Evicted	
Paula Prendes	TV host and actress	1st Evicted	

=== Follow-up chart ===
No.	Contestants	1st program	2nd program	3rd program	4th program	5th program	6th program	7th program	8th program	9th program	10th program	11th program
1	Ona											
2	Paz											
3	Mario											
4	Antonia											
5	Boris											
6	Santiago											
7	Carmen											
8	María											
9	Óscar											
10	Jaime											
11	Iván											
12	Dafne											
13	Xuso											
14	Paula											

== Series 4 (2019) ==
Contestant	Occupation	Status	
Tamara Falcó	Aristocrat & fashion designer	Winner	
Félix Gómez	Al salir de clase actor	Runner-up	
Vicky Martín Berrocal	Fashion businesswoman	3rd Place	
Boris Izaguirre	Writer and TV host, S3 contestant	Finalist	Exempt
Yolanda Ramos	Comedian and actress	13th Evicted	
Juan Avellaneda	Fashion designer	12th Evicted	
Anabel Alonso	Actress & comedian, S2 contestant	11th Evicted	Exempt
Ana Obregón	TV host and actress	10th Evicted	1st Evicted
Ana Milán	Actress	9th Evicted	
Almudena Cid	Former rhythmic gymnast	8th Evicted	
Álex Adróver	Yo soy Bea actor	7th Evicted	
José Salazar	Los Chunguitos singer	Quit	
Juan Salazar	Los Chunguitos singer	6th Evicted	
Elena Furiase	Actress	5th Evicted	
Marta Torné	TV host and actress	4th Evicted	
El Sevilla	Mojinos Escozíos vocalist	3rd Evicted	
José Miguel Antúnez	Former basketballer	2nd Evicted	

=== Follow-up chart ===
No.	Contestants	1st program	2nd program	3rd program	4th program	5th program	6th program	7th program	8th program	9th program	10th program	11th program	12th program
1	Tamara												
2	Félix												
3	Vicky												
4	Boris												
5	Yolanda												
6	Avellaneda												
7	Anabel												
8	Ana O.												
9	Ana M.												
10	Almudena												
11	Álex												
12	José												
13	Juan												
14	Elena												
15	Marta												
16	El Sevilla												
17	Antúnez												

== Series 5 (2020) ==
Contestant	Occupation	Status	
Raquel Meroño	Actress & businesswoman	Winner	
Florentino Fernández, "Flo"	Comedian	Runner-up	
Josie	Stylist & fashion journalist	3rd Place	
Ainhoa Arteta	Soprano	4th Place	
Nicolás Coronado	Actor and model	5th Place	
La Terremoto de Alcorcón	Singer	12th Evicted	
Celia Villalobos	Former Health Minister	11th Evicted	
Gonzalo Miró	Sportscaster	10th Evicted	
Lucía Dominguín Bosé	Businesswoman & TV personality	9th Evicted	6th Evicted
Juan José Ballesta	Actor	8th Evicted	
Laura Sánchez	Model and actress	7th Evicted	
Pedro "Perico" Delgado	Former cyclist & sportscaster	5th Evicted	
Raquel Sánchez Silva	TV host and writer	4th Evicted	
Jesús Castro	Actor	3rd Evicted	
Melani Olivares	Aída actress	2nd Evicted	
David Fernández	Comedian and actor	1st Evicted	
Willy Bárcenas	Taburete vocalist	Not chosen	

=== Follow-up chart ===
No.	Contestants	1st program	2nd program	3rd program	4th program	5th program	6th program	7th program	8th program	9th program	10th program	11th program	12th program
1	Raquel M.												
2	Flo												
3	Josie												
4	Ainhoa												
5	Nicolás												
6	La Terre												
7	Celia												
8	Gonzalo												
9	Lucía												
10	Juanjo												
11	Laura												
12	Perico												
13	Raquel S.												
14	Jesús												
15	Melani												
16	David												

== Series 6 (2021) ==
Contestant	Occupation	Status	
Juanma Castaño	Radio host & sportscaster	Winner	
Miki Nadal	Comedian and TV host	Winner	7th Evicted
David Bustamante	Singer-songwriter	3rd Place	
Belén López	Amar es para siempre actress	Finalist	
Carmina Barrios	Carmina o revienta actress	12th Evicted	
Verónica Forqué	Actress	Quit	
Iván Sánchez	Actor and model	11th Evicted	
Arkano	Freestyle rapper	10th Evicted	
Eduardo Navarrete	Fashion designer	9th Evicted	
Victoria Abril	Actress	8th Evicted	
Terelu	TV host and panelist	6th Evicted	
Julian Iantzi	TV host	5th Evicted	
Yotuel	Orishas singer & UPA actor	4th Evicted	
Vanesa Romero	Actress and model	3rd Evicted	
Samantha Hudson	Internet personality	2nd Evicted	
Tamara	Singer	1st Evicted	
Esperanza Aguirre	Former minister and Senate/CAM president	Not chosen	

=== Follow-up chart ===
No.	Contestants	1st program	2nd program	3rd program	4th program	5th program	6th program	7th program	8th program	9th program	10th program	11th program	12th program
1	Juanma												
1	Miki												
3	Bustamante												
4	Belén												
5	Carmina												
6	Verónica												
7	Iván												
8	Arkano												
9	Eduardo												
10	Victoria												
11	Terelu												
12	Julian												
13	Yotuel												
14	Vanesa												
15	Samantha												
16	Tamara												

== Series 7 (2022) ==
Contestant	Occupation	Status	
Lorena Castell	Radio broadcaster & TV host	Winner	
Manu Baqueiro	Amar en tiempos revueltos actor	Runner-up	
María Escoté	Fashion designer	3rd Place	
Patricia Conde	TV host	Finalist	4th Evicted
Isabelle Junot	Aristocrat	12th Evicted	
Nico Abad	Sports TV host	11th Evicted	
Daniela Santiago	Veneno actress and model	10th Evicted	
Xavier Deltell	Actor and comedian	9th Evicted	
Pepe Barroso Silva	Model and actor	8th Evicted	
María Zurita	Businesswoman & aristocrat	7th Evicted	
Norma Duval	Vedette and TV host	6th Evicted	
Fernando Andina	Al salir de clase actor	5th Evicted	
Ruth Lorenzo	Singer-songwriter	3rd Evicted	
Eduardo Rosa	Actor	2nd Evicted	
Emmanuel Esparza	Mentiras perfectas actor	1st Evicted	
Cristina Cifuentes	Former President of the Community of Madrid	Not chosen	
Nil Ojeda	YouTuber	Not chosen	

=== Follow-up chart ===
No.	Contestants	1st program	2nd program	3rd program	4th program	5th program	6th program	7th program	8th program	9th program	10th program	11th program	12th program
1	Lorena												
2	Manu												
3	María E.												
4	Patricia												
5	Isabelle												
6	Nico												
7	Daniela												
8	Xavier												
9	Pepe												
10	María Z.												
11	Norma												
12	Fernando												
13	Ruth												
14	Eduardo												
15	Emmanuel												

== Series 8 (2023) ==
Contestant	Occupation	Status	
Laura Londoño	Café con aroma de mujer actress	Winner	
Álvaro Muñoz Escassi	Polo player and horseman	Runner-up	
Daniel Illescas	Model and influencer	3rd Place	
Toñi Moreno	TV host	Finalist	
Blanca Romero	Actress and model	12th Evicted	
Jesulín de Ubrique	Former bullfighter	11th Evicted	
Jorge Cadaval	Los Morancos comedian	10th Evicted	
Miguel Diosdado	Acacias 38 actor	9th Evicted	5th Evicted
Eduardo Casanova	Actor and filmmaker	8th Evicted	
Jorge Sanz	Actor	7th Evicted	
Tania Llasera	TV host	6th Evicted	
Palito Dominguín Bosé	Model & TV personality	4th Evicted	
Sandra Gago	Model	3rd Evicted	
César Cadaval	Los Morancos comedian	2nd Evicted	
Genoveva Casanova	Aristocrat	1st Evicted	

=== Follow-up chart ===
No.	Contestants	1st program	2nd program	3rd program	4th program	5th program	6th program	7th program	8th program	9th program	10th program	11th program	12th program
1	Laura												
2	Álvaro												
3	Daniel												
4	Toñi												
5	Blanca												
6	Jesulín												
7	Jorge C.												
8	Miguel												
9	Eduardo												
10	Jorge S.												
11	Tania												
12	Palito												
13	Sandra												
14	César												
15	Genoveva												

== Series 9 (2024) ==
Contestant	Occupation	Status	
Inés Hernand	Media personality	Winner	
Marina Rivers	Influencer	Runner-up	
Pitingo	Singer-songwriter	3rd Place	
Francis Lorenzo	Actor	Finalist	
Pocholo Martínez-Bordiú	Aristocrat and media personality	13th Evicted	
Cristina Cifuentes	Former President of the Community of Madrid	12th Evicted	4th Evicted
Hiba Abouk	Actress	11th Evicted	
José Lamuño	Actor	10th Evicted	1st Evicted
Raúl Gómez	TV host and comedian	9th Evicted	
Itziar Miranda	Actress and writer	8th Evicted	
Pelayo Díaz	Designer, blogger & TV personality	7th Evicted	
María León	Actress	6th Evicted	
Topacio Fresh	Gallery owner and artist	5th Evicted	
Rubén Ochandiano	Actor	Quit	
Nerea Garmendia	Actress	3rd Evicted	
Juan Luis Cano	Gomaespuma broadcaster and writer	2nd Evicted	

=== Follow-up chart ===
No.	Contestants	1st program	2nd program	3rd program	4th program	5th program	6th program	7th program	8th program	9th program	10th program	11th program	12th program
	Cristina												
	Francis												
	Hiba												
	Inés												
	Itziar												
	José												
	Juan Luis												
	María												
	Marina												
	Nerea												
	Pelayo												
	Pitingo												
	Pocholo												
	Raúl												
	Rubén												
	Topacio												

== Series 10 (2025) ==
Contestant	Occupation	Status	
Mariló Montero	TV host	Winner	
Miguel Torres	Former footballer	Runner-up	
Juanjo Bona	Singer	3rd Place	
Quique Jiménez "Torito"	TV host	Finalist	
José Manuel Parada	TV host	13th Evicted	
Valeria Ros	Comedian	12th Evicted	
Mala Rodríguez	Rapper	11th Evicted	
Soraya Arnelas	Singer	10th Evicted	2nd Evicted
Alejo Sauras	Actor	9th Evicted	
Rosa Benito	TV personality	8th Evicted	
David Amor	Comedian	7th Evicted	
Masi Rodríguez	Influencer	6th Evicted	
Jorge Luengo	Magician	5th Evicted	
Valeria Vegas	Journalist	4th Evicted	
Charo Reina	Folkloric	3rd Evicted	
Necko Vidal	Musician	1st Evicted	

=== Follow-up chart ===
No.	Contestants	1st program	2nd program	3rd program	4th program	5th program	6th program	7th program	8th program	9th program	10th program	11th program	12th program
	Mariló												
	Miguel												
	Juanjo												
	Torito												
	Parada												
	Valeria R.												
	Mala												
	Soraya												
	Alejo												
	Rosa												
	David												
	Masi												
	Jorge												
	Valeria V.												
	Charo												
	Necko												

== Ratings ==
Colour key (nominal):
– Highest rating during the season
– Lowest rating during the season

Celebrity MasterChef Spain: Season 1 consolidated viewership and adjusted position
Episode	Original airdate	Timeslot	Viewers (millions)	Share (%)	Night rank	Source
1	6 November 2016		3.27	21.0%	#1	
2	8 November 2016		2.88	21.0%	#2	
3	15 November 2016		3.32	24.1%	#1	
4	22 November 2016		3.22	23.0%	#1	
5	29 November 2016		3.50	24.8%	#1	
6	13 December 2016		3.50	28.2%	#1	

Celebrity MasterChef Spain: Season 2 consolidated viewership and adjusted position
Episode	Original airdate	Timeslot	Viewers (millions)	Share (%)	Night rank	Source
1	19 September 2017				#1	
2	26 September 2017				#1	
3	3 October 2017				#1	
4	10 October 2017				#1	
5	17 October 2017				#1	
6	24 October 2017				#1	
7	31 October 2017				#1	
8	7 November 2017				#1	
9	14 November 2017				#1	
10	21 November 2017				#1	

Celebrity MasterChef Spain: Season 3 consolidated viewership and adjusted position
Episode	Original airdate	Timeslot	Viewers (millions)	Share (%)	Night rank	Source
1	9 September 2018		3.05	16.0%		
2	16 September 2018		3.19	18.6%		
3	23 September 2018		2.90	17.1%		
4	30 September 2018		3.03	17.1%		
5	7 October 2018		3.36	19.5%		
6	14 October 2018		2.96	17.5%		
7	21 October 2018		3.10	17.9%		
8	28 October 2018		3.00	17.2%		
9	4 November 2018		3.16	19.0%		
10	11 November 2018		2.80	17.9%		
11	25 November 2018		3.20	18.5%		

Celebrity MasterChef Spain: Season 4 consolidated viewership and adjusted position
Episode	Original airdate	Timeslot	Viewers (millions)	Share (%)	Night rank	Source
1	11 September 2019		2.72	15.5%		
2	18 September 2019		2.73	16.9%		
3	25 September 2019		2.74	16.7%		
4	2 October 2019		2.87	17.8%		
5	9 October 2019		2.99	18.4%		
6	16 October 2019		3.12	20.0%		
7	23 October 2019		3.04	18.8%		
8	30 October 2019		3.02	19.6%		
9	6 November 2019		3.04	18.0%		
10	13 November 2019		3.50	22.0%		
11	20 November 2019		3.12	22.4%		
12	27 November 2019		3.20	22.1%		

Celebrity MasterChef Spain: Season 5 consolidated viewership and adjusted position
Episode	Original airdate	Timeslot	Viewers (millions)	Share (%)	Night rank	Source
1	15 September 2020		2.36	16.7%		
2	22 September 2020		1.87	12.3%		
3	29 September 2020		2.02	16.3%		
4	6 October 2020		2.34	15.8%		
5	20 October 2020		2.51	16.1%		
6	27 October 2020		2.63	18.0%		
7	3 November 2020		2.28	15.0%		
8	10 November 2020		2.89	17.8%		
9	17 November 2020		2.50	16.0%		
10	24 November 2020		2.76	19.7%		
11	1 December 2020		2.41	17.2%		
12	8 December 2020		2.57	20.6%		

Celebrity MasterChef Spain: Season 6 consolidated viewership and adjusted position
Episode	Original airdate	Timeslot	Viewers (millions)	Share (%)	Night rank	Source
1	13 September 2021		2.54	16.8%		
2	20 September 2021		2.36	14.6%		
3	27 September 2021		2.39	14.4%		
4	4 October 2021		2.48	15.6%		
5	11 October 2021		2.31	14.7%		
6	18 October 2021		2.34	16.8%		
7	25 October 2021		2.69	20.8%		
8	1 November 2021		2.51	19.1%		
9	8 November 2021		2.53	19.8%		
10	15 November 2021		2.27	20.0%		
11	22 November 2021		2.74	23.1%		
12	29 November 2021		2.69	22.4%		

Celebrity MasterChef Spain: Season 7 consolidated viewership and adjusted position
Episode	Original airdate	Timeslot	Viewers (millions)	Share (%)	Night rank	Source
1	12 September 2022	Monday, 22:00h	1.49	15.4	#1	
2	19 September 2022	Monday, 22:00h	1.48	15.5	#1	
3	26 September 2022	Monday, 22:00h	1.41	14.4	#1	
4	3 October 2022	Monday, 22:00h	1.55	17.0	#1	
5	10 October 2022	Monday, 22:00h	1.47	15.6	#1	
6	17 October 2022	Monday, 22:00h	1.46	16.2	#1	
7	24 October 2022	Monday, 22:00h	1.35	14.6	#2	
8	31 October 2022	Monday, 22:00h	1.27	13.8	#1	
9	7 November 2022	Monday, 22:00h	1.48	15.0	#1	
10	14 November 2022	Monday, 22:00h	1.43	15.0	#1	
11	21 November 2022	Monday, 22:00h	1.51	16.0	#1	
12	28 November 2022	Monday, 22:00h	1.97	18.4	#1	
12	29 November 2022	Monday, 22:00h	2.02	15.4	#1	
