= Samantha Vallejo-Nágera =

Spanish chef (born 1969)

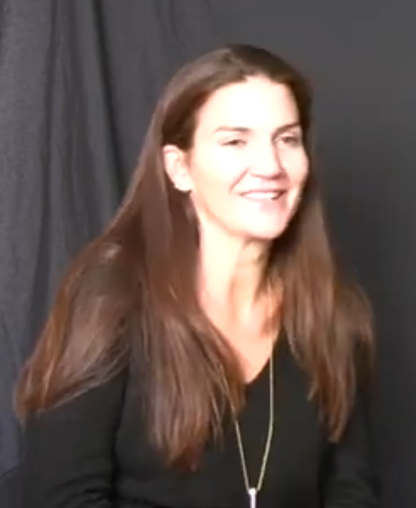
- In a 2014 interview
- Born: 27 October 1969 (age 56); Madrid, Spain
- Occupations: Chef and businessperson
- Father: José Ignacio Vallejo-Nágera Botas

Samantha Vallejo-Nágera Déroulède (born 27 October 1969) is a Spanish chef, television host and businessperson. She is best known for being a judge on Spanish MasterChef.

== Life and career ==
Vallejo-Nágera was born in Madrid to a well-known Spanish family close to the Franco regime; her grandfather Antonio Vallejo-Nájera was a psychiatrist with an interest in eugenics. She is the daughter of engineer José Ignacio Vallejo-Nágera Botas and niece of psychiatrist and university professor Juan Antonio Vallejo-Nágera Botas. She is the sister of Nicolás Vallejo-Nágera, better known as "Colate", and the first cousin of the writer María Vallejo-Nágera.

She began her culinary career studying and working with Spanish chef Carlos Horcher in the 1980s, then moved to London and New York. She started her catering company "Samantha de España" in London in 1990. In 1995 she trained in Lyon with French chef Paul Bocuse and Spanish chef Juan Mari Arzak.

She launched the restaurant Casa Taberna in Pedraza, where she spent her childhood summers. She won a Sol Repsol award in 2023 for the restaurant's authentic Segovian cuisine.

Since 2013, she has been a judge on the program MasterChef with Pepe Rodríguez and Jordi Cruz. She has written several cookbooks and hosts regular workshops and talks.

From 2013 to 2025, she was a judge on the MasterChef program, alongside Pepe Rodríguez Rey and Jordi Cruz Mas. She has written several cookbooks and regularly gives workshops and talks.

== Television ==
- MasterChef, (2013–present)
- MasterChef Junior, (2013–present)
- MasterChef Celebrity, (2016–present)
- Typical Spanish, (2020)
- MasterChef Abuelos, (2022) on TVE

== Works ==
- ¿Cenamos en casa?
- La cocina de Samantha Vallejo-Nágera (2011)
- Samantha Las recetas con chocolate
- Samantha y Roscon. Party.com (2016)
- Formula Samantha (2016)
