= Begoña Rodrigo =

Spanish chef and restaurateur (born 1975)

- Born: Begoña Rodrigo de Jorge; August 15, 1975 (age 50); Valencia, Spain
- Culinary career
- Cooking style: Spanish cuisine; Valencian cuisine; vegetable-led cooking
- Current restaurants: La Salita (Valencia); Nómada (Valencia); Nómada Urban Mood (Valencia); CookTL (Valencia)
- Television shows: Top Chef (2013), winner; La última cena (2020), judge
- Awards won: One Michelin star (2020); Three Repsol Suns (2024)

Begoña Rodrigo de Jorge (born 15 August 1975) is a Spanish chef and restaurateur based in Valencia. She is the owner and head chef of La Salita, a restaurant in the city's Ruzafa district that holds one Michelin star and three Suns in the Guía Repsol. A self-taught cook who trained entirely outside Spain, she came to national prominence in 2013 as the winner of the first season of the Spanish television cooking competition Top Chef.

Rodrigo is known for a vegetable-led cuisine rooted in the Valencian huerta, in which acidity is the unifying element: she produces her own vinegars, pickles and marinades and has developed a range of cured vegetable preparations that she calls a vegetable charcuterie. Her tasting menus are structured as Gaia, built around meat, Ondina, around fish and seafood, Cloris, entirely plant-based, and La Salita, which combines all three. In 2024 she became the first woman to direct the gastronomic programme of the Guadalajara International Book Fair in Mexico.

== Early life and training ==
Rodrigo was born in Valencia on 15 August 1975. (Note: Most sources, including the Spanish government and Rodrigo's own website, give Valencia as her birthplace. The gastronomy magazine Sobremesa gives Xirivella, in the Valencia metropolitan area.) She had no early vocation for cooking and instead showed an interest in business: she opened a bread shop as a teenager and, two years later, a second one with an attached café. She studied three years of industrial engineering at the Polytechnic University of Valencia before abandoning the degree, and in 1996 moved to the Netherlands.

Her first professional kitchen work was at the Amsterdam Marriott Hotel, where she began preparing breakfasts under the chef Nick Reade and later worked unpaid in the evenings in the hotel group's fine-dining restaurant. She subsequently moved to Utrecht to work at the restaurant of the Michelin-starred Hotel Karel V, and then to London, where she spent several years as head chef of the private club Aquarium. She returned to Spain about a decade after leaving, and worked briefly in other kitchens before opening her own restaurant.

== Career ==
=== La Salita ===
Rodrigo opened La Salita in Valencia in 2005, together with her then husband, the Dutch sommelier Jorne Buurmeijer. The restaurant was originally located on Calle Séneca, near the Mestalla Stadium. Shortly before the COVID-19 pandemic the restaurant moved to a listed mansion dating from 1866 in the Russafa district, a building with original Nolla tiling and hydraulic floors that also houses a garden terrace; Buurmeijer, from whom Rodrigo later separated, remained with the project as its sommelier.

The restaurant works almost exclusively with produce from local growers and offers several tasting menus, among them ovo-lacto vegetarian options. Its best-known dish is La Tiara, a tartare of pickles and salt-cured fish served in the shape of a tiara, which also illustrated the cover of Rodrigo's 2016 book.

=== Top Chef ===
In 2013 Rodrigo took part in the first season of Top Chef, broadcast by Antena 3 and hosted by Alberto Chicote, who judged the contest alongside Susi Díaz and Ángel León. She reached the final together with Antonio Arrabal and Miguel Cobo, and the closing gala, held at the Teatriz restaurant in Madrid, was judged by a panel of seven leading Spanish chefs including Juan Mari Arzak, Martín Berasategui, Joan Roca, Pedro Subijana, Quique Dacosta, Eneko Atxa and Karlos Arguiñano. Rodrigo won the title after eleven weeks of competition, together with a cash prize she said she reinvested in her restaurant. In the deciding round she cooked with the help of a returning contestant of her choice, Javier Estévez, presenting a menu that drew together the elements she had used across the series; she said afterwards that she had improvised and that she considered the verdict fair. The twelve episodes averaged 2,849,000 viewers and a 17.2 per cent audience share.

=== Michelin star and Repsol Suns ===
La Salita received its first Michelin star in the Michelin Guide Spain & Portugal 2020, one of twenty-three restaurants to be awarded a first star in that edition, which was presented at a gala in Seville in November 2019. The ceremony was held at the Teatro Lope de Vega, and with the new entries the guide's 2020 selection reached 194 one-star restaurants. Michelin inspectors described her cooking as creative and carefully presented, and the guide's Valencian round-up placed La Salita alongside El Poblet and Tula among the region's newly distinguished restaurants.

Rodrigo dedicated the award to her staff, noting that the team had grown from three people when the restaurant opened in 2005 to seventeen. She said the distinction had changed how the restaurant was perceived, in that it had stopped being known as the restaurant of the woman from television, and announced that she would take the opportunity to remove red meat from her menus. The restaurant reappeared among the starred entries of the 2021 edition following its change of premises.

On 4 March 2024 La Salita was awarded a third Sun in the Guía Repsol, the only restaurant to reach the guide's top category that year. The award was presented at the El Batel Auditorium and Conference Centre in Cartagena, at a ceremony in which ninety-eight new Suns were distributed. Reporting on the ceremony noted that the 2024 edition was marked by the prominence of women chefs, with the Sustainable Sun awards going to Fina Puigdevall and Martina Puigvert, Lucía Freitas and Irene López.

=== Other ventures ===
Rodrigo groups her hospitality businesses under the name Anarkía Group, a label she has said reflects her dislike of rules and her taste for irony, and which she acknowledged cost her some customers. Her second restaurant, Nómada, opened in the Bonaire shopping centre and revisits the international influences of her years abroad; a third venue, Nómada Urban Mood, opened in June 2019 in a space of more than 700 square metres on Calle Martínez Ferrando, next to Valencia's Columbus Market, with an all-day format combining breakfasts, a lunch menu, cocktails and takeaway service.

In July 2025 she opened CookTL, a cocktail bar on the ground floor of the mansion that houses La Salita, with a drinks list built in part around the restaurant's house-made vinegars.

=== Television ===
After winning Top Chef, Rodrigo appeared on Spanish television in several formats. She presented the programme Recetas por 5€ on the thematic channel Canal Cocina, and in 2018 was the subject of an episode of the Flooxer documentary series Yo, Chef.

In 2020 she joined the jury of the Telecinco celebrity cooking programme La última cena, initially alongside Sergi Arola. During a July 2020 broadcast she used an expression about the Roma that drew criticism on social media, and apologised on air, stating that she was not racist. For the programme's Christmas specials that December, Arola was replaced by Miguel Cobo, a fellow contestant from the first season of Top Chef, while Rodrigo remained on the panel.

=== Guadalajara Book Fair ===
In 2024 Rodrigo was appointed to lead the Gastronomic Festival of the Guadalajara International Book Fair, the largest Spanish-language book fair in the world, as part of Spain's participation as Guest of Honour Country. She was the first woman to hold the role in the fair's history. The appointment formed part of a programme built around the theme "Camino de ida y vuelta" and around gender equality, linguistic plurality and sustainability.

Rodrigo was responsible for the fair's opening meal, a dinner for more than 700 people, and for a menu served throughout the event at the Los Vitrales restaurant of the Hotel Barceló Guadalajara. The menu drew on dishes from northern, central and southern Spain, including gazpachos, tortilla de patatas, paella, pulpo a la gallega and baked rice, in an attempt to convey the regional character of Spanish cooking; she described working without her own kitchen, team and ingredients as the main difficulty. Of the appointment she said that being the first woman mattered because breaking such ceilings meant many more could follow. She proposed a dialogue between Spanish and Mexican cooking, and shared a discussion panel with Ferran Adrià on 1 December 2024. She has also served as ambassador for the Valencia Rice Denominación de Origen since September 2023. The 38th edition of the fair ran from 30 November to 8 December 2024.

== Cooking style ==
Rodrigo's cooking is based on the produce of the Valencian huerta and on the inland recipes of the Serranía region, worked through what she describes as taste memory. She offers four tasting menus, two of them ovo-lacto vegetarian, and describes herself as devoted to roots, vegetables, tubers and citrus fruit. Little-known roots and tubers such as mashua, crosne and jícama, as well as neglected varieties from the Valencian huerta, appear on a dedicated tasting board.

Acidity is the unifying thread of her menus. She produces her own vinegars through fermentation and pickling, using raspberry, pomegranate, tropical fruit, cardamom and organic apple, and displays them in demijohns at the entrance to the restaurant. In January 2024 she introduced a range of cured vegetable preparations, saying that she wanted to surprise diners with the textures and flavours of vegetables often dismissed for being overcooked.

== Advocacy ==
Rodrigo has spoken publicly about the position of women in haute cuisine and about working conditions in hospitality. As early as 2015 she argued that women cooks lacked visibility for cultural reasons, that Spain had no young female figurehead in the profession, and that low starting salaries and the difficulty of combining the job with family life pushed women out. She has noted the contrast between the high proportion of women in Spanish catering schools and the small share of Michelin-starred restaurants led by women, and has argued that expectations and unpaid domestic responsibilities, rather than ability, explain the gap. In November 2024 she took part in the Michelin Guide's "Mujer & Excelencia Culinaria" debate in Cartagena, alongside Carme Ruscalleda and María Gómez, where she said that around 70 per cent of catering-school students in Spain were women while senior positions remained held by men. Referring to the widely repeated account of her returning to work three days after giving birth, she said she found its popularity uncomfortable, arguing that as a business owner she should have had the same leave as her own employees.

She has also described the loss of talent caused by the lack of maternity provision in professional kitchens, and has criticised the different standards applied to men and women in the profession. Speaking before the 2025 Michelin gala, she said that after three decades in hospitality she considered that little had changed.

At La Salita she has restructured working patterns to establish regulated hours and protected time off, arguing that the profession requires regulation and professionalisation, and that the emotional wellbeing of the team is a condition for maintaining standards. She set out this position in a 2023 masterclass on mental health in hospitality.

== Awards and recognition ==
In 2014 Rodrigo was named Cook of the Year by the Academy of Gastronomy of the Valencian Community. The same year La Salita received its first Repsol Sun.

In October 2023 she was named second-best female vegetable chef in the world by the We're Smart Green Guide, behind the Japanese chef Keiko Kuwakino, which made her the best female vegetable chef in Europe. The awards were presented at the Vaudeville Theatre in Brussels. At the same ceremony La Salita received five radishes and entered the guide's Top 100 at number sixteen, the highest-placed Spanish restaurant, and was given the We're Smart Discovery Award for Spain. On receiving the award she noted that the restaurant had introduced its first vegetarian menu fifteen years earlier. The Best Vegetable Lady Chef category had been created that year to recognise women chefs who make their menus as plant-based as possible.

In December 2021 Valencia City Council included Rodrigo in the Paseo de las Estrellas, a walkway in the main aisle of the Central Market honouring the city's Michelin-starred chefs, alongside Loles Salvador, honoured posthumously, Ricard Camarena, Juan Carlos Galbis, Óscar Torrijos, Vicente Aleixandre, Alejandro del Toro, Jorge Andrés, Bernd Knöller, Luis Valls and Miguel Ángel Mayor. The walkway was inaugurated the week the city hosted the gala of the 2022 Michelin Guide for Spain and Portugal.

== Personal life ==
Rodrigo met the Dutch sommelier Jorne Buurmeijer during her years in the Netherlands, and the couple opened La Salita together in Valencia. They separated in 2017 but continued to work together, with Buurmeijer remaining in charge of the dining room and the wine list. They have a son, who grew up around the restaurant. Rodrigo has spoken publicly about the difficulty of combining motherhood with running a restaurant.
