= Luengo =

Luengo is a Spanish surname. Notable people with the surname include:

- Antton Luengo (born 1981), Spanish cyclist
- Beatriz Luengo (born 1982), Spanish singer-songwriter and actress
- Iván Luengo (born 2003), Spanish actor
- Jorge Luengo (born 1984), Spanish magician
- José María Luengo Martínez (1896–1991), Spanish writer and archaeologist
- Maider Luengo (born 1980), Spanish field hockey player
- Maria Teresa Luengo (born 1940), Argentine classical composer and musicologist
- Víctor Luengo (born 1974), Spanish basketball player
- Victoria "Vicky" Luengo (born 1990), Spanish actress
