= Top Chef (Spanish TV series) =

Spanish television program

- Also known as: Top Chef Spain; Top Chef España
- Genre: Cooking; Reality
- Directed by: Javier Llanos; Ángel Rodríguez
- Presented by: Alberto Chicote
- Judges: Alberto Chicote; Susi Díaz; Paco Roncero (season 3-4); Ángel León (season 1); Yayo Daporta (season 2)
- Country of origin: Spain
- Original language: Castilian Spanish
- No. of seasons: 4
- No. of episodes: 55

Production
- Production location: Madrid
- Running time: 90 minutes approx.
- Production companies: Boomerang TV; Atresmedia

Original release
- Network: Antena 3
- Release: October 2, 2013 – May 17, 2017

Related
- MasterChef Spain

Top Chef, also known as Top Chef Spain or Top Chef España, is a Spanish television show based on the American format of the same name. The base of the program is a cooking competition that features chefs competing for the title of best chef in the country. Atresmedia produces the show for its main channel Antena 3 in association with production company Boomerang TV.

== History ==
In January 2013, Atresmedia confirmed it had bought the rights to adapt the Top Chef format in Spain, which rival group Mediaset España had previously discarded producing for its channel Cuatro. As the details of the adaptation were revealed, the show was initially meant to air on Atresmedia's second channel laSexta, which at the time had the success of Pesadilla en la cocina (the Spanish adaptation of the Kitchen Nightmares franchise) to its credit. However, after seeing the success of similar format MasterChef on public channel La 1, Atresmedia decided to air Top Chef on its main channel Antena 3 instead. The first season premiered on October 2, 2013.

== Format ==
Top Chef searches for the best professional cook in the country, who will get a cash money prize and supplies for his or her restaurant. In order to become the "top chef", contestants must face weekly challenges on each episode:

- Trial by fire: A quick challenge where the contestants must prove their skills to work against the clock. The winner gets immunity and/or privileges for the next challenge.
- Team challenge: The contestants are thrown into teams for an outdoor task where they will cook for a collective whose votes will decide the winning team.
- Last chance: The members of the losing team in the previous task face each other with the judges of the show deciding who cooked the best plate. The loser of this challenge gets eliminated from the competition.

== First season (2013) ==
The first season ran from October 2 to December 18, 2013, and featured chefs Alberto Chicote, Ángel León and Susi Díaz as judges. On week 9 the eliminated contestants returned for a repechage challenge where the chefs still in contention served as judges. The special panel of judges for the finale featured Pedro Subijana, Martín Berasategui, Joan Roca, Quique Dacosta, Eneko Atxa, Juan Mari Arzak and Karlos Arguiñano.

=== Contestants ===
Chefs	Age	Origin	Occupation	Ranking
Begoña Rodrigo	37	Xirivella	La Salita restaurant owner and chef	Winner
Antonio Arrabal	32	Zaragoza	Abba Burgos hotel executive chef	Runner-up
Miguel Cobo	29	Santander	El Vallés rest. co-owner and executive chef	3rd classified
Jesús Almagro	40	Madrid	Pedro Larumbe rest. executive chef	4th / 9th evicted
Javier Estévez	30	Madrid	El Mesón de Doña Filo rest. executive chef	8th evicted
Bárbara Amorós	43	Valencia	Bárbara te cocina catering owner and chef	7th evicted
Antonio Canales	35	Tarragona	Grupo Fuente Pizarro executive chef	6th evicted
Elisabeth Julianne	33	Menorca	Ars Café rest. executive chef	5th evicted
Borja Letamendía	45	San Sebastián	Borja Letamendía Catering owner and chef	3rd evicted
Hung Fai	40	Hong Kong	Igeretxe hotel executive chef	2nd evicted
Iván Hernández	22	Ávila	El Rondón rest. manager chef	1st evicted
Eduardo Sánchez	48	Madrid	Ministry of Defence Head of Hostelry	Final casting eliminated
Enrique Lozano	63	Sevilla	Alfonso XIII hotel former executive chef	Final casting eliminated
Erika Domínguez	28	A Coruña	La Solana rest. sous-chef	Final casting eliminated
Vicente Cubertorer	25	Castellón	MotoGP kitchen manager	Final casting eliminated

=== Weekly stats chart ===
	P. 01	P. 02	P. 03	P. 04	P. 05	P. 06	P. 07	P. 08	P. 09	P. 10	Semifinal	Final	
Begoña	C	S	UO	UO	S	UO	S	S	J	UO	UO	F	Winner
Arrabal	C	UO	S	S	S	UO	UO	S	J	UO	S	F	Runner-up
Miguel	C	UO	UO	UO	UO	I	S	S	J	UO	S	E	SC
Jesús	C	UO	S	S	E				R	S	E		
Javier	C	S	S	I	S	S	UO	UO	J	E			SC
Bárbara	C	UO	S	UO	UO	S	S	E					
Canales	C	S	I	S	UO	S	E						
Elisabeth	C	S	UO	S	S	E							
Borja	C	S	UO	E									
Hung Fai	C	I	E										
Iván	C	E											
Eduardo	NC												
Enrique	NC												
Erika	NC												
Vicente	NC												

== Second season (2014) ==
The second season premiered on September 8, 2014, and ended on December 17, 2014. Alberto Chicote and Susi Díaz returned as judges, with Yayo Daporta replacing Ángel León. On week 2 the contestants dropped on the final castings (week 1) were given another chance to earn a place on the competition against the losers of the week's team challenge, and featured again the repechage challenge, that took place on week 11. The special panel of judges for the finale featured Martín Berasategui, Pedro Larumbe, Andoni Luis Adúriz, Carles Gaig, Toño Pérez, Francis Paniego and Ángel León.

Due to an agreement with McDonald's, this season also featured a "burger challenge", which was won by Javier García Peña. As a result, his creation would be commercialized for a limited time in the Spanish McDonald's restaurants as the Grand McExtrem Top Chef.

=== Contestants ===
Chefs	Age	Origin	Occupation	Ranking
David García	26	El Palá de Torroella	Grupo TO [+] owner and executive chef	Winner
Marc Joli	37	Girona	Cal Músic tabern co-owner and executive chef	Runner-up
Fran Vicente	27	Salamanca	Coque restaurant executive chef	7th evicted / Semifinalist
Víctor Rodrigo	32	Castellón	Samsha rest. co-owner and executive chef	11th evicted
Javier García "Peña"	34	Valladolid	La Candela gastro-bar co-owner and executive chef	10th evicted
Carlos Medina	30	Valencia	André rest. creative director	9th evicted
Inés Abril	34	Vigo	Maruja Limón rest. chef	8th evicted
Marta Roselló	27	Colònia de Sant Jordi	Sal de Coco rest. owner and executive chef	6th evicted
Honorato Espinar	49	Palma	Iberostar Hotels & Resorts Head of Logistics	F. c. eliminated / 5th evicted
Rebeca Hernández	36	Madrid	La Berenjena gastro-tavern co-owner and executive chef	4th evicted
Teresa Gutiérrez	34	Villarrobledo	Azafrán rest. owner and executive chef	3rd evicted
Pablo González	30	Sevilla	Ars Natura rest. executive chef	2nd evicted
Joaquín Espejo	34	Las Palmas	Moorea rest. owner and executive chef	1st evicted
Francisco Jerez	43	Santander	Las Carolinas hotel-school teacher	Final casting eliminated
Irina C. Herrera	49	Catacaos	Gastronomic teacher and consultant	Final casting eliminated
Pedro Jerez	43	Santander	Novecento rest. chef	Final casting eliminated

=== Weekly stats chart ===
	P. 01	P. 02	P. 03	P. 04	P. 05	P. 06	P. 07	P. 08	P. 09	P. 10	P. 11	P. 12	P. 13	Semifinal	Final
David	C	S	I	UO	S	UO	UO	I	UO	UO	J	S	S	S	Winner
Marc	C	S	UO	UO	UO	UO	UO	S	S	I	J	UO	UO	UO	Runner-up
Fran	C	I	S	UO	S	I	S	E			R	I	UO	E	
Víctor	C	UO	S	UO	UO	S	S	S	I	S	J	S	E		SC
Peña	C	S	UO	S	S	S	I	S	S	UO	J	E			
Carlos	C	UO	UO	I	UO	S	S	S	UO	E					
Inés	C	S	S	S	S	UO	S	UO	E						SC
Marta	C	S	S	S	S	S	E								SC
Honorato	NC	R	S	S	UO	E									
Rebeca	C	S	S	S	E										
Teresa	C	UO	S	E											SC
Pablo	C	S	E												
Joaquín	C	E													
Francisco	NC														
Irina	NC														
Pedro	NC														

== Third season (2015) ==
The third season ran from September 9 to December 16, 2015. Alberto Chicote and Susi Díaz continued as judges, while Paco Roncero replaced Yayo Daporta.

=== Contestants ===
Chefs	Age	Origin	Occupation	Ranking
Marcel Ress	26	Mellrichstadt	Simply Fosh restaurant executive chef	9th evicted / Winner
Alejandro Platero	32	Valencia	Macel.lum and Come & Calla rests. executive chef	Runner-up
Mari Paz Marlo	40	Cuenca	Marlo rests. owner and executive chef	Semifinalist
Sergio Bastard	36	Santander	La Casona del Judío rest. chef and co-owner	11th evicted
Oriol Lomas	26	Girona	Bocca Regencós rest. owner and executive chef	10th evicted
Luca Rodi	38	Italy	Dabbawala rest. and Quilicuá catering executive chef and owner	8th evicted
Montse Estruch	57	Vacarisses	El Cingle de Vacarisses rest. owner and chef	7th evicted
Álex Clavijo	31	Guayaquil	Vadebacus rest. executive chef	6th evicted
Carlos Caballero	37	Málaga	José Carlos García rest. R+D	5th evicted
María Espín	39	Barcelona	Hotel Melia Barcelona Sky executive chef	4th evicted
Julio Velandrino	31	Murcia	Back Pack executive chef, gastronomic adviser and teacher	3rd evicted
Carlota Bonder	27	Ibiza	Bonder & Co. catering manager and private chef	2nd evicted
Jesús Vega	49	Madrid	Hotel Ritz departure manager	1st evicted
Iván Serrano	23	Torrico	Tierra del Hotel Valdepalacios rest. sous-chef	Final casting eliminated
Borja Aldea	23	La Granja	Etxanobe rest. R+D head	Final casting eliminated
Vanessa Merino	37	Girona	Les Magnòlies rest. sous-chef	Final casting eliminated

=== Weekly stats chart ===
	P. 01	P. 02	P. 03	P. 04	P. 05	P. 06	P. 07	P. 08	P. 09	P. 10	P. 11	P. 12	P. 13	Semifinal	Final
Marcel	C	UO	S	UO	UO	S	I	UO	S	S	S	-	S	S	Winner
Alejandro	C	S	UO	S	S	UO	S	S	I	S	UO	-	UO	UO	Runner-up
Maripaz	C	S	S	S	S	UO	S	UO	S	UO	S	SF		E	SC
Sergio	C	UO	UO	S	S	UO	UO	S	UO	UO	I	-	E		SC
Oriol	C	S	UO	S	UO	S	S	I	UO	UO	E				
Luca	C	S	S	S	S	I	S	S	E						
Montse	C	I	S	UO	UO	S	UO	E							
Álex	C	S	S	S	UO	S	E								SC
Carlos	C	S	S	S	S	E									
María	C	UO	S	I	E										
Velandrino	C	S	S	E											SC
Carlota	C	S	E												
Jesús	C	E													
Iván	NC														
Borja	NC														
Vanessa	NC														

Note: Episode 12 featured a non-elimination challenge, with the winner qualifying for the semifinals.

== Fourth season (2017) ==
This season ran from February 15 to May 17, 2017. The panel of judges from season 3 (Chicote, Díaz and Roncero) returned unchanged for this season.

=== Contestants ===
Chefs	Age	Origin	Occupation	Ranking
Rakel Cernicharo	32	Valencia	Karak restaurant owner and executive chef	Winner
Víctor Gutiérrez	48	Amazonas	Víctor Gutiérrez rest. owner and executive chef	Runner-up
Pablo Montoro	38	Elda	Private chef	Semifinalist
Melissa Herrera	31	Granada	Del Mar rest. executive chef	4th and 10th evicted
Richard Alcayde	36	Málaga	Grupo La Pesquera gastronomic director	9th evicted
David Marcano	39	Madrid	Marcano rest. owner and executive chef	8th evicted
Federico Filippetti	44	Santa Fe	Haiku rest. owner and chef	7th evicted
Manu Núñez	32	A Coruña	Arume rest. co-owner and chef	6th evicted
María Rosa García	56	León	Ars Vivendi rest. owner and executive chef	5th evicted
Julio Miralles	43	Madrid	Grupo Pradal executive chef	3rd evicted
Tomás López	34	Orihuela	Domgim rest. executive chef	2nd evicted
Eva de Gil	23	Barcelona	Cotton House Hotel rest. executive chef	1st evicted
Fátima Pérez	56	Comillas	La atrevida rest. owner and chef	Final casting eliminated
Xavier Viamonte	23	Calella	La Tapa Teka rest. owner and chef	Final casting eliminated

=== Weekly stats chart ===
	P. 01	P. 02	P. 03	P. 04	P. 05	P. 06	P. 07	P. 08	P. 09	P. 10	P. 11	Semifinal	Final
Rakel	C	UO	UO	S	I	UO	UO	S	I	UO	UO	S	Winner
Víctor	C	S	I	S	UO	S	UO	UO	S	UO	S	UO	Runner-up
Montoro	C	I	UO	I	S	S	UO	UO	S	S	S	E	SC
Melissa	C	S	S	UO	E		R	UO	UO	UO	E		
Richard	C	S	UO	UO	S	UO	UO	S	UO	E			SC
Marcano	C	S	S	S	UO	S	UO	I	E				SC
Filippetti	C	S	S	UO	S	S	UO	E					
Manu	C	UO	S	S	UO	UO	E						SC
M.ª Rosa	C	S	S	I	S	E							
Julio	C	UO	UO	E									
Tomás	C	UO	E										
Eva	C	E											
Fátima	NC												
Xavi	NC												
