= Juan Avellaneda =

Spanish fashion designer and businessman

- Born: Alicante, Spain

Juan Avellaneda is a Spanish fashion designer, businessman and stylist.

== Early life and education ==
Juan Avellaneda was born in Alicante, Spain. He studied Business Administration and Management at the Open University of Catalonia and Creative Management at the London College of Fashion.

== Career ==
After completing his studies, Avellaneda moved to Barcelona to start his career as a fashion designer. He worked for Zara and Mango, before launching his eponymous brand in 2012.

In 2014, he founded the Avellaneda men's fashion brand. He is also the editor-in-chief of the La Garçonnière store and blog. In 2018, he published his first book, "Poténciate".

=== Television appearances ===
Since 2017, he has appeared as a fashion judge and commentator on the television programs "Cámbiame", "MasterChef Celebrity", and "Operación Triunfo".

In 2019, he competed on the fourth season of the Spanish spin-off of the cooking-reality show MasterChef Celebrity, where he lasted for 10 programmes.
