= El Cid: The Legend =

- Theatrical release poster
- Spanish: El Cid, la leyenda
- Directed by: José Pozo
- Written by: José Pozo
- Produced by: Julio Fernández
- Starring: Manel Fuentes; Natalia Verbeke; Loles León; Sancho Gracia; Carlos Latre; M.A. Rodríguez "El Sevilla"
- Cinematography: Adrià García; Víctor Maldonado
- Edited by: Félix Bueno
- Music by: Óscar Araujo; Zacarías M. de la Riva
- Distributed by: Filmax
- Release date: 19 December 2003
- Running time: 90 minutes
- Country: Spain
- Language: Spanish

El Cid: The Legend (Spanish: El Cid, la leyenda) is a 2003 Spanish animated film written and directed by José Pozo. It is based on the story of the 11th-century Castilian knight and warlord Rodrigo Díaz de Vivar, better known as El Cid.

== Plot ==
Ben Yusuf invades the Muslim Taifa of Zaragoza, as the beginning of his campaign to conquer the entire Iberian Peninsula. As a result, prince Al-Mu'tamin flees to Castile to warn King Ferdinand of Yusuf's invasion.

In Castile, Rodrigo Díaz de Vivar is living a life of privilege as the son of the commander of Ferdinand's forces, Don Diego Laínez de Vivar. He is best friends with the future king of Castile prince Sancho and is secretly in a romantic relationship with Jimena, the daughter of count Gormaz, who succeeds Don Diego as commander. Unfortunately, Gormaz disapproves, and suggests that Jimena should marry the arrogant and self-centered count Ordoñez. As the royal court receives word that the Almoravids of Zaragoza have crossed the Castilian border, Rodrigo gets the opportunity to accompany Sancho, Ordoñez and Gormaz on a scouting mission near the border to Zaragoza. Once they set up camp, Gormaz is ambushed by Al-Mu'tamin and his warriors, but Rodrigo intervenes. Once Al-Mu'tamin gets the chance to speak, he is allowed by Sancho to accompany them back to Castile.

Sometime later, king Ferdinand dies, and the devious and power-hungry princess Urraca plots to have Sancho killed so that the weak-minded prince Alfonso can be crowned. Gormaz meets with Rodrigo on a balcony, on Jimena's request, where Rodrigo asks for her hand in marriage. Gormaz, believing that Rodrigo will replace him as commander, refuses, and instead challenges Rodrigo to a duel. Rodrigo is hesitant to fight, but when Gormaz insists, he relents. As the two fight, Urraca sends out her lover and servant to assassinate Sancho by stabbing him in the back with a dagger. At the same time, Rodrigo accidentally kills Gormaz. When Jimena witnesses this, she becomes distraught and drives Rodrigo away. Later, Alfonso is crowned king, but at the ceremony Rodrigo refuses to kneel before him, and makes Alfonso swear that he had nothing to do with his brother's death. Alfonso does so, but in his rage and humiliation, he banishes Rodrigo without honor.

Rodrigo flees to Zaragoza, where his friends Álvar Fáñez and Garcés, along with Al-Mu'tamin, reunite with him. At Al-Mu'tamin's suggestion, the four men decide to reclaim the castle of his father, Emir Al-Muqtadir of Zaragoza. With the help of Garces' adopted badger, Ruidoso, Rodrigo and his friends manage to infiltrate the castle and liberate Al-Muqtadir along with other enslaved Muslims of Zaragoza. Rodrigo is appointed commander of Al-Muqtadir's forces, and begins to reclaim the castles and lands that had been seized by Yusuf in the name of king Alfonso, as an attempt to regain his lost honor. Rodrigo becomes known as El Cid among the Muslims.

Soon Rodrigo receives a letter from king Alfonso requesting his help. He returns to Castile alone to face the king. Once there, Alfonso informs him that Yusuf has gathered his army in northern Spain, and offers to pardon Rodrigo if he agrees to aid him. Rodrigo objects, claiming that Yusuf intends to seize Valencia. Furious with Rodrigo's defiance, Alfonso orders him imprisoned. Later, Urraca enters Rodrigo's cell and attempts to seduce him, but he resists. She then gives him the same dagger that was used to murder Sancho and releases him, on the condition that he kills Alfonso. Rodrigo enters Alfonso's chamber and, instead of killing him, he displays the dagger and reveals that Urraca orchestrated Sancho's death. Intimidated, Alfonso allows Rodrigo to escape. Rodrigo stops by Jimena's room, but she rejects him, still believing that Rodrigo murdered her father for disapproving of their relationship. Disheartened, Rodrigo escapes Castile.

Alfonso summons Don Diego to court, demanding to know if he had freed Rodrigo. Diego denies it, claiming that he had met with Alfonso at the time when Rodrigo escaped. Now certain that Urraca had freed Rodrigo and orchestrated Sancho's death, Alfonso has Urraca arrested and prepares to join Rodrigo and his forces. Meanwhile, Jimena has a change of heart and follows Rodrigo to Valencia. However, Ordoñez pursues her, and soon both of them are captured by emir Al-Qadir, Yusuf's ally.

Rodrigo and his friends infiltrate Yusuf's castle in Zaragoza, hoping to open the gates and allow Rodrigo's troops to besiege the castle. The plan goes awry, and Rodrigo is forced to surrender after Yusuf threatens Jimena. Soon however, Rodrigo and his friends escape imprisonment and Garcés opens the castle gates. Rodrigo's forces, led by Al-Mu'tamin, besiege the castle but are soon overrun by Yusuf's gathered troops. Meanwhile, Rodrigo confronts Yusuf, and the two fight. Yusuf gains the upper hand and disarms Rodrigo, but at the same time, Ordoñez and Jimena escape. Jimena rejects Ordoñez, who is in turn knocked unconscious by Rodrigo's mare Babieca. Alfonso and his forces arrive at the castle and overrun Yusuf's army. Enraged, Yusuf attempts to kill Rodrigo, but Jimena retrieves his sword, allowing Rodrigo to disarm Yusuf and defeat him.

Soon after, Alfonso pardons Rodrigo and grants him his blessing to marry Jimena, which Ordoñez accepts. Ordoñez apologizes to Rodrigo and Jimena, and joins them in their journey to Valencia, over which Rodrigo is granted dominion.

== Music compositions ==
The principal musical theme of El Cid: The Legend was composed and performed by Luis Fonsi. It is called "La fuerza de mi corazón".

The filmmakers also collaborated with the Spanish rock group Diosa, which had already created music for other Spanish feature films.

== Cast and characters ==
- Rodrigo Díaz de Vivar/El Cid
  - Voiced by Manel Fuentes (Spanish), Alex Warner (English)
- Jimena Díaz
  - Voiced by Natalia Verbeke (Spanish), Amber Ockrassa (English)
- Yusuf ibn Tashfin/Ben Yusuf
  - Voiced by Carlos Latre (Spanish), Joshua Zamrycki (English)
- Prince Al-Mu'tamin
  - Voiced by Dani García (Spanish), Jonathan Brown (English)
- Count Gormaz
  - Voiced by Sancho Gracia (Spanish), Carlos Castanon (English)
- Count Garcia Ordonez
  - Voiced by Carlos Latre (Spanish), Robert Paterson (English)
- King Ferdinand the Great of Castile and León
  - Voiced by Arsenio Corsellas (Spanish), Robert Long (English)
- Prince Sancho
  - Voiced by Sergio Zamora (Spanish), Jonathan Brown (English)
- King Alfonso VI
  - Voiced by Juan Antonio Bernal (Spanish), James Phillips (English)
- Princess Urraca
  - Voiced by Loles León (Spanish), Molly Malcom (English)
- Garcés
  - Voiced by Miguel Ángel Rodríguez (Spanish), Richard Felix (English)
- Alvar Fanez
  - Voiced by Eduardo Farelo (Spanish), Toby Harper (English)
- Diego Laínez
  - Voiced by Manolo García (Spanish), Chris Hood (English)
- Babieca, Mare of Rodrigo
- Ruidoso, the Badger of Garcés
- Emir Al-Qadir II of Toledo

== Awards ==
- 2004
  - Goya Awards - Best Animated Picture

== See also ==
- List of Spanish films of 2003
