= MasterChef (Spanish TV series) =

- Genre: Cooking show
- Created by: Franc Roddam
- Directed by: Eva Sanz; Jordi Rossell; Patricia Fernández (set); Oiane Sagasti (outdoors)
- Judges: Pepe Rodríguez Rey; Jordi Cruz; Samantha Vallejo-Nágera
- Narrated by: Jordi Cruz
- Country of origin: Spain
- Original language: Spanish
- No. of seasons: 11 (with 2 spin-offs of 6 and 9 seasons and 2 specials)
- No. of episodes: 252 (all seasons)

Production
- Executive producers: Macarena Rey; Ana Rivas; Alexa Portillo; Begoña Rumeu; Carmen Marín
- Producers: Televisión Española; Shine Iberia
- Production locations: Estudios Buñuel, Madrid
- Running time: 150 minutes
- Production company: Shine Iberia

Original release
- Network: La 1
- Release: 10 April 2013 – present

Related
- MasterChef Celebrity; MasterChef Junior; Top Chef

MasterChef is a Spanish competitive reality television cooking show based on the British television cooking game show of the same title. It premiered on La 1 on 10 April 2013. The show is, nowadays, presented by Pepe Rodríguez, Jordi Cruz and Samantha Vallejo-Nágera, who are also the judges of the competition.

== History ==
In the first season, only 15 people were chosen from among the 9,000 in the initial casting selection and competed for the title of MasterChef. The winner was given 100,000 euros, the opportunity to publish his own book of recipes, and the chance to attend the esteemed culinary school Le Cordon Bleu.

The initial selections began on February 4, 2013 in five areas of the country. All types of people came, including high-level executives, housewives, and construction workers. All of the candidates came together over their love of cooking. They had to be amateur cooks without culinary experience, but at the same time very talented.

The contestants competed against each other in individual challenges in the kitchen and also in group challenges outside of the set kitchen. The judges were Pepe Rodríguez, Jordi Cruz, and Samantha Vallejo-Nágera. The first season aired on La 1 of Televisión Española starting on April 10, 2013, and was hosted by Eva González.

In October 2013, MasterChef received the Ondas Awards for Best entertainment program in Spanish television.

== Show format ==
- Caja misteriosa (Mystery Box Challenge). The contestants receive ingredients with which they have to make a dish according to the specifications of the judges. The contestants have a certain amount of time in order to do this. Once they are finished, the judges deliberate and the two to three best dishes determine who will be the captains in the following challenge.
- Prueba por equipos (Team Challenge). This challenge takes place outside of the kitchens of Masterchef and involves cooking for celebrities or other groups of people. The captains have to decide on the dishes that they are going to prepare and which of the other contestants will be on their team to help them. The losing team then faces off in the elimination round.
- Prueba de eliminación (Elimination Test). The winning team observes the losing team from the gallery from in the final challenge. The losing team has to cook the recipe chosen by the judges. The judges «deliberate» and the contestant that has made the «worst» dish is eliminated from the program.
- Prueba de presión (Pressure Test). This is the most difficult challenge. A celebrity chef visits the set and instructs the contestants on how to make his most famous dish. The contestants have to then recreate it.
- Reto creativo (Creative Test). The judges dictate which dish the contestants have to make.

== First season (2013) ==
Fifteen amateur chefs competed in different challenges cooking alone or in teams, both in the set kitchen and elsewhere. Throughout the first season of MasterChef, the contestants were visited by the best chefs in Spain who gave them exclusive cooking classes. These included Juan Mari Arzak, Pedro Subijana, Joan Roca, Paco Roncero, Dani García, Quique Dacosta, Eneko Atxa, and Andoni Luis Aduriz, among others. The finale featured Spanish chef Ferran Adrià, considered the best chef in the world, as one of the judges.

=== Contestants ===
Contestants	Age	Hometown	Profession	Result
Juan Manuel Sánchez	25	Almería	Waiter	Winner
Eva Micaela Millán	32	Córdoba	Biologist, administrative	Runner-up
Fabián León	18	Palma	Publicity student	Third Place
José David Moliner	33	Valencia	Computer engineer	13th Evicted
Maribel Gil	59	Benicarló	Housewife	12th Evicted
José Antonio Cerezo	37	Alcañiz	Welder	11th Evicted
Clara Pérez Villalón	22	Madrid	Economics student	10th Evicted
María de la Fuente	23	Alicante	Make-up artist	9th Evicted
José Luis Asín	58	Pamplona	Chartered Police	8th Evicted
Noé Carmona	31	Córdoba	Revenue manager	7th Evicted
Santiaga Muñoz	52	Ciudad Real	Housewife	3rd and 6th Evicted
Efrén Álvarez	23	Lugo	Finance student	5th Evicted
Nati Sánchez	42	Bilbao	Administrative	4th Evicted
Juanma Villar (†)	48	Madrid	Entrepreneur	2nd Evicted
Paloma Ayensa	22	Madrid	Law student	1st Evicted

== Second season (2014) ==
During the finale of the first season of MasterChef, Eva González told viewers that the program would be renewed for a second season in May 2014, after MasterChef Junior. Starting in late October 2013 Televisión Española and Shine Iberia started casting for the second season. It premiered on April 9. During the week before, Radiotelevisión Española aired various cooking specials to lead up to the show.

=== Contestants ===
Contestants	Age	Hometown	Profession	Results
Vicky Pulgarín	31	Palma	Unemployed butcher	Winner
Mateo Sierra	20	Huesca	Art History student	Runner-up
Cristóbal Gómez	33	Granada	Waiter	8th and 14th Evicted
Emil Samper	44	Barcelona	Advertising filmmaker	13th Evicted
Lorena Lasanta	39	Málaga	Sound engineer, DJ	6th and 12th Evicted
Cristina Romero	46	Madrid	Entrepreneur	11th Evicted
Milagrosa Gavilán	51	Jerez	Saleswoman	10th Evicted
Marina Rodríguez	46	Palma	Former direction assistant	9th Evicted
Gonzalo Ribot	48	Palma	Yoga teacher	Quit
Celia Lastres	27	Madrid	Radiotherapy technician	7th Evicted
Jorge Cuéllar	36	Segovia	Molecular biology doctor	5th Evicted
Miguel Ángel Martínez	41	Madrid	Funeral director	4th Evicted
Churra Costa	71	Pontevedra	Housewife	3rd Evicted
Daniel Díez	34	Valencia	Architect	2nd Evicted
Lola Hidalgo	22	Córdoba	Environmental sciences student	1st Evicted

== Third season (2015) ==
Televisión Española and Shine Iberia started casting for the third season in December 2014. It premiered on April 7, 2015.

=== Contestants ===
Contestants	Age	Hometown	Profession	Result
Carlos Maldonado	25	Talavera de la Reina	Fast food peddler	Winner
Sally Stephanih Caballero	31	Ciudad Real	Optical assistant	Runner-up
Andrea Vicens	22	Barcelona	Odontology student, model	Third Place
Antonio Romero	26	Sevilla	Quality control lab technician	Fourth Place
Kevin Bordas	22	Tarragona	Waiter, model	12th Evicted
Lidia Folgar	29	Pontevedra	Nutritionist	11th Evicted
Mila Calabuig	58	Valencia	Footwear businesswoman	7th and 10th Evicted
Fidel López	36	Alicante	Waiter	9th Evicted
Pablo Pérez	27	Valencia	Martial arts champion	8th Evicted
Víctor Mendicuti	30	Málaga	Air freshener entrepreneur	6th Evicted
Mireia Ruiz	33	Murcia	NGO pedagogue	5th Evicted
Encina Rodríguez	69	Gandía	Retiree	4th Evicted
Raquel García	32	Pamplona	Dental protesthist	3rd Evicted
Sara Martín	27	Barcelona	Unemployed teacher	2nd Evicted
Alberto Sempere	18	Valencia	Medicine student	1st Evicted

== Fourth season (2016) ==
=== Contestants ===
Contestants	Age	Hometown	Profession	Result
Virginia Naranjo	39	Jerez	Housewife	Winner
Ángel García	31	Valencia	Dishwasher	Runner-up
José Luis Losa (†)	41	Albacete	Industrial painter	Third Place
Rocío Morcillo	43	Barcelona	Events planner	Fourth Place
Raquel Naranjo	39	Jerez	Housewife	12th Evicted
David González	20	Castro Urdiales	Sport Science student	4th and 11th Evicted
Natalia Khodzinskaya	28	Barcelona	Freelance journalist, model	10th Evicted
Pablo López	39	A Coruña	Structures' engineer	9th Evicted
Raquel Reichel Pardo	33	Arguis	Waitress, forestry agent	8th Evicted
Daniel del Toro	45	Huelva	Computer scientist	7th Evicted
Dania Gandul	33	Sevilla	Telemarketer	6th Evicted
Juan Rosillo	20	Sevilla	Nursing student	5th Evicted
Esmeralda Marcos	45	Massalfassar	Unemployed	3rd Evicted
Salva Linares	31	Busot	Administrative assistant	2nd Evicted
Emilia Cuenca	64	Madrid	Housewife	Quit
Ana Aniuska March	22	Valencia	Long-distance athlete, teacher	1st Evicted

== Fifth season (2017) ==
=== Contestants ===
Contestants	Age	Profession	Hometown	Result
Jorge Brazález	28	Granada	Former footballer	Winner
Nathan Minguell	27	Barcelona	Room chief	Runner-up
Edurne Trancho	65	Tolosa	Retiree	Third Place
Elena Sánchez	31	Sevilla	Police officer	9th Evicted and Fourth Place
Miri Pérez-Cabrero	23	Barcelona	Blogger	Fifth Place
Silene Carvalho da Rocha	43	Madrid	Baker	13th Evicted
Odkhuu Erdenebayar	30	Mongolia	Fashion designer	12th Evicted
José María González	31	Jerez	Banderillero	8th and 11th Evicted
Laila Kachán	35	Valencia	Model	10th Evicted
José Luis Castán	45	Madrid	Entrepreneur	7th Evicted
Paloma Garralda	28	Madrid	Lawyer	6th Evicted
Adrián Gómez	26	Tarragona	Waiter	5th Evicted
Lorena Jiménez	32	Barcelona	Make-up artist & hairdresser	4th Evicted
Salva García	50	Barcelona	Hairdresser	3rd Evicted
Paula Martínez	28	Madrid	Psychologist	2nd Evicted
Jordi Plà	50	Barcelona	Commercial delegate	1st Evicted

== Sixth season (2018) ==
The casting of the sixth season finished on January 15, 2018, 150 of the 23.000 participant was chosen to be challengers, in which only 15 will be candidates to win the program. It was released on April 22, 2018 in La 1. It will be the most demanding season.

Despite being pregnant, Eva González will not be replaced, although she will be absent after the 6th episode.

=== Contestants ===
Contestants	Age	Hometown	Profession	Result
Marta Verona	23	Madrid	Nutrition student	Winner
Ketty Fresneda	28	Pontevedra	Dietitian	Runner-up
Oxana Retinskaia	52	Gijón	Housekeeper	Third Place
Toni Carceller	33	Valencia	Community manager	Fourth Place
Daniel Escribano	32	Madrid	Firefighter	5th and 12th Evicted
Sofía Janer	22	Barcelona	Tourism student	11th Evicted
Víctor Gonzalo	34	Barcelona	Telecoms' engineer	10th Evicted
Jon Marín	52	Bilbao	Innkeeper	9th Evicted
Fabio Fernández-Amo	35	Madrid	Financier	8th Evicted
Jorge Esteban	27	Granada	Journalist	7th Evicted
Marina Arnal	53	Valencia	Saleswoman	6th Evicted
Ramón Martín	41	Madrid	Bus driver	4th Evicted
Eva Sakay	42	Barcelona	Saleswoman	3rd Evicted
Loli Rodríguez	71	Sevilla	Retiree	2nd Evicted
Fernando de Alvear	42	Madrid	Wine cellar worker	1st Evicted

== Seventh season (2019) ==
=== Contestants ===
Contestants	Age	Hometown	Profession	Results
Aleix Puig	26	Barcelona	Fishmonger	Winner
Teresa Abalde	45	A Coruña	Photographer	Runner-up
Valentín García	30	Madrid	Entrepreneur	Third Place
Aitana Ávila	32	Bizkaia	HR	Fourth Place
Carlos Alba	39	Sevilla	Businessman	12th Evicted
Samira Fernández	26	Barcelona	Stay-at-home mom	11th Evicted
Carmen Alcoba	29	Cáceres	Shopgirl	6th and 10th Evicted
Natalia Martínez	28	Asturias	Gravestone designer	9th Evicted
Gloria Morales	36	Badajoz	Housekeeper	8th Evicted
Marcos Moya	37	La Pobla de Vallbona	Forensic locksmith	7th Evicted
Josecho Velasco	73	Madrid	Retired economist	Injured
Osiris Florentino	37	Valencia	Waiter	5th Evicted
Laly Pascual	51	Ávila	Housewife	4th Evicted
Alicia Vallés	42	Barcelona	IT saleswoman	3rd Evicted
Sara Muñoz	24	Tarragona	Mechanical engineer	2nd Evicted
Jeancha Baudin	34	Madrid	Unemployed	1st Evicted

== Eighth season (2020) ==
The show begun on April 14, 2020. Almost 30,000 people attended the castings but only 50 went to the final phase where the judges decided which one attended the first task.

For the first time in the series, due to no eliminated contestant managing to cook a decent enough dish in the repechage episode, no one was brought back by the judges. Instead, they gave candidates eliminated in the last casting process a second chance to join the kitchens. Carlos won and entered the show.

=== Contestants ===
Contestants	Age	Hometown	Profession	Results
Ana Iglesias	24	Madrid	Jewelry entrepreneur	Winner
Andrés Andy García	26	Madrid	Lawyer	Runner-up
Iván Mariñas	39	A Coruña	Personal coach	Third Place
Alberto Gras	31	Barcelona	Futsal coach	Fourth Place
Luna Zacharias	29	Lanzarote	Yoga teacher	Fifth Place
José Mari Royo	46	Palma	Entrepreneur, musician	13th Evicted
Juana Ferrer	74	Segovia	Community doorkeeper	12th Evicted
Michael Salazar	50	United States	English teacher	11th Evicted
Teresa Sanfeliú	57	Barcelona	Economist	10th Evicted
Carlos García-Delgado	41	Cádiz	Tobacco commercial	9th Evicted
Sara Lúa Barreiro	33	A Coruña	Wedding store manager	8th Evicted
Sonsoles Conde	43	Burgos	Pharmacist	7th Evicted
Fidel Ministerio	36	Barcelona	Musician	6th Evicted
Saray Carrillo	27	Córdoba	Social educator	5th Evicted
Rosa García	49	León	Air Force Commander	4th Evicted
Mónica Longo	48	Oviedo	Cleaner, waitress	3rd Evicted
Adrienne Chaballe	34	Sevilla	Marketing director	2nd Evicted
Sito Camacho	38	Madrid	Mortuary employee	1st Evicted

== Ninth season (2021) ==
In episode 6, two frontline workers that couldn't participate in the last casting stage due to the COVID-19 pandemic were given a second chance to enter the game as they'll battle for a white apron and the chance to enter the game. José beat Nando, and entered the kitchens.

=== Contestants ===
Contestants	Age	Hometown	Profession	Results
Arnau París	32	Boada	Faucet salesman	Winner
María Meri Rodas	24	Cardedeu	Physiotherapist, medicine student	Runner-up
María Morales	27	Tomelloso	Event planner	6th Evicted and Third Place
Fran Martínez	29	Cuenca	Waiter	Fourth Place
Ofelia Hentschel	29	Santiago de Compostela	Horse riding entrepreneur	13th Evicted
José Abellán	34	Murcia	Cardiologist	12th Evicted
Toni de Pascual	34	Palma	Entrepreneur, poker player	11th Evicted
Amelia Amelicious Platón	23	Barcelona	Pharmacy Student	10th Evicted
Jiaping Ma	35	China	Head of business development	9th Evicted
Dani Vallejo	41	Getxo	Gastronomy businessman	8th Evicted
Pepe	37	Madrid	Musician	7th Evicted
Nando Ortells	31	Valencia	Emergency nurse	Not chosen
Alicia Fábrega	43	Madrid	Marketing director	5th Evicted
Vero Moreno	35	Rota	Civil Guard	4th Evicted
Álex Katib	28	Barcelona	Sports promoter	3rd Evicted
José María Montero	18	Badajoz	Restoration student	2nd Evicted
Jesús Hornillos	69	Burgos	Retired lawyer	1st Evicted

== Tenth season (2022) ==
=== Contestants ===
Contestants	Age	Hometown	Profession	Results
María Lo	32	Cádiz	Unemployed	Winner
Verónica Gómez de Liaño	26	Salamanca	Publicist	Runner-up
David Pascual	38	Oviedo	Entrepreneur, former porn actor	Third Place
Adrián Rejón	28	Bizkaia	Installation technician	Fourth Place
Patricia Díaz	32	Barcelona	Administrative	6th and 13th Evicted
Claudia Castellví	28	Girona	Administrative	12th Evicted
Jokin Iriondo	30	Gipuzkoa	Financial Manager	11th Evicted
Luismi Regidor	35	Guadalajara	Firefighter	10th Evicted
Yannick Boeykens	28	Belgium	Sales coordinator	9th Evicted
Julia González	32	Madrid	Sommelier	8th Evicted
Teresa Jiménez-La Blanca	33	Madrid	Rentier	7th Evicted
Eva Díez	29	Valencia	Pediatrician	5th Evicted
Paula Díaz	23	Madrid	Auxiliary nurse	4th Evicted
Iván Chalabi	38	Madrid	Commercial	3rd Evicted
Giraldo Carales	33	Cuba	Former water poloist, model	2nd Evicted
Berto Alonso	24	Segovia	Clerk	1st Evicted

== Eleventh season (2023) ==
=== Contestants ===
Contestants	Age	Hometown	Profession	Results
Eneko Fernández	38	Zaragoza	Ex-footballer, boutique clerk	Winner
Álex Cañada	19	Barcelona	Cooking student, MCJ 4	Runner-up
Lluís de la Riva	28	A Coruña	HR, model	Third Place
Pilu Cuenca	24	Cádiz	Air traffic controller	Fourth Place
Jotha Skelton	35	León	DJ	Semifinalist
Ana María Pérez	30	Estepona	Waitress	23rd Evicted
Luca Dazi	18	Barcelona	TikToker	22nd Evicted
Jorge Juan Fernández	41	Alicante	Forest firefighter	21st Evicted
Marta Alguersuari	46	Andorra	Entrepreneur	13th and 20th Evicted
Claudia Ferranti	38	Italy	Actress, former TV host	19th Evicted
Francesc Repiso	58	Lérida	Businessman, olympic shooter	18th Evicted
Camino Escorial	26	Madrid	Publicist	17th Evicted
Fray Marcos Julio García	44	Venezuela	Dominican priest	16th Evicted
David del Campo	27	Barcelona	Project manager	15th Evicted
Laura Baiges	28	Tarragona	Web designer	11th and 14th Evicted
Merce de Las	51	Madrid	Billing technician	12th Evicted
Leti Ruiz	52	Valencia	Judge	10th Evicted
Jeremy Amador	20	Granada	Real estate commercial	9th Evicted
Sergio Domínguez	32	Madrid	Taxist	8th Evicted
Tuki Sánchez	32	Madrid	Audiovisual technician	7th Evicted
Larraitz Lopez	32	Barakaldo	Waitress	6th Evicted
Carlota Abril	25	Valladolid	Lawyer	5th Evicted
Frank Andrey	34	Brazil	Fashion photographer	4th Evicted
Karla Ceballos	22	Sevilla	Student	3rd Evicted
Rachel Anne Earley	26	United States	English teacher, YouTuber	2nd Evicted
Roberto Terrón	45	Palma	Gastronomic consultant	1st Evicted
Albert	37	Barcelona	Foundry worker	Not chosen
Manuela	27	Valencia	Energy adviser	Not chosen
Izarbe Pesquer	29	Huesca	Lingerie store manager	Not chosen
Daniel	27	Barcelona	Taxist	Not chosen
Israel	38	Asturias	Pulpero	Not chosen

== Twelfth season (2024) ==
=== Contestants ===
Contestants	Age	Hometown	Profession	Results
Ángela Gimeno	29	Valencia	Publicist	Winner
María Álvarez	32	Madrid	Hotel businesswoman	Runner-up
Gonzalo Retenaga	49	Madrid	Hotel entrepreneur	Third Place
Samya Aghbalou	25	Morocco	Jeweler	Fourth Place and 7th Evicted
Celeste Almagro	35	Barcelona	Accountant	13th Evicted
Alberto Marín	43	Madrid	Guitarist	12th Evicted
Gonzalo Pulga de la Torre	37	Madrid	Retail manager	11th Evicted
Pilar Moncayo	40	Palma	Shop assistant	10th Evicted
José Doña	22	Yunquera	Ex-military and waiter	9th Evicted
David Massip	27	Barcelona	Legionary	5th & 8th Evicted
Maicol Vela	23	Colombia	Accountant and model	6th Evicted
Tamara Galimova	31	Russia	Financial consultant	Quit
Esther Choco Gombou	37	Dominican Republic	English teacher	4th Evicted
Ramón Rodriguez	30	Málaga	Social educator	3rd Evicted
Adriana Calleja	41	Bilbao	Bingo waitress	2nd Evicted
Tessa Amezaga	27	Madrid	Singer and DJ	1st Evicted

== Thirteenth season (2025) ==
=== Contestants ===
Contestants	Age	Hometown	Profession	Results
Gabriela Hinojosa	31	Madrid	Financial Officer	Winner
Beatriz Bea Lopez	33	Toledo	Salesperson	Runner-up
Ismael Ruiz	42	Valencia	Police Geographer	Third Place
Ana Callís	32	Barcelona	Journalist	Fourth Place
Elena Gorordo	53	Guipuzcoa	Public Relations	4th and 13th Evicted
Emilio Manzano	21	Toledo	Student	12th Evicted
Chema Krema	32	Sevilla	Yoga Teacher	11th Evicted
Yago Vivar	39	Málaga	Financial Advisor	10th Evicted
Clara Yebes	29	Valencia	Teacher	9th Evicted
Víctor Hernán	44	Madrid	Physiotherapist	8th Evicted
Ariana Feygin	20	Barcelona	Content Creator, MCJUS 6	6th/7th Evicted
Limin Chen	25	Tenerife	Student	6th/7th Evicted
Ana María Moyano	62	Jaén	Administrator	5th Evicted
Eva Jiménez	52	Madrid	Occupational Risk Technician	3rd Evicted
Jorge López	35	Madrid	Digital Project Manager	2nd Evicted
Alejandro Flores	32	Alicante	Dog Trainer	Quit
Miguel Mayordomo	32	Madrid	Lawyer	1st Evicted

== Ratings ==
Colour key (nominal):
– Highest rating during the season
– Lowest rating during the season

MasterChef Spain: Season 1 consolidated viewership and adjusted position
Episode	Original airdate	Timeslot	Viewers (millions)	Share	Night rank	Source
1	10 April 2013		2.05	11%		
2	17 April 2013		1.92	10%		
3	23 April 2013		2.92	15.5%	#1	
4	30 April 2013		3.49	18.6%	#1	
5	7 May 2013		2.81	14.5%		
6	14 May 2013		2.88	15.3%	#1	
7	21 May 2013		3.43	17.7%	#1	
8	28 May 2013		3.60	18.9%	#1	
9	4 June 2013		3.70	19.5%	#1	
10	11 June 2013		4.02	21.6%	#1	
11	18 June 2013		3.95	20%	#1	
12	25 June 2013		4.10	22.4%	#1	
13	2 July 2013		5.52	33.1%	#1	

MasterChef Spain: Season 2 consolidated viewership and adjusted position
Episode	Original airdate	Timeslot	Viewers (millions)	Share	Night rank	Source
1	9 April 2014		2.85	16.5%	#1	
2	23 April 2014		2.73	16.3%	#1	
3	30 April 2014		2.80	16.4%	#1	
4	7 May 2014		3.22	17.8%	#1	
5	14 May 2014		2.53	13.3%		
6	21 May 2014		3.16	17.6%	#1	
7	28 May 2014		3.43	18.7%	#1	
8	4 June 2014		3.68	20.3%	#1	
9	11 June 2014		3.60	20.7%	#1	
10	18 June 2014		3.63	23.1%	#1	
11	25 June 2014		3.56	20.6%	#1	
12	2 July 2014		3.67	21.7%	#1	
13	9 July 2014		2.57	14.5%		
14	16 July 2014		3.18	22.4%	#1	
15	23 July 2014		4.10	27.1%	#1	

MasterChef Spain: Season 3 consolidated viewership and adjusted position
Episode	Original airdate	Timeslot	Viewers (millions)	Share	Night rank	Source
1	7 April 2015		3.05	16%	#2	
2	14 April 2015		3.19	18.6%	#2	
3	21 April 2015		2.90	17.1%	#2	
4	28 April 2015		3.03	17.1%	#2	
5	5 May 2015		3.36	19.5%	#2	
6	12 May 2015		2.96	17.5%	#2	
7	19 May 2015		3.10	17.9%	#2	
8	26 May 2015		3.00	17.2%	#2	
9	2 June 2015		3.16	19%	#2	
10	9 June 2015		2.80	17.9%	#2	
11	16 June 2015		3.20	18.5%	#2	
12	23 June 2015		2.61	18.7%	#2	
13	30 June 2015		3.77	26.8%	#1	

MasterChef Spain: Season 4 consolidated viewership and adjusted position
Episode	Original airdate	Timeslot	Viewers (millions)	Share	Night rank	Source
1	6 April 2016		2.72	15.5%		
2	13 April 2016		2.73	16.9%		
3	20 April 2016		2.74	16.7%		
4	27 April 2016		2.87	17.8%	#1	
5	4 May 2016		2.99	18.4%	#1	
6	11 May 2016		3.12	20%	#1	
7	18 May 2016		3.04	18.8%	#1	
8	25 May 2016		3.02	19.6%		
9	1 June 2016		3.04	18%		
10	8 June 2016		3.50	22%	#1	
11	15 June 2016		3.12	22.4%	#1	
12	22 June 2016		3.20	22.1%	#1	
13	29 June 2016		3.78	28.4%	#1	

MasterChef Spain: Season 5 consolidated viewership and adjusted position
Episode	Original airdate	Timeslot	Viewers (millions)	Share	Night rank	Source
1	16 April 2017		2.36	16.7%	#1	
2	23 April 2017		1.87	12.3%		
3	25 April 2017		2.02	16.3%		
4	30 April 2017		2.34	15.8%	#1	
5	7 May 2017		2.51	16.1%		
6	14 May 2017		2.63	18%	#1	
7	21 May 2017		2.28	15%	#1	
8	28 May 2017		2.89	17.8%	#1	
9	4 June 2017		2.50	16%	#1	
10	11 June 2017		2.76	19.7%	#1	
11	18 June 2017		2.41	17.2%	#1	
12	25 June 2017		2.57	20.6%	#1	
13	28 June 2017		3.26	26.1%	#1	

MasterChef Spain: Season 6 consolidated viewership and adjusted position
Episode	Original airdate	Timeslot	Viewers (millions)	Share	Night rank	Source
1	22 April 2018		2.54	16.8%		
2	29 April 2018		2.36	14.6%		
3	6 May 2018		2.39	14.4%		
4	13 May 2018		2.48	15.6%		
5	20 May 2018		2.31	14.7%		
6	28 May 2018		2.34	16.8%	#1	
7	4 June 2018		2.69	20.8%	#1	
8	11 June 2018		2.51	19.1%	#1	
9	18 June 2018		2.53	19.8%	#1	
10	21 June 2018		2.27	20%	#1	
11	25 June 2018		2.74	23.1%	#1	
12	2 July 2018		2.69	22.4%	#1	
13	9 July 2018		2.96	27.7%	#1	

MasterChef Spain: Season 7 consolidated viewership and adjusted position
Episode	Original airdate	Timeslot	Viewers (millions)	Share	Night rank	Source
1	26 March 2019		2.17	21%	#1	
2	2 April 2019		2.13	16.6%	#1	
3	9 April 2019		2.24	18.3%	#1	
4	23 April 2019		1.57	9.6%		
5	30 April 2019		1.86	14.1%		
6	7 May 2019		1.51	12.3%		
7	14 May 2019		1.51	13.6%		
8	21 May 2019		1.76	13.9%		
9	28 May 2019		1.73	14%		
10	4 June 2019		1.65	13.6%		
11	11 June 2019		1.86	14.9%		
12	18 June 2019		1.85	14.6%		
13	25 June 2019		2.04	18.8%		

MasterChef Spain: Season 8 consolidated viewership and adjusted position
Episode	Original airdate	Timeslot	Viewers (millions)	Share	Night rank	Source
1	13 April 2020		2.65	20%	#1	
2	20 April 2020		2.67	18.6%	#1	
3	27 April 2020		2.91	20.2%	#1	
4	4 May 2020		2.90	21.8%	#1	
5	11 May 2020		2.94	22.7%	#1	
6	18 May 2020		3.11	23%	#1	
7	25 May 2020		2.88	22.9%	#1	
8	1 June 2020		3.02	22.7%	#1	
9	8 June 2020		2.92	23.7%	#1	
10	15 June 2020		3.09	24.6%	#1	
11	22 June 2020		2.88	23.2%	#1	
12	29 June 2020		2.74	23.7%	#1	
13	6 July 2020		3.08	30.3%	#1	

MasterChef Spain: Season 9 consolidated viewership and adjusted position
Episode	Original airdate	Timeslot	Viewers (millions)	Share	Night rank	Source
1	13 April 2021	Tuesday 10:10 pm	1.57	15%	#3	
2	20 April 2021	Tuesday 10:10 pm	1.67	14.9%	#3	
3	27 April 2021	Tuesday 10:10 pm	1.67	15%	#3	
4	11 May 2021	Tuesday 10:10 pm	1.46	13%	#3	
5	18 May 2021	Tuesday 10:10 pm	1.60	14.7%	#3	
6	25 May 2021	Tuesday 10:10 pm	1.60	15.9%	#1	
7	1 June 2021	Tuesday 10:10 pm	1.69	14%	#3	
8	8 June 2021	Tuesday 10:35 pm	1.63	15.3%		
9	15 June 2021	Tuesday 10:35 pm	1.60	15%		
10	22 June 2021	Tuesday 10:35 pm	1.70	15.8%		
11	29 June 2021	Tuesday 10:35 pm	1.70	16.1%		
12	6 July 2021	Tuesday 10:35 pm	1.36	10.9%		
13	13 July 2021	Tuesday 10:35 pm	2.02	22%	#1	

MasterChef Spain: Season 10 consolidated viewership and adjusted position
Episode	Original airdate	Timeslot	Viewers (millions)	Share	Night rank	Source
1	18 April 2022		1.64	15%	#1	
2	25 April 2022		1.74	14.2%	#1	
3	2 May 2022		1.62	13.7%	#1	
4	9 May 2022		1.72	14.5%	#1	
5	16 May 2022		1.72	14.7%	#1	
6	23 May 2022		1.68	15%	#1	
7	30 May 2022		1.69	14.3%	#1	
8	13 June 2022		1.49	13.4%	#1	
9	20 June 2022		1.62	14%	#1	
10	27 June 2022		1.58	13.8%	#1	
11	4 July 2022		1.57	14.2%	#1	
12	11 July 2022		1.54	15.3%	#1	
13	18 July 2022		1.78	17.8%	#1	

MasterChef Spain: Season 11 consolidated viewership and adjusted position
Episode	Original airdate	Timeslot	Viewers (millions)	Share	Night rank	Source
1	27 March 2023	Monday 10:05 pm	1.53	13.8%	#1	
2	28 March 2023	Tuesday 10:35 pm	1.26	13.9%	#2	
3	3 April 2023	Monday 10:05 pm	1.41	12%	#1	
4	9 April 2023	Sunday 10:05 pm	1.12	9.7%	#3	
5	10 April 2023	Monday 10:05 pm	1.38	11.5%	#1	
6	11 April 2023	Tuesday 10:05 pm	1.12	9.8%	#2	
7	17 April 2023	Monday 10:05 pm	1.43	11.8%	#2	
8	18 April 2023	Tuesday 10:05 pm	1.14	10.0%	#3	
9	24 April 2023	Monday 10:05 pm				
10	25 April 2023	Tuesday 10:05 pm				
11	1 May 2023	Monday 10:05 pm				
12	2 May 2023	Tuesday 10:05 pm				
13	8 May 2023	Monday 10:05 pm				
14	9 May 2023	Tuesday 10:05 pm				
15	15 May 2023	Monday 10:05 pm				
16	16 May 2023	Tuesday 10:05 pm				
17	22 May 2023	Monday 10:05 pm				
18	23 May 2023	Tuesday 10:05 pm				
19	29 May 2023	Monday 10:05 pm				
20	30 May 2023	Tuesday 10:05 pm				
21	5 June 2023	Monday 10:05 pm				
22	6 June 2023	Tuesday 10:05 pm				
23	12 June 2023	Monday 10:05 pm				
24	13 June 2023	Tuesday 10:05 pm				
25	19 June 2023	Monday 10:05 pm				
26	20 June 2023	Tuesday 10:05 pm				

== Awards ==
Year	Award	Category	Nominee(s)	Result	Ref.
2013	Premios de la Crítica de FesTVal	Best interesting program	MasterChef Spain	Winner	
2013	Lovie Awards	Best TV program	MasterChef Spain	Winner	
2013	Premios Ondas	Best entertaining program	MasterChef Spain	Winner	
2014	Premios Zapping	Best entertaining program	MasterChef Spain	Winner	
2018	Premios Iris	Best production	MasterChef Spain	Winner	
2020	Premios Ondas	Best entertaining program	MasterChef Spain	Winner	
