= MasterChef Junior (Spanish TV series) =

- Genre: Cooking show
- Presented by: Eva González
- Judges: Pepe Rodríguez Rey; Jordi Cruz; Samantha Vallejo-Nágera
- Country of origin: Spain
- Original language: Spanish
- No. of seasons: 8
- No. of episodes: 46

Production
- Executive producers: Macarena Rey; Ana Rivas
- Running time: 150 minutes
- Production company: Shine Iberia

Original release
- Network: La 1
- Release: 23 December 2013 – 3 January 2024

Related
- MasterChef; MasterChef Celebrity

MasterChef Junior is a gastronomic TV program first aired on 23 December 2013 on La 1. Three thousand children attended the casting for the first season. The first season consisted of 4 episodes. Since season 2, all of the seasons have had 6 episodes.

It was formerly hosted by Eva González, while Jordi Cruz, Samantha Vallejo-Nágera and Pepe Rodríguez Rey are the chefs and remain on the show.

== Finalists ==
Winners	Runner-ups	3rd place	Eliminated (in order)
Mario Palacios	Ana Luna Navarro	Esther Núñez; Juan Dávila	
Manuel Esteve	Martina Segura	Aina Roglán; Teresa Barrieras	
María Fernández-Victorio	Lukas Vives	Covadonga García; Martina Pueyo	
Paula Alós	Paloma Martínez	Álex Cañada; Natalia Jiménez	
Esther Requena	María Blanco	Gonzalo Cordero; Lucía Fernández	
Josetxo Pérez	Pachu Guitart	Paula Biblioni; Candela Alcántara	
Lucía "Lu" Pérez	María Alcón	Leo Schultz; Albert Hernández	
Aurora Ruiz	Nicolás Alonso	Henar; Javier Valverde	
Guillem Serrat	Carla González	Olivia; Ariel Sanz	
Loreto Riera	Jesús San Roque	Estanis Merello	
Valentina Salazar	Ana Piquer	Marcos Jiménez	
