= Eva González =

Spanish actress, TV presenter and beauty queen

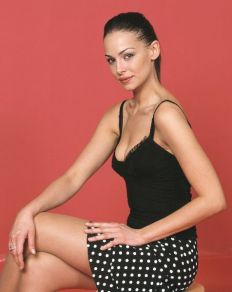
- Born: Eva María González Fernández; 5 November 1980 (age 45); Mairena del Alcor, Seville, Spain
- Occupations: Actress; television presenter; model
- Height: 1.75 m (5 ft 9 in)
- Spouse: Cayetano Rivera Ordóñez (m. 2015)
- Children: 1
- Beauty pageant titleholder
- Title: Miss Seville; Miss Spain 2003
- Years active: 2003–present
- Hair color: Brown
- Eye color: Green
- Major competitions: Miss Seville (winner); Miss Spain 2003 (winner); Miss Universe 2003

Eva María González Fernández (born 5 November 1980) is a Spanish actress, television host and beauty pageant titleholder who represented her country at the Miss Universe 2003 pageant.

== Early life ==
González was born and raised in the town of Mairena del Alcor, Seville. She comes from a humble family. Her father, Manuel González was a farmer and her mother, Encarnación Fernández was a housewife. She has a younger sister, named María González Fernández. She studied up to the second year of a diploma in Social Work, then she began to work as a model in the agency that also has model, Raquel Revuelta Armengou in Seville.

== Career ==
=== Miss Spain 2003 ===
González participated at the Miss Spain pageant in 2003, representing Seville. She won the title at the age of 22 and then traveled to Panama City, Panama for the Miss Universe 2003 pageant. She did not enter the top 15. She wore a flamenco dress at the national costume presentation.

=== After Miss Spain ===
After her reign as Miss Spain 2003, González began modelling, walking the runway for Spain's high fashion designers and doing many photo shoots for magazines. She has worked as a television presenter on shows including Dímelo al oído (2006), Se llama copla (2007–2016), Tres deseos (2008), El juego del euromillón (2009), Supervivientes (2010), Satán & Eva (2012), MasterChef (2013–2018), MasterChef Junior (2013–2019), MasterChef Celebrity (2016–2018), El gran reto musical (2017) and La Voz (2019–present). She has also worked as an actress with small roles and cameos in different TV series and with a leading role on sitcom La tira (2008).

== Personal life ==
From 2001 to 2003, González was in a relationship with Antonio Roldán.

From 2004 to 2005, González was in a relationship with the actor, comedian and television presenter Arturo Valls.

From 2005 to 2008, González was in a relationship with the retired professional football player Iker Casillas.

On 6 November 2015, she married the bullfighter, Cayetano Rivera Ordóñez in the Church of Nuestra Señora de la Asunción of Mairena del Alcor in Seville. On 4 March 2018, she gave birth to the couple's first child, a boy, whom they called Cayetano Rivera González, was born in Seville.
