= Juan Ramón Lucas =

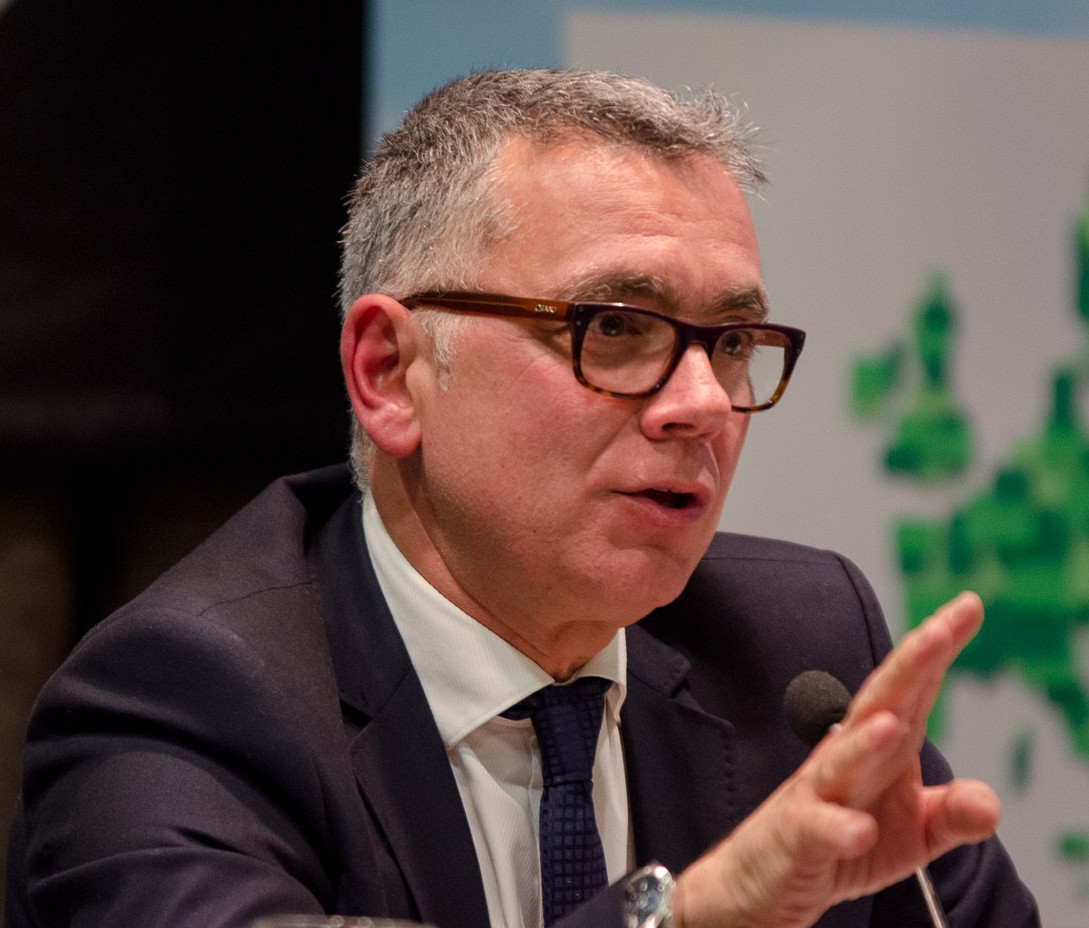
- Born: 2 November 1958 (age 67); Madrid, Spain
- Occupation: Television presenter

Juan Ramón Lucas (born November 2, 1958, in Madrid, Spain) is a Spanish TV presenter for Spanish Television.

== Biography ==
He began his career in 1979 working in Madrid in Radio Juventude Spanish for 'Youth Radio' and the Diario Informaciones.

His first contacts with television occurred in 1982, when he joined Spanish Television, to work in the program Informe Semanal, Spanish for 'Weekly Report'. Now he is back with an entrepreneurship reality television show called Codigo Emprende.

From	Till	Program	Media	Channel
1979	1981	Many	Radio	Radio Juventud de Madrid
1979	1981	Many	Newspaper	Diario Informaciones
1982	1987	Informe Semanal	TV	La 1
1987	1990	sección de economía	Radio	Cadena SER
1990	1992	Matinal SER	Radio	Cadena SER
1992	1993	Hora 14	Radio	Cadena SER
1993	1997	Al día	Radio	Onda Cero
1997	2001	Informativos Telecinco	TV	Telecinco
2001	2002	De buena mañana	TV	Antena 3
2002	2002	Confianza ciega	TV	Antena 3
2002	2002	Estudio de actores	TV	Antena 3
2003	2004	Todo Madrid	TV	Telemadrid
2003	2004	La Naranja Metálica	TV	Canal 9
2004	2004	7 días, 7 noches	TV	Antena 3
2004	2005	Esto es vida	TV	La 1
2006	2006	Brigada policial	TV	laSexta
2006	2006	Elegidos	TV	laSexta
2007	2007	El ojo público del ciudadano	TV	La 1
2008	2009	En noches como ésta	TV	La 1
2007	2012	En días como hoy	Radio	RNE
2013	Today	Código Emprende	TV	La 1

=== Education ===
BA in journalism from the Complutense University of Madrid.

=== Awards ===
- In 2004 he won the 'TV Academy Award' for 'Best Communicator in TV Entertainment Programs' for All Madrid.
- In 2008 the City council Noren Spaniard named him Knight of the Order of Sabadiego.
- In 2008 he received by the Federation of Radio and Television the Golden Mike for his work on the radio.
- In 2011 he received the Golden Antenna Award in the category of Radio. He also won the Ondas Award for his long and worthy professional career.
