= El Sevilla =

Miguel Ángel Rodríguez
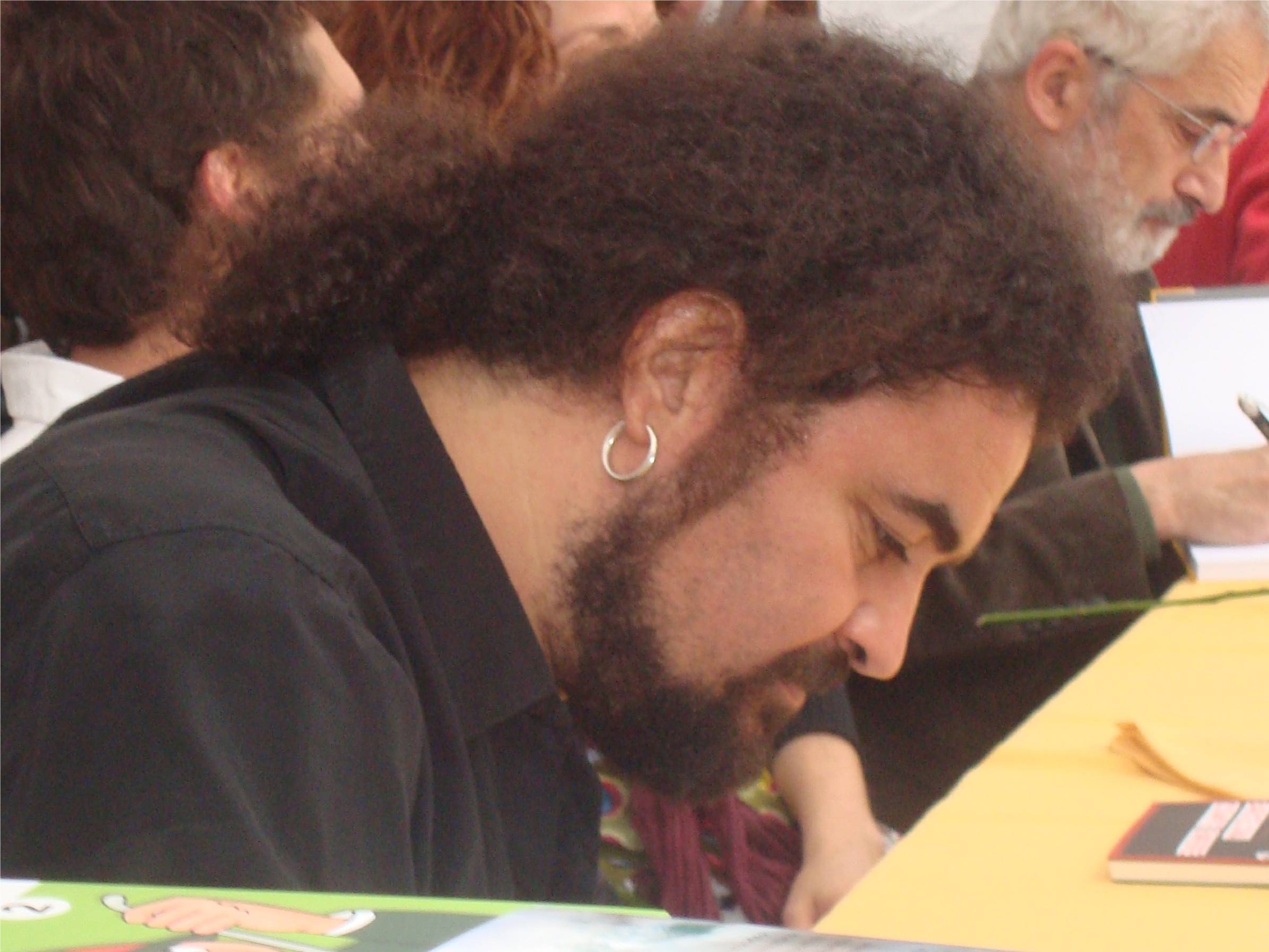

Background information
- Also known as: El Sevilla
- Born: Miguel Ángel Rodríguez Jiménez; 10 June 1970 (age 55); San Juan de Aznalfarache (Seville), Spain
- Origin: Seville, Spain
- Genres: Rock
- Occupations: Singer; Actor; Radio collaborator
- Instrument: Vocalist
- Years active: 1994–present (Mojinos Escozios)
- Labels: Horus; Dro

Miguel Ángel Rodríguez Jiménez (born 10 June 1970 in San Juan de Aznalfarache, Seville, Spain), better known as El Sevilla, is a Spanish actor and the lead singer of the comedy rock band Mojinos Escozíos. He is also a contributor on radio programs on Cadena 100 and National Spanish Radio.

== Career ==
=== Mojinos escozios ===
In 1994, he created the rock band, Mojinos Escozíos, when he met the other members, Vidal Barja Sr., Vidal Barja Jr., Juan Ramón Artero, and Juan Carlos Barja, in Mollet del Vallés, Barcelona. The group has sold more than 2 million albums and performed over 450 concerts in Spain. They have released 12 albums.

=== Radio ===
He has his own program on Spanish radio station Cadena 100 titled La junla hosted by José Antonio Abellán; and another with the famous program Afectos Matinales on National Spanish Radio with Jordi Tuñón and Queralt Flotats.

He was the center of some controversy for comments made on La junla Sálvame's Jorge Javier Vázquez. Vázquez sued Rodriguez for defamation and was awarded €250.00. However, Vazquez was actually only compensated with 10.000 €.

=== Television ===
El Sevilla has appeared on several television programs such as Andreu Buenafuente's La cosa nostra, Jesús Vazquez's La central and as an anchorman on La noche de Fuentes y Cía. by Manel Fuentes. He also made cameos on others productions, including Plats bruts, 7 Vidas, Los Lunnis and Land Rober, and was a panel judge on Gente de primera.

In February 2010 he appeared as a contestant on ¡Más que baile! over Jorge Javier Vazquez's protests. The episode was controversial due to some alleged favouritism toward one of the participants, Belén Esteban: Despite her poor rehearsal and performance, she won.

In 2014 he competed in the fourth season of Tu cara me suena, where he failed to qualify for the finals.

==== Performances on Tu Cara Me Suena ====
Tu cara me suena performances and results
Week	Portraying	Song	Points	Result
Week 1	David Summers	"Venezia"	8	9th place
Week 2	King Louie	"Quiero ser como tú (I Wan'na Be like You)"	10	9th place
Week 3	Jeanette	"Porque te vas"	17	4th place
Week 4	Joaquín Sabina	"Y nos dieron las diez"	15	5th place
Week 5	Zucchero	"Baila morena"	11	8th place
Week 6	Brian Johnson	"Highway to Hell"	20	3rd place
Week 7	Alexander Delgado	"La Gozadera"	12	6th place
Week 8	Tino Fernández	"Comando G (Gatchaman)"	14	6th place
Week 9	Chavela Vargas	"Noche de bodas"	24	1st place
Week 10	Mr Lordi	"Hard Rock Hallelujah"	18	4th place
Week 11	Little Richard	"Tutti Frutti"	10	7th place
Week 12	David Muñoz	"Pastillas para dormir"	13	6th place
Week 13	Huecco	"Pa' mi guerrera"	9	8th place
Week 14	Ana Anguita	"La gallina Cocoguagua"	10	8th place
Week 15 (1st Semi-Final)	Loquillo	"Feo, fuerte y formal"	12	8th place
Week 16 (2nd Semi-Final)	Javier Gurruchaga	"Corazón de neón"	12	7th place
Week 17 (Final)	Yurena	"A por ti" and "No cambié"	Did not qualify	Did not qualify
TOTAL			215	

== Filmography ==
- El Cid: The Legend (2003)
- Isi/Disi. Amor a lo bestia (2004)
- Sinfín (2005)
- Isi/Disi. Alto Voltaje (2006)
- Summer Rain (2006) (uncredited)
- Ekipo Ja (2007)
- Marco (2011)

== Books ==
- Memorias de un Homo Erectus (2003)
- Diario de un Ninja (2004)
- El hombre que hablaba con las ranas (2010)
- La ley de El Sevilla (2012)
