= Mojinos Escozíos =

Spanish comedy rock/metal band

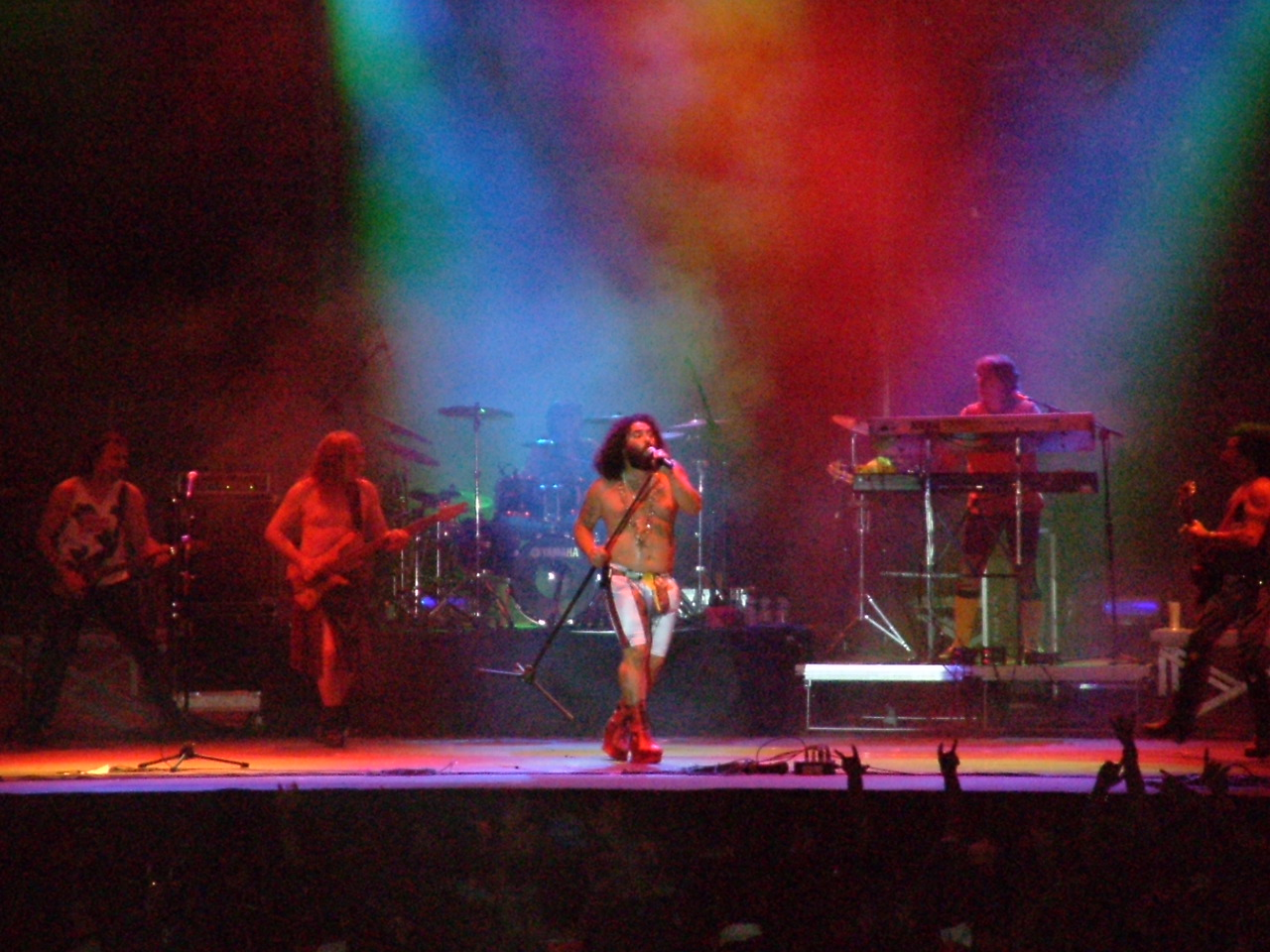

Background information
- Origin: Spain
- Genres: Hard rock Comedy rock Heavy metal
- Years active: 1994 – present
- Labels: Horus, Dro
- Members: El Sevilla (lead vocals); José Carlos Barja "Zippy" (bass guitar and backing vocals); Vidal Varja Jr. "Vidalito" (rhythm guitar and backing vocals); Juan Ramón Artero "Chicho" (lead guitar and backing vocals); Vidal Barja "El Puto" (drums and backing vocals)
- Website: http://www.mojinos.com/

Mojinos Escozíos (Spanish for "Burnt Asses") is a Spanish comedy rock band, mostly significant because of their lyrics on their songs, that may be considered irreverent, humorous, and possibly scatological.

== Style ==
In their songs, the musical influence of the big bands of hard rock and heavy metal like AC/DC, Deep Purple, Iron Maiden and Metallica is appreciable. Their style sounds most like this sound, but some songs are known because of the influence of blues rock on their style.

== Members ==
- Miguel Ángel Rodríguez El Sevilla: Nicknamed for his birthplace, he is the leader of the band, performs the vocals, and is also able of playing wind instruments such as the pan flute and the harmonica, as well as dancing. He is an easily recognizable person by his appearance: he is an obese man with a long curly hair and a bushy beard covering most of his face.
- Juan Ramón Artero Chicho: El Sevilla's childhood friend, he played the lead guitar. In their songs, it was common that El Sevilla would order Chicho to play the guitar solo. He was also capable of acting; in Ópera Rock Triunfo he portrayed a contestant in a television talent show. Chicho died on 26 September 2020.
- José Carlos Barja Zippy: Bass guitar. In their songs he is constantly angry and using foul language. Some in-jokes of the band are that Zippy kills El Sevilla at the end of every album (this was discontinued in 2002), and his anger comes from the fact that he is a cuckold. In their 2008 album, Zippy takes revenge and hooks up with El Sevilla's wife.
- Vidal Barja Sr. El Puto: Drums. He is Zippy's brother and the oldest member of the band, and the only one that does not have long hair because of his hair loss; sometimes he is seen wearing a cap. He often boasts of having a large penis, and allegedly, his nickname, El Puto (English: The Prostitute) comes from the fact that his wife pays him for sex.
- Vidal Barja Jr. Vidalito: Rhythm guitar. He is El Puto's son and the youngest member of the band. Since 2008 he has also become the record producer of the band.

Former members

- Esteve Coll Maestro: Was the record producer of their albums until 2008, and also the pianist when needed. Taught Vidalito to produce records and they produced together their 2007 album.

== Discography ==
1. Mojinos Escozíos (1996)
2. Demasiao perro pa trabajá, demasiao carvo par rocanró (1998)
3. En un cortijo grande el que es tonto se muere de hambre (2000)
4. Las margaritas son flores del campo (2001)
5. Más de 8 millones de discos vendidos (2002)
6. Ópera Rock Triunfo (2003)
7. Semos unos Mostruos (2004)
8. Con cuernos y a lo loco (2005)
9. Diez años escozíos (2006)
10. Pa pito el Mío (2007)
11. Los novios que las madres nunca quisieron para sus hijas y el novio que las hijas nunca quisieron para sus madres (2008)
12. La leyenda de los hombres más guapos del mundo (2010)
13. Mená Chatruá (2011)
14. Semos unos máquinas (2013)
15. Selfi, bragas y rocanró (2015)
16. Maduritos y resultones (2017)
