= Codigo Emprende =

2013 Spanish television series

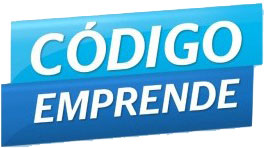
- Genre: Business
- Presented by: Juan Ramón Lucas
- Country of origin: Spain
- Original language: Spanish
- No. of series: 1
- No. of episodes: 7

Production
- Production locations: Valencia, Spain
- Running time: 70 minutes
- Production companies: Televisión Española and BBVA

Original release
- Network: La 1 TVE Internacional
- Release: September 11 – October 23, 2013

Código Emprende (Code Undertake) is a Spanish television series, hosted by Juan Ramón Lucas. The format of the show is owned by Televisión Española and BBVA.

== Programme ==
=== Format ===
The show is a competitive reality television series that allows 6 entrepreneurs an opportunity to present their varying business that are in different evolution stages.

It shows, through personal stories, that any idea can be turned into a project to make a living and aims to promote the idea that in Spain you can create jobs.

It is based on the experiences of 6 new entrepreneurs seeking to get money to create jobs. Advised by a business expert, they will try to improve their projects over 6 weeks to convince a jury, that will award one of them a prize of 100,000 euros.

In those 6 weeks, the show depicts the entrepreneurs lives, so that the audience get to know their stories and who is on their sides. They witness their struggle to bring up an idea, enjoy their triumphs and their failures feel that their lives make us very close.

In each of the chapters, participants will undergo a special tests that are sometimes very hard. They all meet to do exercises typical of business management courses: outdoor workouts (survival, rafting, communication in extreme conditions), actual sales simulations, and have experiences as workers in sectors that has nothing to do with theirs.

== Team ==
=== Production ===
Produced by Spanish Television in collaboration with producer CI Communicación, with the support of BBVA as a cultural sponsor.

- Presenter and producer: Juan Ramón Lucas.
- Coach: Carles Torrecilla – professor at ESADE.

=== Jury ===
- María Benjumea – Infoempleo president and director of Spain Startup.
- Paloma Cabello – MIT Enterprise Forum Spain president.
- Gustavo Vinacua – director of the BBVA Innovation Center.

=== Entrepreneurs ===
The 6 finalists were 'ordinary people'; 3 women and 3 men, from more than 2,000 applicants.

Entrepreneur	Origin (and residence)	Age	Project
Aitor Grandes	San Sebastián / Madrid	36 years	24 Symbols – flat rate eBook platform
Alejandro Fanjul	Gijón / Zaragoza	33 years	Palbin – online shops for SMEs
Álvaro de la Rocha	Cartagena	32 years	Tu chico de los recados (Spanish for 'your gofer') – delivery with ecological tricycles
Elisabet Cuenca	Barcelona	36 years	OpenDomo Services – home automation systems
María Cózar	Valencia	30 years	María Cózar Couture – female fashion designer
Rocío "Ro" Muñoz	Sevilla / Madrid	37 years	Real Fábrica Española – authentic Spanish products store
