= Jorge Luengo =

Spanish magician and illusionist

Jorge Luengo (born 18 February 1984 in Cáceres) is a Spanish magician and illusionist, known as the "World Champion of Illusion" (Spanish: Campeón del Mundo de Ilusionismo). Luengo has won the FISM Championship of Magic (Invention category) in Beijing in 2009.

His first performances took place when he was only 15 and just two years later, he began performing weekly. At 18, he started studying the first out of his three Engineering degrees.

At the age of 20, he began acting in a number of theatres. Since then he has been invited to several magic events throughout Europe, having already performed at Louvre Museum in Paris, at Pierre Baudis Congress Centre in Toulouse and at O2 Arena in Prague.

Luengo worked as a math teacher for almost three years before devoting himself exclusively to magic. Since then he has appeared on many TV shows. He also hypnotized many famous people all around the world like Marc Márquez

In 2012 he has been cast as the voice of a young magician in Sorcery, a Sony videogame for PlayStation 3, where the main character has a white lock of hair as well. In 2018, he participates as a teacher on the Spanish series Pura magia.

As an illusionist, mentalist, magician and lecturer, he has also participated in different national television programmes and has performed for personalities such as the Spanish royal family, Rafael Nadal, Cristiano Ronaldo, Joaquín Sabina, Alejandro Sanz, Cristina Pedroche and Carlos Baute.

On television, he has collaborated in the programmes Todo Va Bien, ¡Qué tiempo tan feliz!, Cabaret Olé, Hermano mayor, Hoy cocinas tú, Las mañanas de la 1 and his own programme Desafío Mental on the DMAX (Spanish TV channel). As a guest, he has also participated in Masterchef, Zapeando and Pasapalabra, both during his time on Telecinco and Antena 3.

In 2018 he published the book Supertrucos mentales para la vida diaria.

In 2019 and 2020 he presented two magic specials, 'La Estrella de la Navidad' and 'La Magia del Amor' on Telemadrid. He has also participated in various programmes on Canal Extremadura such as 'Extremadura Mágica' and 'Sígueme'.

Since January 2021 he has been a regular contributor to the programme 'El show de Bertín' on Canal Sur.

== Awards ==
In 2006 he attended to the French National Magic Congress, organized by the FFAP, where he won his first national award. Two years later, he was awarded first prize at Spanish National Magic Award. In 2009 he entered the World Championship of Magic in Beijing, also known as the Magic Olympics, where he was awarded an FISM Award and a World Magic Award, and was the only winner in the Invention category, the Gold Medal of Magic.

He has been subsequently awarded:

- French National.
- First prize at Spanish National Magic Award.
- Invention Award Winner of Magic in Beijing.
- The prize "Most talented man" in Brussels 2010
- Prize "De Pura Cepa" best magician of the year
