= Quique Dacosta =

Spanish chef

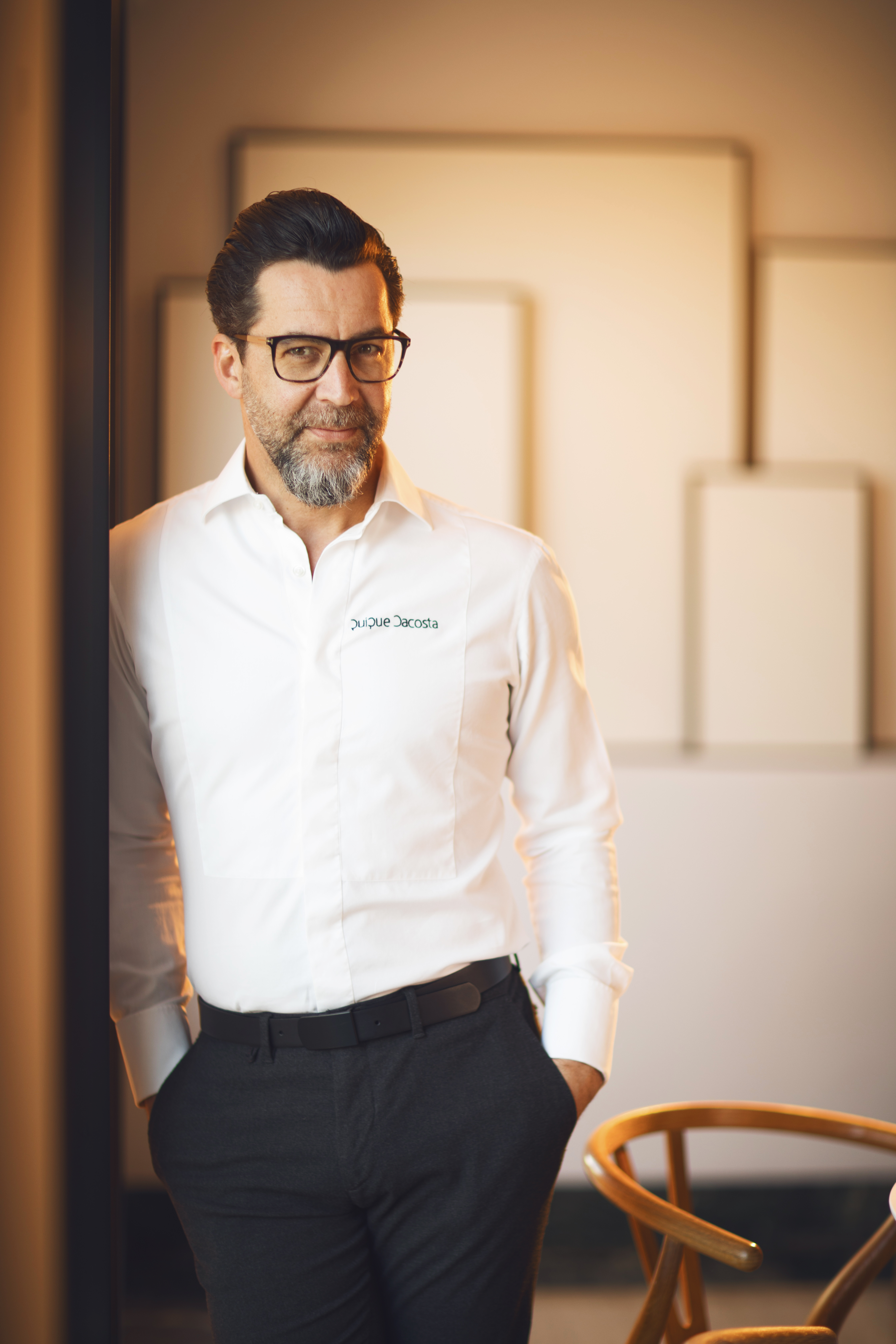
Quique Dacosta

Quique Dacosta is a Spanish chef. He began his professional career as a chef in 1986. In 1988, he joined the team at the restaurant that would later become Quique Dacosta Restaurante.

== Career ==
Dacosta serves as the director and culinary creator of the Hotel Mandarin Oriental Ritz in Madrid, where Deessa, one of his restaurants, earned its first Michelin star just seven months after opening.

Dacosta has received numerous accolades, including the Gold Medal for Merit in the Fine Arts and the title of Best Spanish Restaurateur from the Royal Gastronomic Academy. His cuisine draws inspiration from the Mediterranean Sea and the Montgó Natural Park.

In addition to his work at the Mandarin Oriental, Dacosta founded ArrosQD, a restaurant based in London, and owns several other establishments, including El Poblet, Llisa negra, Vuelve Carolina, and Mercatbar. He has also published a recipe book titled De Tapas con Quique Dacosta, which features 80 recipes from his restaurants.

== Restaurants ==
Chef and Owner of:

- "Quique Dacosta Restaurant" in Denia (3* Michelin Stars and 3 Repsol Suns)
- "El Poblet" (2* Michelin Stars and 2 Repsol Suns)
- Deessa (2* Michelin star). Mandarin Oriental Ritz, Madrid
- "Vuelve Carolina" (1 Repsol Sun)
- "Mercat Bar" in Valencia
- "Llisa Negra" in Valencia
- "Arrosqd" in London
- Palm Court. Mandarin Oriental Ritz, Madrid
- El Jardín del Ritz. Mandarin Oriental Ritz, Madrid
- Champagne Bar. Mandarin Oriental Ritz, Madrid
- Pictura. Mandarin Oriental Ritz, Madrid
- "Quique Dacosta Delivery" in Spain, distribute foods

== Awards ==
- Gold Medal for Merit in the Fine Arts 2020
- Best Spanish Restaurateur by the Royal Gastronomic Academy, 2019
- Doctor Honoris Causa by the faculty of Fine Arts of the Miguel Hernández University of Elche.
- (Ranks 39) in The World's 50 Best Restaurants, 2015 by prestigious magazine The Restaurant.
- Best Restaurant in Europe according to Opinionated About Dining 2012 and 2013.
- National Prize for Gastronomy, awarded by The Spanish Royal Academy of Gastronomy, 2005 and 2009.
- Millesime Chef Award 2013.
- 3 Michelin stars since 2012.

== See also ==
- Local food
