= Jordi Cruz =

Spanish chef

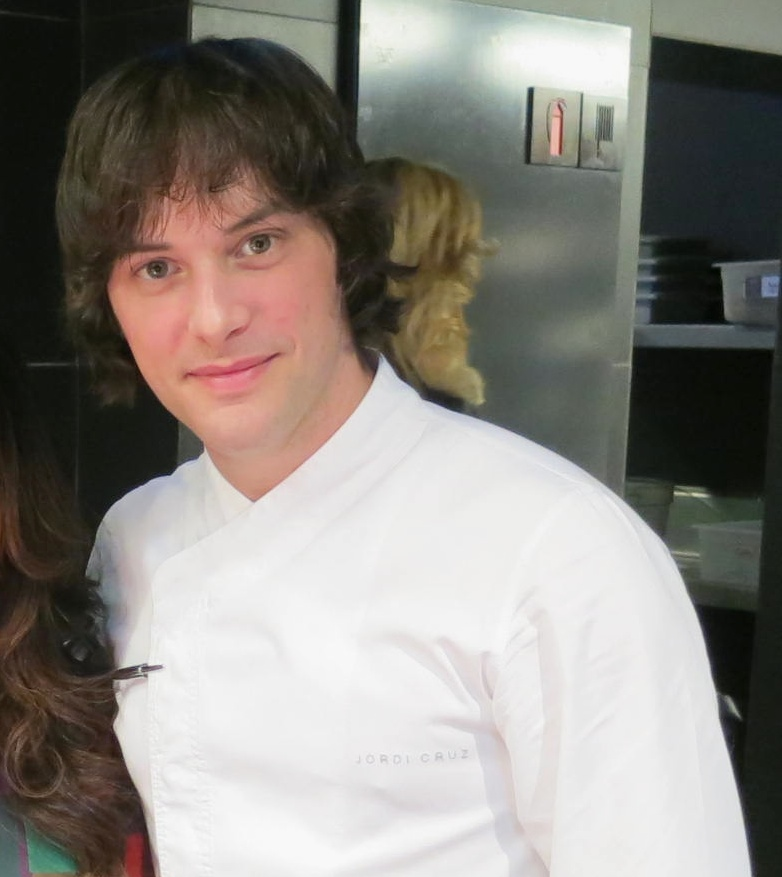
- Born: Jordi Cruz Mas; 29 June 1978 (age 46); Manresa (Barcelona) Spain
- Education: Escuela Superior de Hostelería de Manresa
- Spouse: Rebecca Lima
- Culinary career
- Cooking style: Spanish
- Rating(s): Michelin stars
- Current restaurant(s): ABaC, Barcelona; L'Angle, Barcelona; Ten's Barcelona, Barcelona; A Tempo, Barcelona
- Television show(s): MasterChef (Spanish TV series) (2013-present)
- Website: jordicruzmas.com

Jordi Cruz Mas (born June 29, 1978 in Manresa, Barcelona) is a Spanish chef. He is considered one of the best chefs in Spain and directs ABaC kitchen in Barcelona.

== Early life and career ==
Cruz completed his studies in the Escuela Superior de Hostelería de Manresa, located in Manresa. At the age of 14, he began to work in the restaurant Estany Clar de Cercs (Barcelona), where he received his first Michelin Star in November 2004, making him at 26 years old the youngest chef in Spain and the second youngest in the world to receive this distinction.
