= List of programs broadcast by Cuatro =

This is a list of programs currently, formerly, and soon to be broadcast on the TV network Cuatro, in Spain.

Original title	Performers / hosts	Years	Genre
1 Equipo	Pablo Carbonell	2005–2006	Game Show
20p	Josep Lobató	2009	Game Show
21 días	Samanta Villar / Adela Úcar / Meritxell Martorell	2009–2016	Reality television
Los 4 de Cuatro	Javier Coronas	2005	
6 Pack	Virginia Martínez and Pilar Rubio	2005–2006	Documentary
9 meses con Samanta	Samanta Villar	2016	Reality television
A cara de perro	Javier García Roche	2017	News
A simple vista	Paz Padilla	2021	Game Show
Ácaros	Paco León	2006–2007	Sitcom
Adán y Eva	Mónica Martínez	2014–2015	Reality television
Adivina qué hago esta noche	Santi Millán	2019–2020	Talent show
Ajuste de cuentas	Vicens Castellano	2008–2009	
¡Allá tú!	Jesús Vázquez	2011	Game Show
Alta tensión	Luis Larrodera, Christian Gálvez	2006–2008; 2021-2022	Game Show
Amistades peligrosas	Daniel Grao	2006	Drama series
Amor en la red	Aitor Trigos	2006	Dating show
Amores perros		2016	Reality television
Baila conmigo	Nagore Robles	2022	Dating show
Bake Off España	Jesús Vázquez	2019	Talent show
La Batalla de los coros	Josep Lobató	2009	Reality television
Bienvenidos a mi hotel	María Gómez	2018	Game Show
Billete a Brasil	Julian Iantzi	2011	Game Show
Boom	Christian Gálvez	2024-	Quiz Show
Brainiac	Julián Iantzi and Manuela Velasco	2007–2008	Game Show
El Bribón	Pablo Chiapella	2019–2020	Game Show
Bribones. En el corazón de la aventura		2024	Documentary
Cabo Vadillo	Pablo Vadillo	2014	Reality television
Caiga quien caiga	Ana Milán	2010	Documentary
Callejeros		2005–2014	Documentary
Callejeros viajeros		2009–2013	Documentary
El Campamento	Pedro García Aguado	2010	Coach show
La Casa de cristal	Ana García Lozano	2006	Reality television
Channel nº4	Ana García Siñeriz and Boris Izaguirre	2005–2008	Variety Show
Chester	Risto Mejide / Pepa Bueno	2014–2019: 2023-¿?	Talk Show
Chicas en la ciudad		2005	Drama series
Chófer de Ruiz-Mateos, El		2022	Documentary
Ciega a citas	Teresa Hurtado de Ory and Álex Gadea	2014	Drama series
Ciento y la madre	Patricia Conde	2014	Comedy
Cintora a pie de calle	Jesús Cintora	2016	News
Circus, más difícil todavía	Josep Lobató	2008	Reality television
Coca-Cola Music Experience	Tony Aguilar	2014	Music
Código 10	Davis Alemán and Nacho Abad	2023-¿?	News
El Comecocos	Ruth Jiménez	2011	Game Show
El Concurso del Año	Dani Martínez	2018-2021	Game Show
Conexión Samanta	Samanta Villar	2010–2016	Reality television
Corta-t	Adrián Lastra and Andrea Dueso	2005–2009	Comedy
Crónica Cuatro	Ane Ibarzábal	2017	Music
Cuarto milenio	Iker Jiménez, Carmen Porter	2005 – ¿?	Science
Cuatro al día	Carme Chaparro, Joaquín Prat	2019 – ¿?	News
Cuatro x Cuatro	Iñaki Gabilondo, Jon Sistiaga, Carles Francino, Àngels Barceló	2006	News
Cuatro Weddings	Teté Delgado	2018	Reality
Cuatrosfera	Manuela Velasco and Kira Miró	2005–2007	Variety Show
El Cubo	Raquel Sánchez Silva	2012	Game Show
Dale al REC	Ruth Jiménez	2011–2012	
Dame una pista	Luján Argüelles	2010–2011	Game Show
Dani & Flo	Dani Martínez, Florentino Fernández and Lara Álvarez	2017–2018	Comedy
Deja sitio para el postre	Raquel Sánchez Silva	2014	Cooking show
Del 40 al 1	Frank Blanco and Manuela Velasco	2005	
Desafío extremo	Jesús Calleja	2007–2014	Adventure
Desnudas	Juanjo Oliva	2007	Reality television
Diario de	Mercedes Milá	2011–2014	Documentary
Donde menos te lo esperas	Santi Millán	2019	Dating show
Dreamland	Natalia Millán	2014	Drama Series
Duelo de chefs	Iria Castro and Juan Pozuelo	2006	Cooking show
Elígeme	Carlos Baute	2009	Dating show
En boca de todos	Diego Losada	2022-	Variety Show
En busca del Nirvana	Raúl Gómez	2023-2024	Reality Show
En el punto de mira	Diego Losada	2016-2022	Documentary
En guardia. Mujeres contra el crimen		2024-	Documentary
En la caja		2014	Documentary
Entre rejas		2014	Reality television
La Escalera	Carmen Carcelén	2011	Coaching
El Especialista	Tony González and José Cáceres	2005	Coaching
Espíritu salvaje	Andoni Canela and Meritxell Margarit	2017	Documentary
Éstas no son las noticias	Quequé	2008–2009	Comedy
Los Exitosos Pells	Miguel Barberá	2009	Sitcom
Expedición Imposible	Raquel Sánchez Silva	2013	Reality television
Factor X	Nuria Roca	2007–2008	Talent show
Fama, ¡a bailar!	Paula Vázquez and Tania Llasera	2008–2011	Talent show
Fama Revolution	Paula Vázquez	2010	Talent show
Fama School	Paula Vázquez	2008	Talent show
Family Rock	Nico Abad	2006	Game Show
Feis to feis	Joaquín Reyes	2016	Talk Show
Fiesta fiesta		2010	Documentary
Fifty Fifty	Silvia Jato	2008	Game Show
First Dates	Carlos Sobera	2016 – ¿?	Dating Show
First Dates: Crucero	Carlos Sobera	2020	Dating Show
Focus		2023	Documentary
Fogones lejanos		2014	Cooking show
Football Cracks	Nico Abad	2010	Sports
Frank de la jungla	Frank Cuesta	2010–2013	Documentary
Frikiliks	David Fernández and Ana Morgade	2011	Comedy
Fuera de cobertura	Alejandra Andrade	2016-2019; 2023- ¿?	Documentary
Futura	Carmen Porter	2022	Science
Gente de mente	Antonio Garrido	2007	Game Show
Los Gipsy Kings		2015 – ¿?	Reality television
El Gran Quiz	Nuria Roca	2008	Game Show
Granjero busca esposa	Luján Argüelles / Carlos Lozano	2009–2018	Reality television
Gran Slam	Nico Abad and Nuria Roca	2007	Game Show
Guasabi	Eva Hache	2015	Comedy
Gym Tony	Antonia San Juan, Patricia Conde, Santi Rodríguez and Iván Massagué	2014–2016	Sitcom
Gym Tony LC	David Amor	2017	Sitcom
La Habitación del pánico	Núria Marín	2020	Variety Show
Hay alguien ahí	Sonia Castelo	2009–2010	Drama series
Hazlo tú mismo	Héctor Binefa	2005	
Hazte un selfi	Uri Sàbat and Adriana Abenia	2016–2017	News
Hermano mayor	Pedro García Aguado	2009–2017	Reality television
Héroes, más allá del deber		2017–2020	Reality television
Hijos de papá	Luján Argüelles	2011	Reality television
Hipódromo		2007	
Horizonte	Íker Jiménez	2021– ¿?	Investigative
El Hormiguero	Pablo Motos	2006–2011	Variety Show
Humor Amarillo	Paco Bravo y Fernando Costilla	2006–2007	Comedy
Informe Cuatro	Jon Sistiaga	2005	News
La Incubadora de los negocios	Raquel Sanchez Silva	2013– 2014	Talent Show
Inteligencia artificial	Luján Arguelles	2013–2014	Variety Show
La Isla de los nominados	Arturo Valls	2010	Sitcom
Iumiuky		2020 – ¿?	Public Service
Justo a tiempo	Iñaki López	2010	Game Show
Kevin Spencer		2005-???	Comedy
Ke no!	Joel Bosqued	2005	Comedy
Killer Karaoke	Florentino Fernández and Patricia Conde	2014	Talent show
La línea roja	Jesús Cintora	2017	Talk Show
Lo que diga la rubia	Luján Argüelles	2010	Actuality show
Lo sabe, no lo sabe	Juanra Bonet	2012–2013	Game Show
Love On Top		2018	Reality television
Madres adolescentes	Pilar Lapastora de Mingo	2008	Docu coach
Malas pulgas	Borja Capponi	2010–2012	Docu coach
Las Mañanas de Cuatro	Concha García Campoy, Marta Fernández, Jesús Cintora and Javier Ruiz	2006–2018	Variety Show
Maracaná 05	Paco González, Michael Robinson and Carlos Latre	2005–2006	Sports
Martínez y Hermanos	Dani Martínez	2024-2025	Late Night
Matinal Cuatro	Ana García Siñeriz	2010	News
Matrimonio con hijos	Ginés García Millán	2006	Sitcom
Me cambio de apellido		2018	Reality
Me cambio de familia		2011–2013	Reality
La Mesa del coronel	Pedro Baños	2019	Talk Show
El Método Osmin	Osmin Hernández	2014	Coaching
Mzungu, Operación Congo	José Antonio Ruiz Díez	2020	Reality television
Mi madre cocina mejor que la tuya	Sergio Fernández & María Jiménez Latorre	2014	Cooking show
Miedos de..., Los		2022	Reality Show
Mis raíces	Isabel Jiménez	2025	Talk Show
Misión exclusiva	Sergio Garrido	2018	Documentary
Money, Money	Josep Lobató	2007–2008	Game Show
Money time	Luján Arguelles	2013	Game Show
Mónica y el sexo	Mónica Naranjo	2019	Documentary
Mujeres y Hombres y Viceversa	Emma García y Toñi Moreno	2018 – ¿?	Dating Show
El Mundo de Chema	Carlos Latre	2006	Comedy
Nada x aquí	Jorge Blass	2006–2008	
Natural Frank	Frank Cuesta	2013–2014	
Negocia como puedas	Miguel Martín and Raúl Gómez	2013	Game Show
Negocios al límite	Beatriz de la Iglesia	2014	Coaching
La Noche americana	Juan Carlos Ortega	2007	Late night
Noche Cuatro	Raquel Sánchez Silva	2005	Variety Show
Noche Hache	Eva Hache	2005–2008	Late show
No le digas a mamá que trabajo en la tele	Goyo Jiménez, Lorena Castell y Dani Rovira	2011	Variety Show
Nos pierde la fama	Nuria Roca	2006	Variety show
Noticias Cuatro	Iñaki Gabilondo	2005–2019, 2024–¿?	News
Las Noticias de las 2	Silvia Abril and Ana Morgade	2011	Comedy
Las noticias del guiñol		2005–2008	Comedy
O el perro o yo	Victoria Stilwell	2008	Reality television
¡Oído Cocina!		2005–2006	Science
Ola Ola		2008–2010	Documentary
La Otra red	Javier Ruiz	2014–2015	Talk show
Padres lejanos	Manuel Díaz González	2012	Reality television
Palabra de gitano	Jacobo Eireos	2013	Reality television
Partido a partido	Manu Carreño	2014	Sports
Pasaporte Pampliega	Antonio Pampliega	2018–2019	Documentary
Password	Luján Argüelles and Ana Milán	2008–2010	Game Show
Pecadores	Mónica Martínez	2015–2015	Talk show
Pekín Express	Paula Vázquez, Raquel Sánchez Silva y Jesús Vázquez	2008–2011	Reality television
Perdidos en la ciudad	Nuria Roca and Raquel Sánchez Silva	2011–2013	Reality television
Perdidos en la tribu	Nuria Roca and Raquel Sánchez Silva	2009–2012	Reality television
Planeta Calleja	Jesús Calleja	2014 – ¿?	Variety Show
Policía internacional	Luis Troya y Mercedes Forner	2014	Documentary
Ponte verde	Raquel Sánchez Silva	2007	Science
¡Qué desperdicio!	Raquel Sánchez Silva	2007	News
¿Qué hago yo aquí?	Elena Ortega	2013	Documentary
¿Quién quiere casarse con mi hijo?	Luján Argüelles	2012–2017	Reality television
¿Quién quiere casarse con mi madre?	Luján Argüelles	2013–2014	Reality television
Quiero ser monja		2016	Reality Show
Rabia	Carles Francino and Patricia Vico	2015–2015	Drama Series
Reforma sorpresa	Nuria Roca	2009	Reality television
Los relojes del diablo	Álvaro Cervantes	2021	Drama Series
Los Reyes del barrio		2018	Reality television
Río Salvaje	Kike Calleja	2016 - ¿?	Documentary
Rompecorazones	Deborah Ombres	2005	Game Show
Samanta y...	Samanta Villar	2017–2018	Reality television
Samanta y la vida de...	Samanta Villar	2020	Reality television
Singles XD	Nuria Roca	2017	Dating Show
Salta a la vista	Roberto Vilar	2011–2012	Game Show
Saturday Night Live	Eva Hache	2009	Comedy
Selva en casa, La	Frank Cuesta	2011–2012	Documentary
Sex Academy	Marian Frías	2012	Variety Show
Sexómetro, El	Nuria Roca and Josep Lobató	2007–2008	Variety Show
Snacks de tele	César Toral y Eli Martín	2017	Comedy
Sopa de gansos	Florentino Fernández and Dani Martínez	2015	Comedy
SOS Adolescentes	Ana Isabel	2007–2008	Documentary
Soy el que más sabe de televisión del mundo	Nico Abad	2005–2006	Game Show
Soy lo que como	Raquel Sánchez Silva	2007	Science
Soy Noticia	Nacho Medina	2016	Documentary
Suárez y Mariscal, caso cerrado	Susana Suárez y Santiago Mariscal	2005	Drama series
Superhuman	Raquel Sánchez Silva	2006	Game Show
Supermodelo	Judit Mascó	2006–2008	Variety Show
Supernanny	Rocío Ramos-Paúl	2006–2017	Reality television
Surferos TV		2005–2007	Zapping
Las Tardes de Cuatro	Marta Fernández	2012	Variety Show
Te falta un viaje	Paz Padilla	2023-2024	Travel Show
Te vas a enterar	Ana Rodríguez Martí y Álvaro de la Lama	2012–2013	News
Los teloneros	Antonio Castelo	2021	Comedy
Territorio Pampliega	Antonio Pampliega	2005	Documentary
The Wall	Jesús Cintora	2013	News
Tempo al tiempo	Mario Picazo	2024	Science
Tienes 1 minuto	Lujan Argüelles	2011	Dating show
Tienes Talento	Nuria Roca and Eduardo Aldán	2008	Talent show
Tiki-Taka	Felipe del Campo	2013–2014	Sports
Todo es mentira	Risto Mejide	2019 – ¿?	News
Todo es verdad	Risto Mejide and Marta Flich	2021–2022	Talk show
Todo va bien	Edurne and Xavi Rodríguez	2014–2015	Comedy
Todos contra el chef	Vanessa Martyn	2005–2007	Cooking show
Toma partido	Miguel Ángel Oliver	2016	Talk Show
Tonterías las justas	Florentino Fernández	2010–2011	Comedy
El Traidor	Sergio Muñiz	2006	Reality television
Tu vista favorita	Nuria Roca	2010	Variety Show
Tú yo y mi avatar	Luján Argüelles	2017	Dating show
Un tiempo nuevo	Silvia Intxaurrondo	2015	Talk show
Un príncipe para...	Luján Arguelles	2013–2014	Reality television
Uno para ganar	Jesús Vázquez	2011–2012	Game Show
UAU!	Santi Millán	2010	Late night
Valientes	Marco de Paula	2010	Drama series
Vaya tropa	Arturo Valls	2009–2010	Comedy
Ven a cenar conmigo	Luis Larrodera	2017 – 2021	Cooking show
Ven a cenar conmigo: Gourmet edition	Luis Larrodera	2018-2021	Cooking show
Viajeros Cuatro		2018 – ¿?	Documentary
La Vida con Samanta	Samanta Villar	2019	Reality television
Vidas contadas		2005	Documentary
Visto y Oído	Raquel Sánchez Silva and Joaquín Prat	2008	Variety Show
Volando voy	Jesús Calleja	2015 – ¿?	Documentary
WAGS, ellas también juegan		2023	Docu-reality
El Xef	David Muñoz	2016	Cooking show
