= Horizonte (TV programme) =

Spanish investigation television program

- Genre: Investigation, divulgation
- Directed by: Iker Jiménez
- Presented by: Iker Jiménez
- Starring: Iker Jiménez; Carmen Porter; Pablo Fuente; César Carballo
- Country of origin: Spain
- Original language: Spanish
- No. of seasons: 1
- No. of episodes: 19

Production
- Executive producer: Mediaset España

Original release
- Network: Telecinco (2020–2021); Cuatro (2021–present)
- Release: September 17, 2020

Related
- Cuarto milenio

Horizonte (Horizon in English) is a Spanish television program directed and presented by journalist Iker Jiménez. It premiered in 2020 as a program dedicated to the COVID-19 pandemic, owing its existence to a similar monograph in Jiménez's main program Cuarto Milenio, though later expanding to other relevant topics, like politics, science and investigative journalism, in 2021. It was broadcast in Telecinco's prime time with high audience ratings, reaching near three millions viewers in its fifth episode, before being moved to the same niche in Cuatro.

== History ==
In March 2020, mystery investigation program Cuarto Milenio became notorious due to a series of episodes broadcast in February, dedicated to the then incipient COVID-19 pandemic, in which several boards of guest experts accurately predicted the national impact that it would go on to have. Among the guests there were physicians and scientists like Tomás Camacho, Miguel Ángel Pertierra, José Miguel Gaona, Julio Mayol, César Carballo and Javier Cantón, as well as communicators of geopolitics like Col. Pedro Baños and Pablo Fuente, all of which were periodically invited to the program. Media impact in Spain was such that, when Cuarto Milenio put its broadcast on hiatus due to the situation, its director Iker Jiménez had to dispel rumors of political censorship exerted by the Spanish government, whose management of the pandemic had been strongly criticized in the program.

In September, to accompany its return to television, Cuarto Milenio produced a special, two-part episode dedicated to continue gathering information about the COVID-19 pandemic. The first part was titled Origen and broadcast on 6 September, doubling Cuarto Milenio's usual audience ratings with a 13.3% share, while next week it followed Horizonte with 11.6%. Due to the episodes' success, the channel promoved the creation of an independent program where the team would keep addressing the pandemic, bringing again the usual experts from Cuarto Milenio along with new guests. The initially named Informe Covid con Iker Jiménez premiered on 24 September, achieving similar ratings, and its broadcast became weekly, in parallel to that of Cuarto Milenio. On 22 October it changed its name to Horizonte: Informe Covid, achieving that night its maximum ratings thanks to a video interview, the first in continental Europe, with controversial Chinese virologost Li-Meng Yan. The following episode gathered a board to analyze her claims.

Started 2021, from a special episode on 7 January onwards, the program stopped focusing solely on the pandemic and spread its range to other fields of science and politics, including a reportage about big data and media manipulation in social platforms. The program was moved from Telecinco to Cuatro next week, shortening its title to Horizonte and making Informe Covid a segment, and made its debut in the new channel with a live analysis of the inauguration of Joe Biden in United States. In March 2023, another moment of relevance happened during a coverage of President of El Salvador Nayib Bukele, when one of the guests revealed that Bukele was watching the show.

== Team ==
=== Hosts ===
- Iker Jiménez (direction and presentation)
- Carmen Porter (direction and co-presentation)
- Pablo Fuente (direction and co-presentation)

=== Guests (Informe Covid) ===
- José Alcamí (virologist and microbiologist, Instituto de Salud Carlos III)
- Francois Balloux (biologist, University College London)
- Pedro Baños (Ejército de Tierra Colonel)
- Tomás Camacho (physician and toxicologist, Análisis Clínicos Vithas Lab)
- Carmen Cámara (physician and immunologist, Spanish Society for Immunology)
- Javier Cantón (virologist, Medialab UGR)
- César Carballo (physician, Hospital Universitario Ramón y Cajal)
- Simon Clarke (microbiologist, Reading University)
- Alfredo Corell (immunologist, Spanish Society for Immunology)
- José Miguel Gaona (psychiatrist, European Psychiatric Association)
- Toni García Arias (schoolteacher)
- Fernando García-Sala (physician, Sociedad Española de Pediatría)
- Adolfo García-Sastre (physician, Mount Sinai Hospital)
- Amós García Rojas (epidemiologist, Asociación Española de Vacunología)
- Marc Gil (paramedic)
- África González (immunologist, Centro de Investigaciones Biomédicas)
- José Luis Jiménez (chemist, University of Colorado)
- Yuan Lee (journalist and activist)
- Richard Lessells (physician, KwaZulu-Natal University)
- Daniel López Acuña (epidemiologist)
- Salvador Macip (biologist, Leicester University)
- Manuel Martínez-Sellés (physician, Colegio de Médicos de Madrid)
- José María Martín Moreno (epidemiologist, Harvard University)
- Luis Enrique Martín Otero (Ejército de Tierra Colonel, Red Española de Laboratorios de Alerta Biológica)
- Li-Meng Yan (virologist, Hong Kong University)
- Martin Michaelis (pharmacist, Kent University)
- María Montoya (virologist and immunologist, Spanish National Research Council)
- Muhammad Munir (virologist, Lancaster University)
- Luke O'Neill (biochemist, Trinity College Dublin)
- Paolo Palma (immunologist, Bambino Gesù Hospital)
- Miguel Ángel Pertierra (physician, Colegio de Médicos de Málaga)
- Miguel Pita (biologist, Universidad Autónoma de Madrid)
- Kaled Safadi (physician, Safadi Group)
- Tomás Segura (neurologist, Hospital Universitario de Albacete)
- José Antonio Trujillo (physician, Colegio de Médicos de Málaga)
- Fernando Uribarri (physician, Hospital San Rafael)

=== Guests (other) ===
- José Luis Barceló Mezquita (journalist)
- Alán Barroso (YouTuber)
- Juan Bordera (environmental activist)
- Sergio Candanedo (YouTuber)
- Antonio Miguel Carmona (analyst and economist)
- Laura Cuesta (analyst, Universidad Camilo José Cela)
- Jano García (analyst and economist)
- Pilar García de la Granja (journalist)
- Vicente Garrido (criminologist and psychologist)
- Serafín Giraldo (Unión Federal de Policía)
- Judith Hidalgo (economist, ACTUA)
- Jesús Miguel Ibáñez Godoy (physicist, University of Granada)
- Maite Mompó (environmental activist)
- Álex N. Lachhein (naturalist)
- Selva Orejón (judicial expert and analyst, University of Barcelona)
- Gullermo Rocafort (lawyer and economist)
- Nicolás Rodríguez (analyst, Dathos Proyectos y Big Data)
- Dani el Rojo (writer and actor, former mafia boss)
- Roenlared (YouTuber)
- Antonio Tovar (researcher, Instituto de Ciencias Marinas de Andalucía)
- Enrique de Vicente (journalist and sociologist)
- Wall Street Wolverine (YouTuber)
- Jordi Wild (YouTuber)
