= 2009 in Spanish television =

This is a list of Spanish television related events in 2009.

== Events ==
- Unknown: TV channel Castilla–La Mancha TV 2 starts broadcasting.
- 2 February: TV channel tvG2 starts broadcasting.
- 3 February: TV channel Nou 24 starts broadcasting.
- 9 March: TV channel CyL7 (later known as CyLTV and La 7) starts broadcasting.
- 8 April: The government of Spain gives the green light to pay-pre-view digital terrestrial television.
- 18 May: TV channel La Siete starts broadcasting.
- 5 June: PRISA and Mediapro sign an agreement about broadcasting rights of La Liga football matches.
- 29 July: The Senate of Spain passes the new TVE Financing Act, forbidding advertisement on public television.
- 14 August: TV channel Hogar 10 starts broadcasting.
- 29 August: TV channel Canal+ Liga starts broadcasting.
- 18 October: TV channel SX3 starts broadcasting.
- 24 November: Alberto Oliart is appointed president of RTVE.
- 18 December: Telecinco and Cuatro merge in a new group with 81.7% share of the first and 18'3% for PRISA.

== Debuts ==
Title	Channel	Debut	Performers/Host	Genre
20p	Cuatro	2009– 03-30	Josep Lobato	Quiz Show
21 días.	Cuatro	2009– 01-30		Docudrama
23-F: El día más difícil del Rey.	TVE-1	2009– 02-10	Lluís Homar	TV-Movie
23-F: Historia de una traición.	Antena 3	2009– 02-09		TV-Movie
90-60-90, diario secreto de una adolescente.	Antena 3	2009– 09-07	Esmeralda Moya	Drama Series
A fondo: Zona Cero	Antena 3	2009– 04-15		News Magazine
¡A ver si llego!	Telecinco	2009– 01-265	Miriam Díaz-Aroca	Sitcom
Acusados.	Telecinco	2009– 01-28	José Coronado	Drama Series
Águila Roja.	TVE-1	2009– 02-19	David Janer	Drama Series
Animales secundarios.	La Sexta	2009– 03-29		Science/Culture
Asalto al furgón del dinero.	Telecinco	2009– 07-30		Game Show
Callejeros viajeros	Cuatro	2009– 04-26		Travel Show
Cambio de rumbo.	Antena 3	2009– 05-31		Documentary
Canta si puedes	Antena 3	2009– 12–31	Jorge Fernández	Music
Cuestión de peso	Antena 3	2009– 04-13	Cristina Lasvignes	Reality Show
Curso del 63	Antena 3	2009– 10-06		Reality Show
De buena ley	Telecinco	2009– 05-04	Sandra Barneda	Court Show
De repente, los Gómez	Telecinco	2009– 10–13	Alicia Borrachero	Sitcom
Decídete	Antena 3	2009– 11–23	Susana Molina	Talk Show
Decora.	Antena 3	2009– 04-18	Óscar Martínez	Variety Show
Dejadnos solos	Telecinco	2009– 12–23	Paz Padilla	Comedy
Doctor Mateo.	Antena 3	2009– 02-22	Gonzalo de Castro	Sitcom
El Aprendiz	La Sexta	2009– 09-28	Luis Bassat	Reality Show
El Bloke. Coslada Cero.	TVE-1	2009– 07-01		Miniseries
El porvenir es largo	TVE-1	2009– 03-19	Silvia Marsó	Drama Series
El programa de Berto	La Sexta	2009– 03-15	Berto Romero	Comedy
El revientaprecios	Telecinco	2009– 08-15	Miquel Serra	Quiz Show
El secreto	Antena 3	2009– 06-03		Docudrama
El topo	Telecinco	2009– 06-25	Emilio Pineda	Quiz Show
Elígeme.	Cuatro	2009– 03-30	Carlos Baute	Game Show
Ell@s.	Antena 3	2009– 02-23		Sitcom
Españoles en el mundo.	TVE-1	2009– 02-23		Travel Show
Factor ADN	Telecinco	2009– 07-28	Lucía Riaño	Talk Show
¡Fibrilando!	Telecinco	2009– 09-13	Arturo Valls	Comedy
G-20.	Telecinco	2009– 09-03	Risto Mejide	Variety Show
Granjero busca esposa	Cuatro	2009– 01-12	Luján Argüelles	Dating Show
Guerra de sesos	Telecinco	2009– 03-30	Jesús Vázquez	Game Show
Hay alguien ahí.	Cuatro	2009– 03-16	Sonia Castelo	Drama Series
Hermano mayor	Cuatro	2009– 04-24	Pedro García Aguado	Docudrama
La batalla de los coros	Cuatro	2009– 01-08	Josep Lobató	Reality Show
La Caja	Telecinco	2009– 01-26		Reality Show
La chica de ayer	Antena 3	2009– 04-26	Ernesto Alterio	Drama Series
La gran oportunidad	Antena 3	2009– 06-21	Luis Larrodera	Quiz Show
La hora de José Mota.	TVE-1	2009– 01-09	José Mota	Comedy
La ira	Telecinco	2009– 09-08		TV-Movie
La Noche Mix	Antena 3	2009– 09-03		Documentary
La séptima silla.	Telecinco	2009– 02-27	Sandra Barneda	Talk Show
La tribu.	Telecinco	2009– 04-17	Javier Sardà	Talk Show
La vuelta al mundo en directo.	Antena 3	2009– 02-08	Óscar Martínez	Game Show
Ládrame mucho	Antena 3	2009– 03-27		Variety Show
Las mañanas de La 1.	TVE-1	2009– 08-24	Mariló Montero	Variety Show
Lola, la miniserie	Antena 3	2009– 09-15	Gala Évora	TV-Movie
Los exitosos Pells	Cuatro	2009– 09-07	Bea Segura	Sitcom
Los mejores años	TVE-1	2009– 03-03	por Carlos Sobera	Music
Los misterios de Laura	TVE-1	2009– 07-27	María Pujalte	Drama Series
Los últimos 20 metros en Antena 3.	Antena 3	2009– 07-22	Óscar Martínez	Quiz Show
Malas compañías	La Sexta	2009– 05-24	Manel Fuentes	Variety Show
Marisol	Antena 3	2009– 02-23	Teresa Hurtado de Ory	TV-Movie
Mi familia contra todos	Telecinco	2009– 10-07	Jesús Vázquez	Quiz Show
Mientras duermes.	Telecinco	2009– 09-01		Documentary
No estás sola, Sara	TVE-1	2009– 11–25	Amaia Salamanca	TV-Movie
Padres.	Antena 3	2009– 11-08	Lola Marceli	Sitcom
Pánico en el plató,	Antena 3	2009– 07-10	Juan y Medio	Talk Show
Paquirri	Telecinco	2009– 09-22	Antonio Velázquez	TV-Movie
Pelotas.	TVE-1	2009– 02-23	Ángel de Andrés López	Sitcom
Perdidos en la tribu	Cuatro	2009– 05-03	Nuria Roca	Reality Show
PokerStars: Estrellas en juego.	Antena 3	2009– 01-28		Sport
Reforma sorpresa	Cuatro	2009– 09-07	Nuria Roca	Reality Show
Rico al instante	Antena 3	2009– 01-10	Javier Estrada	Cooking Show
Sábado Deluxe,	Telecinco	2009– 08-07	Jorge Javier Vázquez	Talk Show
Sacalalengua	TVE-1	2009– 09-07	Ana Solanes	Science/Culture
Sálvame	Telecinco	2009– 03-19	Jorge Javier Vázquez	Gossip Show
Saturday Night Live	Cuatro	2009– 02-05	Eva Hache	Comedy
Somos cómplices	Antena 3	2009– 09-15	Cristina Peña	Soap Opera
Terrat Pack.	La Sexta	2009– 01-26	Andreu Buenafuente	Comedy
Toma cero... Y a jugar	Telecinco	2009– 08-17	Daniel Domenjó	Quiz Show
UCO: Unidad Central Operativa	TVE-1	2009– 05-28	Miguel Ángel Solá	Drama Series
Un burka por amor	Antena 3	2009– 11–24	Olivia Molina	TV-Movie
Un golpe de suerte.	Telecinco	2009– 06-28	Carmen Morales	Drama Series
Una bala para el rey.	Antena 3	2009– 03-15		TV-Movie
Vaya par... de tres	Antena 3	2009– 07-13	María Patiño	Gossip Show
Vaya tropa	Cuatro	2009– 12–20	Arturo Valls	Comedy
Verano de campeones.	Antena 3	2009– 07-17	Aitor Trigos	Quiz Show
Vidas marcadas	Antena 3	2009– 04-05		Reality Show
Vuélveme loca	Telecinco	2009– 12-12	Patricia Pérez	Gossip Show
¿Y ahora qué?.	TVE-1	2009– 04-17	Florentino Fernández	Comedy

== Television shows ==
- La 1
  - Telediario (1957– )
  - Informe Semanal (1973– )
  - Parlamento (1978–2014)
  - Corazón, Corazón (1993–2010)
  - Los Desayunos de TVE (1994–2020)
  - Cine de barrio (1995– )
  - Gente (1995–2011)
  - Corazón (1997– )
  - Cuéntame cómo pasó (2001– )
  - 59 segundos (2004–2012)
  - Destino Eurovisión (2004–2013)
  - España Directo (2005–2022)
  - Amar en tiempos revueltos (2005–2012)
  - Tengo una pregunta para usted (2007–2011)
  - Comando actualidad (2008– )
  - En noches como ésta (2008–2010)
  - La Lista (2008–2010)
- Antena 3
  - Antena 3 Noticias (1990– )
  - Club Megatrix (1995–2013)
  - Espejo público (1996– )
  - ¿Dónde estás, corazón? (2003–2011)
  - Los Hombres de Paco (2005–2010)
  - La ruleta de la fortuna (2006– )
  - Esta casa era una ruina (2007–2010)
  - El Internado (2007–2010)
  - Locos por la tele (2007–2010)
  - Tal cual lo contamos (2008–2010)
  - Ven a cenar conmigo (2008–2010)
  - El Diario (2008–2011)
  - Física o Química (2008–2011)
- La 2
  - Al filo de lo imposble (1982– )
  - Pueblo de Dios (1982– )
  - Últimas preguntas (1983– )
  - En portada (1984– )
  - Metrópolis (1985– )
  - Documentos TV (1986– )
  - Tendido cero (1986– )
  - Días de cine (1991– )
  - La Aventura del saber (1992– )
  - Jara y sedal (1992– )
  - Zona ACB (1993–2010)
  - La 2 noticias (1994–2020)
  - La noche temática, (1995– )
  - Redes (1996–2013)
  - Agrosfera (1997– )
  - El escarabajo verde (1997– )
  - Saber y ganar (1997– )
  - El Cine de La 2 (1998– )
  - Versión española (1998– )
  - Aquí hay trabajo (2000– )
  - España en comunidad (2000–2020)
  - Shalom (2003– )
  - Los Lunnis (2003–2010)
  - Padres en apuros (2003–2010)
  - Pocoyo (2005– )
  - Palabra por palabra (2005–2011)
  - Cámara abierta 2.0 (2007– )
  - Página 2 (2007– )
  - Muchachada Nui (2007–2010)
  - Tres14 (2007–2014)
  - En lengua de signos (2008– )
  - Zoom tendencias ( 2008– )
  - Fábrica de ideas (2008–2017)
- Cuatro
  - Cuarto milenio (2005– )
  - Callejeros (2005–2014)
  - Noticias Cuatro (2005–2019)
  - El Hormiguero (2006–2011)
  - Supernanny (2006–2017)
  - Las mañanas de Cuatro (2006–2018)
  - Desafío extremo (2007–2014)
  - Ola Ola (2008–2010)
  - Password (2008–2010)
  - Fama, ¡a bailar! (2008–2011)
  - Pekín Express (2008–2011)
- Telecinco
  - Informativos Telecinco (1990– )
  - Bricomanía (1997–2010)
  - Nosolomúsica (1999–2012)
  - Survivor Spain (2000– )
  - Hospital Central (2000–2012)
  - Big Brother Spain (2000–2017)
  - Bricomanía (2005–2010)
  - Decogarden (2005–2010)
  - Operación Triunfo (2005–2011)
  - Karlos Arguiñano en tu cocina (2004–2010)
  - Diario de (2004–2011)
  - Gran Hermano VIP (2004–2019)
  - El Programa de Ana Rosa (2005– )
  - Aída (2005–2014)
  - Pasapalabra (2007–2019)
  - Survivor Spain (2006– )
  - La que se avecina (2007– )
  - Escenas de Matrimonio (2007–2010)
  - Hormigas blancas (2007–2011)
  - La Noria (2007–2012)
  - Pasapalabra (2007–2019)
  - El Juego de tu vida (2008–2010)
  - Tú sí que vales (2008–2013)
  - I love TV (2008–2015)
  - Mujeres y Hombres y Viceversa (2008–2018)
- La Sexta
  - El Intermedio (2006– )
  - La Sexta Noticias (2006– )
  - Sé lo que hicisteis...(2006–2011)
  - Buenafuente (2007–2011)
  - Minuto y resultado (2007–2012)
  - Salvados (2008– )
  - Que vida más triste (2008–2010)
  - La Tira Comedia (2008–2010)

== Ending this year ==
- La 1
  - Cartelera (1994–2009)
  - Saber vivir (1997–2009)
  - El Conciertazo (2000–2009)
  - ¡Mira quién baila! (2005–2009)
  - Herederos (2007–2009)
  - Esta mañana (2008–2009)
  - Guante blanco (2008–2009)
- La 2
  - La Mandrágora (1997–2009)
  - Leonart (2006–2009)
  - Con todos los acentos (2005–2009)
  - No disparen al pianista (2007–2009)
  - Plutón B.R.B. Nero (2008–2009)
- Antena 3
  - Art Attack (2005–2009)
  - La Familia Mata (2007–2009)
  - 18, la serie (2008–2009)
  - Lalola (2008–2009)
- Cuatro
  - Corta-t (2005–2009)
  - Ajuste de cuentas (2008–2009)
  - Éstas no son las noticias (2008–2009)
- Telecinco
  - La Mirada crítica (1998–2009)
  - El comisario (1999–2009)
  - Camera Café (2005–2009)
  - El buscador de historias (2006–2009)
  - Yo soy Bea (2006–2009)
  - Está pasando (2007–2009)
  - Hermanos y Detectives (2007–2009)
  - ¡Guaypaut! (2008–2009)
  - Mi gemela es hija única (2008–2009)
  - Rojo y negro (2008–2009)
  - Sin tetas no hay paraíso (2008–2009)
- La Sexta
  - Hoy cocinas tú (2006–2009)
  - Todos ahhh 100 (2006–2009)
  - Estados Alterados Maitena (2008–2009)
  - Salud a la carta (2008–2009)

== Changes of network affiliation ==
Show	Moved From	Moved To
Estudio Estadio (1973– )	La 2	Teledeporte

== Deaths ==
- 30 January – Fernando Cebrián, 79, actor.
- 1 March – Pepe Rubianes, 61, actor & comedian.
- 18 April – Fernando Hilbeck, 75, actor.
- 3 May – Pablo Lizcano, 58, host.
- 24 May – Pedro Sempson, 89, actor.
- 15 June – Fernando Delgado, 79, actor.
- 26 June – Conchita Núñez, 66, voice actress.
- 31 July – Mary Carrillo, 89, actress.
- 4 August – Julián Lago, 62, journalist & host.
- 6 August – Lola Lemos, 96, actress.
- 11 August – Valerio Lazarov, 73, director & producer.
- 6 September – Julio de Benito, 62, journalist.
- 16 October – Andrés Montes, 53, journalist
- 2 November – José Luis López Vázquez, 87, actor.
- 6 December -Pedro Altares, 74, journalist.
- 11 December – Francisco Piquer, 87, actor.

== See also ==
- 2009 in Spain
- List of Spanish films of 2009
