= César Carballo =

Spanish physician and TV guest

- Born: César Carballo Cardona; 1968 (age 57–58); Madrid, Spain
- Education: University of Alcalá
- Occupations: Physician; medical expert
- Years active: 2020-present (media)

César Carballo Cardona (1968) is a Spanish physician and emergency medicine doctor. He is an emergency service physician at the Hospital Universitario Ramón y Cajal and vice president of the Sociedad Española de Medicina de Urgencias y Emergencias (SEMES) of Madrid. He is a prolific television guest since the beginning of the COVID-19 pandemic in Spain, having been called by the Huffington Post one of the most recognizable medical experts of the Spanish crisis.

== Education and early work ==
Carballo graduated from the University of Alcalá, after which he specialized in family medicine and emergency medicine in the Hospital Universitario Doce de Octubre, amassing a series of master's degrees in those and other fields. Afterwards he worked in several of the main hospitals in the community of Madrid, among them La Paz, Infanta Sofia and Ramón y Cajal, the last one with special notability. In 2014, he became vice president of SEMES Madrid. In 2019 his tenure became controversial upon being demoted from his job in La Paz without having fulfilled his obligatory time, which SEMES denounced as a product of further irregularities on the center. Before his removal, Carballo had asked for more human resources to cover summer months.

== Career ==
In January 2020, Carballo started appearing in national television as part of the board of experts gathered in investigation program Cuarto Milenio, where he analyzed the beginning of the COVID-19 pandemic. The program, whose medical guests voiced predictions about the pandemic's evolution in Spain that turned out accurate, was put on hiatus on March due to the crisis, after which Carballo joined Milenio Live and La Estirpe de los Libres, YouTube programs used by Jiménez to replace his television activities. Carballo participated in Cuarto Milenio's return episode in September, and later became part of a weekly monograph on the pandemic, Horizonte, also directed by Jiménez and broadcast in Telecinco (later in Cuatro). and also directed by Jiménez. During this time, he became also part of the usual cast of several unrelated shows on national TV, among them La Sexta Noche in La Sexta and Espejo Público en Antena 3.

Carballo became known for a stance highly critical of the pandemic's management by the Spanish government, to the point of asking for the resignation of the chairman of the Coordination Centre for Health Alerts and Emergencies, Fernando Simón, in one of his first appearances on La Sexta Noche in November.

The same month, he introduced in Horizonte a lip protector model, FreeLips, designed by himself to avoid the virus' transmission through the surfaces of cups. Audience in social media was divided, attracting both interest on the device and criticism against its commerciality, though demand of the product was so high that its website crashed in a short time.

On January 13, 2021, Carballo became one of the first sanitary workers to receive the COVID-19 vaccine developed by Pfizer, including in his Twitter account a video of it and encouraging citizens to follow his example, though not without criticizing again the governmental management of the vaccination protocols. Only two days later, Carballo was involved in a in Twitter conflict with Lluís Serra from the government of Canarias' scientific committee, who accused Carballo of speaking without knowledge about public welfare, which was followed by Carballo sending him his own professional resume on said field. Over time, other physicians criticized Carballo for the frequency of his appearances in TV.

== Books ==
- Adelante: Solo existe el futuro. Y es nuestro. (Aguilar, 2020) - with José María Gay de Liébana, Yayo Herrero, Mamen Mendizábal and Ainara Zubillaga
- Desde la trinchera (Aguilar, 2021)

== Media career ==
=== Television ===
- Cuarto Milenio (2020-presente), en Cuatro.
- Horizonte (2020–present), Telecinco and later Cuatro.
- La Sexta Noche (2020–present), La Sexta.
- El programa de AR (2020–present), Telecinco.
- Espejo Público (2020–present), Antena 3.
- Al rojo vivo (2021–present), in La Sexta.
- Liarla Pardo (2021–present), in La Sexta.
- 120 minutos (2021–present), in Telemadrid.
- Está pasando (2021–present), in Telemadrid.
- Más Vale Tarde (2021–present), in La Sexta.
- La Roca (2021–present), in La Sexta.

=== Internet ===
- Milenio Live (2020–present), YouTube and Mtmad.
- La Reunión Secreta (2020–present), YouTube.
- La Estirpe de los Libres (2020), YouTube.
