= José Miguel Gaona =

Spanish psychiatrist

- Born: José Miguel Gaona Cartolano; 1957 (age 68–69); Brussels, Belgium
- Education: University of Córdoba; Complutense University of Madrid; University of Navarra
- Occupations: Physician; Psychiatrist; Podcaster; TV host; Writer
- Years active: 2001–present
- Spouse: Lourdes Martínez Jiménez

José Miguel Gaona Cartolano (born 1957 in Brussels, Belgium) is a Spanish physician, psychiatrist and writer, specialized in forensic psychiatry, neurology and developmental psychology. He is one of the most recognized mind specialists in Spain, with a long career in TV and radio, as well as a member of the European Psychiatric Association and the New York Academy of Sciences. He founded the magazine Educar bien in 2006 and the podcast La Reunión Secreta in 2020.

== Career ==
Gaona was born in Brussels to Spanish parents, who abandoned Spain during the Francoist era with the help of the Maquis due to his grandfather's role as a captain of the Second Spanish Republic. They lived many years in Chile, where his family got involved with poet Pablo Neruda, journalist Augusto Olivares and successive heads of state Salvador Allende and Augusto Pinochet. Gaona owned an official passport of statelessness until 12 years old, when his family could return to Spain.

After returning to Spain, Gaona obtained a medical degree with Latin honors in the University of Córdoba, undergoing his thesis under famous neurologist and psychiatrist Carlos Castilla del Pino. Afterwards he added a doctorate in medicine and a master's degree in medical psychology in the Complutense University of Madrid, and later studied theology in the University of Navarra, attracted by the field of neurotheology. During his medical tenure he worked as a heart surgeon in the University of Göttingen in Germany, as a mind health specialist for Médecins du Monde during the Bosnian War and the Rwandan genocide, and as a teacher in several universities in Spain and United States.

Gaona introduced the first AIDS tests in Spain in 1985 with the help of Nobel Prize Luc Montagnier, also opening the first treatment center in the country, which was later closed down by the National Police Corps due to the social stigma regarding the illness.

He started his work in media during the 2000s, becoming a usual collaborator to Iker Jiménez, as in his programs Milenio 3 in Cadena SER and Cuarto Milenio in Cuatro, and to Ana Rosa Quintana. In 2006, following the publishing of his book Ser adolescente no es fácil, he founded the magazine Educar bien in partnership with child and youth specialists like Amando de Miguel, Javier Urra and Pedro Núñez Morgades.

He performed especially relevant research in fields traditionally associated to parapsychology, most notably near-death experiences, which composed the topic of his 2012 book Al otro lado del túnel, prologued by the renowned Raymond Moody, and the psychiatric facet of demonic possession, for which he joined official courses by the Catholic Church in Vatican City. His work in the NDE led him to work with cognitive psychologist Michael Persinger, popularizer of the God helmet, and Bruce Greyson.

Due to his experience, he participated in the judicial processes of several famous criminal cases in Spain, among them the José Bretón case and that of Patrick Nogueira. He also was part of the mind health team of the disaster workers during the 2021 Cumbre Vieja volcanic eruption.

In February 2020, Gaona was part of the guests experts of the famous Cuarto Milenio episodes that predicted the impact of the COVID-19 pandemic in Spain. The same month, due to the program's hiatus as a consequence of the pandemic, Gaona opened his own podcast, La Reunión Secreta. During the rest of the year, Gaona would harsh criticism to the Spanish government's management of the crisis, in especially the chairman of the Coordination Centre for Health Alerts and Emergencies, Fernando Simón, whose actions Gaona called "despicable".

In 2022, he published his first novel, Furor Domini.

== Awards ==
- Young Researcher Award of the Community of Madrid
- Silver Cross of the Orden de los Caballeros Custodios de Calatrava la Vieja (2021)

== Activity ==
=== TV ===
- Día a día (2004) – Telecinco
- Desde Dentro (2004) – Telemadrid
- Cuarto Milenio (2005–present) – Cuatro
- El programa de Ana Rosa (2005–present) – Telecinco
- Enfoque (2005) – La 2
- 360 grados (2007) – EITB
- Para todos La 2 (2012) – La 2
- El gran debate (2009–2011) – Telecinco
- Espacio en blanco (2010–2012) – La 2
- Abre los ojos y mira (2013) – Telecinco
- Al otro lado (2013) – Telecinco
- La observadora (2015) – La 2
- Caso Cerrado (2019) – Telemundo
- Horizonte (2020-presente) – Cuatro

=== Radio ===
- Milenio 3 – (2005) – Cadena SER
- Herrera en la Onda (2012–2015) – Onda Cero
- La rosa de los vientos (2012) – Onda Cero
- Fin de Semana (2020–present) – COPE

=== Internet ===
- La Reunión Secreta (2020–present) – Ivoox and YouTube
- La Estirpe de los Libres (2020–present)

== Bibliography ==
- El síndrome de Eva (La Esfera de los Libros, 2001)
- Ser adolescente no es fácil (La Esfera de los Libros, 2006)
- Endorfinas: las hormonas de la felicidad (La Esfera de los Libros, 2007)
- Al otro lado del túnel: (La Esfera de los Libros, 2012)
- El límite (La Esfera de los Libres, 2015)
- Furor Domini (La Esfera de los Libros, 2021)
