= Un Tío Blanco Hetero =

Spanish YouTuber, critic of feminism

Un Tío Blanco Hetero (UTBH)
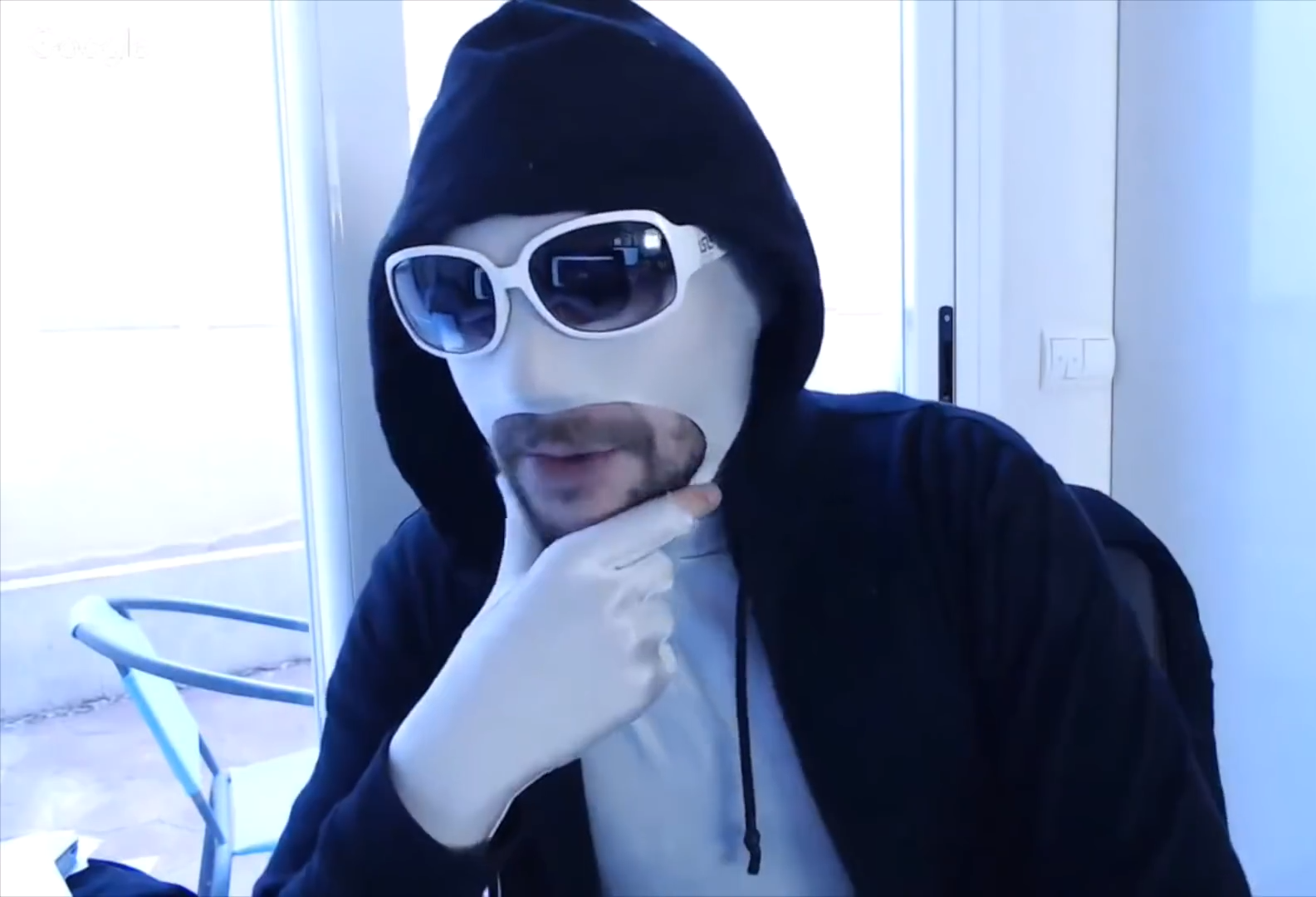
- Born: Sergio Candanedo; 1988 (age 37–38); Madrid, Spain
- Occupation: Video producer

YouTube information
- Channel: Un Tío Blanco Hetero
- Years active: 2018–present
- Genre: Social criticism
- Subscribers: 560 thousand
- Views: 95.3 million
- Last updated: 24 May 2026

Sergio Alberto Candanedo Pomeda (1988, Madrid), also known as Un Tío Blanco Hetero ("A White Straight Guy"), is a Spanish YouTuber. Active since 2018, he criticizes sociocultural concepts like feminism, gender studies and political correctness.

== Biography ==
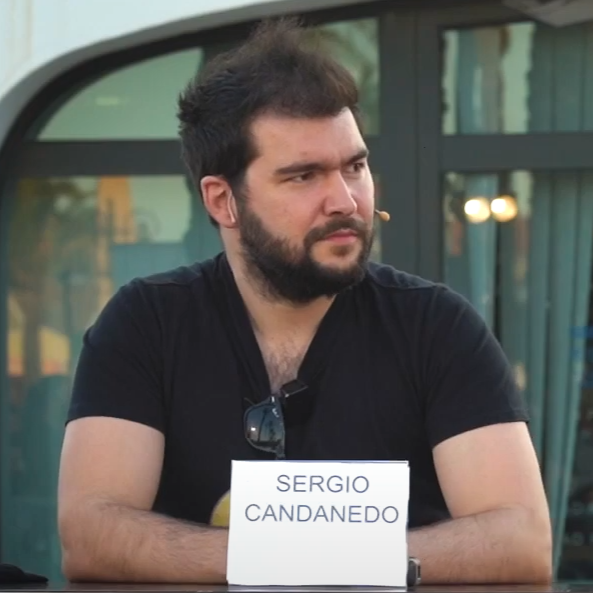
Sergio Candanedo in 2021.

Candanedo started his YouTube career in early 2018. Before that, he had worked as a bald consultant before moving to Canada, where he studied for two years before returning to Spain. It was there where he got the idea to open a YouTube channel, in the style of social critics like H3h3Productions, Jordan Peterson and Some Black Guy, who inspired his own nickname. In 2016, he also wrote and co-directed the short film En Tu Puta Cara for online film contest Notodofilmfest.

His first video, which addressed the consequences of the Me Too movement, was uploaded to YouTube on 2 February 2018. He introduced then his characteristic visual style, in which he monologues to the camera while wearing a white lycra mask (nicknamed by himself his "human condom" and based on Batman's attire), a black hoodie and plastic sunglasses. As he explained later, he chose this appearance not only to hide his identity and stand out, but also to divest himself of his individuality and to represent ironically the "white heterosexual" collective in the gender perspective's own terms. The mentioned video attracted a great deal of views and subscribers, which only increased with his next productions, reaching 140 000 in only seven months and allowing him to open a Patreon account.

His early videos also established his channel's theme, which orbits around building criticism of modern feminism through research material, as well as verbalizing "that which many think but don't dare to say." Candanedo attributed his success to his addressing of those topics, which didn't impede him from attracting controversy from related circles, to the point of receiving death threats with some frequency. Despite the many political affiliations media has speculated about him, he declared himself as a YouTuber for both left and right-wing politics. His channel's impact also improved the presence of other Spanish video producers with the same thematic, among them the YouTuber and PhD in science Xeno Shenlong.

In May 2019, UTBH became mediatic after his participation in the Free Market Road Show in Castellón was subjected to an escrache. The incident's authorship fell on feminist association Subversives, which had previously called to boycott the act on the saying it was "fascist and misogynist," and whose members had to be driven outside by the National Police Corps. Some days later, the YouTuber uploaded a video about the incident to deflect the accusations.

The same month, Candanedo released his first book, Prohibir la manzana y encontrar la serpiente, written along with fellow YouTuber Leyre Khyal.

In September 2020, Candanedo started working as a weekly columnist in online newspaper Vozpópuli. Candanedo started appearing on Iker Jiménez's program Horizonte in February 2021 as part of a debate about the protests against the imprisonment of Pablo Hasél.

In June 2023, a Spanish court dismissed his defamation suit against a feminist activist and ordered him to pay court costs.

== Bibliography ==
- With Leyre Khyal, Prohibir la manzana y encontrar la serpiente, Deusto (2019)
