= Pablo Fuente =

Spanish science communicator

- Born: Pablo Fuente Aguirre; 1973 (age 52–53); Madrid, Spain
- Education: Complutense University of Madrid; ESADE
- Occupations: Television host; podcaster; business consultant
- Years active: 2015–present

Pablo Fuente Aguirre (born 1973) is a Spanish economist, podcaster and science communicator. He is mainly known for his work as a usual collaborator to journalist Iker Jiménez in Mediaset España, in which El Mundo and other newspapers distinguished him for his informative work during the COVID-19 pandemic in Spain. He is the creator of the investigation podcast El Respeto, awarded as Podcast of the Year 2020 in Spain.

== Career ==
Born in a family of Galician origins and the youngest of five siblings, Pablo Fuente graduated in Economic Sciences from the Complutense University of Madrid. He later earned a master's degree in Business Management from ESADE. Fuente began his career as a business consultant, working with major companies such as PepsiCo and Energizer. He later transitioned to the Private Equity industry, serving as a growth-oriented operating partner. He supported companies across 13 European countries in this role, driving growth and operational improvements.

Despite his successful corporate career, Fuente’s true passions were journalism and radio. Inspired by renowned hosts like Miguel Blanco Medrano and Iker Jiménez, he ventured into investigative journalism. In 2015, while living between Belgium and Switzerland, Fuente launched his podcast, El Respeto, on the iVoox platform. The program focused on in-depth investigative reporting and quickly garnered a dedicated audience.

In March 2020, Fuente’s role in Cuarto Milenio brought him widespread recognition during the COVID-19 pandemic. His segment, which included data on the lack of governmental preparedness and advice for viewers to brace for a crisis, went viral on Spanish social media. The episode gained additional attention after being retweeted by Inés García, a rival channel La Sexta presenter. However, the newfound visibility also brought challenges. Fuente, who had joined the specialized program Horizonte: Informe Covid, began receiving death threats due to his coverage of the pandemic. These threats led Fuente to consider leaving his work, but he was ultimately persuaded to stay by Jiménez, who implemented strict security measures. The case was resolved following an investigation by Spain’s National Police Corps, resulting in several arrests.

== Recent Developments ==
Pablo Fuente currently resides in the United States, supporting American companies’ growth while expanding his media projects. His latest initiative, Órbita Infinita, is a new segment separate from El Respeto that focuses on space exploration. Fuente regularly covers rocket launches from the Kennedy Space Center in Florida and SpaceX facilities in Texas, utilizing his media credentials to gain exclusive access to NASA events.

Through Órbita Infinita, Fuente has interviewed prominent figures in the space industry, including Jared Isaacman, a two-time astronaut and nominee for NASA Administrator. The program has become a respected platform for space journalism, combining Fuente’s investigative skills with his passion for exploring the final frontier.

== Awards ==
At the end of 2020, Fuente received the award to the Best Podcast of the Year by the Asociación de Escuchas de Podcasting, attracting 46% of the crowd's voting.

== Professional activity ==
=== Television ===
- La mesa del coronel (2019), Cuatro.
- Cuarto Milenio (2019–2022), Cuatro.
- Horizonte (2020–2022), Telecinco and later Cuatro.
- Futura (2022–present), Cuatro.

=== Internet ===
- Órbita Infinita (2023-present), YouTube.
- El Respeto (2015–present), iVoox.
- Milenio Live (2019–2021), YouTube and Mtmad.
- La Estirpe de los Libres (2020–2022), YouTube.
