= Spy Time =

- Theatrical release poster
- Spanish: Anacleto: agente secreto
- Directed by: Javier Ruiz Caldera
- Written by: Pablo Alén; Breixo Corral; Fernando Navarro
- Produced by: Francisco Ramos, Eneko Gutiérrez
- Starring: Imanol Arias; Quim Gutiérrez
- Cinematography: Gemma Fauria
- Music by: Marc Blanes Matas; Pablo Uroz
- Distributed by: Warner Bros. Pictures
- Release date: 4 September 2015 (Spain)
- Running time: 87 minutes
- Country: Spain
- Language: Spanish
- Budget: $2.2 million
- Box office: $3 million

Spy Time (Spanish: Anacleto: agente secreto; lit. 'Anacleto: Secret Agent') is a 2015 Spanish Eurospy action comedy film directed by Javier Ruiz Caldera based on the characters from the comic book series of the same name created by Manuel Vázquez Gallego. It stars Imanol Arias as the title character.

== Plot ==
Former secret agent Anacleto (Imanol Arias) comes out of retirement when his arch-enemy Vázquez (Carlos Areces) escapes from prison and promptly targets Anacleto's son Adolfo (Quim Gutiérrez), who accidentally discovers his father's double identity and finds himself forced to co-operate with him to survive Vázquez's quest for revenge while trying to win back the heart of his ex-girlfriend Katia (Alexandra Jiménez).

== Cast ==
- Imanol Arias as Anacleto
- Quim Gutiérrez as Adolfo
- Carlos Areces as Vázquez
- Alexandra Jiménez as Katia
- Rossy de Palma as Katia's mother
- Emilio Gutiérrez Caba as Anacleto's boss
- Berto Romero as Martín
- Eduardo Gómez as Mac "El Molécula"
- Dani el Rojo as Joe the Butcher

== Awards and nominations ==
Awards	Category	Nominated	Result
III Premios Feroz	Best Comedy		Nominated
III Premios Feroz	Best Supporting Actor	Quim Gutiérrez	Nominated
III Premios Feroz	Best Original Soundtrack	Javier Rodero	Nominated
III Premios Feroz	Best Trailer		Nominated
30th Goya Awards	Best Sound	Marc Orts, Oriol Tarragó and Sergio Bürmann	Nominated
30th Goya Awards	Best Special Effects	Lluís Castells and Lluís Rivera	Won

== See also ==
- List of Spanish films of 2015
