= Vicente Garrido Genovés =

Spanish criminologist, psychologist and novelist

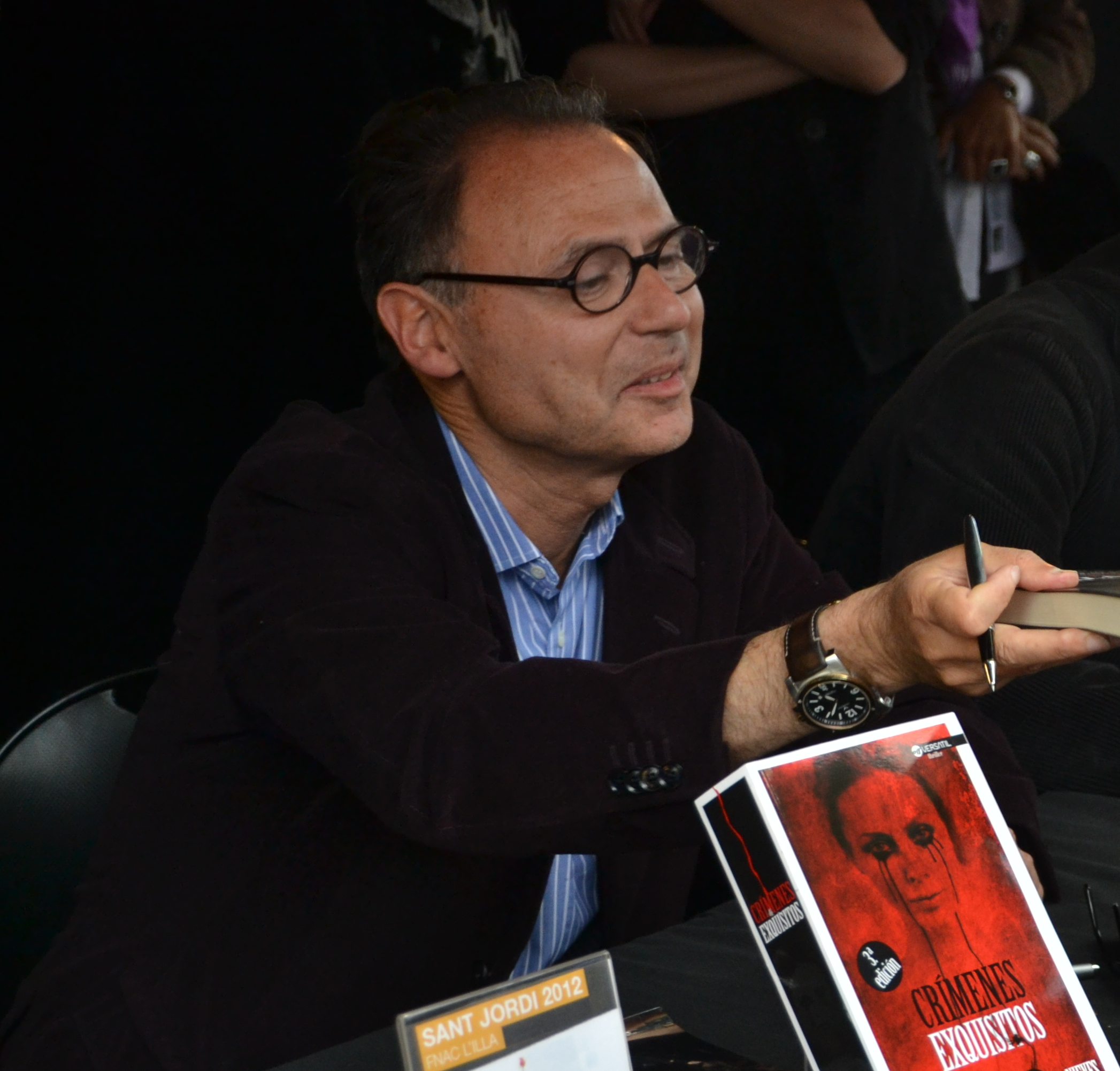
- Garrido
- Born: Vicente Garrido Genovés; 1958; Valencia, Spain
- Education: Complutense University of Madrid; University of Valencia; Ottawa University
- Occupations: Criminologist; Psychologist; TV host; Writer
- Years active: 1997–present

Vicente Garrido Genovés (Valencia, Spain, 1958) is a Spanish criminologist, psychologist and writer. His main fields of specialization are criminal psychology, criminal profiling and juvenile delinquency. He is also a prolific TV guest, known by his appearances in shows like Informe Semanal in RTVE, Espejo Público in Antena 3 and Cuarto milenio in Cuatro, as well as in press and radio. Garrido is also a crime fiction writer in partnership with Nieves Abarca.

== Career ==
Garrido graduated in criminology by the Complutense University of Madrid in 1980 and later doctored in psychology in the University of Valencia, of which he would become a professor and researcher in the fields of evolutive criminology, criminal investigation, offender profiling and prevention of juvenile delinquency. He added a postgraduate in the Ottawa University in Canada in 1986, and in 1991 he worked as a teacher at University of Salford in United Kingdom, as well as professor of criminal law in the Spanish National University of Distance Education.

He is part of the board of the specialized magazines Psychology, Crime & Law and Journal of Correctional Education.

Between 1997 and 1999 worked as a consultant for the United Nations for prevention of juvenile delinquency in Hispanic America. He was also a consultant for the General Secretary of Penitentiary Institutions in Spain, and was part of the commission in charge of the Ley Reguladora de Responsabilidad Jurídica del Menor, approved in 2000.

He is also a crime fiction writer, working in partnership with fellow criminal expert Nieves Abarca. They debuted in 2012 with the novel Crímenes exquisitos, the beginning of an ongoing series of five installments.

== Bibliography ==
=== Non-fiction ===
- Técnicas de Tratamiento para Delincuentes. Editorial Universitaria Ramón Areces. 1993. ISBN 978-84-800407-3-0.
- Educación Social para Delincuentes. Tirant Lo Blanch. 1997. ISBN 978-84-800256-3-8. - with Ana María Gómez Piñana
- Diccionario de Criminología. Tirant Lo Blanch. 1998. ISBN 978-84-800266-2-8. - with Ana María Gómez Piñana
- Principios de Criminología. Tirant Lo Blanch. 1998. ISBN 978-84-844240-1-7. - with Per Stangeland and Santiago Redondo Illescas
- El psicópata: Un camaleón en la sociedad actual. Algar. 2003. ISBN 978-84-957222-9-4.
- Cara a cara con el psicópata. Ariel. 2004. ISBN 978-84-344446-1-4.
- Amores que matan: acoso y violencia contra las mujeres. Algar. 2007. ISBN 978-84-931382-7-1.
- ¿Qué es la Psicología Criminológica?. Biblioteca Nueva. 2005. ISBN 978-84-974231-2-0.
- Manual de Intervención Educativa en Readaptación Social: Fundamentos de la Intervención. Vol. I. Tirant lo Blanch. 2005. ISBN 978-84-8456-465-2.
- Manual de Intervención Educativa en Readaptación Social: Los programas del pensamiento prosocial. Vol. II. Tirant lo Blanch. 2005. ISBN 978-84-8456-501-7. - with María Jesús López Latorre and José Luis Alba Robles
- Antes que sea tarde: Como prevenir la tiranía de los hijos. Nabla Ediciones. 2007. ISBN 978-84-935926-0-8.
- Reincidencia Delictiva en Menores Infractores de la Comunidad de Madrid: Evaluación, Características Delictivas y Modelos de Predicción. Organismo autónomo Agencia de la Comunidad de Madrid para la Reeducación y Reinserción del Menor Infractor. 2007.
- La investigación criminal: La psicología aplicada al descubrimiento, captura y condena de los criminales. Nabla Ediciones. 2008. ISBN 978-84-935926-8-4.
- Mientras vivas en casa: Habilidades y Práctica de la Inteligencia Educacional. Sello Editorial. 2009. ISBN 978-84-937580-6-6.
- Amores que matan: Acoso y violencia contra la mujeres. Sello Editorial. 2015. ISBN 978-84-943113-3-8.

=== Fiction ===
- Crímenes exquisitos. Ediciones B. 2012. ISBN 978-84-92929-52-8. - with Nieves Abarca
- Martyrium. Ediciones B. 2013. ISBN 978-84-92929-88-7. - with Nieves Abarca
- El hombre de la máscara de espejos. Ediciones B. 2015. ISBN 978-84-9070-136-2. - with Nieves Abarca
- Los muertos viajan deprisa. Ediciones B. 2016. ISBN 978-84-666578-1-5. - with Nieves Abarca
- El beso de Tosca. Ediciones B. 2018. ISBN 978-84-666-6301-4. - with Nieves Abarca

== Awards ==
- Cross of the Order of Saint Raymond of Peñafort (1999)
- Rafael Salillas Award (2014) by Spanish Society of Criminological Investigation
