= François Balloux =

Professor of Computational Biology at UCL

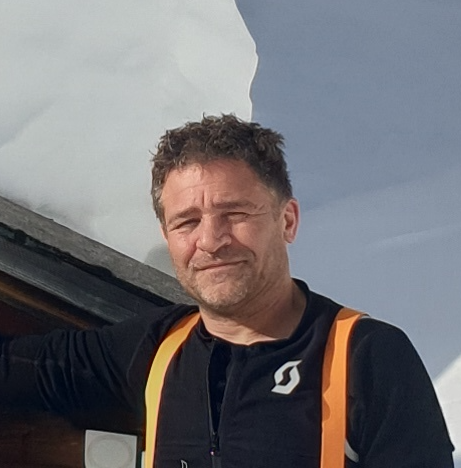
- Education: University of Lausanne
- Scientific career
- Fields: Computational systems biology; Infectious disease epidemiology; Genetics
- Workplaces: University College London; Imperial College London; University of Cambridge
- Thesis: Gene Flow in Natural Populations: From Panmixia to Speciation (2000)
- Website: www.ucl.ac.uk/biosciences/people/francois-balloux

François Balloux is the director of the UCL Genetics Institute, and a professor of computational biology at University College London.

== Early life and education ==
Balloux earned a master's degree in 1996 and a doctorate in 2000 from the University of Lausanne. He then completed postdoctoral research at the University of Edinburgh.

== Career ==
Balloux was an assistant professor at the University of Cambridge, between 2002 and 2007, before taking a position as an associate professor in infectious disease epidemiology at Imperial College London. In 2012, Balloux became a full professor at University College London.

=== Research ===
Balloux's research lies at the interface of genomics, epidemiology, evolution and ecology. The main focus of his work is on the reconstruction of disease outbreaks and epidemics of human and wildlife pathogens, and the emergence of antimicrobial resistance. He has also engaged in research on the emergence and spread of drug resistance in tuberculosis, and Gram-negative bacteria, and the distribution of zoonotic pathogens in vertebrates.

Balloux participated in curating a dataset of SARS-CoV-2 genetic samples early on in the pandemic.
