= José María Gay de Liébana =

Spanish economist and professor (1953–2021)

José Maria Gay de Liébana
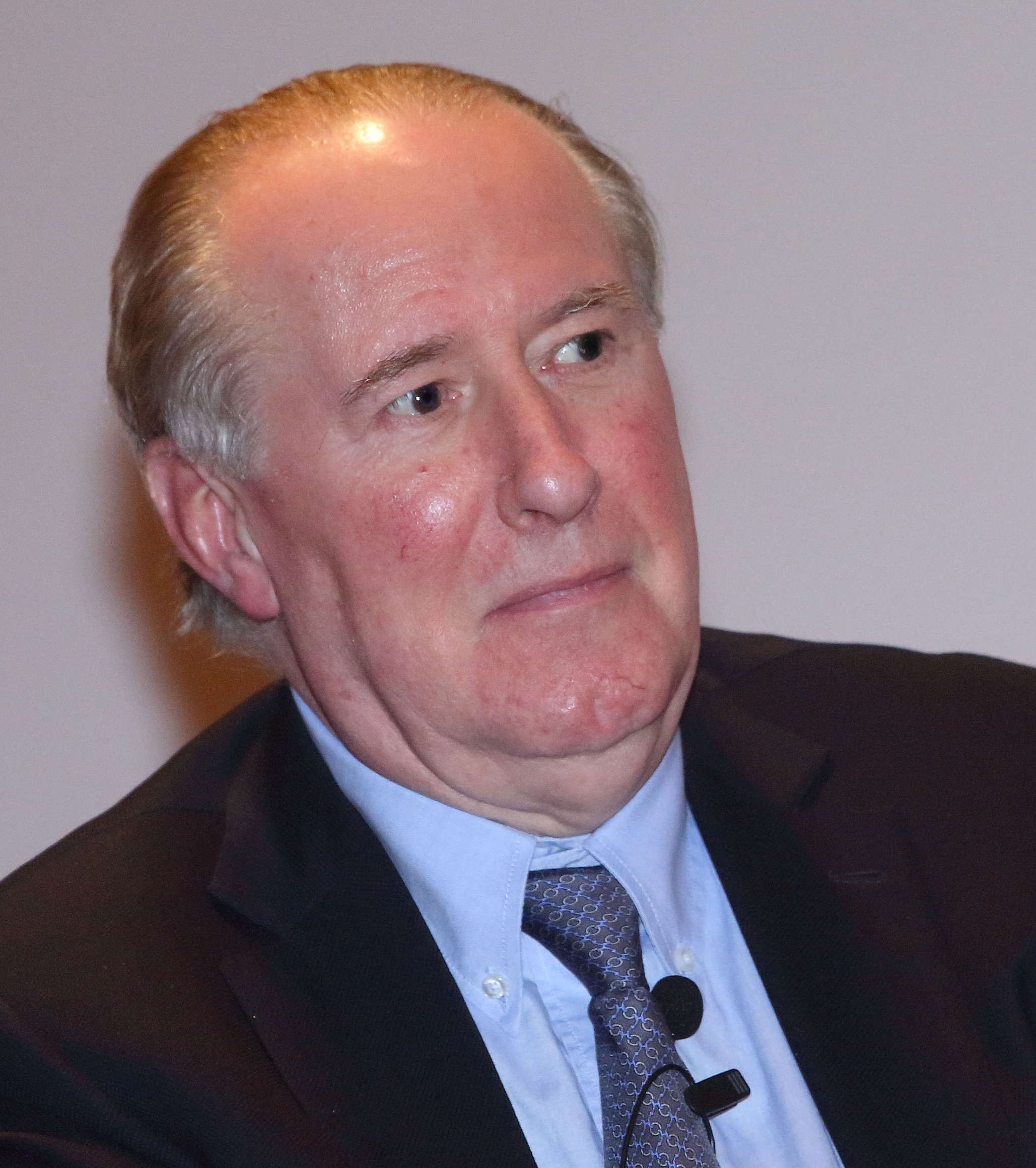
- Gay de Liébana in 2018
- Born: 6 May 1953; Barcelona, Spain
- Died: 16 July 2021 (aged 68); Barcelona, Spain

Academic career
- Institution: University of Barcelona (since 1981)
- School or tradition: Supply-side economics

José María Gay de Liébana y Saludas (Catalan: Josep Maria Gay de Liébana i Saludas; 6 May 1953 – 16 July 2021) was a Spanish economist, lawyer, and university professor, popular as an economic commentator on several television programs.

== Biography and career ==
Gay de Liébana was born in Barcelona on 6 May 1953. He earned a doctorate in economics and social sciences from the Abat Oliba CEU University, and a degree in law from the Universidad Camilo José Cela in Madrid.

In 1979 Gay de Liébana founded the firm "J.M. Gay & Cia" specialized in tax, business, and legal advice and consultancy. From 1981 he was professor of financial economics and accounting at the University of Barcelona. Between 2004 and 2006 he was member of the RCD Espanyol Board of Directors.

Gay de Liébana rose to fame during the Great Recession, during which he earned in 2012 the nickname of the "outraged economist" for his denunciation and fierce criticism of the responses to the crisis, defending the liberal postulates characteristic of supply-side economics. Previously, in 2011, he participated in an episode of the program Salvados, with Jordi Évole, in which he spoke about the finances of professional soccer clubs.

Gay de Liébana was a regular contributor to the program La Sexta Noche, broadcast on the channel La Sexta, in which he gave practical lessons in economics. Among them was the memorable appearance in 2012, where he explained what the rumored bailout of Spain could mean.

On 20 March 2014, Gay de Liébana became a full academic of the Real Academia Europea de Doctores, until his death in 2021.

Since 2016 Gay de Liébana had been collaborating in the radio program, Herrera en COPE, on the COPE radio channel. He also collaborated, albeit on a more ad hoc basis, on programs on channels such as TV3, 8TV, Catalunya Ràdio, RAC 1.

Gay de Liébana also worked as an expert, being so in the corruption scandal called Caso Palau-Millet in 2017. In the judgment of the case in 2018, the court criticized Gay de Liébana's expertise, indicating that he affirmed some accusations without sufficient evidence and that he would have made some "manifestly improvable" calculation.

== Personal life and death ==
Gay de Liébana married María Mercedes, with whom he had his only son, Pepe.

Gay de Liébana rarely gave his opinion on politics, but he identified himself as a non-independent Catalan who considered it a "heroic" act, and was a strong critic of the political class, whom he considered thieves and that it was necessary to "clean and sanitize" them. He was also a big fan of football team RCD Espanyol.

Gay de Liébana announced in 2018 he was suffering from kidney cancer which had metastasised in the body. He died on 16 July 2021 in his hometown at the age of 68. His last media appearance was on the day of his death, in a video recorded days before for La Vanguardia, explaining the capital flight in Spain. On the same day, an opinion article of his was also published in El Economista entitled ¿Qué fue del 20/20?.

== Works ==
- España se escribe con E de endeudamiento. Grupo Planeta. 2012.
- ¿Dónde estamos?: verdades, mentiras y deberes pendientes de la recuperación económica. Grupo Planeta. 2015.
- La gran burbuja del fútbol: Los modelos de negocio que oculta el deporte más importante del mundo. Penguin Random House Grupo Editorial España. 2016.
- Revolución tecnológica y nueva economía. Deusto. 2020.
- Adelante, solo existe el futuro y es nuestro. Aguilar. 2020.

== Filmography ==
- Torrente 5: Operación Eurovegas as himself.

== Awards ==
- "Premio Economía" 2012 by the Spanish Association of Foreign Press Correspondents. (2013)
- European Medal of Merit for Merit at Work by the European Economic and Competitiveness Association. (2014)
- Honorary member of the General Council of Economists of Spain. (2018)
- Honorary Member of the Register of Economists Auditors of the General Council of Economists. (2018)
- "Premio a la Excelencia Académica" by the Catalan Association of Accounting and Management. (2019)
- Honorary Member of the Central College of Commercial and Business Graduates of Madrid. (2019)
- "Auditor Distinguido" by the Association of Chartered Accountants of Catalonia. (2019)
