= Jordi Wild =

Spanish YouTuber (born 1984)

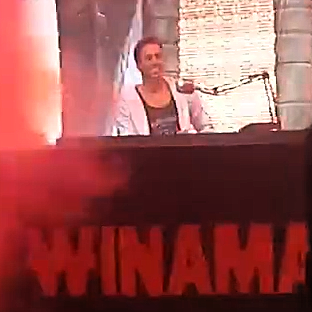
- Wild in 2024
- Born: Jorge Carrillo de Albornoz Torres; 28 August 1984 (age 42); Manresa, Catalonia, Spain
- Education: University of Barcelona
- Occupations: YouTuber; podcaster

YouTube information
- Channels: El Rincón de Giorgio; The Wild Project; DWT - Dogfight Wild Tournament
- Years active: 2013–present
- Genres: True crime, Let's Play, black humor, podcast
- Subscribers: 7.41 million (The Wild Project); 473 thousand (DWT - Dogfight Wild Tournament); 12.3 million (El Rincón de Giorgio)
- Views: 4.9 billion (The Wild Project); 36.2 million (DWT - Dogfight Wild Tournament); 1.8 billion (El Rincón de Giorgio)
- Last updated: 7 November 2026
- Website: jordiwild.com

Jorge Carrillo de Albornoz Torres (Spanish: [ˈɟʝoɾði kaˈriʎo ðe alβoɾˈnoθ ˈtores], Catalan: [ˈʒɔɾði]; born 28 August 1984), better known as Jordi Wild, is a Spanish YouTuber, podcaster and psychologist. His YouTube channel, El Rincón de Giorgio, was created in March 2013, and reached 7 million subscribers in 2017; he currently has more than 12 million subscribers.

He published three books entitled Sueños de Acero y Neón (Dreams of Steel and Neon), Jorgemyte, agente de la PEM (Jorgemyte, Agent of the Mexican Special Police), and Así es la puta vida (That's Fucking Life). Jordi Wild currently runs a series of podcasts known as The Wild Project, for which he won the 2022 ESLAND award for Best Talk Show. The podcast has also received multiple positive reviews.

== Biography ==
Jordi Carrillo de Albornoz Torres was born on 28 August 1984 in Manresa, Catalonia, Spain. Jordi created his YouTube channel, El Rincón de Giorgio, in March 2013, however, his oldest video dates back to August of that same year. During his career as a YouTuber he has collaborated with other YouTubers such as Luzuvlogs, Zorman and AuronPlay. In 2016, he published a short film entitled Wild: la pelicula (Wild: the movie), and in 2017, he left YouTube during a while. Later he returned with a gangsta rap video clip known as "YouTube: Estado Crítico" (YouTube: Critical State), in collaboration with rapper Dante.

In 2018, he made the script and participated in the casting of VENDETTA: La Película (VENDETTA: The Movie), and in October 2019 he participated in the cast of a short film called Ella llevaba una diadema azul (She was wearing a Blue Diadem). In 2020 he started an interview podcast series known as The Wild Project. In an interview on the RockZone website, he stated that he was inspired by the Joe Rogan podcasts, and was flattered that they called him the "Spanish Joe Rogan". The Wild Project has almost always been in the fourth position of the list of the most listened to Spanish podcasts on Spotify in 2021, and on 28 December he top the list of Spotify. In January 2022, Jordi Wild's The Wild Project won the Best Talk Show of the year category from Esland Awards, at Palau de la Música Catalana, Barcelona. In June 2022, he celebrated his 150th episode of his podcast with a special episode that lasted 25 hours. In 2022 he released his first fragrance under the name of 'Olvidona'.

In September 2024, amidst the Venezuelan political crisis, Jordi interviewed Venezuelan opposition leader María Corina Machado on the 290th episode of his podcast. In response, Nicolás Maduro criticized both Machado and Wild, saying that "he thinks that just because he is an influencer in Spain, he could be decisive in Venezuela." However, in doing so, Maduro referred to Jordi Wild as "Will" and described him as "a guy dedicated to animals". Spanish media points that Maduro likely confused Jordi's The Wild Project with Frank Cuesta's Wild Frank. Maduro then threatened Jordi by saying "Will Project, you now messed with Venezuela. You will dry, Will, you will dry! I tell you so from Caracas: By Bolívar's spirit, you will dry, my friend. Dried up! I will see you dried up!" On his X account, Jordi posted the video of Maduro's threat and laughed by saying "I am crying." Frank Cuesta, whom Maduro mistakenly alluded to, replied Jordi's post with "so, neither you nor I can go there at the moment hahahaha." Jordi further mocked Maduro's threat on social media by posting a picture of himself with the text "Drying up, me? I'm more about getting panties wet," and by asking his followers to create an image for his Dogfight Wild Tournament of a triple threat match between him, Maduro, and Elon Musk with Donald Trump as the special guest referee. In January 2026, after learning that Maduro was captured by the United States, Wild took to social media and ironized by posting "Maduro, who's dried up now, huh? Come on, take care."

On 5 November 2024, Jordi announced that his father, Jordi Carrillo de Albornoz, had died at the age of 71. He was mostly known as Papa Giorgio, an occasional character in El rincón de Giorgio, as well as an invitee to The Wild Project.

In the run-up to the 2026 Spanish general election, in early November 2026 he interviewed three of the four main candidates for the premiership: Pedro Sánchez, Alberto Núñez Feijóo and Ada Colau.

== Awards and nominations ==
Year	Award	Category	Work	Result	Ref.
2022	ESLAND Awards	Talk Show of the Year	The Wild Project	Won	
2023	ESLAND Awards	Talk Show of the Year	The Wild Project	Won	
2024	ESLAND Awards	Event of the year	Dogfight Wild Tournament	Nominated	

== Filmography ==
Year	Title	Role
2016	Wild: la pelicula	
2018	VENDETTA: La Película	Tommaso Marino
2019	Ella llevaba una diadema azul	Detective
