= Dani el Rojo =

Spanish mafia boss turned actor and writer

Daniel Rojo Bonilla
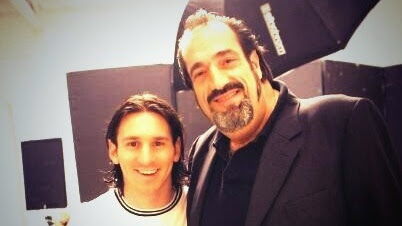
- Dani el Rojo (right) with footballer Lionel Messi.
- Born: 1962 (age 63–64); Barcelona, Spain
- Other names: Dani el Rojo; El Millonario
- Criminal charges: Bank robbery Extortion

Daniel Rojo Bonilla (born December 2, 1962), best known as Dani el Rojo and El Millonario, is a Spanish former mafia boss, active in the 1980s and 1990s. After serving fourteen consecutive years in prison, he developed a career as a bodyguard, writer and occasional actor and singer.

== Biography ==
He was born in a wealthy family of Guinardó and started his career as an outlaw during the Franco dictatorship. He describes his first crime as attacking teacher who had allegedly tried to molest him. He became a drug addict and a burglar by 13, and by 16 he had committed his first bank robbery. For a time he was part of a street gang with José María Sanz, later known as the singer Loquillo.

Rojo and his associates came to the extent of robbing five banks per day. They were officially convinced by around 150 robberies, although Rojo believes the actual number is much higher, possibly surpassing 500. His stolen goods would be worth €60 million. He stated, "I spent almost all of it in whoring, cars and drugs; the rest I squandered it." A practitioner of judo, karate and boxing, Rojo committed one of his robberies armed with a nunchaku in imitation of Bruce Lee.

He served multiple prison terms in the infamous La Model penitentiary center in Barcelona, where he acquired HIV in 1986. In another of his ordeals, he was stabbed in the leg with a large shiv while taking down an opponent with a karate kick during a three-man attempt on his life. He was finally sentenced to 32 years in 1991, although he eventually only served 12 of these by good behavior. With the help of social services, he decided to leave crime behind, for which he successfully got off heroin and the rest of the drugs he took. He also studied the first course of a psychology degree. He knew his current wife during his recovery, after which he was hired by Loquillo as a merchandising consultant.

He later worked as a bodyguard and security expert for celebrities like Rosario Flores, Enrique Bunbury, Andrés Calamaro, Antonio Carmona, Paulina Rubio and Lionel Messi.

In 2010 he wrote with Lluc Oliveras a novelized trilogy of his criminal career, starting with Confesiones de un gánster de Barcelona. Four years later he followed with a sequel trilogy started with La venganza de Tiburón. He started taking film and television roles in 2015, and five years later he added a music career with Sie777e, releasing the album Millonario$.

== Bibliography ==
=== Fiction ===
- Confesiones de un gánster de Barcelona (2010)
- El gran golpe del gánster de Barcelona (2012)
- Mi vida en juego (2014)
- La venganza de Tiburón (2014)
- El secuestro de la Virgen negra (2014)
- Gran golpe en la pequeña Andorra (2015)

=== Non-fiction ===
- Así salí del infierno de las drogas (2017)
- Sobrevivir a la Modelo (2018)

== Discography ==
- Millonario$ (2020)

== Filmography ==
=== Film ===
Year	Title	Role	Notes
2008	Loquillo, leyenda urbana	Himself	
2015	Spy Time	Joe the Butcher	
2016	Boy Missing	Bouncer	

=== Television ===
Year	Title	Role	Notes
2008	La Riera	Thug	
