= Antonio Maestre =

Spanish documentalist and journalist

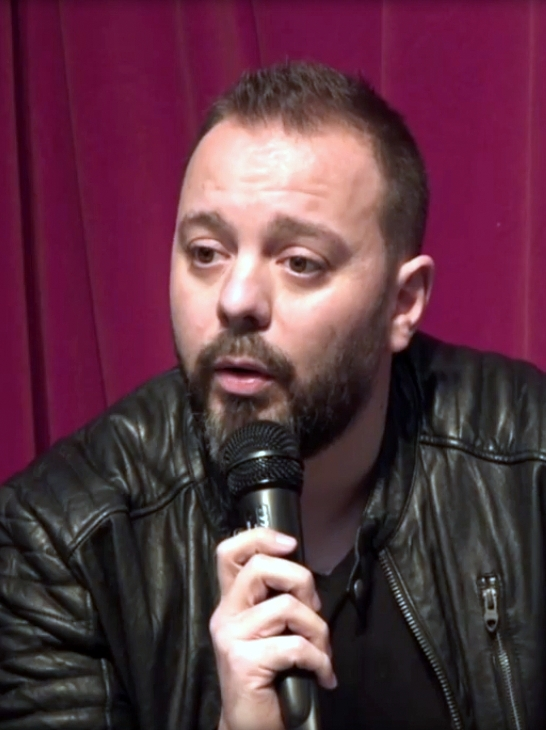
- Born: 18 June 1979; Getafe

Antonio Maestre Hernández (born 1979) is a Spanish journalist and documentalist.

== Biography ==
Born in 1979 in Getafe (a suburb of Madrid), he was however raised in neighbouring Fuenlabrada, where he currently lives. Maestre earned a degree in Documentation science from the Complutense University of Madrid (UCM), and also took post-graduate studies in journalism from the King Juan Carlos University (URJC). He worked as documentalist at the newcast services of TVE. A collaborator for eldiario.es from September 2013 to April 2014 and also for La Marea, he has also occasionally written pieces for Le Monde Diplomatique and Jacobin.

A regular TV talk show guest at El programa de Ana Rosa (T5) and La Sexta noche and Al Rojo Vivo (la Sexta), in September 2019, his return as regular collaborator to the opinion section of eldiario.es was announced. Maestre started this new spell at the Ignacio Escolar's online newspaper with a piece titled "Felipism is reborn, long live to Pedrism" at the Zona Crítica section.

== Works ==
- — (2019). Franquismo S.A. Ediciones Akal.
- — (2020). Infames, el retroceso de España. Penguin Random House.
