= Samanta Villar =

Spanish journalist

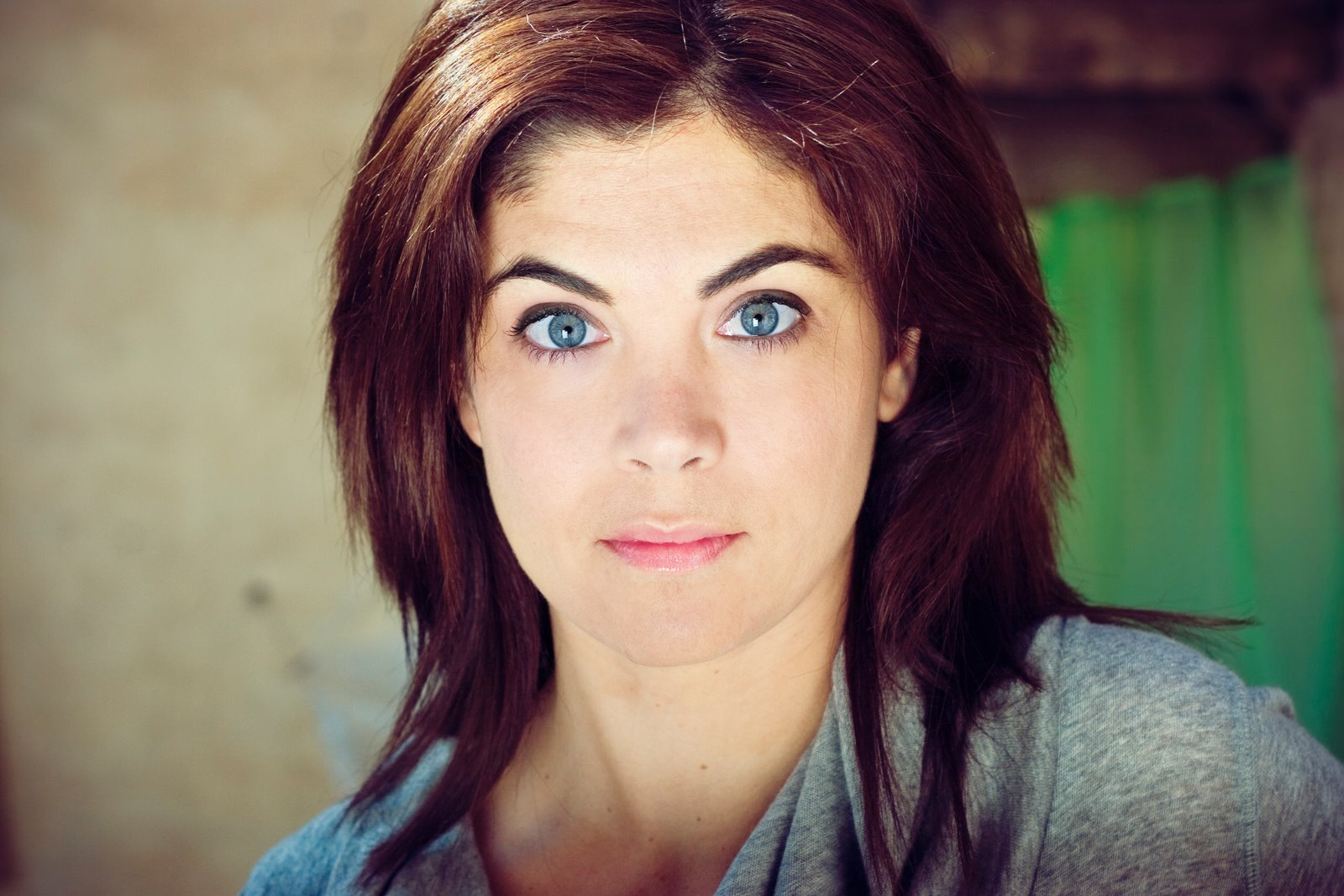
- Villar in 2006
- Born: Samanta Villar Fitó; September 16, 1975 (age 50); Barcelona, Spain
- Occupation: Journalist
- Years active: 1998-present
- Spouse: Raúl Calabria (m. 2015)
- Children: 2

Samanta Villar Fitó (born September 16, 1975, Barcelona) is a Spanish journalist.

She studied Journalism at the Autonomous University of Barcelona (postgraduate course in Actors' Direction at the Ramon Llull University) and drama with Nancy Muñón.

She started her professional career as a production assistant at TV3.

== Television programmes ==
- News broadcasting, Viladecans Televisió, 1998
- Agenda cultural, Barcelona Televisió, 1999
- News broadcasting in TVE Catalonia, 1999–2005
- España Directo, TVE 2005-2007
- News broadcasting in Canal 3/24, Televisió de Catalunya. 2007- 2008
- 21 días, Cuatro, 2008–2010.
- Conexión Samanta, Cuatro (2010 - February 2016).
- Nueve meses con Samanta Cuatro (April 2016)
- Samanta Y... Cuatro (November 2017)
- La vida con Samanta Cuatro (2019)
- Avui sortim Cuatro (2022)
- A media mañana, Radio Nacional de España (September 2022 - July 2023)
- Desnudos por la vida (until December 2023).
- L'Entrellat Radio 4 (since Sep 2024) Talk show in catalan language.

== Personal life ==
She has been in a relationship with Raul Calabria since 2015 and is the mother of twins born in 2016.
