= Carmen Porter =

Spanish journalist (born 1974)

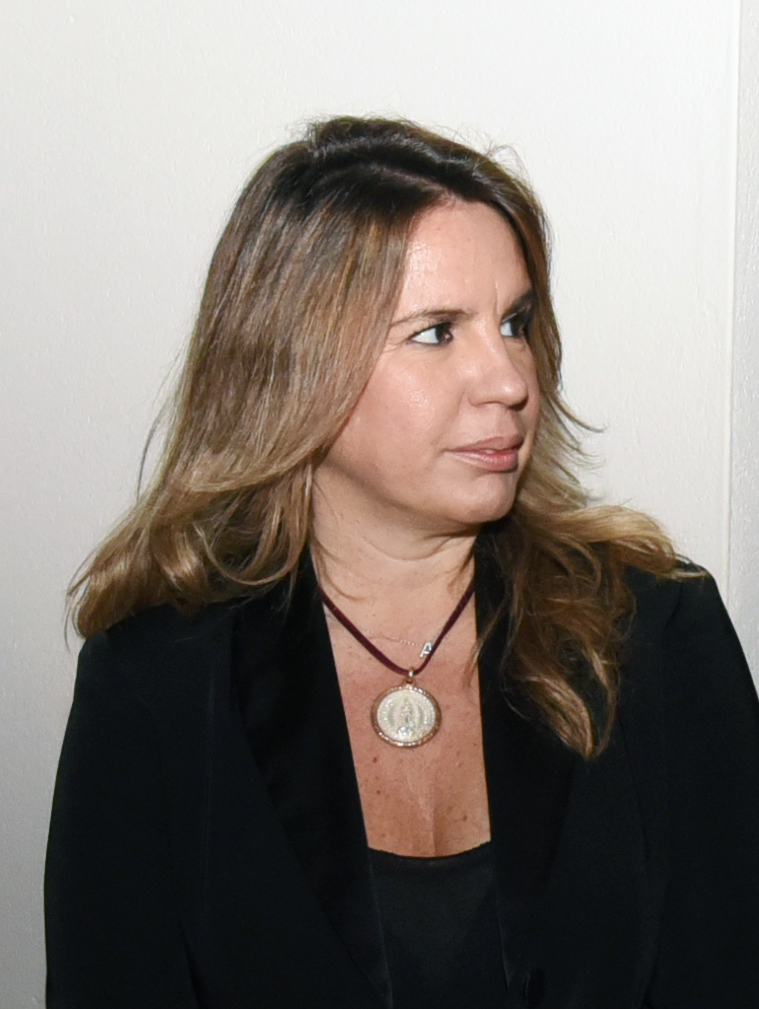
- Carmen Porter in 2017
- Born: 23 August 1974 (age 52); Madrid, Spain
- Education: Complutense University of Madrid; European University of Madrid
- Occupations: Journalist, paranormal investigator, TV presenter
- Spouse: Iker Jiménez (m. 1994)
- Children: 1

Carmen María Porter Ucha (born 23 August 1974) is a Spanish journalist, who, alongside her husband Iker Jiménez, presents the successful television programme on paranormal phenomena and mysteries Cuarto Milenio since 2005 and the investigative programme Horizonte since 2020.

== Early life and education ==
Porter was born on 23 August 1971 in Madrid, Spain and the family moved to Province of Alicante, where she grew up. Her father was a builder and her family is of Basque, Galician and English origin. As a child, she was abducted by a stranger on the street, although she was recovered shortly afterwards.

She studied journalism at the Complutense University of Madrid and the European University of Madrid.

== Career ==
She began her professional career as a journalist working for the magazines, Más Allá de la Ciencia and Enigmas, investigating paranormal phenomena; becoming editor-in-chief of the latter.

Porter made her radio debut alongside her husband Iker Jiménez in 2002, co-hosting the Cadena SER mystery programme Milenio 3 until 2015.

In November 2005, she appeared for the first time co-presenting the new mystery television programme alongside her husband Iker again the successful Cuarto milenio in Cuatro channel presenting the section "News from the Unknown" and in which she spoke about American astronaut Buzz Aldrin's statements about the UFO sighting during the Apollo 11 moon mission. Since then, her appearances have become regular.

Porter and her husband are also administrators of two production companies, Producciones Digitales Milenio 3 SL and Alma Productora Audiovisual SL, with millions in turnover. They also organised the exhibition "Cuarto milenio", which toured several cities in Spain and was very successful.

Since 2020, she co-presents the investigative programme Horizonte which originated from their YouTube channel "La estirpe de los libres" during the COVID-19 pandemic in Spain.

At the end of 2024, both were heavily criticised after stating on live television that there were many dead bodies in one of the car parks flooded by the 2024 Spanish floods that devastated Valencia in October of that year, a claim that the authorities rejected and, in fact, no dead bodies were found.

== Personal life ==
Porter met Iker Jiménez in a house party she organised at her home in Madrid. They married in 1994 and their daughter, Alma, was born in 2011.

== Professional activity ==
=== Radio ===
- Milenio 3 (Cadena SER, 2002–2015)

=== Television ===
- Cuarto milenio (since 2005) in Cuatro
- Al otro lado (2013) in Telecinco
- Horizonte (since 2020) in Cuatro
- Futura (2022) in Cuatro

== Books ==
- Misterios de la Iglesia (Mysteries of the Church) Ed. EDAF, S. A., 2002. ISBN 8441411042
- La sábana Santa: ¿Fotografía de Jesucristo? (The Shroud of Turin: A Photograph of Jesus Christ?). Ed. EDAF, S. A., 2003. ISBN 8441412413
- La Iglesia y sus demonios (The Church and its Demons). Ed. EDAF, S. A., 2005. ISBN 8441417733
- Milenio 3: El libro (Milenio 3: The Book). Aguilar, S. A., 2006. ISBN 8403097107
