= Frank Cuesta =

Spanish TV host

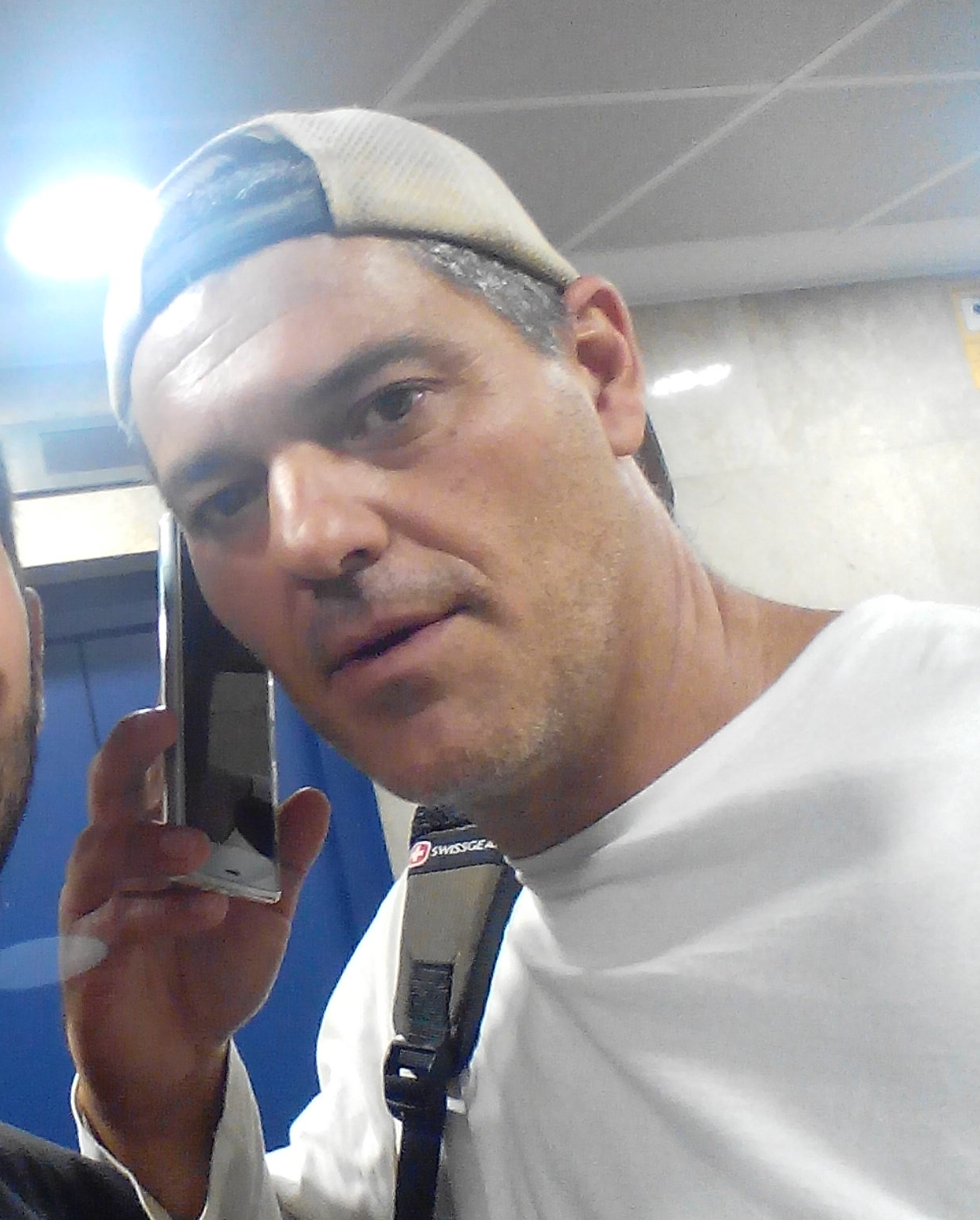
- Cuesta in 2017
- Born: Francisco Javier Cuesta Ramos; 16 October 1971 (age 55); León, Spain
- Occupation: Animal rights activist, tennis coach, adventurer, television presenter, Youtuber
- Spouse: Yuyee Alissa Intusmith (m. 2012; div. 2012)

Kick information
- Channel: frankcuesta
- Years active: 2024–present
- Followers: 128 thousand (October 13, 2024)

Twitch information
- Channel: frank_cuesta
- Years active: 2021–2024
- Followers: 422 thousand

YouTube information
- Channel: Frank Cuesta - En Directo
- Years active: 2019–present
- Genre: Wildlife
- Subscribers: 4 million
- Views: 565 million

Francisco Javier Cuesta Ramos (born 16 October 1971), also known as Frank Cuesta (Spanish pronunciation: [fɾaŋ(k) ˈkwesta]), is a Spanish adventurer, television presenter, tennis coach, and YouTuber.

Born in León, Cuesta devoted his early years to tennis, learning from figures such as Nick Bollettieri, Guillermo Vilas, Pete Sampras, and Jim Courier. At a very young age, an injury marred his tennis career, but he kept training with Bollettieri until he asked Cuesta to move to Thailand to open an academy. Once in Bangkok, Cuesta became growingly interested in wildlife.

His interest in animals brought him to fame with the TV show Frank de la Jungla, for which he won a Premio Ondas in 2011 for the category of Innovation or Television Quality. The show spawned two spin-offs: La Selva en Casa and Natural Frank. All three shows were broadcast by Cuatro. A fourth show, Wild Frank, was broadcast by Discovery International.

== Devotion to wildlife ==
Cuesta describes himself as uninterested in interaction with humans, rather preferring to interact with animals. After his training sessions with Nick Bollettieri, he used to sit by a lake to interact with the animals.

In 2021, Cuesta purchased a 37 ha (91-acre) land to set a sanctuary, dedicated to animals that he cannot release to the wild. On 27 February 2025 he was arrested for illegal possession of wild animals.

== Controversies ==
=== Frank Cuesta vs Asturias ===
In 2012, the Spanish Herpetological Association criticized the TV show La Selva en Casa, presented by Cuesta. The association denounced that the program "ignores any educational purpose" and "does not present a specific theme", also expressing concerns over the treatment of reptiles and amphibians in the program. Later that year, the association notified the government of the Principality of Asturias, who then imposed three fines, worth €11,501, to Cuesta, as well as to the director and producer of the show, Sonia López and Molinos de Viento, respectively. The reason is that Cuesta allegedly stressed the animals while recording the show. In October 2014, a judge in Oviedo declared that Cuesta did not stress any animal during the recordings, thus nullifying the fine.

During a podcast with fellow YouTuber Jordi Wild in late 2020, Cuesta revealed more details about this incident: He was holding a viper with the intention to urge people not to attack them, and the Spanish Herpetological Association claimed he had stressed the snake. Cuesta later complained about the treatment he received from biologists in his native country, saying, "that is Spain... If you triumph, you are [considered] a douchebag."

=== Yuyee's imprisonment ===
Cuesta was married to a Thai singer and model known as Yuyee, who was arrested on 9 November 2012 after being caught with five milligrams of cocaine upon her arrival to Thailand from Vietnam. In 2014, she was sentenced to fifteen years in prison and imposed a ฿1.5 million fine for drug smuggling. No individual in Thailand had previously been sentenced for amounts under 250 milligrams of cocaine, and sentences usually spanned three or four years. Cuesta claimed that the arrest was actually a retaliation against his activism against wildlife smuggling. In an interview with Pablo Motos in El Hormiguero, Cuesta explained that he and Yuyee had taken a leopard from traffickers who planned to smuggle the animal to Dubai, causing one of them to threaten Cuesta, who recalled the incident by saying,

After some days, this person [the smuggler], who is no longer in Thailand as he fled after the coup d'état, showed up in front of me and told me, "I want you to know that we will destroy your life and break your heart," and a month later, this [the arrest] happened.

He later expressed his desire to contact either the King of Spain Felipe VI or his father, King Emeritus Juan Carlos I, as they were "the only people" able to contact Thailand's royal house to grant a pardon to Yuyee.

Cuesta proposed that Yuyee was arrested in his stead due to the Spanish government's lack of authority over a Thai citizen:

They would have had to let me go, and in two months, I would have been in Spain, but it happens that she is Thai... What is the best way of messing with me? By messing with my children. How do you mess with my children? By taking their mother.

— Frank Cuesta, Jordi Wild's The Wild Project

While Yuyee is a Thai citizen for whom the Spanish royalty had no reason to intercede, he asked them to do so "to solve this problem for three Spanish children."

Frank Cuesta has expressed his anger towards the individual whom he believes is responsible of Yuyee's arrest by threatening to kill his son. He said, "if one day I have the opportunity, I will eat the liver of that guy's son. But I will not have the chance, obviously."

Yuyee was released from prison on 12 November 2020, after a long battle during which Cuesta says they had to endure numerous humiliations. She reappeared to the public eye through a video on Frank Cuesta's YouTube channel in December 2020, helping Cuesta with a snake.

=== Views on activism ===
Frank Cuesta has caused controversy because of his views on modern activism.

Despite being considered an animal-rights activist, Cuesta declares himself an "anti-animal-rights-activist" (in Spanish: antianimalista), saying that "the animal rights movement should be called 'subsidyism', the art of making money from anywhere." During his first appearance on Jordi Wild's podcast The Wild Project, he criticized the radicalization of both veganism and the animal rights movement, stating that social media has led people to believe they are animal-rights advocates without an actual understanding of animal life. As an example, he cites American YouTuber Hofit Kim Cohen, who considers herself an animal-rights advocate, but visited a Japanese owl cafe, a practice that Cuesta has largely criticized because of the extensive smuggling of owls that such businesses demand.

== Personal life ==
In early 2015, Cuesta revealed that he struggled with cancer in the past. In late 2019, he announced through social-media video that his cancer had returned; in the video, he refers to himself as an animal whose scientific name is Crocus guarrus pelatus. Months later, he revealed that he was specifically suffering leukemia, which he was struggled with for over sixteen years. In July, Cuesta published a video announcing that the ailment "will likely finish me off in the future" and "for seventeen years, I've been saying that life is a marvelous shit."

With Yuyee, he had four children: three boys (Zipi, Zape, and Zorro) and one girl, known as Zen. A fifth child, Pepsi, was adopted by the couple in 2013. One of his oldest sons, Zipi, died shortly after birth. Zipi's twin brother, Zape, is a goalkeeper who has played for the youth teams of Fuenlabrada and Alcorcón.

Cuesta is of Cuban descent through one of his grandfathers.
