= Nuria Roca =

Spanish television presenter

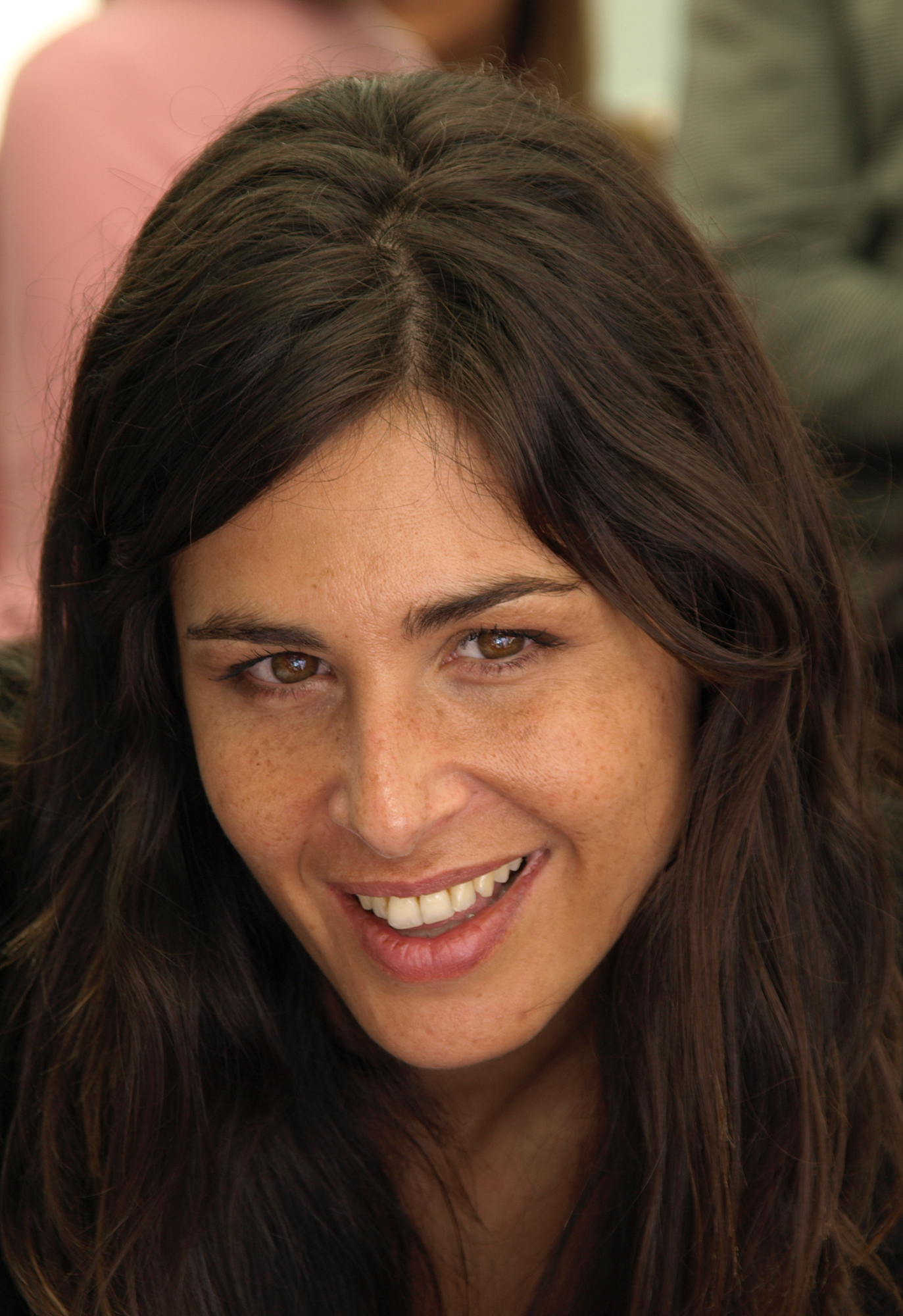
- Nuria Roca in April 2008
- Born: Nuria Roca Granell; 23 March 1972 (age 54); Moncada, Valencia
- Occupations: Writer, tv presenter, actress, radio announcer and architect
- Years active: 1994–present
- Spouse: Juan del Val
- Children: Olivia (b. 2010)

Nuria Roca Granell (born 23 March 1972 in Moncada, Valencia) is a Spanish writer, TV presenter, actress, radio announcer and architect.

In 2003 she finished her studies at the Universidad Politécnica de Valencia In 1999 she hosted the TV programme ¿Cuánto cuesta?. Between 2003 and 2005 she presented La isla de los famosos on Antena 3 and in 2004 UHF.

In 2017 she started to present the TV program Fantastic Duo in La 1. In December 2017 she returned to Cuatro after being seven years out Mediaset España and she presented the dating show Singles XD. The program was cancelled the same month after thirteen episodes due to the low share.

In September 2018 she became a team member in the Spanish talk show El hormiguero.

== Personal life ==
She got married the writer and businessman Juan del Val and they keep an open marriage. She has a son named Juan born in 2002, a son named Pau born in 2006 and a daughter named Olivia born in 2010.

== Filmography ==
- El hombre de tu vida (2016) as Lucía
- La que se avecina (2014) Lidia
- Aída (2014) as Claudia
- Calabazas (2013) as Berta Sandoval
- Saturday Night Live (2009) as Bellísima
- Javier ya no vive solo (2002–2003) as Sofía Castelló
- 7 vidas (2001) as Clara Romero
