= Josep Lobató =

Spanish broadcaster (born 1977)

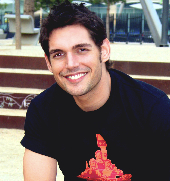
- Josep Lobató Pérez in 2009
- Born: Josep Lobató i Pérez; June 16, 1977 (age 48); Esplugues de Llobregat, Spain
- Years active: 1998-2015
- Known for: Presenter, Radio personalities

Josep Lobató i Pérez (born June 16, 1977 in Esplugues de Llobregat) is a Spanish radio and television presenter.

He studied design and combined these studies with several courses of communications and show presenting.

He started in radio programs when he was 16 years old and has taken part in many radio or television programs and published several books. He has also participated in university conferences and some publications.

His radio program Ponte a Prueba (Put Yourself to the Test) won an Ondas Price for Best Radio Program in 2007.

== Personal life ==
In 2015, Josep was diagnosed with a demyelinating disease that causes problems with his ability to speak. The effects of the disease meant Josep was no longer able to continue his broadcast media work. Since then, he has undergone speech therapy.

== Television programs ==
- Cuatro - "20P", 2009
- Cuatro - "La batalla de los coros" 2009.
- Cuatro - "Circus, Más difícil todavía" 2008
- TVE 1 - "¡Quiero Bailar!" 2008
- Cuatro - "Money, money" 2007/2008
- Cuatro - "El Sexómetro" 2007
- Cuatro - "Channel Fresh" 2007
- TV3 - "Prohibit als tímids" 2006
- Flaix TV - "FlaixMania" 2001/2005
- Discovery Channel - "Discovery en el Fòrum" 2004

== Radio programs ==
- Happy FM - "Zona Vip" Actualmente
- Europa FM - "Ponte A Prueba" 2006-2008
- Ràdio Flaixbac - "Prohibit Als Pares" 2003/2006
- COM Ràdio - "Bon dia lluna" ("Balli qui pugui") 1999
- Top Radio - 1998

== Books ==
- "Ponte A Prueba 2" (Ediciones del Bronce / Editorial Planeta/2008)
- "Ponte A Prueba, Confidencial" (Ediciones del Bronce / Editorial Planeta/2007)
- "Ponte A Prueba, El libro" (Ediciones del Bronce / Editorial Planeta/2007)
- "Posa't A Prova" (Edicions Columna / Editorial Planeta/2007)
- "Som PAP, la nostra vida, el nostre rotllo" (RBA/2006)
- "Prohibit als Pares" (RBA/2005)
