= Hospital Universitario Ramón y Cajal =

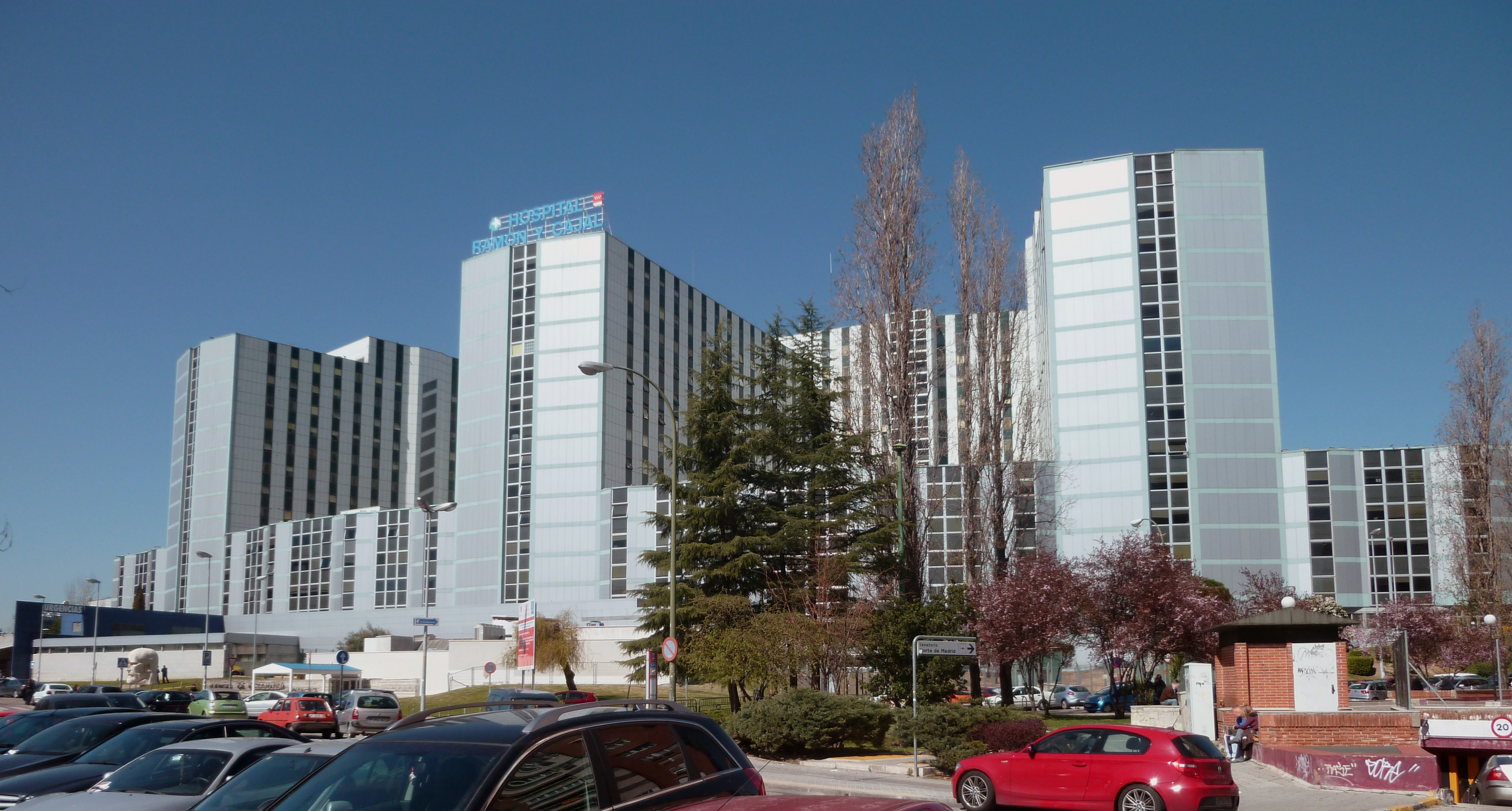

Geography
- Location: M-607, km 9, 28034, Madrid, Community of Madrid, Spain
- Coordinates: 40.487208°N 3.693883°W

Organisation
- Funding: Public hospital
- Type: Teaching
- Affiliated university: University of Alcalá
- Network: Servicio Madrileño de Salud

Services
- Beds: 901

History
- Opened: 18 October 1977

Links
- Lists: Hospitals in Spain

The Hospital Universitario Ramón y Cajal is a public general hospital located in the Valverde neighborhood, in Madrid, Spain, part of the hospital network of the Servicio Madrileño de Salud.

It is one of the healthcare institutions associated to the University of Alcalá for the purpose of clinical internship.

== History ==
Named after the Spanish winner of Nobel Prize for Medicine Santiago Ramón y Cajal, it was opened on 18 October 1977, receiving the nickname of el piramidón, after Pyramidon, a analgesic administered very often at the time. It was criticised back then because of its location, cost and size.

It developed the first service for pediatric cardiology in Spain in 1977 and the first cardiac rehabilitation unit in 1979. Aside from the teaching and medical attention features, it is noted by its research prowess (the first in the region in scientific research production), particularly in the scope of clinical microbiology and infectious diseases. As of 2017 it has 901 beds. At the peak of the COVID-19 pandemic in Madrid, in March and April 2020, the hospital had 994 beds occupied by patients with COVID-19.
