= Iker Jiménez =

Spanish journalist (born 1973)

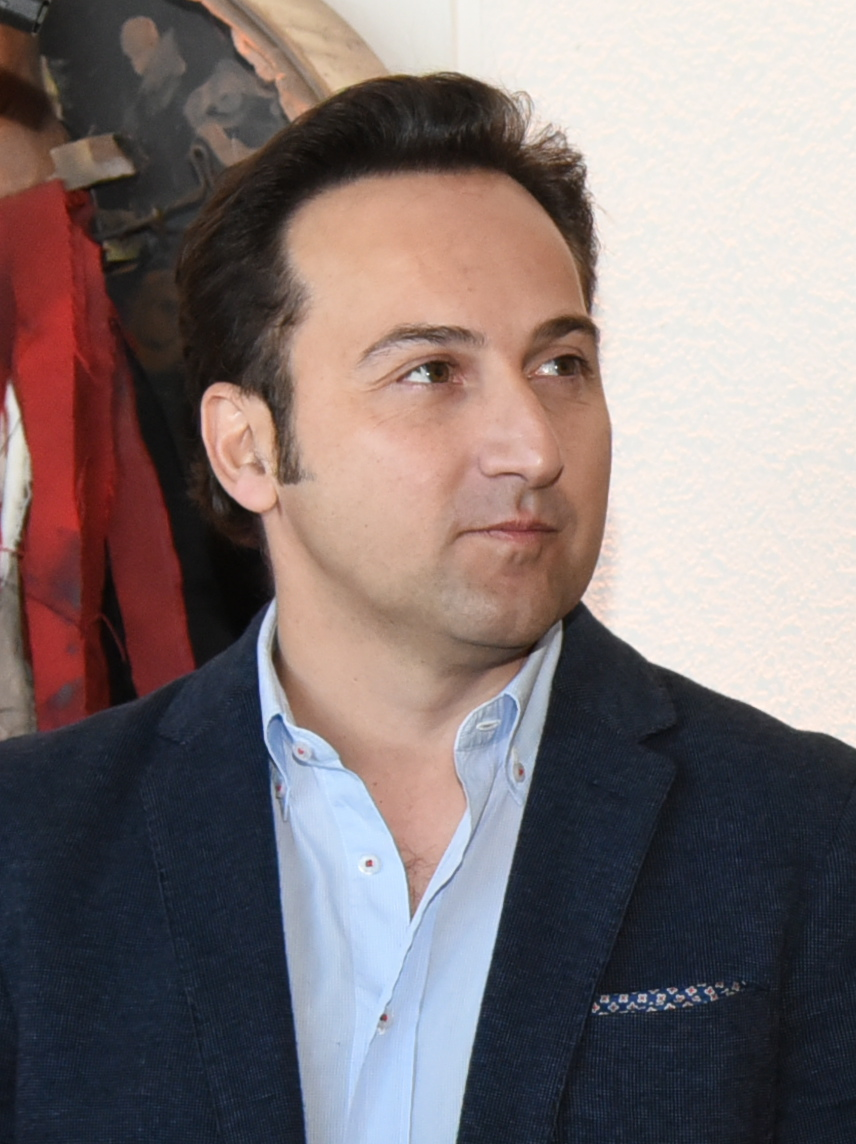
- Iker Jiménez in 2017
- Born: Iker Jiménez Elizari; 10 January 1973 (age 53); Vitoria, Spain
- Education: Universidad Complutense de Madrid; Universidad Europea de Madrid
- Occupations: Journalist, TV presenter, writer, YouTuber, radio presenter, paranormal investigator and ufologist
- Spouse: Carmen Porter
- Children: 1
- Website: ikerjimenez.com

Iker Jiménez Elizari (born 10 January 1973) is a Spanish journalist and television host. He is a graduate in sciences of information from the Complutense University of Madrid and the European University of Madrid, and gained prominence directing and presenting, along with his wife and collaborator Carmen Porter, mystery investigation program Milenio 3 in Cadena SER, after which they moved to television with the program Cuarto Milenio in Cuatro. In 2020 he created the YouTube podcast La Estirpe de los Libres, and the same year started presenting the divulgation program Horizonte, initially in Telecinco and later in Cuatro.

For his work in Milenio 3 and Cuarto Milenio eminently, Jiménez has been called by several newspapers one of the premier communicators in Spanish media, as well as one of the most parodied and criticized. While he has been accused on occasions of promoting trash TV, he has also been profusely awarded for journalistic and communicative merits, having three Antenas de Oro and one Premio Ondas on his resume along with several other awards.

== Biography ==
He was born in Vitoria, and has a bachelor's degree in journalism from both the Universidad Complutense de Madrid and the Universidad Europea de Madrid.

He is married to Carmen Porter, also a journalist and team member of both Milenio 3 and Cuarto Milenio. His first daughter, Alma Jiménez Porter, was born in 2011.

== Career ==
He has been the presenter of mystery programs on radio and publisher of many articles about paranormal activity.

He started in 1990 on small radio stations in Madrid until he went to some of the most important Spanish radio stations: Onda Madrid, Radio Voz, Radio Intercontinental, Antena 3, Onda Cero, Cadena SER and Radio Nacional de España. He has also worked in TV programs for Telecinco, Antena 3 or Cuatro TV.

He founded the CD-Rom magazine, CD Magazine and wrote some articles for several publications.

He has been the presenter and director of the radio program Milenio 3 in Cadena SER. Milenio 3 was the leader program in the Saturday late night Spanish radio and also in other schedules in which it was previously broadcast. Milenio 3 came to an end on 28 June 2015, after 14 seasons on air.

He currently presents the television program Cuarto Milenio (Fourth Millennium). Started in 2006, Cuarto Milenio is the most popular program of the Spanish channel Cuatro and the oldest of the programs broadcast by Cuatro.

He also started a self-produced live show in YouTube in 2018, Milenio Live. He finished the show in September 2021 in order to focus on other projects, leaving his activity in YouTube to his secondary podcast La Estirpe de los Libres.

== Political views ==
When asked about his ideology in 2015, Jiménez stated, "yes, I'm an anti-establishment, like Félix Rodríguez de la Fuente. I'm not saying this in a political sense. I consider myself liberal in everything." He also described himself as believing on individual merit over state and parasitism. In 2020, he stated further, "I belong to nobody, I'm not a member of any political party, any flag or any trend, in fact I can see positive things in both sides." Similarly, he felt himself targeted by both the left and right wing for his mediatic role during the COVID-19 pandemic in Spain.

In an article published in 2020, journalist Antonio Maestre accused Jiménez of being an "anti-Marxist" and having become a "guru to the far right in Spain" through his work while embracing a "deideologized" profile as TV host. Jiménez answered enumerating inaccuracies in Maestre's article, while the resultant controversy saw Maestre both being supported and attracting his own critiques, including from other journalists.

Also in 2020, Jiménez stated that, due to his work in Horizonte about the COVID-19 pandemic, he had been attacked in social media by pandemic conspiracy theorists, some of them being former followers of his. He replied to those views, stating, "I must have done something wrong for many years. Firstly so as not to be believed. To be thought a traitor. Secondly so as not to know how make understand that this is not a joke and that unfortunately the pandemic is real and quite uncontrollable." He later further criticized them, describing them as "the greatest blunder ever".

== Works ==
In 1999 he wrote Enigmas sin resolver. He is also the author of El paraíso maldito (2000), Enigmas sin Resolver II (2000), Camposanto (2005) based on Hieronymus Bosch's life, Fronteras de lo imposible, Encuentro and Milenio 3: El libro (2006).

=== Notable television works ===
- La noche del fin del mundo (director of that documentary about the Chernobyl disaster)
- El Síndrome (documentary about the 1981 toxic oil syndrome)

== Professional activity ==
=== Radio ===
- Milenio 3 (2002-2015), Cadena SER.
- Universo Iker (2015-presente), Radioset.

=== Television ===
- Cuarto Milenio (2005–present), Cuatro.
- Cuarto Milenio Zoom (2016-2017), Cuatro.
- Horizonte (2020–present), Telecinco and later Cuatro.

=== Internet ===
- Milenio Live (2018-2021), YouTube and Mtmad.
- La Estirpe de los Libres (2020–present), YouTube.

== Awards ==
In 2004, Jiménez was awarded the Antena de Oro, given by the Federation of Radio and Television Associations of Spain to the most outstanding professionals in the field of the audiovisual industry, for his radio program Milenio 3. Also in 2004, he was given the Award to the Best Journalist by the Association of Victims of 11-M. Two years later, Jiménez was voted Televisive Personality of the Year with 43,5% of the voting in Grupo Vocento, the leading multimedia communications group in Spain.

In 2007 and 2008, he was respectively awarded the 10th Trufa de Oro, granted by the union of radio broadcasting stations of Vitoria, and the Arias Montano Communication Award, also given to his collaborators Carmen Porter and Javier Sierra. 2010 saw Jiménez being handed the Insignia de Plata by the Spanish Society of Criminology and Forensic Sciences (SECCIF), along with Feliciano Trebolle, president of the Provincial Audience of Valladolid.

Jiménez won again the Antena de Oro for his work in Cuarto Milenio in 2015, the same year he was also awarded with the Premio Ondas for "his work as presenter, communicator and director". After three years, he would receive the Medal of Professional Merit in the Congress of Applied Criminalistics I in Noia, as well as the 2018 Award for Support to Rare Diseases by the Hospital Clínico San Carlos of Madrid.

In 2019, he was awarded the Gran Cruz de las Víctimas del Terrorismo, by the Historical Association of the Civil Guard, for his work in Cuarto Milenio. The following year, Jiménez was gifted a Medal of Police Merit by Jesús Montero from the National Police Corps by his communicative work during the COVID-19 pandemic in Spain. He was also awarded the Independent Award of Communication and Television by the Unión por Leganés.

Also for his work in the pandemic, Jiménez received in 2021 the Honor Award to the Best TV and Radio Communicator by Fundación Gala. Horizonte would earn him the Gran Cruz a la Solidaridad COVID-19 of the Civil Guard and Jiménez's third Antena de Oro, coinciding with him winning the Arturo Duperier Award also in 2022.
