= Saturday Night Live (Spanish TV series) =

- Starring: Eva Hache; Yolanda Ramos; Secun de la Rosa; Edu Soto; Gorka Otxoa
- Country of origin: Spain
- Original language: Spanish
- No. of seasons: 1
- No. of episodes: 12

Production
- Production locations: Madrid, Spain
- Running time: 1 hour
- Production company: Globomedia

Original release
- Network: Cuatro
- Release: 5 February – 13 May 2009

Related
- Saturday Night Live

Saturday Night Live was the Spanish adaptation of the American comedy show of the same name. It aired on Cuatro from 5 February to 13 May 2009, originally on Thursday nights at 10:30pm and later on Wednesday nights at 10:45pm.

The show did not return for a second series, despite becoming Cuatro's most-watched entertainment series debut.

== Format ==
Each episode followed the same structure as the original US show: firstly, the host of the episode would take part in a sketch that ended with the phrase "¡estamos en directo y esto es Saturday Night Live!" (We are live and this is Saturday Night Live!). The show's intro played after this, followed by the host's monologue. Several sketches were then performed, followed by the segment "Las noticias del SNL" (The SNL News), presented by Gorka Otxoa and Eva Hache. A live performance by a guest artist or band ended the show.

== Cast ==
=== Main cast ===
- Eva Hache
- Yolanda Ramos
- Secun de la Rosa
- Edu Soto
- Gorka Otxoa

=== Recurring cast ===
- Daniel Ortiz
- Meritxell Duró
- Lucas Trapaza
- Manuela Burló
- César Camino
- Meritxell Huertas
- Ota Vallés

== Episodes ==
No.	Original release date	Guest(s)	Musical/entertainment guest(s)	Viewers (millions)	
1	5 February 2009	Antonio Resines	El canto del loco	2,547,000	13.8%
2	12 February 2009	Ramón García, Paco León	Manolo García	2,306,000	11.9%
3	19 February 2009	Amparo Baró	Muchachito Bombo Infierno	1,464,000	8.1%
4	26 February 2009	Fernando Tejero	N/A	1,660,000	9.1%
5	5 March 2009	Belén Rueda	N/A	2,052,000	11.7%
6	12 March 2009	Patricia Conde	N/A	1,813,000	10.7%
7	19 March 2009	Pepe Navarro	N/A	1,302,000	7.7%
8	26 March 2009	Florentino Fernández	N/A	1,409,000	8.1%
9	2 April 2009	Santiago Segura	N/A	1,417,000	7.9%
10	15 April 2009	Raffaella Carrà	N/A	1,471,000	8.4%
11	22 April 2009	Victoria Abril	N/A	1,301,000	7.0%
12	6 May 2009	Santi Millán	Nena Daconte	1,034,000	5.9%
