= Cuarto milenio =

Spanish television program

- Genre: Mystery
- Directed by: Fernando Rodriguez
- Presented by: Iker Jiménez; Carmen Porter
- Opening theme: The Old Kingdom by Rik Carter
- Country of origin: Spain
- Original language: Spanish
- No. of seasons: 15
- No. of episodes: (list of episodes)

Production
- Executive producer: Mediaset España
- Production companies: Plural Entertainment (2005 - 2011); Cuarzo (2011 - 2018); Alma Producciones Digitales (2018-present)

Original release
- Network: Cuatro
- Release: 16 November 2005 – July 2017

Related
- Horizonte

Cuarto milenio is a Spanish television program directed and presented by journalist Iker Jiménez and Carmen Porter. The program has been broadcast weekly on television channel Cuatro since November 2005, being the channel's longest running program.

The program explores a wide variety of topics, usually related to mystery and enigmas, though frequently reaching afield. They include conspiracy, archaeology, history, criminology, astronomy, medicine, physics, zoology, psychology, parapsychology and ufology. It regularly feature experts in various disciplines, like psychiatrists, physicists, physicians, historians, anthropologists, criminologists, astronomers, naturalists, writers or journalists.

Cuarto Milenio has been acknowledged to have an established place on Spanish television, not only due to its longevity, but also to its following and recognizability, having been considered a television phenomenon. Alternatively, it has been criticized as pseudoscientific, pointing to its treatment of esoteric and conspiratorial fields, and praised as a program of investigation and divulgation, standing out by its consistent presence of scientific authorities and specialists as guests.

The program has spawned two spin-offs; La mesa del coronel, a geopolitical program presented in 2019 by Col. Pedro Baños, and Horizonte, produced by the same team and ongoing since 2020.

== Team ==
- Iker Jiménez (direction and presentation)
- Carmen Porter (narration and co-presentation)
- Pablo Villarrubia (editorial)
- Francisco Pérez Caballero (editorial)
- Gerardo Peláez (editorial coordinator)
- Carlos Largo (editorial, also in Millennium 3)
- Javier Pérez Campos (editorial)
- Pablo Fuente (editorial)
- Guillermo León (crew and webmaster)
- Juan Villa (artistics)

=== Old team ===
- Luis Álvarez (editorial)
- Nacho Ares (editorial)
- Santiago Camacho (editorial, also in Millennium 3)
- Alberto Granados (editorial)
- Óscar Dorian (artistics)
- Juan Jesús Vallejo (editorial)
- Francisco Contreras Gil (editorial)
- Martín Cappelletti (Sub Address and Address of Conduct)

== Specials ==
On May 16, 2006, Cracking the Code aired, marking the theatrical release of The Da Vinci Code. The director and presenter of Cuarto Milenio conducted a special program that addressed the secrets and controversies raised by the book. On December 25, 2006, The Exodus Decoded special aired. This program discussed the documentary and research done by Felix Golubev and Simcha Jacobovici, about a proposed Jewish exodus from Egypt.

In 2007 the program aired a special about Jesus. A special emphasis was given to the apocryphal gospels.

In July 2008 a special on Chernobyl aired.

In April 2012 they presented a special about the sinking of the RMS Titanic.

== Collections ==
Colección Cuarto milenio was a book-DVD collection that included best programs of the first few seasons, which were available weekly in kiosks. There was another set released in 2011.

== Seasons ==
Cuarto Milenio is the oldest program of Cuatro, having been broadcast continuously since the channel began service in November 2005. The best ratings for the show were in the third season (2007–2008), with an average audience share of 13.2% (897,208 viewers). During the following seasons, the show has maintained an average audience of 600,000 viewers per night, representing around 10% of the audience share, the only program on Cuatro to reach such a high percentage.

Season	Date	Programs	nº
1	November 2005 – June 2006	36	1–36
2	September 2006 – June 2007	45	37–80
3	September 2007 – June 2008	46	81–124
4	September 2008 – June 2009	45	125–166
5	September 2009 – June 2010	36	167–202
6	September 2010 – June 2011	40	203–242
7	September 2011 – July 2012	42	243–284
8	September 2012 – July 2013	46	285–330
9	September 2013 – July 2014	44	331–374
10	September 2014 – July 2015	44	375–418
11	September 2015 – July 2016	44	419–462
12	September 2016 – July 2017	44	463–509
13	September 2017 – July 2018	44	507–550
14	September 2018 – July 2019	44	551–594
15	September 2019 – January 2021	44	595–638
16	January 2021 – July 2021	27	639–665
17	September 2021 – July 2022	46	666–711
18	September 2022 – July 2023	44	712–755
19	September 2023 – July 2024	43	756–798
20	September 2024 – present	TBA	799–

== Awards ==
- Best divulgation program in 2006, voted in the portal ¡Vaya Tele!.
- Silver Medal for Mejor Cabecera Gráfica internacional at the «Festival Internacional de Televisión y Cine de Nueva York» 2010.
- Best investigation program at the Telemagazine Awards 2019.

== Criticism ==
Cuarto Milenio has been criticized for endorsing pseudoscience, spreading misinformation, and trivializing real world atrocities.

In a 2008 episode of the show, an image of a fake newspaper article from the satirical news website The Onion parodying the Stock Market, was depicted as a legitimate article from 1929.
