= List of programs broadcast by Antena 3 =

This is a list of programs currently, formerly, and soon to be broadcast on Antena 3, in Spain.

Original Title	Years	Genre	Performers / hosts
1 contra 100	2006–2007	Quiz show	Juan y Medio
El 1%	2024-	Quiz show	Arturo Valls
18	2008–2009	Drama	Hugo Rosales
3D	2010–2011	Variety	Gloria Serra
360 grados	2007–2008	Talk show	Roberto Arce
700 euros, diario secreto de una call girl	2008	Drama	Mercè Llorens
7 días, 7 noches	2003–2007, 2011	Documentary	Pedro Piqueras, Juan Ramón Lucas, Teresa Viejo and Gloria Serra
90-60-90, diario secreto de una adolescente	2009	Drama	Jesús Olmedo
A 3 bandas	2007–2008	Variety	Jaime Cantizano, Jesús Mariñas and María Patiño
¡A bailar!	2014	Talent show	Mónica Naranjo
A fondo: Zona cero	2009–2010		
A la carta	2004	Variety	Agustín Bravo
A medias	2002	Sitcom	Nancho Novo and Iñaki Miramón
A plena luz	2002	Variety	Pedro Piqueras
A quién se le ocurre	1995	Comedy	Pepe Carrol
A toda página	1994–1997	Variety	Marta Robles
A tortas con la vida	2005–2006	Sitcom	Armando del Río
Abierto 24 horas	2000–2001	Sitcom	Pilar Bardem and Luis Merlo
Abierto al anochecer	2002		Jordi González
Ada Madrina	1999	Sitcom	Carmen Sevilla and Jesús Puente
Adolfo Suárez, el presidente	2010	Drama	Ginés García Millán
Ahora	2000–2006	News	Cristina Saavedra
¡Ahora caigo!	2011–2021	Quiz show	Arturo Valls
Al ataque	1992–1993	Comedy	Alfonso Arús
Al descubierto	2001		Santiago Acosta
Al filo de la ley	1993	News	Rosa María Mateo
Al pie de la letra	2007–2008	Talent show	Javier Estrada
Al rincón de pensar	2015	Talk show	Risto Mejide
Algo que celebrar	2015	Sitcom	Luis Varela
Allí abajo	2015-2019	Sitcom	María León and Jon Plazaola
Alta tensión	1998–2000	Game show	Constantino Romero
Amar es para siempre	2013–2024	Soap opera	Marc Clotet
El Amor está en el aire	2016	Dating Show	Juan y Medio
Ambiciones	1998	Soap opera	Manuel Galiana
Antena 3 Noticias	1990–	News	Matías Prats, Vicente Vallés, Mónica Carrillo, Esther Vaquero, Sandra Golpe
Antivicio	2000	Drama Series	Armando del Río
Apaches	2018	Drama Series	Alberto Ammann
Aquí mando yo	2016	Reality Show	Miki Nadal
Aquí no hay quien viva	2003–2006	Sitcom	José Luis Gil, Fernando Tejero and María Adánez
El árbol de tu vida	2017	Variety Show	Toñi Moreno
Arena Mix	2009		
Arena Mix Internacional	2010		
Arévalo y cía	1994–1999	Comedy	Arévalo
Art Attack	2005–2009	Children	Jordi Cruz
Atrapa un millón	2011–2014	Quiz Show	Carlos Sobera
Audiencia pública	2000		Ricardo Fernández Deu and Javier Nart
El Auténtico Rodrigo Leal	2005	Soap Opera	Iván Sánchez
Avanti ¡que pase el siguiente!	2012	Quiz show	Carlos Sobera and Angy Fernández
¡Ay, Señor, Señor!	1994–1995	Sitcom	Andrés Pajares
Bajo sospecha	2015–2016	Drama series	Yon González
Bandolera	2011–2012	Soap opera	Marta Hazas
El Barco	2011–2013	Drama	Juanjo Artero, Mario Casas and Blanca Suárez
El Barco: rumbo a lo desconocido	2011	Reality show	
Barras	2008		Óscar Terol
The Barrier	2020	Drama Series	Unax Ugalde y Olivia Molina
Bienvenidos al Lolita	2014	Quiz show	Beatriz Carvajal and Natalia Verbeke
¡Boom!	2014–2022	Quiz show	Juanra Bonet
La Botica de Txumari	2000		Txumari Alfaro
La Buena onda de la tarde	2005		Alicia Senovilla
Buenafuente	2005–2007		Andreu Buenafuente
Buenas noches y Buenafuente	2012		Andreu Buenafuente
El bus	2000	Reality Show	Inés Ballester and Liborio García
Buscando el norte	2016	Sitcom	Belén Cuesta
C.L.A. No somos ángeles	2007	Drama Series	Mariano Alameda
Cada día	2004–2005	Variety Show	María Teresa Campos
Cafetería Manhattan	2007	Sitcom	Santi Rodríguez
Cámara baja	1993	Talk Show	Consuelo Berlanga
Cambio de rumbo	2009		
Camera Kids	2013		Jandro
Cambio radical	2007	Reality show	Teresa Viejo
Canciones de nuestra vida	1997	Music	Francis Lorenzo
Canguros	1994–1996	Sitcom	Maribel Verdú and Ana Risueño
¿Cantas o qué?	2006	Talent Show	Paula Vázquez
El capitán en América	2025	Reality Show	Joaquín Sánchez
La Cara divertida	1997–1998, 2010–)	Humour	Bertín Osborne and Francis Lorenzo
Carandelario	1990		Luis Carandell
Las Caras del crimen	2002	Reality Show	Sonsoles Suárez
La casa de los líos	1996–2000	Sitcom	Arturo Fernández
La casa de papel	2017	Drama Series	Úrsula Corberó
Casados a primera vista	2015-2018	Dating show	Arantxa Coca
Casi perfectos	2004–2005	Sitcom	Emilio Aragón
El Castillo de las mentes prodigiosas	2004		Alicia Senovilla
La catedral del mar	2018	Drama Series	Aitor Luna and Michelle Jenner
La Central	2000	Late Night	Jesús Vázquez
La chica de Ayer	2009		Ernesto Alterio and Antonio Garrido
El Chou	1994		Alfonso Arús
Un Chupete para ella	2000–2002		Juanjo Puigcorbé
Los Cinco sentidos	1993		Paloma Lago
El círculo de los famosos	2023	Quiz Show	Juanra Bonet
Círculo rojo	2007	Drama	María Adánez
Cita con la vida	1993–1996	Talk show	Nieves Herrero
Ciudad Sur	2001	Soap Opera	Jaime Blanch
Ciudadanos	2013	Talk show	Julia Otero
La Clave	1990–1991	Talk show	José Luis Balbín
El Club de la comedia	1999–2005	Comedy	Emilio Aragón
El Club del Chiste	2010–2013	Comedy	Anabel Alonso
Club Megatrix	1995–2013	Children	Ana Chávarri, Daniel Diges, Enric Escudé
Código fuego	2003	Drama	José Coronado and Maribel Verdú
Como la vida	1999–2004	Talk show	Alicia Senovilla
Como la vida misma	1992	Sitcom	Verónica Forqué
Compañeros	1998–2002	Drama Series	Francis Lorenzo, Miguel Rellán and Beatriz Carvajal
Compuesta y sin novio	1994		Lina Morgan
Los Comunes	1999		Jesús Hermida
Con el culo al aire	2012–2014		Paco Tous and Toni Acosta
Con luz propia	1995		Candela Palazón
Con ustedes... Pedro Ruiz	1992–1993		Pedro Ruiz
Condenadas an entenderse	1999		Anabel Alonso
Confesiones	1994–1995		Carlos Carnicero
Confianza ciega	2002		Juan Ramón Lucas and Francine Gálvez
Confidencial S.A.	2007	Documentary	Santiago Acosta
El contenedor	2019	Docu-Reality	
Contigo al fin del mundo	2017	Dating show	Julian Iantzi
Contraportada	1998		Marta Robles
The Cook of Castamar	2021	Drama Series	Michelle Jenner
Coplas de verano	1996	Music	Bibiana Fernández
El Coraje de vivir	1994	Docu drama	Lola Flores
El corazón del océano	2014	Drama	Hugo Silva
Cristina, amiga mía	1999		Cristina Tárrega
El Cronómetro	1999–2000		Concha Galán
Cuéntame un cuento	2014	Mini-series	Arturo Valls
Cuerda de presos	1996		Jesús Quintero
Cuerpo de élite	2018	Sitcom	Cristina Castaño
Cuestión de peso	2009		Cristina Lasvignes
Curso del 63	2009		
Dando la nota	2012		Jaime Cantizano
De buena mañana	2001–2002		Juan Ramón Lucas and Isabel Gemio
¿De qué hablan las mujeres?	2000		Jesús Vázquez
De tres en tres	1998		Goyo González
De tú a tú	1990–1993	Talk Show	Nieves Herrero
De vez en cuando la vida	2005		Silvia Jato
Decídete	2009		Susana Molina
Decogarden	2010–2011	Variety	Yolanda Alzola
Decora	2009		Eva Armenteros
Desesperado Club Social	1999–2002	Children	Christian Gálvez and Kira Miró
El desafío	2021-	Talent Show	Roberto Leal
El Destape	2007		Guillermo Martín
La Diana	2014	Investigative	Gloria Serra
El Diario	2008–2011	Talk show	Sandra Daviú
El Diario de Patricia	2001–2008	Talk show	Patricia Gaztañaga
Diario y medio	2007	Talk show	Juan y Medio
Diario de una boda	2004		Jaime Cantizano
Dime que me quieres	2001		Imanol Arias and Lydia Bosch
Distracción fatal	2007	Quiz show	Anabel Alonso
Divinos	2006		Santi Millán and Paula Vázquez
Dobles parejas	1996		Santiago Segura
Doctor Mateo	2009–2011		Gonzalo de Castro
Domingo en rojo	1990		Lydia Bosch
Los Domingos por Norma	1992–1993		Norma Duval
¿Dónde estás, corazón?	2003–2011	Talk Show	Jaime Cantizano
Efecto F	1997		Francis Lorenzo
Ellas y el sexo débil	2006	Sitcom	Ana Obregón
Ell@s	2009		Nuria Gago
La embajada	2016	Drama Series	Belén Rueda
En antena	1997–1998	Talk Skow	Inés Ballester
En antena	2006	Variety Show	Jaime Cantizano
En buenas manos	1994–2005	Health	Bartolomé Beltrán
En la frontera de la realidad	2003		Mon Santiso
En plena forma	1997	Sitcom	Alfredo Landa and Concha Cuetos
En tierra hostil	2015	Documentary	Alejandra Andrade
Encantada de la vida	1993–1994	Talk Show	Concha Velasco
Encantados de conocerte	1992	Talk Show	Carmen Maura
La encrucujada	2025-2026	Soap Opera	Rodrigo Guirao
Equipo de investigación	2011–2013	Reality show	Gloria Serra
El Equipo G	2004–2005		Erik Putzbach
¡Eres un artista!	1999–2004	Comedy	Alfons Arús
La Escobilla nacional	2010	Comedy	Àngel Llàcer
Espejo público	1996–	Variety Show	Pedro Piqueras, Sonsoles Suárez and Susanna Griso
Esta casa era una ruina	2007–2010	Reality show	Jorge Fernández
Esta noche, sexo	1995		Isabel Gemio
Estamos todos locos	1994		Pepe Navarro
Éste es mi barrio	1996–1997		José Sacristán
Esto me suena	1999		Rody Aragón
Esto no es serio	2001	Comedy	Antonio Hidalgo
Esto se anima	1993	Variety Show	Irma Soriano
Estoy por ti	2005–2006	Dating Show	Anabel Alonso and Michel Brown
Estudio de actores	2002	Talent Sow	Juan Ramón Lucas
Eva y Kolegas	2008		Ana García de Ceca
El tiempo entre costuras	2013–2014		Adriana Ugarte and Ana Milán
Extra Rosa	1997		Ana Rosa Quintana and Rosa Villacastín
Factor miedo	2004		Alonso Caparrós
La familia Mata	2007–2009	Sitcom	Daniel Guzmán and Elena Ballesteros
Family Feud: La batalla de los famosos	2021	Quiz show	Nuria Roca
Fariña	2018	Drama Series	Javier Rey
Farmacia de guardia	1991–1995	Sitcom	Concha Cuetos and Carlos Larrañaga
Fenómenos	2012–2013	Sitcom	Ana Polvorosa
Fichados	2008	Entertainment	
FIFA World Cup	2002	Sport	
Física o Química	2008–2011		Ana Milán, Cristina Alcázar and Maxi Iglesias
Fugitivos en la ciudad	2000		Alonso Caparrós
Furor	1998–2001		Alonso Caparrós
Futuro: 48 horas	2008		Andoni Gracia
Gavilanes	2010–2011	Soap opera	Rodolfo Sancho and Claudia Bassols
Genio y figura	1994–1995		Pepe Carrol
El Gordo	1990–1992		José Coronado and Irma Soriano
Gran Hotel	2011–2013	Drama	Amaia Salamanca and Yon González
El Gran Juego de la Oca	1993–1995		Emilio Aragón and Pepe Navarro
La Gran opportunidad	2009		Luis Larrodera
El Gran test	2002–2003		Paula Vázquez and Manu Carreño
La Granja	2004–2005		Terelu Campos
La guardería	1990–1993		Teresa Rabal
Háblame de ti	2004		Agustín Bravo
Hablando en plata	2023	Documentary	Alberto Chicote and Sonsoles Ónega
Hay una carta para ti	2002–2004	Reality Show	Isabel Gemio
¿Hay trato?	2004	Quiz Show	Carlos Sobera
Hermanos de leche	1994–1995	Sitcom	José Coronado, Juan Echanove and El Gran Wyoming
Hermida y Cía	1993–1996	Talk Show	Jesús Hermida
Hispania	2010–2012	Drama Series	Roberto Enríquez and Ana de Armas
Los hombres de Paco	2005–2010	Drama Series	Paco Tous
Homo Zapping	2003–2007	Comedy	José Corbacho
La Hora de la verdad	2004–2007		Alicia Senovilla and José Ángel Ponsoda
La Hora H	1996–1997	Talk Show	Jesús Hermida
Hospital	1996		Mercedes Sampietro
Hoy de mañana	1998		Ely del Valle
Hoy por ti	1996		Isabel Gemio
Im presionante	1998		Goyo González
Impacto total	2007	Videos	Ximo Rovira
Impacto TV	1997–1998		Carlos García Hirschfeld
Impares	2008	Sitcom	
Impares Premium	2010–2011	Sitcom	
Imperium	2012	Drama Series	Pepe Sancho
El incidente	2017	Drama Series	Marta Etura
Informe 3	2010–2011		Jaime Cantizano
El Hormiguero	2011–		Pablo Motos
Improvisando	2020	Comedy	Arturo Valls
Increíbles. El gran desafío	2013		Carlos Sobera and Berta Collado
El Inquilino	2004	Sitcom	Jorge Sanz
Intercambio consentido	2018	Docu-Reality	
El Internado	2007–2010	Drama Series	Luis Merlo and Elena Furiase
Invisibles	2010		Sofía Mazagatos
La isla de los famosos	2003–2005	Reality Show	Paula Vázquez and Nuria Roca
Jackie y su mascota	1995	Animation, children	
La Jaula	2010		Anna Simón
El Jefe	2011	Reality show	
J.M. presenta	1990	Talk show	Juanjo Menéndez
Jeopardy!	2007	Quiz show	Carlos Sobera
Joaquín, el novato	2022-	Talk Show	Joaquín Sánchez
Juego de juegos!	2019	Quiz show	Silvia Abril
Juego de pelotas	2025-	Quiz show	Juanra Bonet
El juego de los anillos!	2019	Quiz show	Jorge Fernández
El Kanguro de A3Z	1997–1999		
Karabudjan	2010		Hugo Silva
Karlos Arguiñano en tu cocina	2010–		Karlos Arguiñano
Ládrame mucho	2009		
La Liga	2017	Sport	
Los ladrones van a la oficina	1993–1995		Fernando Fernán Gómez and José Luis López Vázquez
Lalola	2008–2009		Marina Gatell
LEGO Masters España	2021	Game show	Roberto Leal
Leña al mono que es de goma	1993–1994		Tony Aguilar and Melanie Olivares
LEX	2008		Javier Cámara
Libertad vigilada	2006		Antonia Moreno
Lies and Deceit	2022	Serie dramática	Javier Rey.
Llama y gana	2003		Mar Saura
Lleno, por favor	1993		Alfredo Landa
Lluvia de estrellas	1995–2001		Bertín Osborne
Lo que inTeresa	2006		María Teresa Campos
Lo que necesitas es amor	1993–1999		Isabel Gemio, Jesús Puente and Pedro Rollán
Lobos	2005		Sancho Gracia
Locos por la tele	2007–2010		Mónica Martínez
London Street	2003		Fernando Ramallo
El Lugar del crimen	2002–2003		Mon Santiso
Un Lugar en el mundo	2003		Ginés García Millán
Luna, el misterio de Calenda	2012–2013		Belén Rueda and Olivia Molina
Maldita la hora	2001		Máximo Pradera
Mamá quiere ser artista	1997		Concha Velasco
Maneras de vivir	2010–2012		
Manolito Gafotas	2004		Adriana Ozores
Manolo y Benito Corporeision	2006–2007		Carlos Iglesias and Ángel de Andrés López
Manos a la obra	1998–2001		Carlos Iglesias and Ángel de Andrés López
Las Mañanas de Rosa	1999		Rosa Villacastín
Mar de plástico	2015–2016	Drama series	Rodolfo Sancho
El Marco	2010		Patricia Gaztañaga
Marco, la historia de un niño	2011–2012		Sergi Méndez, Juan y Raúl del Pozo and Carla Díaz
El marqués de Sotoancho	2000		Josema Yuste
Los Más	2004–2006		Silvia Jato and Paula Vázquez
Los Más buscados	2007	Reality show	Albert Castillón
López y leal contra el canal	2024	Game Show	Roberto Leal and Iñaki López
Más que palabras	1995	Talk show	Mercedes Milá
Mask Singer: Adivina quién canta	2020-	Music	Arturo Valls
Masters de la reforma	2019	Talent show	Manel Fuentes
Matadero	2019	Drama series	Pepe Viyuela
Los Mayores gamberros	2013-	Comedy	Alfredo Leal
Mayores sin reparos	1997	Talk show	Tico Medina
Me cambio de década	2017	Docu-reality	Arturo Valls
Me resbala	2013–2021	Comedy	Arturo Valls
Menta y chocolate	2003	Talking show	Patricia Gaztañaga
Un Menú de 7 estrellas	1998	Cooking show	Agustín Bravo
Menudas estrellas	1996–2002	Talent show	Bertín Osborne
Menudo Show	1995–1996		Diana Lázaro
Menudo es mi padre	1996–1998	Sitcom	El Fary
La merienda	1990–1994	Children	Miliki, Rita Irasema and Ana Chávarri
El Método Gonzo	2008	Magazine	Fernando González
El método por dos	2008	Magazine	Silvia Salgado
Mira quien viene esta noche	1997		Paula Vázquez
Mira tú por dónde	2002–2003		Paula Vázquez and Liborio García
Mírame	1999–2001		Silvia Jato and Mar Saura
Mirando al mar	2004		Cristina Tárrega
Mire usté	2005		
Mis adorables vecinos	2004–2006		Paz Padilla and Miriam Díaz-Aroca
Mucho que perder, nada que ganar	2011		Anabel Alonso
Mundo Brasero	2022	Variety Show	Roberto Brasero
Nada es para siempre	1999–2000		Carlos Castel
Ninja Warrior	2017	Variety Show	Arturo Valls
No es programa para viejos	2008		Patricia Gaztañaga
No te olvides el cepillo de dientes	1995		Àlex Casanovas and Paula Vázquez
La noche de Hermida	1992–1993		Jesús Hermida
Noche de impacto	1998–2005		Carlos García Hirschfeld and Liborio García
Noche de lobos	1990–1992		Juan Luis Goas
La noche de Rober	2018	Comedy	Roberto Vilar
Noche Mix	2009		
La Noche de los errores	2000–2002		Josema Yuste
Noche, noche	1993		Emilio Aragón
La Noche prohibida	1996		José Coronado, Yvonne Reyes and Enrique del Pozo
Noche y día	2001		Isabel Gemio
El número uno	2012–2013		Paula Vázquez
Números Locos	2005		Carlos Sobera
Operación Momotombo	2010		Julio Salinas
Osados	1997		Manuel Giménez and Ramón Arangüena
Otra dimensión	2001		Mon Santiso
Padre coraje	2002		Juan Diego
Padres	2009–2010		Lola Marceli
Un País de locos	1990	Variety	Alfredo Amestoy and José Antonio Plaza
Un País maravilloso	1999	Variety	Anabel Alonso
Pánico en el plató	2009–2010	Talk show	Juan y Medio and Luis Larrodera
El Pantano	2003	Drama	Emma Suárez
Papá	2001		Mónica Molina
Papá Piernas largas	1995	Animation, children	
Para toda la vida	1999		Pedro Rollán
Paranoia semanal	2007	Comedy	Juan y Medio
La parodia nacional	1996–2002		Constantino Romero
Pasapalabra	2000–2006, 2021-		Silvia Jato and Roberto Leal
Un Paso adelante	2002–2005		Miguel Ángel Muñoz, Pablo Puyol and Beatriz Luengo
El Patito feo	2000	Reality show	Ana Obregón
Pelopicopata	2004–2006	Variety	Silvia Jato, Jaime Bores and Anabel Alonso
Pelotas fuera	1996	Sports	Raquel Meroño
Pequeñas coincidencias	2019–2021	Sitcom	Marta Hazas and Javier Veiga
Peta-Zetas	2008	Comedy	José Corbacho
La Picota del mundo	1990	News	Pedro J. Ramírez
Póker de damas	1999	Talk show	Cristina Tárrega
Policías, en el corazón de la calle	2000–2003	Drama series	José María Pou
Polvo de estrellas	1990–1991	Movies	Carlos Pumares
Por el mundo a los 80	2019	Docu-reality	Arturo Valls
Por fin solos	1995	Sitcom	Alfredo Landa and María José Alfonso
Por la escuadra	1999	Sports	Carlos García Hirschfeld
Por arte de magia	2013	Variety	Anna Simón
El precio justo	2006–2007	Game Show	Juan y Medio
Presunto culpable	2018	Drama Series	Miguel Ángel Muñoz
El primer café	1996–2003	News	Antonio San José, Isabel San Sebastián and Carmen Gurruchaga
Los protegidos	2010–2012	Drama Series	Antonio Garrido, Angie Cepeda and Marta Torné
Pulsaciones	2017	Drama Series	Leonor Watling
PuntoDoc	2007	Documentary	Luján Argüelles, Raúl Peña, Pepón Nieto and Tristán Ulloa
Quart	2007	Drama series	Roberto Enríquez
Qué loca peluquería	1995	Sitcom	Mónica Randall
Qué memoria la mía	1996		Marta Robles
Queremos saber	1992–1993	Talk show	Mercedes Milá
Queremos saber más	2002		Mercedes Milá
Querida familia	1995		Cristina Caras Lindas
Los Quién	2011		Javier Cámara and María Pujalte
¿Quién da la vez?	1995		José Sacristán
¿Quién dijo miedo?	2000		Alonso Caparrós
¿Quién quiere ser millonario?	2005–2008		Carlos Sobera
Quiéreme mucho	1992		Miguel Ortiz
Quiero cantar	2010		Jorge Fernández
El Rastrillo	1995		Agustín Bravo and Paula Vázquez
El Rayo	2000		Inma del Moral
Refrescante 95	1995		Irma Soriano
La Reina del Sur	2011		Kate del Castillo
Rescatando a Sara	2014	Mini-series	Carmen Machi
La respuesta	2003–2004		Javier González Ferrari, Pedro Piqueras and Roberto Arce
Rico al instante	2009–2011		Javier Estrada, Ramón García and Carlos Lozano
Ricos y famosos	1990–1991		Lola Forner
Ruedo ibérico	2004–2006		Montserrat Domínguez
La ruleta de la fortuna	1990–1992		Mayra Gómez Kemp, Ramón García, Irma Soriano, Bigote Arrocet, Mabel Lozano and Belén Rueda
La Ruleta de la Suerte	2006–		Jorge Fernández
Rumore, rumore	2001		Víctor Sandoval and Francine Gálvez
¿Sabes más que un niño de primaria?	2007–2008	Concurso	Ramón García
Splash: famosos al agua	2013	Talent Show	Arturo Valls
Sabor a Lolas	1992–1993	Talk Show	Lola Flores and Lolita Flores
Sabor a ti	1998–2004	Variety Show	Ana Rosa Quintana
Sabor a verano	1999	Variety Show	Inés Ballester
Salta!	2025-	Game Show	Manel Fuentes
Casados a primera vista	2015-	Dating show	Arantxa Coca
Se busca	1995–1996		José Antonio Gavira
El Secreto	2009		
El secreto de Puente Viejo	2011–2020		María Bouzas and Megan Montaner
La Senda	1994		José Luis Balbín
El Show de los récords	2001–2002		Manu Carreño and Mar Saura
Showmatch	2000		Antonio Hidalgo
Si yo fuera tú	2007	Interviews	Aitor Trigos
Simplemente Mayra	1990		Mayra Gómez Kemp
Sin identidad	2014	Drama	Megan Montaner
Sin límites	1998		Jesús Hermida and Mercedes Milá
Sinceramente Ana Rosa Quintana	1997		Ana Rosa Quintana
El Síndrome de Ulises	2007–2008		Miguel Ángel Muñoz
Situación de emergencia	1997–1998		Roberto Arce
Somos cómplices	2009		Cristina Peña
La sonrisa del pelícano	1997		Pepe Navarro
Sonrisas de España	1996		José Luis Coll and Paula Vázquez
Sonrisas y lágrimas	1994	Animation, children	
La sopa boba	2004		Lolita Flores
Sorpresa, ¡Sorpresa!	1996–1999		Isabel Gemio and Concha Velasco
Soy El Solitario	2008		Pepo Oliva
Stolen Away	2020	Drama Series	Melanie Olivares
Sueños en Libertad	2024-	Soap Opera	Natalia Sánchez
El Superjuego	1992–1993	Game Show	Diana Lázaro
El Supershow	2004	Game Show	Carlos Sobera and Patricia Pérez
Ta tocao	1994–1995	Game Show	Belén Rueda, Yvonne Reyes and Miguel Ortiz
Tal cual lo contamos	2008–2010		Cristina Lasvignes
Tal para cual	2006	Game Show	Anabel Alonso
Tan contentos	1991–1992	Variety Show	Consuelo Berlanga
La Tarántula	1990	Talk Show	Antonio Herrero
Te lo mereces	2012		Paula Vázquez
Telemaratón	1993–2001		Emilio Aragón
El Tercero en discordia	2011		Carlos Sobera
La Tertulia	1990	Talk Show	Miguel Ángel García Juez
The Floor	2023	Game Show	Manel Fuentes
Tiempos de guerra	2017	Drama Series	Amaia Salamanca
Todo por la pasta	1993	Game Show	Sancho Gracia
Todo va bien	1993–1994	Variety Show	Pepe Navarro
Todos a bordo	1995	Sitcom	Juan Luis Galiardo
Todos somos humanos	1996	Comedy	Javier Sardà and José María Carrascal
Toledo	2012	Drama Series	Juan Diego and Maxi Iglesias
Top Chef	2013–2017	Cooking	Alberto Chicote
Tomates y pimientos	1999	Cooking	Mayra Gómez Kemp
Top Dance	2016	Talent Show	Manuel Fuentes
Toy Boy	2019	Drama Series	Cristina Castaño
Tras 3 tris	1994	Children	Ana Chávarri, Fofito and Rody Aragón
Trato hecho	1999–2002	Quiz Show	Bertín Osborne
Los Tres de Antena 3	1991		José María Carrascal, Fernando González Urbaneja and Luis Herrero
Tres deseos	2008		Jaime Cantizano
Tres hijos para mí solo	1995		Enrique Simón
La Trituradora	1999		Belinda Washington
Tu cara me suena	2011–	Talent Show	Manel Fuentes
Tu cara no me suena todavía	2017	Talent Show	Manel Fuentes
El turista habitual	1993		Jordi González
UAP: Unidad de Análisis Policial	2014	Investigative	Carolina Sellés
UEFA Champions League	2018	Sport	
UEFA Europa League	2018	Sport	
UHF	2004		Florentino Fernández
Los Últimos 20 metros	2009	Game Show	Óscar Martínez
Unan1mous	2007	Reality show	Ximo Rovira
¡Usted Perdone!	2012	Variety Show	Javier Sardà
Vaya fauna	1992–1993	Variety Show	Chari Gómez Miranda and Enrique Simón
Vaya par	2009	Variety Show	María Patiño, Jesús Mariñas and Julian Iantzi
Velvet	2014–2016	Drama	Paula Echevarría and Miguel Ángel Silvestre
Ven a cenar conmigo	2008	Cooking Show	
Veneno	2020	Drama Series	Daniela Santiago and Isabel Torres
Veo cómo cantas	2021–2022	Talent show	Manel Fuentes
Ver para creer	1999–2000	Variety Show	Inés Ballester and Liborio García
Verano 3	2003	Variety Show	Andoni Ferreño
Verano de campeones	2009	Game Show	Aitor Trigos
Verano noche	2002	Variety Show	Bertín Osborne and Mar Saura
Una vida bárbara	2023	Documentary	Bárbara Rey
La Vida es rosa	2005	Variety Show	Rosa Villacastín
Vidas marcadas	2009	Reality Show	
Videos, videos	2001–2002, 2010	Videos	
Los Viernes al show	2014	Comedy	Manel Fuentes and Arturo Valls
Los Vigilantes de la tele	2002	Variety Show	Manu Carreño
Vis a vis	2015-2016	Drama series	Maggie Civantos
Viva la vida	1991–1993	Variety Show	Bartolomé Beltrán
Vive cantando	2013–2014	Comedy	Maria Castro
Vivir, vivir... que bonito	1992–1993	Variety Show	Pepe Navarro
La voz	2019-	Talent show	Eva González
La Voz Kids	2019-	Talent-Show	Eva González
La Voz Senior	2019-2022	Talent-Show	Eva González
La vuelta al mundo en directo	2009	Game show	Óscar Martínez
Web te ve	2000	Variety Show	Lucía Riaño
X ti	2003	Variety Show	Paula Vázquez and Antonio Hidalgo
Y ahora Encarna	1990–1991	Variety Show	Encarna Sánchez
Y ahora Sonsoles	2022-	Variety Show	Sonsoles Ónega.
¡Ya es viernes!... ¿O no?	2003	Comedy	Javier Capitán
Yo, una mujer	1996	Drama series	Concha Velasco
