= 2004 in Spanish television =

This is a list of Spanish television related events in 2004.

== Events ==
- 11 March: News programs in every channel covering the 2004 Madrid train bombings.
- 23 April: Carmen Caffarel is appointed General Director of RTVE.
- 27 April: Fran Llorente is appointed News Service Director of TVE, replacing Alfredo Urdaci.
- 22 May: Broadcasting of the Prince Felipe and Letizia Ortiz wedding with more tan 25 million viewers.
- 24 June: Telecinco puts on the Stock Exchange 34.59% of its share.
- 20 November: María Isabel, wins the Junior Eurovision Song Contest 2004 with the song Antes muerta que sencilla.
- 9 December: The Self-Regulation Code on Television Content and Children is signed.

== Debuts ==
Title	Channel	Debut	Performers/Host	Genre
59 segundos	TVE-1	2004-10-04	Mamen Mendizábal	Talking Show
A la carta	Antena 3	2004-07-19	Agustín Bravo	Variety Show
¡Allá tú!	Telecinco	2004-01-26	Jesús Vázquez	Quiz Show
Atlantia	TVE-1	2004-02-08	Manuel Toharia	Documentary
Birlokus klub	Telecinco	2004-10-16		Children
Cada día	Antena 3	2004-09-09	María Teresa Campos	Variety Show
Cara a cara	Canal +	2004-09-01	Antonio San José	Talk Show
Carta de ajuste	TVE-1	2004-05-17	José María Íñigo	Variety Show
Casi perfectos	Antena 3	2004-01-29	Emilio Aragón	Sitcom
Código cine	Canal +	2004-09-09	Juan Zavala	Movies
Crónicas	La 2	2004-10-11	Elena Sánchez	News Magazine
Cuadernos de paso	La 2	2004-04-25	Juan Manuel Blázquez	Documentary
De cerca	La 2	2004-09-26	Baltasar Magro	Talk Show
Sport.es	TVE-1	2004-02-02	Pedro Barthe	Sport
Diario de	Telecinco	2004-05-31	Mercedes Milá	Investigation
Diario de la noche	Telemadrid	2004-09-13	Germán Yanke	News
Diario de una boda	Antena 3	2004-02-11	Jaime Cantizano	Magazine
Diez en Ibiza	TVE-1	2004-05-31	Ángel de Andrés	Drama Series
Dinamita	Telecinco	2004-08-01	El Tricicle	Sitcom
Dos rombos	TVE-1	2004-09-16	Lorena Berdún	Science/Culture
El castillo de las mentes prodigiosas	Antena 3	2004-03-23	Alicia Senovilla	Reality Show
El Equipo G	Antena 3	2004-12-12	Erik Putzbach	Reality Show
El humor de tu vida	TVE-1	2004-11-05	Las Veneno	Comedy
El Inquilino	Antena 3	2004-09-05	Jorge Sanz	Sitcom
El mundo mágico de Brunelesky	Telecinco	2004-01-03	Agustín Galiana	Children
El Supershow	Antena 3	2004-07-22	Carlos Sobera	Variety Show
El verano de tu vida	TVE-1	2004-07-31	Carlos Lozano	Variety Show
Enfoque	La 2	2004-10-05	Pedro Piqueras	News Magazine
Esto es vida	TVE-1	2004-09-28	Juan Ramón Lucas	Variety Show
Estravagario	La 2	2004-10-01	Javier Rioyo	Science/Culture
Eurodebate	La 2	2004-12-18	Daniel Domenjó	Talking Show
Factor miedo	Antena 3	2004-03-07	Alonso Caparrós	Quiz Show
Fórmula 1	Telecinco	2004-03-07	Antonio Lobato	Sport
Gran Hermano VIP	Telecinco	2004-01-22	Jesús Vázquez	Reality Show
Háblame de ti	Antena 3	2004-01-07	Agustín Bravo	Talk Show
¿Hay trato?	Antena 3	2004-01-14	Carlos Sobera	Quiz Show
Hazme reír	Antena 3	2004-01-30	Vanesa Cabeza	Comedy
Juan y José show	TVE-1	2004-10-10	Cruz y Raya	Comedy
Karlos Arguiñano en tu cocina	Telecinco	2004-09-08	Karlos Arguiñano	Cooking Show
Kombai & Co.	Telecinco	2004-01-07	Carlos Castel	Youth
La casa de tu vida	Telecinco	2004-04-14	Jordi González	Reality Show
La Granja	Antena 3	2004-09-08	Terelu Campos	Reality Show
La hora de la verdad	Antena 3	2004-07-13	Alicia Senovilla	Reality Show
La hora wiki	Canal +	2004-09-06	Raquel Sánchez-Silva	Youth
La sopa boba	Antena 3	2004-05-24	María Barranco	Sitcom
Las cerezas	TVE-1	2004-10-26	Julia Otero	Talk Show
Latrelevisión	Telecinco	2004-02-01	Carlos Latre	Comedy
Lo que me contaron los muertos	TVE-1	2004-07-14	Manuel Giménez	News Magazine
Los 80	Telecinco	2004-09-29	José Coronado	Drama Series
Los Más	Antena 3	2004-08-01	Silvia Jato	Videos
Manolito Gafotas	Antena 3	2004-01-04	Adriana Ozores	Sitcom
Memoria de España	TVE-1	2004-02-03	Fernando García de Cortázar	Documentary
Metro a Metro	Telemadrid	2004-09-13	Javier Capitán	Quiz Show
Miradas 2	La 2	2004-10-04	Georgina Cisquella	Science/Culture
Mirando al mar	Antena 3	2004-07-05	Cristina Tárrega	Variety Show
Mis adorables vecinos	Antena 3	2004-04-11	Paz Padilla	Sitcom
Muchoviaje	TVE-1	2004-06-27	Arantxa Sánchez	Science/Culture
Música uno	TVE-1	2004-03-20	Elsa Pinilla	Música
No es lo mismo	Telecinco	2004-02-28	Olga Viza	Talk Show
Nuestra mejor canción	TVE-1	2004-11-29	Concha García Campoy	Música
Off Moviesma	La 2	2004-09-23	Antonio Gasset	Movies
Paco y Veva	TVE-1	2004-01-08	Hugo Silva	Sitcom
Pelopicopata	Antena 3	2004-06-19	Silvia Jato	Quiz Show
Ruedo Ibérico	Antena 3	2004-09-06	Montserrat Domínguez	Talk Show
¿Se puede?	TVE-1	2004-07-03	Lina Morgan	Sitcom
TNT	Telecinco	2004-07-19	Jordi González	Late Night
TV On Enchufados	Antena 3	2004-06-24		Videos
TV Top	Telecinco	2004-05-02		Videos
U-24	Telecinco	2004-11-01		Docudrama
UHF	Antena 3	2004-03-24	Florentino Fernández	Comedy
Un paseo por la naturaleza	La 2	2004-03-02		Science/Culture
Voluntarios	La 2	2004-07-07	Francine Gálvez	Public Service
VYV teleadictos	Telecinco	2004-07-26		Videos

== Television shows ==
- La 1
  - Telediario (1957– )
  - Estudio estadio (1972–2005)
  - Informe Semanal (1973– )
  - Parlamento (1978–2014)
  - Telepasión española (1990– )
  - Corazón, Corazón (1993–2010)
  - Cartelera (1994–2009)
  - Los Desayunos de TVE (1994–2020)
  - Cine de barrio (1995– )
  - El Grand Prix del verano (1995–2005)
  - Gente (1995–2011)
  - Corazón (1997– )
  - Saber vivir (1997–2009)
  - El Conciertazo (2000–2009)
  - Cuéntame cómo pasó (2001– )
  - Ana y los siete (2002–2005)
  - Por la mañana (2002–2008)
- Antena 3
  - Antena 3 Noticias (1990– )
  - En buenas manos (1994–2005)
  - Club Megatrix (1995–2013)
  - Espejo público (1996– )
  - Noche de impacto (1998–2005)
  - El club de la comedia (1999–2005)
  - Ahora (2000–2006)
  - Pasapalabra (2000–2006)
  - El Diario de Patricia (2001–2008)
  - Un paso adelante (2002–2005)
  - La Isla de los FamoS.O.S. (2003–2005)
  - Aquí no hay quien viva (2003–2006)
  - Homo Zapping (2003–2007)
  - 7 días, 7 noches (2003–2007)
  - ¿Dónde estás, corazón? (2003–2011)
- La 2
  - Al filo de lo imposble (1982– )
  - Pueblo de Dios (1982– )
  - Últimas preguntas (1983– )
  - En portada (1984– )
  - Estadio 2 (1984–2007)
  - Metrópolis (1985– )
  - Documentos TV (1986– )
  - Tendido cero (1986– )
  - Días de cine (1991– )
  - Línea 900 (1991–2007)
  - La Aventura del saber (1992– )
  - Jara y sedal (1992– )
  - Zona ACB (1993–2010)
  - Bricomanía (1994–2004)
  - La 2 noticias (1994–2020)
  - La noche temática, (1995– )
  - ¡Qué grande es el cine! (1995–2005)
  - Redes (1996–2013)
  - Agrosfera (1997– )
  - El escarabajo verde (1997– )
  - Saber y ganar (1997– )
  - La Botica de la abuela (1997–2006)
  - En otras palabras (1997–2008)
  - La Mandrágora (1997–2009)
  - El Cine de La 2 (1998– )
  - Versión española (1998– )
  - Escuela del deporte (1999–2005)
  - Aquí hay trabajo (2000– )
  - Decogarden (2000–2004)
  - España en comunidad (2000–2020)
  - Shalom (2003– )
  - Los Lunnis (2003–2010)
  - Padres en apuros (2003–2010)
  - Islam hoy (2003–2016)
- Telecinco
  - Informativos Telecinco (1990– )
  - Caiga quien caiga (1996–2008)
  - Crónicas marcianas (1997–2005)
  - La Mirada crítica (1998–2009)
  - 7 vidas (1999–2006)
  - El comisario (1999–2009)
  - Nosolomúsica (1999–2012)
  - Survivor Spain (2000– )
  - Hospital Central (2000–2012)
  - Big Brother Spain (2000–2017)
  - Art Attack (2001–2005)
  - La Noche con Fuentes y Cía (2001–2005)
  - Pecado original (2002–2005)
  - Visto y no visto (2002–2005)
  - Salsa rosa (2002–2006)
  - A tu lado (2002–2007)
  - Estrenos de cartelera (2002–2007)
  - Aquí hay tomate (2003–2008)
  - Los Serrano (2003–2008)
- Canal+
  - El día después (1990–2005)
  - Redacción (1990–2005)
  - Lo + plus (1995–2005)
  - Las noticias del guiñol (1995–2005)
  - Magacine (1996–2005)

== Ending this year ==
- La 1
  - Un, dos, tres... responda otra vez (1972–2004)
  - Música sí (1997–2004)
  - Noche de fiesta (1999–2004)
  - Cruz y raya.com (2000–2004)
  - Esta es mi historia (2001–2004)
  - Cerca de ti (2002–2004)
  - El rival más débil (2002–2004)
  - Un domingo cualquiera (2003–2004)
  - Luna negra (2003–2004)
  - Odiseas digitales (2003–2004)
- La 2
  - América total (1997–2004)
  - A su salud (1997–2004)
  - Negro sobre blanco (1997–2004)
  - Noche abierta, La (1997–2004)
  - El Tercer grado (1997–2004)
  - Al habla (1998–2004)
  - El Debate de la 2 (2002–2004)
  - En verde (2003–2004)
- Antena 3
  - Sabor a ti (1998–2004)
  - Como la vida (1999–2004)
  - Hay una carta para ti (2002–2004)
- Telecinco
  - Día a día (1996–2004)
  - ¿Quiere ser millonario? (1999–2004)
  - Dinamita (2000–2004)

== Changes of network affiliation ==
Show	Moved From	Moved To
El club de la comedia (1999–2017)	La 2	Antena 3

== Foreign series debuts in Spain ==
English title	Spanish title	Original title	Channel	Country	Performers
Cold Case	Caso abierto		La 1	USA	Kathryn Morris
---	Helicops	HeliCops – Einsatz über Berlin	Telecinco	GER	Peter Simonischek
Medabots	Medabots	Medarotto	Telecinco	JAP	
The Norm Show	El Show de Norm		Canal +	USA	Norm Macdonald
The O.C.	The O.C.		La 1	USA	Peter Gallagher
Without a Trace	Sin rastro		Antena 3	USA	Anthony LaPaglia

== Births ==
- 4 February – Fernando Boza, actor
- 5 February – Paula Gallego, actress

== Deaths ==
- 5 January – Pepe Carroll, magician and y host, 46.
- 21 January – Luis Cuenca, actor, 82.
- 7 February – Margarita Landi, journalist, 85.
- 15 May – Narciso Ibáñez Menta, actor, 91.
- 8 June – Nuria Torray, actress, 69.
- 5 July – José de las Casas, journalist, Director de TVE (1968–1970), 78.
- 28 August – Mercedes Vecino, actress, 88.
- 8 September – Matías Prats Cañete, journalist, 90.
- 16 November – Joan Ramón Mainat, producer, 53.
- 31 December – Raúl Matas, host, 83.

== See also ==
- 2004 in Spain
- List of Spanish films of 2004
