= Sandra Daviú =

Spanish television presenter

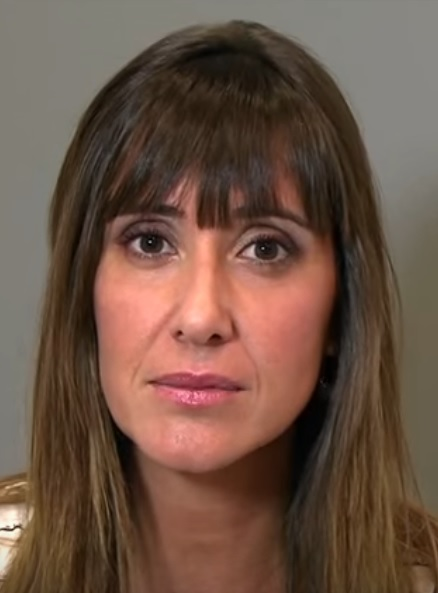
- Sandra Daviú in 2013
- Born: Sandra Daviú Ripoll; 22 March 1975 (age 51); Barcelona, Spain
- Occupation: Television presenter
- Years active: 1998–present

Sandra Daviú Ripoll (Barcelona, March 22, 1975) is a Spanish journalist and television presenter.

== Biography ==
With a degree in Communication Sciences from the Autonomous University of Barcelona, she began her professional career as a presenter, editor, and commentator for Teledeporte.

Later, between 2001 and 2005, she went on to present Escuela del deporte on La 2 together with Carlos Beltrán and Estela Giménez. In 2005, she worked on the program España es with Mon Santiso and Belén Esteve, also on La 2. She was also a reporter for the program España directo on La 1.

She has co-presented several programs on La 1 of TVE, such as Noche de baile with choreographer Poty and El disco del año with Carlos Lozano, both in 2006, in addition to presenting the program La 2, La suerte en tus manos, from 2006 until December 2008.

She also co-hosted the Extraordinary Christmas Draw in 2006 with Marisa Abad and in 2007 with Ana Belén Roy, and she hosted the year-end program Sol de Medianoche on La 2. Also in 2008, she was in charge of broadcasting the Eurovision Dance Contest 2008 which took place in Glasgow.

On August 1, 2008, she joined Antena 3, where she went on to present El diario after its former presenter, Patricia Gaztañaga, left the program. In 2011, the program was canceled.

In 2010, she presented with Jorge Fernández the New Year's Eve Campanadas on Antena 3. In December 2011, she appeared in the celebrity special of ¡Ahora caigo!, being one of them. In 2012, she was in charge of presenting Espejo público during the months of July and August to cover Susanna Griso's vacations.

In March 2013 and combining it with Antena 3, she returned to present the lottery program La suerte en tus manos on La 2 and on La 1, the program El sorteo de la Once.

In June 2013 and August 2013, she was again in charge of the summer version of Espejo público, on Antena 3. Later, in December 2013, she was again Susanna Griso's replacement in Espejo Público, where she served as presenter. At Easter 2014, she returned to the program to act as presenter for 4 days in substitution of Griso. After that, she repeated as Susanna Griso's summer substitute in Espejo público, during July and August of that year.

On September 1, 2014, it was announced her inclusion into TVE to present, alongside Roberto Leal, the new stage of España directo, in which she was in charge of presenting the social chronicle section in addition to being co-presenter of the program. On December 22, 2014, she presented on TVE, with Roberto Leal and Blanca Benlloch, the Extraordinary Christmas Draw; and on January 5, the Three Kings Parade, also with Roberto Leal on TVE.

On May 29, 2015, she said goodbye to the audience of España directo and La suerte en tus manos due to the final stretch of her pregnancy. On September 25, 2015, she returned to present La suerte en tus manos.

Between December 23, 2015 and January 5, 2016, she took over La mañana on La 1, replacing Mariló Montero due to her Christmas vacation In summer 2016, she became one of the collaborators of Amigas y conocidas.

On December 22, 2016 she returned to present the Sorteo Extraordinario de Navidad with Roberto Leal and Blanca Benlloch for TVE; from 2017 to 2019 with the latter and Diego Burbano; and from 2020 with Blanca Benlloch.

In 2019, she worked on the TVE show +Cotas, which aired on Saturdays at 9:30 a.m.
