= Carlos García-Hirschfeld =

Spanish television presenter

- Born: Carlos María García-Hirschfeld González; 7 September 1964 (age 61); Málaga, Spain
- Occupation: Television presenter
- Years active: 1987-present
- Employers: Antena 3 Radio; (1987); Cadena COPE; (1988–1989); Antena3; (1989–2004); Telemadrid; (2004–2006); LaSexta; (2006); Canal+; (2008–2011); Punto radio; (2008–2010); 13TV; (2011); Intereconomía TV; (2013–2014); TVE; (2009; 2013; 2015–2018; 2020–present)

Carlos María García-Hirschfeld González (Málaga, Spain; 7 September 1964) is a Spanish journalist and presenter.

== Biography ==
Carlos García-Hirschfeld, was born in Málaga. At the age of 11 he moved with his family to Madrid, where he would later complete his degree in Information Sciences.

He began his professional career at Antena 3 Radio where he joined in 1987. In 1988 and 1989 he worked at COPE. In November 1989 he joined the founding team of Antena 3 Television. He is editor of bulletins and in September 1990 he starts the first local news program in Madrid. In 1991, under the guidance of Jesús Hermida, he joined the team of young collaborators of the Antena 3 Television magazine El programa de Hermida (1991–1992). García-Hirschfeld continued with the veteran journalist in his next project, Hermida y Cía, which was broadcast until 1995, also on Antena 3 Television. In September of that year, he was selected by the network to inaugurate the new morning news program Antena 3 Noticias, where he remained for the entire season.

In February 1997 he started the program that has brought him the most popularity and with which the public associates his face: Impacto TV, a program that broadcast images of surprising, unusual and sometimes violent events in line with the American program Real TV.

In 1998, the program was renamed Noche de impacto, and García-Hirschfeld presented it until 2004 (in the first season with Silvia Jato). In September 1999, he took over the sports program Por la escuadra, which, however, was not very popular with the public and was withdrawn from the program a few weeks after its premiere. A year later, he directed Web te ve, a program about Internet, presented by Lucía Riaño.

In the 2002–2003 season, he also hosted the motoring program En marcha, on Onda Cero.

In 2004, after thirteen years at Antena 3 Television, he left the channel when he was hired by Telemadrid to replace Javier Reyero in the sports program Fútbol es fútbol, which he hosted with José María del Toro for two seasons.

At the beginning of the 2006–2007 season, he collaborated with Nieves Herrero's show Hoy por ti, also on Telemadrid and in December of that year he participated as a contestant in La Sexta's show El club de Flo.

In 2008, the presenter returns to sports programs in a new program of Canal+ Golf, Golflog. In addition, since September 2008, he has been a contributor to the program Queremos hablar, on Punto Radio, hosted by Ana García Lozano.

In September 2009, he was hired by Televisión Española to present a program on road safety on TVE 2, Seguridad Vital.

In 2011 he signed with Trece to collaborate in the magazines Te damos la mañana, with Inés Ballester and Te damos la tarde, with Nieves Herrero.

In 2013 he returned to television as an occasional contributor to La 1's program Tenemos que hablar.

On 4 December of the same year, he relieved Josep Pedrerol as presenter of Punto pelota at Intereconomía, after a series of disputes due to the debt contracted by the DTT channel with the Catalan presenter.

In 2015, he returned to present Seguridad Vital, in La 1, along with Marta Solano. The program would last until February 2018.

From 2018 to 2020 he continues to work with his production company La Nuez on several communication projects for companies and directs the cooking show La Cocina de Hola, with chef Pepa Muñoz and Master Chef winner Jorge Brazález.

In January 2020 he returns to RTVE producing and presenting again the program Seguridad Vital for La 1. Once again a public service space, which deals comprehensively with road safety and sustainable mobility.

== Radio career ==
- Información deportiva Antena 3 Radio, Late 80's to early 90's.
- Información deportiva Cadena COPE, (1992–1995)
- En marcha Onda Cero (2002–2003)
- Queremos hablar Punto Radio, (2008–2010)

== Television career ==
- El programa de Hermida (1991–1992) on Antena 3 Television. Reporter
- Hermida y Cía (1993–1995) on Antena 3 Television. Contributor
- Antena 3 Noticias (1995–1998) on Antena 3 Television. Host
- Impacto TV (1997–1998) on Antena 3 Television. Host
- Por la escuadra (1999) on Antena 3 Television. Host
- Noche de impacto (1998–2004) on Antena 3 Television. Host
- Fútbol es fútbol (2004–2006) on Telemadrid. Host
- Hoy por ti (2006–2007) on Telemadrid. Contributor
- Golflog (2008–2011) on Canal+ Golf. Host
- Te damos la tarde (2011) on Trece. Contributor
- Te damos la mañana (2011) on Trece. Contributor.
- Punto pelota (2013) on Intereconomía Televisión. Host
- Seguridad vital (2009; 2015–2018; 2020–present) on TVE 2 and on La 1. Director and Host.

== Television collaborations ==
- Telemaratón (Antena 3 Television, 1995)
- La noche solidaria: ¡Paremos la tragedia del Zaire! (Antena 3 Television, 1996)
- La casa de los líos (Antena 3 Television, 1999)
- La piraña (Antena 3 Television, 1999)
- Telemaratón fin de siglo (Antena 3 Television, 1999)
- Diez años juntos. Gala del décimo aniversario de Antena 3 Television (Antena 3 Television, 2000)
- Especial queridos Hostes (Antena 3 Television, 2001)
- Gala Un paso adelante (Antena 3 Television, 2002)
- Mi planeta (Antena 3 Television, 2003)
- Homo Zapping (Antena 3 Television, 2003)
- Mis adorables vecinos (Antena 3 Television, 2005)
- Tenemos que hablar (La 1, 2013)

== Contestant ==
- Furor (1998 and 2001) on Antena 3 Television
- El club de Flo (2006) on La Sexta
- Pasapalabra (2003 and 2008) on Antena 3 Television/Telecinco
