= El cazador (TV series) =

Spanish game show

El cazador is a Spanish television game show, adapted from the British format The Chase. The programme debuted on 10 February 2020 on La 1, where it ran until 26 April 2025. From 12 to 19 May 2025, and from 25 December 2025 to 6 January 2026, it was broadcast on La 2, also owned by Televisión Española. The show was first presented by Ion Aramendi, and from 3 May 2022 by Rodrigo Vázquez.

== History ==
Televisión Española (TVE) announced El cazador in November 2019. By that point, the programme's format The Chase had run for 13 series on ITV in the United Kingdom, and adaptations had been broadcast in ten countries. While TVE had the long-running Saber y ganar on its channel La 2, La 1 had not had a daily game show for several years; commercial rival Antena 3 specialised in afternoon game shows such as ¡Boom!, ¡Ahora caigo!, ¿Quién quiere ser millonario? and Pasapalabra.

The following month, journalist Ion Aramendi was confirmed as host, returning to national television after three years on the Basque Country's EITB. Four champions of other game shows were hired as cazadores on the programme: Erundino Alfonso of ¡Boom!, Ruth de Andrés of Saber y ganar, and Paz Herrera and Lilit Manukyan of Pasapalabra.

El cazador debuted on 10 February 2020, achieving 7.4% of the audience. Its ratings varied from 5.9% to 7.8% and averaged at 6.9% up to 5 March, when it was renewed.

David Leo, another Pasapalabra champion, was added as a cazador in 2021. He left the show in 2023 due to a trial for domestic violence, of which he was acquitted. Orestes Barbero, whose team had won €30,000 on El cazador in June 2020, was added as a cazador in October 2023.

In March 2022, it was announced that Aramendi was leaving TVE for Mediaset, owners of the channel Telecinco. His successor was Rodrigo Vázquez, who had 14 years of experience from Televisión de Galicia. Vázquez's first episode was broadcast on 3 May, and his first month in the role matched Aramendi's last with 9.1% average audience share.

The Royal Spanish Academy criticised the show in January 2023 for including a question with the word "chique", a gender-neutral way of saying a young person.

In November 2023, TVE opted to broadcast El cazador twice daily. Twelve months later, however, new recordings were cancelled; filmed episodes including five prime-time specials would still air into April 2025. That month, it was announced that it would continue to be produced for La 2. The final episode on La 1 aired on 26 April, and the first on La 2 on 12 May. New episodes on La 2 only lasted until 19 May, and repeats were shown until October, when it was replaced by La pirámide. El cazador returned to La 2 for 25 December 2025.

La noche de los cazadores (literally "The Night of the Chasers"), an adaptation of Beat the Chasers, debuted on 17 January 2022. The prime-time spin-off was renewed for a second season in May.

== Format ==
A team of four strangers take on a quiz show veteran, known as a cazador, for a jackpot. Individually, a contestant is asked general knowledge questions and awarded money for each correct answer. The contestant then competes against the cazador on a board, with each correct answer leading the contestant one step closer to banking the money, and the cazador one step closer to catching the contestant and eliminating them.

In the final, the contestants who outran the cazador have two minutes to answer as many questions as they can together. The cazador is then given the same amount of time to match their feat. If the contestants win, the jackpot is divided between them.
