= Picallo =

Origin
- Language: Spanish
- Region of origin: Galicia, Spain

Other names
- Variant forms: Picar, Picascia, Picaso, and Picazo.

Picallo is a Spanish surname from Galicia. It is common in Spain, Latin America, and the Philippines. It is a very popular surname in Argentina.

People with the surname include:

- Faustino Picallo, Argentine politician
- Isabel Blanco Picallo, Spanish actress and television presenter
- Juan Antonio Suárez Picallo, Spanish politician, agrarianist and journalist
- Maxín Picallo, Spanish sculptor
- Paula Vázquez Picallo (born 1974), Spanish television presenter
- Ramón Suárez Picallo, Spanish politician
