= Alicia Senovilla =

Spanish journalist

- Born: Alicia Martínez Senovilla; 29 March 1969 (age 57); Madrid, Spain
- Education: Complutense University of Madrid
- Occupations: Journalist, presenter
- Employers: Antena 3; Canal Sur; Telecinco; Telemadrid

Alicia Martínez Senovilla (born 29 March 1969) is a Spanish journalist and presenter.

== Career ==
=== Beginnings (1990–1995) ===
Alicia Senovilla earned a degree in tourism from the Complutense University of Madrid. She began her professional career on the program Buenos días from January to October 1990.

She then moved to the Radio Nacional de España local station for Cádiz, where she presented the magazine Apúntate cinco.

=== Canal Sur (1995–1997) ===
In 1995 she made the leap to television, joining Canal Sur, the regional television network of Andalusia. At first she hosted the daily citizen participation program ¡Qué buena gente!, where she made her first forays into a format to which she would later return on national television: a talk show in which anonymous citizens recount their personal experiences before the camera. Subsequently, from 1995 to March 1997, she presented the informative contest Conocer Andalucía.

=== Telecinco (1997–1999) ===
From May to September 1997, Senovilla appeared on national television for the first time when she was selected as an alternate for Ana García Lozano, who was on maternity leave from the talk show Ana. Her self-confidence and spontaneity before the camera won her the sympathies of the public, and Telecinco decided, in November of that year, to give her the opportunity to host her own show, the debate program Ya empezamos.

The following season, she took charge of an evening talk show on the same network: Las tardes de Alicia, which ran from 1998 to 1999.

=== Antena 3 (1999–2001) ===
In 1999, Senovilla broke her relationship with Telecinco by signing for Antena 3, which put her on a show intended to compete with that of María Teresa Campos in the morning. It was a testimonial program entitled Como la vida misma, which premiered in September, and for a time reached an average ratings share of 20%.

A year later, in September 2000, the program was renamed Como la vida, extending its running time and content. Despite acceptable ratings, Antena 3 decided to withdraw the program from its lineup in 2001.

=== Telemadrid (2001–2002) ===
In September 2001, Senovilla signed with Telemadrid to present a program almost identical to her previous one, and in the same time slot, with the title Las mañanas de Alicia. This aired during the 2001–2002 season. Beginning in November 2001, she also appeared on Dímelo todo, a weekly nighttime talk show.

=== Antena 3 (2003–2006) ===
In January 2003, due to poor results that Antena 3 had obtained after Senovilla's departure with the morning program De buena mañana (presented successively by Juan Ramón Lucas and Isabel Gemio), the network's directors decided to bring her back on to host Como la vida in an attempt to regain its audience.

The show, in this new stage, devoted special attention to celebrity gossip (Spanish: la prensa rosa). Nevertheless, Senovilla failed to surpass the ratings of her rival on Telecinco, María Teresa Campos, reaching a share of 17.9% in September 2003. Como la vida was canceled at the end of that season, at the same time that Antena 3 signed Campos to host its morning program.

On Antena 3, Senovilla also led El castillo de las mentes prodigiosas (2004), La hora de la verdad (2004–2005), the magazine La buena onda de la tarde (2005), and replaced Jaime Cantizano on ¿Dónde estás corazón? during the summer of 2006.

=== Canal Sur (2006) ===
In September 2006 she returned to Canal Sur, where she presented the magazine La buena gente.

=== Castilla la Mancha Television (2007–present) ===
Senovilla presented the show Regreso al futuro and the evening magazine Tarde de Ronda on Castilla la Mancha Television. In 2011–2012, and again from 2014 to 2018, she presented the matchmaking program A tu vera. On 9 November 2014, she premiered the children's copla program Las Niñ@s de Tus Ojos. In the summer of 2016 she hosted a new music program called La vida es una fiesta, which sought out the best orchestral singer.

=== Antena 3 (2011) ===
After a few years away from national television, Alicia Senovilla replaced Susanna Griso on Espejo público during the months of July and August 2011. This substitution was marked by low ratings for the program during the summer.

=== Telemadrid (2018) ===
On 12 February 2018, Alicia Senovilla returned to Telemadrid to host the current events show En boca de todos. The program ended its run on 22 June 2018.

== Personal life ==
Alicia Senovilla met musician Erasmo Ubera at Seville Expo '92, and they married four years later. They remained together for 22 years and had two children. They divorced by mutual agreement in 2014.

== Selected TV programs ==
Years	Title	Channel
1990	Buenos días	TVE
1995	¡Qué buena gente!	Canal Sur TV
1995–1997	Conocer Andalucía	Canal Sur TV
1997	Ana	Telecinco
1997–1998	Ya Empezamos	Telecinco
1998–1999	Las Tardes de Alicia	Telecinco
1999–2001	Como la vida	Antena 3
2001–2002	Las mañanas de Alicia	Telemadrid
2001–2002	Dímelo todo	Telemadrid
2003–2004	Como la vida	Antena 3
2004	El castillo de las mentes prodigiosas	Antena 3
2004–2005	La hora de la verdad	Antena 3
2005	La buena onda de la tarde	Antena 3
2006	¿Dónde estás corazón? (summer)	Antena 3
2006–2007	La buena gente	Canal Sur TV
2007–2011	Tarde de Ronda	Castilla-La Mancha Televisión
2011	Espejo público	Antena 3
2011–2012 / 2014–2017	A tu vera	Castilla-La Mancha Televisión
2014–2015	Las niñ@s de tus ojos	Castilla-La Mancha Televisión
2016	La vida es una fiesta	Castilla-La Mancha Televisión
2018	En boca de todos	Telemadrid
