= Lilit Manukyan =

Armenian game show contestant

Lilit Manukyan (Armenian: Լիլիթ Մանուկյան; born 1979) is an Armenian game show contestant in Spain. In 2014, she became the first foreigner and first non-native Spanish speaker to win the vocabulary-based show Pasapalabra, taking a jackpot of €318,000. From 2020 to 2026, she was a "Chaser" on El cazador, Spain's version of The Chase.

== Early and personal life ==
Manukyan was born in Yerevan in Armenia, and lived in Russia between the ages of 16 and 28. In Russia, she graduated with a degree in foreign business and worked in several companies. She then moved to Spain, choosing the country due to having a cousin there and not perceiving it to be hostile to immigrants.

Manukyan had taken only a few classes in Spanish before arriving in the country in June 2007, and began working as a babysitter or car washer, making far less than €1,000 per month. As of 2022, Manukyan was married and had a daughter, and was employed as a commercial operator coordinator at a Renfe train station in Valencia.

== Game shows ==
Manukyan, who was already a fan of television game shows, began watching Saber y ganar and Pasapalabra in Spain. When she discovered she knew the answers to ten of the questions on the latter's rosco final, she began training to win it, using an online forum to learn from a former jackpot winner. Believing that winning Pasapalabra was more economically viable than her work at the time, she studied six hours a day for the show. Manukyan said in 2022 that her ability in the Spanish language was not perfect, particularly on grammar, but that Pasapalabra only required knowledge of definitions.

Manukyan began competing on Pasapalabra in December 2012. After 37 shows, on 21 November 2014, she won €318,000, becoming the first foreigner and first non-native speaker of Spanish to win the jackpot on the vocabulary-based show. She lasted 85 episodes on the show. Manukyan's jackpot and number of episodes were both the second-most for a female contestant on the show, behind fellow future cazadora Paz Herrera. In September 2017, to mark the show's tenth year on Telecinco, Manukyan took part in a Supercopa, finishing runner-up to fellow future cazador David Leo and taking €25,000.

After Pasapalabra, Manukyan also competed on Atrapa un millón, the Spanish version of The Million Pound Drop on Antena 3; and 15 episodes of Saber y ganar on La 2.

In December 2019, Manukyan was announced as one of four game show veterans to be cazadores on El cazador, the Spanish adaptation for La 1 of British game show The Chase. She combined the role with her job in Valencia. Manukyan had to study general knowledge for the role, with her weaknesses being football and modern music.
