= Constantino Romero =

Spanish actor (1947–2013)

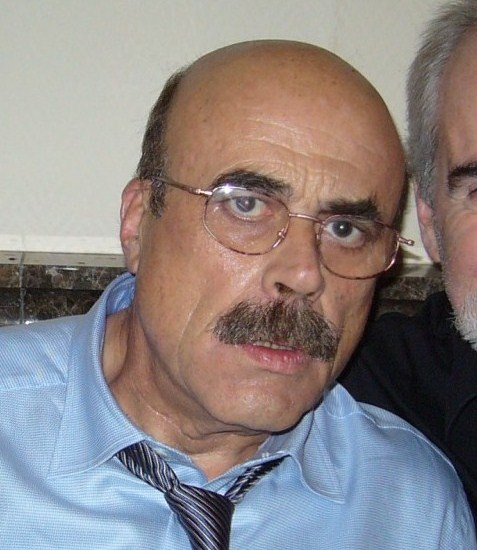
- Born: Constantino Romero García; 29 May 1947; Alcalá de Henares, Spain
- Died: 12 May 2013 (aged 65); Barcelona, Spain
- Resting place: Cemetery of Montjuïc
- Occupations: Voice actor; presenter
- Years active: 1965–2012
- Spouse: JoAnne Stier (m. 1973)
- Awards: TP de Oro (1996); Antena de Oro 1999

Constantino Romero García (29 May 1947 – 12 May 2013) was a Spanish voice actor and presenter. Due to his deep voice, he was most known for dubbing into Spanish and Catalan other actors like Clint Eastwood, James Earl Jones and Arnold Schwarzenegger in the Terminator or The Expendables films.

== Biography ==
=== Radio and TV ===
Romero was born in Alcalá de Henares and grew up in Chinchilla de Monte-Aragón (Albacete) where his mother lives. All his family are from Chinchilla and Almansa. His professional career began as an announcer at Radio Barcelona and RNE until 1985 when he made his first appearance in television as the host of the program Ya sé que tienes novio. From 1987 to 1992 he presented the game show El tiempo es oro on TVE. Later he moved to Antena 3 where he was very popular.

Later he appeared in the regional TVs with the game show La Silla and replaced Silvia Jato in Pasapalabra in Antena 3 when she became a mother. He worked at CMT from 2002 to 2010. In 1984 he made his first stage appearance with L'Ópera de tres rals directed by Mario Gas. Both worked together in the musicals Sweeney Todd in 1995 and A Little Night Music by Stephen Sondheim. Another play in which he appeared was Little Shop of Horrors, giving voice to the carnivorous plant.

=== Voice actor ===
Romero was known as a voice over actor for some famous actors. Among his notable appearances in Castilian Spanish versions of foreign-language films, he was the voice of William Shatner as James T. Kirk in Star Trek, Arnold Schwarzenegger as the title character in The Terminator film series, Sean Connery as William T. O'Niel in Outland, Roger Moore as the title character in the James Bond franchise and James Earl Jones' role as Darth Vader in the Star Wars franchise.

His voice also appears in the Spanish dubs of several Disney films, including The Lion King as Mufasa, The Hunchback of Notre-Dame as Frollo, Mulan as the Supreme Ancestor, and in The Jungle Book 2 as Shere Khan.

=== Awards ===
In 1999 he won an Antena de Oro Award and two TP de Oro awards.

=== Retirement and death ===
Romero retired on 12 December 2012, after his last job as a voice actor: Trouble with the Curve. He announced it through his Twitter account: "Thanks for the affection. It's been 47 years of work. And a whole life. Radio, TV, theatre, dubbing. It's been worth it. A hug. That's all folks! " (in English in the original). He showed his thankfulness to his fans with the words "I've always known that the best part of my job were people".

Romero died from complications of amyotrophic lateral sclerosis on 12 May 2013 in Barcelona just two and a half weeks shy of his 66th birthday. He was laid to rest at the Cemetery of Montjuïc.

== Host ==
- Ya sé que tienes novio (1985) in TVE.
- El tiempo es oro (1987–1992) in TVE.
- 3x4 (1989), in TVE, replaces Julia Otero in her holidays.
- La vida es juego (1992–1993) in TVE.
- Valor y coraje (1993–1995) in TVE.
- La Parodia Nacional (1996–2001) in Antena 3.
- Alta Tensión (1998–1999) in Antena 3.
- Tierra tragame (1999) in Antena 3.
- Telerisa (1999) in Antena 3.
- Una vez en la vida (2001) in Antena 3.
- Domino Day (2001–2002) en Antena 3.
- Destino de Castilla a La Mancha (2002) in CMT.
- Pasapalabra (2002) in Antena 3.
- La silla (2002) in Telemadrid.
- Reparto a domicilio (2003) in Telemadrid.
- Un paseo por Castilla–La Mancha (2005) en CMT.
- Siempre ellas (2006) in CMT.
- Matrícula (2007–2009) in Cantabria TV.
- Cantando en familia (2008) in CMT.
- Tierra de Tesoros (2009) in CMT.

== Filmography ==
=== Actor ===
- Lola (1986)
- Galeria oberta (1986) (TV series)
- La ronda (1987) (TV movie)
- 13 x 13 (1987) (TV series)
- La veritat oculta (1988)
- A l'est del Besòs (1988) (TV series)
- L'amor és estrany (1988)
- Las chicas de hoy en día (1991) (TV series)
- Don Quijote de Orson Welles (1992)
- No sé bailar (1992) (TV series)
- Olímpicament mort (1993) (TV movie)
- Oh, Espanya! (1996) (TV series)
- El sueño de una noche... vieja (1997) (TV movie)
- Lisístrata (2002)
- 800 balas (2002)
- 7 vidas (2003) (TV series)
- El corazón de las tinieblas (2004) (short)
- Di que sí (2004)
- Bujias y Manias (2005)
- Star Wars: Extinción (2006) (short)
- Héroes (2010)
- L'Edèn (2010) (TV Movie)
- Elefante (2011) (short)
- Copito de Nieve (2011)

=== Dubbing (highlights) ===
Clint Eastwood voice in:

- Kelly's Heroes (1970)
- Two Mules for Sister Sara (1970)
- Dirty Harry (1971)
- Joe Kidd (1972)
- The Eiger Sanction (1975)
- The Outlaw Josey Wales (1976)
- Escape from Alcatraz (1979)
- Tightrope (1984)
- Pale Rider (1985)
- Heartbreak Ridge (1986)
- The Dead Pool (1988)
- Pink Cadillac (1989)
- White Hunter Black Heart (1990)
- The Rookie (1990)
- Unforgiven (1992)
- A Perfect World (1993)
- The Bridges of Madison County (1995)
- Absolute Power (1997)
- True Crime (1999)
- Space Cowboys (2000)
- Blood Work (2002)
- Million Dollar Baby (2005)
- Gran Torino (2009)
- Trouble with the Curve (2012)

James Earl Jones voice in:

- Swashbuckler (1976)
- Star Wars (1977)
- The Empire Strikes Back (1980)
- Conan the Barbarian (1982)
- Return of the Jedi (1983)
- The Lion King (1994)
- The Lion King II: Simba's Pride (1998)
- Fantasia 2000 (1999)
- The Lion King: Simba's Mighty Adventure (2001)
- Robots (2005)
- Revenge of the Sith (2005)
- Click (2006)
- Earth (2007)

Rutger Hauer voice in:

- Blade Runner (1982)

Tony Jay voice in:

- The Hunchback of Notre Dame (1996)
- Austin Powers: The Spy Who Shagged Me (1999)
- The Jungle Book 2 (2003)

Roger Moore voice in:

- Live and Let Die (1973)
- The Man with the Golden Gun (1974)
- That Lucky Touch (1975)
- Street People (1976)
- The Spy Who Loved Me (1977)
- Moonraker (1979)
- For Your Eyes Only (1981)
- The Cannonball Run (1981)
- Octopussy (1983)
- Curse of the Pink Panther (1983)
- The Naked Face (1984)
- A View to a Kill (1985)
- Fire, Ice and Dynamite (1990)
- Spice World (1997)

Arnold Schwarzenegger voice in:

- Terminator (1984)
- Terminator 2: Judgment Day (1991)
- Terminator 3: Rise of the Machines (2003)
- The Expendables (2010)
- The Expendables 2 (2012)

William Shatner voice in:

- Star Trek: The Motion Picture (1979)
- Star Trek II: The Wrath of Khan (1982)
- Airplane II: The Sequel (1982)
- Star Trek III: The Search for Spock (1984)
- Star Trek IV: The Voyage Home (1986)
- Star Trek V: The Final Frontier (1989)
- Star Trek VI: The Undiscovered Country (1991)
- Boomerang (1992)
- Star Trek Generations (1994)
- Showtime (2002)

Louis Gossett Jr. voice in:

- The Laughing Policeman (1973)
- An Officer and a Gentleman (1982)
- Iron Eagle (1986)
- Captive Heart: The James Mink Story (1996)
- Deceived (2002)
