= Rodrigo Vázquez (TV presenter) =

Spanish television presenter

- Born: Rodrigo Vázquez Rodríguez; 20 November 1987 (age 38); Ourense, Galicia, Spain
- Education: University of Santiago de Compostela
- Occupations: Journalist; television presenter
- Years active: 2008–present

Rodrigo Vázquez Rodríguez (born 20 November 1987) is a Spanish journalist and television presenter. Since 2022, Vázquez hosts El cazador, the Spanish adaptation of The Chase, and the game show Todos contra 1, both for Televisión Española (TVE).

== Biography ==
After graduating in journalism at the University of Santiago de Compostela, in 2008, Vázquez began his professional career at Televisión de Galicia (TVG). He gained experience in the Telexornal news broadcast, especially in sports and agriculture content. He also worked for Radio Galega.

In 2014, Vázquez debuted as a television presenter on the regional program Aquí Galicia. Shortly after he hosted the music competition show Oh Happy Day, also on TVG. In the following years, he continued hosting mainly entertainment shows like Verbenalia or O País máis grande do mundo for TVG, and in 2018 he conducted the New Year's Eve special from the Praza do Obradoiro in Santiago de Compostela.

In 2022, Vázquez jumped to national television as he was hired by Televisión Española (TVE) to host El cazador, the Spanish adaptation of the British game show The Chase. Since January 2023, Vázquez, also hosts the game show Todos contra 1, the Spanish adaptation of Danish format Alle mod 1, alongside Raúl Gómez. In January and February 2023, along with Mónica Naranjo and Inés Hernand, he hosted the second edition of Benidorm Fest, a song competition to determine Spain's entry for the Eurovision Song Contest.
