= Cristina Tàrrega =

Spanish television presenter

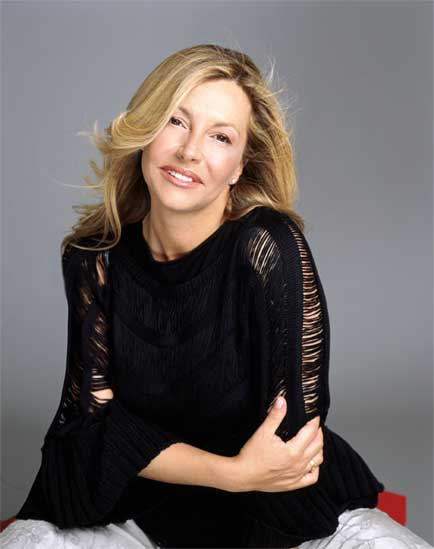
Cristina Tárrega

Cristina Tárrega (Valencia, 1968) is a Spanish television presenter.

She studied journalism and started working in radio. She married the football player Mami Quevedo in 1999 and they have a son.

== Radio ==
- Radio Intercontinental
- Cadena 40 Principales
- Onda Cero
- Cadena Dial, La caña que llevas dentro (1994)
- Cadena SER, El gusto es mío.

== TV ==
- 1995: Bullfighting program in Canal +
- 1995: En casa con Rafaella with Raffaella Carrà, Telecinco
- 1997–1999: Sola en la ciudad, Telemadrid
- 1999: Cristina, amiga mía, Antena 3
- 1999: Los comunes, directed by Jesús Hermida, Antena 3
- 1999: Póker de damas, Antena 3
- 1999: Crónicas marcianas, Telecinco
- 2000: Hablemos claro, Canal Sur
- 2000: Qué calor, Canal Sur
- 2000–2001: Debat Obert, Canal 9
- 2003: Día a día, directed by María Teresa Campos, Telecinco
- 2003: Mirando al mar, Antena 3
- 2004: Cada día, by María Teresa Campos, Antena 3
- 2005: Vive la vida, Telemadrid
- 2006–2008: Territorio Comanche, Telemadrid
- 2007–2008: Gent de Tàrrega, Canal 9

== Films ==
- Torrente 2: Misión en Marbella, by Santiago Segura, 2001
