= Jorge Fernández Madinabeitia =

Spanish model, actor, and basketball player

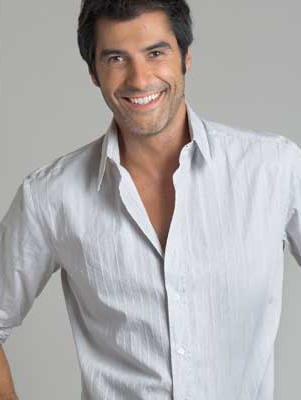
- Born: Jorge Fernández Madinabeitia; 8 August 1972 (age 53); Alicante, Valencia, Spain
- Occupation(s): TV presenter, actor, model, basketball player
- Children: Ian
- Website: http://www.jorgefernandez.tv

Jorge Fernández Madinabeitia (born 8 August 1972 in Alicante, Spain) is a Spanish TV presenter, model, actor and basketball player from the Basque Country. He is best known for hosting La ruleta de la suerte, the Spanish version of Wheel of Fortune, since 2006.

== Biography ==
Born in Alicante, Fernández was raised in the Gipuzkoan town of Mondragón/Arrasate. Fernández is graduated in sports from the University of the Basque Country at the Basque Institute of Physical Education in Vitoria and worked as a sports teacher at the Virgen Niña school in Gasteiz.

When he was 26, he joined a model academy in San Sebastián. He was also a basketball player debuting in Liga ACB with the TAU Ceramica Baskonia from Vitoria-Gasteiz in 1998. In 1999 he won the title of Míster España, a title he retained in 2000 since no competition was held that year; he is to date the only man who has been Mister Spain for two consecutive years.

After winning Míster España, he started his career as an actor and presenter of numerous TV shows, such as Los Serrano, from 2003 until 2008 and the game show La quinta esfera in 2003.

Since 2006, Fernández has hosted La Ruleta de la Suerte, and from 2008 to 2010 he hosted the reality show Esta casa era una ruina. He won the 2008 Premio Ondas for Best TV Presenter. He hosted the Twelve Grapes on Antena 3 in 2006/07 and 2010/11.

From 2019 until 2021, he hosted El juego de los anillos, the Spanish version of 5 Gold Rings. In 2024, he hosted a series of primetime specials of La Ruleta de la Suerte.

== Works ==
- Euskadi Reta
- Gran Hermano (2001–2002). Host.
- Los Serrano (2003–2008). as Andrés.
- La quinta esfera (2003). Host.
- Gran Hermano VIP: El Desafío (2004). Host.
- El verano de tu vida (2005). Host with Ivonne Reyes.
- Gente de Primera (2005). Host.
- Los más (2006). Host with Paula Vázquez
- La Ruleta de la Suerte (2006–present). Host.
- Esta casa era una ruina (2007-2010). Host.
