= La ruleta de la fortuna =

Spanish television game show

La ruleta de la fortuna (original title) or La ruleta de la suerte (since 2006) is the Spanish version of Wheel of Fortune. The first incarnation ran from 1990 to 1992 in Antena 3, the second one from 1993 to 1997 in Telecinco, and then, after a nine-year hiatus, a revival has been made on Antena 3 beginning in 2006. The show also airs internationally via Antena 3 Internacional.

== Original 1990s versions (La ruleta de la fortuna) ==
The 1990s versions all awarded cash in the previous Spanish currency of the peseta, and the wheel's values were from 5,000 to 100,000 pesetas, with vowels costing 50,000 pesetas. Only three normal puzzles and the bonus round were played in this version. This version sometimes used two letter turners both working at once (unlike the 2008 Filipino version which had two puzzle board assistants alternating). The wheel also had a X2 (double wedge) and a 1/2 wedge (listed as "Divide by 2"), but unlike the current version, landing on the 1/2 cost the player half their cash and their turn. The Free Spin ("Turno Extra") was awarded automatically but did not carry over to the next round. The player who solved the puzzle kept their bank plus a bonus of 100,000 pesetas.

The scoreboards in the Telecinco version displayed two scores: the current round score on top and the grand total on the bottom.

== Kids version (La ruleta de la fortuna junior) ==
A short-lived kids Spanish version of Wheel 2000 (a.k.a Wheel of Fortune 2000) called La Ruleta de la Fortuna Junior (The Wheel of Fortune Junior) hosted by Silvia Ruiz, briefly aired on Telecinco from 1998 until 1999.

== Current version's (La ruleta de la suerte) gameplay ==
Jorge Fernández hosts the program since 2006. The co-hostess is Laura Moure. There is also a music band in the show, formed by Joaquín Padilla (leader of Iguana Tango, voice and guitar), Chema (keyboard) and José (drums); they perform the songs of musical toss-up puzzles, and a song before the bonus round.

On April 17, 2026, former announcer from the American version, Jim Thorntonmade a cameo appearance on the show in order to celebrate its 20th Anniversary.

In 2026, a man named Brian Péreztemporarily replaces Moure as co-host in order to care for her daughter Zoe, although this is the first for the Spain version to have a male letter toucher for the series, he is the fourth of the international franchise to do so. Other versions that had male letter touchers were Yair Juri for La Rueda de la Surte in 2018, Lucas Loccisano for La Ruleta de tus Sueños and Niko Saarinen for Onnenpyörää VIP in 2021.

The program starts with Joaquín presenting the contestants' names and welcoming Jorge and Laura. The three players begin the game with a toss-up worth €100, the lyrics of a song. The band performs this song after a contestant solves the puzzle. This toss-up puzzle determines interview order and the first spinner.

The first puzzle after the musical toss-up is a regular puzzle. The second puzzle is the Hidden Letter puzzle (Panel de la letra oculta) in which the players can claim the Super Wild Card (Super Comodín).

The next puzzles vary in every show, however, the Jackpot Puzzle (Panel con bote) is always the last one before the Bonus Round.

As of September 13, 2016, each player would be guaranteed €100. Should a contestant end the show with no cash, they are awarded €100.

The game is played the same as the basic U.S. game, but with a few exceptions. See the article Wheel of Fortune (American game show) for more information.

The current version's podium color sequence is blue-red-yellow.

=== Bonus Round ===
The player with the biggest total spins a smaller wheel containing cash amounts of €1000, €1500, €2000, €2500, €3000, €3500, €4000, €4500, €5000, €6000, €7000, €8000, and a car. They get the letters R, S, F, Y, and O, (originally C, T, G, L, and I, later C, L, X, G, and A until August 30, 2015) and call 3 more consonants and a vowel before getting 10 seconds to solve the puzzle and win the bonus prize. The audience members all stand up when the bonus puzzle is solved. In the event the winner proceeds to the bonus round while holding a wedge that says "AYUDA FINAL," they can choose from a red, yellow, and blue envelope that will allow them an extra consonant, an extra vowel, or five more seconds. If they had both "Ayuda Final" and "Super Comodín", they could choose two envelopes.

The €7,000 and €8,000 envelopes were introduced on September 28, 2012. There have been cases in which the maximum prize has been higher: on the special ninth anniversary of April 17, 2015, the maximum prize was €9,000, in the special tenth anniversary of April 18, 2016 was €10,000 and in the special eleventh anniversary of April 18, 2017 were €11,000. In the special charity with celebrities, the car is replaced by another one over with €10,000. Since September 11, 2013, the Co-presenter is in charge of, once revealed the prize that contained the envelope that the contestant has obtained, to reveal where the car was.

== La ruleta de la suerte Noche ==
Starting in 2024, along with the daily show, La ruleta de la suerte Noche (Wheel of Fortune Night) are special programs aired on Saturday nights, also hosted by Jorge Fernández and Laura Moure. Prizes in this show are much higher, being €100,000 the greatest possible amount.

The show starts with a toss-up worth €1000. Values in the wheel range from €25 to €2000 (along with a Bankrupt/€5000/Bankrupt wedge). Four €25,000 wedges are present on the wheel, these do not award cash immediately; instead, players hold them and try to carry them to the bonus round.

In the bonus round, envelopes in the wheel range from €6,000 to €20,000. However, if the player has any €25,000 wedges, the highest envelope is replaced by €25,000 multiplied by the number of wedges the player has, meaning the highest possible prize is €100,000.

== Puzzles ==
Unlike the American version, each puzzle belongs to a given type, as indicated by on-screen transitions. A puzzle can fall under any one of these types (in playing order, although the order may vary), all of which come from the current show running since 2006.

=== Prueba de Velocidad (Toss-Up puzzle) ===
As in the American version, a puzzle is revealed one letter at a time, and a player may buzz in at any time to solve. Unlike the U.S. version, players are allowed an unlimited number of guesses. There are three Toss-Ups in each show, two at the beginning and one in the near end. Usually, the first and third are song lyrics, while the second is often a "crazy headline" (any piece of news that is strange or funny). Each puzzle is worth €100. If the puzzle is the lyrics of a song, the band performs that song after the puzzle is solved.

The winner of any kind of Toss-Up puzzle will be the first to spin the wheel in the next puzzle.

In the events of a tie before the Bonus Round, a Toss-Up is played to decide the player that proceeds to this Round.

=== Prueba de Velocidad Decreciente (Decreasing Toss-Up puzzle) ===
The text on the puzzle is a notable quote (and the category is the author of the quote). At the beginning of the puzzle, a counter starting at €2000 appears, and its amount decreases every time a letter is shown. When a player buzzes, the counter stops; if solved correctly, the player wins the amount in the counter.

=== Triple Prueba de Velocidad (Triple toss-up puzzle) ===
Three consecutive toss-up puzzles with the same category are played consecutively, each of them being worth €100. Should a player solve all three puzzles, they get €600 instead of €300.

=== Prueba de Velocidad Enigmática (Enigmatic Toss-Up puzzle) ===
Similar to the previous, but the category is a question (for example, "Which country is it?"), and every puzzle is a clue to the question. Players earn €100 for every Toss-Up solved and €300 if they answer correctly to the question in the category.

=== Panel normal (Normal Puzzle) ===
The standard puzzle.

=== Panel con pregunta (Question puzzle) ===
A variation of the standard puzzle, its category is a question (for example, "Which bird is it?"), and the text in the puzzle is a clue. The contestant who solves the puzzle gets an extra €200 if they answer the question correctly.

=== Panel de Tú Eliges (You Choose the Puzzle) ===
A standard puzzle in which, at the beginning, the player with the turn chooses between two given categories.

=== Panel con Crono (Counter-Clock Puzzle) ===
This puzzle is somewhat different. It is similar to the US version's "Final Spin", except that a time limit of 2 minutes is set, and the contestants have to say one letter at a time, vowel or consonant, and if it is in the puzzle, they'll have 3 seconds to try to answer the puzzle.

Recently, a variation of this puzzle known as "Panel Crono Imagen" has begun to replace it, or to move it to the middle of the show. In this new puzzle, the host gives a question (such as "What's wrong here?") and a clue appears at the board (such as This is man's best friend). Contestants will have 45 seconds in which to flip the letters to reveal an image behind and to finally answer to the host's question. (There would be a dog with whiskers in the above example)

Both puzzles are worth €300 (€500 on the Premium edition and €600 on November 24, 2017) if a person can solve it, otherwise they are worth nothing.

=== Panel de la letra oculta (Hidden Letter Puzzle) ===
Before starting the puzzle, the host reveals the "hidden letter", which appears on-screen only for the audience at home, and is one of the consonants present on the puzzle. Then it is played as a regular puzzle, except that if a player says the hidden letter, which would appear in the puzzle colored in green, they will get a special wedge, not present in the wheel, that is only winnable in this puzzle called "Super Comodín", which can be used as a regular "Comodín", a "Doble Letra" or an "Ayuda Final" and has the shape of these three individual wedges all together. If no one finds the hidden letter or the one solving it doesn't have the "Super Comodín", no one will win the wedge.

=== Panel de la Palabra (Word Puzzle) ===
The puzzle has only one word, and after showing a letter, the board immediately hides it, so only one letter shows at a time. The board continues randomly revealing and hiding letters until someone solves the puzzle, worth €100.

=== Panel con Bote (Jackpot Puzzle) ===
Played like the Jackpot round in the U.S. version, the jackpot begins at €1,000 and increases with every spin. The category of the Jackpot puzzle is usually related to food and drink. It is played as a regular puzzle and can be solved at any time; but in order to win the jackpot, the player has to spin up the wedge that says BOTE, call a correct consonant, and solve the puzzle. The audience typically stands up when the wedge is hit, and this round also sees them use tambourines and other noisemakers. This is usually the last puzzle before the Bonus Round and in any case it always decides the big winner. Only if the puzzle was solved quicker than expected, a toss-up would be played after it to stall for time, but it wouldn't change the winner.

=== Former puzzle types ===
- Panel con Premio (Prize Puzzle)
  - A random four digit amount is revealed prior to the start of the round, and the player that solves the puzzle wins that amount as a bonus.
- Panel 4 Opciones (4 Options' Puzzle)
  - The contestant who starts this round chooses a category from 4 options.
- Panel del Bienestar (Welfare's Puzzle)
- Panel Misterio (Mystery Puzzle)
  - The puzzle has an extra puzzle attached to it (a la the short-lived "Puzzler" round in the U.S. version), and the player who solves the first puzzle gets a shot at the mystery puzzle. The letters P, I, S, T, and A (which conform the word "pista", "clue"), are revealed, and the player picks three consonants and a vowel as in the bonus round, and then has 10 seconds to solve it. Solving the puzzle earns extra cash.
- Panel de Internet (Internet Puzzle)
  - The player who solves the puzzle wins a computer plus €100.
- Panel del Espectador (Viewer's Puzzle)
  - These are puzzles where the home viewers can win money by texting the correct answer to the puzzle.

== The Wheel ==
Values range from €25 to €200. The audience typically chants common rhythmic chants as the player spins it. It has two Lose a Turn (PIERDE TURNO) and two Bankrupt (QUIEBRA) wedges, as well as a Quiebra/€1000/Quiebra wedge.

=== Vowels ===
Vowels are worth a flat €50 (€100 on early shows and on the "premium" edition in 2011, €25 on November 24, 2017), and must be purchased prior to spinning the wheel.

==== Other Spaces ====
- €0
  - The player has to call a correct consonant in order to continue, but earns nothing. Introduced on September 27, 2012.
- X2 and 1/2
  - Respectively double and cut the player's score in half if any correct consonant appears. "Doble letra" can be used in X2, allowing the player to multiply again their score.
- Ayuda Final (Bonus Round Hint)
  - Similar to the U.S. and Australian Wild Card Wedge. The player who lands on it and calls a letter in the puzzle gets to pick it up, and they keep it for the rest of the game. If that player gets to the Bonus Round, they can choose from three given envelopes (blue, red, or yellow) which award an extra consonant, an extra vowel, or five more seconds. As the "Super Comodín" works also as an "Ayuda Final", in the case the player getting to the Bonus Round has the "Ayuda Final" and the "Super Comodín", they get two envelopes instead of one.
- Comodín (Wild Card)
  - Works the same way as the Free Spin token in the U.S. (prior to it being replaced by a Free Play). Players earn it by calling a letter in the puzzle, and can redeem it to keep their turn should they lose it. It does not save the player from losing the money if they land on the Bankrupt.
- Doble Letra (Double Letter)
  - Works similar to the Wildcard in the U.S., it allows the player to give an extra consonant in the same spin. Unlike the U.S. Wildcard, it cannot be taken to the Bonus Round, and if the player buys a vowel after saying the consonant, he can't use it.
- Super Comodín (Super Wild Card)
  - It is not a wedge in the wheel. A player claims it in the Panel de la Letra Oculta (Hidden Letter Puzzle) after correctly calling the Hidden Letter and solving the puzzle. The Super Comodín can be used (only once) as Comodín, Doble Letra or Ayuda Final.
- Me Lo Quedo (I'll Take It)
  - If the player claims the wedge, they can use it to steal all the money and wedges from one of their opponents.
- Empiezo Yo (I'll Start)
  - This wedge can only be used when starting a new puzzle. It allows the player who uses it to steal the turn to whoever had it and start the puzzle.
- Todas las Vocales (All the Vowels)
  - When used, all the vowels present on the puzzle are revealed for free.
- Premio (Prize)
  - A bonus prize, worth less than €500. The prize itself is displayed on the face-down side of the wedge. The player must solve the puzzle without hitting a Bankrupt to win it.
- Gran Premio (Great Prize)
  - A bonus prize divided into two adjacent wedges, similar to the "1/2 car" in the American wheel. The Great Prize is worth around €1000, more valuable than a regular Premio. The player has to claim both wedges and solve the puzzle without hitting a Bankrupt to win the Great Prize. If two different players get each a wedge, none of them would win it, unless one of them has the wedge "Me Lo Quedo" and steals the other wedge from the other player. As long as one of the wedges is still on the wheel, the other one is immune to the Bankrupt, and it will remain with the player puzzle after puzzle until both wedges are claimed or the game ends. If both have been claimed, they both will be lost once of the players owning one or both of them hits on a Bankrupt.
- Exprés (Express)
  - Works similar to the Express Wedge in the U.S., except that the round has a 45-second time limit. Players earn €50 for each consonant, and can buy vowels for €50, but the catch is that they must solve the puzzle before the clock expires, or they lose all their money and/or prizes. If a player gives a letter not in the puzzle, a bankruptcy is triggered: they also lose all their money and/or prizes (although they do not lose any special wedges such as "Ayuda Final.") Also, the player has to pick up the wedge off the wheel if they accept the challenge, meaning only one attempt in the whole show is allowed.
- Se lo Doy (I'll Give it to Them)
  - If a player lands on this wedge, they are forced to give all the money they had earned on the round as well as all of the wedges they had collected during the whole game to the one opponent of their choice. They don't lose the turn, though, and that opponent needs, as usual, to get the turn and solve the puzzle to win the given money, even though they kept the wedges.
- 3 por 100 (3 times 100)
  - Added in 2024. The player must call a correct consonant to lift this wedge. Then, they call three different consonants, earning €100 multiplied by all the times the letters appear on the puzzle.
- Quiebra/€1,000/Quiebra (Bankrupt/€1,000/Bankrupt)
  - Similar to the Bankrupt/$10,000/Bankrupt wedge in the U.S. (replaced by the million-dollar wedge). At first the €1,000 were treated like a flat amount which wouldn't be multiplied, later it was treated like regular cash, which means it would be multiplied by all the times the letter appeared on the puzzle. The wedge was also worth €1,500 on the 1,500th episode as well as €2,000 on the 2,000th show. On the "premium" edition from 2011, the wedge could be worth €10,000, €30,000, or €50,000. The Quiebra/€1,000/Quiebra wedge is replaced by the "Bote" wedge in the Jackpot Puzzle.
- Bote (Jackpot)
  - Only present in the last puzzle, the "Panel con Bote" (Jackpot Puzzle). During this puzzle, if a player lands on this wedge and solves the puzzle, he or she wins the jackpot, added to his or her score.
- Verano 300 (Summer €300)
  - Only present on the wheel in July and August. Works as a regular wedge.
- Vacaciones (Vacation)
  - Only present on the wheel in July and August. On the hidden side it can contain €500, €600, a Lose a Turn or a Bankrupt.
- Navidad (Christmas)
  - Only present on the wheel from December 1st to January 6th. Players start the show with a Duende de la Navidad (Christmas Elf), exchangeable for an extra Christmas gift in the Bonus Round, and lose it when they land in a Bankrupt. The Navidad wedge allows the player to recover the Duende de la Navidad if they had lost it previously.

Former wedges

- ?
  - A wedge with a question mark that acts as the Mystery Wedge. It hides either a random euro amount from €100 to €600 or any other bonus or penalty. At first, the host offered a fixed amount to the player for not going for the content of the wedge. More recently, they gave them three options of what the wedge could hide, a bonus (like a Free Spin or a "X2", one negative (a Bankrupt, a Lose Turn or a "1/2") and an amount of money, usually from 200 to 500 euros, which would be given flatly, not multiplied by how many times the consonant appeared.
