= Txumari Alfaro =

Spanish naturopath and television presenter (1952–2026)

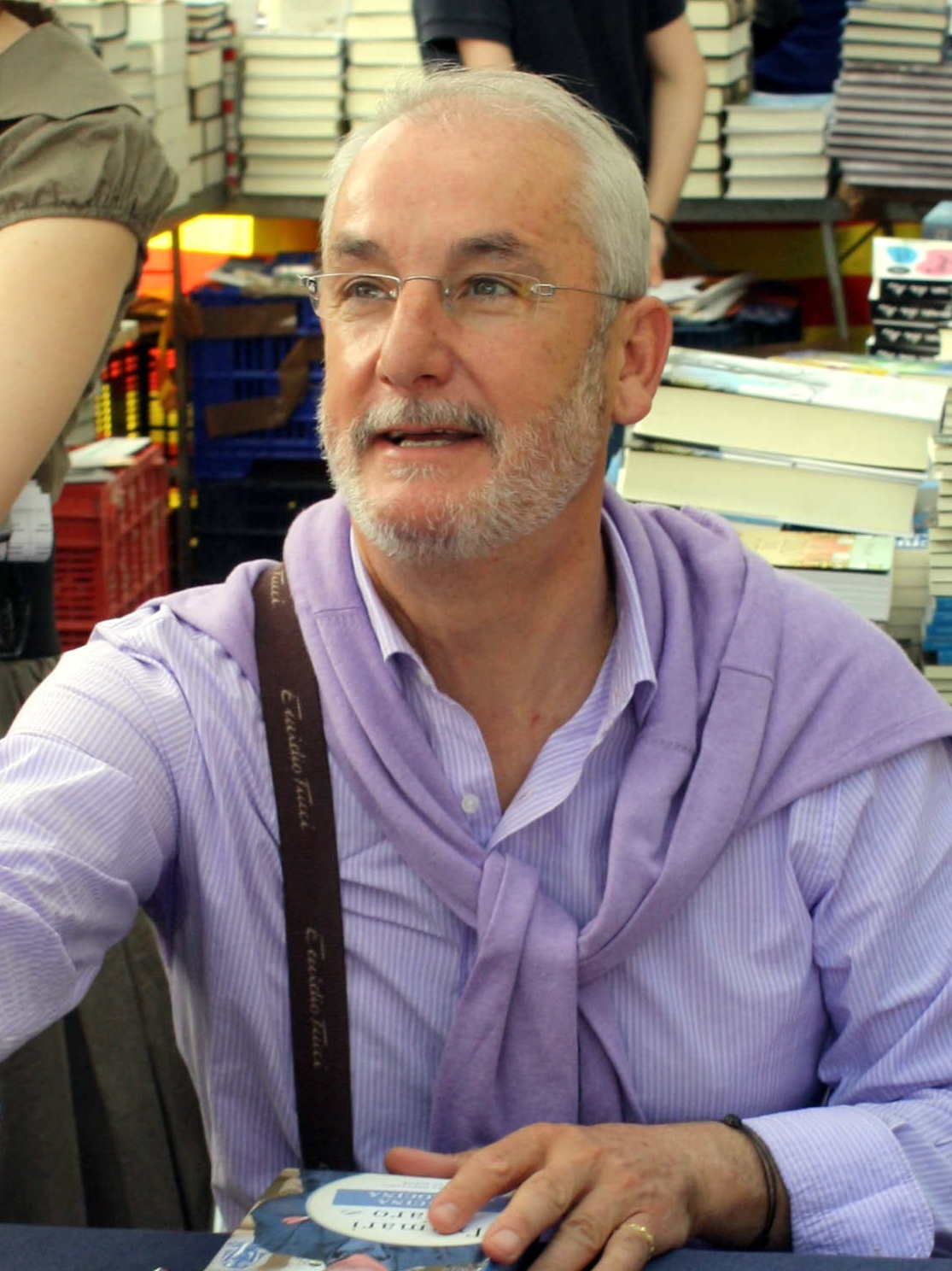
- Alfaro in 2009
- Born: 1952; Arguedas, Navarre, Spain
- Died: 18 April 2026 (aged 73); Pamplona, Navarre, Spain
- Occupations: Naturopath, television presenter, writer
- Known for: La botica de la abuela

Txumari Alfaro (1952 – 18 April 2026) was a Spanish television presenter, naturopath and writer from Navarre. He became known in Spain in the 1990s as the presenter of La botica de la abuela on Televisión Española. Later, he worked with other Spanish broadcasters, including Antena 3, Telecinco, and EITB.

== Life and career ==
Alfaro was born in Arguedas, Navarre in 1952. He later directed a naturist medical centre.

He gained recognition through La botica de la abuela, a television programme on TVE in which he gave traditional and household remedies for common ailments. In January 2000, his Antena 3 segment La botica de Txumari was spun off from Sabor a ti into an independent daily programme co-presented with Anabel Barrado. He later published books on health and natural remedies, including El gran libro de la vida sana.

In 2014, the Cofradía del Aceite de Navarra named him one of its new embajadores de honor.
