= José María Carrascal =

Spanish journalist and writer (1930–2023)

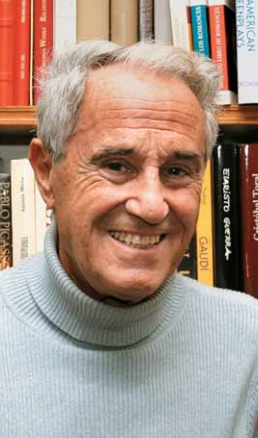
- Carrascal in 2006
- Born: 8 December 1930; El Vellón, Madrid, Spain
- Died: 4 November 2023 (aged 92); Madrid, Spain
- Occupations: Writer and journalist
- Writing career
- Genre: Novel

José María Carrascal Rodríguez (8 December 1930 – 3 November 2023) was a Spanish journalist and writer.

== Biography ==
José María Carrascal was born in El Vellón, Madrid, in 1930. He studied philosophy in Barcelona, and in 1959 he began his career as journalist out of Spain. Between 1959 and 1966 he was correspondent in Berlin, working for Diario de Barcelona and Pueblo. Then he moved to United States to begin his literary career, and he also worked for United Nations. He made an hiatus and in 1990 he got back to his activities and he became a columnist for La Razón. He wrote essays about American life and its idiosyncrasy.

For his novel Groovy he won the Nadal Prize in 1972.

In 2021 he won the Luca de Tena Award, and he died in Madrid on 3 November 2023, at the age of 92.
