= Pepe Carrol =

Spanish television presenter (1957–2004)

- Born: José Arsenio Franco Larraz; 17 September 1957; Calatayud, Aragon, Spain
- Died: 5 January 2004 (aged 46); Zaragoza, Aragon, Spain
- Occupations: Magician; Television personality
- Years active: 1990–2004
- Television: Genio y figura (1994); Sorpresa, ¡sorpresa! (1996–1999)

José Arsenio Franco Larraz, better known by his stage name Pepe Carrol (17 September 1957 – 5 January 2004), was a Spanish magician and TV personality.

== Biography ==
Carrol studied civil engineering, but dropped out to start his entertainment career. He started his trade in magic at the Asociación Mágica Aragonesa (AMA). He started out performing stage and illusionist magic, before transferring to circus-based tricks and parlour magic, his strong suits becoming sleight of hand and performing tricks with a deck of cards. He, like other contemporaneous magicians such as Juan Tamariz and Arturo de Ascanio, followed the magic format espoused by the Magic School of Madrid.

Carrol came to fame in the early 1990s, when he joined the cast of TVE game show Un, dos, tres... responda otra vez. He later swapped to Antena 3, where he presented his own show Genio y figura and A quién se lo ocurre and also partnered with Concha Velasco on Encantada de vida and Sorpresa, ¡sorpresa!, the Spanish version of Surprise Surprise. On Tele 5, he worked on Aquí no hay quien duerma and Vaya nochecita, the Spanish remake of Noel's House Party. On all these shows he used a similar structure, combining magic, humour and his stage presence.

He stopped working in TV in his later years but continued to perform on stage and for parties, winning national and international awards for his magic. He wrote two books about his craft, the successful Cincuenta y dos amantes in 1988 and a follow-up 52 amantes a través del espejo, published posthumously.

Affected by the deaths of his mother and partner Laura, Carrol's health worsened until his death in 2004 of a heart attack. In 2020, a documentary directed by fellow magician Carlos Devanti, based on an article about his life by writer Ramón Mayrata, was produced to celebrate Carrol's magic.
