= Silvia Jato =

Spanish TV presenter and model (born 1971)

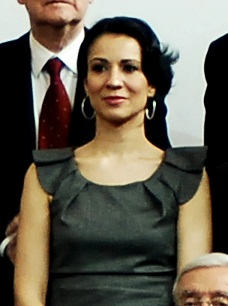
- Born: Silvia Jato Núñez; 6 June 1971 (age 55); Lugo, Spain
- Education: CEU San Pablo University
- Occupations: TV presenter, Model
- Years active: 1990-present

Silvia Jato Núñez (born 6 June 1971 in Lugo, Spain) is a Spanish TV presenter and model.

She studied Economics at CEU San Pablo University, Madrid. She had three children with pilot Eduardo San Román, from whom she separated in 2012, after being married to him since 1998.

She began as a model, and took part in Miss Spain in 1989 (being Maid of Honour) and in Miss Europe in 1991 (being Maid of Honour, Miss Photogenic and Miss Sympathy).

As a TV presenter she was nominated for prizes including TP de Oro (2001, 2002, 2003) and Premios ATV (2003, 2004).

== Television programs ==
- 1990:"Sabor a ti" TVG (Galician Autonomous Television)
- 1991:"Sabor 92", TVG
- 1991:"Gala pro-Bosnia", TVG
- 1991:"Gala Santiago de Compostela, Capital Cultural Europea del año 2000", TVG
- 1995:"Gala moda Pazo de Mariñán", TVG
- 1995-1996: "Pasarela de Estrellas", TVG
- 1996:"Gala de Nochevieja", Antena 3 Televisión
- 1996:"Gala moda Pazo de Mariñán", TVG
- 1997:En Antena, Antena 3: with Inés Ballester.
- 1997:Noche de Impacto, Antena 3: with Carlos García Hirschfeld.
- 1999-2000: Mírame, Antena 3
- 2000-2005: Pasapalabra, Antena 3
- 2004:Pelopicopata, Antena 3
- 2004:Los Más, Antena 3, with Arturo Valls.
- 2005:Gala de Nochevieja, Antena 3
- 2006:"¡Allá tú!", Telecinco, replacing Jesús Vázquez.
- 2007: Por la mañana, TVE, replacing Inés Ballester.
- 2007: contestant of El club de Flo, La Sexta.
- 2008: Fifty Fifty, Cuatro
