= Isabel Gemio =

Spanish journalist and radio and television presenter (born 1961)

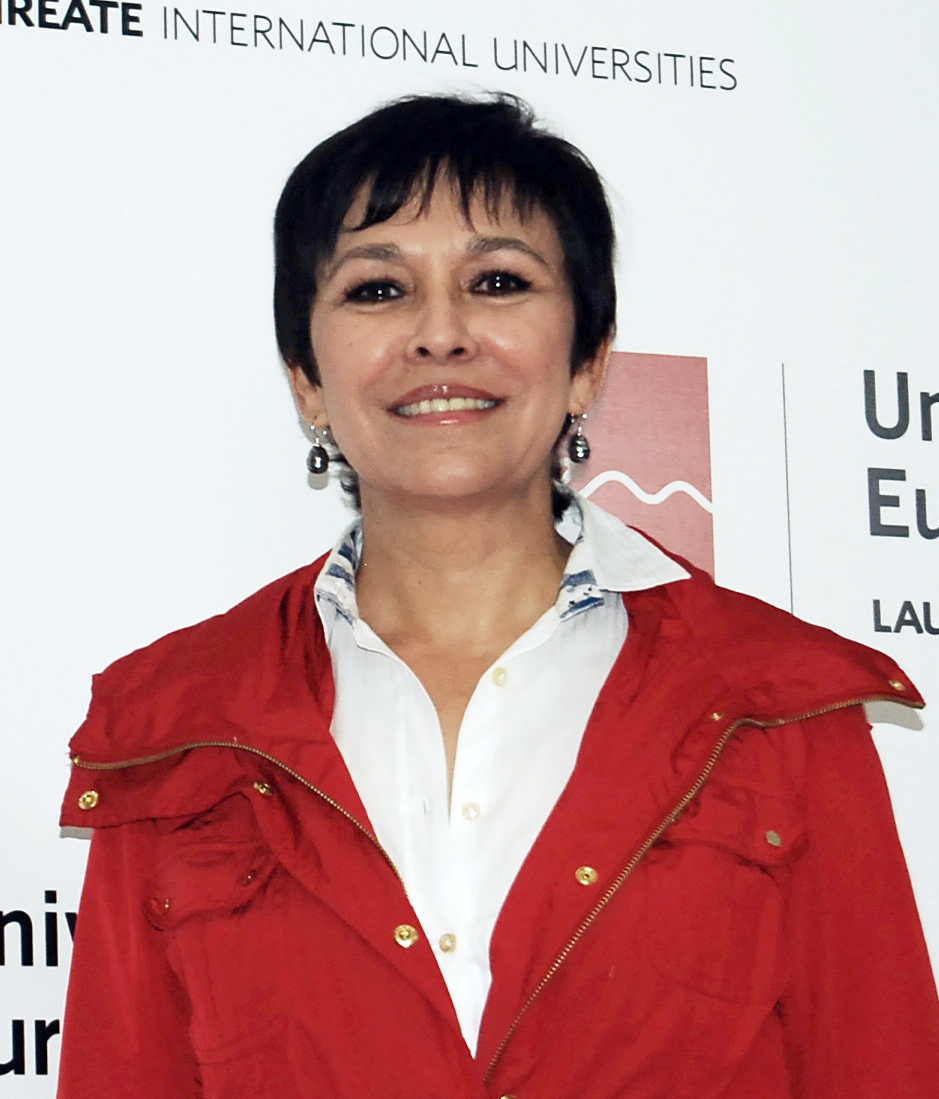
- Gemio in 2012
- Born: Isabel Gemio Cardoso; 5 January 1961 (age 65); Alburquerque, Badajoz, Spain
- Occupation: Journalist
- Years active: 1983–2008

Isabel Gemio Cardoso (born 5 January 1961) is a Spanish journalist and radio and television presenter. She was married to a Cuban sculptor (Julio Nilo Manrique Roldán) and has a biological son and an adopted son.

She started in Radio Extremadura, and later in Radio Barcelona as Isabel Garbí. Her debut in television was in 1983 with the TVE quiz show Los Sabios.

== Prizes ==
- TP de Oro (1994) Best Conductor, Lo que necesitas es amor.
- TP de Oro (1996) Best Conductor, Sorpresa ¡Sorpresa!.
- Garbanzo de Plata (1996).
- ':Micrófono de Plata': (2005), Te doy mi palabra.
- Antena de Oro (2006), Te doy mi palabra.

== TV ==
- Los Sabios (1983–1984) TVE.
- Tal Cual (TVE) (1989) TVE.
- 3X4 (1989–1990) TVE.
- Arco de Triunfo (1991) TVE.
- Juegos sin fronteras (1991) TVE.
- Acompáñame (1992) TVE.
- Lo que necesitas es amor (1993–1994) Antena 3.
- Esta noche, sexo (1995) Antena 3.
- Hoy por ti (1996) Antena 3.
- Sorpresa ¡Sorpresa! (1996–1998) Antena 3.
- Hablemos claro (1999–2000) Canal Sur.
- Noche y día (2001) Antena 3.
- De buena mañana (2002) Antena 3.
- Hay una carta para ti (2002–2004) Antena 3.
- Sorpresa ¡Sorpresa! (2007) Antena 3.
- Cuéntaselo a Isabel (2008-2009) Canal Extremadura TV.
- Todos somos raros, todos somos únicos (2014) TVE.

== Radio ==
- Radio Extremadura
- Radio Barcelona: La chica de la radio, Cita a las cinco, El Diván...
- Cadena Rato
- Radio Nacional de España
