= Patricia Gaztañaga =

Spanish television broadcaster

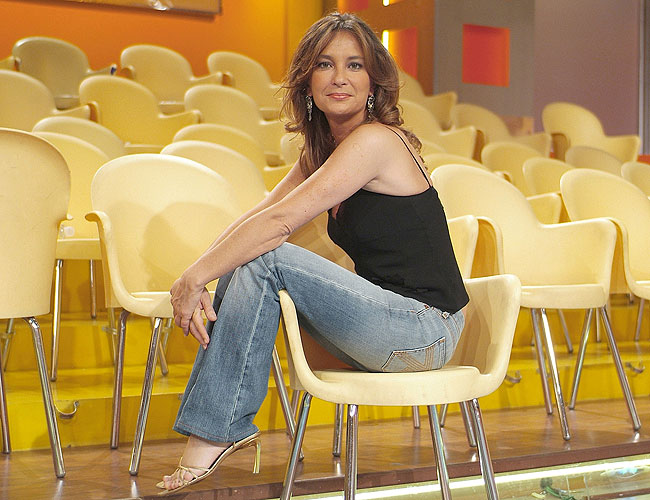
- Gaztañaga in 2007
- Born: Patricia Jesusa Gaztañaga Artolozaga; 25 December 1966 (age 58); Bilbao, Spain
- Occupation: Television broadcaster
- Years active: 1984–2016
- Spouse: Iñaki Solaun
- Children: 2

Patricia Jesusa Gaztañaga Artolozaga (born 25 December 1966) is a Spanish retired television broadcaster. She began her media career broadcasting the Los 40 Principales radio programme when she was 17 years old and went on to join the Basque regional public service broadcaster EITB, presenting multiple programmes for it. Gaztañaga presented more than 1,500 episodes of the weekday Antena 3 afternoon show Patricia's Diary between 2001 and 2008 as well as other various short-lived programmes on the channel. She returned to EITB for three years from 2012 to 2015 and her final work in television before her retirement from the industry came with RTVE in 2016.

== Biography ==
On 25 December 1966, Gaztañaga was born in Bilbao. When she was 17 years old, she began her career in broadcasting when she did the Los 40 Principales radio programme. Gaztañaga signed a contract to work as a journalist at the Radio Euskadi network two years later. She later joined the Basque regional public broadcaster Euskal Telebista (EITB) where her television career commenced presenting the youth music programme Semáforo Pop. Following her participation on multiple programmes on EITB, she became regionally known for presenting Ésta es mi gente, a programme in which participants provided testimonies and the show became popular in the Basque Country, Gaztañaga also presented the evening debating programme Toma y daca with José Gordejuela from 1995 to 1997 on ETB 2, Al cabo de la calle with Jose Ignacio Rejón on the same television channel in 1997. and Números rojos.

In July 2001, Gaztañaga began presenting the weekday Antena 3 afternoon programme Patricia's Diary. This made her the person who was most associated with Antena 3 in Spain. She presented the afternoon television magazine programme Menta y chocolate in 2003, discussing social topics and the day's news. Two years later, Gaztañaga made a cameo appearance in the series Aquí no hay quien viva in which she presented Patricia's Diary. She made the decision to take some time off Patricia's Diary starting in November 2006 due to her being on maternity leave. She was replaced by Yolanda Vázquez for two months. She returned to presenting Patricia's Diary in February 2007, and had hosted more than 1,500 editions of the programme by the following year. Gaztañaga made her final on-screen appearance on the programme on 9 July 2008. She said in an interview that she had wanted to conclude her involvement on the show to enable her to do other projects. Gaztañaga further stated that the murder of a Russian woman days after she rejected a marriage proposal by her male partner on Patricia's Diary had no bearing on her decision to leave the programme.

In September 2008, Gaztañaga began hosting the Antena 3 live debating programme No es programa para viejo for Spain's youth and topics such as their education, housing, relationships with their friends and parents and their future in the Labour market were discussed. The programme was cancelled by Antena 3 the following month due to low ratings. In 2010, she presented the reality television programme Bodas Cruzadas on Cuatro which saw women provided the opportunity to marry their male partners. In September of that year, Gaztañaga hosted the Antena 3 reality show El marco in which eight couples resided in a small space. The programme was cancelled ten days following the broadcast of its first episode.

Due to the low ratings of the programmes she had presented, she returned to regional Basque television by rejoining ETB in 2012 and remaining at the broadcaster until 2015. Gaztañaga was the presenter of the short-lived afternoon weekday two-team competition Voy a mil in 2012. The following year, she presented Ongi Etorri that focused on Basque houses and the lifestyle of their owners and ¿Y ahora qué? in which convinced criminals recalled negative experiences. In May 2015, she began working as the broadcaster of the morning news magazine Como en casa en ningún sitio on ETB 2. In September 2015, she signed with RTVE to present the weekday reality entertainment show Cuestión de tiempo on La 1 in which contestants kept a special item in a box that was given to the person of their selection and the programme travelled to major Spanish settlements. Gaztañaga's role in the programme was to introduce the contestants to each other and the programme debuted on 8 February 2016. The programme was cancelled following the broadcast of nine episodes because of poor ratings.

She retired from working in television in 2016 after three decades. Gaztañaga established two advertising companies with her husband to develop activities within the world of the advertising industry and to conduct television programming and broadcast activities. She does not plan to return to the television industry, and takes part in anti-Animal abuse campaigns.

== Personal life ==
Married to Iñaki Solaun, Gaztañaga has two children.
