= Roberto Leal (TV presenter) =

Spanish journalist and television presenter

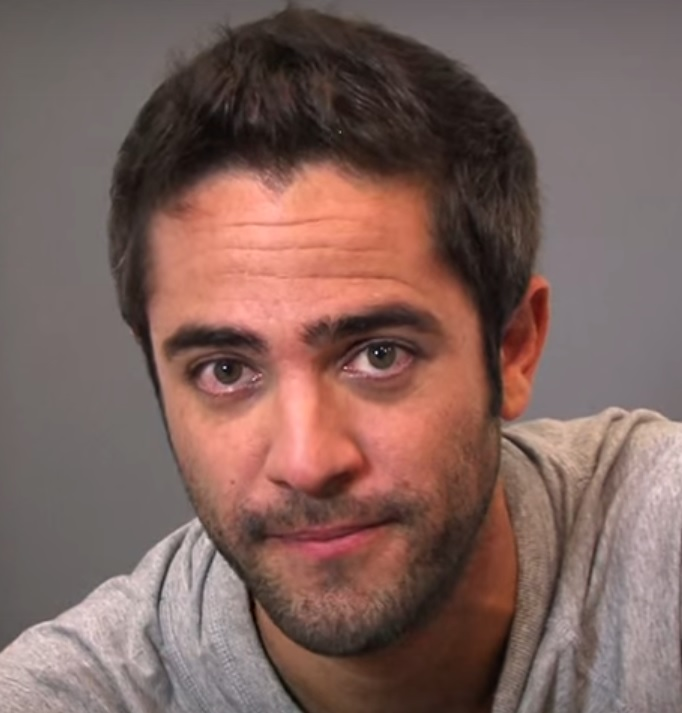
- Born: Roberto José Leal Guillén; 28 June 1979 (age 46); Alcalá de Guadaíra, Spain
- Education: Bachelor's in Journalism, Faculty of Communication of Seville, 1999. Master's in Journalism, University of Seville, 2003.
- Occupations: Television presenter, reporter, journalist
- Spouse: Sara Rubio (2015–present)
- Parents: Pepe Leal (father); Mercedes Guillén (mother)
- Website: http://www.robertoleal.es

Roberto José Leal Guillén (born 28 June 1979) is a Spanish television presenter, reporter and journalist.

== Biography ==
Roberto Leal was born in Alcalá de Guadaíra, Seville on 28 June 1979. He graduated in Journalism at the University of Seville. He was a journalist at the newspaper La Voz de Alcalá, and the host of the radio program La Resaca, on Sevilla FM.

In 2001, aged 21 he began his television career working on Informativos Telecinco as the editor for his native Andalusia. After working at Canal Sur and as a news reporter on María Teresa Campos' show on Antena 3, from 2005 to 2010 Leal was a reporter on the news discussion show show España directo, on La 1. In 2010 he co-hosted the short-lived 3D alongside Gloria Serra on Antena 3. In the following four years, Leal continued in Antena 3 co-hosting the morning television show Espejo Público, alongside Susanna Griso. On 15 September 2014, he returned to host España directo as the main anchor, which he hosted until 2 November 2018.

From 2014 until 2016 he hosted the Sorteo Extraordinario on TVE, and from 2015 to 2017 presented coverage of the Cavalcade of Magi on the network. This allowed him to swap from journalism to light entertainment programming, becoming a surprise choice for the 2017 reboot of Operación Triunfo. The show was a massive success and made Leal a light entertainment star. Leal hosted then hosted a revival of Bailando con las estrellas, the Spanish adaptation of Dancing with the Stars, alongside Rocío Muñoz Morales, however it lasted just one series. Leal presented the annual New Year's Eve broadcast on TVE live from Madrid's Puerta del Sol, alongside Anne Igartiburu. In 2019, Leal hosted the music show La mejor canción jamás cantada and the game show Vaya crack.

In 2020, Leal jumped ship back to Antena 3 to host the game shows Pasapalabra and El desafío, while his new network allowed him to finish hosting the current series of Operación Triunfo. He temporarily left Pasapalabra on 31 August 2020 after testing positive for COVID-19 during the pandemic, but returned after two weeks. Since 2021, he has also hosted the Spanish version of Lego Masters. Since 2023/24 he has hosted Antena 3's annual New Year's Eve gala, Adiós 20xx, replacing Juanra Bonet.

== Personal life ==
Leal is married to Sara Rubio, whom he met while working on Espejo Público. In 2017 they had their first child, named Lola.

His father Pepe Leal died on 27 December 2019.

== Awards and honors ==
In July 2018 he received the Premio Andalucía del Turismo.

In 2019, a street in his hometown of Alcalá de Guadaíra was named after him.
