= Jesús Hermida =

Spanish journalist (1937–2015)

The Most Excellent Jesús Hermida OAXS
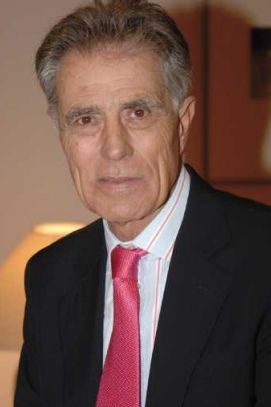
- Hermida in 2007
- Born: Jesús Hermida Pineda; 27 June 1937; Huelva, Spain
- Died: 4 May 2015 (aged 77); Madrid, Spain
- Occupation: Journalist

Jesús Hermida Pineda OAXS (27 June 1937 – 4 May 2015) was a Spanish journalist. He worked as a U.S. correspondent for Televisión Española in New York City, New York.

Hermida was born Huelva. He died from a stroke in Madrid, at the age of 77.

== Honours ==
- Knight Grand Cross of the Civil Order of Alfonso X, the Wise (Posthumous, Kingdom of Spain, 9 October 2015).
