= Inés Ballester =

Spanish journalist

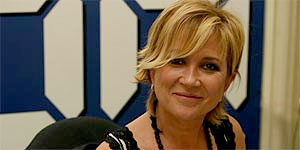
- Born: María Inés Ballester Muñoz; 28 September 1958 (age 67); Borriana, Castellón, Spain
- Education: Autonomous University of Barcelona
- Occupations: Journalist, presenter
- Spouses: Rafael Corberó (divorced); Juan Luis Ruiz de Gauna Peláez
- Awards: Antena de Oro (2005)

María Inés Ballester Muñoz (born 28 September 1958) is a Spanish journalist and presenter.

== Biography ==
With a licentiate in Journalism from the Autonomous University of Barcelona, Inés Ballester started her career at Cadena SER, and later went on to the daily magazine of Radio Nacional de España. After a few years she made the leap to television, first at the territorial center of Televisión Española (TVE) in Valencia, as head of programs, and then on Nou and Telemadrid. After three years on Telemadrid, she was signed to Antena 3 in 1997. In 2001 she returned to TVE where she presented the morning program Por la mañana, along with Iñaki del Moral, for six seasons. It was canceled in March 2008.

Shortly afterward, Ballester joined another morning show at La 1, in this case on weekends, under the title El día por delante, which premiered on 24 May 2008. The program was canceled on 2 August, however, after accumulating a ratings share of 11.3%, below the network's average.

From January to December 2010 she co-presented the program Cine de barrio on La 1, together with Carmen Sevilla.

Since 2009 she has contributed to the program Julia en la onda on Onda Cero, together with Julia Otero.

In October 2011 she joined the 13TV network, presenting the daily magazine Te damos la mañana. A year later she premiered the program Nuestro cine on the same channel. Her contractual relationship with the chain ended in November 2017.

Ballester has written cookbooks entitled Cocina con corazón, Cocina con más Corazón, and Cocina cada día con corazón, all with the publisher Temas de Hoy, which include some of the best recipes from her TV programs.

In the summer of 2012, she was diagnosed with breast cancer, for which she received surgical treatment at the Jiménez Díaz Foundation University Hospital. In March 2017 she publicly announced that she was cancer-free.

From 7 July 2014 to 1 September 2014, Ballester took over La mañana de Verano, covering during the vacation of Mariló Montero.

Since 2 September 2014, she has presented Amigas y conocidas on La 1. The 18 February 2015 edition of this program generated controversy by giving publicity to a false photo of the Podemos candidate for the Presidency of the Government of Andalusia together with a nude woman.

In spring 2020, Ballester was admitted to the hospital after falling severely ill during the COVID-19 pandemic.

== Television ==
- Te'n recordes?, on Nou (1992–1993)
- Sucedió en Madrid, on Telemadrid (1994–1997)
- En Antena, on Antena 3 (1997–1998)
- Ver para creer, on Antena 3 (1999), together with Liborio García
- Sabor a verano, on Antena 3 (1999)
- El bus, on Antena 3 (2000)
- Ay, mi madre, on La 1 (2001)
- Flashback, on several FORTA channels: Canal Sur, Telemadrid, Televisión Canaria, and Nou (2002)
- Por la mañana, on La 1 (2002–2008)
- El día por delante, on La 1 (2008)
- Cine de barrio, on La 1 (2010), co-presenter
- Sin ir más lejos, on Aragón TV (2009-2011), contributor
- Saca la lengua, on La 2 (2011)
- Te damos la mañana, on 13TV (2011–2012)
- Nuestro cine, on 13TV (2012–2017)
- La mañana de Verano, on La 1 (2014)
- Amigas y conocidas, on La 1 (2014–2018)
- Amigas y conocidas, Lazos de Sangre, on La 1 (June–September 2018)

== Books ==
- Cocina con corazón (2006). Temas de Hoy. ISBN 978-84-8460-549-2.
- Cocina con más corazón (2006). Temas de Hoy. ISBN 978-84-8460-602-4.
- Cocina cada día con corazón (2007). Temas de Hoy. ISBN 978-84-8460-637-6.
- Cocina cada día con corazón (2008). Temas de Hoy. ISBN 978-84-8460-532-4.

== Awards ==
- Antena de Oro (2005), in the Television category, for her work hosting the program Por la mañana
