= Jaime Cantizano =

Spanish television and radio presenter

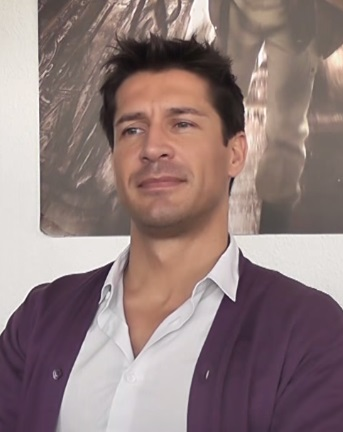
- Born: Jaime Cantizano Camacho; 22 July 1973 (age 52); Jerez de la Frontera (Cádiz), Spain
- Occupations: Television presenter, radio presenter
- Years active: 1990–present
- Children: Leo

Jaime Cantizano Camacho (born 22 July 1973 in Jerez de la Frontera, Cádiz, Andalusia, Spain) is a Spanish television and radio presenter.

== Career ==
At 17 years old, Cantizano started his career in radio broadcasting as a speaker in his hometown's Los 40 Principales station where he also voiced commercials; from there he passed to the regional Cadena SER station and afterwards to Onda Cero. In parallel to his work in radio, he collaborated with newspaper El Correo de Andalucía.

In 2001, Cantizano debuted in television in local channel Localia Televisión, hosting a morning show together with Concha Galán. In 2002 he was hired by nationwide channel Antena 3 to co-host Ana Rosa Quintana's talk show Sabor a ti.

In 2003, the channel offered him to host weekly prime time talk show ¿Dónde estás corazón?, which focused on the private lives of celebrities. Despite the show attracting criticism and being characterised as tabloid television, it aired until September 2011, conducted by Cantizano.

During the summer of 2006, Cantizano hosted daily quiz show Pasapalabra. From September 2006 to June 2007, Cantizano presented daily talk show En Antena, which was replaced in September 2007 by talk show A3Bandas, also hosted by Cantizano together with María Patiño and Dani Martínez. The show was retired in 2008. In 2008, Cantizano hosted, together with Aitor Trigos and Eva González, reality television series Tres deseos, the Spanish adaptation of Three Wishes.

In the summer of 2012, Cantizano conducted music game show Dando la nota. In October 2012, Cantizano finished his contract with Antena 3.

From September 2013 to June 2017, Cantizano presented radio breakfast show Atrévete, on Cadena Dial.

In 2014, Cantizano worked for Televisión Española (TVE) for the first time hosting the ninth season of Mira quién baila, the Spanish version of Dancing with the Stars. In 2017, Cantizano hosted Objetivo Eurovisión, the Spanish national final to select the Spanish entry for the Eurovision Song Contest 2017. From March 2017 to May 2017 he also hosted Jugando con las estrellas, the Spanish version of Big Star's Little Star.

In October 2017 Cantizano was hired by Onda Cero to present its weekend morning radio show.

== Personal life ==
On 28 July 2016, Cantizano became the father of Leo, born by a surrogate mother in California, United States.
