= Paula Vázquez =

Spanish television presenter (born 1974)

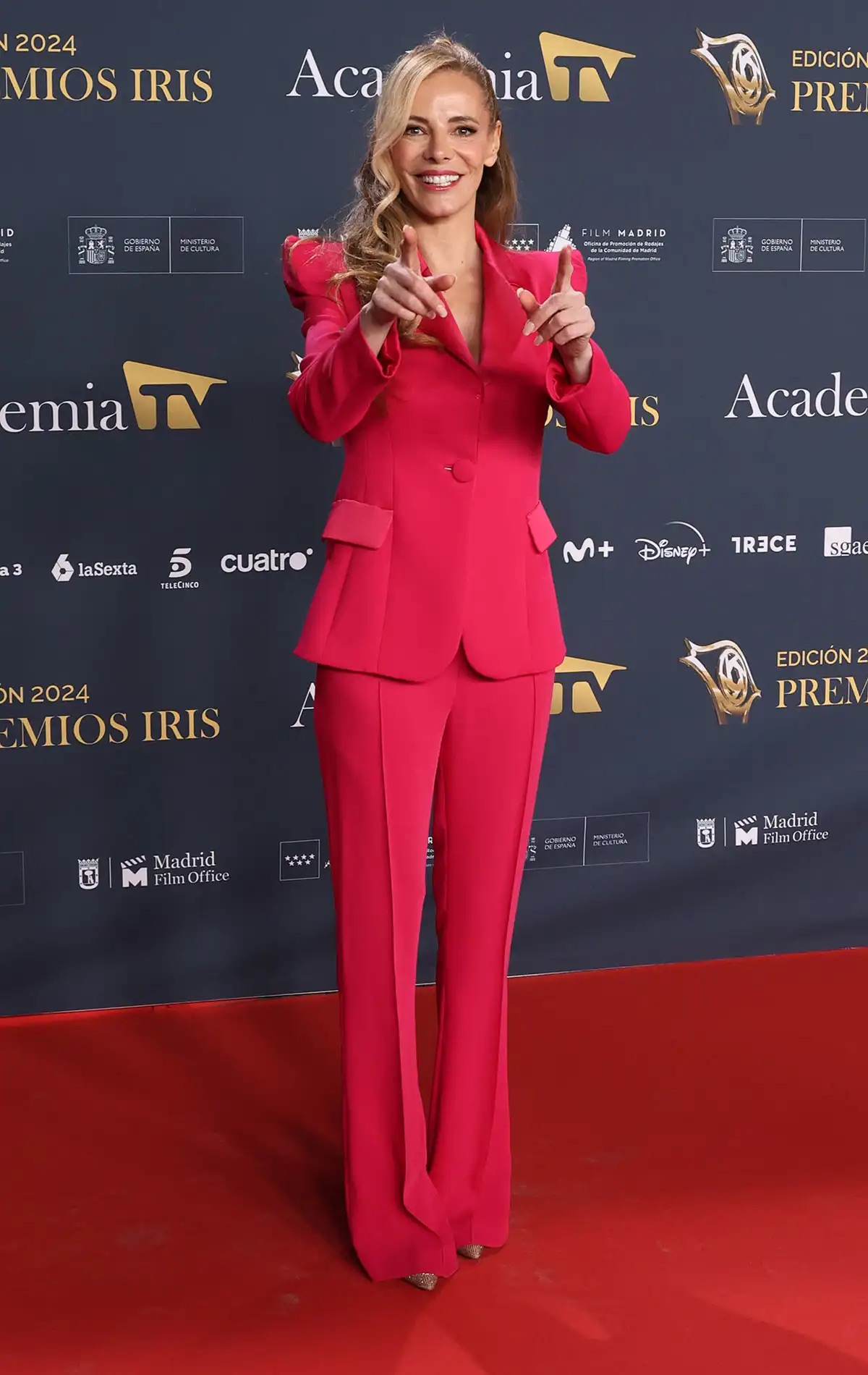
- At the 26th Iris Awards in 2025
- Born: Paula Vázquez Picallo; 26 November 1974 (age 51); Ferrol (Corunna), Spain
- Occupation(s): Television presenter, model, actress
- Website: http://www.paulavazquez.com/

Paula Vázquez Picallo (born 26 November 1974) is a Spanish television presenter, also known for her modelling career in the fashion industry.

She was born at Ferrol, Galicia.

== Career ==
- Un, dos, tres... responda otra vez (1993–1994), Televisión Española.
- La vuelta a la fama (1994), Televisión Española.
- No te olvides el cepillo de dientes (1994), Antena 3.
- Luar (1995), Televisión de Galicia.
- El rastrillo (1995), Antena 3.
- Sonrisas de España (1996), Antena 3.
- Mira quién viene esta noche (1997), Antena 3.
- La parodia nacional (1997–1998), Antena 3.
- Inocente, inocente (1998), Telecinco.
- El juego del euromillón (1998–2001), Telecinco.
- Fort Boyard (2001), Telecinco.
- Gran Hermano (2002), Telecinco.
- Mira tú por dónde (2002), Antena 3.
- El gran test (2002), Antena 3.
- Por ti (2003), Antena 3.
- La isla de los famosos (2003–2005), Antena 3.
- Los más (2005–2006), Antena 3.
- Misión Eurovisión 2007 (2007), Televisión Española.
- Fama ¡A Bailar! (2008–2010), Cuatro; (2018–2019), #0.
- Pekín Express (2008), Cuatro.
- El Número Uno (2012), Antena 3.
- El almacén de Top Chef (2013), Antena 3.
- Campanadas 2013–2014 (2013), Antena 3.
- Especial 25 aniversario (2015), Antena 3.
- El Puente (2017–2018), #0.
- Ultimate Beastmaster (2017), Netflix.
- Celebrity Bake Off España (2021–), Amazon Prime Video, Televisión Española.
- Benidorm Fest 2025, Televisión Española.

== Accolades ==
- Antena de Oro (2004) in the category of Televisión, for La isla de los famosos.
- Nominated to a TP de Oro as 'Best Female Presenter' for "El Juego del Euromillón" in 1998, 1999, and 2000.
