= Pasapalabra =

Spanish TV game show

- Genre: Game show
- Based on: The Alphabet Game by: Rebecca Thornhill; Mark Maxwell-Smith; Andrew O'Connor
- Presented by: Silvia Jato; Constantino Romero; Jaime Cantizano; Christian Gálvez; Roberto Leal; Manel Fuentes
- Composers: Miguel Ángel Tudela (2007-2018); Federico Vaona (2018-2019)
- Country of origin: Spain
- Original language: Spanish

Production
- Running time: 43 minutes
- Production companies: ITV Studios Iberia (2009-2010, 2020-present); BocaBoca (2000-2009); Xanela Producciones (2009-2019); Buendía Estudios (2020-2022); Boomerang TV (2021-2024)

Original release
- Network: Antena 3
- Release: 24 July 2000 – 16 June 2006
- Network: Telecinco
- Release: 16 July 2007 – 1 October 2019
- Network: Antena 3
- Release: 13 May 2020 – present

Pasapalabra is a Spanish television game show, adapted from the British format The Alphabet Game. The title is a portmanteau of the Spanish verb pasar, "pass", and palabra, literally "word".

== Gameplay ==
In each episode, two contestants team with celebrities (usually, one male and one female celebrity per team) to play various games. A team's correct responses in these games score seconds, extending their contestant's time limit in the final game, el rosco final, or el rosco, or, since 2026, "AlaZ", from the Swiss game show DallAZetA.

There are four rounds of gameplay prior to the rosco. All of them begin with the female celebrity, who sits to the contestant's right.

- One of Four (Uno de cuatro)

In this round, players are given four options to choose from, then asked a series of questions, usually built around a theme (e.g. musicians, actors, countries, animals, etc.). A correct answer scores two seconds and removes that option from the board, which is then replaced by a new one; therefore, there are always four options for each question. An incorrect answer removes the correct one from the board and play passes to the next player on the team; players cannot pass without a guess. The players must answer as many questions as they can in 75 seconds.

- Music Round (La pista musical)

Players go head-to-head against their opposite on the other team to identify a popular song; the two female celebrity guests go first, followed by the two contestants, and finally the two male celebrity guests. The host reveals the year in which the song was first released (though in some cases, they listen to a cover version, in which case the host will tell them the year in which the cover was released); a short snippet of the song is then played, and if the player can identify it correctly, they earn the contestant five seconds. A player may buzz in at any time after the music begins, and buzzing in does not stop the music; therefore, players will usually try to buzz in immediately when the music starts (though buzzing in too soon, before the music actually starts, results in a lost turn).

If neither player can guess the song, the host then reads a line from the lyrics (which are usually in Spanish or English, though occasionally in Italian or French); identifying the song from this earns four seconds. If not, another snippet is played, worth three seconds.

For two seconds, several options are possible: either the host reads the title with the words out of order; conveys the title using synonyms for the actual words; or, if the title is in a language other than Spanish, reads a translation of the title into Spanish, which the players must translate correctly.

If the players still do not know the song, a final snippet of music is played, worth one second; if neither knows by the end of this round, no seconds are scored, and play advances to the next pair.

The songs are generally popular songs from music history, though sometimes they are themes from film or TV series, or children's songs. In these cases, this fact is revealed at the beginning, rather than the year of the song.

- Crossed Words (Palabras Cruzadas)

Players are presented with a total of nine words. Each word is split in half and randomly placed into one of two rows. The players are given a theme; they must then match the two halves to complete the word based on the description of the word. For every complete grid, contestants earn two seconds.

An incorrect answer passes to the next player. Since there are nine words, the player can win up to 18 seconds.

- Where are they? (¿Dónde estan?)

Players are shown a grid of nine words, all revolving around a theme. They are only shown the words for a few seconds and must try to remember as many as possible, before the grid is replaced by numbers. The clock then starts at 75 seconds, and the host reads the words on the grid in random order; players must state which number the word is behind. Correct answers reveal the word and the host reads the next; incorrect answers reset the grid and the words are hidden again.

If a player correctly finds all nine words in a single play, the contestant locks in 10 seconds. If both teams find all the words on their respective grids, each contestant earns 10 seconds; if only one team does so, that contestant earns 20 seconds. If neither team finds all nine words, the team who found the most earns 5 seconds; if there is a tie, each earns 5 seconds.

- Final round (El rosco) (Until 18 June 2026)

In the rosco, each contestant is given 85 seconds in addition to the seconds they have accumulated in the previous rounds. Play proceeds through letters of the Spanish alphabet, except K and W: for each letter, the host reads a definition of a word starting with it (or, in the case of Ñ, Q, X, and Y, containing the letter). A contestant responds with a word, or passes by saying "pasapalabra". After a pass or an incorrect answer, play moves to the other contestant; each player's rosco contains one answer on which the host elaborates, usually with a brief explanation of the word's etymology. Completing the rosco with every response correct wins the show's progressive jackpot.

Once a player has heard all the definitions, they usually immediately pass to skip letters they have not answered to avoid losing time while they try to think of an answer (though no matter how fast they pass, one second is always deducted per turn). If a player wishes, they can say nothing and let their time run out.

If a player does not win the jackpot, they win €1,200 if they answer more correct than their opponent, or if each has the same number correct but their opponent has more incorrect responses (For example, if Player A has answered 22 correct and has no incorrect answers, while Player B also has 22 correct but one incorrect, Player A would be the winner) (faltas); In the event of a tie on both correct and incorrecr answers (If any), each player wins €600. Therefore, a player can come away with a sum of money from their time on the show, even if they never win the jackpot.

- Final round (AlaZ (DallAZetA)) (From 19 June 2026)

This final round works in similar fashion to "El Rosco", but this time around each contestant is given 110 seconds plus anything they have accumulated in the previous rounds. The contestant with the most time (or the orange team if both teams have the same number of seconds) must decide if they go forward through the alphabet or backwards (That person will receive the first choice, while the second will be assigned by default), the letters are now shown in a row, while blanks indicate the number of letters in the answer. In addition to passing, a contestant can also call "Letter" to reveal one of the letters in the correct answer, but this deducts five seconds from the contestant's time and they're allowed to do it once per word.

If a player does not win the jackpot, they win €1,200 if they answer more correct than their opponent, or if each has the same number correct but their opponent has more incorrect responses. In the event of a tie on both correct and incorrecr answers (If any), each player wins €600.

== History ==
Pasapalabra first aired on Antena 3 in 2000, with Silvia Jato as host. Constantino Romero substituted Jato in 2002. Jaime Cantizano replaced Jato as host in 2006.

In 2006, a Pasapalabra jackpot of €2,190,000 became the largest prize ever awarded on a game show in Spain, and the third largest prize ever awarded on a game show in Europe.

In 2007, Pasapalabra moved to Telecinco with Christian Gálvez as host. Pasapalabra aired evenings on Telecinco, Monday through Friday.

In 2014, Lilit Manukyan of Armenia became the first Pasapalabra jackpot winner whose native language was not Spanish.

On 2 October 2019, the programme was pulled by Telecinco, following a ruling by the Supreme Court of Spain in favour of ITV Studios in a royalty dispute over the rights to the Pasapalabra format. While initially adapted from the British panel game show The Alphabet Game, Mediaset argued that the format had evolved substantially to include elements (such as the endgame) that were not included in the original format, to the point that it believed ITV were no longer entitled to royalties. However, the court ruled otherwise. Telecinco briefly replaced the programme with its own original format, El tirón, which was also hosted by Gálvez.

On 19 December 2019, Antena 3 announced that it would revive Pasapalabra. Roberto Leal took on hosting duties, with Manel Fuentes filling in for him for two episodes while he was quarantined after contracting COVID-19.

On 28 February 2021, a special 20th anniversary episode aired with former hosts Silvia Jato and Jaime Cantizano as guest contestants.

On 1 July 2021, Pablo Díaz won a jackpot of nearly €2,000,000, after a record run of 260 consecutive episodes.

On 19 May 2026, the Supreme Court of Spain upheld a ruling by the Provincial Court of Barcelona ordering Atresmedia to cease broadcasting the final round El Rosco, after determining that it constituted a work protected by intellectual property rights owned by MC&F Broadcasting Production and Distribution C.V. After all remaining episodes featuring El Rosco were broadcast, on 19 June 2026 the show premiered AlaZ as its replacement. The final round was eventually sold to Telecinco, which made a new game show, Rueda la letra.

== List of El Rosco winners ==
Date	Name of contestant	Win (Euros)	Win (Pesetas)	Notes
10 September 2000	Juan Campoy Armero	€60,101.21	10.000.000 ₧	First but smallest win of the first Antena 3 era.
24 November 2000	Gabriel García	€168,283.39	28.000.000 ₧	
January 2001	José Manuel Dorado	€150,253.03	25.000.000 ₧	
February 2001	Alberto Martínez Pellicer	€132,222.26	22.000.000 ₧	
March 2001	Joseba Molina	€126,212.54	21.000.000 ₧	
19 June 2001	Josep Badia	€240,404.84	40.000.000 ₧	
9 December 2001	Rafael Moreno	€432,728.72	72.000.000 ₧	Biggest Spanish game show win at the time.
14 April 2003	Ernesto García	€555,000	92,344,230 ₧	
17 March 2004	Manuel Romero	€1,023,000	170,212,880 ₧	First win above €1,000,000.
8 May 2006	Eduardo Bonito	€2,190,000	364,385,340 ₧	
9 June 2006	Rubén García	€144,000	23,959,584 ₧	Final Antena 3 win until 2021.
6 August 2007	Marta Sierra	€96,000	15,973,056 ₧	First win of the Telecinco era.
18 September 2007	Daniel Cerrada	€186,000	30,947,796 ₧	First contestant to win El Rosco on their first show.
16 November 2007	Miguel Rodríguez	€240,000	39,932,640 ₧	
20 November 2007	Javier Pascual	€30,000	4,991,580 ₧	
11 December 2007	José Francisco Martín del Pozo	€66,000	10,981,476 ₧	
14 January 2008	Nuria Fernández	€24,000		
21 February 2008	Rafael Soriano	€228,000		
1 March 2008	Mariano Gazo	€54,000		
13 June 2008	María José Sánchez	€36,000		
10 January 2008	Francisco M. García	€90,000		
21 February 2008	Rafael Soriano	€228,000		
28 April 2008	Víctor Puig	€342,000		
6 June 2008	Pedro García	€234,000		
13 June 2008	Manoli Casas	€192,000		
3 September 2008	Pilar Aimeigeiras	€156,000		
October 2008	Emilio Maestro	€180,000		
25 November 2008	Javier Álvarez	€312,000		
7 December 2008	Beatriz Soria	€72,000		
30 December 2008	Álvaro Altarejos	€132,000		
23 January 2009	Pedro Hernández	€132,000		
19 April 2009	José Manuel Lúcia	€396,000		
16 June 2009	Jon Iñaki Aguado	€282,000		
9 July 2009	Javier Granda	€108,000		
24 September 2009	Antonio García	€450,000		
13 December 2009	Rubén García	€366,000		
22 December 2009	Sebastián Cárdenas	€42,000		
10 January 2010	Francisco Javier Ajo	€102,000		
12 March 2010	Laura Gonzalo	€282,000		
22 March 2010	Pilar Acedo	€36,000		
4 May 2010	Carlos Rodriguez Rincón	€186,000		
17 June 2010	María José Hernanz	€180,000		
1 September 2010	Rosi Díaz	€162,000		
23 February 2011	Carlos Villalba	€852,000		
24 February 2012	César Garrido	€1,524,000		
21 May 2012	Alberto Izquierdo	€374,000		
18 July 2013	Juan Pedro Gómez	€1,674,000		
27 May 2014	Paz Herrera	€1,310,000		
21 August 2014	Paco de Benito	€362,000		
21 November 2014	Lilit Manukyan	€318,000		First winner to not have Spanish as a native language.
19 February 2015	Luis Esteban	€354,000		
24 February 2015	Jon Otazua	€18,000		Smallest Pasapalabra win.
11 June 2015	Susana García	€450,000		
10 October 2016	David Leo García	€1,866,000		Largest win of the Telecinco era.
17 January 2017	Carlos Adán	€318,000		
14 March 2017	Julio Escartín	€318,000		
19 December 2017	Antonio Ruiz	€1,164,000		
4 June 2018	The Díaz Family	€198,000		Only family to win the jackpot in the spin-off Pasapalabra en familia.
22 January 2019	Francisco José González	€1,542,000		Final win of the Telecinco era.
1 July 2021	Pablo Díaz	€1,828,000		First win of the Antena 3 revival.
27 September 2021	Sofia Álvarez	€466,000		To date smallest win of the Antena 3 revival.
16 March 2023	Rafa Castaño	€2,272,000		First contestant to get all 25 words in a row correctly.
15 May 2024	Óscar Díaz	€1,816,000		
6 February 2026 (Note: Show started on 5 February 2026; win was granted at 0:09 (UTC+1), 6 February 2026.)	Rosa Rodríguez	€2,716,000		Largest Pasapalabra win; first win over €2.5 million, but the last ever "El Rosco" win on the show.
