= List of programs broadcast by Telecinco =

This is a list of programs currently, formerly, and soon to be broadcast on Telecinco, in Spain.

== Shows ==
Original title	Years	Genre	Contributors
100% únicos	2023-¿?	Talk Show	Guillermo Fesser
20tantos	2002–2003	Drama series	Sergio Mur
25 palabras	2022–2023	Game show	Christian Gálvez
7 Vidas	1999–2006	Sitcom	Amparo Baró, Javier Cámara, Toni Cantó, Carmen Machi, Anabel Alonso, Blanca Portillo, and Gonzalo de Castro
Los 80	2004	Drama series	José Coronado and Aitana Sánchez-Gijón
A corazón abierto	2003		Jordi González
A mediodía, alegría	1991–1993	Children	Leticia Sabater and Sofía Mazagatos
A tu bola	2023	Variety show	Lara Álvarez and Florentino Fernández
A tu lado	2002–2007	Variety	Emma García
¡A ver si llego!	2009	Sitcom	Miriam Díaz-Aroca
Abre los ojos... y mira	2013–2014	Talk show	Emma García
Abogados	2001	Drama series	Javier Albalá, Roberto Álvarez, and Cristina Brondo
El accidente	2017–2018	Drama Series	Inma Cuesta and Quim Gutiérrez
Acorralados	2011	Reality Show	Jorge Javier Vázquez and Raquel Sánchez Silva
Acusados	2009–2010	Drama series	Blanca Portillo and José Coronado
Agitación + IVA	2005–2006	Comedy	Alfonso Vallejo, César Camino, and Isabel Pintor
Aída	2005–2014	Sitcom	Carmen Machi and Paco León, con Carmen Machi and Paco León
Al otro lado	2013		Carmen Porter
Al salir de clase	1997–2002	Soap opera	Mariano Alameda and Carmen Morales
Al ataque chow	2010	Comedy	Paz Padilla
Alta tensión	2021	Quiz show	Christian Gálvez
All you need is love... o no	2017	Dating show	Risto Mejide
¡Allá tú!	2004–2008; 2023–	Quiz show	Jesús Vázquez
Amores que duelen	2014	Reality show	Roberto Arce
Ana	1996–1999	Talk show	Ana García Lozano
El Anfitrión	2000	Talk show	Boris Izaguirre
Ángel o demonio	2011	Drama series	Aura Garrido, Jaime Olías and Mar Saura
Animales nocturnos	2020	Late Night	Cristina Tárrega
Aquí hay tomate	2003–2008	Variety	Jorge Javier Vázquez and Carmen Alcayde
Aquí no hay quien duerma	1995–1996	Talk show	Pepe Carrol
Aquí Paz y después Gloria	2015	Sitcom	Antonio Resines
Art Attack	2001–2005	Children	Jordi Cruz
Asalto al furgón del dinero	2009	Game show	Quico Taronjí
Así es la vida	2023–2024	Variety show	Sandra Barneda
Las aventuras del capitán Alatriste	2015	Drama series	Aitor Luna
¡Ay, que calor!	1990–1991		Luis Cantero and Eva Pedraza
Babylon Shoe	2024	Comedy	Carlos Latre
Bailando con las estrellas	2024–	Talent show	Jesus Vázquez and Valeria Mazza
La batalla de las estrellas	1993–1994	Game show	Bertín Osborne and Arantxa del Sol
B&b, de boca en boca	2014–	Drama series	Belén Rueda
Bellezas al agua	1990–1993	Game show	Norma Duval, Andoni Ferreño and Agustín Bravo
Bellezas en la nieve	1992	Game show	Andoni Ferreño
Birlokus klub	2004–2007	Children	
Las bodas de Sálvame	2013	Variety	Kiko Hernández and Carmen Alcayde
Boing	2009–2010	Children	
Bosé	2023	Drama Series	Iván Sánchez
Bricomanía	1997–2010		Kristian Pielhoff
Brigada Costa del Sol	2019	Drama series	Hugo Silva
Buenas tardes	2000	Talk show	Nuria Roca
El Buscador de historias	2006–2009	News	Emilio Pineda, Alberto Herrera and Gema Balbás
Cabaret Olé	2012	Talent show	José Corbacho and Soraya Arnelas
Caiga Quien Caiga	1996–2002; 2005–2008	Comedy	El Gran Wyoming and Manel Fuentes
La Caja	2009	Reality show	
Cámbiame	2015–2018	Reality show	Marta Torné
Cámbiame Noche	2015	Reality show	Marta Torné
Camera Café	2005–2009	Sitcom	Arturo Valls
Campamento de Verano	2013	Reality show	Joaquín Prat and Sonia Ferrer
Campeones de la playa	1994	Children	Luis Alberto Sánchez, María Abradelo and Leticia Sabater
Las Campos	2016–2018	Reality	María Teresa Campos and Terelu Campos
Cántame una canción	2010	Talent show	Pilar Rubio
Caronte	2020	Drama Series	Roberto Álamo
La Casa de la guasa	1993	Children	Teresa Rabal
La casa de tu vida	2004–2007	Reality	Jordi González
La casa fuerte	2020	Reality	Jorge Javier Vázquez
Casa para dos	1995	Sitcom	Juanjo Menéndez and Esperanza Roy
Cazamariposas	2014–2020	Variety	Nuria Marín Font and María Patiño
Celebrity School	2024–	Comedy panel	Christian Gálvez
Cheers	2011	Sitcom	Alberto San Juan
Chiringuito de Pepe	2014–	Sitcom	Santi Millán
La Chistera	1993	Comedy	Eugenio
Cita con Apeles	1997	Talk show	Padre Apeles
¡Clever!	2007	Quiz show	Emma García and Mario Picazo
El Club de la Comedia	2000–2003	Comedy	Javier Veiga
Club Disney	1998–2000	Children	Jordi Cruz
Cocineros sin estrella	2012	Cooking	José Ribagorda
Comer es un placer	1994	Cooking	Alfredo Amestoy
El comisario	1999–2009	Drama series	Tito Valverde
El Concursazo	1997–1998	Game show	Bermúdez
Contacto con tacto	1992–1994	Dating show	Bertín Osborne
La Corriente alterna	2002	Comedy	Llum Barrera
Crónicas Marcianas	1997–2005	Chat show	Javier Sardà
Cruce de caminos	1998		María Teresa Campos
Cuentos chinos	2023	Talk Show	Jorge Javier Vázquez
La Dama velata	2015	Drama series	Miriam Leone
Date un respiro	1993		Laura Valenzuela, Carmen Sevilla and Agustín Bravo
De buena Ley	2009–2014	Court show	Sandra Barneda
De domingo a domingo	1997–1998		Belinda Washington
De repente, los Gómez	2009	Sitcom	Alicia Borrachero and Gustavo Salmerón
De tal Paco tal astilla	1997	Sitcom	Francisco Rabal
De viernes	2023-¿?	Talk Show	Santi Acosta and Beatriz Archidona
Decisión final	2002	Quiz Show	Luis Lorenzo
Decogarden	2004–2010		Yolanda Alzola
Dejadnos solos	2009		Paz Padilla
Déjate querer	2022-2023	Talk show	Toñi Moreno and Paz Padilla.
Demos. El gran sondeo	2024	Variety Show	Risto Mejide
El Desafío bajo cero	2006	Game Show	Manel Fuentes and José Luis Uribarri
Desayuna con alegría	1991–1994	Children	Leticia Sabater and Sofía Mazagatos
Desde Palma con amor	1991–1992		Norma Duval and Concha Velasco
Desnudos por la vida	2023	Reality Show	Jesús Vázquez
El Desván del trasgo	1997	Children	
Día a día	1996–2004	Variety Show	María Teresa Campos
Diario de...	2004–2011		Mercedes Milá
El Diario de Jorge	2024-	Talk Show	Jorge Javier Vázquez
Dinamita	2000–2004	Comedy	Tricicle
Dinastías	2024-	Variety Show	Joaquín Prat
Díselo a Jordi	2007	Talk show	Jordi González
Do, re, mi	1998		Paloma Marín
El don de Alba	2013	Drama series	Martiño Rivas and Patricia Montero
Dutifrí	2007–2008		Javier Sardà
Ella es tu padre	2017–2018	Sitcom	Carlos Santos
Ellas son así	1999	Sitcom	María Barranco, Maribel Verdú and Neus Asensi
Emisión imposible	2000	Comedy	Bermúdez
En casa con Raffaella	1995	Variety Show	Raffaella Carrà
En directo contigo	1995	Variety Show	Belén Rueda and Carmen Sevilla
En el nombre de Rocío	2022	Docureality	Rocío Carrasco.
En los límites de la realidad	1993		Andrés Aberasturi
Enemigos Íntimos	2010–2011	Gossip Show	Santi Acosta
Engaño	2006	Dating show	Jordi González
Entre hoy y mañana	1990–1993	News	Luis Mariñas, Julio Fernández
Entre platos anda el juego	1990–1993		Juanito Navarro, Simón Cabido and Rafaela Aparicio
Escándalo. Relato de una obsesión	2023	Drama Series	Alexandra Jiménez
Escenas de matrimonio	2007–2010	Sitcom	Marisa Porcel, Daniel Muriel and Pepe Ruiz
Esposados	2013	Sitcom	Anabel Alonso
Esencia de poder	2001	Soap	Arantxa del Sol
Esta cocina es un infierno	2006	Reality	Carolina Ferre
Esta noche cruzamos el Mississippi	1995–1997	Late Night	Pepe Navarro
Esta noche gano yo	2022	Game show	Christian Gálvez, Carolina Cerezuela.
Está pasando	2007–2009	News	Emilio Pineda, Lucía Riaño and Daniel Domenjó
Este país merece la pena	2014	Documentary	Miguel Ángel Revilla
Este país necesita un repaso	1993–1995	Comedy	José Luis Coll
Esto es increíble	2008		Carolina Cerezuela
Estrenos de cartelera	2002–2007	variety Show	Raquel Revuelta
EuroGames	2020	Game show	Lara Álvarez and Joaquín Prat
Ex, ¿qué harías por tus hijos?	2014	Reality show	Emma García
Factor ADN	2009		Lucía Riaño
Factor X	2018	Talent show	Jesús Vázquez
Familia	2013	Drama series	Santiago Ramos and Alexandra Jiménez
Fernández y familia	1998	Sitcom	José Luis Gil
Fibrilando	2009	Sitcom	Arturo Valls
Fiebre del domingo noche	1999		Carlos Tena and Carolina Ferre
Fiesta	2022–	Talk show	Emma García
Flash, el juego de las noticias	1999	Game show	Juan Manuel López Iturriaga
Fort Boyard	2001	Game show	Paula Vázquez and Félix Álvarez
Frágiles	2012–2013	Sitcom	Santi Millán and Norma Ruiz
Fresa Ácida	2010		Carmen Alcayde, Cinta Méndez and Adriana Abenia
La fuga	2012	Drama series	María Valverde and Aitor Luna
Futbolísimo	1991–1992		J.J. Santos and Andrés Aberasturi
G-20	2009		Risto Mejide
El Gallinero	1997		Tonino
Goles son amores	1992–1993		Manolo Escobar and Loreto Valverde
Un golpe de suerte	2009	Drama series	Carmen Morales
Got Talent España	2016–	Talent Show	Santi Millán
El gran debate	2012–2013	Talk show	Jordi González and Sandra Barneda
Gran Hermano	2000–	Reality	Mercedes Milá / Jorge Javier Vázquez
Gran Hermano VIP	2004–2005; 2015–	Reality	Jesús Vázquez
Gran Hermano Dúo	2019	Reality	Jorge Javier Vázquez
La Gran ilusión	1999–2002		Concha García Campoy
Grandiosas	2002		Belinda Washington, Rosa Villacastín and Lolita Flores
El grupo	2000	Drama series	Héctor Alterio
Guaypaut	2008–2009	Game show	Carmen Alcayde
Guerra de sesos	2009	Quiz show	Jesús Vázquez
La Guillotina	2010	Quiz show	Jesús Vázquez
Hablando se entiende la basca	1991–1993	Talk show	Jesús Vázquez
Hablando se entiende la gente	1990–1993	Talk show	José Luis Coll
Hable con ellas	2014–	Talk show	Sandra Barneda
Hay una cosa que te quiero decir	2012–2015		Jorge Javier Vázquez
Hechos reales	2018	Variety show	Jordi González
Hermanas	1998	Sitcom	Ángela Molina
Hermanos	2014	Drama	María Valverde
Hermanos y Detectives	2007–2009	Drama	Diego Martín
Historias de hoy	2000	News	Paloma Ferre
Historias de la puta mili	1994	Sitcom	Juan Diego
Hola, hola, hola	1997		Paz Padilla
Homicidios	2011	Drama series	Eduardo Noriega
La hora de los corazones solitarios	2005		Óscar Martínez
Hora límite	1995–1996		Luis Mariñas
Horizonte: Informe Covid	2020–2021	Science	Iker Jiménez
Hormigas blancas	2007–2011	Talk show	Jorge Javier Vázquez
Hospital Central	2000–2012	Drama series	Jordi Rebellón
Hotel Glam	2003		Jesús Vázquez
Hoy en casa	1998		Isabel Preysler
Humor Amarillo	1990	Comedy	
Humor cinco estrellas	1991–1993		Mary Carmen, Juanito Navarro and Quique Camoiras
Idol Kids	2020–	Talent show	Jesús Vázquez
El Informal	1999–2002		Javier Capitán and Florentino Fernández
I love Escassi	2010		Jesús Vázquez
I love TV	2009–2015	Zapping	
Infiltrados	2010	Documentary	Javier Sardà
Informativos Telecinco	1990–	News	Pedro Piqueras
Inocente, inocente	1997–1998	Comedy	Paula Vázquez
Investigación Xpress	2009–2010		
La isla de las tentaciones	2020–	Reality show	Mónica Naranjo
Javier ya no vive solo	2002–2003	Sitcom	Emilio Aragón
El juego del euromillón	1998–2001, 2009	Game show	Paula Vázquez and Eva González
Las joyas de la corona	2010		Jordi González and Carmen Lomana
El juego de tu vida	2008–2010	Game show	Emma García
Karaoke	1994–1996		Daniel de la Cámara
Karlos Arguiñano en tu cocina	2004–2010	Cookery	Karlos Arguiñano
Kombai & Co.	2004–2005	Children's	Carlos Castel
El Laberinto de la memoria	2007	Talk show	María Teresa Campos
La que se avecina	2007–	Sitcom	José Luis Gil, Cristina Castaño, Jordi Sánchez, Pablo Chiapella, Cristina Medina and Antonia San Juan
Latrelevisión	2004–2005		Carlos Latre
El legado	2002	Quiz show	Roberto Kamphoff
Levántate	2015–	Talent show	Jesús Vázquez
Lid	2001	Quiz show	Nuria Roca
Little Big Show	2017–2018	Talent show	Carlos Sobera
Lo que escondían sus ojos	2016	Drama series	Blanca Suárez and Rubén Cortada
Mad in Spain	2017	Chat show	Jordi González
Madres. Amor y vida	2020–2022	Drama series	Belén Rueda
Maneras de sobrevivir	2005	Sitcom	Cristina Brondo
Las Mañanas de Tele 5	1993–1994	News	Laura Valenzuela and José María Iñigo
La máquina de la verdad	1993–1994		Julián Lago
Maravillas 10 y pico	1996	Sitcom	Quique Camoiras
El Marqués	2024	Drama Series	Víctor Clavijo
Más allá de la vida	2010–2012		Jordi Gonzalez
Más que amigos	1997–1999	Sitcom	Alberto San Juan and Melani Olivares
¡Más Que Baile!	2010	Talent show	Pilar Rubio
Más que coches GT	2006–		Carolina Alcázar
Materia reservada	2012–2013	Talk show	Santi Acosta and Emma García
Max clan	2003	Children	Daniel Diges
Me gustas tú	2002		Teté Delgado
Me lo dices o me lo cuentas	2017	Talent show	Jesús Vázquez
Me lo dijo Pérez	1999	Comedy	José Corbacho
Me quedo contigo	2019	Dating show	Jesús Vázquez
Me resbala	2023- ¿?	Comedy	Lara Álvarez
Mediafest Night Fever	2022-2023	Talent show	Jorge Javier Vázquez and Adela González.
Médico de familia	1995–1999	Sitcom	Emilio Aragón and Lydia Bosch
Mediterráneo	1999–2000	Drama series	Josema Yuste and Ana Duato
La mejor generación	2024	Talent Show	Lara Álvarez
Mental Masters	2024	Game Show	Carlos Sobera
Mesa de redacción	1993–1994	News	Luis Mariñas and Fernando Jáuregui
Mi casa es la tuya	2016–2023	Chat show	Bertín Osborne
Mi familia contra todos	2009	Quiz show	Jesús Vázquez
Mi gemela es hija única	2008–2009	Drama series	Alejandra Lorente
Mi querida España	1994		Laura Valenzuela
Mía es la venganza	2023	Soap Opera	Lydia Bosch
Mientras duermes	2009–2010		
Un Millán de cosas	1998–1999	Sitcom	Millán Salcedo
MIR	2007–2008	Drama series	Amparo Larrañaga
¡Mira quién salta!	2013–2014	Talent show	Jesús Vazquez
La mirada crítica	1998–2009, 2023–	News	Vicente Vallés, Montserrat Domínguez, María Teresa Campos and Ana Terradillos
Mira quien Mira	2010		Tania Llasera
Misterios sin resolver	1993–1994		Alfredo Amestoy and Julián Lago
Moncloa ¿dígame?	2001	Sitcom	Javier Veiga
Montealto: Regreso a la casa	2022	Docureality	Rocío Carrasco, Jorge Javier Vázquez.
Morancos Channel nº 5	2006	Comedy	Los Morancos
Moros y cristianos	1997–2001	Chat show	Javier Sardà and Jordi González
Motivos personales	2005	Drama series	Lydia Bosch
Mujeres al poder	2019–2022	Talk show	Ana Rosa Quintana
Mujeres y hombres y viceversa	2008–2018	Dating show	Emma García
El musical de tu vida	2023	Music	Carlos Sobera
Nada es igual	2012		Emma García
Nada personal	2001		Nuria Roca, Maribel Casany and Llum Barrera
Nadie es perfecto	2007	Quiz show	Jesús Vázquez
No es lo mismo	2004		Olga Viza
La noche... con Fuentes y Cía	2001–2005		Manel Fuentes
La Noche de José Mota	2013	Comedy	José Mota
La Noche de los sueños	2010		Emma García
La Noche por delante	1998		Jordi González
Las noches de tal y tal	1991		Jesús Gil y Gil
La noria	2007–2012	Variety show	Jordi González, Gloria Serra and Sandra Barneda
Nosolomúsica	1999–2012		Kay Rush
Una nueva vida	2003	Drama series	Nieve de Medina
El nuevo juego de la oca	1998	Game show	Andrés Caparrós Jr. and Paloma Marín
Nunca es tarde	1995–1997	Reality show	Ana Rosa Quintana
Operación Tony Manero	2008	Talent show	Christian Gálvez
Operación Triunfo	2005–2011	Talent show	Jesús Vázquez and Pilar Rubio
El padre de Caín	2016	Drama series	Quim Gutiérrez
Palomitas	2011	Comedy	José Corbacho
Para toda la vida. The Bachelorette	2022–2023	Dating show	Jesús Vázquez
Una Pareja feliz	1994–1995	Game show	Anne Igartiburu and Antonio Hidalgo
Parejología 3x2	2011–2012	Sitcom	Juanjo Puigcorbé
El Pasado es mañana	2005	Soap	Arantxa del Sol
Pasapalabra	2007–2019	Game show	Christian Gálvez
Pasaporte a la isla	2015–	Reality show	Jordi González
Pecado original	2002–2005		Pablo Cassinello
La pecera de Eva	2010–2011	Sitcom	Alexandra Jiménez
Pequeños gigantes	2014–2015	Talent show	Jesús Vázquez
Perdona nuestros pecados	1998		Jordi Estadella
Perdóname, señor	2017	Drama series	Paz Vega
Periodistas	1998–2002	Drama series	José Coronado
Pesadilla en el paraíso	2022–2023	Reality show	Lara Álvarez, Nagore Robles
Petra Delicado	1999	Drama series	Ana Belén
Piratas	2011	Drama series	Pilar Rubio
Plan C	2005		Carolina Ferre
Popstars	2002	Talent show	Jesús Vázquez
Por hablar que no quede	1995		Julián Lago
El precio justo	2021	Game show	Carlos Sobera
Pressing Catch	1990–1994	Sport	
El Príncipe	2014–2016	Drama	Álex González
El Programa de Ana	1994–1996		Ana García Lozano
El programa de Ana Rosa / AR	2005–2023	Chat show	Ana Rosa Quintana
El programa del verano	2005–2023		Joaquín Prat and Máximo Huerta
El pueblo	2020–2023	Sitcom	Santi Millán and Ruth Díaz
El Puente	1997		Tinet Rubira
Puerta a la fama	1996–1997		Juanma López Iturriaga
Punta Escarlata	2011	Soap opera	Nadia de Santiago
Qué gente tan divertida	1991		Javier Basilio and Loreto Valverde
¡Qué me dices!	1995–1998		Belinda Washington and Antonio Botella, Chapis
Qué punto	1999		Ana García Lozano
Qué tiempo tan feliz	2010–		María Teresa Campos
Quédate conmigo	2000		Ely del Valle and Patxi Alonso
Querida Concha	1992–1993		Concha Velasco
Querido maestro	1997–1998	Sitcom	Imanol Arias
Queridos padres	1992	Quiz show	Concha Velasco
¿Quién es mi padre?	2022	Chat show	Carlota Corredera.
¿Quiere ser millonario?	1999–2001	Quiz show	Carlos Sobera
Quiero ser	2016–2017	Talent show	Sara Carbonero
La quinta esfera	2003	Quiz show	Jorge Fernández
La quinta marcha	1990–1992		Jesús Vázquez and Penélope Cruz
Quítate tú pa' ponerme yo	1998	Drama series	Carlos Sobera
Reacción en cadena	2022–	Game show	Ion Aramendi
Rec	2003		Jordi González
El Reencuentro	2010–2011		Mercedes Milá and Jordi González
Resistiré, ¿vale?	2010–2011		Tania Llasera
Réplica	2008	Comedy	Carlos Latre
RIS Científica	2007	Drama series	José Coronado
Robin Food: Atracón a mano armada	2014–2015	Cooking	Martín Berasategui
Rocío, contar la verdad para seguir viva	2021	Docudrama	Rocío Carrasco
Rojo y negro	2008–2009		Nacho Abad
La Ruleta de la fortuna	1993–1997	Quiz show	Andoni Ferreño, Goyo González and Carlos Lozano
Sábado dolce vita	2005–2007		Santiago Acosta
Salsa rosa	2001–2005		Santiago Acosta
Sálvame	2009–2023	Chat show	Jorge Javier Vázquez, Paz Padilla and Carlota Corrdera
Sálvame Deluxe	2009–2023	Chat show	Jorge Javier Vázquez, Terelu Campos and María Patiño.
Se acabó la siesta	1992		Laura Valenzuela and Carmen Sevilla
Se enciende la noche	2013–2014	Late night chat show	Jordi González
¿Se puede?	1993–1994		Carmen Sevilla and Agustín Bravo
Sé quién eres	2017	Drama series	Blanca Portillo
Secretos de Estado	2019	Drama series	Miryam Gallego
La Semana que viene	1998		Julia Otero
Sentido común	2017	Comedy	
Señoras del (h)AMPA	2019	Drama series	Toni Acosta and Malena Alterio
Señor Alcalde	1998	Sitcom	Carlos Larrañaga
La séptima silla	2009		Sandra Barneda
Los Serrano	2003–2008	Sitcom	Antonio Resines and Belén Rueda
Sí o no	1994	Quiz show	Ángel Garó
Sin ir más lejos	1995		Belén Rueda
Sin tetas no hay paraíso	2008–2009	Drama series	Miguel Ángel Silvestre, Amaia Salamanca and María Castro
Sinceramente tuyo	1994		Jesús Puente
Socialité	2017–	News	María Patiño
Sonría, por favor	1996	Quiz show	Elsa Anka
Su media naranja	1990–1996	Game show	Jesús Puente and Tate Montoya
El Súper	1996–1999	Soap opera	Natalia Millán
Supercharly	2010	Sitcom	Malena Alterio
Superguay	1991–1993		Miliki and Rita Irasema
Supervivientes: Expedición Robinson/La Gran Aventura	2000–2001		Juanma López Iturriaga and Paco Lobatón
Supervivientes: Perdidos en el Caribe/Honduras/Nicaragua	2006–2011, 2014–		Jesús Vázquez, Christian Gálvez and Jorge Javier Vázquez
Tapas y barras	2014	Cooking	Mario Sandoval
Las Tardes de Alicia	1998–1999	Chat show	Alicia Senovilla
TardeAr	2023-		Ana Rosa Quintana
Tele 5 ¿dígame?	1990–1992		Laura Valenzuela, Javier Basilio and Andrés Aberasturi
La Tele es tuya, colega	1994		Inma Brunton and Luis Alberto Sánchez
Telebuten	1994		Beatriz Rico
Telecupón	1990–1998	Game show	Carmen Sevilla and Agustín Bravo
Teletipos	2006	Comedy	Tricicle
El tiempo del Descuento	2020	Reality	Jorge Javier Vázquez
Un Tiempo nuevo	2014–2015	Talk show	Sandra Barneda
Tierra de lobos	2010–2014	Drama series	Álex García Fernández and María Castro
Tirando a dar	2006	Sitcom	Fernando Guillén Cuervo
TNT	2004–2007		Jordi González and Yolanda Flores
Todo el mundo es bueno	2012	Talent show	Pilar Rubio and José Corbacho
Todos los hombres sois iguales	1996–1998	Sitcom	Josema Yuste, Fernando Valverde and Luis Fernando Alvés
Toma cero y a jugar	2009–2010	Game show	Daniel Domenjó and David Venancio Muro
Toma nota	1998	Game show	Paloma Marín
¡Toma salami!	1998	Comedy	Javier Capitán
Top Star. ¿Cuánto vale tu voz?	2021	Talent show	Jesús Vázquez
El topo	2009		Emilio Pineda and Daniel Domenjó
El Trampolín	1994–1995		Pedro Rollán
Tres son multitud	2003	Sitcom	Jaime Blanch
La Tribu	2009		Javier Sardà
Truhanes	1993–1994	Drama series	Paco Rabal and Arturo Fernández
Tú sí que vales	2008–2013	Talent show	Christian Gálvez
Tutti frutti	1990–1992	Comedy	Cruz y Raya and Raúl Sénder
La última cena	2020	Cooking show	Jorge Javier Vázquez
La última noche	2023	Talk Show	Sandra Barneda
El Último verano	1999	Sitcom	
Universo Lomana	2010		Carmen Lomana
Uno para todas	1995–1996	Game show	Goyo González
El ventilador	2007–2008	Variety show	Yolanda Flores
Valanota	2008	Game show	Óscar Martínez
Vamos a ver	2023-		Joaquín Prat and Patricia Pardo
¡Vaya fauna!	2015	Talent show	Christian Gálvez
Vaya nochecita	1995	Game show	Pepe Carroll and Eva Pedraza
¡Vaya vacaciones!	2023	Reality show	Luján Argüelles
Veraneando	1993		Bertín Osborne and Remedios Cervantes
Verano a Tope	2010		
La verdad	2018	Drama Series	Lydia Bosch and Jon Kortajarena
Veredicto	1994–1995	Court show	Ana Rosa Quintana
Vida loca	2011	Sitcom	Toni Cantó and Esther Arroyo
La vida sin filtros	2023	Talk Show	Cristina Tárrega
Vientos de agua	2005	Drama series	Ernesto Alterio
VIP	1990	Game show	Emilio Aragón and José Luis Moreno
Vip Guay	1990–1992	Game show	Emilio Aragón
VIP noche	1990–1992	Game show	Emilio Aragón and Belén Rueda
Viva la vida	2017–2022	Talk show	Toñi Moreno
Vivan los compis	1992	Children	Leticia Sabater
Vivan los novios	1991–1993	Dating show	Andoni Ferreño, Arantxa del Sol and Natalia Estrada
Vivir sin permiso	2018–2020	Drama series	José Coronado and Álex González
Vivo cantando	2003	Talent show	Jesús Vázquez and José María Iñigo
Volverte a ver	2018–2021	Talk show	Carlos Sobera
La Voz	2012–2017	Talent show	Jesús Vazquez and Tania Llasera
La Voz Kids	2014–2017	Talent show	Jesús Vazquez
Vuélveme loca	2009–2012	Variety	Celia Montalbán and Patricia Pérez
The Wall	2017	Game show	Carlos Sobera
Wrong Side of the Tracks	2022-2024	Drama series	José Coronado.
Xq no te callas	2008		Carolina Cerezuela and Eugeni Alemany
Xuxa Park	1992	Children's	Xuxa
¿Y tú bailas?	1998		Àngels Gonyalons
Ya empezamos	1997	Talk show	Alicia Senovilla
Ya es mediodía	2018–2023	News	Sonsoles Ónega
Ya es verano	2022	Variety show	Frank Blanco
Ya son las ocho	2021–2022	Talk show	Sonsoles Ónega
Yo soy Bea	2006–2009	Soap	Ruth Nuñez, Alejandro Tous, Norma Ruiz and Mónica Estarreado

== Sport rights ==
=== Spain ===
Competition/Tournament/Event	Years	Genre
Copa del Rey	2015–2017	Association football
Supercopa de España	2015–2017	Association football

=== International ===
Region	Competition/Tournament/Event	Years	Genre
Worldwide	FIFA World Cup	2010–2018	Association football
Europe	UEFA European Championship	2012–present	Association football
Europe	UEFA European Qualifiers	2019–present	Association football
Europe	UEFA Nations League	2018–present	Association football
Europe	UEFA Team Friendly Matches	2018–present	Association football
Worldwide	FIBA Basketball World Cup	2014–present	Basketball
Europe	EuroBasket	2013–present	Basketball
Worldwide	Formula One	2004–2008	Motorsport

== Bibliography ==
- España, Ramón de. La caja de las sorpresas. 2001. Editorial Planeta. ISBN 84-08-04066-9
- Sempere Bernal, Antonio. Locos por la tele 2005. ISBN 84-8454-460-5
- Valezuela, Javier. Usted puede ser tertuliano 2011. Ediciones Península. ISBN 978-84-9942-102-5
