= Vicente Vallés =

Television news presenter in Spain

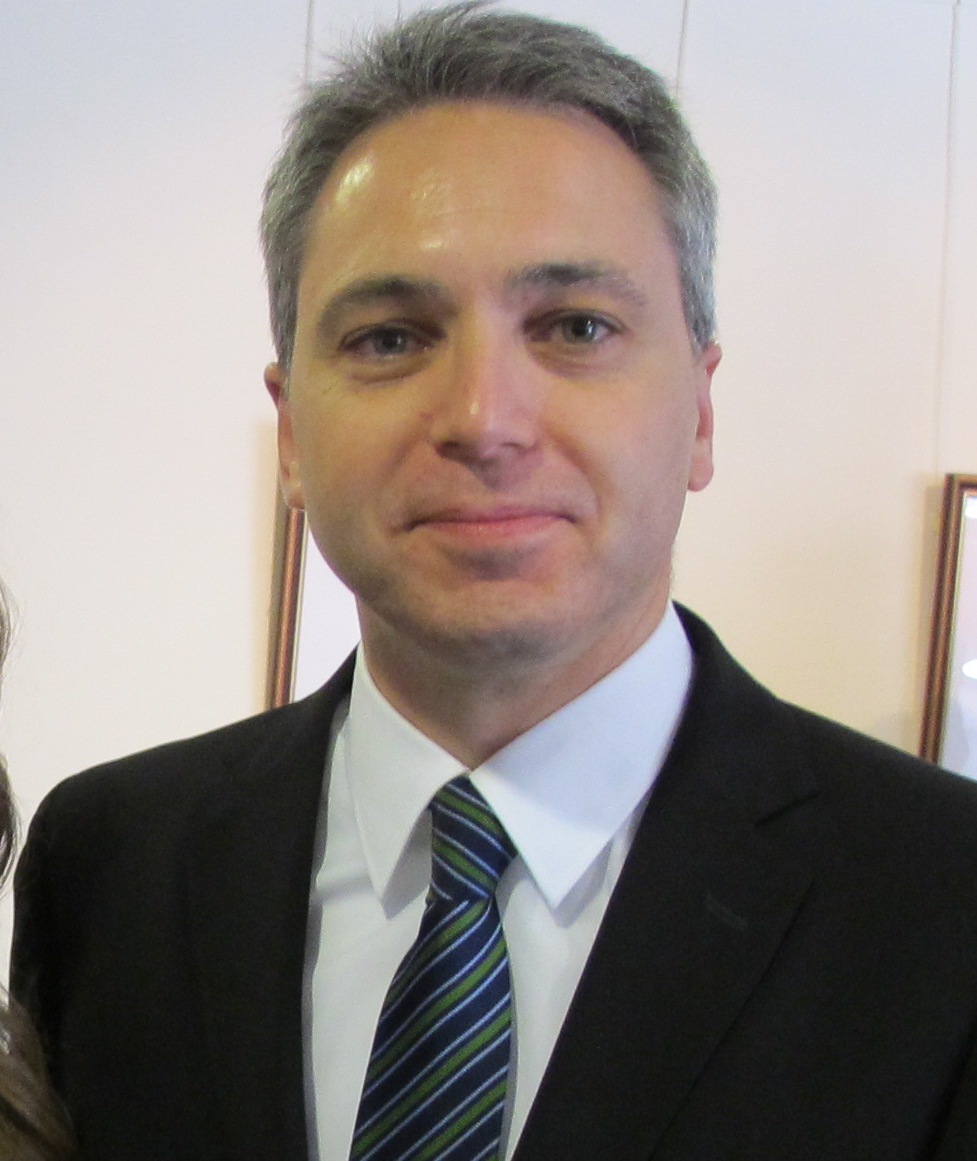
- Vallés in 2011
- Born: Vicente Vallés Choclán; 18 July 1963 (age 63); Madrid, Spain
- Education: Universidad Complutense de Madrid
- Years active: 1985–present
- Known for: Journalist, news anchor and writer
- Television: Antena 3 Noticias (2011–present); Informativos Telecinco (1994–2008); La mirada crítica (1998–2000, 2004–08); La noche en 24 horas (2008–11)
- Spouses: Lucía Méndez (divorced); Ángeles Blanco (married 2013–present)
- Children: 3

Vicente Vallés Choclán (born 18 July 1963) is a Spanish journalist and television presenter who anchors Antena 3 Noticias.

== Early life and education ==
After studying his secondary and Spanish Baccalaureate education in Alcorcón, he graduated in information science from the journalism branch of the Complutense University of Madrid. Vallés has said that, despite not coming from a family of journalists - as is often common in Spain - his household never missed the daily newspaper, saying that many afternoons he would sit with his father in the living room, passing the time with the newspaper.

== Career ==
He started in broadcasting at the radio network Cadena SER, working on the programmes Hora 25 de los Negocios and Hoy por hoy. In 1987, he joined the sports broadcasting unit at TVE, where he remained until he moved to Telemadrid in 1989, where he formed part of the news team, as the main leader of the 8.30pm news with Hilario Pino.

In 1994, he joined Telecinco as the political editor of Informativos Telecinco, then referred to as Las noticias. In 1997, he was named deputy editor of Informativos Telecinco, a position he held for eleven years, where he was responsible for the process of digitalising newsgathering, the first time this was used in Spain.

In January 1998 the channel gave him the presenting role on La mirada crítica, the daily daytime current affairs discussion show, every Friday. In 1999 he started to present the weekend news bulletins. In 2001, he was in New York when the September 11 attacks occurred, reporting over the phone to the Telecinco news studio in Madrid. In 2004, he reported from the scene of the 11-M bombings in the capital.

In 2004 he returned to La mirada crítica after Montserrat Domínguez jumped ship to Antena 3. He stayed with the show and with Informativos Telecinco until 2008, when he left in protest at Telecinco wanting to focus the show on entertainment gossip. In September 2008, he became the subleader of TVE's Canal 24 Horas, where he presented the interviews and current affairs programme La noche en 24 horas.

Between 5 September 2011 and 25 June 2016 he directed and presented Antena 3 Noticias 1, the 3pm newscast, replacing Roberto Arce after his move to Cuatro. During his first series on Antena 3, he presented with Mónica Carrillo, and after 2012 with Lourdes Maldonado.

He has been the moderator of four election debates in 2015, 2016 and twice in 2019 - one in April and one in November. On 7 December 2015 he moderated the 7D: El debate decisivo four-way debate with Ana Pastor, which gained 9.2 million viewers and a 48.2% share when broadcast on all of the Atresmedia channels, becoming the most-watched broadcast of the year. He moderated the debate on 13 June 2016, simulcast across seventeen channels with both Ms. Pastor and Pedro Piqueras, who took his job at Informativos Telecinco eight years prior. It attracted almost 10.5 million viewers.

After five years at A3 Noticias 1, Vallés presented the flagship Antena 3 Noticias 2 at 9pm on weeknights with Esther Vaquero. In 2023, he reunited with Ana Pastor to present that year's head-to-head election debate between Pedro Sánchez and Alberto Núñez Feijóo, however both were criticised for not intervening more in a heated debate. Vallés defended his performance, saying that by leaving the pair to discuss between each other, audiences got to know more about their personalities.

Vallés presented the results of the 2023 local elections and snap general election on Antena 3, and reprised his role for the Catalan and European elections the following year. Vallés occasionally writes for newspapers 20 minutos, La Razón and El Confidencial.

In June 2023, it was reported that Mediaset España had offered him a contract worth over €1 million to jump ship back to their network, but he had rejected it, saying that Telecinco had neglected its news broadcasts, and he would have to start over to resuscitate their coverage. In April 2024, he was awarded an honorary doctorate by the Valencian International University, and later appeared on Antena 3 chat show El Hormiguero.

=== Writing ===
Vallés has written two books on politics and foreign affairs: Trump y la caída del imperio Clinton ("Trump and the fall of the Clinton empire") was released in 2017, analysing the key reasons for Donald Trump's victory in the 2016 presidential election, and El rastro de los rusos muertos ("Tracing the dead Russians") was released in 2019, analysing Vladimir Putin's foreign policy, and the unexplained deaths of Russian spies and diplomats. In 2022, he published the political thriller Operación Kazan, a novel about a complex spy plot in which the KGB, CIA and National Intelligence Centre are all involved.

== Private life ==
Vallés was originally married to fellow journalist Lucía Méndez, with whom he had two children. He then married Ángeles Blanco, whom he met when working at Informativos Telecinco, and they have one son.

His brother José Antonio Vallés Choclán is also the National Politics and Defence Correspondent at Informativos Telecinco. They are both supporters of Atlético Madrid, with Vallés quipping in 2023 that he was "more worried about whether Atleti would sign a striker than the formation of the government", after the protracted negotiations to agree a ruling coalition after that year's general election.
