= Ana García Lozano =

Spanish journalist (born 1963)

- Born: 23 September 1963 (age 62); Valencia, Spain
- Education: Complutense University of Madrid
- Occupations: Journalist; presenter
- Spouse: Víctor García (m. 1995)
- Mother: Maruja Lozano
- Relatives: Manolo Escobar (uncle)
- Awards: Antena de Oro (2006)

Ana García Lozano (born 23 September 1963) is a Spanish journalist and presenter.

== Biography ==
Ana García Lozano is the niece of singer Manolo Escobar. Her father, Baldomero García Escobar (died 29 December 1999), was one of three brothers who accompanied the famous artist on guitar. Her mother is retired Valencian copla singer María Lozano Soto, known professionally as Maruja Lozano, who resides in Torremolinos. Ana has a brother, Javier.

She earned a licentiate in Journalism from the Complutense University of Madrid and began her career in the world of radio. Her first job was at Radio España, where she began working as a program producer in 1982. After obtaining her degree, she joined Cadena COPE in 1986, working both on the air on musical programs and in production.

With the arrival of private television, she switched media, and in 1990 she was hired by Telecinco to perform coordination tasks for the programs VIP Noche and VIP Guay, presented by Emilio Aragón. Good professional relations with Aragón led her to be hired by his production company, Globomedia, and continue working on the coordination of the programs that he hosted on Antena 3 from 1992 to 1994: Noche, noche and El gran juego de la oca.

In 1994, she was put in front of the camera for the first time to host the Telemadrid show El programa de Ana. It was a novel format in Spain, although it is well known elsewhere, especially in English-speaking countries: the talk show or testimonial program, in which members of the public relate their life experiences. The program was a great ratings success and it was broadcast for two seasons, opening the way for many similar programs on other networks. Soon afterward, Telemadrid hired Gemma Nierga to present an almost identical program.

On 16 July 1995, Lozano married the producer Víctor García García. They have two children together, Pablo and Natalia.

Such was the success of her first talk show that the journalist was hired by a national network, Telecinco, to repeat the format with a program simply titled Ana. It ran for three seasons, until 1999. The summer of that year she also presented the magazine ¡Qué punto! on Telecinco.

In 2001 she was hired by Televisión Española (TVE) to host the debate program Ésta es mi historia, which was broadcast until 2004. A year later, also on TVE, she led the identity-swapping reality show Préstame tu vida.

Her next project on television was for Cuatro: another reality show entitled La casa de cristal (2006), and she contributed to the magazine Channel nº4 from 2006 to 2008.

In November 2004 she was hired by Punto Radio to take charge of its Sunday night program, and in 2006 she hosted the morning show Ana en Punto Radio.

On 1 September 2008 she began hosting Queremos hablar on weekday afternoons, leaving the station in July 2010 after differences with the programming director, and once her contract ended.

Beginning in September 2012, she contributed to the Radio Nacional de España (RNE) program No es un día cualquiera, presented by Pepa Fernández. From 4 March to 14 June 2013, Lozano presented the talk show Tenemos que hablar on the TVE channel La 1. The cancellation of this program after only 3 months on the air was announced by the head of RTVE, Leopoldo González Echenique, in his appearance before the Congress of Deputies, saying "it is not giving the results we expected."

In September 2013, she announced her signing to the Telecinco short-show De buena ley.

== Career ==
- Producer and news editor on Radio España, 1982–1986
- Producer and announcer of musical programs on Cadena COPE, 1986–1990
- Coordinator and producer of VIP Noche and VIP Guay on Telecinco, 1990–1992
- Coordinator and producer of Noche, noche and El gran juego de la oca on Antena 3, 1992–1994
- Presenter and director of El programa de Ana on Telemadrid, 1994–1996
- Presenter and coordinator of Ana on Telecinco, 1996–1999
- Presenter and producer of various specials on Telecinco, 1999–2000
- Presenter, producer, coordinator, and special guest of various programs on TVE, 2000–2001
- Presenter and director of Ésta es mi historia on TVE, 2001–2004
- Presenter and director of Préstame tu vida on TVE, 2005
- Presenter and director of La casa de cristal on Cuatro, 2006
- Announcer and director of Ana en Punto Radio, 2006–2008
- Contributor to Channel nº4 on Cuatro, 2006–2008
- Announcer and producer of Queremos Hablar on Punto Radio, 2008–2010
- Contributor to No es un día cualquiera on RNE, 2012
- Presenter of Tenemos que hablar on TVE, 2013
- Contributor to De buena ley on Telecinco, 2013–2014

== Awards ==
Ana García Lozano was awarded the 2006 Antena de Oro for Radio, and was nominated for the TP de Oro as Best Host for Ana in 1996, 1997, and 1998.
