= Patricia Pérez =

Patricia Pérez may refer to:

- Patricia Pérez (footballer) (born 1979), Mexican footballer
- Patricia Pérez (gymnast) (born 2004), Spanish gymnast
- Patricia Pérez (television presenter) (born 1973), Spanish actress, presenter and writer
- Patricia Pérez (athlete), Chilean sprinter
- Patricia Pérez Goldberg (born 1974), Chilean lawyer and politician
