= Ana Terradillos =

Spanish journalist and TV host

- Born: Ana Terradillos Azpiroz; 1 October 1973 (age 51); San Sebastián, Basque Country, Spain
- Education: University of Navarre (Journalism, 1991–1996); UNED (Political science, 1997–2002)
- Occupation(s): Journalist; Television presenter
- Employer: Mediaset España
- Television: El programa del verano (2016–2022); Cuatro al día (2020–2022); La mirada crítica (2023–present)

Ana Terradillos Azpiroz (born 1 October 1973) is a Spanish journalist and TV presenter. A frequent collaborator on Telecinco and Cuatro programmes, she has been the host of Telecinco's breakfast show La mirada crítica since 2023.

== Biography ==
Terradillos graduated in journalism at the University of Navarra in 1996 and in Political Science at UNED in 2002. She started working in the media in 1998: she started at Cadena COPE in her native San Sebastián, yet soon moved to Cadena SER.

In 2003 she started to cover the Iraq War, from which she eventually branched out into specialising in covering terrorist groups more generally, such as ETA and Al-Qaeda.

During 2005 she travelled to the Middle East on various occasions, to cover various conflicts in areas including Gaza, as well as reporting on terrorist groups including Hamas and Hezbollah in Lebanon and Syria, as well as Salafi groups linked to Al-Qaeda in the south of Lebanon.

In 2011 Terradillos moved to Mediaset to appear infrequently on its political discussion shows including Las mañanas de Cuatro and El programa de Ana Rosa. On the latter she would often substitute for Joaquín Prat hosting current affairs discussions. From 2014 to 2015 she was a regular collaborator on Un Tiempo Nuevo, presented on Cuatro by Sandra Barneda and Javier Ruiz Pérez.

In 2016, when working for Cadena SER, Terradillos published the so-called PISA report, a false document that wrongly accused Podemos of illegal financing. It was later revealed that Terradillos believed that the document was flawed when the story first appeared, yet was told to publish it anyway.

She published her first book in 2016, Vivir después de matar, in which she detailed testimonials from ex-ETA members asking for forgiveness after the group agreed to give up its arms in 2011. In 2018, she hosted España mira a la Meca, her own solo programme delving into Spain's Muslim community. She also became part of the team on Telecinco's daytime chat show Ya es mediodía with Sonsoles Ónega.

In 2019, Terradillos won an award from the Guardía Civil for her work covering their fight against immigration in Mauritania.

In 2021, notes were released showing that Terradillos had asked corrupt policeman José Manuel Villarejo for information in 2016. The notes also showed that Terradillos had been in contact with PP spin doctor Francisco Martínez, who had originally directed Terradillos to publish the PISA report in 2016 despite her own correct suspicions about the document.

In 2022, after Ónega left Mediaset a station shakeup saw Terradillos move to present Cuatro al día. The next year she left to become the host of the reboot of Telecinco's breakfast programme La mirada crítica, which covered much of the morning slot when Ana Rosa Quintana moved to the afternoons. After Quintana's show flopped and she returned to her former slot in the mornings, La mirada crítica was cut to last just one hour and moved slightly earlier in the morning.

== TV and radio career ==
=== Radio ===
Year	Network
1998–1999	Cadena COPE
1999–2022	Cadena SER

=== Television ===
Year	Programme	Channel	Role
2011–2022	El programa de Ana Rosa	Telecinco	Collaborator, stand-in presenter
2011–2018	Las mañanas de Cuatro	Cuatro	Collaborator
2014–2015	Un tiempo nuevo	Telecinco/Cuatro	Collaborator
2018–2021	Ya es mediodía	Telecinco	Collaborator
2018–2021	180 minutos	Telemadrid	Collaborator
2018	España mira a La Meca	Telecinco	Presenter
2020–2023	Cuatro al día	Cuatro	Collaborator; presenter (2022–2023)
2021–2022	En el punto de mira	Cuatro	Reporter and presenter
2022	Ucrania: esto no se podrá olvidar	Telecinco	Presenter
2023–present	La mirada crítica	Telecinco	Presenter
