= Dani La Chepi =

Argentine television presenter

- Born: Daniela Josefina Viaggiamari; 7 October 1979 (age 47); Boulogne, Buenos Aires, Argentina
- Occupations: Television presenter; actress; comedian; social media influencer; singer
- Years active: from 1997
- Awards: Martín Fierro Digital Award for the best instagramer

Daniela Viaggiamari, known professionally by her stage name Dani La Chepi (born 7 October 1979) is an Argentine television presenter, actress, singer, comedian and social media influencer.

== Career ==
Dani La Chepi is of Italian descent. She began her career when she was sixteen years old. During her studies, she had the opportunity to act in a scene of the program, Feliz Domingo. She worked in television between 1997 and 1998 after joining the cast of the youth program, Los Más Más. She later participated in several soap operas, such as EnAmorArte, Floricienta, Rincón de luz, My love, Married with children, Almost Angels, Pirate Soul and I Will Survive. She also worked on radio, participating in El Mundo, Pop and Los 40 Principales, where she worked with Iván de Pineda. She appeared on Radio Belgrano, Pop Radio and Radio El Mundo, and was a contestant on the second season of MasterChef Celebrity Argentina.

In cinema, she has worked in supporting roles in the films La Boleta (2013), directed by Andrés Paternostro, starring Damián de Santo, Marcelo Mazzarello, Claudio Rissi and Roly Serrano and in Ten Less (2018), directed by Roberto Salomone, together with Diego Pérez and Daniel Alvaredo.

She sang alongside Cacho Castaña at the Café, La Humedad. In 2020, she released a song What are you going to do in collaboration with Evelyn Botto. She also worked on the video Loca de mi corazón, by Manuel Wirzt.

In theatre, she performed in Dani, La Chepi de noche directed by Noralih Gago, Final battle of comedians and Ella, along with Ariel Tarico. She also hosts business and social events and runs her own tango show featuring melodic themes, appearing in places like San Clemente, Villa Gesell, San Bernardo, Miramar, and Mar del Plata.

She is author of a book titled, The important thing is to be happy (Planeta, 2018).

She is an instagrammer with more than three million subscribers and posts humorous videos and scenes with celebrities, such as Pablo Granados, "El Tucu" López, Rodrigo Guirao Díaz and Mariano Martínez. She was the winner of a Martín Fierro Digital Award for the best instagrammer.

== Private life ==
From 2020 until 2022, she was in a relationship with Javier Cordone, a trucker and ex-soccer player whom she met while making one of her videos with her daughter during the quarantine.

In July 2022, Dani La Chepi revealed she is pansexual and is open to being in a relationship with a woman.

== Cinema ==
Year	Title	Role	Direction	Grades
2013	The ticket	Norm	Andres Paternostro	Cast
2017	Hypersomnia	Daniel	Gabriel Grieco	Participation
2018	Ten less	Sandra	Roberto Solomon	Cast
2018	The footprints of my lost daughter	Nora	Agustina Macri	Short film
2019	Death does not exist and neither does love	Sophia	Fernando Salem	Cast

== Television ==
Fictions
Year	Title	Role	Channel	Grades
1999	Chiquititas	Marine	Telefe	Special Participation
1999	Wild	Valeria	Azul TV	Special Participation
2002	InLoveArt	Agnes "Gilda"	Telefe	Recurring
2003	Light Corner	Roberta	America TV	Special participation
2003	I will survive	Valeria	Telefe	Special participation
2005	Floricienta	Catherine	eltrece	Special participation
2005	My love	Dani	Telefe	Special participation
2006	Pirate Soul	Ana Caride	Telefe	Recurring
2006	Married, with children	Yolanda	Telefe	Episode: "Hard Goal Cafe"
2007	Almost angels	Mary	Telefe	Special participation
2007	B&B	Monteri Blue	Telefe	Special participation
TBA	The one in charge	TBA	Star+	

Programs
Year	Title	Role	Channel	Grades
1997–1998	The Most Most	Cheerleader	Channel 9	Staff member
1999–2000	Saturday bus	Dancer staff	Telefe	Dance member
2021	MasterChef Celebrity Argentina 2	Participant	Telefe	12th eliminated
2021	After Hour: The other competition	Participant	Digital platform	Winner
2021	Bake Off Argentina	Digital host	Telefe	_{Season 3}
2022	100 Argentines say	Replacement host	eltrece	
2022	100 Argentinians say: Celebrities	Replacement host	eltrece	
2022	The Great Game of the Goose	Host	eltrece	

== Theater ==
- 2018/2019: Dani, La Chepi at night
- 2019: OOPS! Vol 10
- 2019: Final battle of comedians
- 2019/2020: She

== Prizes ==
- 2021: Martín Fierro Digital Award for Best Humorous Work, and Martín Fierro Digital Gold Award.
- 2017: Martín Fierro Digital Award for the best instagramer.

== See also ==
- eltrece
- El gran juego de la oca
