= Bake Off Argentina, El Gran Pastelero =

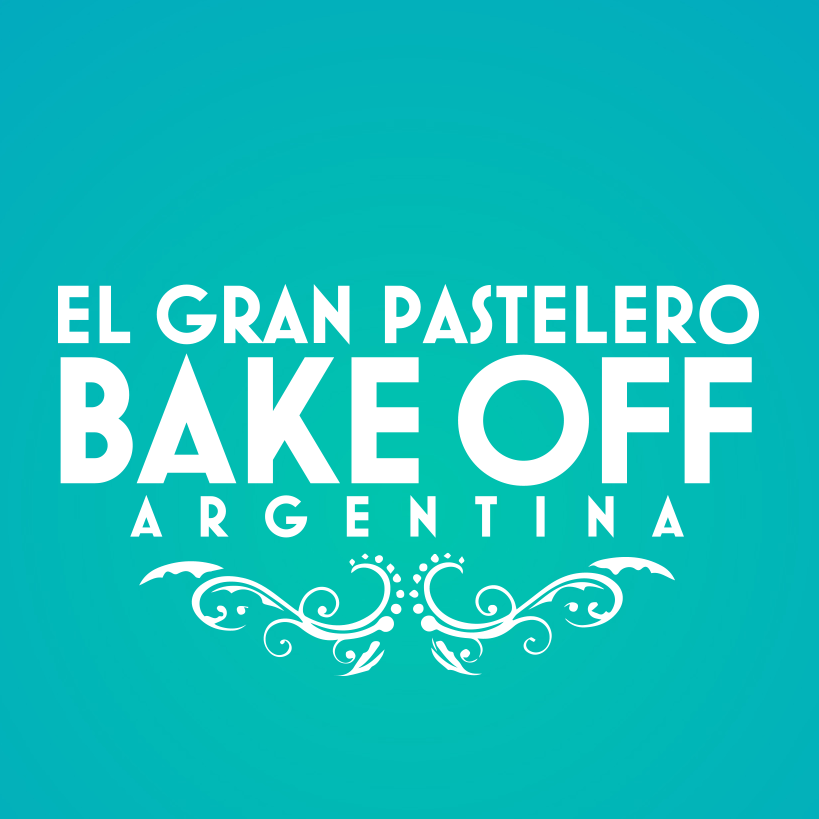
- Genre: Baking, cooking
- Presented by: Paula Chaves
- Judges: Pamela Villar (2018-2021); Damián Betular (2018-2021); Christophe Krywonis (2018-2020); Doli Irigoyen (2021)
- Country of origin: Argentina
- Original language: Spanish
- No. of seasons: 3

Production
- Production location: Buenos Aires
- Running time: 90 minutes
- Production company: Turner International Argentina

Original release
- Network: Telefe
- Release: 8 April 2018 – 5 July 2020

Bake Off Argentina: El Gran Pastelero is an Argentine reality television broadcast by Telefe and produced by Turner International Argentina based on the British television baking competition The Great British Bake Off. In this Argentine version, 14 amateur bakers compete against each other in a series of rounds, attempting to impress a group of judges with their baking skills to be named the best amateur baker in Argentina. Every week the amateur bakers face two challenges with a thematic.

It premiered on April 8, 2018, and it is hosted by Paula Chaves with judges Christophe Krywonis, Damián Betular and Pamella Villar. To date, the reality competition has three seasons (2018, 2020 & 2021).

== Seasons summary ==
Season	Release	Winner	Runner-up	Third place	Rating average
1	8 April – 24 June 2018	Gastón Salas	Hernán Lambertucci	Elsa Cáceres	13.8
2	1 March – 5 July 2020	~~Samantha Casais~~; Damián Pier Basile	~~Damián Pier Basile~~	Agustina Guz	10.7
3	13 September – 8 November 2021	Carlos Martinic	Facundo Tarditti		
Famosos	2024	TBA			

== Host and judges ==
Host/Judges	Season			
Host/Judges	1	2	3	F
Paula Chaves	Host			
Christophe Krywonis	Judge			Judge
Damián Betular	Judge			
Pamela Villar	Judge			
Lizardo Ponce		Digital		
Dolli Irigoyen			Judge	
Dani La Chepi			Digital	
Wanda Nara				Host
Maru Botana				Judge

== 1st season (2018) ==
The first season was premiered on April 8 and last aired on June 24, 2018. The filming took place in Benavidez, Buenos Aires.

=== Contestants ===
Contestants	Age	Occupation	Hometown	Status
Juan Cruz Raia	26	Employee	Ramos Mejia	Eliminated 1st
Lorena González	35	Military	Córdoba	Eliminated 2nd
Candela Dalle Palle	41	Administrative employee	Caballito	Eliminated 3rd
Marcela Piazzese	52	Teacher	Villa Crespo	Eliminated 4th
Fabián Fusca	44	Priest	San Justo	Eliminated 5th
Gabriel Rojas	26	Factory worker	Lomas de Zamora	Eliminated 6th
Agostina Chinelli	23	Actress and student	San Isidro	Eliminated 7th
Gonzalo Mampel	28	Lawyer	Rosario	Eliminated 8th
Julia Debicki	19	Makeup artist	Wilde	Eliminated 9th
Elsa Cáseres	66	Retired	Villa Rumipal	Eliminated 10th
Hernán Lambertucci	37	Bachelor of administration	Rosario	Runner-up
Gastón Salas	20	Student	Comodoro Rivadavia	Winner

=== Challenges ===
==== Episode 1: Premiere ====
Participant	Creative challenge (Celebration cake)	Technique challenge (12 cupcakes)	Outcome
Gonzalo	Opera	1º	Advance
Fabián	Bariloche	2º	Advance
Hernán	Chef hat	3º	Starbaker
Candela	40th birthday	4º	Advance
Gabriel	Rainbow	5º	Nominated
Juan	Silver wedding anniversary	6º	Eliminated
Elsa	Gold wedding anniversary	7º	Second best baker
Agostina	Easter	8º	Advance
Marcela	Olghi	9º	Advance
Julia	Colors	10º	Advance
Lorena	Ballet dancer	11º	Nominated
Gastón	Purse	12º	Advance

==== Episode 2: Meringue ====
Participant	Creative challenge (Pies)	Technique challenge (Pavlova)	Outcome
Gonzalo	Chocolate and forest fruits	1º	Advance
Julia	Raspberry and maracuja	2º	Advance
Gabriel	Raspberry and lime	3º	Starbaker
Marcela	Chocolate, almonds, lemon and forest fruits	4º	Advance
Gastón	Chocolate, lemon and forest fruits	5º	Advance
Hernán	Champagne and raspberry	6º	Nominated
Lorena	Chocolate and grapefruit	7º	Eliminated
Fabián	Pistachio, pear and apple	8º	Second best baker
Candela	Black chocolate	9º	Advance
Elsa	Pistachio, pear and grapefruit	10º	Advance
Agostina	Lemon and lime	11º	Nominated

==== Episode 3: Patisserie ====
Participant	Creative challenge (Lingots 8x2)	Technical challenge (Sacher cake)	Outcome
Gastón	White chocolate and forest fruits / Caramel and chocolate	1º	Advance
Marcela	White chocolate and maracuja / Chocolate, raspberry and strawberrie	2º	Advance
Hernán	Dulce de leche and chocolate / Vanilla, cheese and quince	3º	Starbaker
Julia	Chocolate and orange mousse / Chocolate and cherry	4º	Second best baker
Gabriel	Meringue, vanilla and lemon / Chocolate and hazelnut	5º	Advance
Gonzalo	Strawberry and pistachios / White chocolate, piña colada and coconut	6º	Advance
Agostina	Chocolate, coffee and orange / White chocolate, lavender and berries	7º	Advance
Elsa	Maracuja mousse / Chocolate and hazelnut mousse	8º	Nominated
Fabián	Chocolate and peach / Chocolate, lavender, champagne and raspberry	9º	Nominated
Candela	Chocolate brownie / Maracuja mousse	10º	Eliminated

==== Episode 4: Cookies ====
Participant	Creative challenge (Cookie tower)	Technical challenge (Alfajores)	Outcome
Gastón	Eiffel tower	1º	Starbaker
Julia	Eiffel tower	2º	Advance
Hernán	Poker cards	3º	Second best baker
Agostina	Christmas tree	4º	Advance
Gonzalo	Set of bars	5º	Nominated
Gabriel	Pastry house	6º	Nominated
Fabián	Church	7º	Advance
Elsa	Chapel	8º	Advance
Marcela	House	9º	Eliminated

==== Episode 5: Desserts ====
Participant	Creative challenge (Flan / Mousse / Triffle)	Technical challenge (Charlotte tiramisu)	Outcome
Julia	Irish cream / Banana and avocado / Banana, cream and dulce de leche	1º	Starbaker
Gastón	Coconut and dulce de leche / Banana and maracuja / Almonds, mascarpone and strawberries	2º	Advance
Hernán	Dulce de leche and chocolate / Maracuja and white chocolate / Arroz con leche and nuts	3º	Second best baker
Gonzalo	Dulce de leche / Semibitter chocolate / Yoghurt, vanillas and sesame	4º	Nominated
Fabián	Cherry / Kirch / Chocolate, nuts and cream	5º	Eliminated
Agostina	Dulce de leche and Irish cream / Banana and maracuja / Mascarpone, yoghurt and orange	6º	Advance
Elsa	Orange / 2 chocolates / Anise pastry cream and cardamom	7º	Advance
Gabriel	Chocolate and cardamom / Caramel toffee and Belgian chocolate / Vanilla and cream	8º	Nominated

==== Episode 6: Fruits ====
Participant	Creative challenge (Naked cake)	Technical challenge (Apple strudel)	Outcome
Agostina	Coconut spongecake filled with maracuja diplomata cake decorated with strawberries and blueberries	1º	Starbaker
Julia	Pineapple, coconut and rhum spongecake filled with coconut cream and pineapple jam decorated with flowers and fruits	2º	Advance
Elsa	Sacher spongecake filled with custard cream and hazelnut cream and decorated with fruits mix	3º	Nominated
Gastón	Chocolate spongecake filled with mascarpone, berries, ganache and peach jam and decorated with flowers and fruits	4º	Second best baker
Gonzalo	Lemon and poppies spongecake filled with lemon cream and fruits concasse decorated with fruits and aguaribay leaves	5º	Advance
Gabriel	Orange and poppies spongecake filled with mango buttercream, bitter cream and grenadine	6º	Eliminated
Hernán	Cream cheese, orange and poppies spongecake filled with orange pastry cream and decorated with macarons and fruits	7º	Nominated

==== Episode 7: Argentina ====
- Since this episode was 3 challenges. 2 creatives and 1 technical

Participant	Creative challenge 1 (Bread basket)	Technical challenge (Balcarce cake)	Creative challenge 2 (World cup)	Outcome
Gonzalo	Raw ham, cherry tomatoes and reggiano cheese	1º	2018 FIFA World Cup	Nominated
Gastón	Tomatoes, leek, onion and brie cheese	2º	2014 FIFA World Cup	Second best baker
Agostina	Smoked bacon and mar del plata cheese	3º	Moscow cathedral	Eliminated
Julia	Bacon pork rinds	4º	World Cup host countries	Starbaker
Hernán	Provolone and grill sausage	5º	Mano de Dios	Nominated
Elsa	Black olives and olive	6º	1978 FIFA World Cup	Advance

==== Episode 8: Chocolate ====
Participant	Creative challenge 1 (Printed rolled)	Technical challenge (Souffle)	Creative challenge 2 (Chocolate mousse)	Outcome
Elsa	Countryside flowers	-º	Pistachio / Orange rolled / Meringue	Starbaker
Gastón	Animal print	-º	Citrus / Velvet bonbons / Mirror	Second best baker
Gonzalo	Milo Locket	-º	Crumble / Orange palete / Mirror and chocolate figures	Eliminated
Hernán	Streaped motif	-º	Nuts base / Coffee and whisky mousse / Mirror	Nominated
Julia	Britto Romero	-º	Raspberries biscuit / Chocolate and raspberries gallet / Mirror	Nominated

- No enumeration in technical challenge

==== Episode 9: Semifinal ====
Participant	Creative challenge 1 (Special dessert)	Technical challenge (Dacquoise)	Creative challenge 2 (Building)	Outcome
Hernán	Squash and coconut bavarois / Dates hearts / Nuts crumble and white chocolate quenelle / Special English sauce	1º	Pumps and éclairs of pastry cream, dulce de leche and lemon cream / White and black chocolate craquelin / Macarons and caramel	Finalist
Elsa	Poppies biscuit / Cheese and chocolate mousses / Raspberry and tomato jam / Glazed carrot	2º	Profiteroles with colors craquelin and éclairs with pastry cream and hazelnut / Italian fried past	Finalist
Julia	Carob base / Beetroot and white chocolate mousse / Raspberry center / Berries coulis and lime cream	3º	Eclairs covered in white chocolate and profiteroles filled with lemon pastry cream / Colors craquelin / Macarons and ganache	Eliminated
Gastón	Nuts spongecake / Squash and raspberries mousse / Vanilla center / White chocolate sauce with caramelized beetroot	4º	Pumps and éclairs with pastry cream and craquelin / Macarons / Caramel figures	Finalist

==== Episode 10: 3rd place definition ====
Participant	Creative challenge 1 (Hidden cake)	Technical challenge (Mirror cake)	Outcome
Gastón	Bake Off Argentina	1º	Advance to final challenge
Hernán	Mickey Mouse	2º	Advance to final challenge
Elsa	Hearts	3º	Eliminated - 3rd classified

==== Episode 11: Final ====
Participant	Creative challenge 2 (The grand finale cake)	Outcome
Gastón	Family	Winner
Hernán	H	Finalist

== 2nd season (2020) ==
The second season was premiered March 1 and last aired July 5, 2020. The filming took place in Pilar, Buenos Aires.

=== Contestants ===
Contestant	Age	Occupation	Hometown	Status
Leandro Molcar	34	Hostel employee	Venezuela	Eliminated 1st
Rita Piacentini	64	Retired	Recoleta	Eliminated 2nd
Gabriel Maceiras	49	Administrative employee	General Pacheco	Eliminated 3rd
Raquel Zanewczyk	38	Administrative employee	Burzaco	Eliminated 4th
Martina di Saia	23	Student	Ushuaia	Eliminated 5th
Marcos Perren	19	Enterprising	Florida	Eliminated 8th / 9th
Sonia Berwanger	51	Tourism technician	Corrientes	Eliminated 10th
Carolina Tannoni	26	Special education student	San Miguel de Tucuman	Eliminated 7th / 11th
Gerardo Dominguez	42	Administrative employee	Mendoza	Eliminated 6th / 12th
Ángelo Pedrazzoli	19	Student	Gualeguay	Eliminated 13th
Agustina Fontenla, Agus	29	Lawyer	San Antonio Oeste	Eliminated 14th
Agustina Guz	30	Sommelier	Ramos Mejia	Eliminated 15th
Samanta Casais	29	Administrative and baker	San Telmo	Runner-up (Disqualified)
Damián Pier Basile	30	Commerce employee	Rosario	Winner

=== Technical and creative challenges ===
==== Episode 1: Premiere ====
Contestant	Creative challenge (Animal cake)	Technique challenge (Chocolate marquise)	Outcome
Gabriel	Tiger	1º	Advance
Ángelo	Dog	2º	Advance
Sonia	Yacare	3º	Starbaker
Rita	Lamb	4º	Advance
Marcos	Bear	5º	Advance
Agus	Penguin	6º	Second best baker
Gerardo	Panda bear	7º	Advance
Samanta	Dog	8º	Advance
Agustina	Cow	9º	Advance
Leandro	Horse	10º	Eliminated
Carolina	Trout	11º	Advance
Damián	Cat	12º	Advance
Martina	Deer	13º	Nominated
Raquel	Octopus	14º	Nominated

==== Episode 2: American pastry ====
Contestant	Creative challenge (Cheese cake)	Technical challenge (Red velvet)	Outcome
Samanta	Mango and yoghurt with ginger and lemon cookies base covered with jelly and mango sheets	1º	Second best baker
Gerardo	Grapefruit cheese with cardamom dough and reduction of wine with figs, grapes and damascus	2º	Advance
Damián	Cheese with peanut butter, cacao crumble and peanut covered with salted caramel sauce decorated with marroc and caramelized	3º	Starbaker
Agustina	Blue cheese mousse with sablee base and wine pears sauce	4º	Advance
Martina	Cream cheese flavoured with cinnamon with sablee base and burgundy pear sauce	5º	Nominated
Ángelo	Cream cheese and white chocolate with coconut crumble and maracuja sauce	6º	Advance
Carolina	Caramelized cream cheese with caramelized popcorn crocant and chocolate ganache with popcorn truffles	7º	Advance
Agus	Orange cream with coconut and piña colada with grated coconut base and fresh fruit coverage, white chocolate and coconut scales	8º	Advance
Gabriel	Cheese with blueberries with vanilla flavored sandblasting and raspberries sauce with berries	9º	Nominated
Raquel	Ron cream cheese, sablee base covered with pineapple and pears compote and decorated with caramelized pears	10º	Advance
Marcos	Banana flavoured cheese with nuts dacqouise, banana cream and caramel figures and toffee coverage	11º	Advance
Sonia	Chocolate flavoured cream cheese, chocolate with almonds coverage with almonds praline and orange shell decorated with chocolate rack	12º	Advance
Rita	Newyorker with crispy base of chocolate, cream cheese and lemon curd	13º	Eliminated

==== Episode 3: Argentinian pastry ====
Contestant	Creative challenge (Churros)	Technical challenge (Pastafrola)	Outcome
Damián	Coffee churros filled with custard cream and cream cheese covered with cappuccino mousse	1º	Advance
Samanta	Classic churros filled with salted caramel sauce covered with chocolate and toasted peanut	2º	Advance
Ángelo	Churros filled with chocolate cream and vanilla covered with pink chocolate and chopped almonds	3º	Second best baker
Agus	Orange flavoured churros and orange juice filled with tangerine cream and chocolate with pistachios coverage	4º	Starbaker
Marcos	Churros filled with mango sauce covered with chocolate decorated with chantilly cream and mango	5º	Nominated
Gerardo	Churros flavored with cardamom filled with rosehip curd and covered with white chocolate and decorated with dissected petals	6º	Advance
Martina	Carob churros filled with sweat potato and curry cream decorated with white chocolate threads	7º	Advance
Carolina	Chocolate churros filled with orange cream covered with bitter chocolate decorated with orange cascarita	8º	Nominated
Agustina	Pink churros filled with raspberry and cardamom cream covered with white chocolate ganache decorated with chopped pistachios and raspberries	9º	Advance
Sonia	Cinnamon and Jamaica pepper churros filled with cream cheese and decorated with caramel	10º	Advance
Gabriel	Churros filled with peanut butter and chocolate, semicovered in white chocolate and decorated with grains	11º	Eliminated
Raquel	Churros filled with raspberry cream covered with chocolate and decorated with nuts crocant	12º	Advance

==== Episode 4: Trending pastry ====
Contestant	Creative challenge (Cookie cake)	Technical challenge (20 crepes cake)	Outcome
Agus	Sablee dough with lemon curd and white chocolate, covered with coconut cream decorated with berries, macarons and gold sheets	1º	Second best baker
Damián	Chocolate and almonds cookie filled with bariloche cream, buttercream, berries and bonbons	2º	Advance
Agustina	Chocolate dough filled with custard cream covered with buttercream, decorated with strawberries and gum paste hearts	3º	Starbaker
Martina	Chocolate sablee filled with beer pastry cream covered with mango curd decorated with leaves and flowers of gum paste	4º	Nominated
Samanta	Almonds dough filled with chocolate cream covered with maracuja ganache decorated with flowers, grains, gum paste leaves and chocolate	5º	Advance
Ángelo	Almonds and cardamom dough, filled with chocolate ganache and roasted bananas covered with Italian meringue and cognac	6º	Advance
Sonia	Caramel and almonds dough covered with coffee cream and rhum filled with almonds cream decorated with chocolate, strawberries and caramel	7º	Advance
Raquel	Almonds sablee filled with sour cream covered with matcha cream decorated with blueberries, grains, flowers, truffles and macarons	8º	Eliminated
Gerardo	Lemon dough filled with zabaione cream covered with tangerine cream decorated with strawberries, raspberries, mint, grains and flowers	9º	Advance
Marcos	Chocolate sablee filled with lemon mousse covered with meringue decorated with chocolate shavings, berries and strawberries	10º	Advance
Carolina	Almonds cookies filled with lemon and condensed milk, covered with meringue decorated with blueberries, strawberries and comestible flowers	11º	Nominated

==== Episode 5: Italian pastry ====
Contestant	Creative challenge (Panna cotta)	Technical challenge (Cannolis)	Outcome
Samanta	Squash base accompanied with orange sauce and goat ricotta cheese guarnition	1º	Starbaker
Agus	Mascarpone cheese base accompanied with salted caramel sauce with caramelized pear and nuts guarnition	2º	Advance
Agustina	Tea base accompanied with orange tuile and chocolate English sauce	3º	Advance
Ángelo	Caramel and vanilla base accompanied with coconut sandblasting and bitter chocolate sauce	4º	Second best baker
Marcos	Lemon capuccine and rhum base accompanied with chocolate sauce and caramelized hazelnuts guarnition	5º	Advance
Carolina	Coconut base accompanied with white chocolate and banana pudding croutons	6º	Advance
Damián	Pineapple and condensed milk base accompanied with coconut crumble, pineapple chunks and English cream	7º	Nominated
Sonia	Coconut and mango base accompanied with mango sauce with strawberries and coquitos guarnition	8º	Advance
Martina	Matcha tea base accompanied with chocolate sauce and tangerine segments guarnition	9º	Eliminated
Gerardo	Pistachio and orange base flavored with lavender accompanied with honey sauce and tangerine segments guarnition	10º	Nominated

==== Episode 6: English tea ====
Contestant	Creative challenge (7x3 cookies)	Technical challenge (Inverted citrus cake)	Outcome
Agustina	Lime and chocolate / Strawberries and basil compote / Almonds covered in chocolate	1º	Advance
Sonia	Orange, chocolate and peppers / Yerba mate with panela candy / Raspberries covered in chocolate	2º	Nominated
Ángelo	Pistachios cookies / Hazelnut and peanut butter / Almonds, orange and chocolate	3º	Advance
Samanta	Raspberries and pistachios / Covered in chocolate / Filled with coffee	4º	Advance
Carolina	Coffee cookies / Vanilla filled with carrot jam / Nut covered in chocolate	5º	Advance
Agus	Nuts, dulce de leche and rhum / Almonds cookies / Covered in chocolate	6º	Advance
Marcos	Lemon cookies / Filled with orange / Tangerine semicovered in chocolate	7º	Advance
Damián	Pistachio and chocolate / Orange and cocoa with almonds / Hazelnut polvorones covered in chocolate	8º	Nominated
Gerardo	Coconut cookies / Carob and cashew chestnuts filled with orange cream and covered in chocolate / Crackles of cocoa	9º	Eliminated

- In this episode there was no Starbaker because none of the contestants managed to pass two challenges

==== Episode 7: Flowers and fruits ====
Contestant	Creative challenge (Split open cake)	Technical challenge (Fruital verrine)	Outcome
Samanta	Lemon pudding filled with chocolate mousse and lemon curd	1º	Advance
Ángelo	Poppies and orange spongecake filled with lemon pastry cake and white chocolate with chocolate ganache with berries compote	2º	Nominated
Sonia	Lemon spongecake filled with pistachio cream, white chocolate and mascarpone pastry cream	3º	Advance
Damián	White wine and fruit chunks filled with cream cheese and mango jam with kiwi jelly	4º	Starbaker
Marcos	Lemon spongecake filled with chantilly cream, cherry liqueur and berries compote	5º	Nominated
Agus	Chocolate pudding filled with chocolate and peanut ganache, cream cheese with banana and dulce de leche	6º	Second best baker
Agustina	Amaretti spongecake filled with quince, jerez and nuts with lemon cream and white chocolate	7º	Advance
Carolina	Vanilla spongecake filled with maracuja cream and fruits of the forest	8º	Eliminated

==== Episode 8: Thinking different ====
Contestant	Creative challenge (Crackled cake)	Technical challenge (Pionono vertical cake)	Outcome
Agus	Biscuit Joconde with chocolate and raspberry mousses, cocoa crackled and chocolate waist	1º	Second best baker
Samanta	Chocolate dough with mascarpone and coffee mousses and bitter cocoa crackled	2º	Starbaker
Damián	Nut dough with banana and yoghurt mousses and cocoa crackled	3º	Advance
Sonia	Almonds and pepper dough with chocolate and avocado and chocolate with milk mousses and cocoa crackled	4º	Nominated
Agustina	Lime dough with chocolate and cucumber mousses and cocoa crackled	5º	Advance
Ángelo	Biscuit Joconde with orange and chocolate mousses and cocoa crackled	6º	Nominated
Marcos	Orange sablee with pear and chocolate mousses and bitter cocoa crackled	7º	Eliminated

==== Episode 9: Repechage ====
- In this special episode, the 8 eliminated contestants enfrented in a repechage. Only 3 of them return to the tent

Contestant	Creative challenge (3x2 donuts)	Technical challenge (4 colors checkerboard cake)	Outcome
Carolina	X	Automatically returns	Return
Gerardo	Vanilla and poppies donuts filled with tomato jam covered with white chocolate and jalapeños / Carrot donuts filled with custard cream and nuts crocant	1º	Return
Gabriel	Donuts filled with lemon and berries covered with blue glazed / Donuts filled with custard cream and apple covered with chocolate	2º	No returns
Martina	Square donuts filled with chocolate, covered with dulce de leche and caramelized bananas / Square donuts filled with caramel covered with chocolate and peanut	3º	No returns
Raquel	Donuts filled with apple, cinnamon and peanut and honey covered with dulce de leche and raisins / Donuts filled with coconut pastry cream covered with chocolate and raspberries	4º	No returns
Marcos	Lemon filled donuts covered with colored meringue / Donuts filled with coffee and covered with classic meringue	5º	Returns
Rita	Donuts filled with diplomata cream covered with buttercream / Donuts filled with custard cream and berries, covered with chocolate and pistachios	6º	No returns
Leandro	X	7º (Automatically eliminated)	No returns

- Carolina automatically returns to the tent by being chosen by the contestants like the best in the technical challenge
- Leandro was automatically eliminated for having the worst performance in the technical challenge

==== Episode 10: Love ====
- Since this episode there is no second starbaker

Contestant	Creative challenge (Unlevelness love cake)	Technical challenge (Fruital pie)	Outcome
Agus	Citric pudding filled with chocolate and orange creamy and covered with pineapple and coconut buttercream	1º	Starbaker
Agustina	Ginger biscuit and cream cheese filled with tangerine cream, triple sec and chocolate decorated with gum paste	2º	Advance
Ángelo	Chocolate and orange spongecake filled with chocolate, mango, cheese and orange decorated with gum paste	9º	Nominated
Carolina	Chocolate spongecake filled with plum and thyme cream, diplomata cream, decorated with ganache and gum paste	9º	Nominated
Damián	Chocolate and beer spongecake filled with chocolate, tofu, almonds and chocolate with dulce de leche, decorated with buttercream	9º	Advance
Gerardo	Moist spongecake filled with chocolate, orange and buttercream with strawberries and blueberries	9º	Advance
Marcos	Vanilla spongecake filled with custard cream, raspberries and bariloche cream decorated with meringue	9º	Eliminated
Samanta	Coconut and lemon spongecake filled with white chocolate, coconut, rhum and buttercream of dulce de leche	9º	Advance
Sonia	Vanilla spongecake filled with cream cheese and chocolate, covered with gum paste	9º	Advance

- In this episode 7 of 9 contestants was in the last place in the technical challenge

==== Episode 11: Childhood ====
Participant	Creative challenge (Childhood cake)	Technical challenge (2x3 palettes)	Outcome
Samanta	Lollipops	1º	Advance
Damián	Chocolate egg	2º	Advance
Agustina	Apples	3º	Advance
Ángelo	Arroz con leche	4º	Starbaker
Carolina	Tocinito del cielo	5º	Nominated
Agus	Sky cream (Crema del cielo)	6º	Advance
Gerardo	Bonbons	7º	Nominated
Sonia	Strawberries	8º	Eliminated

==== Episode 12: Français pastry ====
Contestant	Creative challenge (Eclairs tower)	Technical challenge (Giant macaron)	Outcome
Damián	Craquelin éclairs of orange and carrot / Lemon éclairs covered with meringue	1º	Starbaker
Samanta	Eclairs filled with custard cream and apples / Filled with cheese cream and berries	2º	Advance
Agus	Filled with mousseline of pistachios covered in chocolate / Filled with saffron cream	3º	Advance
Gerardo	Cinnamon éclairs filled with cream cheese and lemon / Ginger éclairs filled with hazelnut cream and moscatel	4º	Nominated
Agustina	Filled with blackberries and mascarpone covered in chocolate / Filled with dulce de leche and nuts	5º	Advance
Ángelo	Filled with white chocolate ganache and covered with chocolate / Raspberries covered in chocolate	6º	Nominated
Carolina	Filled with cream cheese and bacon / Filled with white chocolate and blueberries	7º	Eliminated

==== Episode 13: Vanguardist ====
- Since this episode there are going to be three challenges. 2 creative and 1 technical

Contestant	Creative challenge 1 (No conventional flavours)	Technical challenge (Fraisier cake)	Creative challenge 2 (Classic reversion)	Outcome
Samanta	Avocado and cream cheese, Nuts, cinnamon and salt crumble, Spicy truffles with avocado, chocolate and dates	1º	Lemon pie in dome shape	Starbaker
Damián	Chocolate and lentils filled with white chocolate cream, fernet and diplomata cream of lime, lemon and basil	2º	Apple crumble in mirror shape	Advance
Ángelo	Orange sablee with chocolate and jalapeños mousse, Corn palete center covered with orange gelee	3º	Disintegrated selva negra	Advance
Agus	Cheesecake with nuts sablee filled with ricotta, squash, pumpkin and papaya flavored with cinnamon	4º	Disintagrated balcarce cake	Nominated
Agustina	Brie cheese panna cotta and orange triple sec, tomato and garlic jam, olive oil biscuit decorated with fried basil	5º	Tiramisu in shape of cloud	Nominated
Gerardo	Cake with squash dough filled with beets and rosemary decorated with salt and caramelized tomato	6º	Lemon pie shape bridge	Eliminated

==== Episode 14: Chocolate ====
Contestant	Creative challenge 1 (Textures)	Technical challenge (Chocolate volcano)	Creative challenge 2 (40 cm structure)	Outcome
Agustina	5 textures: With almonds / Mousse with haba tonka / Ganache with elder / Sablee with almonds / Sauce	1º	Champagne bottle	Starbaker
Damián	4 textures: Brownie with nuts and banana / Whipped cream / Slabs / Truffles	2º	Flag monument	Nominated
Ángelo	5 textures: Bavarois / English cream with crocant / Nibs with almonds / Crumble / Chocolate curlers	3º	Obelisco of Buenos Aires	Eliminated
Samanta	5 textures: Panna cotta with cherry liqueur / Chocolate land / Crocant / Nibs / Sauce	4º	Suitcase	Advance
Agus	7 textures: Sablee / Custard cream / Mousse / Beggar with quinoa and blueberries / Velvet / Shavings / Nibs	5º	Lighthouse	Nominated

- In this episode, the contestants started cooking with 10 minutes of difference in the technical challenge because the chocolate volcano eats hot

==== Episode 15: First semifinal ====
Contestant	Creative challenge 1 (6x2 petit fours)	Technical challenge (Petit gateau)	Creative challenge 2 (Gravity 0 cake)	Outcome
Agus	Mini pies with almonds dough filled with tangerine decorated with flambéed meringue / Pear crumble with Chantilly cream and chocolate	-º	Hamburger	Advance
Agustina	Pistachio sablée with lime cream and white chocolate with raspberries / Cookie cakes with chocolate	-º	Popcorn	Advance
Damián	Almonds pionono filled with cream cheese. Coffee and liqueur sauce / Carrot cake with cream and coconut	-º	Pig	Advance
Samanta	Financieros with strawberry and chocolate / Blue velvet with blueberries filled with cream cheese	-º	Owl	Advance

- In this episode no one was eliminated
- No enumeration in technical challenge
- Gaston Salas, first season winner, was the 4th judge in the 2nd creative challenge

==== Episode 16: Second semifinal ====
- In this episode the judge was the encharged of the challenges

Participant	Creative challenge 1 (Floating island - Pamela)	Technical challenge (Paris-Brest Cake - Cristophe)	Creative challenge 2 (16x3 bonbons - Damian)	Outcome
Damián	Floating island filled with maracuja cream, cocoa sablee, chantilly cream and decorated with fresh fruit and chocolate figures	1º	Golden bonbons with chocolate, coffee and cookie / White chocolate bonbons with lemon, rhum and raspberries / Moons and stars with Moroccan and praline	Finalist
Samanta	Chocolate floating island filled with diplomata cream, berries compote and zabaione sauce with marsala	2º	Pink bonbons filled with champagne and blueberries crumble / White bonbons filled with mango and maracuja / Chocolate leaves with peanut and honey	Finalist
Agus	Coconut floating island filled with lemon cream, Oporto zabaione sauce, Turkish figs and almonds crocant	3º	Chocolate hearts with rhum, piña colada and curry / Cookies and salted caramel pyramids / White chocolate bonbons filled with lime and yoghurt	Eliminated
Agustina	Floating island flavored with vanilla filled with salted caramel. Whisky zabaione sauce, fruits, almonds and isomalt	4º	Dulce de leche semispheres with nuts liqueur and crumble / White chocolate hearts filled with raspberries / Ganache pyramids flavored with prosecco	Finalist

==== Episode 17: Third place definition ====
Participant	Creative challenge 1 (Chocolate sphere)	Technique challenge (Opera cake)	Outcome
Samanta	Semibitter chocolate sphere with a cacao sablee and creme brûlee with pears interior	1º	Advance to final challenge
Agustina	White chocolate sphere with a coconut dacqouise and almonds with maracuja cream, strawberries and mint interior	2º	Eliminated - 3rd finalist
Damián	Marmolade chocolate sphere with a ricotta tart, crumble and banana split quenelle	3º	Advance to final challenge

==== Episode 18: Final ====
Participant	Creative challenge 2 (My favorite artist cake)	Outcome
Damián	René Magritte	Winner
Samanta	Salvador Dalí	Disqualified

- Samanta was the winner but in 2020 July she was dethroned because, supposedly, she was a professional baker.

== 3rd season (2021) ==
The third season was premiered September 13. The filming took place in Pilar, Buenos Aires.

=== Contestants ===
Contestant	Age	Occupation	Hometown	Status
Gabriel Amato	52	Taxi driver	Berisso	Eliminated 1st
Belén Pérez	31	Teacher	Los Polvorines	Eliminated 2nd
Celeste Hernández	34	Degree in Tourism	Martínez	Eliminated 3rd
Gianlucca Ferrari Avella	19	Student	City of Buenos Aires	Eliminated 4th
Silvina Santarelli	41	Accountant	Hudson	Eliminated 5th
Gino Minnucci	22	Student	Peréz Millán	Eliminated 6th
Paula Paternoster	29	Administrative employee	City of Buenos Aires	Eliminated 7th
Hernán Canalini	35	Architect	La Plata	Eliminated 8th
Ximena Alfaro	20	Student	Mar del Plata	Eliminated 9th
Gisela Rossitto	31	Student	Rosario	Eliminated 10th
Emiliano Dibernardi	21	Administrative employee	Capitán Sarmiento	Eliminated 11th
Kalia Manzur	52	Painting teacher	Comodoro Rivadavia	Eliminated 11th
Facundo Tarditti	25	Student	Altos de Chipión	Runner-up
Carlos Martinic	29	Teacher	Río Grande	Winner

== Famosos season (2024) ==
=== Contestants ===
Contestant	Age	Occupation / Famous for	Status	Episode
Andrea Del Boca	58	Actress	Confirmed	
Ángela Leiva	35	Singer and actress	Confirmed	
Callejero Fino	29	Musician	Confirmed	
Candelaria Molfese	33	Actress and influencer	Confirmed	
Camila Homs	27	Model, ex-partner of Rodrigo De Paul	Confirmed	
Damián De Santo	56	Actor	Confirmed	
Eliana Guercio	46	Panelist and partner of Sergio Romero	Confirmed	
Marcos Milinkovic	52	Former volleyball player	Confirmed	
Mariano Iúdica	54	TV host	Confirmed	
Nacho Elizalde	35	Streaming host	Confirmed	
Verónica Lozano	54	TV host	Confirmed	
Gastón Edul	27	Sports journalist	3rd eliminated	Episode 4
Javier Calamaro	59	Musician	2nd eliminated	Episode 2
Karina Jelinek	43	Model	1st eliminated	Episode 1
