= Elsa Anka =

Spanish television presenter

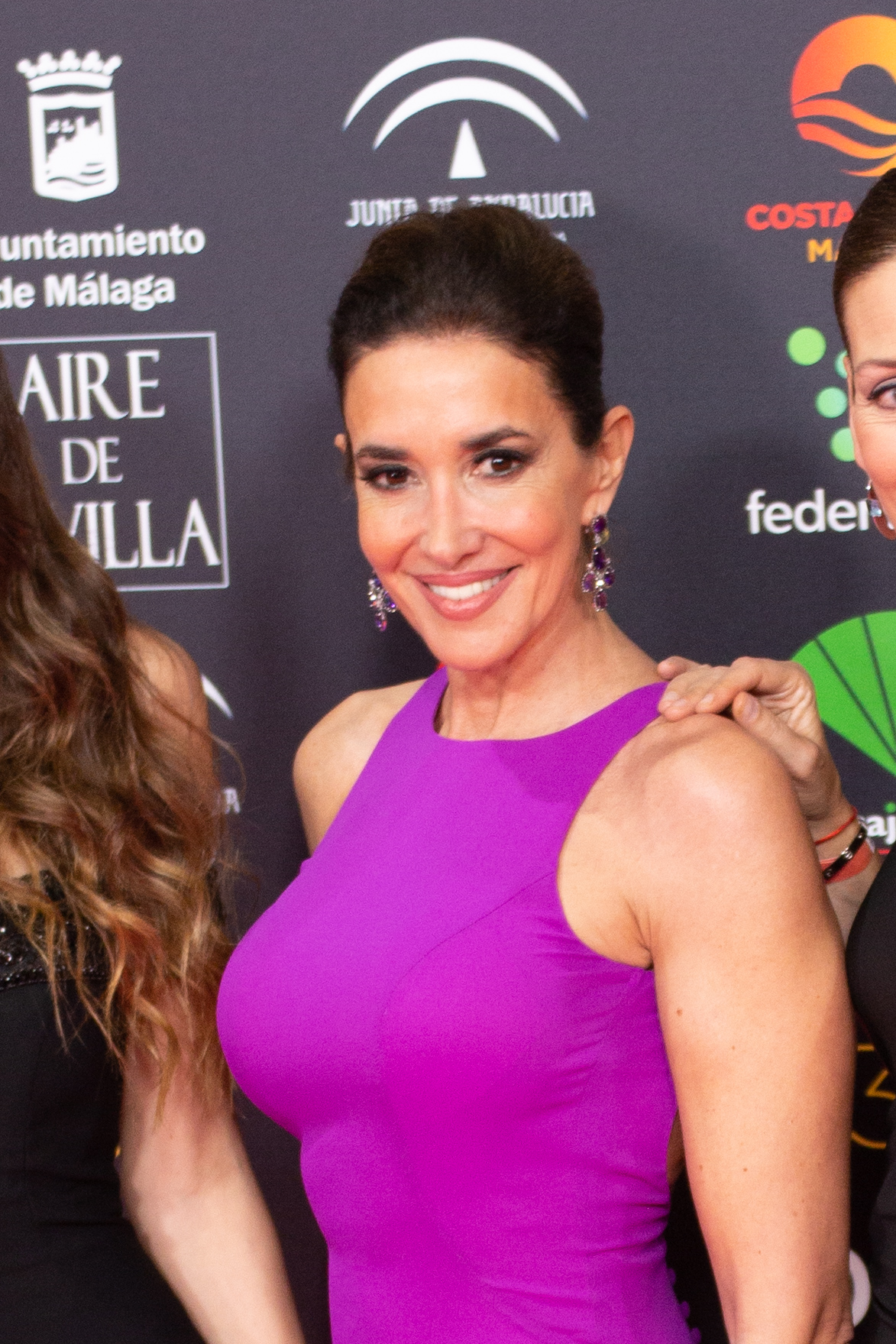
- Elsa Anka in 2020
- Born: María Elsa Anka Lardín; 16 December 1965 (age 60); Barcelona, Spain
- Occupation: Television presenter
- Years active: 1995–present

María Elsa Anka Lardín (born December 16, 1965, in Barcelona, Spain) is a Spanish television presenter.

== Biography ==
Although her professional beginnings were in the world of public relations, she made her first television appearances in 1986, playing small roles in the sketches of the TVE show Ahí te quiero ver.

Later, in 1990, she appeared on Antena 3 with Polvo de estrellas, and in 1993, she joined Emilio Aragón and Belén Rueda in the magazine Noche, noche. However, the program did not meet the expected audience ratings and was pulled from the air after a few months.

During the 1994–1995 season, she co–hosted the sports show El Friqui with Juan Manuel López Iturriaga on Telemadrid.

Also Persones humanes (1995–1996) on TV3, Sonría, por favor (1996), on Telecinco, Puerta a la fama (1996), on Telemadrid, El Gran Juego de la Oca (1998), on Telecinco and Todo en familia (1999) on TVE, El gran parchís TV (2001), on Telemadrid and El Show de los Números Rojos (2001) on Canal 9.

During that time, she also tried her luck as an actress and participated in the production of the play Torna-la a tocar, Sam by Woody Allen.

In 2003, she participated in the space La isla de los famosos of Antena 3 where she was the sixth expelled from the island with one of the highest percentages of the program, with 96% of the votes. Three years later, she appeared in the skating contest El desafío bajo cero, of Telecinco.

In February 2005, she starred on the cover of Interviú magazine, when it was celebrating its 1,500th issue.

Between 2007 and 2008, she presented the program Zapping de Zapping on 8TV, and at the same time, she collaborated on the program Condició Femenina on Canal Català.

In 2012, she worked as a presenter and introducer of a clairvoyant named Maestro João in a clairvoyance program. She also participates in the series Hospital Central, in chapter 291 "Al Central".

In January 2015, it was announced that she would be the new host of the program Perdona? on Canal BOM and RAC105 TV. In parallel, since December 2015, she has collaborated sporadically on the program Trencadís On 8TV. In May 2017, she started collaborating with Cazamariposas.

Her daughter, Lidia Torrent, works on the television program First Dates of Mediaset España among others.

In 2021, Mediaset España confirms Elsa Anka's participation in the docu–reality Los miedos de..., a program in which contestants try to overcome their fears by means of tests. She will work with journalists Lydia Lozano and Chelo García-Cortés, presenters Carlos Sobera, Boris Izaguirre and Toñi Moreno, singers Melody and Toñi Salazar and actors Loles León and Mario Vaquerizo.
