= Jocelyn Hattab =

French-Tunisian television presenter and writer

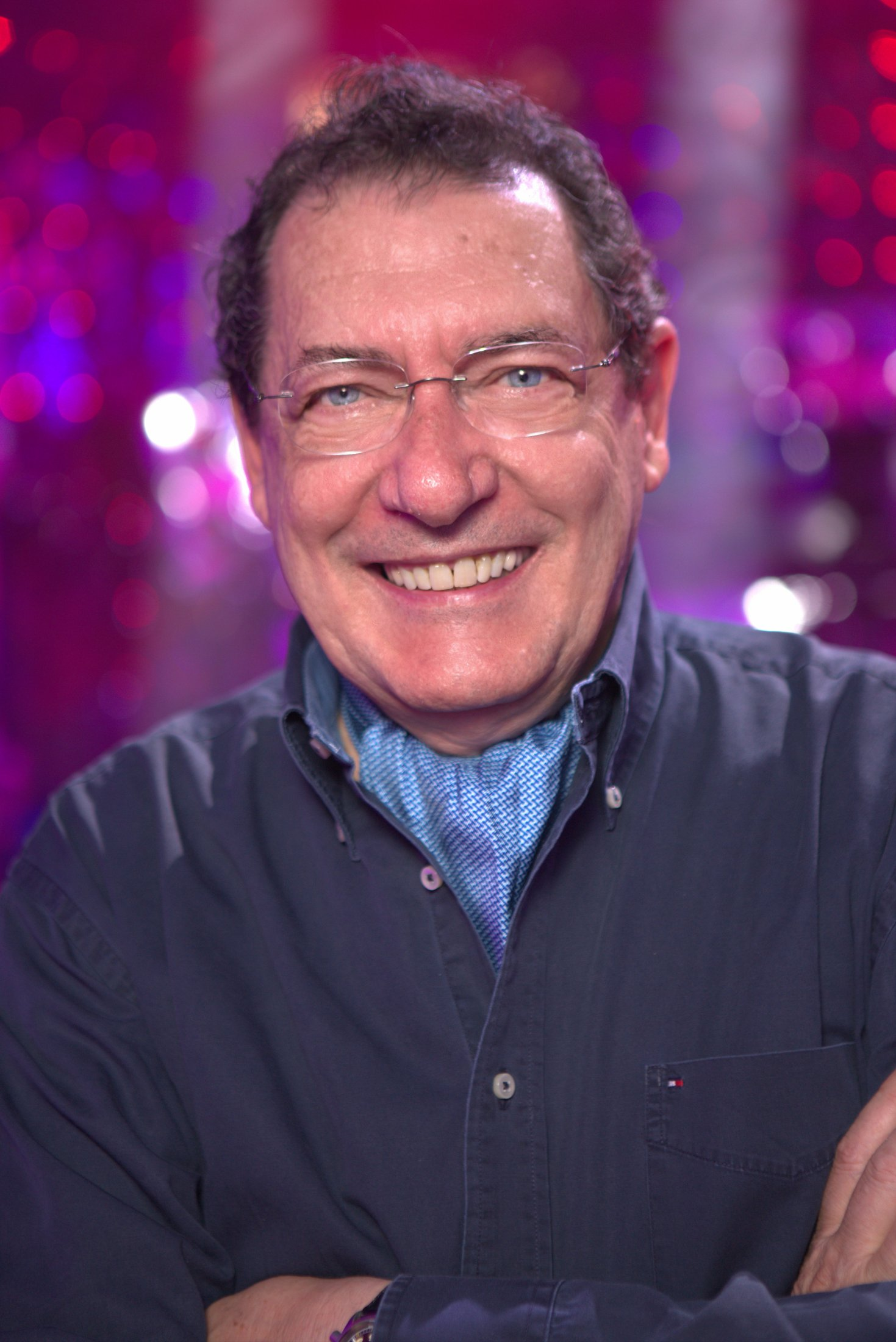
- Hattab in 2014
- Born: 5 December 1945 (age 80); Tunis, Tunisia
- Occupation: Presenter

Jocelyn Hattab (born 5 December 1945), also known with the mononym Jocelyn, is a French-Tunisian television presenter, television writer, director and singer, mainly active in Italy.

== Life and career ==
Born in Tunis into a family of Hebrew originis, Hattab relocated to Paris together with his family during his adolescence. He studied production and direction at the Conservatoire national supérieur d'art dramatique. He made his television debut on Telemontecarlo, with the musical show Un peu d’amour, d’amitié et beaucoup de musique, co-hosted with his then-wife Sophie Cauvigny.

In 1980, Hattab started collaborating with RAI, hosting the musical show Discoring. A television writer, he created successful formats, notably Il grande gioco dell'oca, which was sold in 42 franchise countries and regions. Other notable shows he created, hosted and often directed include Caccia al tesoro, Conto su di te!, Caccia all'uomo, Se io fossi Sherlock Holmes, Vita da cani and In bocca al lupo. Also a singer, he had several commercial hits in the second half of the 1970s.
