= Pepa Fernández =

Spanish journalist (born 1965)

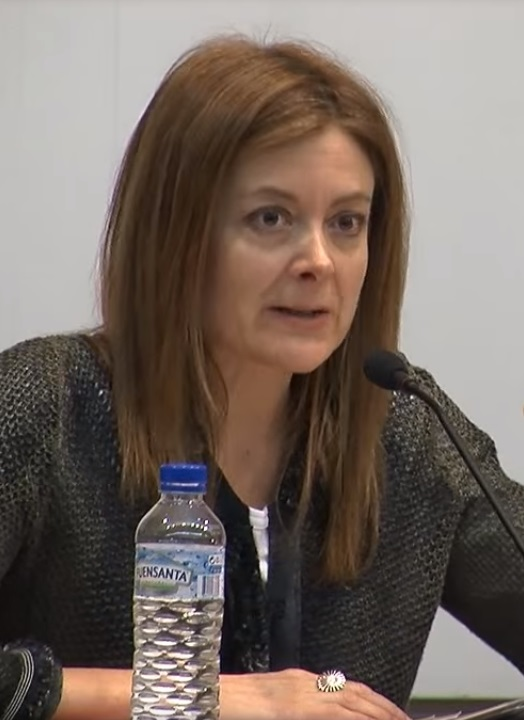
- Born: María José Fernández Vallés; 4 March 1965 (age 61); Cervera, Spain
- Education: Autonomous University of Barcelona
- Occupation: Journalist
- Employer: Radio Nacional de España
- Notable work: Journalist or host of: No es un día cualquiera; Las mañanas de RNE
- Awards: Ondas Award (2003, 2008); Miguel Delibes National Journalism Award (2015)

María José Fernández Vallés (born 4 March 1965), better known as Pepa Fernández, is a Spanish journalist. She is the director and presenter of the Radio Nacional de España (RNE) program No es un día cualquiera.

== Biography ==
Pepa Fernández was born in the town of Cervera, Lleida in 1965. Her father's family is from Ourense. At 18 she started working in radio. She earned a licentiate in Information Sciences from the Autonomous University of Barcelona. Since 1999, she has been directing and presenting the RNE program No es un día cualquiera, a weekend magazine which has received several awards.

She is a professor at Ramon Llull University's Faculty of Communication.

Fernández has worked on several television programs. She has written for the TV3 show El Club and currently appears on La mañana de la 1.

== Awards and recognitions ==
- 2002: Radio de Cambio 16 Award
- 2003: Ondas Award for Best Nationally Broadcast Radio Program for No es un día cualquiera
- 2007: Pica d'Estats Award
- 2008: Ondas Award for Professional Career
- 2009: Emilio Castelar Award for Effective Communication
- 2009: Micrófono de Oro
- 2010: El Cava Journalism Award
- 2013: Dionisio Duque Foundation Award for communication, innovation, and new technologies
- 2015: José Antonio Labordeta Award for Communication
- 2015: Miguel Delibes National Journalism Award
- 2016: Concha García Campoy Journalism Award
- Two Micrófonos de Plata from the Spanish Professional Association of Radio, Press, and Television News (APEI)
- Antena de Oro

== Books ==
- Lo que la vida enseña, Esfera de los Libros, 2008, ISBN 9788497347167
