= Montserrat Domínguez =

Spanish journalist (born 1963)

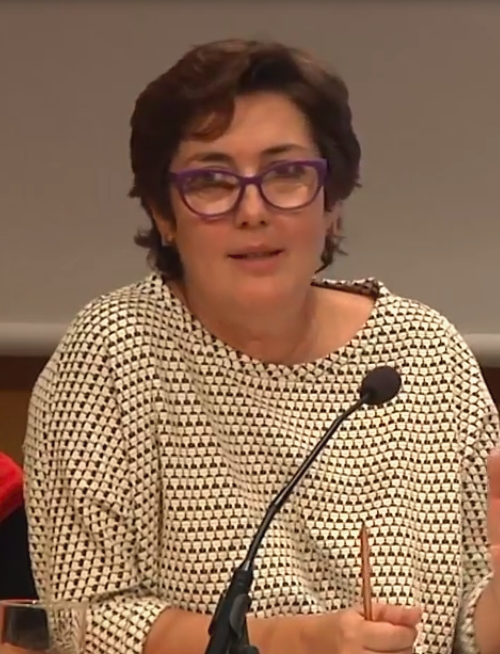
- Born: Montserrat Domínguez Montolí; 1963 (age 62–63); Madrid, Spain
- Education: Complutense University of Madrid (BA); Columbia University (MA)
- Occupation: Journalist
- Years active: 1987–present

Montserrat Domínguez Montolí (born 1963) is a Spanish journalist who has held senior editorial positions at several of Spain's major media outlets, including Telecinco, Antena 3, Cadena SER, El HuffPost España, and El País. She directed and presented the political talk show La mirada crítica on Telecinco from 2001 to 2004, for which she received the Salvador de Madariaga European Journalism Prize from the European Parliament. She was the founding editor of the Spanish edition of HuffPost (2012–2018) and later served as deputy editor of El País (2018–2021) and as content director of Cadena SER (2021–2025).

== Early life and education ==
Domínguez was born in Madrid in 1963. She graduated in journalism from the Faculty of Information Sciences at the Complutense University of Madrid. She subsequently obtained a Master's degree in Journalism from Columbia University in New York City in 1989–1990 as a Fulbright scholar.

== Career ==
=== Early career and Telecinco (1987–2004) ===
Domínguez began her journalism career in 1987 at the news department of Radio España. She later worked at Efe Radio, the radio division of the EFE news agency, and at Canal+.

In 1991, she joined Telecinco, where she spent thirteen years working as a reporter, presenter, and editor across various news programmes. From January 2001 to June 2004, she directed and presented the morning political talk show La mirada crítica, which featured interviews and debates with leading Spanish political figures. On 11 March 2004, she anchored Telecinco's live coverage of the 2004 Madrid train bombings, broadcasting for several hours as events unfolded.

=== Antena 3 (2004–2007) ===
In June 2004, Domínguez left Telecinco and joined Antena 3, where she directed and presented Ruedo ibérico, a morning political discussion programme, together with the station's morning news edition. The programme aired until December 2006, when it was replaced by the daily edition of Espejo público presented by Susanna Griso.

=== Cadena SER and A vivir que son dos días (2007–2012) ===
In September 2007, Domínguez joined Cadena SER as a special contributor. In November 2007, she was appointed director and presenter of A vivir que son dos días, the station's flagship weekend magazine programme, replacing Àngels Barceló, who had moved to lead Hora 25. She led the programme from January 2008 until May 2012, during which time it maintained its position as the audience leader in its time slot.

=== El HuffPost España (2012–2018) ===
In March 2012, Domínguez was named founding editor of El HuffPost (the Spanish edition of HuffPost), a joint venture between Prisa Noticias and The Huffington Post Media Group. She directed the digital publication for six years, until June 2018. During this period, she also contributed as a regular panellist on El programa de Ana Rosa on Telecinco and on La Ventana on Cadena SER.

=== El País (2018–2021) ===
In June 2018, Domínguez was appointed deputy editor of El País, where she oversaw the weekend edition, El País Semanal, and coordinated the newspaper's magazine supplements, including S Moda, Icon, Buena Vida, Retina, and Ideas.

=== Cadena SER content director (2021–2025) ===
In May 2021, Prisa Media appointed Domínguez as content director of Cadena SER, Spain's most listened-to radio network, as part of a broader restructuring of the company's radio division under new CEO Carlos Núñez. In this role, she coordinated the station's news, programming, and sports departments.

In May 2025, she was replaced by Fran Llorente, the former head of news at RTVE, as part of a restructuring ordered by Prisa president Joseph Oughourlian following the appointment of Pilar Gil as CEO of Prisa Media. Llorente assumed a newly created position titled Director of Editorial and Content for Radio and Audiovisual Business, while Jaume Serra was named general director of the radio division for Spain.

== Awards and recognition ==
In 2017, the Junta de Andalucía awarded Domínguez the Carmen Olmedo Checa Prize as part of the 20th edition of the Premios Meridiana, recognising her commitment to gender equality throughout her career in the media. She has also received the Salvador de Madariaga European Journalism Prize for her work on La mirada crítica and has served on the jury of the same prize in subsequent editions.
