= The List (2022 film) =

- Theatrical release poster
- Spanish: La lista
- Directed by: Michael J. Hardy
- Written by: Michael J. Hardy
- Produced by: Michael J. Hardy
- Starring: Fernando Abadie; Claudia Scavone; Nathan Haase; Javier Enciso; Héctor Silva; Jesús Pérez; Eduardo Cano
- Edited by: Alexander Aquino
- Music by: Martin De Lemos
- Production company: Miranda Producciones
- Release dates: October 7, 2022 (Marbella); January 12, 2024 (Paraguay)
- Countries: Paraguay; Argentina
- Languages: English; Spanish
- Budget: US$100,000

The List (Spanish: La lista) is a 2022 Paraguayan-Argentine thriller film directed and written by Michael J. Hardy. The film stars Fernando Abadie, Claudia Scavone, Nathan Haase, Javier Enciso, Héctor Silva, Jesús Pérez, and Eduardo Cano.

Before its premiere, the film was already declared of cultural interest in Paraguay.

== Synopsis ==
A wealthy exile family returns from the United States to reclaim their lives, after the fall of a brutal dictatorship. However, the new government accuses them of collaborating with the regime and the newcomers must survive a night without law. There are 12 hours that is granted to those who seek to take revenge by their own hands.

== Cast ==
- Fernando Abadie as Juan Torres
- Claudia Scavone as Gabi Torres
- Nathan Haase as Mark
- Javier Enciso as Crazy Man
- Héctor Silva as Judge Peña
- Jesús Pérez as El General
- Eduardo Cano as Commander López
- Lucia Baez as Monse

== Production ==
During an interview for "La Nación" on June 2, 2020, the director Michael J. Hardy revealed that the budget was around $100,000 and commented that the plot of "The List" took as inspiration his personal experiences during the period in which he served as an officer of the US Army and counterterrorism specialist in different parts of the world.

=== Filming ===
The principal photography began on February 25, 2020, in Asuncion, Paraguay and ended in mid-March of the same year.

== Release ==
Release of the film was delayed due to the COVID-19 pandemic. It had its world premiere on October 7, 2022 at the Marbella International Film Festival, then it was released commercially on January 12, 2023 in Paraguayan theaters nationwide. The List was a top release in Paraguay during its run, with theatrical attendance behind Avatar, Puss in Boots: The Last Wish and M3GAN, but consistently higher box office than The Fablemans, Terrifier 2, Perfect Game, Super Robots and Babylon.

== Awards ==
- Best Feature Film - New World Film Festival, Barcelona, Spain
- Best Feature Film - Sierra International Film Weekend, Santa Cruz, Bolivia
- Remi Silver Award, Best Foreign Film - Worldliest Houston International Film Festival, Houston, Texas
- Best Actor - Caracas Iberoamerican Film Festival, Venezuela
- Best Supporting Actor - Marbella International Film Festival, Spain, Thrills and Chills, Los Angeles; Oniros Film Awards, New York
- Best Trailer - Barcelona International Film Festival, Spain
- Best Music Video – LA Reel Film Festival, Los Angeles

In addition to several other awards, The List was an Official Selection in over a dozen other film festivals.
