= ¿Quién quiere ser millonario? (Spanish game show) =

Spanish quiz show

¿Quién quiere ser millonario? is the Spanish version of the quiz show Who Wants to Be a Millionaire? It has aired on Telecinco (1999–2001), Antena 3 (2005–2009; 2020–2022) and laSexta (2012; 2024–2025). It has been presented by Carlos Sobera (1999–2008), Antonio Garrido (2009), Nuria Roca (2012) and Juanra Bonet (2020–2025).

== Format ==
Each contestant is asked 15 questions of increasing difficulty for increasing sums of money. Each question is multiple choice, with four options, and each must be answered correctly for the contestant to be asked the next one. The fifteen questions are divided into three blocks of five, ending with the jackpot. Advancing into the next block secures a sum of money. If a wrong answer is given, the contestant leaves with the last secured amount of money.

The contestant has three "lifelines" (Spanish: Comodines) that they can use once each in the game. "50:50" eliminates two wrong answers so that only the right answer and a random wrong answer remain, "Ask the Audience" (Preguntar al público) takes a survey of what the studio audience believes to be the answer, and "Phone a Friend" (Llamar a un amigo) allows the contestant to make a 30-second telephone call to ask a friend the question.

== Money tree ==
Payout structure
Question number	Question value					
Question number	1999–2001	2002 (Unused)*	2005–2007	2008	2009	2020–2025
15 (12)	50,000,000 ₧ (€300,506.05)	€300,000	€1,000,000			
14 (11)	24,000,000 ₧ (€144,242.91)	€150,000	€300,000		€250,000	€300,000
13 (10)	12,000,000 ₧ (€72,121.45)	€75,000	€100,000		€75,000	€100,000
12 (9)	6,000,000 ₧ (€36,060.73)	€40,000	€50,000	€30,000	€25,000	€50,000
11 (8)	3,000,000 ₧ (€18,030.36)	€20,000	€25,000	€15,000	€12,000	€30,000
10 (7)	1,500,000 ₧ (€9,015.18)	€10,000	€15,000	€10,000	€6,000	€20,000
9 (6)	750,000 ₧ (€4,507.59)	€4,500	€10,000	€8,000	€5,000	€15,000
8 (5)	600,000 ₧ (€3,606.07)	€3,500	€6,500	€6,000	€4,000	€10,000
7 (4)	450,000 ₧ (€2,704.55)	€2,500	€4,000		€3,000	€5,000
6 (3)	350,000 ₧ (€2,103.54)	€2,100	€2,000			€2,500
5 (2)	300,000 ₧ (€1,803.04)	€1,800	€1,000			€1,500
4 (1)	150,000 ₧ (€901.52)	€900	€500			€750
3	75,000 ₧ (€450.76)	€450	€300		—N/a	€500
2	50,000 ₧ (€300.51)	€300	€200		—N/a	€250
1	25,000 ₧ (€150.25)	€150	€100		—N/a	€100
Milestone Custom milestone Top prize

== History ==
=== Debut on Telecinco (1999–2001) ===
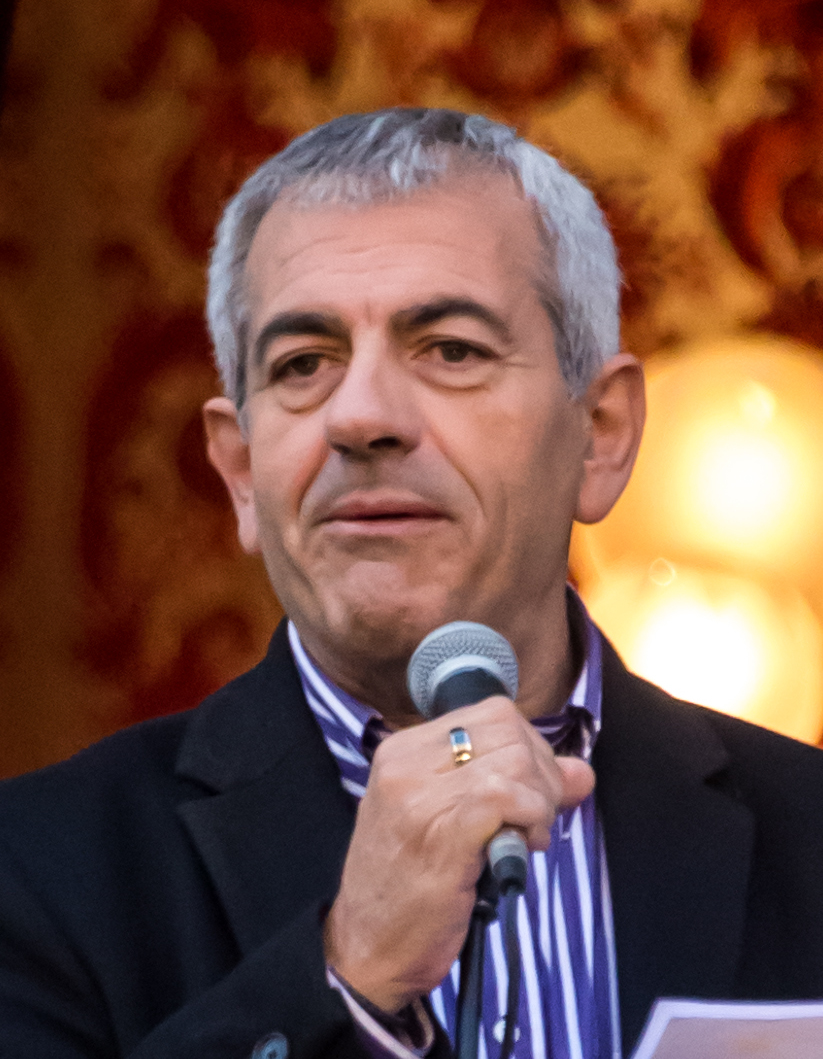
Carlos Sobera presented the show from 1999 to 2008

Under the original title of 50 por 15: ¿Quiere ser millonario? ("50 for 15: Do you want to be a Millionaire?", referring to the 15 questions and jackpot of 50 million Spanish pesetas), the show debuted on 17 September 1999 at 9 pm. It was presented by Carlos Sobera on Telecinco. This initial spell saw the show's only jackpot winner, Enrique Chicote of Barcelona, who won the sum roughly equal to €300,000. On the final question, he used the Phone a Friend lifeline to call his wife to inform her that he knew the final answer, namely that copra comes from a coconut. The show was cancelled in March 2001 to dedicate more time to Gran Hermano, the Spanish version of Big Brother. 50 por 15's audience share had peaked at around 29%.

=== Revival on Antena 3 (2005–2009) ===
The show was revived under its current name in July 2005, on Antena 3. Sobera returned as the host. With the discontinuation of the peseta, the prize was now €1,000,000. The show was commissioned as a temporary replacement, to fill a timeslot during a break on Pasapalabra, a game show then holding a 22% audience share. An innovation allowed for viewers to win up to €1,000 if they texted the right answer to a question that a contestant did not answer correctly. Sobera said that the revived show would be more fun and less rigid than the Telecinco edition.

In February 2007, the show was renewed for 2008, having achieved average audience shares of 20% and trailing only La Ruleta de la Suerte as Antena 3's most-watched show. After a break of 12 months, the show returned in May 2009 with the actor Antonio Garrido as the host.

=== Hotseat version on laSexta (2012) ===
In 2012, laSexta broadcast El Millonario, a hot seat format version of the show, presented by Nuria Roca. The programme had a €100,000 jackpot, no lifelines, and time limits on questions. It was broadcast from Monday to Friday, at 15:30. Roca won an Antena de Oro award for her work on the show.

=== Second revival (2020–2025) ===
In May 2019, Antena 3 announced that Juanra Bonet would host four special episodes to mark the show's 20th anniversary. On the third of these, noted game show winners took part, including Chicote; he won just €15,000 after taking a risk by reserving his Phone a Friend option. Garrido also returned, as a celebrity contestant in March 2021.

In March 2023, it was announced that the show would transfer to laSexta, also owned by Atresmedia. Retaining Bonet as host, the new series began in April 2024.
