= Christian Gálvez (TV presenter) =

Spanish TV presenter, actor, and writer

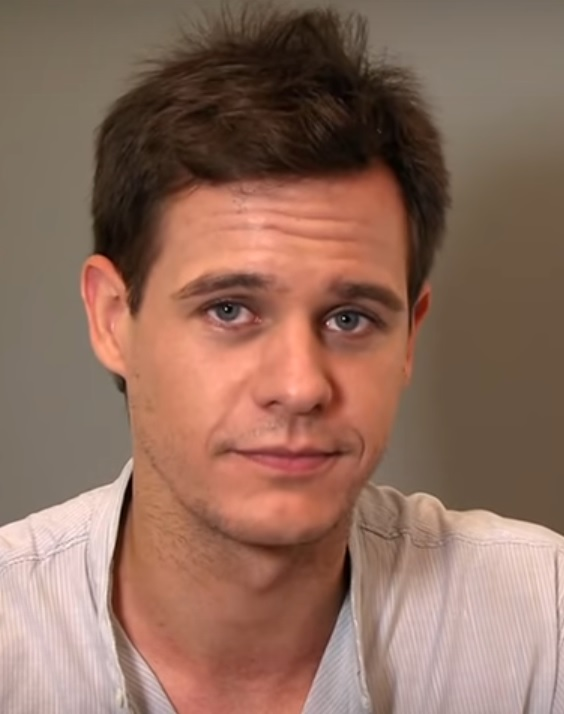
- Gálvez in 2013
- Born: Christian Gálvez Montero; 19 May 1980 (age 46); Móstoles, Madrid, Spain
- Spouse: Almudena Cid (2010–2022)
- Presenting career
- Show: Pasapalabra (2007–2019)
- Network: Telecinco
- Country: Spain
- Website: http://christiangalvez.com

Christian Gálvez (b. Móstoles, Madrid; 19 May 1980) is a Spanish television presenter, actor, amateur historian and writer.

== Biography ==
He studied English studies.

== Career ==
He began acting aged 15 in Médico de familia, and then in La casa de los líos (1996) and Al salir de clase (1998). Later on he presented TV programs such as Verano noche, Humor a toda marcha and Desperado Club Social between 1999 and 2002. He also dubbed the videogame Little Big Planet. He was known as a reporter on Caiga quien caiga (2005–2007), broadcast on Telecinco and presented by Manel Fuentes.

Before finishing Caiga quien caiga, he was chosen to present the game show Pasapalabra on 16 July 2007, which was previously aired on Antena 3, replacing Jaime Cantizano. He hosted the show for eleven years; the program received the highest ratings in Spain and was awarded for Premios Ondas (2008) and several TP de Oro. He combined Pasapalabra with other programs, like the reality show Operación Tony Manero (2008), Tú sí que vales (2008–2013), Supervivientes (2009–2011), El Reencuentro (2011) and Acorralados (2011).

In 2010 he published the book Sin-vergüenzas por el mundo, in which he describes his career as a reporter. In 2011 he starred in the film Ni pies ni cabeza alongside Jaydy Michel and Blanca Jara and directed by Antonio del Real.

In 2014 he voiced Napoléon Bonaparte in Assassin's Creed: Unity. On 2 April 2014 he published Matar a Leonardo da Vinci. In 2017, he was named global expert about Leonardo da Vinci and he will go on to exhume, recover his DNA and endeavour to reconstruct da Vinci's face.

In July 2015 he presented the talent show ¡Vaya fauna!, in which animals were the stars. Several animal associations sued the program after showing animals which cannot be domesticated so they would have been domesticated with physical maltreatment. The presenter Frank Cuesta uploaded a video on YouTube titled "Mensaje para Christian Gálvez", in which supported the associations and considering the program promoted animal cruelty. In that video, Cuesta requested Gálvez to state against the program, but Mediaset and Gálvez stated in favour.

On 17 March 2016 he published his second novel Reza por Miguel Ángel. In 2017 he published Leonardo da Vinci: cara a cara. In 2018 he published Gioconda descodificada—about the role of the women in Renaissance art.

From 2021 to 2022, Gálvez hosted the Saturday morning radio show De sábado con Christian Gálvez on Cadena 100. From 2021 to 2022 he also hosted Alta tensión, the Spanish adaptation of the American game show Wipeout. After its cancellation it was announced that Gálvez would host 25 palabras instead, the Spanish adaptation of the American game show 25 Words or Less.

== Personal life ==
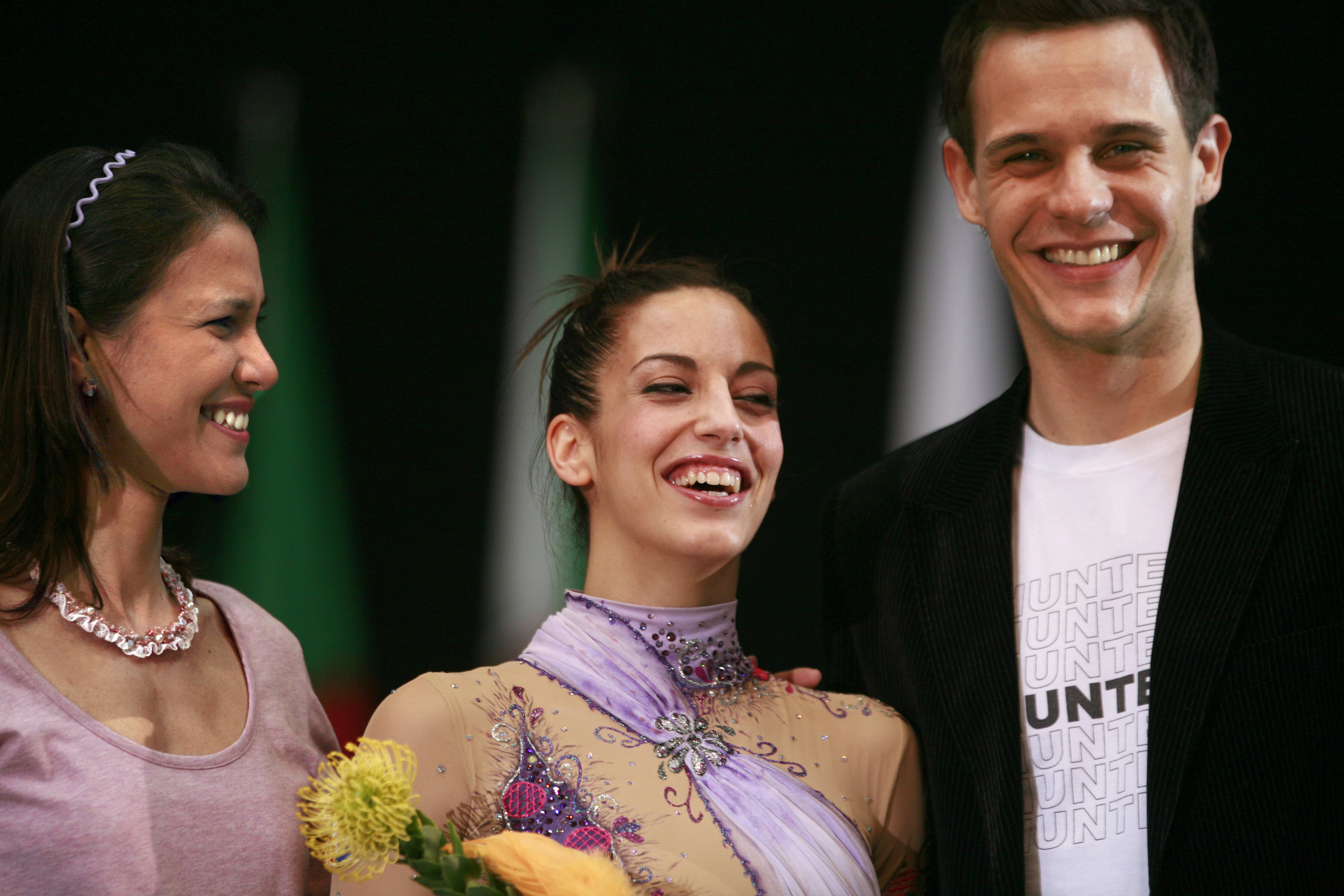
Christian alongside Almudena Cid at 2008 FIG Rhythmic Gymnastics World Cup Final in Portimão.

In 2010 he was the herald of La Línea de la Concepción and he received the honorary carnet for the Real Balompédica Linense.

In 2007 Gálvez met Almudena Cid in Pasapalabra, they dated for three years and were married on 7 August 2010 in Torrelodones, Madrid, by the mayor of Móstoles. Previously Gálvez was the partner of the Venezuelan model Veruska Ramírez from 2005 to 2006. Gálvez and Cid divorced in 2022.
