= Carlos Sobera =

Spanish actor, TV presenter and law lecturer

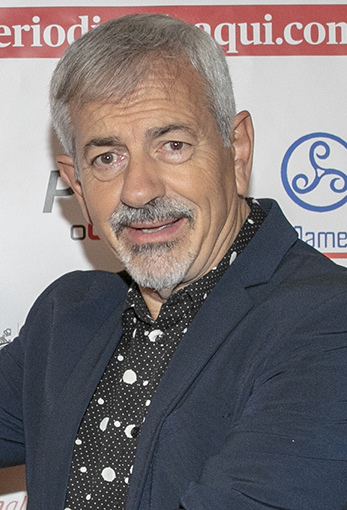
- Sobera in 2022.
- Born: Carlos Javier Sobera Pardo; 11 August 1960 (age 66); Barakaldo (Biscay), Spain
- Education: University of Deusto
- Occupations: Actor and television presenter
- Years active: 1995–present
- Height: 1.81 m (5 ft 11 1/2 in)
- Spouse: Patricia Santamarina
- Website: http://www.carlossobera.com/

Carlos Javier Sobera Pardo (born 11 August 1960 in Barakaldo, Spain) is a Spanish actor, television presenter and former law lecturer.

== Biography ==
Sobera has a law degree from the University of Deusto. He also was a professor of Civil Law at the University of the Basque Country, from 1987 to 1997. His first contact with the world of theater was in 1980 when he created, in his native Bilbao, a group called La Espuela. The group was active until 1986 and at that time staged La dama de alba by Alejandro Casona, Viva el Duque nuestro dueño by Alonso de Santos Balada de los tres inocentes by Pedro Mario Herrero.

In 1994 he began working for Euskal Telebista as the screenwriter of Boulevard, a talk show presented by Anne Igartiburu. In 1995 he was one of the creators of the game show Los jueves, mudanza, broadcast on Galicia's TVG. He debuted as a presenter on Euskal Telebista on the monthly programme Ciudadanos and then on daily show Arde la tarde.

In 1996 his film debut arrived when he starred, along with Imanol Arias, in Koldo Azkarreta's film Rigor Mortis. In 1997 he arrived to national television, presenting weekly show PC Adictos, the Spanish version of Telly Addicts, on La 2. However, his rise to fame came in his roles on TV series Al salir de clase and Quítate tú para ponerme yo, both on Telecinco.

In the late 1990s he became one of Telecinco's most successful faces, especially after he hosted 50×15, the Spanish version of Who Wants to Be a Millionaire? in April 1999. He also co-presented the 1999/2000 New Year bells on the network, with weather forecaster Mario Picazo. In 2008, he revealed that he had been asked to host Telecinco's hit Gran Hermano after the first departure of Mercedes Milá, but he declined.

In 2004 he jumped ship to Antena 3 to host ¿Hay trato?, the Spanish version of Let's Make a Deal, and the next year Antena 3 rebooted ¿Quién quiere ser millonario? with Sobera at the helm once again.

Since then, he became one of the most popular TV presenters in Spain, hosting shows such as Atrapa un millón on Antena 3. Since 2016, he has hosted First Dates (the Spanish adaptation of the British dating show of the same name) on Cuatro. From 2021, he hosted a daily edition of El precio justo, the Spanish version of The Price Is Right, on Cuatro and a weekly version on Telecinco, which was axed after a few months; in 2026, Sobera returned to the show when Telecinco started producing a daily daytime version. In 2026, he was hired to present Rueda la letra, a new teatime game show incorporating "El rosco", the original final round of Pasapalabra.

He is one of only two personalities to have hosted the New Year bells on all three of TVE, Antena 3 and Telecinco. As Cuatro now simulcasts Telecinco's coverage, he is the only person to have done so on four channels.

== Works ==
=== Theatre ===
- La dama de Alba, actor
- Viva el Duque nuestro dueño, actor
- Balada de los tres inocentes , actor
- Tres en raya, actor and director (1991)
- Palabras encadenadas, actor (2001)
- El club de la corbata, actor (2003)
- La Guerra de los Rose, actor (2010)

=== Films ===
- Rigor Mortis (1996).
- Lo mejor de cada casa (Una semana en el parque) (2000).
- ¡¡¡Hasta aquí hemos llegado!!! (2002).
- Pacto de Brujas (2002).
- El forastero (2002).
- El lápiz del carpintero (2002).

=== Television ===
==== As actor ====
- Quítate tú pa' ponerme yo (Telecinco, 1999).
- Al salir de clase (Telecinco, 1997–1999).
- El señorío de Larrea (ETB, 1999).
- Ana y los siete, (TVE, 2002).
- Paraíso, 1 capítulo (TVE, 2002).
- London Street (Antena 3, 2003)
- Mis adorables vecinos, (Antena 3, 2004).

==== Other ====
- Boulevard, as writer (ETB, 1994)
- La familia mudanza, as writer (TVG, 1995).
- Ciudadanos, presentador y guionista (ETB, 1995).
- Arde la tarde, (ETB, 1995).
- El Día D, (ETB, 1996).
- PC Adictos, (La 2, 1997).
- La gran evasión (ETB 2).
- Doble juego, presentador (FORTA, 2002)
- Date el bote, presentador (ETB 2, 2002–2009).
- ¿Quiere ser millonario? 50 por 15, presentador (Telecinco, 1999–2001).
- ¿Hay trato?, (Antena 3, 2004).
- El Supershow, (Antena 3, 2004).
- Números Locos, (Antena 3, 2005).
- ¿Quién quiere ser millonario?, presentador (Antena 3, 2005–2008).
- El show de los récords, (Antena 3, 2006).
- El invento del siglo, (Antena 3, 2006).
- 1 contra 100, (Antena 3, 2007).
- Jeopardy, (Antena 3, 2007).
- Canta! Singstar, (TVE 1, 2008)
- Los mejores años, (La 1, 2009)
- La lista, La 2, (2010)
- Como si fuera ayer, (7RM, 2010)
- Los Managers, Managers (Cuatro, 2010)
- Consumidores, (ETB 2, 2010–2011).
- Atrapa un millón, (Antena 3, 2011–2014)
- El tercero en discordia, (Antena 3, 2011)
- Avanti ¡que pase el siguiente!, (Antena 3, 2012)
- Cien x cien, (ETB 2, 2012)
- Increíbles: el gran desafío, (Antena 3, 2013)
- First Dates, (Cuatro, 2016–present)
- The Wall: Cambia tu vida, (Telecinco, 2017)
- Supervivientes (Telecinco, 2019–present)
- El precio justo (Telecinco/Cuatro, 2021, 2026–present)
- Rueda la letra (Telecinco, 2026–present)
