= Patricia Pérez (television presenter) =

Spanish television presenter

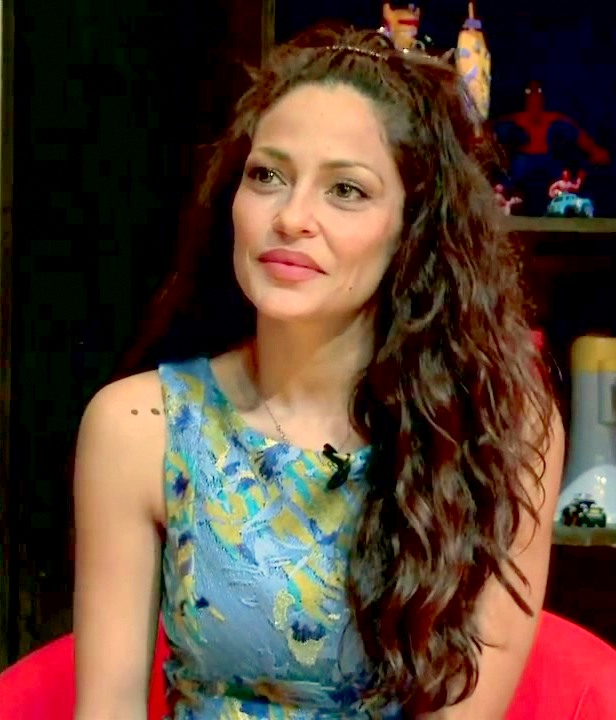
- Patricia Pérez in 2013
- Born: 5 December 1973 (age 52); Vigo, Spain
- Occupations: Television presenter, actress and writer
- Years active: 1992 - present

Patricia Pérez (Vigo, Spain, 5 December 1973) is a Spanish actress, presenter and writer. She became known in Spain, the United States and throughout Latin America for co-hosting the 1993 hit game show El Gran Juego de la Oca with Emilio Aragón and Lydia Bosch.

== Biography ==
She began her career at TVG, presenting the program Luar with Xosé Ramón Gayoso in September 1992. The following year (1993), she was hired by Antena 3 to co-host the program El Gran Juego de la Oca, whose enormous success in the many countries where it was broadcast brought her fame and recognition.

In 1995, she moved to Argentina for two and a half years. In this country, she shot a film and collaborated on several television programs.

On her return to Spain, she worked for Telecinco in the space Emisión imposible, and a year later she signed on with the regional channel Telemadrid, where she hosted, along with journalist Victor Sandoval, the social news program Mamma mía, which remained on screen until June 2004. She then worked again for Antena 3, in programs such as A la carta and El Supershow. She returned to the Madrid regional channel in 2006 to co-host the contest Metro a Metro (2006-2008) and the hidden camera show Bromas aparte (2006-2009).

In the 2000s, specifically since 2003, she combined her appearances on Telemadrid and Antena 3 with the presentation of the contest Memoria de Elefante on Castilla-La Mancha Televisión and continued on both regional channels for five years.

In 2009, she returned to national television, specifically to Telecinco, aking over the reins of the program Vuélveme loca with Celia Montalbán and later with Tania Llasera after Celia's departure. She remained at the helm of the program for two years, until 28 December 2011, when she was replaced by Jaime Bores.

In 2017, she debuted on laSexta's weekend mornings with her husband, Luis Canut, in the program Los Hygge.

Patricia specialized in orthomolecular nutrition, nutrigenetics, and nutrigenomics at the University of Barcelona, and she has four books on the market that reflect her extensive knowledge in these areas, as well as lectures on nutrition and healthy eating.

== Filmography ==
=== Movies ===
Movies
| Year | Title | Character | Role |
|---|---|---|---|
| 1995 | Dile a Laura que la quiero | Elena | Secondary role |
| 1997 | Al límite | Víctima | Minor role |
| 1997 | Matusalem II: le dernier des Beauchesne | Esperenza del Plata y Oro | Secondary role |
| 2005 | Más allá de la memoria | Enfermera | Minor role |

=== Television series ===
Television series
| Year | Title | Character | Duration |
|---|---|---|---|
| 1997 - 1999 | La casa de los líos | Rosi | 2 episodes |
| 2002 | Living Lavapies | Michelle | 1 episode |
| 2005 | 7 vidas | Tamara | 1 episode |
| 2007 | C.L.A. No somos ángeles | Patricia | 1 episode |

=== Television programs ===
Television programs
| Year | Title | Channel | Role |
|---|---|---|---|
| 1991 - 1992 | Coa miña xente | TVG | Hostess |
| 1992 - 1993 | Luar | TVG | Co-host |
| 1993 - 1994 | El Gran Juego de la Oca | Antena 3 | Host |
| 1994 | Nos vamos de vacaciones | Antena 3 | Contributor |
| 1998 | Mar a mar | TVG | Host |
| 2000 | Emisión Imposible | Telecinco | Reporter |
| 2001 - 2004 | Mamma mía | Telemadrid | Host |
| 2002 - 2003 | Xanadú | Telemadrid | Host |
| 2003 | Megaéxito | TVG | Host |
| 2003 - 2008 | Memoria de Elefante | Castilla-La Mancha Televisión | Host |
| 2004 | A la carta | Antena 3 | Co-host |
| 2004 | El Supershow | Antena 3 | Host |
| 2006 - 2008 | Metro a Metro | Telemadrid | Host |
| 2006 - 2009 | Bromas aparte | Telemadrid | Co-host |
| 2009 - 2011 | Vuélveme loca | Telecinco La Siete | Host |
| 2016 | Yo si que como | FOX Life | Host |
| 2017 - 2018 | Los Hygge, una pareja muy natural | La Sexta | Host |
| 2022 | Mundo Brasero | Antena 3 | Contributor |

== Bibliography ==
- Yo sí que como (2013)
- Yo sí que cocino (2015)
- Yo sí que me cuido (2016)
