= El gran juego de la oca =

Spanish television game show

El gran juego de la oca (The Great Game of the Goose) is a game show produced in Madrid, Spain, from 1993 through 1995, and again in 1998 as El nuevo juego de la oca (The New Game of the Goose). It was a weekly show airing in a block of several hours on the Spanish channel Antena 3, and later Telecinco. The show was created by television producer Jocelyn Hattab, and first premiered in Italy as Il grande gioco dell'oca.

In January 2021, a remake produced by Endemol Shine Boomdog in Mexico has been announced, and an Argentinian version is to premiere on El Trece.

== Hosts ==
Each season had a different trio of presenters – a lead male host and two female assistants – that shared hosting duties:

- Emilio Aragón, Lydia Bosch, and Patricia Pérez (1993–94)
- Pepe Navarro, Eugenia Santana, and Ivonne Reyes (1994–95)
- Andrés Caparrós, Elsa Anka, and Paloma Marín (1998, El nuevo juego de la oca)

In all seasons, at least one celebrity was invited as a guest host per episode, and was brought out several times to explain and/or participate in some of the challenges.

== Premise and gameplay ==
Four adult contestants, two men and two women, played a giant board game based on the centuries-old children's game, Juego de la oca (Game of the Goose). A 63-space game board was set up around the perimeter of a large arena, with the object being to reach space 63 by exact count. Contestants earned money with each roll of the dice, which they then used to bet on how well they could perform pruebas, or Hollywood-type challenges and stunts that tested the contestants' minds, bodies, and nerves. The majority of these challenges took place either on a main stage (one of two in the second season), a giant cage, a circular swimming pool in the middle of the set, or on one of several large playing floors for the more elaborate challenges.

A contestant began the game with ₧100,000 (€601, then-equivalent to roughly US$800). On a turn, he or she "rolled" the electronic "dice", and advanced the number of spaces rolled. Each space traveled via dice roll was worth ₧10,000. After landing on the designated space, the contestant was shown a prueba that he had to perform. After the host explained how to accomplish the task, the contestant wagered some or all of his money, depending on how confident he/she was that he/she could succeed. Successfully completing the stunt added the player's wager to his or her score, while a failed stunt deducted the wager. Not attempting a prueba, or refusing to go through a "punishment" sequence (such as the haircut space) where required, resulted in a contestant losing all of his or her money accumulated to that point; however, this rarely happened.

=== Spaces ===
Special spaces were distributed along the path, with the game generally getting more "dangerous" the further along a contestant moved. The special spaces included:

- Ocas (Geese): Landing on an Oca resulted in that player being escorted to the next Oca and rolling again (the contestant won no money for the spaces skipped in this way). Ocas were found at spaces 5 (first season only), 9, 18, 27, 36, 45, and 54. (If a contestant landed on space #54, he advanced to space #63 and automatically won the game.)

Traditionally, before a contestant took his second roll, he and the host recited a rhyme from the board game: De oca a oca... tiro porque me toca (From Goose to Goose, I roll because it's my turn.)

- Dados (Dice) (#7, Season 1): Dados was a special shortcut that advanced the contestant to space number 20, at which point he rolled again. As with the Oca spaces, no additional money was awarded for the spaces skipped over. Before the second roll, another poem was recited: De dado a dado... tiro porque me ha tocado. (From Die to Die, I roll because it's my turn.)
- Mud Wrestling (#8 in Season 1, 31 in Season 2, 22 in Season 3): This space was next to a mud pit; landing here resulted in the contestant having to perform a stunt in the mud while being hindered by a female mud wrestler (two in the third season).
- Restaurante chino (Chinese Restaurant – #19, Season 2): Any contestant who landed here had to take a seat at the mock Chinese restaurant. The "waiter" brought out a disgusting food (such as a whole rat cooked in sweet and sour sauce), and the contestant had to at least sample the food to avoid losing all his money.
- Watermelons (#31 in Season 1, 33 in Season 3): If a contestant landed here, his challenge was to use a machete to chop watermelons that rolled randomly out of a large tube.
- Pintacuerpos (Body painting – No. 34 in Season 1, 40 in Season 3): Landing here resulted in the contestant having to spin a wheel to determine which part of his or her body got the show's goose head logo painted on it. The spaces on the wheel were arm, back, chest, stomach, and bottom. The body paint artist would cut away any part of the contestant's clothing that was in the way.
- Snake Den (#47 in Season 1, 53 in Season 2, 52 in Season 3): If someone landed here, he or she had to enter an acrylic glass pit filled with sand and boa constrictors. The door was locked behind the contestant, and he or she had a certain amount of time to find the key to the other side and get out. In the first season, any contestant landing here also advanced to No. 50 (the exit); no extra spaces were awarded in subsequent seasons.
- Castle Wall (#51 in Seasons 1 and 2, 30 in Season 3): The contestant was required to scale the adjacent castle wall in some manner, which changed weekly, and kiss the prince or princess (depending on the contestant's gender) waiting at the top.
- Haircut (#52 in Season 1, 48 in Season 2, not a fixed space in Season 3): The contestant was seated in a barber's chair at this space and had to answer three questions (the last of which was always impossible to answer in the five seconds allotted.) Getting any question wrong resulted in the player receiving a severe haircut by a deranged barber. Men were usually shaven bald, while women had their hair cut very short.
- Cage Match (#57 in Season 1, 43 in Season 2, 30 in Season 3): If a contestant landed on the space at the entrance of the large cage, he or she had to enter it and battle the gladiator-type fighters inside on bungee cords. The challenge was usually to retrieve a key attached to the backside of the female gladiator, who was allowed to do anything to hinder the contestant. In all three seasons, the host stated very clearly that there were no rules as far as what the gladiator (and presumably the contestant) could do. Other challenges took place inside the cage that did not require the contestant to land there or involve the gladiators.
- Depilación (Waxing) (#57 in Season 2, not a fixed space in Season 1): This space had a hospital bed and a woman dressed as a nurse standing next to it. Any male contestant who landed here was asked five questions, with each incorrect answer resulting in part of his leg hair being waxed off; three correct answers won the challenge.
- La muerte (Death) (#58, Season 1): This space was marked by a skull and crossbones; landing here resulted in the contestant being sent back to start (however, he kept his money). This space was featured on the original board game. This was replaced by la catapulta in the second season; any contestant who landed on No. 55 was usually, but not always, placed on a large catapult and "launched" via bungee cord back to start.
- Ruleta cruel (Cruel Roulette – No. 61, all versions): If a player landed here, he had to spin the adjacent wheel and lost whatever percentage of money it landed on. In the second and third seasons, the player was strapped to a large version of the wheel and spun around rapidly. The pointer was above his head, and again the contestant lost the percentage of money on which it stopped.

=== Characters and personalities ===
Regular characters and/or personalities on the show included:

- Oquettes – an eight-member dance team that "sang" the theme song, escorted contestants to certain spaces, and participated in some of the challenges
- Chicos/chicas oca – random male and female cast members that participated in the workings of some of the challenges
- Guest hosts – every week, a celebrity from Spain came on the show as a guest host
- Romy – the mudwrestler in Season 1
- Marvel – the mudwrestler in Season 2
- Calzoncillo Man ("Underwear Man") – an anti-superhero dressed in pink pajamas who hindered the contestants' progress on several episodes
- Maxtor – a muscular African male dressed as a warrior, who competed against contestants in later episodes
- Promotional Characters – Super Mario (representing Nintendo), a cow (representing milk), and elves (representing Boskys cereal) appeared to promote their products; usually, the game involved their product as well
- Flequi (pronounced "FLEH-kee") – the barber during the first season; he became quite popular with the show's fans and got more involved in other parts of the show (especially final stunts) as the season progressed
- Rizotín – the barber during the second season; he gave wilder haircuts to men than did Flequi and had a much more flamboyant personality (vaguely resembling Salvador Dalí).
- Danny – the offstage judge who made decisions on close calls during Season 1
- Fernando, el mimoso pringoso (the "Greasy Lover") – a disgusting, fat, smelly man who ate spaghetti like a two-year-old; a Q&A game was played in which correct answers resulted in him kissing the female host, and incorrect answers resulted in him kissing the contestant
- La fea besucona ("the ugly kissing lady") – an ugly hag who played a kissing game similar to Fernando's, this time involving a male contestant and Emilio
- Sound guys – played the background music and inserted sound effects for comic relief.
- Los monstruos – goofy monsters who wore shredded Sunday clothes
- Alberto Murroni – a world-famous knife thrower who appeared with his assistant Vesna Peracino on all episodes of the show including the Italian version. After a brief demonstration, the contestant was usually asked to guess the outcome of another, or successfully perform a stunt with Murroni.
- El mago Mártin (Martin the Magician) – performed magic tricks during the second season
- El invitado ("the Undertaker") – escorted a contestant off the stage after landing on Death
- Las ocas – live geese that were allowed to roam freely around the stage on all versions

=== Challenges – las pruebas ===
- Beso o Tortazo (Kiss or Slap): A male contestant landing here was presented with a (usually sexy) conversation by one of the Oquettes, which was left incomplete. He had to guess whether the outcome would be a kiss (beso) or a slap (tortazo), indicated for the viewing audience on the back of each Oquette's jacket. In order to win, the contestant had to guess at least five out of the eight Oquettes' responses correctly. Regardless, right or wrong, the contestant received the kiss or slap anyway. If the contestant was female, the Oquettes would kiss or slap the host (or occasionally in later seasons, the guest host); however, on the final episode of the first season, the in-house judge was brought out and he received the kisses and slaps.

=== Final mission – la reoca ===
A contestant who reached space 63 won the game and kept all the money he had accumulated. In the first season, he then was given until the taping of the next show (one week) to perform a reoca, an additional mission attempted outside the studio, in order to win a car. The whole thing was taped and watched at the beginning of the next episode; the participating player was then informed whether or not he won the automobile.

== Tournament ==
After 32 standard games had been played (excluding celebrity episodes), a lottery was held to determine who would be invited back to participate in the Tournament of Champions. The names of all winning male contestants were placed into one hopper, while the names of the winning female contestants were placed into another. Eight names were drawn from each, and these were divided up into four semifinal games with two men and two women each. The four semifinal winners competed in a final episode to determine the Grand Champion for that season.

In the second season, all finalists began the game with ₧250,000 (€1,502, then-equivalent to approximately $2,000) instead of 100,000.

== Broadcast ==
The entire first season of this show was aired in the United States on Telemundo and Mexico on TV Azteca in the 1994–1995 television year, exactly one year after airing in Spain. Episodes from the second and third seasons were never shown in the US.

A New Year's Eve special featured four celebrities including Mr. T. The special was not aired in the US.

== International versions ==
Country/Region	Local title	Presenters	Channel	Broadcast
Argentina	El gran juego de la oca	Dani La Chepi and Joaquín 'Pollo' Álvarez	eltrece	2022
Chile	El gran juego de la oca	Christian Gordon (voice-over)	Canal 13	1994–1995
Italy	Il grande gioco dell'oca	Gigi Sabani, Jo Squillo and Simona Tagli	Rai Due	1993
Italy	Il grande gioco dell'oca	Gigi Sabani, Paola Saluzzi and Alessia Marcuzzi	Rai Due	1994
Mexico	El gran juego de la oca	Andrés Caparrós, Elsa Anka and Paloma Marín	TV Azteca	1994–1995
Portugal	O Jogo do Ganso	?	TVI	1994–1998
Spain	El gran juego de la oca	Emilio Aragón, Lydia Bosch and Patricia Pérez	Antena 3	1993–1994
Spain	El gran juego de la oca	Pepe Navarro, Eugenia Santana and Ivonne Reyes	Antena 3	1995
Spain	El nuevo juego de la oca	Andrés Caparrós, Elsa Anka and Paloma Marín	Telecinco	1998
Uruguay	El gran juego de la oca	Rafa Villanueva and Sofía Romano	Teledoce	2022
