= 2024 in Spanish television =

This is a list of Spanish television related events from 2024.

== Events ==
- 14 February – All digital terrestrial television stations cease to air in standard definition, switching to or keeping their HDTV frequencies.
- 11 March – Fox is rebranded as Star Channel.
- 26 March – José Pablo López is removed as RTVE director of General Content and Elena Sánchez Caballero is removed as acting Chair of RTVE amid infighting within the corporation's governing board.
- 27 March – Concepción Cascajosa is named new acting Chair of RTVE.
- 15 May – Production company Fabricantes Studio launches streaming channel Canal Quickie.
- 21 May – HBO Max is rebranded as Max.
- 22 May – Mediaset España announces the appointment of Cristina Garmendia as the new company president, replacing Borja Prado.
- 2 December – José Pablo López takes office as the new chair of RTVE.

== Debuts ==
Title	Channel / platform	Debut date	Performers / host	Genre	Ref.
Generación TOP	LaSexta	3 January	Ana Pastor	Quiz show	
La mejor generación	Telecinco	8 January	Lara Álvarez	Talent show	
En guardia: Mujeres contra el crimen	Cuatro	10 January		Documentary	
Serrines, madera de actor	Amazon Prime Video	12 January	Antonio Resines	Comedy	
The Law of the Sea	À Punt	15 January	Luis Tosar, Blanca Portillo	Drama	
Galgos	Movistar Plus+	18 January	Adriana Ozores, Luis Bermejo	Drama	
Cristóbal Balenciaga	Disney+	19 January	Alberto San Juan	Biographical	
Zorro	Amazon Prime Video	25 January	Miguel Bernardeau, Renata Notni	Drama	
Una vida menos en Canarias	Atresplayer	28 January	Ginés García Millán, Natalia Verbeke	Police procedural	
Detective Touré	EITB PRIMERAN, La 1	1 February	Malcolm Treviño-Sitté	Police procedural	
Drag Race España All Stars	Atresplayer	4 February	Supremme de Luxe	Talent show	
Sexo, famosos y muñecos de trapo	Flooxer, Atresplayer	11 February	Valeria Ros	Comedy	
Little Nicholas: Life of a Scoundrel	Netflix	15 February		Documentary	
Love Cost	TV3	15 February	Núria Marín	Dating show	
Sueños de libertad	Antena 3	25 February	Natalia Sánchez, Alain Hernández	Melodrama	
Red Queen	Amazon Prime Video	29 February	Vicky Luengo, Hovik Keuchkerian	Thriller	
See You in Another Life	Disney+	6 March	Roberto Gutiérrez, Quim Ávila	Biographical	
Un nuevo amanecer	Atresplayer	10 March	Yolanda Ramos	Comedy-drama	
Baila como puedas	La 1	11 March	Anne Igartiburu	Talent show	
Iron Reign	Netflix	15 March	Eduard Fernández	Crime drama	
Macarena	Movistar Plus+	18 March		Documentary	
La pasión turca	Atresplayer	24 March	Maggie Civantos, İlker Kaleli	Drama	
Mental Masters	Telecinco	25 March	Carlos Sobera	Game show	
Muertos S.L.	Movistar Plus+	4 April	Carlos Areces, Diego Martín	Comedy	
Red Flags	Atresplayer	7 April	Mar Isem, Diego Rey	Drama	
Tiempo al tiempo	Cuatro	8 April	Mario Picazo	Magazine	
El caso Sancho	HBO Max	9 April		Documentary	
Ovejas Eléctricas	La 2	9 April	Berto Romero	Culture	
Operación Barrio Inglés	La 1	10 April	Aria Bedmar, Peter Vives	Spy thriller	
Bellas artes	Movistar Plus+	11 April	Óscar Martínez, Ángela Molina	Comedy	
En primicia	La 2	11 April	Lara Siscar	Documentary	
Geópolis	RTVE Play, La 2	14 April	Silvia Intxaurrondo	News	
El 1%	Antena 3	17 April	Arturo Valls	Game show	
Otro enfoque	Cuatro	17 April	Jon Sistiaga	News	
Perverso	Amazon Prime Video	19 April	Iván Massagué, Kira Miró	Thriller	
The Asunta Case	Netflix	26 April	Candela Peña, Tristán Ulloa	Crime drama	
Beguinas	Atresplayer	28 April	Amaia Aberasturi, Yon González	Drama	
Marbella	Movistar Plus+	2 May	Hugo Silva, Ana Isabelle	Crime drama	
Cooking Up Murder: Uncovering the Story of César Román	Netflix	10 May		Documentary	
Past Lies	Disney+	10 May	Elena Anaya, Belén Cuesta	Thriller	
Ni que fuéramos	Canal Quickie, Ten	15 May	Belén Esteban, Chelo García-Cortés	Magazine	
El consultorio de Berto	Movistar Plus+	20 May	Berto Romero	Comedy	
Naked Attraction	Max	21 May	Marta Flich	Reality show	
El Marqués	Telecinco	22 May	José Pastor, Víctor Clavijo	Crime drama	
Atasco	Amazon Prime Video	24 May	María León, Antonio Resines	Comedy	
The Man Without a Heart	Max	31 May		Crime documentary	
Raising Voices	Netflix	31 May	Nicole Wallace, Clara Galle	Drama	
Eva & Nicole	Atresplayer	2 June	Belén Rueda, Hiba Abouk	Drama	
Segunda muerte	Movistar Plus+	6 June	Karra Elejalde, Georgina Amorós	Drama	
Desde el mañana	Disney+	12 June	Marta Hazas, Álex González	Science fiction	
Invictus. ¿Te atreves?	La 1	17 June	Patricia Conde	Game show	
Lina. La mujer espectacular	Movistar Plus+	17 June		Documentary	
Gangs of Galicia	Netflix	21 June	Clara Lago, Tamar Novas	Thriller, Drama, Crime	
Lucrecia: Un crimen de odio	Disney+	27 June		Documentary	
Los Iglesias. Hermanos a la obra	La 1	9 July	Chabeli Iglesias, Julio Iglesias Jr.	Reality show	
El diario de Jorge	Telecinco	28 July	Jorge Javier Vázquez	Talk show	
Babylon Show	Telecinco	26 August	Carlos Latre	Talk show	
Breathless	Netflix	30 August	Najwa Nimri, Aitana Sánchez-Gijón, Blanca Suárez	Drama	
López y Leal contra el canal	Antena 3	4 September	Eva González, Iñaki López, Roberto Leal	Game show	
La Revuelta	La 1	9 September	David Broncano	Comedy-talk show	
En fin	Amazon Prime Video	13 September	José Manuel Poga, Malena Alterio, Irene Pérez	Comedy	
El gran premio de la cocina	La 1	16 September	Lydia Bosch, Germán González	Cooking competition	
Valle salvaje	La 1	18 September	Rocío Suárez de Puga, Marco Pernas	Period drama	
Las abogadas	La 1	25 September	Paula Usero, Irene Escolar	Drama	
La bien cantá	La 1	1 October	Rocío Muñoz	Talent show	
Conspiranoicos	LaSexta	3 October	Joaquín Castellón	News	
Regreso a Las Sabinas	Disney+	11 October	Andrés Velencoso, Celia Freijeiro	Melodrama	
Querer	Movistar Plus+	17 October	Nagore Aranburu, Pedro Casablanc	Legal drama	
Medina: El estafador de famosos	Amazon Prime Video	18 October	Jorge Ponce	Documentary	
¿A qué estás esperando?	Atresplayer	20 October	Adriana Torrebejano, Rubén Cortada	Sex comedy	
Dieciocho	RTVE Play	23 October	Alícia Falcó, Maël Rouin-Berrandou	Teen drama	
Demos: El gran sondeo	Telecinco	23 October	Risto Mejide	Talk show	
The Last Night at Tremore Beach	Netflix	25 October	Javier Rey, Ana Polvorosa	Psychological thriller	
I, Addict	Disney+	30 October	Oriol Pla	Drama	
Bank Under Siege	Netflix	8 November	Miguel Herrán, María Pedraza	Thriller	
Celeste	Movistar Plus+	14 November	Carmen Machi, Andrea Bayardo	Comedy-thriller	
Mamen Mayo	SkyShowtime	18 November	Silvia Abril, Clara Sans	Comedy	
Al cielo con ella	RTVE Play	24 November	Henar Álvarez	Comedy-talk show	
The New Years	Movistar Plus+	28 November	Iria del Río, Francesco Carril	Drama	
Was I a Sex Object?	Max	12 December		Documentary	
1992	Netflix	13 December	Marian Álvarez, Fernando Valdivielso	Thriller	
Invisible	Disney+	13 December	Eric Seijo, Aura Garrido	Teen drama	
Santuario	Atresplayer	22 December	Aura Garrido, Lucía Guerrero	Science fiction	

== Ending this year ==
- La 1
  - 4 estrellas (2023–2024)
  - Ahora o nunca (2023–2024)
  - HIT (2020–2024)
  - Lazos de sangre (2018-2024)
- La 2
  - El cazador de cerebros (2015-2024)
  - La matemática del espejo (2021-2024)
  - Los pilares del tiempo (2022-2024)
  - Mi cole es rural (2023-2024)
- Antena 3
  - Amar es para siempre (2013–2024)
- Cuatro
  - ¡Boom! (2014–2024)
  - Cuatro al día (2019–2024)
  - En busca del Nirvana (2023–2024)
- Telecinco
  - El rival más débil (2002–2024)
  - ¡Allá tú! (2004–2024)
  - Adivina qué hago (2019–2024)
  - Wrong Side of the Tracks (2022–2024)
- Amazon Prime Video
  - Operación Marea Negra (2022–2024)
- Netflix
  - Elite (2018–2024)
  - Fame After Fame (2023–2024)
- Movistar Plus+
  - La Resistencia (2018–2024)
  - Rapa (2022–2024)
  - Showriano (2023–2024)

== Returning this year ==
Show	Previous network	Last aired	New network	Type of return	Returning
La isla de las tentaciones	Telecinco	2023	Telecinco	New season	9 January
Bake Off: Famosos al horno	Amazon Prime Video	2021	La 1	Revival	11 January
Gran Hermano Dúo	Telecinco	2019	Telecinco	New season	11 January
El desafío	Antena 3	2023	Antena 3	New season	12 January
Bailando con las estrellas	La 1	2018	Telecinco	Revival	13 January
Cifras y letras	FORTA	2013	La 2	Revival	15 January
Lo de Évole	LaSexta	2023	LaSexta	New season	21 January
Atrapa un millón	Antena 3	2023	Antena 3	New season	27 January
Noticias Cuatro	Cuatro	2019	Cuatro	Revival	29 January
Fame After Fame	Netflix	2023	Netflix	New episodes	1 February
Maestros de la costura	La 1	2022	La 1	New season	6 February
Alpha Males	Netflix	2022	Netflix	New season	9 February
Operación Marea Negra	Amazon Prime Video	2022	Amazon Prime Video	New season	9 February
El Inmortal. Gangs of Madrid	Movistar Plus+	2022	Movistar Plus+	New season	22 February
Martínez y Hermanos	Movistar Plus+	2023	Cuatro	New season	4 March
Callejeros	Cuatro	2014	Cuatro	Revival	6 March
Supervivientes	Telecinco	2023	Telecinco	New season	7 March
¿Quién quiere ser millonario?	Antena 3	2022	LaSexta	New season	2 April
Tu cara me suena	Antena 3	2023	Antena 3	New season	12 April
La Voz Kids	Antena 3	2023	Antena 3	New season	13 April
Factor X	Telecinco	2018	Telecinco	New season	17 April
Adivina qué hago	Cuatro	2020	Telecinco	Revival	20 April
El Grand Prix del verano	La 1	2023	La 1	New season	8 July
HIT	La 1	2021	La 1	New season	16 July
Elite	Netflix	2023	Netflix	New season	26 July
Lo sabe, no lo sabe	Cuatro	2013	Cuatro	Revival	25 August
Wrong Side of the Tracks	Telecinco	2023	Telecinco	New season	2 September
Pesadilla en la cocina	LaSexta	2023	LaSexta	New season	3 September
El rival más débil	La 2	2004	Telecinco	Revival	4 September
Gran Hermano	Telecinco	2017	Telecinco	New season	5 September
¡Boom!	Antena 3	2023	Cuatro	Revival	9 September
¿Quién quiere casarse con mi hijo?	Cuatro	2017	Cuatro	New season	9 September
Rapa	Movistar Plus+	2023	Movistar Plus+	New season	12 September
59 segundos	La 1	2012	La 1	Revival	19 September
Mask Singer: Adivina quién canta	Antena 3	2023	Antena 3	New season	16 October
Pekín Express	LaSexta	2016	Max	Revival	20 October

== Changes of network affiliation ==
Show	Moved From	Moved To
Adivina qué hago esta noche / Adivina qué hago (2019–2024)	Cuatro	Telecinco
Bailando con las estrellas (2018–)	La 1	Telecinco
¡Boom! (2014–2024)	Antena 3	Cuatro
Celebrity Bake Off España / Bake Off: Famosos al horno (2021–)	Amazon Prime Video	La 1
Cifras y letras (1991–)	FORTA	La 2
El conquistador del fin del mundo (2005–)	La 1	ETB 2
Martínez y Hermanos (2022–)	Movistar Plus+	Cuatro
Pekín Express (2008–)	LaSexta	Max
¿Quién quiere ser millonario? (1999–)	Antena 3	LaSexta
El rival más débil (2002–2024)	La 2	Telecinco

== Deaths ==
- 3 January – Arévalo, comedian, 76.
- 13 January – Juli Mira, actor, 74.
- 16 January – José Lifante, actor, 80.
- 27 January – Eugenio Nasarre, former Chair of RTVE, 77.
- 17 February – Bartolomé Beltrán, doctor and television presenter, 74.
- 18 February – Fernando Delgado, journalist, 77.
- 19 February – Alejandro Echevarría, former chairman of Mediaset España, 81.
- 13 March – Montse Miralles, voice actress, 67.
- 18 March – Rosalía Dans, actress and painter, 68.
- 23 March – Silvia Tortosa, actress and presenter, 77.
- 28 March – Anna Pérez Pagès, culture journalist and presenter, 49.
- 9 April – Jaime de Armiñán, director and screenwriter, 97.
- 23 April – Itxaso Mardones, journalist, 45.
- 1 May – Victoria Prego, journalist, 75.
- 22 May – Miguel Ángel Díaz, director and screenwriter, 77.
- 30 May – Ricardo Arques, journalist, 64.
- 12 June – Fermí Reixach, actor, 77.
- 15 June – Constantino Mediavilla, journalist, 63.
- 28 June – Txema Blasco, actor, 82.
- 7 July – Enric Sopena, journalist, 78.
- 23 July – Teresa Gimpera, actress and model, 87.
- 24 July – Elsa Llorente, journalist, 43.
- 14 August – Carlos Ferrando, journalist, 76.
- 17 September – Jimmy Giménez-Arnau, journalist and pundit, 81.
- 28 September – Maite Brik, actress, 79.
- 30 September – Paula Martel, actress, 88.
- 9 October – Elisa Montés, actress, 89.
- 12 October – Núria Gispert, journalist and writer, 66.
- 13 October – Mayra Gómez Kemp, presenter, singer and actress, 76.
- 16 October – Agustí Forné López, sports journalist, 62.
- 15 November – Lola Cordón, actress, 88.
- 5 December – José de la Torre, actor, 37.
- 17 December – Marisa Paredes, actress, 78.

== See also ==
- 2024 in Spain
