= Francesc Gras Salas =

Spanish ophthalmologist and writer (1921–2022)

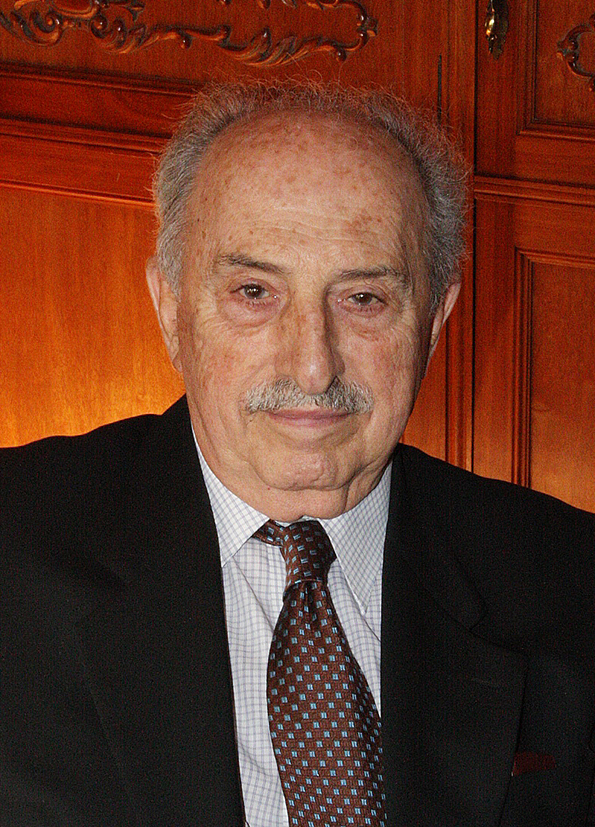
- Born: 30 March 1921; Reus, Spain
- Died: 14 August 2022 (aged 101)
- Awards: El més amic de Reus

Francesc Gras Salas (30 March 1921 – 14 August 2022) was a Spanish ophthalmologist and writer who contributed to the dissemination of Reus memory and history.

== Medical activity ==
A member of a line of ophthalmologists from Reus, started by his grandfather Francesc Gras Fortuny, he studied medicine in Barcelona and doctoral studies in Madrid. He practiced ophthalmology at 35 Llovera Street in Reus between 1948 and 1999. He was also a doctor at the Saint John Hospital in Reus for 20 years.

In February 2012, he donated to the Reus Hospital the medical utensils and equipment of his consultation, some of historical value. These utensils and devices can be seen exposed in a space of plant −1 of this hospital. He also donated about thirty volumes of the publication La Medecina Contemporánea. Revista Médica de Reus (Reus publication of the late nineteenth century founded by his grandfather), at the Museum of the History of Medicine of Catalonia, in Terrassa.

== Cultural and associative activity ==
He wrote opinion articles in the Diario Español and Semanario Reus under the pseudonym Suero Vital. He also collaborated on medical publications. Later, he also wrote articles in the Diari de Tarragona and in the Guia de Reus.

Gras Salas published six books about Reus:

- Fets i Gent de Reus. (1997) – ('Facts and People of Reus')
- Gent, racons i olors de Reus. (2000) ('People, Corners and Smells of Reus')
- De Llevant cap a Ponent. Escrits. (2006) ('From East to West. Writings.')
- Records de Reus. Quan es duien espardenyes, sales de ball reusenques, de la Guerra Civil i d’altres Records. (2009) ('Memories of Reus. When Wearing Espadrilles, Reus Ballrooms, the Civil War and Other Memorabilia.')
- Parlem de Reus. De la seva gent i d'esdeveniments importants. Recull d'articles publicats. (2014) ('Let's Talk About Reus. Of Its People and Important Events. Collection of Published Articles.')
- Estimar i recordar la nostra ciutat. Recull de 43 articles publicats a la revista Lo Nunci del Centre d'Amics de Reus. (2019) ('Love and Remember Our City. Collection of 43 Articles Published in the Magazine Lo Nunci of the Center of Reus Friends.')

Gras Salas was the driving force behind the recovery of the Reus Concerts Association in 1952, of which he was a member of the board between the 1950s and 1970s. In February 1956, he took part in the organization of the tribute to the Reus dancer Rosita Mauri. In 2009 he promoted the realization of a Chamber Cycle in memory of the Reus pianist Pau Martí Roca.

Gras Salas was a member of the Congregation of the Purest Blood of Reus between 1954 and 1964, an entity with which he promoted the restoration of the presbytery of the Church of the Purest Blood of Reus after its destruction during the civil war. He was the announcer of Holy Week in Reus in 2007.

Gras Salas was the promoter of the Guardadors de la Tronada organization, which oversees the maintenance of the traditional Tronada (a fireworks show) of the Summer Festival of Reus.

During the 1960s, he was vice-president of the Reus-Costa Daurada Aero-club.

In 2003, he was the driving force behind the recovery of the figure of the Reus architect Domènec Sugrañes i Gras, who had been a disciple of Antoni Gaudí, during the 125th anniversary of his birth celebrated that year. Among other acts, the Sol i Mar building in Salou was recovered, a work of the architect and which had some sgraffito that was in poor condition, a plaque was placed in his birthplace in Carrer de les Galanes and a street was dedicated to him.

In 2009, he made the necessary arrangements to rediscover the authorship of Lluís Domènech i Montaner of the Margenat Chapel in the Reus cemetery and a plaque was placed there.

In 2012, the Center of Reus Friends awarded him the El més amic de Reus ('Reus Best Friend') award, which distinguishes the people and entities that have carried out an important career and have contributed to the name of Reus.

Gras Salas turned 100 in 2021. He died on 14 August 2022, at the age of 101.
