= Adolfo Suárez (disambiguation) =

Adolfo Suárez (1932–2014) was a Spanish lawyer and politician who was Prime Minister of Spain from 1976 to 1981.

Adolfo Suárez may also refer to:

- Adolfo Suárez Rivera (1927–2008), Mexican Cardinal Priest in the Roman Catholic Church
- Adolfo Suárez Illana (born 1964), Spanish politician, lawyer, author and aficionado-practitioner of bullfighting
- Adolfo Suárez Madrid–Barajas Airport, airport in Madrid, Spain, named after Adolfo Suárez
- Adolfo Suárez Stadium, football stadium in Ávila, Spain, named after Adolfo Suárez
