= Jesús Ángel Rojo Pinilla =

Spanish entrepreneur, lawyer, political analyst and writer (born 1974)

Jesús Ángel Rojo
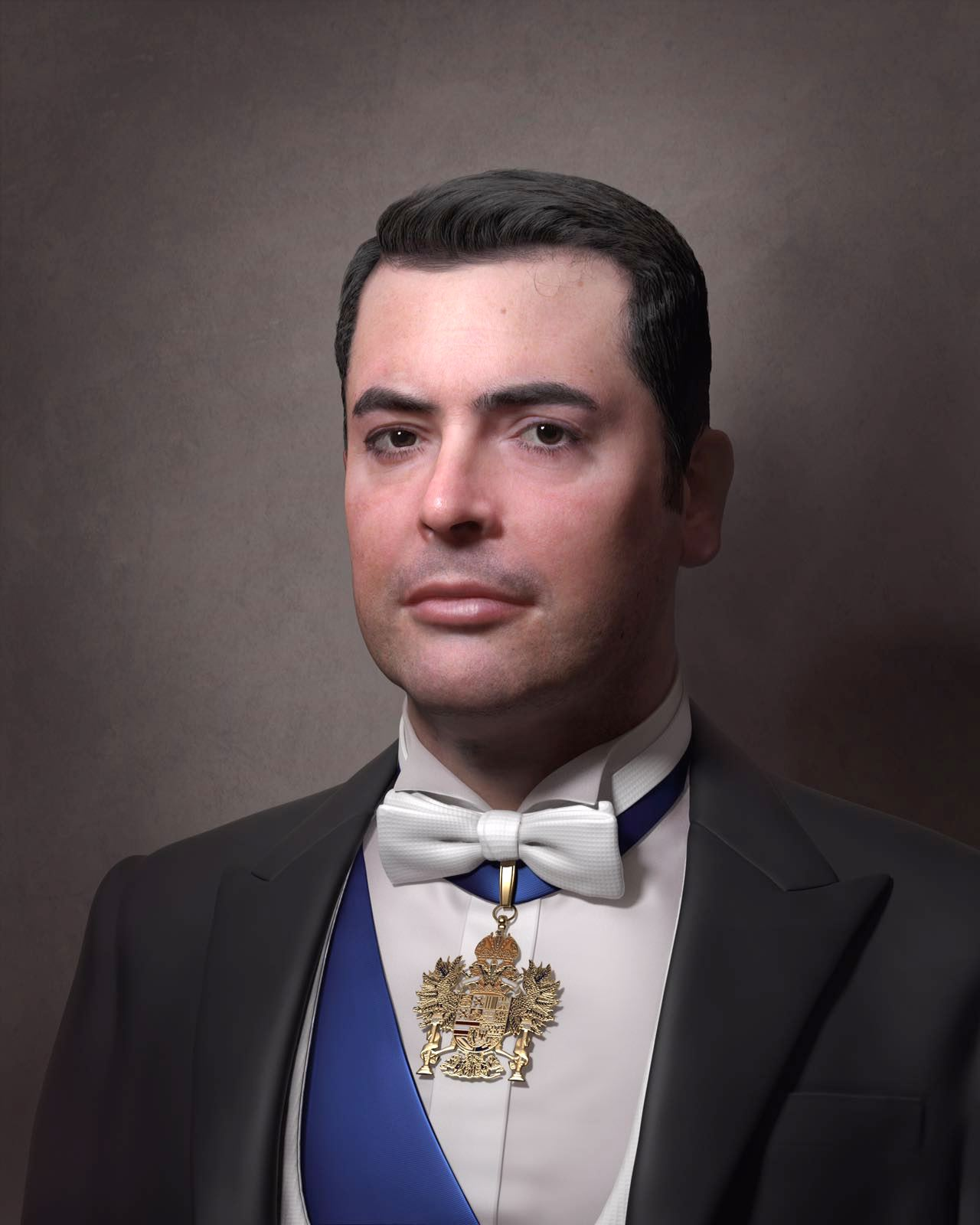
- Rojo Pinilla portrait
- Born: Jesús Ángel Rojo Pinilla; 2 April 1974 (age 52); Madrid, Spain
- Occupations: Historian; Illustrator; Writer
- Writing career
- Genre: History
- Notable works: Cuándo éramos invencibles Cuándo éramos invencibles: Dueños del mundo II

Jesús Ángel Rojo Pinilla (born February 4, 1974, in Madrid, Spain) is a Spanish entrepreneur, lawyer, historian, illustrator, political analyst, writer and journalist.

== Biography ==
In 1999 founded the newspaper The District, which later became the leading newspaper of Madrid local information. His long business career and vocation for journalism drove him to create and lead the Communication Group The District, and an audio-visual company. Pinilla is the director of the radio program "Madrid al Rojo", and candidate for general director of radio TV Madrid (Telemadrid).

His passion for history led him to travel across America and Europe, writing and publishing books on local history. Pinilla is a regular speaker on political and historical issues, and is also a regular contributor to several media communications as an analyst of current policy.

== Publications ==
- District 10 years 2012
- When we were invincible. Best-seller 2015
- The Invincibles of America 2016
- Great traitors to Spain 2017

== Awards and decorations ==
- Military and Hospital Order of St. Lazarus of Jerusalem.
- Academician of the Academy of Diplomacy of the Spain's Kingdom.
- Knight Hispanic Imperial Order of Carlos V.
- Award Communication Group Trough category "Best Communicator"
