= Telemadrid =

Spanish television station

- Country: Spain
- Broadcast area: Community of Madrid
- Headquarters: Ciudad de la Imagen, Pozuelo de Alarcón

Programming
- Picture format: 1080i HDTV

Ownership
- Owner: Radio Televisión Madrid
- Sister channels: LaOtra

History
- Launched: 2 May 1989

Links
- Website: telemadrid.es

Availability

Terrestrial
- DTTV: Channel 7

Telemadrid is a public television station in the Community of Madrid, Spain, the flagship channel of the regional public broadcaster Radio Televisión Madrid (RTVM). It began its broadcast on 2 May 1989.

== History ==
=== First years ===
Telemadrid was created when Joaquín Leguina (PSOE) was the regional president. During its first years, Telemadrid occupied the buildings of the Agencia EFE, where it suffered an attack from the domestic terrorist group GRAPO on 29 May 1993. There were no casualties and the event was covered live on Telemadrid. On 11 March 1997, Telemadrid celebrated the opening of its current location, in the Ciudad de la Imagen, in Pozuelo de Alarcón, Madrid. The building, which was called "special interest" on World Architecture Day in October 1997, holds all of the production centers for the radio-television entity.

=== The digital era ===
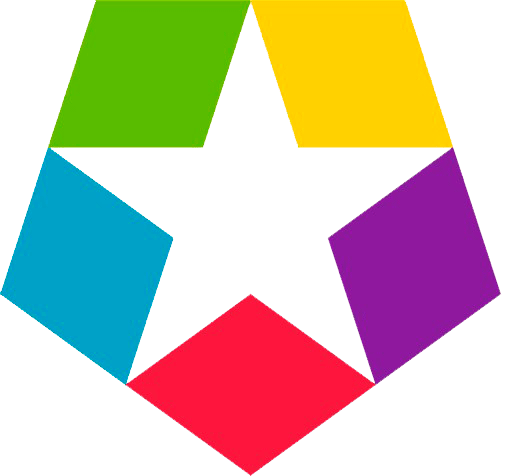
Telemadrid's second logo used from 2001 to 2006

The year 2001 marked a turning point in the history of the Ente Público Empresarial. Telemadrid became the first autonomous television station to utilize Digital terrestrial television (DTT). After a year in tests, on 19 March 2001, the President of Madrid, Alberto Ruiz-Gallardón, inaugurated the broadcast of laOtra, a second autonomous channel exclusively for the DTT system. During its first years it focused on programs of cultural content, suggesting a new model of television with new formats, focused on music, literature, art, and modern sociopolitical movements. The principal programs were Básico, Central de sonidos, Traslucúa, De formas, Otras entrevista, Otra gente, Uno más and La vieja ceremonia, among others.

Nevertheless, this second channel suffered a restructuring in 2006, when it began broadcasting in analog format. Since then, the old content of laOtra began to share airtime with reruns of the primary channel and with newscasts, sports, and children's shows. The analog broadcasting set the national and autonomous administrations at odds on several occasions, since laOtra began its analog broadcast without the permission of Spain's Ministry of Industry, who oversees the allocation of broadcast frequencies, and to whom the station had gone on previous occasions to obtain a license. The broadcast emissions were found to have originated from the facilities of a water company, Canal de Isabel Segunda, politically linked to the Community of Madrid. As of September 2006, Telemadrid' faces a fine of one million euros and the cancellation of laOtra if in fact it is considered just under Spanish law.

Many believe that this sanction hurts the Madrileños when compared with the citizens of other autonomous communities who already have two channels broadcast in analog format, like Euskadi, Andalusia, Valencia, or the Canary Islands, and even three, as in the case of Catalonia. Others by contrast believe that Telemadrid did not follow appropriate procedure and that consequently it should accept the closure of the channel.

=== Politization and decline ===
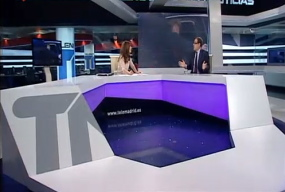
Telenoticias set in 2011

After the arrival of Esperanza Aguirre as the President of Madrid on 17 October 2003, many people accused Aguirre of transforming Telemadrid into the mouthpiece of her party, the ruling party of Madrid, the Partido Popular (PP). When Aguirre came to power, she hired Manuel Soriano to become the general director of Telemadrid. Soriano is a member of the PP and worked as press secretary of Aguirre when she was the Minister of Education and Culture during government of José María Aznar.

From 2003 to 2013, the average audience share plummeted from 17.3% to 3.8%.

The biggest controversy caused by Telemadrid was a documentary about 11 March 2004 Madrid train bombings. In that documentary, it aired the conspiracy theory popular with the Spanish right-wing as a fact, that the Basque separatist group, ETA, was involved in the bombings. It claimed that ETA helped Al Qaeda with the bombings, even though the investigations of the attack have debunked the claims about ETA's involvement. The documentary was also sympathetic of former Prime Minister Aznar and the Partido Popular and their reaction of the attack, and it accused the PSOE of using the attack to win the 2004 Elections.

As with many other autonomous Spanish networks, Telemadrid suffered greatly during the Spanish financial crisis and requested €88m from the regional government to prevent it from becoming bankrupt.

Telemadrid caused another big controversy in April 2007, when it aired a documentary called "Ciudadanos de segunda" (Second-class Citizens), which claimed that the Spanish language and the people who speak it were being persecuted in Catalonia in favor of the Catalan Language. This documentary caused outrage in Catalonia's political spheres. Josep Piqué, the leader of the Catalan branch of the Partido Popular, said that the documentary didn't represent the reality of Catalonia. Meanwhile, the pro-independence Catalan party Esquerra Republicana de Catalunya demanded that the Generalitat de Catalunya respond to Telemadrid judicially, to no avail. Ciutadans de Catalunya, however, argued that the documentary reflected was largely accurate.

Another controversy took place in June 2011, when in an aired report about the 15M movement were included images of riots between the protesters and the police that actually belonged to demonstrations in Greece, being clearly visible Greek flags and policemen.

=== Changes ===
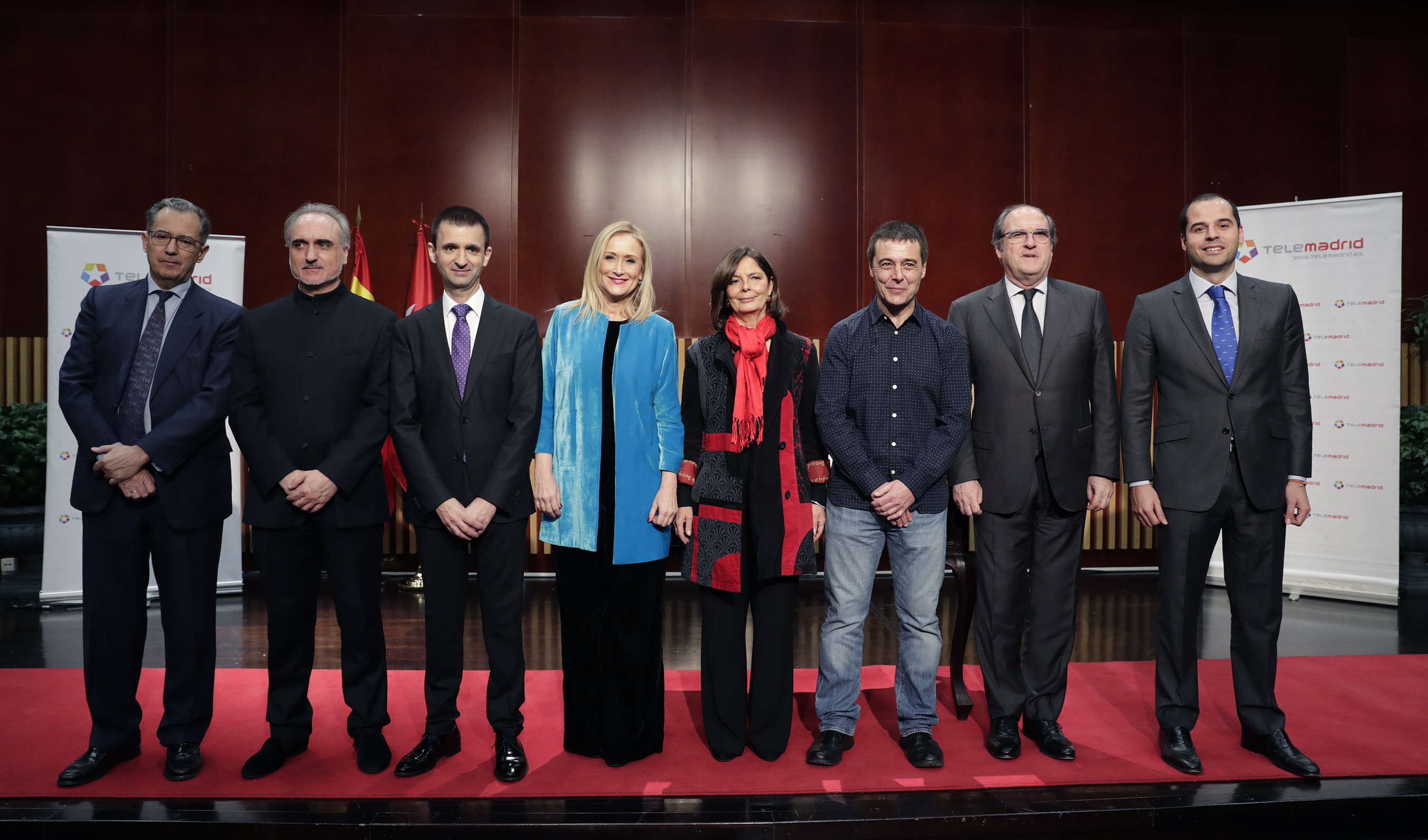
Inauguration of José Pablo López as new Director–General of RTVM in February 2017.

In December 2015, the Assembly of Madrid passed a bill ruling that all the members of the RTVM administration board shall be endorsed by a 2/3 majority of the legislature. After 2017, also during the regional premiership of Cristina Cifuentes, a new managing team, including RTVM Director–General José Pablo López Sánchez and newscast service director Jon Ariztimuño entered the broadcaster.

The new model received support from the populace; with around a 70% of citizens backing it up according to polls, and with the best audience for the newscast service in more than a decade in 2020. While far from its heyday, viewership figures improved after the channel stopped being the "tool of political propaganda" of the regional government. The channel posted three consecutive years of audience growth, ending 2020 with a 6.3% share.

The regional president after 2019, Isabel Díaz Ayuso, warned however that Telemadrid was "no longer an essential public service" and entered together with Vox an all-out war against the broadcaster, trying to change the managing structure and to directly control it by intervening through the regional ministry of Finance. Ayuso publicly berated the network, affirming that she was "the only president of an autonomous region and of the Government of Spain who has a television station that is critical of their". However, the broadcaster achieved a balanced budget in 2020, thwarting protracted attempts of a direct intervention despite the financial stranglehold it was subjected to by the regional government and the stress caused by the COVID-19 pandemic.

== Programming ==
The programming of Telemadrid has always revolved around the lives of madrileños, focusing on information, sports, children's programming, series and movies and politics. Some of their shows have been exported to other autonomous regional television stations, and even to other national television stations like "Buenos días, Madrid" or "Madrid Directo". During its lifetime, it has featured such shows as La banda de Telemadrid, Cyberclub, Top Madrid, Todo Madrid, Gran Vía, Fútbol es fútbol, and En acción. Currently, the lineup of the station is made up of more than eight hours of information in many different formats: Telenoticias, Círculo a primera hora, Alto y claro, Diario de la noche, Sucedió en Madrid, En pleno Madrid, Mi cámara y yo and Telenoticias sin fronteras. In addition, the station, has always broadcast sports (En acción, Madrid se mueve, Fútbol es fútbol and the national league - until 2006) and it has broadcast bullfighting programs and information.

Regarding the production of fiction, Telemadrid is not a channel characterized by extensive original programming. Some examples include the TV movies Condenado a vivir (2001) and Pasión adolescente (2001), the series Colegio Mayor (1994), 2 de mayo, la libertad de una nación (2008) and the joint production with Basque regional broadcaster EiTB of Victim Number 8 (2018).
