= Aurelio Menéndez =

Spanish lawyer and politician

Minister of Education and Science
- In office 7 July 1976 – 4 July 1977
- Monarch: Juan Carlos I
- Prime Minister: Adolfo Suárez
- Preceded by: Carlos Robles Piquer
- Succeeded by: Íñigo Cavero

Personal details
- Born: Aurelio Menéndez Menéndez; 1 May 1927 Gijón (Asturias), Spain
- Died: 3 January 2018 (aged 90) Madrid, Spain
- Party: Union of the Democratic Centre
- Education: University of Oviedo

Aurelio Menéndez Menéndez, first Marquess of Ibias (1 May 1927 – 3 January 2018) was a Spanish lawyer and politician who was the Minister of Education between 1976 and 1977.
