= Carlos Robles Piquer =

Spanish diplomat & politician (1925–2018)

Member of the European Parliament
- In office 1986 – 19 July 1999

Senator
- In office 13 June 1983 – 6 July 1987
- Constituency: Assembly of Madrid

Director General of RTVE
- In office 1981–1982
- Preceded by: Fernando Castedo
- Succeeded by: Eugenio Nasarre

1st Secretary of State for Foreign Affairs
- In office 1979–1981
- Succeeded by: Gabriel Manueco

Minister of Education and Science
- In office 12 December 1975 – 5 July 1976
- Monarch: Juan Carlos I
- Prime Minister: Carlos Arias Navarro
- Preceded by: Cruz Martínez Esteruelas
- Succeeded by: Aurelio Menéndez

Director general of popular culture and entertainment
- In office December 1967 – November 1969
- Succeeded by: Enrique Thomas de Carranza

Director general of information
- In office July 1962 – December 1967
- Preceded by: Vicente Rodríguez Casado

Personal details
- Born: 13 October 1925 Madrid, Spain
- Died: 8 February 2018 (aged 92) Madrid, Spain
- Party: People's Alliance

Carlos Robles Piquer (13 October 1925 – 8 February 2018) was a Spanish diplomat and politician.

== Political career ==
His political career started in 1962, when he was named director general of information. Robles was then appointed director general of the popular culture and entertainment. He served as minister of education between 1975 and 1976, before assuming the office of Secretary of State for Foreign Affairs. After a stint as Director General of RTVE, Robles was elected to the Congress of Deputies from Madrid. He left the national legislature in 1987, and became a member of the European Parliament for Spain until 1999.

Robles' marriage to Elisa Fraga Iribarne, the sister of Manuel Fraga Iribarne, produced a son, José María Robles Fraga, who is also a politician.
