= José Manuel Pérez Tornero =

Spanish researcher and journalist (born 1954)

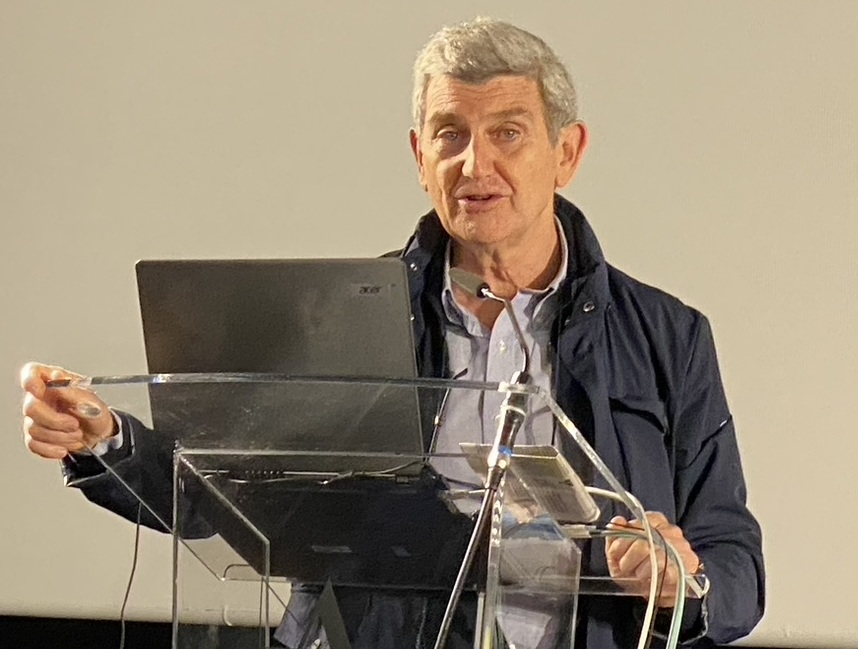

Chair of RTVE
- In office 26 March 2021 – 26 September 2022
- Preceded by: Rosa María Mateo (as Sole Administrator)
- Succeeded by: Elena Sánchez Caballero

Personal details
- Born: January 6, 1954 (age 72) Almería, Spain
- Occupation: Professor, researcher, journalist

José Manuel Pérez Tornero (born 1954) is a Spanish researcher and journalist. He is Professor of Journalism at the Autonomous University of Barcelona (UAB).

== Biography ==
Born in Almería in 1954. He earned a licentiate degree in Hispanic Philology and a PhD in Communication Sciences.

He was the creator of the educational TV show La aventura del saber. A member of the list of candidates to the Chairship of RTVE (and thus replace Rosa María Mateo), he was shortlisted as the prospective candidate after an agreement struck between the Spanish Socialist Workers' Party and the People's Party in February 2021. Voted by the Congress of Deputies as member of the administration board of RTVE together with Elena Sánchez Caballero, José Manuel Martín Medem, Carmen Sastre, Jenaro Castro and Juan José Baños with 249 votes in favour and 10 abstentions, he was sworn in as chairman of the public broadcasting corporation on 26 March 2021. He handed in his resignation on 26 September 2022, amid an "irreconcilably" divided administration board and clashes with the departments for Content and Newscast Services.

== Works ==
- El reto de la televisión educativa
- Libro Blanco de la Televisión educativa y cultural en Iberoamérica
- La televisión educativa
