= Agustí Forné López =

Spanish sports journalist (1962–2024)

- Born: 12 July 1962; Tarragona, Catalonia, Spain
- Died: 16 October 2024 (aged 62)

Agustí Forné López (22 July 1962 – 16 October 2024) was a Spanish sports and castells journalist.

A representative of the comarcas of Tarragona, Forné began his career in the field of journalism working at Cadena SER, in charge of sports information until 1987. He was particularly involved in working with Gimnàstic de Tarragona and Reus Ploms. He collaborated with Diari de Tarragona and Nou Diari de Reus. In 1989, he joined Televisió de Catalunya, where he worked as head of the Tarragona branch of TV3, dedicating himself to both general information and monitoring of the castellls world. In 2017, the presentation of the Quarts de Nou program began there.

Forné died suddenly of a stroke on 16 October 2024, at the age of 62.
