= Duke of Suárez =

Dukedom of Spain

Dukedom of Suárez
- Creation date: 25 February 1981
- Created by: Juan Carlos I
- Peerage: Peerage of Spain
- First holder: Adolfo Suárez González, 1st Duke of Suárez
- Present holder: Alejandra Romero Suárez, 2nd Duchess of Suárez

Duke of Suárez (Spanish: Duque de Suárez) is a hereditary title in the Spanish nobility. The dukedom was bestowed by King Juan Carlos on Adolfo Suárez González on 25 February 1981, following his resignation as Spanish Prime Minister, in recognition of his role in the Spanish transition to democracy. The Duke of Suárez is also a Grandee of Spain.

The current holder of the title is Alejandra Romero Suárez, Adolfo Suárez's granddaughter.

== Unsuccessful petition ==
Shortly after the first Duke's death in 2014, it was reported that in 2009 his son Adolfo Suárez Illana had unsuccessfully written to King Juan Carlos I to ask him to use the supposed historic powers of the Crown to alter the legal line of succession to make him heir to his father's title of Duke of Suárez instead of his niece Alejandra Suárez Romero, daughter and heir of Mariam Suárez Illana (his father's eldest child, who had died in 2004). This was on the basis that, although he himself cared little or nothing for the title, this had been the repeatedly expressed desire of his father, supported by the depositions of five witnesses. His father allegedly wanted the Dukes of Suárez to have his surname Suárez for many future generations, but Alzheimer's disease had made him both unable to decide the succession himself (as is permitted by Spanish law through Succession by Assignment), and also made him unaware that in 2006 the Equity Act for the Succession of Titles of Nobility (Spanish: Ley de Igualdad para la Sucesión de Títulos Nobiliarios) had removed male-preference cognatic primogeniture, thereby ensuring that the title would pass to his granddaughter rather than to his son. The failure of the petition was unsurprising given that the royal family itself had already expressed its support for a constitutional change to eliminate the preference for male rather than female succession to the Spanish throne, a matter which Socialist Prime Minister, José Luis Rodríguez Zapatero included in his inaugural speech in 2004.

== List of dukes of Suárez ==
- Adolfo Suárez González, 1st Duke of Suárez (1932–2014)
- Alejandra Romero Suárez, 2nd Duchess of Suárez (born 1990)
