= Luis Solana =

Spanish businessman and politician

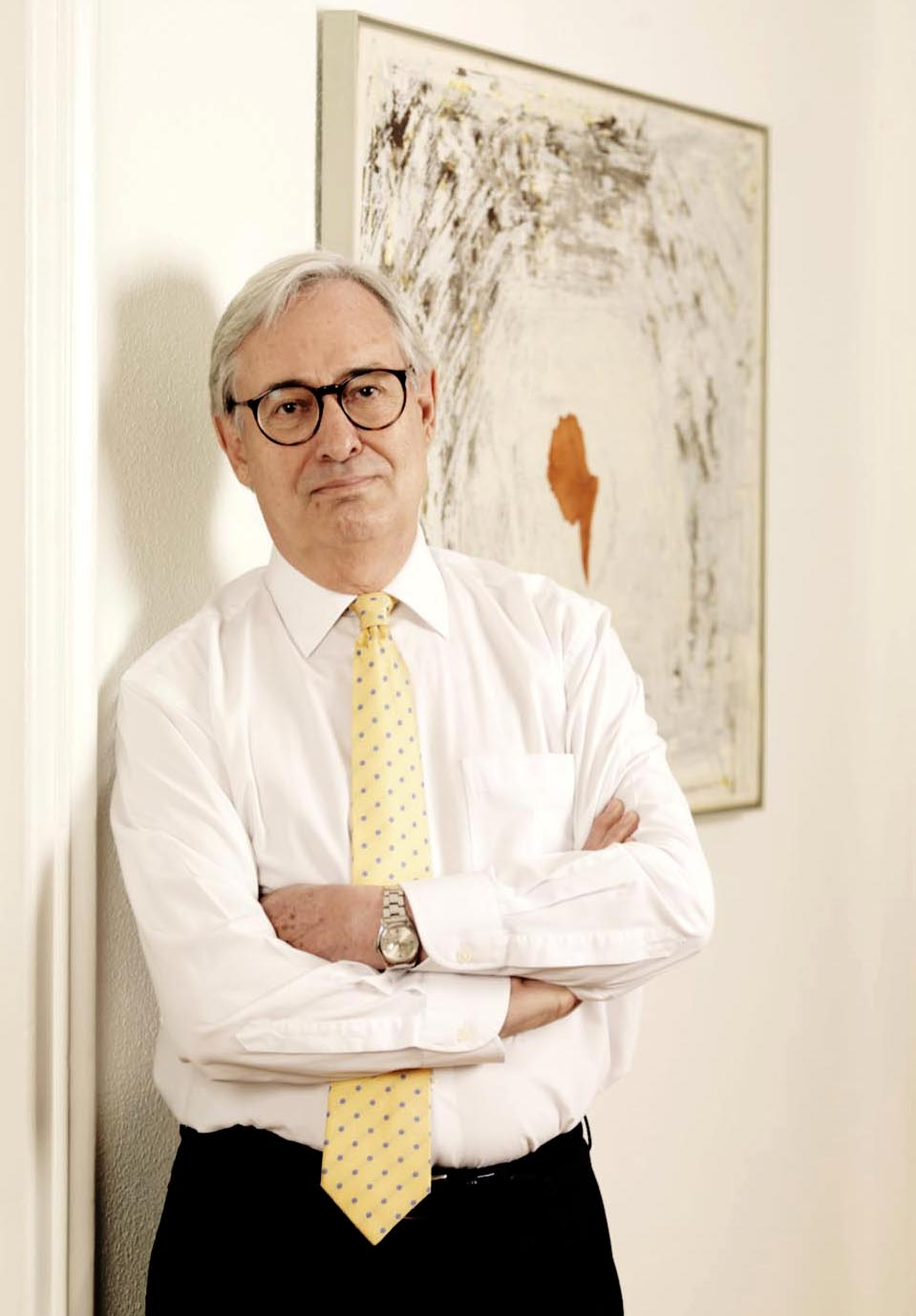

Member of the Congress of Deputies
- In office 1977–1983
- Constituency: Segovia

Personal details
- Born: 18 December 1935; Madrid, Spain
- Citizenship: Spanish
- Political party: Spanish Socialist Workers' Party
- Spouse: Leonor Pérez Pita (d. 2019)
- Occupation: Politician, businessman, economist, media executive

Luis Solana Madariaga (born 18 December 1935) is a Spanish businessman and politician.

== Biography ==
Born on 18 December 1935 in Madrid, he is an older brother of Javier Solana. He graduated in law at the Complutense University of Madrid, and later studied economics in London and Paris. A member of the University Socialist Grouping (ASU), he was jailed in 1959 by the Francoist dictatorship due to his political activities during his student years.

He married Leonor Pérez Pita, best known as 'Cuca Solana', pioneer of fashion in Spain and founder of the Pasarela Cibeles.

A member of the Spanish Socialist Workers' Party (PSOE), he was elected member of the Congress of Deputies in the 1977 general election in representation of Segovia. He was re-elected in the 1979 and 1982 general elections. In 1985 he became a member of the Spanish group of the Trilateral Commission.

He was the chairman of Telefónica from 1982 to 1989, when he was appointed as Director-General of RTVE. He later became chairman of Inversiones Graminsa, S.A (1991) and member of the board of directors of Amper (2004).

He was widowed in 2019.
