= Miguel Ángel Quintanilla Navarro =

Spanish politician (born 1967)

Member of the Congress of Deputies
- Incumbent
- Assumed office 13 December 2022
- Preceded by: Adolfo Suárez Illana
- Constituency: Madrid

Personal details
- Born: 28 October 1967 (age 58)
- Party: People's Party

Miguel Ángel Quintanilla Navarro (born 28 October 1967) is a Spanish politician serving as a member of the Congress of Deputies since 2022. He is a professor at the Francisco de Vitoria University.
