= Amparo Illana =

Wife of former Spanish prime minister Adolfo Suárez (1934–2001)

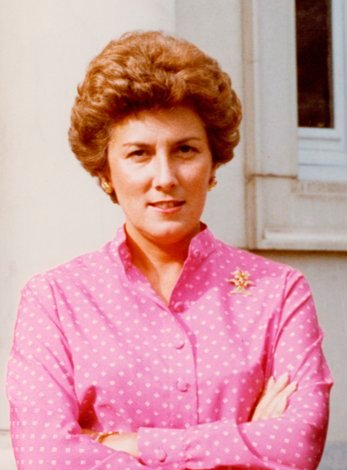
- Born: María del Amparo Illana Elórtegui; 25 May 1934; Madrid, Spain
- Died: 17 May 2001 (aged 66); Madrid, Spain
- Resting place: Ávila Cathedral, Ávila, Spain
- Spouse: Adolfo Suárez (m. 1961)
- Children: 5, including Adolfo

Amparo Illana, Duchess of Suárez (25 May 1934 – 17 May 2001) was a Spanish noble woman who was the wife of Adolfo Suárez, prime minister of Spain between 1976 and 1981.

== Biography ==
Illana was born in Madrid on 25 May 1934 into a family of Basque origin. Her father was a colonel in the army. She studied English in Ireland and French at a boarding school in France.

She met Adolfo Suárez in Ávila during a summer vacation. Suárez was a native of the town. They married there on 15 July 1961. Her family contributed to the political career of Suárez. Illana was close to the Opus Dei, a Catholic group, and her husband was also a member of the group. She was involved in philanthropic activities with a special focus on the Gitanos or Romani people in Spain. She organized a meeting about their problems in Madrid in 1978 in collaboration with the Opus Dei.

Illana had five children with Suárez: María Amparo, Adolfo, Laura, Sonsoles and Javier. Illana was diagnosed with breast cancer in 1994 and died in Madrid on 17 May 2001. She was buried in Ávila Cathedral, Ávila, on 18 May. Her husband would also be buried there next to her in March 2014.
