= Radio Televisión Madrid =

- Company type: sociedad anónima
- Genre: Public broadcasting service
- Founded: 1984 (as ente público); 2016 (as sociedad anónima)
- Headquarters: Pozuelo de Alarcón, Community of Madrid, Spain
- Area served: Community of Madrid
- Key people: José Pablo López, Director General
- Services: Television, radio, online
- Owner: Regional administration
- Divisions: Telemadrid, LaOtra, Onda Madrid
- Website: Official website

Radio Televisión Madrid S.A. (RTVM) is the public broadcaster of the Community of Madrid.

== History ==
The Ente Público Radio Televisión Madrid was created by means of a 1984 law, during the government of Joaquín Leguina, with the endorsement of all parliamentary forces. The Onda Madrid radio station began its broadcast on 18 February 1985. Telemadrid began its broadcast on 2 May 1989.

In 2015, the regional government of Cristina Cifuentes lined up a plan to transform the ente público into a sociedad anónima. The sociedad anónima Radio Televisión Madrid was thus created in 2016 by means of a law passed by the Assembly of Madrid in December 2015, and the S.A. assumed full control over the regional broadcasting services on 17 March 2017, inheriting the assets of the Ente Público as well as Telemadrid and Onda Madrid, transferred by means of a merging by absorption.

== Divisions ==
Channel's logo	Type of programming
	Telemadrid. Flagship TV channel.
	LaOtra. Secondary TV channel.
	Onda Madrid Radio station.
