= Elena Sánchez Caballero =

Spanish journalist (born 1957)

Elena Sánchez

Acting Chair of RTVE
- In office 27 September 2022 – 26 March 2024
- Preceded by: José Manuel Pérez Tornero
- Succeeded by: Concepción Cascajosa

Personal details
- Born: Elena Sánchez Caballero; 25 December 1957 (age 68) Madrid, Spain
- Education: Complutense University of Madrid
- Occupation: Television journalist, executive

Elena Sánchez Caballero (born 25 December 1957) is a Spanish journalist. Since August 2018, she has been RTVE's corporate secretary general, a member of the team led by Rosa María Mateo. From 2008 to 2014 she was RTVE's viewer ombudsman.

== Biography ==
After receiving a licentiate in journalism at the Complutense University of Madrid, Elena Sánchez Caballero started her professional career at the EFE news agency in 1982. Two years later, she joined Televisión Española (TVE), where she initially focused on sports journalism. From 1986 to 1987 she presented Buenos días, Spanish television's first morning news program.

After a brief stint on the program La tarde, she joined the Telediario team in 1987, alongside Luis Mariñas, Pedro Piqueras, Luis de Benito, and Ramón Pellicer, where she stayed until September 1996.

On New Year's Eve 1991, Sánchez was part of the trio of Telepasión Española presenters with Constantino Romero and Joaquín Prat.

In 1996 she was assigned to present news on the channel 24 Horas. In 2004 she returned to Telediario, taking charge of its third edition, while also working on the program Crónicas. In 2006 she left Telediario to replace Pedro Piqueras in presenting and directing the debate program Enfoque, on air until 2007.

In March 2008, Sánchez was named RTVE's ombudsman for the viewer, the listener, and the user of interactive media, a new position created to respond to the complaints and questions of the audience. She also assumed direction and presentation of the show RTVE responde. She was replaced by Carmen Sastre in April 2014. In April 2015 she began directing and presenting the gastronomic show Al punto. She later joined the program Imprescindibles, co-directing documentaries about Luis del Olmo (2017) and Iñaki Gabilondo (2018). In 2018 she submitted her candidacy for the public tender to head the RTVE Corporation.

On 1 August 2018, she was appointed corporate general secretary of RTVE on the team led by provisional administrator Rosa María Mateo.

On 25 February 2021, she was appointed by the Cortes Generales as member of the Board of Directors of RTVE.

On 27 September 2022, the Board appointed her as acting chair. On 26 March 2024, the Board removed her from office after her internal conflicts with the content director, who was also removed.
