= Jesús Aparicio-Bernal =

Spanish politician (born 1929)

- Born: Jesús Aparicio-Bernal Sánchez; June 15, 1929; Madrid, Spain
- Died: June 19, 2024 (aged 95); Madrid, Spain

Jesús Aparicio-Bernal Sánchez (June 15, 1929 – June 19, 2024) was a Spanish politician who began his career under the Francoist State.

== Biography ==
Having read jurisdiction at university, Aparicio-Bernal became a representative (procurador) to the Cortes Generales during the Francoist era, first as a trade union representative in 1955, 1958, and 1961, and for Alicante between 1967 and 1977.

He was also the national director of the Sindicato Español Universitario (SEU), the university syndicate of the Spanish Falange movement, from 1957 to February 1962. Rodolfo Martín Villa succeeded him in the post. In 1963, Aparicio-Bernal was designated as president of the Sindicato Nacional de Prensa y Gráficas.

On 26 March 1964, Manuel Fraga Iribarne, then Minister for Information and Tourism, appointed him as the Director General of Radio Difusión y Televisión, a position equivalent to the current Chair of Corporación de Radio y Televisión Española. In this capacity, on 18 July of the same year, Aparicio-Bernal ordered the creation of Televisión Española studios at Prado del Rey in Pozuelo de Alarcón, the current central headquarters of the corporation.

As an adjunct professor, he also taught business law at the Complutense University of Madrid. Aparicio-Bernal identifies as a secular humanist and an atheist, and is strongly critical of religion.

Media offices
Preceded by Roque Pro	Director General of RTVE; 1964–1969	Succeeded by Adolfo Suárez
