= Chair of RTVE =

Head of the Spanish Radio and Television Corporation

- Presidente de RTVE
- RTVE Corporation logo

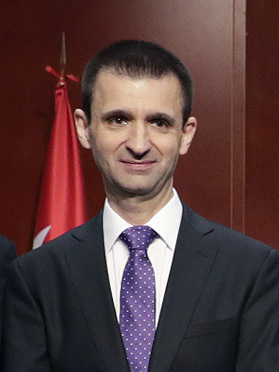
- Incumbent; José Pablo López since 2 December 2024
- Spanish Radio and Television Corporation
- Style: The Most Excellent
- Member of: RTVE Board
- Reports to: Congress of Deputies; RTVE Board
- Seat: Prado del Rey, Pozuelo de Alarcón (Madrid). Spain
- Appointer: Congress of Deputies
- Term length: Six years, no renewable
- Constituting instrument: Radio and Television of State Ownership Act of 2006
- Precursor: Director-General of RTVE
- First holder: Luis Fernández Fernández
- Salary: €216,142.19 annually (2021)

The Chair of RTVE, officially Chair of the Spanish Radio and Television Corporation, is the head of the RTVE Corporation and of the RTVE Board. The chair of RTVE is the chief executive of the corporation and chairs the Board, convene its meetings and execute its guidelines. The chair is appointed by the majority of the Congress of Deputies.

Currently, the office is held by José Pablo López.

== Powers ==
The powers of the chair of the RTVE Board and of the RTVE Corporation are regulated in Section II of the Radio and Television of State Ownership Act of 2006:

- To execute and enforce the agreements of the board
- To prepare the formulation of the annual accounts of each fiscal year in accordance with commercial legislation
- To prepare the operating and capital budget draft of the RTVE Corporation
- To prepare the annual report on the management of the RTVE Corporation and its subsidiaries and on the fulfillment of the public service missions entrusted, the program contract with the State and the other economic and financial obligations assumed by the RTVE Corporation due to its public nature
- To execute the general guidelines of action of the RTVE Corporation approved by the Board, as well as execute the principles that the said body approves on production, commercial activity and programming on state radio and television
- To approve and celebrate the acts, contracts and legal business in matters and amounts agreed by the board
- To propose to the Board the approval of the basic organization of the RTVE Corporation and its subsidiaries
- To propose to the Board the appointment and removal of the first level officials of the RTVE Corporation
- To direct and coordinate the activities of the governing bodies of the RTVE Corporation in accordance with the guidelines of the board
- To propose to the Board the appointment and removal, at the General Meeting, of the administrators of the subsidiaries
- The senior management of the staff and services of the RTVE Corporation under the basic guidelines established by the board
- To be responsible for the automated files of the RTVE Corporation and ensure compliance with personal data protection legislation
- During an electoral process, to act as a communication body between the electoral administration and the board

=== Delegation of powers ===
In accordance with article 21 of the Radio and Television of State Ownership Act, the Board may delegate to the President any other power of the Board, which will require the approval of the majority of two thirds of its components. However, the law itself limits this delegation; the Board cannot delegate its powers in matters related to the appointment of first-level personnel, to economic-budgetary matters, to internal control bodies, those related to the fundamental right of Article 20.3 of the Constitution or the proposal to remove a member of the Board.

== Appointment, removal and sole administrator ==
=== Appointment ===
In accordance with Royal Decree-Law 4/2018, of June 22, which specifies, urgently, the legal regime applicable to the designation of the Board of the RTVE Corporation and its Chair, the Congress of Deputies is the body responsible for electing the Chair of the Corporation and of the Board, by a two-thirds majority, among the ten members that make up the Board. If this majority is not reached and, after 48 hours, the Congress must vote again and an absolute majority will be sufficient to confirm the candidate to Chair of RTVE.

=== Removal ===
The removal of the chair of the Corporation complies with the general requirements for the removal of the rest of the members of the Board:

- Resignation
- End of the term
- Removal approved by a two-thirds majority of the Congress of Deputies, at the proposal of the RTVE Board, by:
  - Permanent inability to exercise the office
  - Firm conviction for any malicious crime
  - A conflict of interest with other office or personal activity
  - Reasoned agreement
- Decision of the Congress of Deputies by a two-thirds majority of its members

=== Sole administrator ===
The position of sole administrator is a figure included in the Capital Companies Act of 2010. The sole administrator is a position that assumes all the powers of a company for its administration. The Radio and Television of State Ownership Act includes this possibility, although in its article 22 it prohibits that the Chair of the Corporation that has been removed, along with the rest of the Board, due to a bad economic management may occupy this position.

In 2018, a reform was introduced in the form of the election of the chair, which requires that if after fifteen days, there were still not enough majorities to appoint the Board members, the Government shall propose a sole provisional administrator to assume the powers of both the Board and the Chair of the Corporation with the same previous procedure. This Sole Provisional Administrator shall be responsible for the administration and representation of the Corporation until the appointments of the Board members occur. This exceptional clause was first used on 27 July 2018, naming Rosa María Mateo as sole administrator with 180 votes in favor of the 350 possible. As such, Mateo assumed all the powers of the chairship and the Board of Directors until the appointment of a new Chair on 26 March 2021.

== List of chairs ==
=== Director Generals of Radiodifusión y Televisión ===
- José María Revuelta Prieto (1957–1962)
- Roque Pro Alonso (1962–1964)
- Jesús Aparicio-Bernal Sánchez (1964–1969)
- Adolfo Suárez González (1969–1973)
- Rafael Orbe Cano (1973–1974)
- Juan José Rosón Pérez (1974)
- Jesús Sancho Rof (1974–1975)
- Gabriel Peña Aranda (1975–1976)
- Rafael Anson Oliart (1976–1977)

=== Director General of Organismo Autónomo RTVE ===
- Fernando Arias-Salgado Montalvo (1977–1981)

=== Director Generals of Ente Público RTVE ===
- Fernando Castedo Álvarez (1981)
- Carlos Robles Piquer (1981–1982)
- Eugenio Nasarre Goicoechea (1982)
- José María Calviño Iglesias (1982–1986)
- Pilar Miró Romero (1986–1989)
- Luis Solana Madariaga (1989–1990)
- Jordi García Candau (1990–1996)
- Mónica Ridruejo Ostrowska (1996–1997)
- Fernando López-Amor García (1997–1998)
- Pío Cabanillas Alonso (1998–2000)
- Javier González Ferrari (2000–2002)
- José Antonio Sánchez Domínguez (2002–2004)
- Carmen Caffarel Serra (2004–2007)

=== President of Corporación RTVE ===
- Luis Fernández Fernández (2007–2009)
- Alberto Oliart Saussol (2009–2011)
- Leopoldo González-Echenique Castellanos de Ubao (2011–2014)
- José Antonio Sánchez Domínguez (2014–2018)
- Rosa María Mateo Isasi (2018–2021) (as Sole Administrator)
- José Manuel Pérez Tornero (2021–2022)
- Elena Sánchez Caballero (Acting: 2022–2024)
- Concepción Cascajosa (Acting: 2024)
- José Pablo López (2024–)
