= Summer Festival of Reus =

Festival in Catalonia

The Summer Festival of Reus (Catalan: Festa Major de Reus) is considered the most important festival of Reus. It is also known as the festival of Saint Peter. In addition, this celebration has been named as a Traditional Festival of National Interest by the Generalitat (Government of Catalonia). It has dozens of events which revolve around the tronada (the most revered daytime fireworks show).

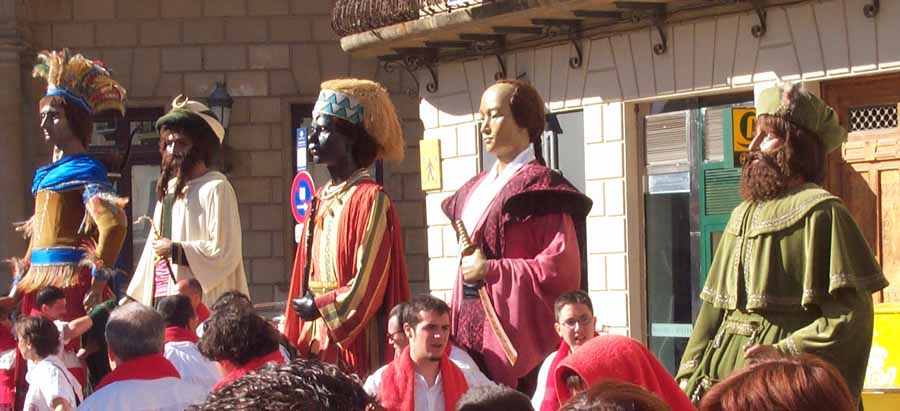
Giants of Reus

== History ==
St. Peter's and St. Paul's Day, held on 29 June, has been celebrated in Reus since its foundation in the 12th century. One of the earliest streets known in the town was renamed as St. Peter street in 1368. A new square called St. Peter's Square was built in front of the church in the 17th century, in 1611. The devotion to Saint Peter increased in 1625 and 1626, when a relic of the saint was brought to town, and a big celebration was prepared to receive it. It was announced for 7 November 1625. Since the arrival of the relic, St. Peter's Day has been a special date in the holiday calendar of Reus.

The procession has been the core of the celebration of the Summer Festival of Reus for many years. It is always accompanied by a festive entourage, and the competent authorities in town. Religious ceremonies were suppressed because of the 1868 Glorious Revolution of Spain, but the parades of Giants and the Mulassa (the figure of a mule) remained. The dances of the festive entourage, parties and balls also remained among the society in the city. Following the Restoration, the festivity returned to its traditional and religious events. The city did not celebrate another secular festival until the Second Spanish Republic, but since 1900 there have been intense debates about the involvement of councillors in processions or municipal aid for religious events. Since the 1980s, the festival has returned as a "traditional popular festivity". Some traditional components have been revived and others created.

An important part of the components forming the current festive entourage of Reus were already documented in the 17th and the 18th centuries. The figure of the giants, the Mulassa, the dance of sticks, the dwarves and the devils have remained present throughout the years without interruption. Other old dances disappeared between the 18th and 19th centuries and were later recovered in the late 20th century. The gypsy dance, the dance of Joan de Vic, the dance of Prims, the Cercolets dance, the dance of the little horses, the dance of the Valencian people, the Galeras dance, the Bull of Reus, the dance of the Ladies and the Old Men, and the Eagle have been reintroduced to the festivity in an attempt to try and continue with the traditional events the old documents in town specify. Some of these elements are exceptional because they can only be viewed in Reus, as is the case of the dance of Prims, the dance of Joan de Vic, or the Galeras dance. Moreover, new elements have also been incorporated, based on typical elements of Catalonia. For example, the Cannon, the Giant Carrasclet, the dragon, the viper, the basilisk, the masquerade, the spoken dance of carrasclet, and the castles. These last ones, present in Reus since the 19th century, represent Reus' status as a fortified city.

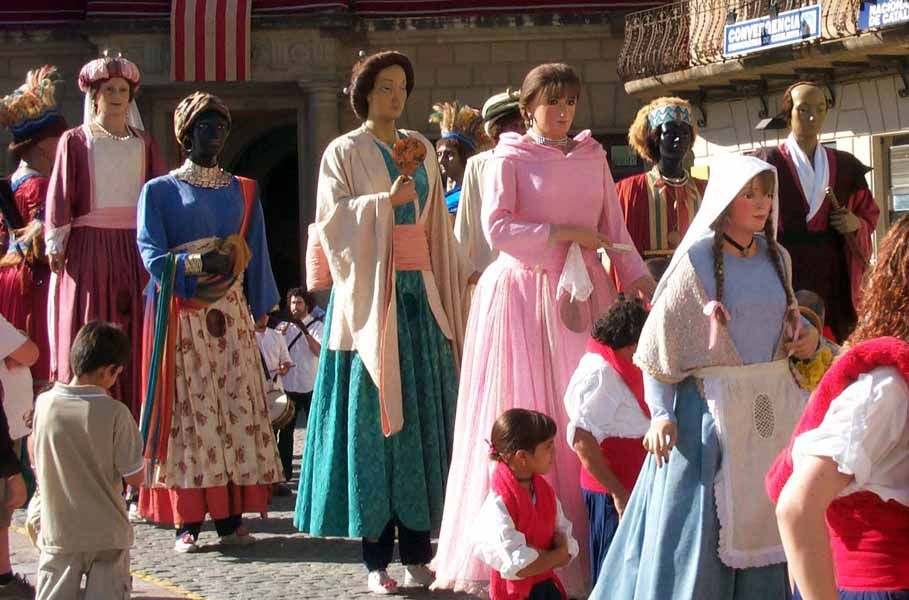
Giants of Reus

== Description ==
The central and final day of the festival is celebrated on Saint Peter's day, 29 June, but there are several activities that are held before. The festival begins immediately after Saint John's festivities, celebrated on Mid Summer's Eve across Catalonia (Flama de Canigó) on 23 June. This solstice stretches out across the towns of the Baix Camp (a region in Catalonia), the parade of the giant Carrasclet, the parade of fire or the Devil's dance, and the bonfire. On 24 June, in the Plenary Hall of the city, the Pregó (the opening of the festival) takes place. When finished, the award Tro de Festa is given to a distinguished person for having made an anonymous contribution to the festival. The pregoner ("town crier or bellman" in English), accompanied by a group of minstrels, makes an appeal from the balcony of the town hall and goes down to the Mercadal square in order to light off the first "tronada" of the festival. From the 25th to the 27th, a cannon goes outside in order to announce the festival. On 27th the Festa major Petita ("the small festival" in English) begins with small groups of children parading (they participate with traditional dances, depiction of biblical characters, allegorical representations, etc.).

During the days from Saint John to Saint Peter, there are several festive events such as the Masclet (typical festival's drink) parade, the Cossos (traditional games tournament), a traditional dinner made of beef and rice or the theatrical performance of the dance of the Ladies and the Old Men. The Saturday preceding Saint Peter, the Diada Castellera (name of a gathering where colles build castells) of Saint Peter is held. They also dance sardanes (Catalan popular dance), they hold all kind of concerts, fireworks, Barraques de Festa Major (concerts), etc. The week of the events culminates on the eve of Saint Peter, on 28 June. From 9 am to 5 pm, you can hear the bell of the tower ringing on the occasion of the festival, and see the parade of festive groups of the city, groups such as: L'Àguila (The eagle), Els Gegants (The giants), Els Nanos (The dwarves) and La Mulassa (The mule). At 8 pm, the seguici from Reus, with the relevant authorities, do a walk around St. Peter's Priory. During the ceremony, the image of the saint is taken out from the church. The image is normally saved in a closed altar under a triple lock. The keys are held by the Major of the city, and Saint Peter's prior. Formerly, they were also held by the community of priests. Nowadays, one of these keys is held by the oldest Monsignor of the city. After returning to the church, the second "tronada" begins, and then a firework explodes. This firework gives way to a series of activities in different parts of the city, lasting until dawn.

In St. Peter's Day, 29 June at 7 am, a parade formed by diverse groups of grallers and tabalers (musicians playing traditional music) takes place in the early morning. At 9 am, people normally light up firecrackers on el despertar de Reus ("the awakening of Reus"). At 10 am, the doors of the bell tower are open for the citizens, the only day of the year it can be visited.

At half past eleven in the morning, the third tronada explodes and the exhibition of folkloric groups takes place in the middle of Mercadal Square. Later, they carry out the performance of the human towers with the Xiquets de Reus, which is the main group of human towers in Reus. On 29 June, the Seguici Festiu (a set of festive elements participating in the parades and processions), the authorities and the public meet again in Mercadal Square. They go in procession until St. Peter's Priory to search for the image of the patron saint, which is carried in procession until Mercadal Square and just at the time when it stops before the City Hall the last tronada is launched. During the procession, from the bell-tower, the Toc General de Festa (an event in which people ring a big bell) is performed. Afterwards, the Seguici returns to St. Peter's Priory and at the time the Image enters the church, all festive elements burst into dance at the same time. As a culmination to the festivities, the gegants bicentenaris ("bicentennial giants") and the Águila ("The eagle") return to the Square to perform the last dances, followed by a bunch of demons who are in charge of closing the festivity.

Some elements of the Seguici Festiu have their counterpart in the celebration of the Festa Major Petita, and they form the Seguici Festiu Petit (it is the same as the Seguici Festiu but with the participation of children). It all started in 1997, when the Colla gegantera (a group of local entertainment of the city) created the gegantons Fadrins (a sort of giants who make different dances) and then the Mulassa petita (the same as the Mulassa but for children), due to the large number of boys and girls who participated at the trips of the colla (group of friends or partners of a common activity). Now, on 27 June the Festa Major Petita begins, with all the festive elements that follow the guidelines of the big ones. We have today, aside from the gegants and the mulassa, the dance of the devils for children, the dance of bastons (sticks) for children, the Drac ("The Dragon") for children, the Dance of the 'Valencian children', the Dance of the gypsies for children, Nanos ("The dwarves") for children, the dance of cercolets for children, the Dance of prims for children and the Dance of pastorets ("shepherds") for children.

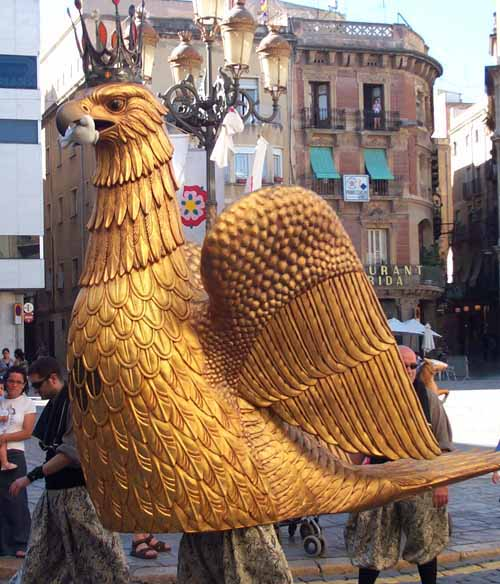
Eagle in Reus

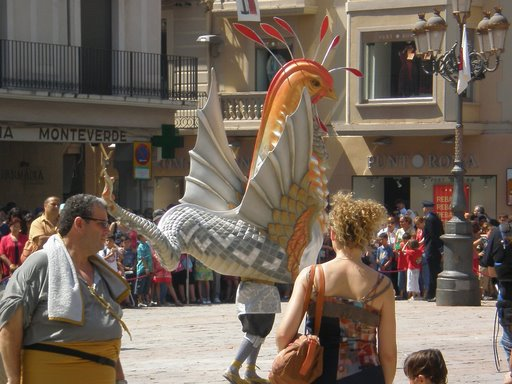
Basilisk in Reus

== Barraques in Reus ==
Barraques in Reus is a set of concerts and festive activities performed in Reus as a starting point for the festivities of Saint Peter. They are held during Saint John's day. They usually last four days, although in 2009 they lasted five, for their tenth anniversary. Saint John's festivity is the most remarkable date in town. The Coordination Group of Barraques in Reus consists of different entities, currently 24, forming the entity that organises the whole festivity in different sectors. From the early years, the festivity of Barraques was performed in the Mas d'Iglésies of Reus, a green area rather isolated from the centre, but not too far away. The area was of quick access and had a good seating area. From 2008 the location changed and it started to be performed at the Roquís, at the Parc de la Festa, a waste ground located next to the municipal swimming-pools of Reus. This change of location initially provoked much criticism in the City Hall. Among the bands that acted, we can highlight Mesclat, Habeas Corpus, Obrint Pas, Lax'n'Busto, Companyia Elèctrica Dharma, Soziedad alkohólika, Al Tall, Kiko Veneno, Els Pets, Barricada and The Pinker Tones.

Other activities are performed during the festival, such as a contest to make the poster of Barraques and trips to different villages where they conduct their own festivals.
