= LaOtra =

- Country: Spain
- Broadcast area: Community of Madrid

Programming
- Language(s): Spanish
- Picture format: 1080i HDTV

Ownership
- Owner: Radio Televisión Madrid

History
- Launched: 19 March 2001; 24 years ago

LaOtra ("TheOther") is the second television channel of the Radio Televisión Madrid public broadcasting network in the Community of Madrid, Spain.

Launched in 2001, the channel broadcast a range of cultural programming including music and art. After a restructuring in 2006, it now also broadcasts children's programming, news and information from Madrid, history documentaries, sport, film and entertainment programming.

It airs 24 hours a day in the Spanish language through DTT and other services, aired through analogue on UHF channel 40 until 30 June 2009.

== Logos ==
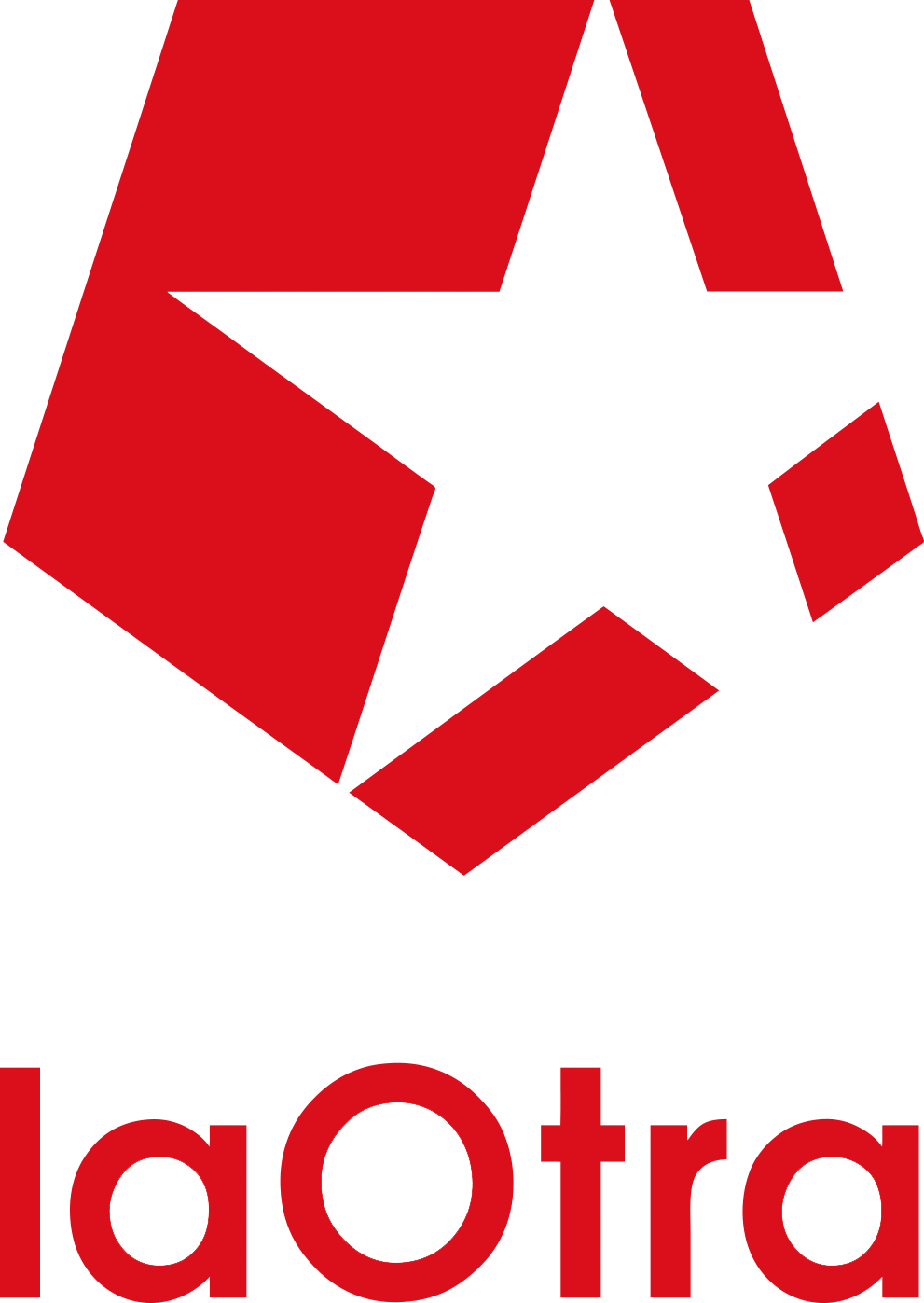
Second logo of LaOtra from 2005 to 2014

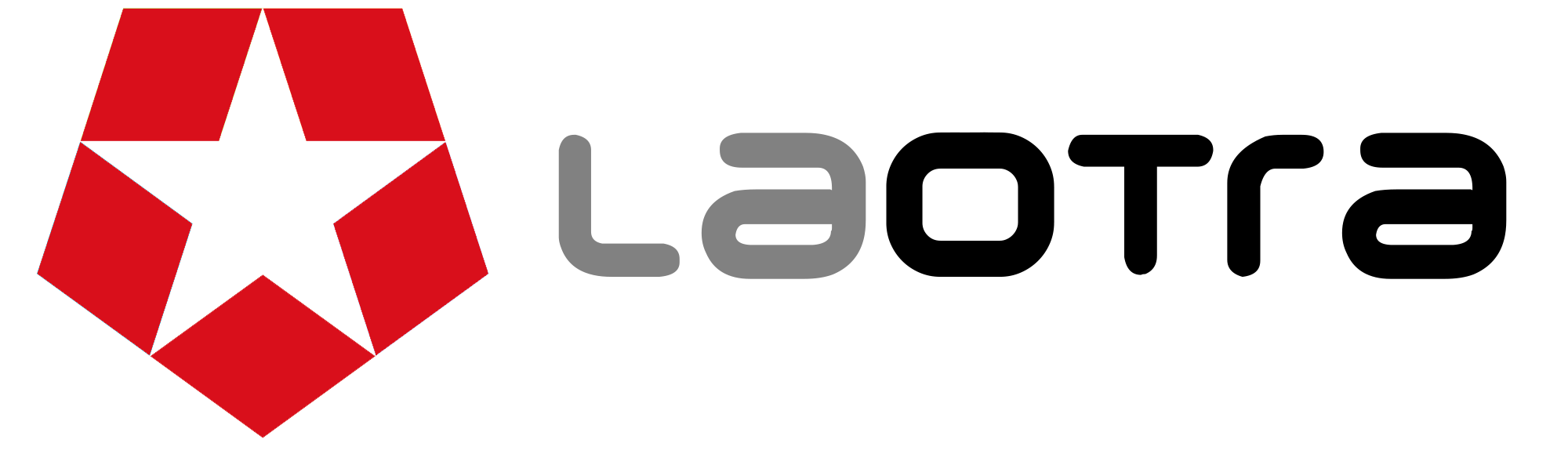
The Third logo of LaOtra used from 2014 to 2017
