= Eugenio Nasarre =

Spanish politician (1946–2024)

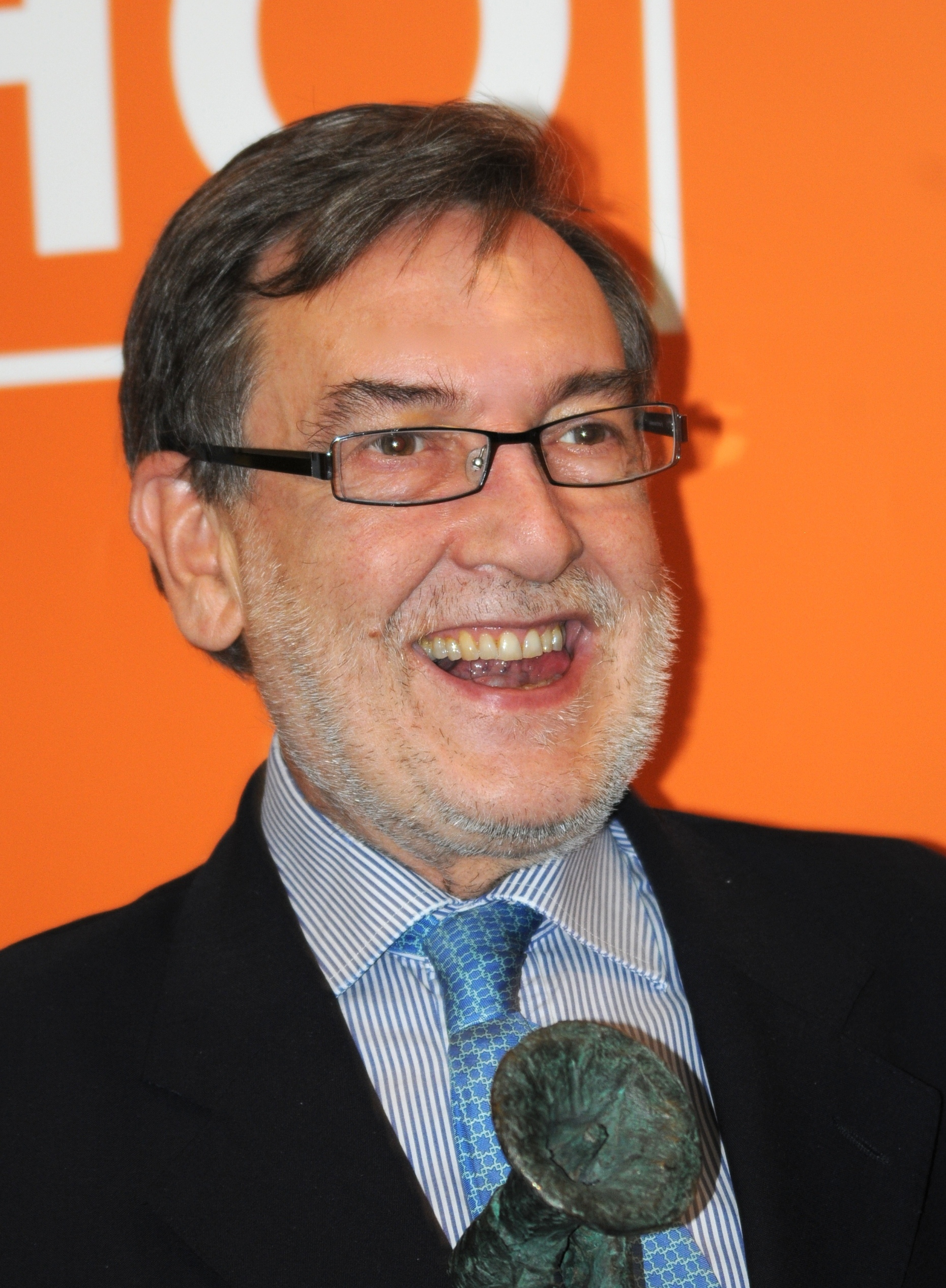
- Nasarre in 2009

Member of the Congress of Deputies
- In office 12 May 2011 – 27 October 2015
- Constituency: Granada
- In office 24 March 2008 – 27 September 2011
- Constituency: Jaén
- In office 23 March 2000 – 15 January 2008
- Constituency: Madrid

Director General of RTVE
- In office 15 March 1982 – 1 December 1982
- Preceded by: Carlos Robles Piquer
- Succeeded by: José María Calviño

Personal details
- Born: 2 March 1946 Madrid, Spain
- Died: 27 January 2024 (aged 77)
- Party: Democratic Left; People's Party; Union of the Democratic Centre

Eugenio Nasarre Goicoechea (2 March 1946 – 27 January 2024) was a Spanish politician.

Born in Madrid, he was Director General of RTVE in 1982. Nasarre then served in the Congress of Deputies between 2000 and 2015. He represented Madrid for two terms, and was elected to one term each by voters in Jaén and Granada.

His son has cerebral palsy. Eugenio Nasarre died on 27 January 2024, at the age of 77.
