= El rival más débil =

Spanish version of game show Weakest Link

El rival más débil (literally "The Weakest Rival") is the Spanish version of the international game show franchise Weakest Link. The show aired on La 1 and La 2 of Televisión Española between 2002 and 2004, presented by Nuria González and later Karmele Aranburu. The series was revived for Telecinco in 2024, with six celebrity specials presented by Luján Argüelles. These were cancelled after three episodes, with the remainder being aired a year later.

== History ==
The international franchise Weakest Link began with British series The Weakest Link, and debuted in Spain on La 1 on 15 May 2002. The first season was presented by Nuria González, who left to act in Los Serrano and was replaced by Karmele Aranburu. The programme moved to La 2, also owned by Televisión Española, and aired its final episode on 1 October 2004.

In March 2024, it was announced that the show would return to television, with a six-episode series on Telecinco to be presented by Luján Argüelles. The episodes were celebrity specials, respectively for singers, politicians, comedians, journalists, actors and sportspeople.

The first episode aired on 4 September with a 6.5% audience share, followed by 6.9% and 7.7% in the next two weeks, respectively. The next two episodes were pre-empted for tabloid discussion show ¡De viernes!, due to the death of former Marbella mayor Julián Muñoz, and a historical affair of King Juan Carlos I. By 9 October, the show had been cancelled, with 2003 film Bad Boys II airing in its place. The final three episodes of the series aired from 14 August 2025, filling the time slot vacated by the conclusion of Volando voy, volando vengo.

== Format ==
Contestants answer general knowledge questions against the clock, aiming to bank as much money as possible. At the end of each round, the contestants name the player they wish to vote off, and the one with the most votes against is eliminated. When two contestants are left, they are each asked five questions and the one with the most correct answers wins; in the case of a draw, there is "sudden death" until one answers correctly and the other incorrectly.

The 2024 revival had a maximum possible jackpot of €50,000, to be awarded to a charitable cause as all contestants were celebrities.
