= Rosa María Mateo =

Spanish journalist and television news anchor

The Most Excellent Rosa María Mateo
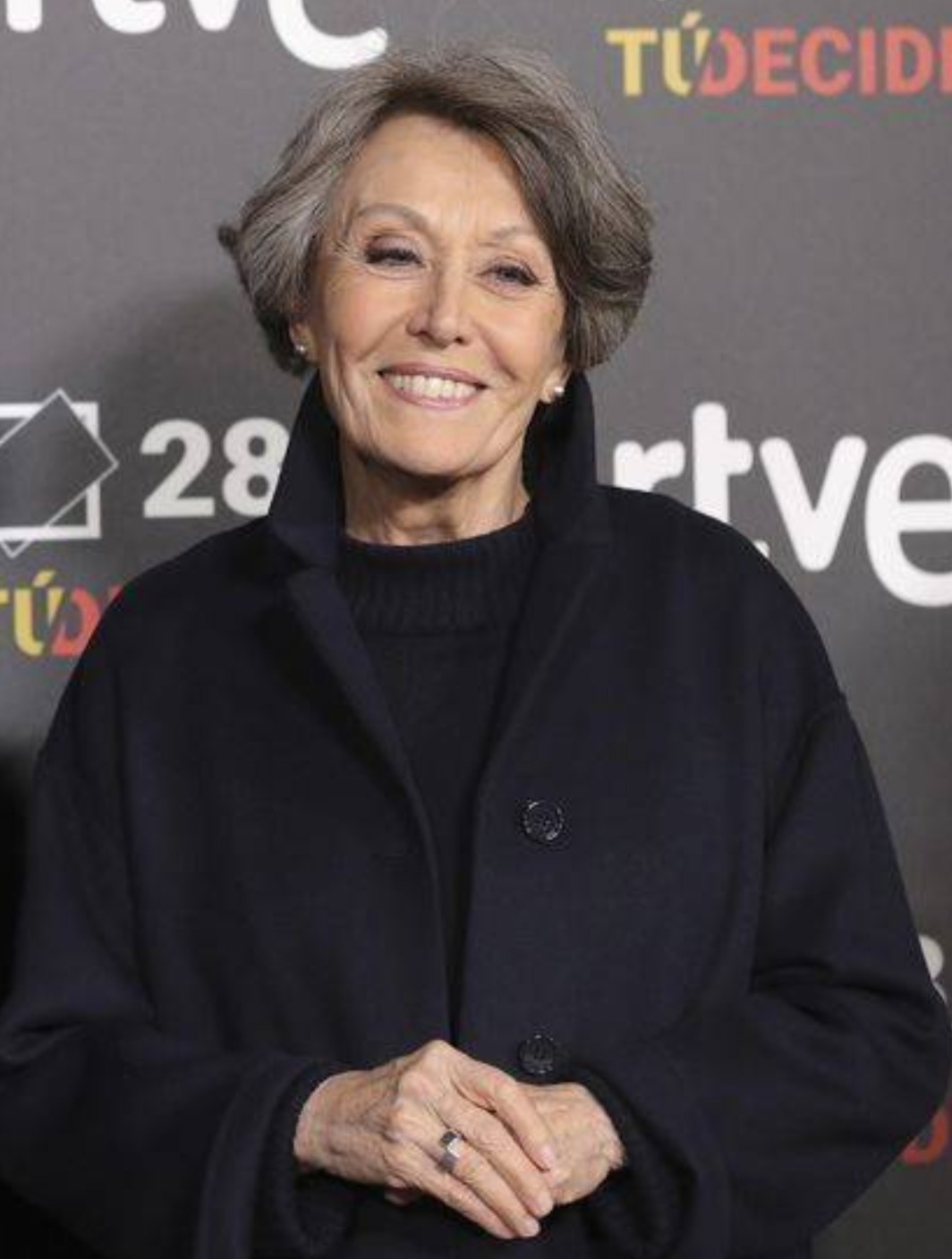

Chair of RTVE (as Sole Administrator)
- In office 27 July 2018 – 26 March 2021
- Preceded by: José Antonio Sánchez Domínguez
- Succeeded by: José Manuel Pérez Tornero

Personal details
- Born: Rosa María Mateo Isasi; January 6, 1942 (age 84) Burgos, Spain
- Spouses: Germán Ponte (m. 1965, divorced) Manuel Leguineche (div. 1980) Miguel Rellán (m. 2000)
- Children: 1
- Education: Complutense University of Madrid
- Occupation: Journalist

Rosa María Mateo Isasi (born 6 January 1942), is a Spanish journalist and renowned television news anchor during the Transition. From July 2018 to March 2021, she served as the Provisional Sole Administrator of RTVE, the national public radio and television media. As such, Mateo assumed all the powers of the chairship and the Board of Directors.

== Biography ==
Daughter of a soldier, her first years of life take place in the different destinies of his father: from Burgos to Madrid and then to Valencia. There she began to study law, career where there were only 10 female students, at the same time she discovered her fondness for theater. She has a degree in Law and Journalism from the Complutense University of Madrid.

She also studied Political Science, although she did not complete it, as well as Interpretation at the Official School of Cinematography. Since the 1990s she maintains a relation with the Spanish actor Miguel Rellán.

== Career ==
In 1963, she obtained a position as an announcer in Radio Nacional de España, in 1966, joining the news services of Spanish television. In a first stage, she developed her career in La 2, then known as UHF, in programs such as La segunda cadena informa in 1968.

At the beginning of the 70s she moved to the La 1, joining first the informative Buenas tardes. Her popularity increases when she was designated, in 1972, for the presentation of the first OTI Festival.

Her consecration takes place with her incorporation into the prestigious space Pedro Erquicia Informe Semanal, where remained until 1980. Nicknamed as "the Muse of the Transition", after the attempted coup d'État of 23 February 1981 Mateo was chosen by consensus of all political parties to read the condemnation manifesto.

She has also presented the newscast, until 1993 when she was booked by Antena 3 to take charge of her news program Antena 3 Noticias at weekends. She worked in the channel until 2003 when her contract was terminated because of a layoff.

Mateo was, according to a report in 1990 by the audiovisual department of journalism at the Faculty of Information Sciences of the University of La Laguna, the host of RTVE that higher levels of popular acceptance got. She openly criticized the treatment that television media gives to women in general, and to those who work in news programs in particular.

In 2010 she received the Gold Medal of Merit for Work, granted by the Ministry of Labor and Immigration. On the other hand, in the campaign for the general elections of 2011 she publicly expressed her support for the PSOE candidate Alfredo Pérez Rubalcaba.

On November 16, 2013, she planted and nurtured a tree with her name in the Communication Park of Boiro (A Coruña), the only one in Spain created by journalists. On that day, she also received the Honorary Exxpopress Award in Boiro. 2013 in recognition of her long and successful professional career, granted by the Club Exxpopress de Periodistas de Galicia.

In April 2014 she intervenes making a cameo in the Rescatando a Sara series produced by Atresmedia.

== Sole Administrator of RTVE ==
After difficulties in approving the appointment of a Chair of RTVE, on 19 July 2018, the new government of Pedro Sánchez proposed Mateo as the "sole administrator" of Spanish Broadcasting Company (RTVE), a provisional position to direct the public body until the approval of a new chair and Board by public tender. Her candidacy was approved on July 27 of the same year by the Congress of Deputies, and took office on 30 July. On 26 March 2021, a new Chair, José Manuel Pérez Tornero, was appointed.

== TV programs ==
- La segunda cadena informa (1968)
- Buenas tardes (1970-1973)
- OTI Festival (1972)
- Informe Semanal (1974-1980)
- Telediario (1973-1993)
- Crónica 3 (1981) with Jesús Hermida
- Fila 7 (1983)
- Al filo de la ley (1993)
- Antena 3 Noticias (1993-2003)

== Awards ==
- TP de Oro (1972): Best presenter
- Antena de Oro (1972, 2003)
- Premios Ondas (1974)
- Premio honorífico Toda una Vida of Academia de Televisión (2007)
- Premio entrañable (2008)
- Gold Medal of Merit in Labour (2010)
- Premio Exxpopress Honorífico (2013)
