= Concepción Cascajosa =

Spanish lecturer on television studies

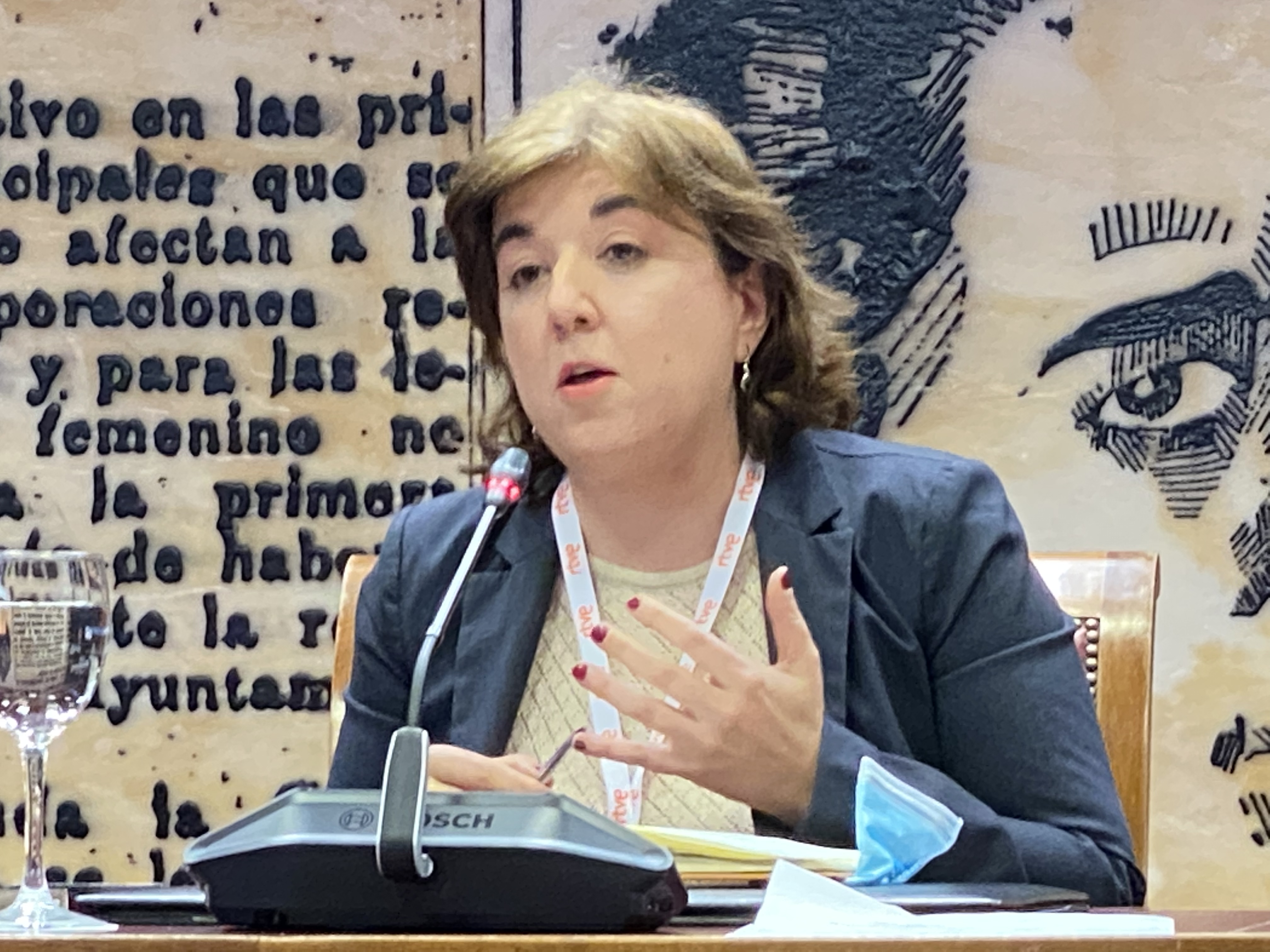

Acting Chair of RTVE
- In office 27 March 2024 – 2 December 2024
- Preceded by: Elena Sánchez Caballero
- Succeeded by: José Pablo López

Personal details
- Born: Concepción Carmen Cascajosa Virino; 1979 (age 46–47) L'Hospitalet de Llobregat (Barcelona), Spain
- Occupation: Lecturer

Concepción Carmen Cascajosa Virino (born 1979) is a Spanish lecturer, working at the Charles III University of Madrid (UC3M). Her main research line is the history of audiovisual media. She has been noted as one of the foremost specialists on television series in Spain. From 2021 to 2024 she served as member of the RTVE governing board, and, from March to December 2024, she served as acting chair of RTVE.

== Biography ==
Born in 1979 in L'Hospitalet de Llobregat, Barcelona to Andalusian parents, she moved in 1984 together with her family to Casariche (Seville), where she was raised. Cascajosa earned a licentiate degree and later a PhD in Audiovisual Communication from the University of Seville. She entered the Charles III University of Madrid (UC3M) in 2006, working with Manuel Palacio. She became senior lecturer at the UC3M in 2012. In 2018, she was proposed as member of the RTVE governing board, endorsed by the PSOE. However, the parliamentary negotiations to renew the RTVE administration fell apart after she was voted by the Congress of Deputies.

Proposed again by the PSOE as candidate to the 10-member RTVE board in 2021, Cascajosa's appointment was passed by the Senate on 24 March 2021, together with the other 3 members of the shortlist to be voted by the Upper House. She assumed on 26 March 2021 together with the rest of the incoming board. In March 2024, the RTVE governing board voted her as the new acting president of RTVE, replacing Elena Sánchez.

== Works ==
Author

- — (2005). Prime time: Las mejores series americanas. Madrid: Calamar.
- — (2006). El espejo deformado. Versiones, secuelas y adaptaciones en Hollywood. Seville: Servicio de Publicaciones de la Universidad de Sevilla.
- — (2006). De la TV a Hollywood. Un repaso a las películas basadas en series. Madrid: Arkadín Ediciones.
- — (2016). La cultura de las series. Barcelona: Editorial Laertes.

Co-author

- Cascajosa Virino, Concepción; Zahedi, Farshad (2016). Historia de la televisión. Valencia: Tirant Humanidades.

Editor

- Cascajosa Virino, Concepción, ed. (2007). La caja lista: televisión norteamericana de culto. Barcelona: Laertes.
- Cascajosa Virino, Concepción, ed. (2015). A New Gaze : Women Creators of Film and Television in Democratic Spain. Newcastle upon Tyne: Cambridge Scholars Publishing.
- Cascajosa, Concepción, ed. (2015). Dentro de "El Ministerio del Tiempo". Madrid: Léeme Libros.
