= Adolfo Suárez Illana =

Spanish politician (born 1964)

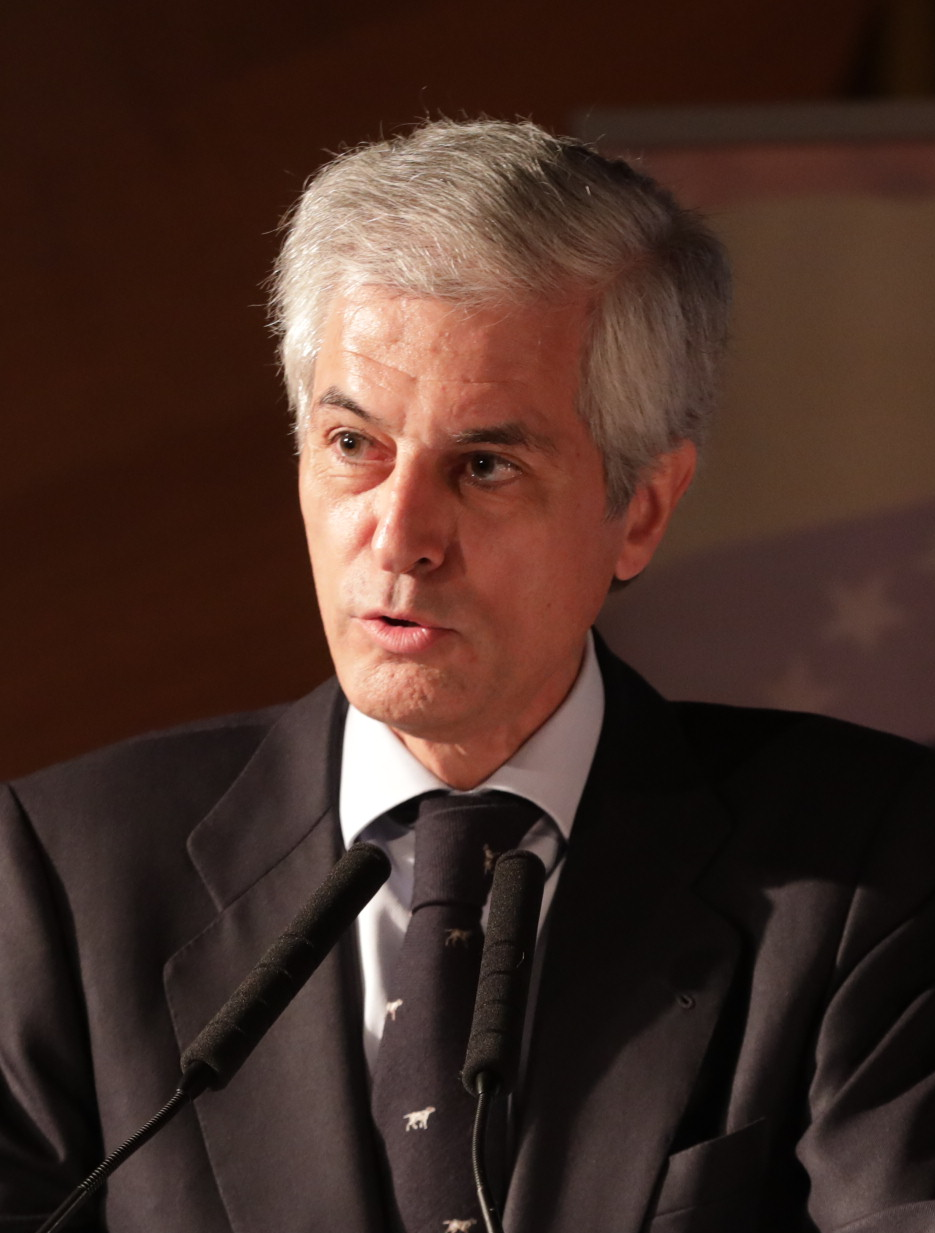

Member of the Congress of Deputies
- In office 21 May 2019 – 13 December 2022
- Succeeded by: Miguel Ángel Quintanilla Navarro
- Constituency: Madrid

Personal details
- Born: 5 May 1964 (age 62) Madrid, Spain
- Party: People's Party
- Spouse: Isabel Flores Santos-Suárez (m. 1998)
- Children: 2
- Parent(s): Adolfo Suárez González; María Amparo Illana Elórtegui
- Education: University CEU San Pablo; Harvard University
- Occupation: Politician, lawyer, author, bullfighter

Adolfo Suárez Illana (born 5 May 1964) is a Spanish politician, lawyer, author and aficionado-practitioner of bullfighting.

== Biography ==
He is the eldest son of the late Adolfo Suárez González, Prime Minister from 1976 and 1981 and central figure of the Spanish Transition.

He studied at the University CEU San Pablo in Madrid and then Harvard in the United States.

In 1990 he published his first collection of poetry titled Sueños. He worked at the Banco Popular from 1990 to 1993.

In 1998 he founded the Madrid law firm "Suárez & Illana S.L." and on 18 July 1998 he married Isabel Flores Santos-Suárez, daughter of the famous breeder of Spanish fighting bulls, Samuel Flores López-Flores and his wife Isabel Santos-Suárez Barroso. The couple have two sons, Adolfo and Pablo.

In 2002 he was chosen by José María Aznar as the People's Party (PP) candidate for the post of Premier of the Autonomous Community of Castile-La Mancha, but lost against the incumbent José Bono, of the Spanish Socialist Workers' Party (PSOE).

Shortly after his father's death in 2014, it was reported that in 2009 Adolfo Suárez Illana had unsuccessfully asked King Juan Carlos I to make him heir to the title of Duke of Suárez, which, by the law of succession to noble titles as amended in 2006, was then due to be inherited by his niece Alejandra Suárez Romero, daughter of Mariam Suárez Illana, the eldest child of Adolfo Suárez González. Although he claimed he had little or no interest in the title himself, he had depositions from five witnesses stating that this was his father's repeatedly stated wish until Alzheimer's disease made him unable to express his wishes.

== Positions ==
Suárez espouses anti-abortion views. He did not submit to the vote discipline of the PP's parliamentary group in the scope of historical memory (abstention), aligning instead with Vox (against) in the voting of the non-legislative proposal for the removal of decorations of Francoist torturer Billy el Niño (June 2020) and again against the removal of honours for dictator Francisco Franco (September 2020).

Political offices
Preceded by Marcelo Expósito	3rd Secretary of the Bureau of the Congress of Deputies; Since 2019	Succeeded by Incumbent
