= José Pablo López =

Spanish journalist (born 1977)

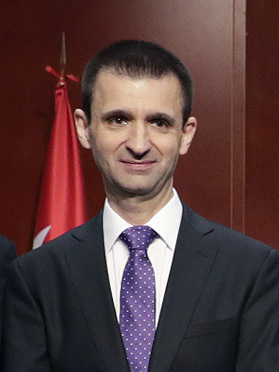
- López in 2017

Chair of RTVE
- Incumbent
- Assumed office 2 December 2024
- Preceded by: Concepción Cascajosa

Personal details
- Born: José Pablo López Sánchez; 15 May 1977 (age 49) Sayalonga (Málaga), Spain

José Pablo López Sánchez (born 15 May 1977) is a Spanish media executive. He has served as Chair of RTVE since 2 December 2024. Previously, he was content manager of RTVE from 2022 to 2024 and director-general of Radio Televisión Madrid (RTVM), the Madrid's regional public broadcasting network, from 2017 to 2021.

== Biography ==
Born in Sayalonga, province of Málaga, on 15 May 1977, López earned a licentiate degree in journalism from the Universidad CEU San Pablo and a licentiate degree in law from the Complutense University of Madrid. He worked and in La Sexta's legal department (2005–2010) and as Director-General of 13TV (2010–2016). Elected as prospective director-general of RTVM out of a shortlist of 36 candidates, his election was ratified in the Assembly of Madrid on 12 January 2017 with 99 votes in favour and 26 abstentions. The votes in favour came from the parliamentary groups of the PP, PSOE and Ciudadanos, whereas Podemos abstained, criticising the lack of "transparency" during the process. He thus took office on 22 February 2017. In July 2020, he assumed as president of FORTA, the federation of Spanish regional public broadcasting networks.

At the end of 2024, the Congress of Deputies appointed him as board member and chair of RTVE.
