= Diari de Tarragona =

- Type: Daily newspaper
- Founded: 17 February 1939
- Language: Spanish language, Catalan
- Headquarters: Tarragona
- Website: diaridetarragona.com

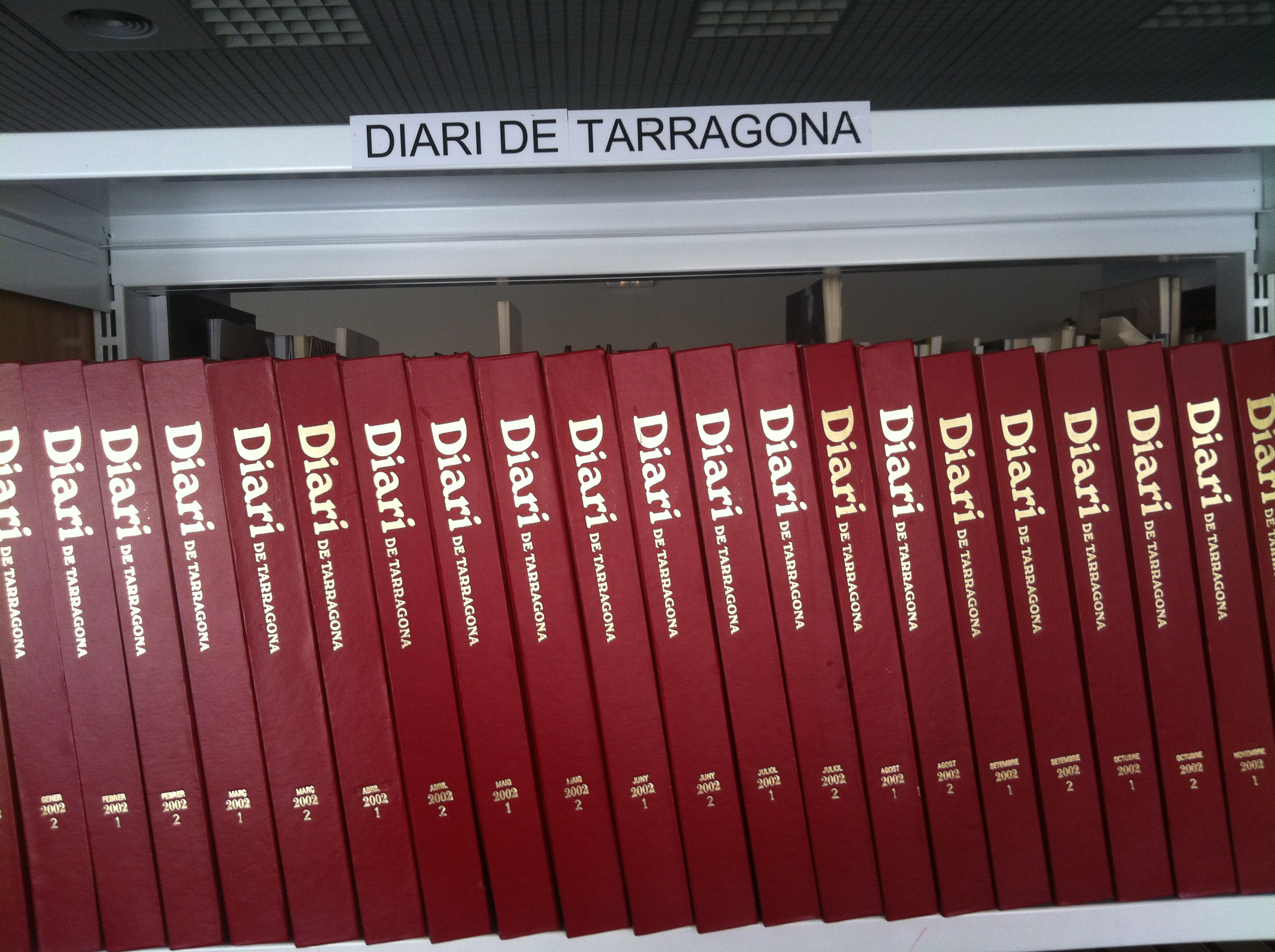

Diari de Tarragona is a Spanish language newspaper, with some articles in Catalan. Based in the province of Tarragona, they are focused on proving the area with local and provincial news. They were originally founded in 1939 with the name Diario Español only a few weeks before the end of the Spanish Civil War.

== History ==
The newspaper published its first issue on 17 January 1939, in the middle of the Civil War, shortly after Tarragona was occupied by the Franquistas. Their first director was Luis Climent, who held the position from 1939 to 1942.

During the Dictatorship, the newspaper formed part of the Cadena de Prensa del Movimiento. After Franco's death, they joined the public body Medios de Comunicación Social del Estado (MCSE). In 1984, they were auctioned off by the State and sold. Following this, they changed their name to Diari de Tarragona.

== Bibliography ==
- Altabella, José (1966). «El Norte de Castilla» en su marco periodístico (1854-1965). Editora Nacional.
- Bonamusa, Francesc (1997). Política i finances republicanes (1931-1939). Edicions El Mèdol.
- De las Heras Pedrosa, José Antonio (2000). La prensa del movimiento y su gestión publicitaria, 1936-1984 (PDF). Universidad de Málaga.
- Greciet, Esteban (1998). Censura tras la censura. Crónica personal de la transición periodística. Fragua.
- Montabes Pereira, Juan (1989). La prensa del Estado durante la transición política española. Madrid: CSIC.
- Navarra Ordoño, Andreu (2013). La región sospechosa. La dialéctica hispanocatalana entre 1875 y 1939. Universidad Autónoma de Barcelona. ISBN 978-84-490-2984-4.
- Sánchez Rada, Juan (1996). Prensa, del movimiento al socialismo: 60 años de dirigismo informático. Fragua.
- Sevillano Calero, Francisco (1998). Propaganda y medios de comunicación en el franquismo (1936-1951). Universidad de Alicante.
