= 2015 in Spanish television =

This is a list of Spanish television related events from 2015.

== Events ==
- 25 January – 25 anniversary of the first private TV Channel in Spain, Antena 3.
- 25 February: José Creuheras Margenat is appointed Chairman of Atresmedia Corporación.
- 3 March – 25 anniversary of Telecinco.
- 31 March – Change in the system of Digital terrestrial television broadcasting due to the so-called Digital dividend after digital television transition.
- 30 June – TV channel GOL PLAY launches.
- 8 July – Digital platform Movistar+ is launched
- 15 July – TV Channel Mega starts broadcasting.
- 20 October – Netflix is launched in Spain.
- 22 December – TV Channel Atreseries is launched.

== Debuts ==
Title	Channel	Debut	Performers/Host	Genre
Hit-La canción	La 1	2015-01-02	Jaime Cantizano	Talent Show
Algo que celebrar	Antena 3	2015-01-07	Luis Varela and Elena Irureta	Sitcom
Las aventuras del capitán Alatriste	Telecinco	2015-01-07	Aitor Luna	Drama Series
Víctor Ros	La 1	2015-01-12	Carles Francino	Drama Series
En tierra hostil	Antena 3	2015-01-13	Jalís de la Serna and Alejandra Andrade	Docureality
El legado	La 1	2015-01-19	Ramón García	Game Show
Diario de un nómada	La 2	2015-01-25	Miquel Silvestre	Travel
Los Gypsy Kings	Cuatro	2015-02-08	Los Chunguitos	Docudrama
Levántate	Telecinco	2015-02-10	Jesús Vázquez	Talent Show
Bajo sospecha	Antena 3	2015-02-17	Yon González and Blanca Romero	Drama Series
José mota presenta...	La 1	2015-02-20	José Mota	Comedy
Alaska y Segura	La 1	2015-02-23	Olvido Gara and Santiago Segura	Late Night
El ministerio del tiempo	La 1	2015-02-24	Rodolfo Sancho and Aura Garrido	Drama Series
Guasabi	Cuatro	2015-02-27	Eva Hache	Videos
Generación web	La 2	2015-03-01		Science/Culture
Casados a primera vista	Antena 3	2015-03-02	Marián Frías and Arantxa Coca Vila	Docureality
Los nuestros	Telecinco	2015-03-02	Blanca Suárez and Hugo Silva	Miniseries
Sopa de gansos	Cuatro	2015-03-18	Florentino Fernández and Dani Martínez	Comedy
La alfombra roja palace	La 1	2015-03-21	Berta Collado and Jota Abril	Variety Show
Aquí Paz y después Gloria	Telecinco	2015-03-24	Antonio Resines	Sitcom
El precio de los alimentos	La Sexta	2015-03-29	Alberto Chicote	Investigation
Las mil y una noches	Telecinco	2015-04-01	Paz Vega	Miniseries
Allí abajo	Antena 3	2015-04-07	María León and Jon Plazaola	Sitcom
Al punto	La 1	2015-04-12	Elena Sánchez	Cooking Show
El último mono	La Sexta	2015-04-12	Manu Sánchez	Comedy
Acacias 38	La 1	2015-04-15	Ana del Rey	Soap Opera
Locked Up	Antena 3	2015-04-20	Maggie Civantos	Drama Series
Seis Hermanas	La 1	2015-04-22	María Castro	Soap Opera
Fronteras al límite	La 1	2015-05-06		Docureality
The Refugees	Antena 3	2015-05-07	Natalia Tena.	Drama Series
Historia de nuestro cine	La 2	2015-05-11	Elena S. Sánchez	Movies
Al rincón de pensar	Antena 3	2015-05-19	Risto Mejide	Talk Show
Así de claro	La 1	2015-05-25	Ernesto Sáenz de Buruaga	Talk Show
Anclados	Telecinco	2015-05-25	Miren Ibarguren and Joaquín Reyes	Sitcom
Jugamos en casa	La 1	2015-06-08	Los Morancos	Game Show
Seguridad vital	La 1	2015-06-13	Marta Solano and Carlos García Hirschfeld	Public Service
Cámbiame	Telecinco	2015-06-15	Marta Torné	Reality Show
Retorno a Lilifor	Neox	2015-06-29	Ernesto Sevilla	Comedy
¡Vaya fauna!	Telecinco	2015-07-01	Christian Gálvez	Talent Show
Insuperables	La 1	2015-07-06	Carolina Cerezuela	Talent Show
Cocineros al volante	La 1	2015-07-07	Paula Prendes	Cooking Show
Volando voy	Cuatro	2015-07-19	Jesús Calleja	Documentary
Pasaporte a la isla	Telecinco	2015-07-19	Jordi González	Reality Show
TVEmos	La 1	2015-07-20	Elisa Mouliaá	videos
La dama velada	Telecinco	2015-07-26	Úrsula Corberó	Drama Series
Costa España	La 1	2015-07-27	Mario Picazo	Documentary
Estadio 1	La 1	2015-08-25	Juan Carlos Rivero	Sport
La bella y la bestia	Telecinco	2015-08-27	Blanca Suárez	Miniseries
Cámbiame Premium	Telecinco	2015-09-01	Jorge Javier Vázquez	Reality Show
Carlos, rey emperador	La 1	2015-09-07	Álvaro Cervantes and Blanca Suárez	Drama Series
Torres en la cocina	La 1	2015-09-07	Hermanos Torres.	Cooking Show
Olmos y Robles	La 1	2015-09-08	Pepe Viyuela and Rubén Cortada	Sitcom
En la tuya o en la mí	La 1	2015-09-09	Bertín Osborne	Talk Show
Pecadores	Cuatro	2015-09-16	Mónica Martínez.	Reality Show
Mi familia en la mochila	La 2	2015-09-20		Travel
Yo, mono	La 2	2015-09-20	Pablo Herreros	Science/Culture
Mar de plástico	Antena 3	2015-09-22	Jesús Castro	Drama Series
Cámbiame de noche	Telecinco	2015-09-23	Marta Torne	Reality Show
Rabia	Cuatro	2015-09-28	Carles Francino and Patricia Vico	Drama Series
La escuela de decoración	La Sexta	2015-10-03		Variety Show
Libros con uasabi	La 2	2015-10-04	Fernando Sánchez Dragó	Science/Culture
80 cm	La 2	2015-10-17	Edu Soto	Travel
Esto es vida	La 1	2015-10-26	Cristina Lasvignes	Science/Culture
Centro Médico	La 1	2015-10-26	Natalia Romero and Diego Herranz	Docudrama
Habitaciones cerradas	La 1	2015-11-03	Álex García and Adriana Ugarte	Miniseries
Yo Quisiera	Divinity	2015-11-09	Lucía Gil	Youth
La española inglesa	La 1	2015-11-10	Macarena García	TV-Movie
Constructor a la fuga	La Sexta	2015-11-10	Antonio Hernández	Docureality
Teresa	La 1	2015-11-17	Marian Álvarez	TV-Movie
El clavo de oro	La 1	2015-11-24		TV-Movie
Comandancias	La Sexta	2015-12-03		Docureality
Ciencia forense	La 2	2015-12-20		Docureality
¿Y tú qué sabes?	LaSexta	2015-12-27	Óscar Terol	Game Show

== Television shows ==
- La 1
  - Telediario (1957– )
  - Informe Semanal (1973– )
  - Telepasión española (1990– )
  - Los Desayunos de TVE (1994–2020)
  - Cine de barrio (1995– )
  - Corazón (1997– )
  - Cuéntame cómo pasó (2001– )
  - España Directo (2005–2022)
  - Comando actualidad (2008– )
  - Españoles en el mundo (2009 – )
  - Águila Roja (2009–2016)
  - La Mañana de La 1 (2009–2020)
  - Audiencia abierta (2012– )
  - Flash Moda (2012– )
  - El Debate de la 1 (2012–2017)
  - MasterChef (2013– )
  - MasterChef Junior (2013– )
  - Viaje al centro de la tele (2013– )
  - Aquí la Tierra (2014– )
  - Amigas y conocidas (2014–2018)
  - Ochéntame otra vez (2014–2021)
- Telecinco
  - Informativos Telecinco (1990– )
  - Survivor Spain (2000– )
  - Big Brother Spain (2000–2017)
  - Gran Hermano VIP (2004–2019)
  - El Programa de Ana Rosa (2005– )
  - Pasapalabra (2007–2019)
  - Survivor Spain (2006– )
  - La que se avecina (2007– )
  - Pasapalabra (2007–2019)
  - Mujeres y Hombres y Viceversa (2008–2018)
  - Sálvame (2009– )
  - Deluxe (2009– )
  - ¡Qué tiempo tan feliz! (2009–2017)
  - La Voz (2012–2017)
  - B&b, de boca en boca (2014–2016)
  - Chiringuito de Pepe (2014–2016)
  - Hable con ellas (2014–2016)
  - El Príncipe (2014–2016)
  - La Voz Kids (2014–2018)
- La 2
  - Al filo de lo imposble (1982– )
  - Pueblo de Dios (1982– )
  - Últimas preguntas (1983– )
  - En portada (1984– )
  - Metrópolis (1985– )
  - Documentos TV (1986– )
  - Tendido cero (1986– )
  - Días de cine (1991– )
  - La Aventura del saber (1992– )
  - Jara y sedal (1992– )
  - La 2 noticias (1994–2020)
  - La noche temática, (1995– )
  - Agrosfera (1997– )
  - El escarabajo verde (1997– )
  - Saber y ganar (1997– )
  - El Cine de La 2 (1998– )
  - Versión española (1998– )
  - Aquí hay trabajo (2000– )
  - España en comunidad (2000–2020)
  - Shalom (2003– )
  - Cámara abierta 2.0 (2007– )
  - Página 2 (2007– )
  - En lengua de signos (2008– )
  - Zoom tendencias ( 2008– )
  - Fábrica de ideas (2008–2017)
  - RTVE responde (2009– )
  - Imprescindibles (2010– )
  - Para todos la Dos (2010– )
  - Mitad invisible, La (2010–2016)
  - Cómo nos reímos (2012– )
  - ¡Atención obras! (2013– )
  - Cachitos de hierro y cromo (2013– )
  - Órbita Laika (2014–)
  - Millenium (2014–2019)
- Antena 3
  - Antena 3 Noticias (1990– )
  - Espejo público (1996– )
  - La ruleta de la fortuna (2006– )
  - Karlos Arguiñano en tu cocina (2010– )
  - Tu cara me suena (2011– )
  - El Hormiguero (2011– )
  - El secreto de Puente Viejo (2011–2020)
  - ¡Ahora caigo! (2011–2021)
  - Centímetros cúblicos (2012– )
  - Amar es para siempre22 (2013– )
  - Me resbala (2013–2021)
  - Top Chef (2013–2017)
  - ¡Boom! (2014–2022)
  - Velvet (2014–2016)
- La Sexta
  - El Intermedio (2006– )
  - La Sexta Noticias (2006– )
  - Salvados (2008– )
  - Al rojo vivo (2011– )
  - La Sexta columna (2012– )
  - Más vale tarde (2012– )
  - Pesadilla en la cocina (2012–2020)
  - Equipo de investigación (2013– )
  - Jugones (2013– )
  - El objetivo (2013–2022)
  - Zapeando (2013– )
  - Policías en acción (2013–2016)
  - La Sexta noche (2013–2022)
  - El jefe infiltrado (2014– )
- Cuatro
  - Cuarto milenio (2005– )
  - Noticias Cuatro (2005–2019)
  - Supernanny (2006–2017)
  - Las mañanas de Cuatro (2006–2018)
  - 21 días (2009–2016)
  - Hermano mayor (2009–2017)
  - Granjero busca esposa (2009–2018)
  - Conexión Samanta (2010–2016)
  - ¿Quién quiere casarse con mi hijo? (2012–2017)
  - Planeta Calleja (2014– )
  - Gym Tony (2014–2016)
  - Chester (2014– )

== Ending this year ==
- La 1
  - Cocina con Sergio (2012–2015)
  - Fabricando: Made in Spain (2013–2015)
  - Cocina2 (2014–2015)
- La 2
  - Música ligerísima (2014–2015)
- Antena 3
  - Sin identidad (2014–2015)
- Cuatro
  - Adán y Eva (2014–2015)
  - La otra red (2014–2015)
  - Todo va bien (2014–2015)
  - Un tiempo nuevo (2014–2015)
- Telecinco
  - I love TV (2008–2015)
  - Hay una cosa que te quiero decir (2012–2015)
  - Amores que duelen (2014–2015)
  - Pequeños gigantes (2014–2015)
  - Robin Food: atracón a mano armada (2014–2015)

== Changes of network affiliation ==
Show	Moved From	Moved To
Pekín Express (2008–2017)	Cuatro	Antena 3
El chiringuito de Jugones (2014–)	Neox	Mega
Un tiempo nuevo (2014–2015)	Telecinco	Cuatro

== Deaths ==
- 13 January – José Luis Moro, cartoonist, 88.
- 29 January – Amparo Baró, actress, 77.
- 31 January – José Manuel Lara Bosch, CEO of Atresmedia, 68.
- 11 February – Ricardo Palacios, actor, 74.
- 7 March – Santi Trancho, cameraman, 31.
- 17 March – Juan Claudio Cifuentes «Cifu», host, 73.
- 21 March – Moncho Alpuente, journalist, 65.
- 25 March – Pedro Reyes, comedian, 53.
- 29 March – Matilde Conesa, voice actress, 86.
- 4 April – María Pineda, model, 54.
- 4 May – Jesús Hermida, journalist, 77.
- 7 May
  - Aitor Mazo, actor, 53.
  - Luis Calvo Teixeira, director and writer, 79.
- 23 June – Marujita Díaz, actress, singer and TV pundit, 83.
- 23 July – José Sazatornil, actor, 90.
- 25 July – Juan Roldán, journalist, 73.
- 20 August – Lina Morgan, actress, 78.
- 5 October – Ana Diosdado, actress and writer, 77.
- 25 November – María del Puy, actress, 74.

== See also ==
- 2015 in Spain
