= Celia Freijeiro =

Spanish actress

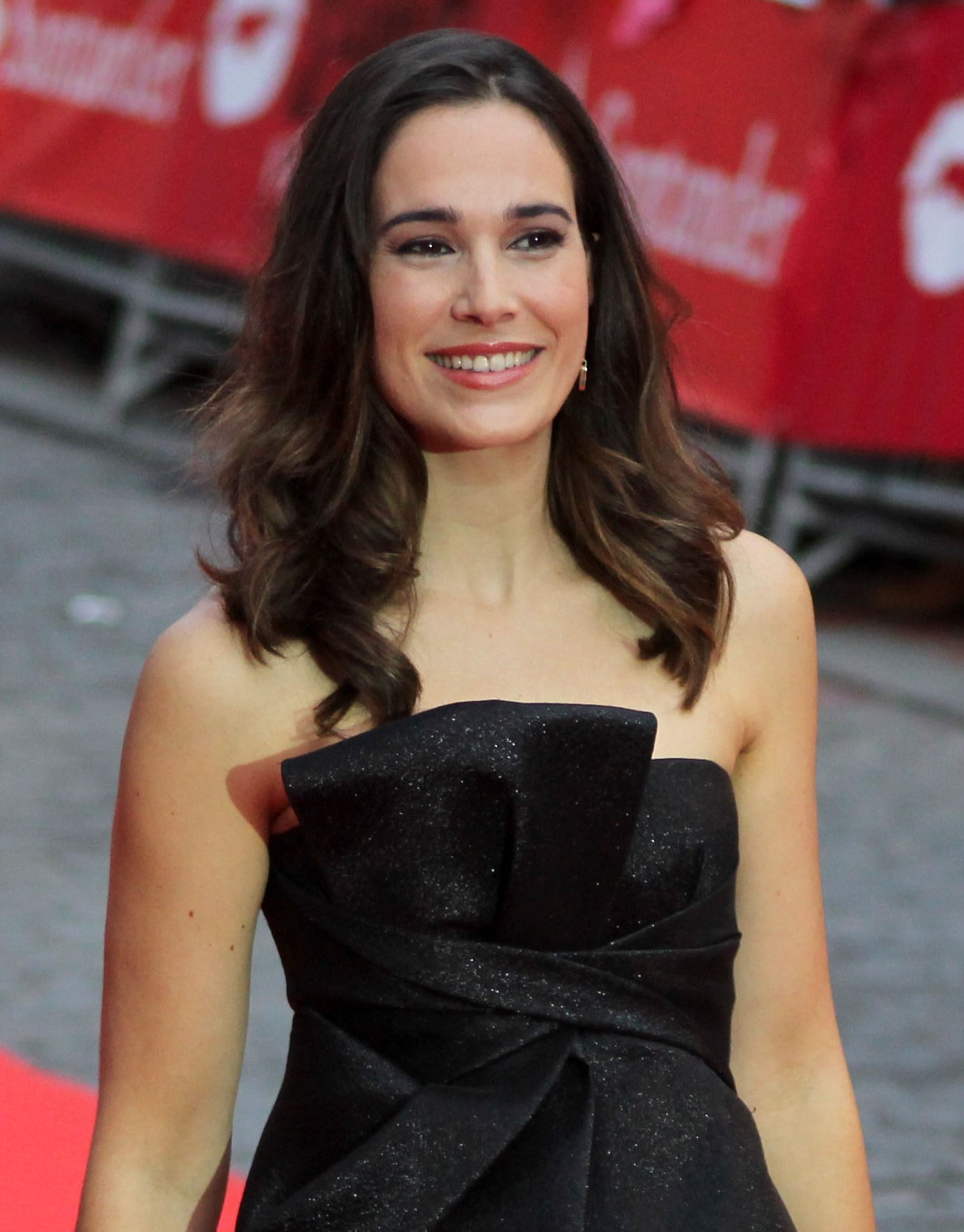
- Freijeiro at the Seminci Film Festival 2015
- Born: Celia Freijeiro García; 9 February 1983 (age 43); Vigo, Spain
- Occupation: Actress
- Years active: 2005-present

Celia Freijeiro García (Vigo, February 9, 1983) is a Spanish film, theater and television actress and producer.

== Biography ==
She was born in Vigo, Galicia, in a family with an artistic vocation: her father, Rafael Freijeiro, is a Galician painter. After graduating from DeWitt High School in Arkansas (United States), she moved to Madrid where she began her training and career as an actress.

She made the leap to professional theater with Paloma Pedrero's play El color de agosto which she starred in and produced herself. For her performance in this text she was nominated for two of the most important theater awards in Spain: the Valle Inclán Theater Awards and the Mayte Award. Since then she has participated in numerous theatrical productions, television series and films.

In 2006, at the age of 23, she created Desnudo Azul, a cultural association that in 2008 will become his own production company, PocaPena Productions. To date, with Pocapena she has produced numerous plays, several short films and a feature film.

In 2010 she became a member of the board of the Sociedad Cervantina (Calle Atocha 87, Madrid) and in 2017 she became its vice-president. Thanks to social networks, in February 2017, we were able to learn that construction work was beginning on her own theater, the Cervantes Chamber Theater, located in the Cervantina Society, which opened its doors in 2019.

== Professional career ==
She has been in charge of conducting six times the Gala of the Valle Inclán Theater Awards at the Teatro Real (Madrid), being in 2014 nominated for the award for her performance in the play Los Cenci by Antonin Artaud at the Teatro Español.

She has been a member of the critics and jury of numerous film and theater contests and festivals with a long history in Spain, during several of its editions.

She participated in the 28th and 29th editions of the Spanish Film Gala, presenting the Goya Award for Best Special Effects.

In December 2012 she was shortlisted for Best Leading Actress at the 2013 Goya Awards for her performance in the film Todo es silencio by José Luis Cuerda.

In November 2015 she was shortlisted again for the 2016 Goya Awards for her performance in two feature films in 2015. Best Leading Actress for De chica en chica by Sonia Sebastián and Best Supporting Actress for La playa de los ahogados by Gerardo Herrero.

With her performance as Adela Silva in the series Seis hermanas (2015-2017) she achieved considerable acclaim, both in Spain and Latin America. At the beginning of 2018 her inclusion was announced to the episodes of the second season of the series Servir y proteger of TVE, beginning to be broadcast in February. At the same time, news came that the actress would be part of the cast of the new series of Boomerang TV for La 1, La Otra Mirada vindictive, feminist fiction and starring mostly women, starting on April 25. The actress participated in November 2018 in Gigante 3, experimental theater festival of contemporary classics, organized by the Cervantine Society, appearing in the play Sangre Forzada, within the show Herejes. By the end of the year it was known that Celia would star in the new series of Leticia Dolera, Vida Perfecta, to be broadcast on Movistar Plus. The first chapter of this series will premiere in April this year, during the Cannes Film Festival 2019, where it competes in the Official CanneSeries Section as Vida Perfecta.

=== Theater ===
Year	Play	Character	Written by	Directed by
2020	Taxi Girl	Anaïs Nin	María Velasco	Javier Giner
2019	La corte del rey faraón	Lota	Festival de Mérida	
2019	Marcela	Marcela	Julia de Castro	Javier Giner
2018	Sangre forzada	Leocadia	María Folguera	Javier Giner
2015	La gitanilla		Miguel de Cervantes	Sonia Sebastián
2014	Amazing future III, Memory cloud		Cristina Pons Ángel Turlan	Sonia Sebastián
2013-2015	Mucho ruido y pocas nueces		William Shakespeare	Sonia Sebastián
2013	Los celos			Sonia Sebastián
2013	Los Cenci	Beatriz Cenci	Antonin Artaud	Sonia Sebastián
2012	Metro 13		Kike Maillo	Kike Maillo
2011	Sopa de colibrí		Ariel Capone	Sonia Sebastián
2010	El poder de la sangre			Sonia Sebastián
2010	El imaginario de Cervantes			Sonia Sebastián
2008	La Música		Marguerite Duras	Marta Álvarez
2007	El león en invierno		James Goldman	Juan Carlos Pérez de la Fuente
2007	El dulce peso de la decadencia		Antonio Garrigues Walker	Juan Carlos Pérez de la Fuente
2006	El color de agosto		Paloma Pedrero	Marta Álvarez
2003-2004	Noches de monólogos		Adan Black	Adan Black
2003	Proceso por la sombra de un burro		Friedrich Dürrenmatt	
2002	Noches de amor efímero		Paloma Pedrero	
2002	El perro del hortelano		Lope de Vega	

=== Television ===
==== Television series ====
Year	Title	Character	Cadena	Duration
2005	Maridos e mulleres		TVG	
2005	El comisario	Alejandra	Telecinco	3 episodes
2006	Amistades peligrosas	Silvia Marcos	Cuatro	45 episodes
2007	Hospital Central	Cati	Telecinco	1 episode
2007	Hay que vivir: El jugador	Alicia	La 1	1 episode
2008	2 de mayo, la libertad de una nación	Pepita García	La 1	17 episodes
2008	Pelotas	Nieves Sáez	La 1	13 episodes
2011	Homicidios	Eva Hernández	Telecinco	13 episodes
2015	Bajo sospecha	Silvia López	Antena 3	2 episodes
2015 - 2017	Seis hermanas	Adela Silva	La 1	368 episodes
2018	Servir y proteger	Teresa Ronda Montiel	La 1	89 episodes
2019; 2021	Vida perfecta	Cristina "Cris"	Movistar+	15 episodes
2021	Historias para no dormir	Journalist	Prime Video	1 episode

==== Web series ====
Year	Title	Character
2007	Chica busca chica	Nines

=== Short films ===
Year	Title	Character	Directed by
2016	Actors		Elisabeth Larena
2012	Papá se ha ido		Sonia Sebastián
2012	Teaser La llama del triunfo de José María García-Lujan		Sonia Sebastián
2009	Woman on the falls		Sonia Sebastián
2009	Dos mujeres, un pájaro y una triste historia de amor	Martina	Sonia Sebastián
2007	Las piezas del puzzle		Daniel Ramírez
2004	El pelele		Jesús Prieto
1999	Cuervos		Instituto de Imagen y Sonido de Vigo

=== Cinema ===
Year	Title	Character	Directed by	Role
2023	Honeymoon with My Mother	Teresa	Paco Caballero	
2015	La playa de los ahogados	Ana	Gerardo Herrero	Secondary
2015	De chica en chica	Inés	Sonia Sebastián	Starring
2012	Todo es silencio	Leda	José Luis Cuerda	Starring
2011	Ángel Llorca: El último ensayo		Víctor M. Guerra	Narrator
2006	Días azules	Genoveva	Miguel Santesmases	Starring
2005	Los aires difíciles	Elena	Gerardo Herrero	Secondary

== Awards and nominations ==
Year	Award	Category	Nominated work	Result
2014	Valle Inclán Theater Awards	Best actress in theater	Los Cenci	Finalist
2013	Mestre Mateo Award	Best Female Performer Starring	Todo es silencio	Nominated
2012	Zapping Awards	Best television actress	Homicidios	Nominated
2010	Media Club Gold Star Award	Best television actress	Pelotas	Won
2006	Valle Inclán Theater Awards	Best actress in theater	El color de agosto	Nominated

Throughout her more than 10 years of career she has been shortlisted for numerous prestigious awards such as the Goya Awards, Actors Union Awards and Mestre Mateo Awards:

2017

- Shortlisted for the Actors Union Awards for Best Actress in a Leading Role (Television) for Seis hermanas for Televisión Española.

2016

- Shortlisted for the Mestre Mateo Award for Best Female Supporting Actress for La playa de los ahogados by Gerardo Herrero.
- Triple shortlisted for the Actors Union Awards for Best Supporting Actress (Film) for La playa de los ahogados by Gerardo Herrero, Best Leading Actress (Television) for Seis hermanas by Televisión Española and Best New Actress (Film) for De chica en chica by Sonia Sebastián.

2015

- Doubly shortlisted for the 2016 Goya Awards for Best Supporting Actress for Gerardo Herrero's La playa de los ahogados and Best Leading Actress for Sonia Sebastian's De chica en chica.

2013

- Shortlisted for the Actors Union Awards for Best Actress in a Motion Picture for Todo es silencio by José Luis Cuerda.

2012

- Shortlisted for the 2013 Goya Awards for Best Actress in a Leading Role for Todo es silencio by José Luis Cuerda.

== Awards Ceremony ==
2018

- Jury in the XV edition of the Buero Young Theater Award for the Coca-Cola Foundation.
- In charge of conducting the gala of the Valle Inclán Theater Awards at the Teatro Real (Madrid).

2017

- IV edition of the Platino Awards: she presents the Platinum Award for Best Staging Direction to Bernat Vinaplana and Jaume Martí, for Un monstruo viene a verme.
- In charge of awarding the Third Prize, in the school category, in the 14th edition of the Buero Youth Theater Award.
- Jury in the IX Short Film Contest of Radio Nacional de España.
- Jury in the XIV edition of the Buero Youth Theater Award for the Coca-Cola Foundation.
- In charge of conducting the gala of the Valle Inclán Theater Awards at the Teatro Real (Madrid).

2016

- Jury in the XIII edition of the Buero Young Theater Award for the Coca-Cola Foundation.
- Jury in the XVI Lanzarote International Film Festival, in the International Fiction Short Film section, also awarding the prize to the winner in this category.
- In charge of conducting the gala of the Valle Inclán Theater Awards at the Teatro Real (Madrid).
- In charge of presenting the San Pancracio Revelation Actor Award to Miguel Herrán at the XXIII Festival Solidario de Cine Español de Cáceres (Cáceres, Spain).
- At the XI edition of the Lienzo de Picasso Awards, she presents the award for Best Actor in a Dramatic Series together with Marta Larralde.

2015

- Presenter of the VII Yo Dona Beauty Awards.
- Presenter of the Audience Award for Best Documentary and the Audience Award for Best Feature Film at the closing gala of the 20th Andalesgai Film Festival.
- Jury of the Cuida de ti de Mía Awards
- Jury in the XII edition of the Buero Young Theater Award for the Coca-Cola Foundation.
- In charge of conducting the gala of the Valle Inclán Theater Awards at the Teatro Real (Madrid).
- XXIX edition of the Goya Awards: in charge of presenting the Goya for Best Special Effects to El niño together with Hiba Abouk and Marc Clotet.

2014

- In charge of presenting the Sauce de Oro Award to La Escuela de Teatro Pilar Rey de La Palma at the X Festival de Teatro Amateur Villa de El Sauzal together with Las Grotesqués.
- Jury in the XI edition of the Buero Young Theater Award for the Coca-Cola Foundation.
- Awarded the Alicante Cinema Special Mention at the Alicante Film Festival.
- XXVIII edition of the Goya Awards: in charge of delivering the Goya for Best Special Effects to Las brujas de Zugarramurdi together with Carlos Santos.

2013

- In charge of conducting the Valle Inclán Theater Awards Gala at the Teatro Real (Madrid).

2012

- Jury of the second edition of the Cervantes Short Theater Awards, at the Cervantine Society.
- In charge of conducting the Gala of the Valle Inclán Theater Awards at the Teatro Real (Madrid).

2011

- Presenter of the first edition of the Cervantes Short Theater Awards at the Cervantes Society.
- In charge of conducting the gala of the Valle Inclán Theater Awards at the Teatro Real (Madrid).
- Jury in the V edition of the Digital Festival El Sector, international short film contest in Madrid.

2009

- Short Film Jury at the VII edition of the Cans Festival.

== Projects as a producer ==
Year	Title	Category
2015	La gitanilla	Theater - Cervantes Chamber Theater
2014	De chica en chica	Feature Film - PocaPena Productions
2014	Amazing future III, Memory cloud	Theater - Cervantes Chamber Theater
2013-2015	Mucho ruido y pocas nueces	Theater - Cervantes Chamber Theater
2013	Los celos	Theater - Cervantes Chamber Theater
2012	Papá se ha ido	Short film - PocaPena Productions
2011	Sopa de colibrí	Theater - Cervantes Chamber Theater
2010	El poder de la sangre	Theater - Cervantes Chamber Theater
2010	El imaginario de Cervantes	Theater - Cervantes Chamber Theater
2009	Woman on the falls	Short film - PocaPena Productions
2009	Dos mujeres, un pájaro y una triste historia de amor	Short film - PocaPena Productions
2006	El color de agosto	Theater – Desnudo Azul
