= Boi (film) =

2019 Spanish thriller film

- Film poster
- Directed by: Jorge M. Fontana
- Written by: Jorge M. Fontana
- Starring: Bernat Quintana; Anatoly Chugunov; Miranda Gas; Macarena Gómez
- Distributed by: Netflix
- Release date: March 29, 2019
- Running time: 111 minutes
- Countries: Spain; Portugal; Canada
- Languages: English, Spanish

Boi is a 2019 Spanish thriller film directed and written by Jorge M. Fontana.

== Cast ==
- Bernat Quintana as Boi
- Andrew Lua as Michael
- Adrian Pang as Gordon
- Anatoly Chugunov as Mafioso
- Miranda Gas as Anna
- Macarena Gómez as Dueña Club Privado
- Rachel Lascar as Mme. Tabard
- Pol López as Felipe
- Man Mourentan as Mou
- Jean Claude Ricquebourg as Eduardo
- Fina Rius as Tia Boi

== Release ==
Carlos Aguilar writing for the Los Angeles Times gave the film a bad review, stating: "'Boi', from first-time Spanish writer-director Jorge M. Fontana, aims to examine an individual with unfulfilled artistic aspirations wrapped in a cryptic thriller; however, its stylish features overpower its many attempts at philosophical depth." Helen T. Verongos from the New York Times also disliked the movie, writing: "The tantalizing clues, occasional laughs, and lapses, in reality, are not enough to hold this film together."
