= Marco, the Story of a Boy =

- Promotional image of the main cast from the Antena 3 miniseries Marco, the Story of a Boy.
- Also known as: Marco, the Story of a Boy
- Genre: Drama / Mystery
- Written by: Pau Txorro
- Directed by: Félix Viscarret
- Starring: Mercedes Sampietro; Alicia Hermida; Sergi Méndez; Carla Díaz; Julián Villagrán; Julia de Castro; Meri Rodríguez; Ernesto Alterio; Estefanía de los Santos; Juan and Raúl del Pozo; Álvaro de Luna; Ariadna Gil
- Country of origin: Spain
- Original language: Spanish

Production
- Production company: Bambú Producciones

Original release
- Network: Antena 3
- Release: 26 December 2011 – 2 January 2012

Marco, the Story of a Boy was a Spanish miniseries that adapted the animated series Marco into a modern live-action story. It was directed by Félix Viscarret and starred Sergi Méndez, Juan and Raúl del Pozo, Ernesto Alterio, Carla Díaz, Meri Rodríguez, Mercedes Sampietro, and Álvaro de Luna.

The fiction, produced by Bambú Producciones, is a loose live-action adaptation of the anime of the same name, which had been successfully re-broadcast on various Spanish TV channels during the 1970s, 1980s, and 1990s. The animated version itself was an adaptation of the novel Heart: A Schoolboy's Journal by Italian writer Edmondo de Amicis.

== Plot ==
Marco (Sergi Méndez) and Lucas (Juan and Raúl del Pozo) are two boys living in a small town in Italy. Their mother Ana (Ariadna Gil) must leave the village to provide them with a better life. Marco and Lucas stay with their neighbors Andrés (Álvaro de Luna) and Clara (Mercedes Sampietro) until they decide to go in search of their mother in Argentina. A social worker named Carlos (Ernesto Alterio) goes after them to bring them back. During their journey, Marco and Lucas meet a young thief named Lala (Carla Díaz) who helps them escape. The series narrates Marco’s journey across the sea from Italy to Argentina.

== Cast ==
- Sergi Méndez as Marco Corral Rodríguez; called Pepino in the Latin American version.
- Carla Díaz as Lala, Marco’s girlfriend and Lucas’s friend.
- Juan and Raúl del Pozo as Lucas Corral Rodríguez.
- Mercedes Sampietro as Clara, neighbor who cares for Marco and Lucas.
- Álvaro de Luna as Andrés, neighbor who also cares for them.
- Alicia Hermida as Maricarmen.
- Julián Villagrán as Sandor.
- Julia de Castro as Dalila.
- Ernesto Alterio as Carlos Gómez, the social worker pursuing Marco and Lucas.
- Meri Rodríguez as María.
- Estefanía de los Santos as Juanota.
- Ariadna Gil as Ana Rodríguez Sabín, mother of Marco and Lucas.
- Julián Villagrán as magician on the cruise ship.
- El Sevilla as the beggar.
