= Candela Serrat =

Spanish actress

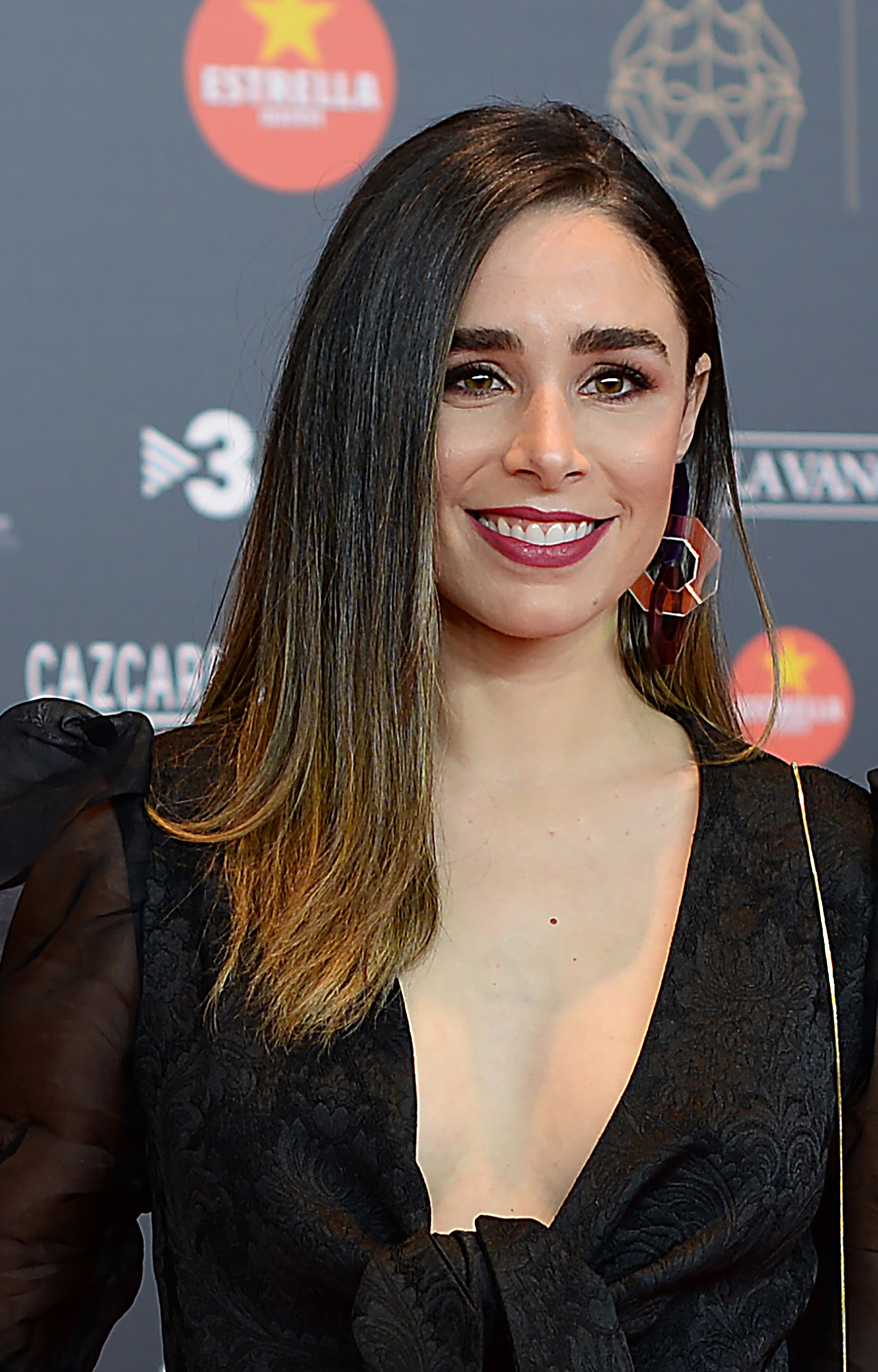
- Candela Serrat in 2020
- Born: Candela Serrat Tiffón; 14 November 1986 (age 39); Barcelona, Spain
- Occupation: Actress
- Years active: 2012-present
- Spouse: Daniel Muriel (m. 2019)
- Father: Joan Manuel Serrat

Candela Serrat Tiffón (born 14 November 1986, in Barcelona, Spain) is a Spanish actress known to the general public for her participation in the Spanish television series Seis hermanas.

== Biography ==
Born in Barcelona in 1986, she is the youngest daughter of singer Joan Manuel Serrat and model Candela Tiffón. She has an older sister, María Serrat, and an older brother on her father's side, Manuel Serrat.

She studied at the LAMDA theater school in London and at the William Layton Laboratory in Madrid.

In 2012 she landed her first television role in the TV3 afternoon series La Riera, playing Alba Comas. Between 2015 and 2017 she starred in the daily series Seis hermanas for TVE, where she played Celia Silva for 486 episodes. In 2018 she returned to the Catalan autonomous channel to participate in the TV-movie Cançó per tu, which starred alongside Nao Albet and Félix Herzog.

Serrat has developed most of her artistic career in the theater working with directors of the stature of Mario Gas, Francisco Vidal and Joan Ollé.

In 2017 she made her first feature film starring in Yerma, an adaptation of the play of the same name by Federico García Lorca, directed by Emilio Ruiz Barrachina.

== Filmography ==
=== Cinema ===
- Yerma - Directed by: Emilio Ruiz Barrachina.

=== Television ===
Year	Series	Character	Channel	Duration
2012 - 2013	La Riera	Alba Comas	TV3	+300 episodes
2015 - 2017	Seis hermanas	Celia Silva	La 1	489 episodes
2018	Cançó per a tu	Laia	TV3	TV movie
2019	Estoy vivo	Mónica Conde	La 1	4 episodes
2020	Caronte	Sonia Vela	Prime Video / Telecinco	1 episode

=== Theater ===
- Un marido ideal - Directed by: Juan Carlos Pérez de la Fuente, Dramaturgy: Oscar Wilde.
- Humans - Directed by: Mario Gas, Dramaturgy: Stephen Karam (2018-2019).
- Incendios - Directed by: Mario Gas, Dramaturgy: Wajdi Mouawad (2017).
- El loco de los balcones, as Lleana. - Directed by: Gustavo Tambascio, Dramaturgy: Mario Vargas Llosa (2014).
- Doña Rosita la soltera o el lenguaje de las flores - Directed by: Joan Ollé, Dramaturgy: Federico García Lorca (2014).
- Espíritus vivos, personas muertas - Directed by: Sergi Vizcaíno (2013).
- Taxi...Al TNC! - Directed by: Xavier Albertí (2013).
- Frankenstein - Directed by: Juanma Gómez, text adapted by Alberto Conejero from the novel Frankenstein o el moderno Prometeo (2012).
- Julio César, AS Calpurnia - Directed by: Francisco Vidal, text adapted by Fernando Sansegundo (2011-2012).
- La alegría de vivir, AS Gilda. - Directed by: Francisco Vidal, text adapted by José Ramón Fernández, Dramaturgy: Noël Coward (2011).

== Awards ==
- Premio Andalesgai a la visibilidad 2015, along with her co-star Luz Valdenebro, for their roles in the series Seis Hermanas.
- Augurio Sita Murt 2018 Award at the Zoom Festival of Igualdada, in the category of young talents in the audiovisual world.

== Private life ==
She is the daughter of singer-songwriter Joan Manuel Serrat and model Candela Tiffón..

Since 2015 she has been in a relationship with actor Daniel Muriel, with whom she coincided in the series Seis hermanas. The couple announced their marriage engagement on their social networks at the end of 2018, and married the weekend of June 6 and 7, 2019 in Menorca. Their daughter Mérida was born on July 4, 2020.
