= 39th Karlovy Vary International Film Festival =

2004 film festival edition

The 39th Karlovy Vary International Film Festival took place from 2 to 10 July 2004. The Crystal Globe was won by A Children's Story, an Italian drama film directed by Andrea and Antonio Frazzi. The second prize, the Special Jury Prize was won by Here, a Croatian drama film directed by Zrinko Ogresta.

== Juries ==
The following people formed the juries of the festival:

Main competition

- Al Ruban, Jury President (USA)
- Florinda Bolkan (Italy)
- Simon Field (UK)
- Katarzyna Figura (Poland)
- Hong Sang-soo (South Korea)
- Vladmir Maškov (Russia)
- Alice Nellis (Czech Republic)

Documentaries

- Bruno Aščuks, president (Latvia)
- Alexander Gutman (Russia)
- Miroslav Janek (Czech Republic)
- Ruth Mader (Austria)
- Dennis West (USA)

== Official selection awards ==
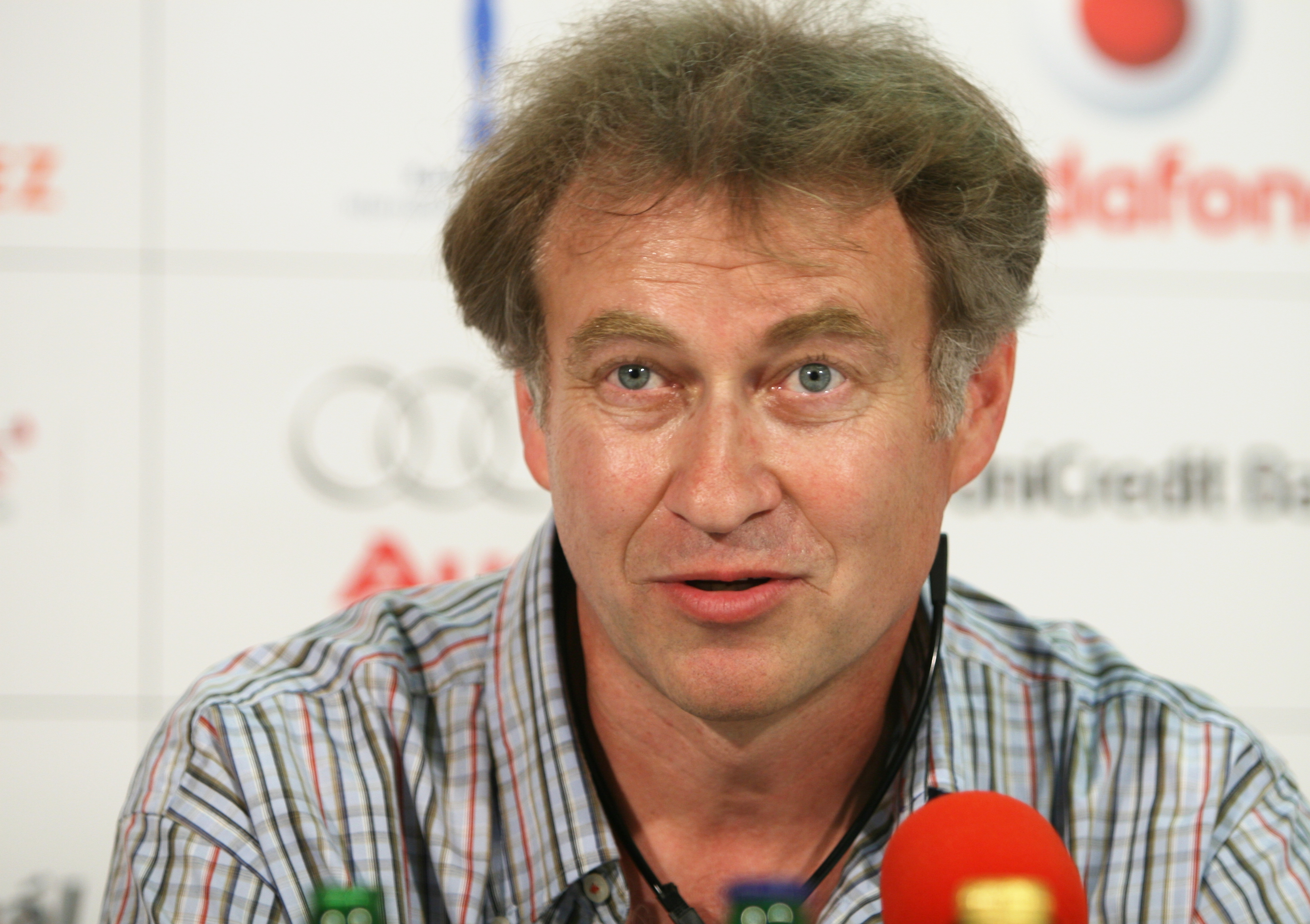
Zrinko Ogresta, director of Here

The following feature films and people received the official selection awards:

- Crystal Globe (Grand Prix) - A Children's Story (Certi bambini) by Andrea and Antonio Frazzi (Italy)
- Special Jury Prize - Here (Tu) by Zrinko Ogresta (Croatia, Bosnia and Herzegovina)
- Best Director Award - Xavier Bermúdez for León and Olvido (León y Olvido) (Spain)
- Best Actress Award (ex aequo) - Karen-Lise Mynster for her role in Aftermath (Lad de små børn) (Denmark) and Marta Larralde for her role in León and Olvido (León y Olvido) (Spain)
- Best Actor Award - Max Riemelt for his role in Before the Fall (Napola) (Germany)

== Other statutory awards ==
Other statutory awards that were conferred at the festival:

- Best documentary film (over 30 min.) - Niceho nelituji (I do not regret anything) by Theodora Remundová (Czech Republic)
- Best documentary film (under 30 min.) - Wedding of Silence (Svadba tishiny) by Pavel Medvedev (Russia)
  - Special Jury Prize - Days Under (Untertage) by Jiska Rickels (Netherlands)
- Crystal Globe for Outstanding Artistic Contribution to World Cinema - Harvey Keitel (USA), Miroslav Ondříček (Czech Republic), Roman Polanski (Poland, France)
- Award of the Town of Karlovy Vary - Jacqueline Bisset (USA)
- Award of the Karlovy Vary District - Jiří Bartoška
- Ecumenical Jury Prize for Extraordinary Contributions - Eva Zaoralová
- Právo Audience Award - The Story of the Weeping Camel (Ingen nulims) by Byambasuren Davaa and Luigi Falorni (Germany, Mongolia)

== Non-statutory awards ==
The following non-statutory awards were conferred at the festival:

- FIPRESCI International Critics Award: My Step Brother Frankenstein (Moy svodnyy brat Frankenshteyn) by Valery Todorovsky (Russia)
- FICC - The Don Quixote Prize: The Riverside (Kenar-e roodkhaneh) by Alireza Amini (Iran)
  - Special Mention: Aftermath (Lad de små børn...) by Paprika Steen (Denmark)
- Ecumenical Jury Award: Cavedweller by Lisa Cholodenko (USA)
- Philip Morris Film Award: Witnesses (Svjedoci) by Vinko Brešan (Croatia)
- Czech TV Award - Independent Camera: Dandelion by Mark Milgard (USA)
