= A Children's Story (book) =

2001 novel by Diego De Silva

Certi bambini
- Author: Diego De Silva
- Language: Italian
- Genre: Novel
- Set in: Naples
- Publisher: Einaudi
- Publication date: 2001

Certi bambini is a novel by Diego De Silva, set in present-day Naples.

The book received the Premio Selezione Campiello and the Premio Brancati in 2001, and the Premio Bergamo in 2002.

== Plot ==
The novel begins with Rosario preparing breakfast for his grandmother and then getting ready for a five-a-side football match. He puts a gun in his bag, intending to obey the orders of the Camorra and commit his first murder. On the way, Rosario reflects on the events that brought him to this point, his work at a shelter, and the people around him, including Santino, one of the volunteers at the shelter, and Caterina, an older girl on whom he develops his first crush. Caterina's death in childbirth leads him to seek revenge through criminal means.

The narrative follows Rosario's every movement. He is a child who does good as easily as he does evil, because he has never been taught the difference between the two.

At the crucial moment, Rosario remembers everything his boss told him and follows the plan. When he sees a man arrive and the lights go out, he understands that this is the signal. He takes the gun out of his bag and shoots the man. He then leaves, and by the time the police arrive, he is playing football.

== Adaptation ==
The novel was adapted into the 2004 film A Children's Story, directed by Andrea Frazzi and Antonio Frazzi.

== Editions ==
- Diego De Silva, Certi bambini, Einaudi, Turin, 2001.
- (in Dutch) Diego De Silva, Moordkinderen, translated from Italian by Tom de Keyzer, Serena libri, Amsterdam, 2002.
- (in Spanish) Diego De Silva, Ciertos niños, Espasa-Calpe, Madrid, 2002.
- (in German) Diego De Silva, Gewisse Kinder, Berlin-Verl., Berlin, 2003.
