= Daniel Muriel =

Spanish actor (born 1977)

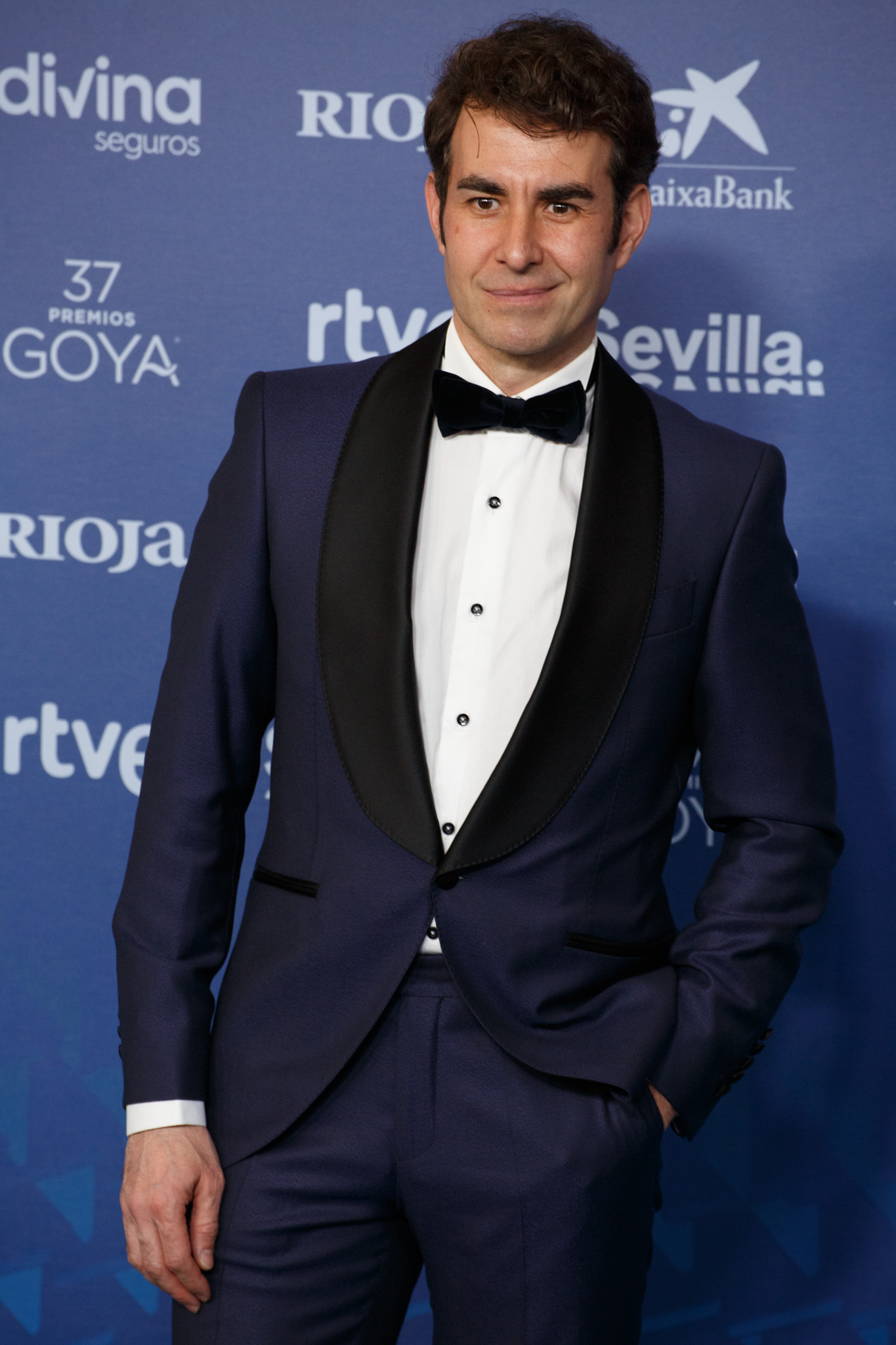
- Muriel in 2023
- Born: 11 June 1977 (age 49); Valladolid, Spain
- Education: RESAD
- Occupation: Actor
- Spouse: Candela Serrat (m. 2019)

Daniel Muriel (born 11 June 1977) is a Spanish actor.

== Biography ==
Daniel Muriel was born in Valladolid on 11 June 1977. He dropped from a degree in English Philology to study Dramatic Art at the RESAD. In his early television career, Muriel featured from 1999 to 2003 as collaborator of Noche de fiesta by José Luis Moreno. He earned further public recognition in 2007 upon his appearance in sketch comedy series Escenas de matrimonio (2007−09). He later featured in series Gym Tony, Seis hermanas and Servir y proteger. He also played a recurring role in La que se avecina. He portrayed Manolo Escobar in Cristo y Rey.

His film work include performances in Dark Blue Almost Black (2006), 8 Dates (2008), Six Points About Emma (2011) and Como la espuma (2017).

He married Candela Serrat in 2019.

== Accolades ==
Year	Award	Category	Work	Result	Ref.
2014	23rd Actors and Actresses Union Awards	Best Film Actor in a Minor Role	Diamantes negros	Won	
2015	24th Actors and Actresses Union Awards	Best Stage Actor in a Secondary Role	Las heridas del viento	Nominated	
2015	24th Actors and Actresses Union Awards	Best Stage Actor in a Minor Role	Los miércoles no existen	Nominated	
2024	32nd Actors and Actresses Union Awards	Best Television Actor in a Minor Role	Untameable	Nominated	
