= A Children's Story =

A Children’s Story
- Directed by: Andrea Frazzi; Antonio Frazzi; Gabriele Muccino
- Produced by: Rosario Rinaldo
- Starring: Gianluca Di Gennaro
- Release date: 2004
- Country: Italy
- Language: Neapolitan

A Children's Story (Italian: Certi bambini), also known as Certain Children in Australia, is an Italian drama film directed by Andrea and Antonio Frazzi which focuses on the life of an eleven-year-old boy growing up in an environment of poverty and criminality in Naples. It is based on the novel written by Diego De Silva. This was the second film to be made by the Frazzi twins, Il cielo cade (starring Isabella Rossellini and JeroenKrabbé) having been released in 2000. It was Andrea Frazzi's last film; he died in May 2006.

Certi bambini was awarded the 2004 Crystal Globe at the 39th Karlovy Vary International Film Festival.

== Plot ==
Rosario, an 11-year-old boy, lives in an apartment building on the outskirts of Naples with his grandmother Liliana, who is old and sick. Born into an environment of confusion and crime, he constantly oscillates between bad influences, such as Damiano, a criminal who exploits his gang, the camorra, and good habits, like his grandmother, whom he takes care of, and the local church. His days are spent hanging around arcades, bad sandwich shops, committing petty crimes, and playing impromptu Russian roulette on the ring road. He also attends a shelter run by volunteers that helps struggling families. His role models are Damiano, a thug from the neighborhood, and Santino, a volunteer at the shelter. One day, Rosario meets Caterina there, falls in love with her, and his life seems to improve. But a series of negative events eventually pushes him into the arms of organized crime, and evil becomes an inescapable fate. The material decay of the crumbling city transforms into the moral decay of the young boys, who have no other option but to follow their destined path as small criminals.

== Cast ==
- Gianluca Di Gennaro as Rosario
- Carmine Recano as Damiano
- Arturo Paglia as Santino
- Sergio Solli as Casaluce
- Rolando Ravello as Sciancalepore
- Marcello Romolo as Don Alfonso
- Mario Giordano
- Nuccia Fumo
- Terence Guida
- Miriam Candurro as Catarina
- Carlo Caracciolo
- Francesco Di Leva
- Marcella Granito as Giulia
- Alessandro Guasco
- Gennaro Mirto
- Patrizio Rispo
- Maria Laura Rondanini

== Awards ==
- Karlovy Vary International Film Festival: Best Film

== See also ==
- List of Italian films of 2004
