= The Archimedes Principle =

- Spanish: El principio de Arquímedes
- Directed by: Gerardo Herrero
- Written by: Belén Gopegui
- Produced by: Gerardo Herrero
- Starring: Marta Belaustegui; Roberto Enríquez; Alberto Jiménez; Blanca Oteyza; Vicky Peña; Manuel Morón; Víctor Clavijo
- Cinematography: Alfredo F. Mayo
- Music by: Lucio Godoy
- Production company: Tornasol Films
- Distributed by: Alta Films
- Release date: 2 April 2004
- Running time: 100 minutes
- Country: Spain
- Language: Spanish

The Archimedes Principle (Spanish: El principio de Arquímedes) is a 2004 film directed by Gerardo Herrero and written by Belén Gopegui which stars Marta Belaustegui, Roberto Enríquez, Alberto Jiménez and Blanca Oteyza. The plot is set in 21st-century Madrid.

== Cast ==
- Marta Belaustegui as Sonia
- Roberto Enríquez as Mariano
- Blanca Oteyza as Rocío
- Alberto Jiménez as Andrés
- Vicky Peña as Carmen
- Manuel Morón as Nicolás
- Víctor Clavijo as Pedro
- Omar Muñoz as David
- Nerea Casares as Ángela

== See also ==
- List of Spanish films of 2004
