= Cámbiame de noche =

- Genre: Makeover show
- Presented by: Marta Torné
- Starring: Cristina Rodríguez; Pelayo Díaz; Natalia Ferviú
- Country of origin: Spain
- Original language: Spanish
- No. of seasons: 1
- No. of episodes: 8

Production
- Running time: 50 minutes (approx.)
- Production companies: La Fabrica de la Tele; Mediaset España

Original release
- Network: Telecinco
- Release: September 23 – November 25, 2015

Cámbiame de noche (English: Change me at night)is a TV show dedicated to makeovers. The format, presented by Marta Torné, was produced by La Fábrica de la Tele and was broadcast on Telecinco on Wednesdays at 10pm between 23 September and 25 November 2015.

This programme was the second spin-off of the post-teatime programme Cámbiame, which was also presented by Marta Torné, and run with the same style. Cámbiame de noche went out as a result of the cancellation of Cámbiame premium, the first Cámbiame spin-off presented by Jorge Javier Vázquez, due to its small audience shares, was cancelled after three programmes on Telecinco primetime.

== History ==
Due to the success of Cámbiame in the daily post-teatime slot on Telecinco, Mediaset España decided to bring a variety block to the channel's primetime slot which, under the same name, would deal with makeovers, home transformations, cars or businesses, changes in attitude of the participants, birthday celebrations, marriage proposals or changes to neighbourhoods or whole villages, among other things. So, on 1 September 2015, Cámbiame premium arrived, a weekly programme presented by Jorge Javier Vázquez and had the collaboration of the judges on the daytime version. However, the slipping audience figures which it received during its sole three weeks on air, got it cancelled on 15 September of the same year.

After the retirement of Cámbiame premium, the channel decided to reformulate and adapt to the weekly access primetime slot. In this format, on 23 September 2015 Cámbiame de noche arrived, which initially was going to be named Cámbiame TOP, done at the same time as the second series of B&b, de boca en boca inside the block La noche de la moda.

However, and, after eight weeks of broadcast in primetime, on 24 November 2015 the cancellation of the show was announced due to its low audience figures. It was replaced by the programme Cazamariposas.

== Format ==
The show contained a 10-metre conveyor belt, the one way to enter the jury's area. For seven seconds, whilst the jury arrived on the conveyor belt, they had to convince them, with their stories, to change them. If one of them pressed the buzzer, the conveyor belt, which had a green light normally, would change to the colour yellow. If two did, it would turn orange, if all three did, it would turn red and would stop, meaning the jury would decide not to change them. On the contrary, if they didn't press the buzzer, the contestant would have to choose a member of the jury which they wanted to change their style, unless there was only one who didn't press the buzzer, who would start the process.

After they changed their style, the transformation process would be seen (i.e. clothes, shoes, make-up including tattoos), although the result would not be seen until the final. In addition, the story of the contestant would also be known after friends and family's testimonies. Finally, the conveyor belt would turn to reveal the chosen one, where they would be seen by friends and family on both sides of the conveyor belt and could check their makeover in a large mirror.

== Ratings ==
Series	Episodes	Premiered	Ended	Audience	Share
1	8	23 September 2015	25 November 2015	1,785,000	9.2%

Series 1
Episode	Date aired	Person changed	Done by	Viewers	Share
1	23 September 2015	Mercedes	Natalia Ferviú	1,603,000	8.7%
2	30 September 2015	Juani	Cristina Rodríguez	1,798,000	9.5%
2	30 September 2015	Sarah	Pelayo Díaz	1,798,000	9.5%
3	7 October 2015	Fuensanta	Cristina Rodríguez	1,907,000	9.0%
4	14 October 2015	Andrew	Natalia Ferviú	1,920,000	9.9%
5	21 October 2015	María	Pelayo Díaz	1,789,000	9.5%
6	28 October 2015	Fernando	Cristina Rodríguez	1,780,000	9.0%
7	4 November 2015	Ana	Natalia Ferviú	1,820,000	9.3%
8	25 November 2015	Ángeles	Cristina Rodríguez	1,664,000	8.5%

== See also ==
- Cámbiame, the show on which the spin-off was based.
