= Vicky Peña =

Spanish actress

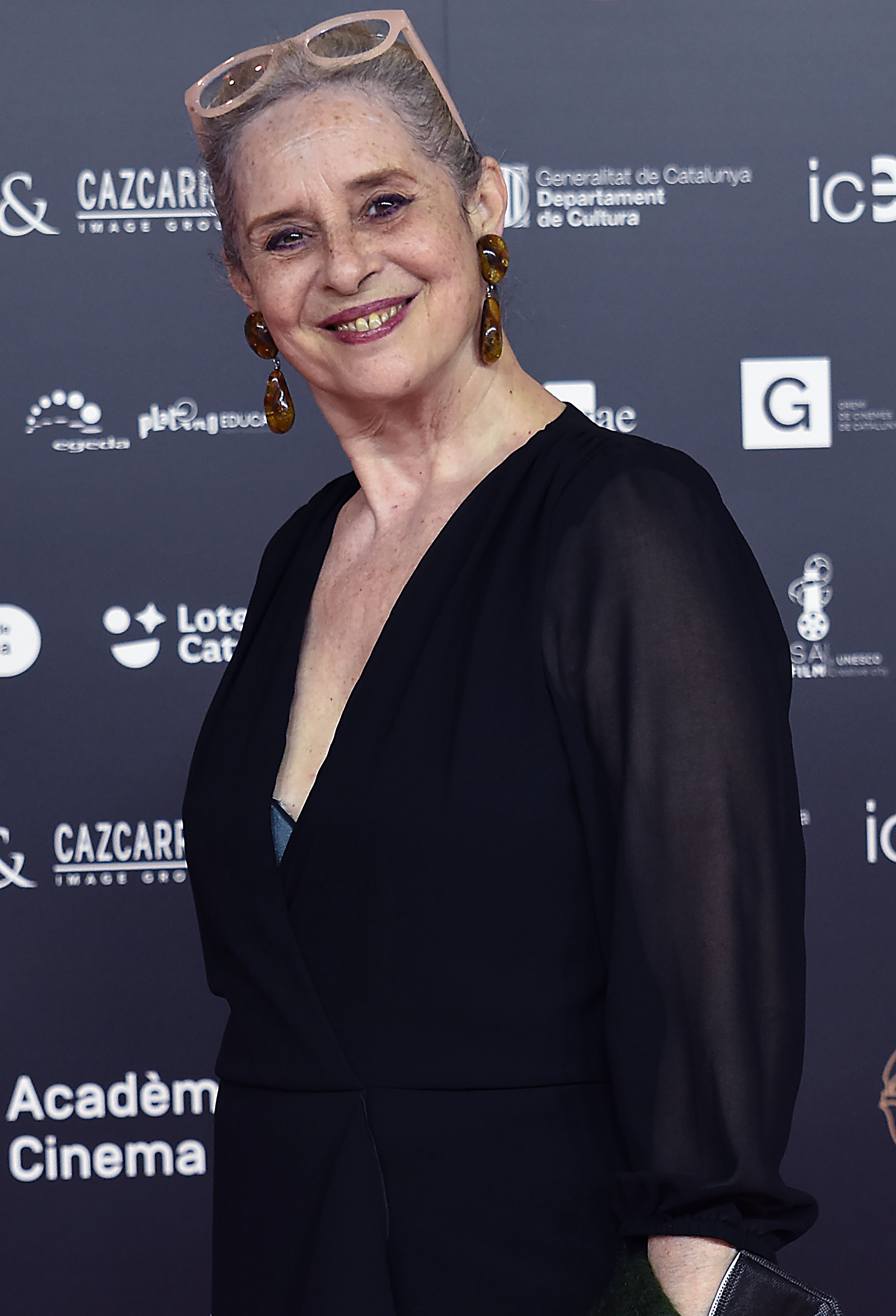
- Peña in 2021
- Born: Maria Victòria Peña Carulla; 11 January 1954 (age 72); Barcelona, Spain
- Occupation: Actress

Maria Victòria Peña Carulla (born 11 January 1954) better known as Vicky Peña is a Spanish actress.

She is one of the most important voice actors in Catalan and Spanish.

== Family and early life ==
She is the daughter of the actors Felip Peña and Montserrat Carulla, and the mother of Miranda Gas.

She started working in the 1966 TV series La pequeña comedia. Since then, she has been nominated and rewarded with several prizes. In 2005, she was elected as Vice President of the Professional Actors and Directors Association of Catalonia.

== Selected filmography ==
- Werther (1986)
- La casa de Bernarda Alba (1987)
- Entre rojas (1995)
- The Good Life (1996)
- Marquise (1997)
- Secretos del corazón (1997)
- El pianista (1998)
- Em dic Sara (1999) .
- Sé quién eres (2000) .
- Morir (o no) (2000)
- Noche de fiesta (2002)
- Smoking Room (2002)
- Piedras (2002)
- El deseo de ser piel roja (2002)
- Las voces de la noche (2003)
- Joves (2004)
- El principio de Arquímedes (2004)
- Con mostaza sabe mejor (2005)
- Pactar amb el gat (2006)
- The Apostate (2015)
- Seis hermanas (2015-2017)
- Libertad (2021) as Ángela
- La manzana de oro (2022) as Manolita

== Theatre ==
- El diccionario (2012-2014) by Manuel Calzada Pérez
- Follies (2012) by Stephen Sondheim and James Goldman
- A Streetcar Named Desire (2011)
- Homebody Kabul, by Tony Kushner (2007)
- Al llarg del Kurt (2006)
- Els estiuejants (2006)
- La Orestiada (2004)
- Electra (2003)
- Edipo XXI (2002)
- La Mare Coratge i els seus fills (2001)
- A Little Night Music (2000)
- Guys and Dolls (1998)
- La reina de bellesa de Leenane (The Beauty Queen of Leenane) by Martin McDonagh. Directed by Mario Gas (1998)
- Sweeney Todd, by Stephen Sondheim (1995)
- Othello, by William Shakespeare. Directed by Mario Gas (1994).
- Golfos de Roma by Stephen Sondheim and Burt Shevelove (1993)
- El temps i els Conway (Time and the Conways) by J. B. Priestley(1992)
- L’hort dels cirerers (The Cherry Orchard) by Anton Chekhov (1991)
- Les tres germanes (Three Sisters) by Anton Chekhov. (1990)
- Dancing! (1988)
- La balada de Calamity Jane (1987)
- Madre Coraje y sus hijos, by Bertolt Brecht (1986).
- L’òpera de tres rals, by Bertolt Brecht (1984)
- Les noces de Figaro (1977)
- Tirant lo Blanc, by Joanot Martorell (1976)
- El criat de dos amos, by Carlo Goldoni (1974)
