= Caronte (TV series) =

Spanish television series

- Genre: Legal drama; Police drama; Family drama
- Created by: Verónica Fernández
- Directed by: Joaquín Llamas; Sandra Gallego; Alberto Ruiz-Rojo; Jesús Font
- Starring: Roberto Álamo; Miriam Giovanelli; Carlos Hipólito
- Country of origin: Spain
- Original language: Spanish
- No. of seasons: 1
- No. of episodes: 13

Production
- Running time: 75 min (approx.)
- Production companies: Mediaset España; Big Bang Media

Original release
- Network: Amazon Prime Video
- Release: 6 March 2020

Caronte is a Spanish drama television series created by Verónica Fernández and produced by Mediaset España in collaboration with Big Bang Media. It made its debut in March 2020 on Amazon Prime Video before its free-to-air broadcasting.

== Premise ==
Samuel Caronte (Roberto Álamo), a police officer, is convicted for a crime he did not commit. While in prison, he graduated in law. After leaving prison, he becomes a lawyer, partnering with Marta Pelayo (Miriam Giovanelli), vowing to represent those who do not have access to an adequate legal defence.

The fiction takes place in between Gijón and Madrid.

== Cast ==
- Roberto Álamo as Samuel Caronte.
- Miriam Giovanelli as Marta Pelayo.
- Carlos Hipólito as Comisario Paniagua.
- Belén López as Julia.
- Raúl Tejón as Aurelio.
- Álex Villazán as Guille.
- Marta Larralde as Natalia.
- Andrea Trepat as Irina.
- Itziar Atienza as Paula.
- Sofía Oria as Irene.
- Luis Rallo as Ignacio.
- Julieta Serrano as Samuel Caronte's mother.

With the special collaboration of

- Nathalie Poza.
- Miguel Bernardeau.
- Marta Nieto.
- Candela Serrat.

== Production and release ==
Created by Verónica Fernández, the series is a mashup of legal drama, police drama and family drama. It was produced by Mediaset España in collaboration with Big Bang Media. Shooting began in November 2018, and it took place in Madrid and Gijón. Joaquín Llamas, Sandra Gallego, Alberto Ruiz-Rojo and Jesús Font directed the episodes. Consisting of 13 episodes with a running time of about 75 minutes, the series was launched on Amazon Prime Video on 6 March 2020. After its release on Prime Video, Mediaset España chose Cuatro rather than its flagship channel Telecinco for the free-to-air broadcasting of the series. The first episode aired on Cuatro on 15 March 2021 earned "good" ratings (1,119,000 viewers and a 7.9% share), above the channel's average.

Series	Episodes	Originally released	Network
1	13	6 March 2020	Amazon Prime Video
