= Lena (film) =

- Theatrical release poster
- Directed by: Gonzalo Tapia
- Screenplay by: Gonzalo Tapia; Antonio Trashorras; David Muñoz
- Starring: Marta Larralde; Manuel Manquiña; Roberto Álvarez
- Cinematography: Carles Gusi
- Edited by: Ángel Hernández Zoido
- Music by: José Carlos Mac
- Production companies: Tráfico de Ideas; Producciones La Iguana; Alta Films; Portozás Visión; Take 2000
- Distributed by: Alta Films
- Release dates: 1 May 2001 (Cine Fraga); 11 May 2001 (Spain)
- Countries: Spain; Portugal
- Language: Spanish

Lena is a 2001 Spanish-Portuguese coming-of-age drama film directed by Gonzalo Tapia which stars Marta Larralde as the title character alongside Manuel Manquiña and Roberto Álvarez.

== Plot ==
Set in Vigo, the plot follows teenager Lena and her relationship with her father Gorrión (in a situation of long-term unemployement) as well as with the group of local drug-smuggling henchmen who badly beat Gorrión.

== Cast ==
- Marta Larralde as Lena
- Manuel Manquiña as Gorrión
- Roberto Álvarez as Milio
- Vitor Norte as Cachero
- Luis Tosar as Gitano
- Luis Zahera as Antonio
- Iván Hermés as Manu
- Antón Reixa as comisario Fernández
- Carlos Kaniowsky as Esteban
- Nuria Sanz as Mariola
- Irene García Bustos as Carmen
- Israel Rodríguez as Toño
- Andrés Fraga as Sebe
- Josito Porto as Ramón
- Luma Gómez as Rosa
- Feli Manzano as Isabel

== Production ==
The film is a Trafico de Ideas, La Iguana, Alta Films, Portozas Vision, and Take 2000 Spanish-Portuguese co-production with the participation of TVG, TVE, and Canal+. It boasted a 250 million ₧ budget. It was primarily shot in Vigo.

== Release ==
The film received a pre-screening at Vigo's Cine Fraga on 1 May 2001. Distributed by Alta Films, it was released theatrically in Spain on 11 May 2001.

== Reception ==
Casimiro Torreiro of El País described the film as "a straightforward, linear, unpretentious film that tells a simple yet effective story".

Jonathan Holland of Variety considered that the film manages to pull it off pretty well the fusing of coming-of-age teen drama with a "none-too-gripping tale of villainous drug runners".

== See also ==
- List of Spanish films of 2001
- List of Portuguese films of 2001
