= León and Olvido =

- Directed by: Xavier Bermúdez
- Written by: Xavier Bermúdez
- Starring: Marta Larralde; Guillem Jiménez; Gary Piquer; Jaime Vázquez l Mighello Blanco; Rebeca Montero; Nerea Barros
- Music by: Coché Villanueva
- Release date: 2004
- Running time: 112 minutes
- Country: Spain
- Languages: Spanish; Galician

León and Olvido (León y Olvido in Spanish, León e Olvido in Galician) is a 2004 Spanish movie. A sequel, Olvido and León (Olvido y León), premeried in 2020.

== Plot ==
León and Olvido are two orphan twin siblings. Their relationship is very contradictory, León has Down syndrome and Olvido loves him, but she thinks she has no choice but to look after him...

== Awards ==
- Premio especial del Jurado en el Festival de Cine Español de Málaga (2004).
- 39th Karlovy Vary International Film Festival: Best Director (Xavier Bermúdez) & Best Actress (Marta Larralde) (2004)
- Public Price in Athens International Festival (2004)
- CineEspaña Festival in Toulouse, Best script, Best Actress (Marta Larralde) (2004)
- Independent Cinema Ourense Festival: Best Director (Xavier Bermúdez) Best Actress (Marta Larralde) (2004)
- Black Nights Film Festival (Tallinn /Estonia) (2004)
- FIPRESCI Price and Special Mention to Guillem Jiménez in Tbilisi Film Festival (Tbilisi, Georgia) (2006)
