= Bernat Quintana =

Spanish actor

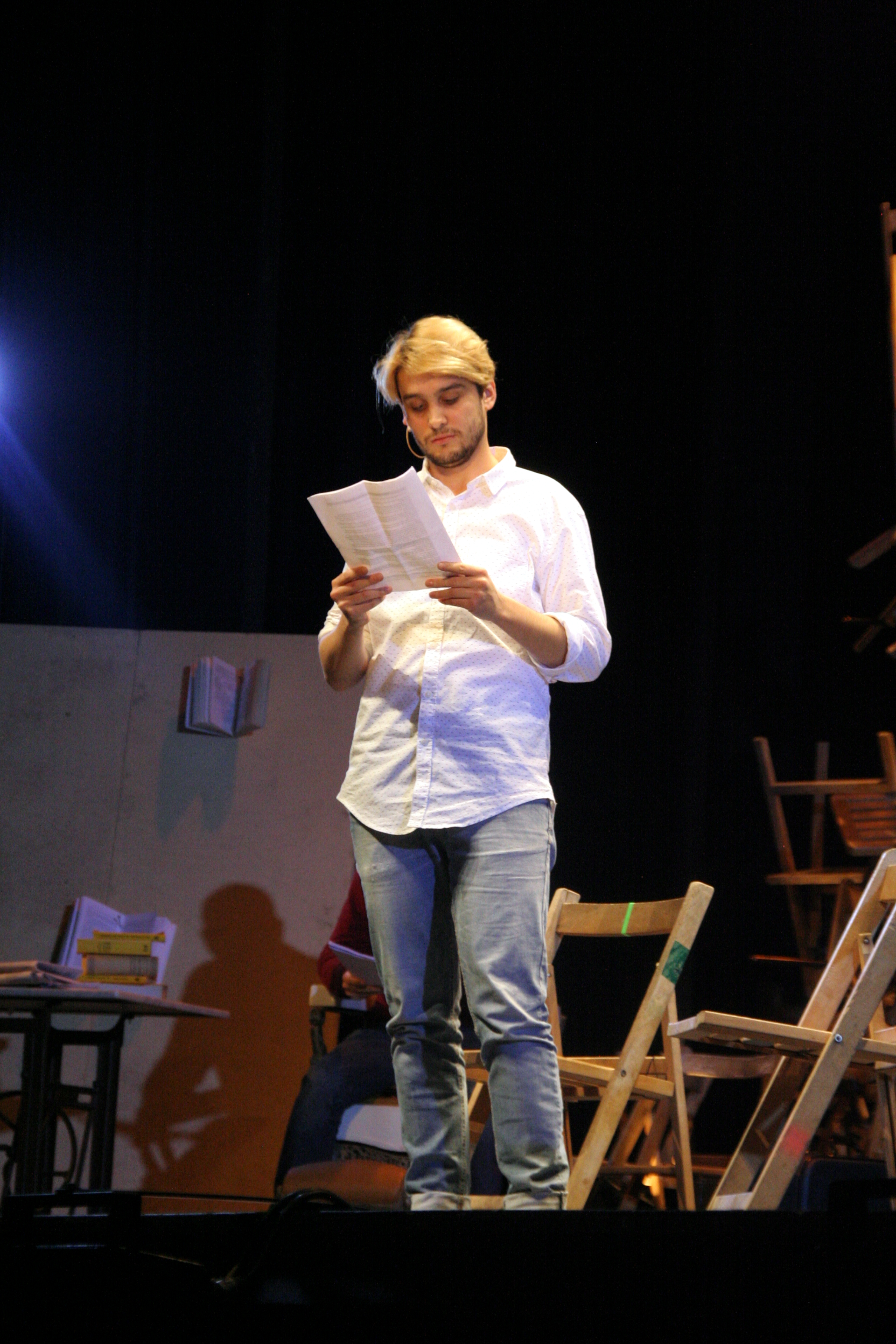
- Quintana in 2016
- Born: 15 October 1985 (age 39); Barcelona, Catalonia, Spain
- Occupation: Actor
- Years active: 1995—present

Bernat Quintana (born 1985) is a Spanish actor best known for his role as Max Carbó in TV3 television soap opera El Cor de la Ciutat and as the main character of the 2019 film Boi.

== Theatre ==
- Cyrano (2013)
- Julieta y Romeo (2011)
- Molt Soroll per no res (2011)
- Les Tres Germanes (2011)
- La Síndrome de Bucay (2010)
- El Mal de la Joventut (2009)
- Lleons (2009)
- Dublin Carol (2008)
- Búfals (2008)
- J.R.S. (2003)
- Bernadeta Xoc (1999)
- El Criptograma (1999)
- L’home, la bèstia i la virtut (1995)

== Movies ==
- Boi (2019)
- Jo, el desconegut (2007)
- Càmping (2006)
- Vorvik (2005)
- Valèria, dirigit per Sílvia Quer (2000)
- La ciudad de los prodigios (1999)
- La presó orgànica, de Jordi Soler (1998)

== Television ==
- Barcelona Ciutat Neutral (2011)
- El Cor de la Ciutat (2000–2009)
- Laura (1998)
