= Teresa (2015 film) =

- Promotional release poster
- Written by: Juanma Romero Gárriz
- Directed by: Jorge Dorado
- Starring: Marian Álvarez; David Luque; Carla Díaz; Terele Pávez; Aitana Sánchez-Gijón; Antonio de la Torre
- Music by: Federico Jusid
- Country of origin: Spain
- Original language: Spanish

Production
- Producers: Gerardo Iracheta Vallés; Luis Hernández Cardona
- Cinematography: Álvaro Gutiérrez
- Editor: Josu Martínez
- Production companies: RTVE; La Cometa TV

Original release
- Network: TVE
- Release: 17 November 2015

Teresa is a 2015 television film directed by Jorge Dorado from a screenplay by Juanma Romero which stars Marian Álvarez as the title character alongside David Luque, Carla Díaz, Terele Pávez, Aitana Sánchez-Gijón, and Antonio de la Torre.

== Plot ==
In 2015 Ávila, a teenager coping with her father's death and with school bullying opens a Teresa of Ávila's autobiography, with the plot going on to account for the 16th-century Carmelite nun's biography.

== Cast ==
- Marian Álvarez as Santa Teresa
- Carla Díaz as Teresa actual
- Aitana Sánchez-Gijón as doña Jimena
- David Luque as inquisidor Rodrigo Salazar
- Terele Pávez as priora del convento
- Antonio de la Torre as inquisidor general Fernando de Valdés
- Belén López Valcárcel
- Savitri Ceballos
- Yara Capa
- Fernando Soto
- Tomás del Estal
- José A. Lobato
- Xenia Tostado
- Claudia Téllez
- Paco Obregón
- Maite Gil
- Carmen Chaves

== Production ==
The film was co-produced by Televisión Española and La Cometa TV. Shooting locations included Ávila, Soria, Alcalá de Henares and El Escorial.

== Release ==
Teresa premiered at the 63rd San Sebastián International Film Festival (Zinemaldia) on 24 September 2015. RTVE set a television debut on La 1 for 17 November 2015.
