= Cámbiame =

- Genre: Makeover
- Presented by: Marta Torné(2015–2017); Carlota Corredera(2017–2018)
- Judges: Cristina Rodríguez(2015–2018); Pelayo Díaz(2015–2018); Natalia Ferviú(2015–2018); Juan Avellaneda(2017/2018); Paloma González Durántez (2018)
- No. of seasons: 4
- No. of episodes: 672

Production
- Executive producer: Mediaset España Comunicación
- Running time: 60 minutes (roughly)
- Production company: La Fábrica de la Tele

Original release
- Network: Telecinco
- Release: 15 June 2015 – 13 April 2018

Related
- Cámbiame VIP; Cámbiame Challenge; Cámbiame Premium; Cámbiame de noche Cambio radical El patito feo

Cámbiame was a Spanish reality television show focused on makeovers. The style, which was presented by Marta Torné and later by Carlota Corredera, was developed by La Fábrica de la Tele and it was broadcast on Telecinco from Monday to Friday from 1:50 p.m. to 3:00 pm, between 15 June 2015 and 13 April 2018.

== History ==
At the beginning of 2015, due to the success of US makeover TV shows broadcast on Divinity, Mediaset España considered copying this style, going back to old styles of shows such as Cambio radical or El patito feo (Antena 3). So, in February, the Spanish group approved a pilot episode to the production company La Fábrica de la Tele.

After some months without relevant news, and despite having a lot of promotion and information for selecting participants through Sálvame, in April it was selected in the 2015 edition of the Cannes MIP TV as one of the best non-fiction and entertainment TV shows. Later on, in May, it was announced that Marta Torné would be the host and that Cristina Rodriguez and Pelayo Díaz would be two of the three stylists. Shortly thereafter, Natalia Ferviú was confirmed as the last member of the stylist team, instead of the designer and stylist Gala González, who appeared in the pilot with Cristina and Pelayo, but couldn't participate in the show due to a scheduling conflict.

Finally, once the preparations were completed, Telecinco and Divinity piloted Cámbiame simultaneously on Monday 15 June 2015 at 2:20 pm, keeping it on daily broadcast on Telecinco.

After three weeks of broadcasting, Telecinco confirmed that this show would be broadcast at prime time on the main channel under the name Cámbiame Premium, featuring Jorge Javier Vázquez with the collaboration of the stylists in the daily version. Moreover, it was broadcast live and involved physical changes and also changes in the environment of the participants. After its cancellation, the makeovers were still broadcast in a pre-prime time show called Cámbiame de noche, presented by Marta Torné.

Furthermore, on 9 December 2016 it was confirmed that Marta Torné would leave the show to retake her career as an actress. After her departure, Telecinco entrusted Carlota Corredera with the hosting of the format. She would join the show in January 2017.

A year later, on 29 January 2018, despite its slight loss of viewership, Telecinco wanted to renew the show by adding new teams of stylists, and replacing the sets where the change was carried out. It also included some changes to the participant's home, with personal advice on shopping and the incorporation of a new jury. Besides, it was live broadcast and it extended its duration. However, the viewership didn't increase with those changes, so Telecinco finally decided to cancel the show. The last episode was broadcast on 13 April 2018 and the show was replaced by the game show Pasapalabra en familia.

== Format ==
=== First round ===
The space has a ten-metre mechanical catwalk, which connects the entrance door to the coaches area entrance. For 60 seconds, while the participants arrive at the three stylists to the conveyor belt, they should be convinced by their stories to manage to get a change. If one of the juries pushes the button, the catwalk, which has two green lights of its sides, will turn yellow; and if two push it, the light will turn orange, and if all they push it, it will turn red and it will stop because the jury don't want to change that participant, leaving them out of the programme automatically, unless one of the members of the jury decide to change their hair or make-up or in order to look like a celebrity, a process known as “Cámbiame Clon”. By contrast, if they don't push the button, the participant will have to choose a member of the jury to change his/her style, unless just one push the button it will start the transformation process.

After, the makeover arrived where the transformation process can be seen (clothes, shoes, accessories, hairstyle, makeup, manicure, pedicure, cosmetic dentistry, infiltration and even tattoos), though the result won't be shown until the end. Furthermore, the participants' history is known through family and friends’ testimony. In the end, the catwalk starts to work again to welcome the participant waited by their family and so that he/she can check its change in the mirror.

=== Second round ===
After the programme's change of scenery, they stop the casting, more than one person can participate on each episode and the change starts three hours before Cámbiame is broadcast, which you can see live on Mitele.es. Moreover, at the beginning or during the episode Cámbiame Cam may work and it will choose someone from the viewership who wants to change their image. Those processes are carried out by coaches, who are helped by hairdressers and makeup artists when doing the change. Two stylists' team can make two different proposals for one participant. Likewise, sometimes they only make hairstyle and makeup changes.

On the other hand, the show has a studio divided into four areas of work: wardrobe area, hairdressing and makeup area, aesthetic area and hair washing area. There is also a waiting room where final touches are made. Then, after going through all those areas, the contestants go to the set in order to model on the catwalk with his/her new look.

At the end, the stylists explain their work, the price of each garment appears on the look and the jury is responsible for evaluating and sometimes they also grade the changes made by their workmates. But after 24 episodes the jury vanishes and the coaches are the ones who judge.

There is also the possibility to change a person in his/her house. This section is known as "Cámbiame a domicilio", in which the stylists go around Spain to make a change of image in the participant's house. In the same way, the section "Cámbiame Shopping" will help those people who don't find their clothing style by going shopping with one of the stylists, who will advise them at any time.

In "Cámbiame Collection", the programme also includes aspects about the appearance of some famous people. When they attend events like fashion shows or award ceremonies in "Cámbiame News". "Cámbiame Zoom" carries out an in-depth analysis of some of their styles. "Cámbiame Flashback" focuses on the changes that some celebrities had gone through over the years. In "Cámbiame Remember" we may see how some people that had already changed now maintain their image or in "Cámbiame Copy" they may give us tricks to copy the style of some celebrities. Moreover, through "Cambiamepedia", the stylists explain the meaning of some concepts related to the fashion world.

== Team ==
=== Host ===
- Marta Torné (Episode 1 – Episode 374)
- Carlota Corredera (Episode 375 – 647; Episode 649 – Episode 672)
- Pelayo Díaz (Episode 648)

=== Stylists ===
Stylist	Information	Episodes
(Spain) Cristina Rodríguez	Actress, host and costume designer for cinema, theatre and TV	(Episode 1 – Episode 477; Episode 508 – Episode 672)
(Spain) Pelayo Díaz	Blogger, photographer and fashion designer	(Episode 1 – Episode 619; Episode 645 – Episode 672)
(Spain) Natalia Ferviú	Creative director, fashion editor, DJ and it girl	(Episode 1 – Episode 622)
(Spain) Juan Avellaneda	Designer	(Episode 478 – Episode 507; Episode 625 – Episode 672)
(Spain) Paloma González Durántez	Creative director and stylist	(Episode 620 – Episode 672)
(Spain) Manuel Zamorano	Hairdresser and makeup artist.	Episode 660 – Episode 661)

=== Collaborators ===
Collaborator	Information	Episodes
(Spain) Manuel Zamorano	Hairdresser and makeup artist	(Episode 620 – Episode 644)
(Spain) Moncho Moreno	Hairdresser and makeup artist	(Episode 620 – Episode 642)
(Spain) Kley Kafe	Hairdresser and makeup artist	(Episode 620 – Episode 643)
(Spain) Lorena Morlote	Hairdresser and makeup artist	(Episode 630 – Episode 644)

=== Jury ===
Collaborator	Information	Episodes
(Spain) Pelayo Díaz	Blogger, photographer, fashion designer and former Cámbiame stylist	(Episode 620 – Episode 644)
(Spain) Fiona Ferrer	Journalist, blogger and fashion entrepreneur	(Episode 620 – Episode 643)
(Spain) Juan Avellaneda	Designer and previous Cámbiame stylist	(Episode 624)

=== Programmes ===
Season	Episodes	Release date	Season finale	Host(s)
1	294	15 June 2015	2 September 2016	Marta Torné
2	233	5 September 2016	1 September 2017	Marta Torné, Carlota Corredera
3	92	4 September 2017	26 January 2018	Carlota Corredera
4	53	29 January 2018	13 April 2018	Carlota Corredera
Total	672	2015	2018	Marta Torné – Carlota Corredera

=== Programmes' viewership ===
In its first two years of broadcasting, Cámbiame had an average of 12.7% share and 1.364.000 viewers, making it the preferred choice among commercial television channels. It increased its national average up to 14.3% of Television Rating Point. On 16 March 2016 its viewership record reached a 15.2% record (1,645,000 viewers). Nevertheless, as the programme format changed, the viewership began to decline in its fourth season, with around a million viewers or even less which led to its withdrawal from Telecinco's programming in 2018.

== Related TV programmes ==
- Cámbiame VIP: It is hosted by Carlota Corredera. To change celebrities makes the difference between this programme and the original one.
- Cámbiame Challenge: It is also hosted by Carlota Corredera and it is occasionally broadcast. In this programmes, the three coaches subject people to change with limited time and budget. The coach will win an award which will assign to an NGO.
- Cámbiame Premium: It was hosted by Jorge Javier Vázquez and was broadcast on Tuesdays during the first three weeks of September. The programme lasted four hours (including prime-time and late night) and had a 14.3% average viewership. Due to a drop in the viewership, Cámbiame was finally cancelled.
- Cámbiame de noche: It was hosted by Marta Torné and broadcast from 23 September to 25 November 2015 as the opening for B&B serie (a TV show). The programme, an identical version to the afternoon edition, finished at the same time that B&B did.
- Cámbiame de año: It was hosted by Marta Torné, Cristina Rodríguez, Natalia Ferviú and Pelayo Díaz on the night of 31 December 2015 to welcome 2016. They were chosen to welcome in the New Year from la Puerta del Sol in Madrid.
