= Carlota Corredera =

Spanish television presenter

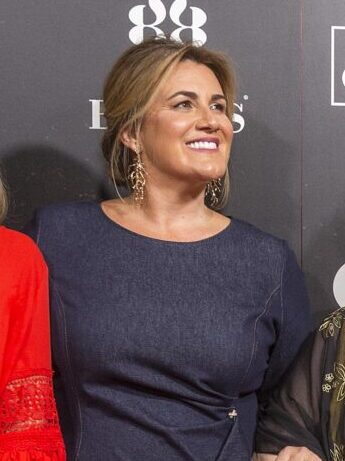
- Corredera in September 2021
- Born: Elisa Carlota Corredera Llauger; 21 July 1974 (age 51); Vigo, Spain
- Occupations: Journalist and television presenter
- Years active: 2003–present

Elisa Carlota Corredera Llauger (born in Vigo, Spain, 21 July 1974), better known as Carlota Corredera, is a Spanish presenter, director, television collaborator, and journalist, known for having directed several Telecinco programs.

== Biography ==
She graduated in journalism at the University of Santiago de Compostela in 1997; from that moment, she was linked to the newspaper La Voz de Galicia. Her television career began at en Antena 3, where she became deputy director of Ana Rosa Quintana's program Sabor a Ti in 2003.

Afterwards, she moved to Telecinco to direct programs such as TNT, El laberinto de la memoria, and Hormigas blancas. In 2009, she was given the opportunity to direct Sálvame and Sálvame Deluxe. In the latter, she stayed until 2013.

She became a collaborator of Abre los ojos y mira in 2013, and she began working as a substitute presenter of Sálvame in 2014.In the summer of that same year, she was a collaborator in Hable con ellas and presented the docurreality Las Campos. At the end of 2016, it was announced she would sign as the new presenter of Cámbiame from 9 January 2017.

On 18 May 2017, her first book, called On 18 May 2017, her first book, called "Tú también puedes: Cómo conseguí perder 60 kilos y ganar salud". She released her second book, called "Hablemos de nosotras" at the end of 2019.

In 2021, she began presenting the documentary series debate Rocío, contar la verdad para seguir viva.

== Television ==
=== Television programs ===
==== As a director ====
Year	Program	Channel	Role
2003–2004	Sabor a ti	Antena 3	Assistant director
2004–2007	TNT	Telecinco	Directora
2007–2009	El laberinto de la memoria	Telecinco	Directora
2009–2011	Hormigas blancas	Telecinco	Directora
2009–2014	Sálvame	Telecinco	Directora
2010–2014	Sálvame Deluxe	Telecinco	Directora

==== As a presenter ====
Year	Program	Channel	Role
2014–2022	Sálvame	Telecinco	Host
2016	Sálvame Snow Week	Telecinco	Host
2016–2018	Las Campos	Telecinco	Host
2017	Cámbiame VIP	Telecinco	Host
2017	Cámbiame Challenge	Telecinco	Host
2017–2018	Cámbiame	Telecinco	Host
2019	Sálvame Okupa	Telecinco	Host
2020	La última cena	Telecinco	Substitute host
2020	Hormigas blancas	Telecinco	Host
2020	¡Quiero dinero!	Telecinco	Host
2021	Rocío, contar la verdad para seguir viva	Telecinco	Host
2022	En el nombre de Rocío	Telecinco	Host

==== As a collaborator ====
Year	Program	Channel	Role
2013–2014	Abre los ojos y mira	Telecinco	Contributor
2016	Hable con ellas	Telecinco	Contributor
2016–2017	Sálvame	Telecinco	Contributor
2017	Sábado Deluxe	Telecinco	Contributor
2022	Montealto: Regreso a la casa	Telecinco	Contributor

==== As a contestant ====
Year	Program	Channel	Role
2017	Pasapalabra	Telecinco	Contestant
2018	El concurso del Year	Cuatro	Contestant
2020	Adivina qué hago esta noche	Cuatro	Contestant
2020	Qarenta	Be Mad	Contestant
2020–2021	La última cena: Especial Nochevieja	Telecinco	Contestant – winner

=== Television series ===
Year	Serie	Channel	Character	Duration
2019	Una vida de mierda	Mtmad	Bank Director	1 episode

== Personal life ==
Carlota got married on 15 June 2013 to Carlos de la Maza, cameraman of the program Sálvame. On 22 June 2015, she gave birth to her only daughter, Alba.

== Books ==
- Tú también puedes (Memorias, Ed. Grijalbo, 2017) ISBN 9788416895144.
- Hablemos de nosotras (Reflexiones, Ed. Grijalbo, 2019) ISBN 9788417752019.

== Awards ==
- Awarded the title of "distinguished Viguesa" in 2020.
- For her work as a presenter, she received the Alcazaba Awards 2021 Communication and Creation Award.
- The Chicote Award for the best female communicator.
- The Government Delegation of the Community of Madrid bestows the Meninas 2021 Award on her for her "commitment to the defense of equality and against male violence."
- The Paloma de Plata XXI Award.
