= Wars (film) =

- French: Guerres
- Directed by: Nicolas Roy
- Written by: Cynthia Tremblay
- Produced by: Nicolas Comeau
- Starring: Éléonore Loiselle; David La Haye; Fanny Mallette
- Cinematography: Philippe Roy
- Edited by: Nicolas Roy
- Production company: 1976 Productions
- Distributed by: Be For Films
- Release date: August 25, 2021 (Karlovy Vary)
- Running time: 84 minutes
- Country: Canada
- Language: French

Wars (French: Guerres) is a Canadian drama film, directed by Nicolas Roy and released in 2021. The film stars Éléonore Loiselle as Emma Ducharme, a young military cadet who is sexually assaulted by her commanding officer (David La Haye) after they are stationed in Eastern Europe.

The cast also includes Fanny Mallette and Martine Francke.

The film premiered in competition at the 2021 Karlovy Vary Film Festival, where Loiselle won the award for Best Actress.

It was acquired for commercial distribution by Be For Films.
