= Girl Gets Girl =

- Theatrical release poster
- Spanish: De chica en chica
- Directed by: Sonia Sebastián
- Screenplay by: Cristina Pons; Ángel Turlan; Sonia Sebastián
- Produced by: Sonia Sebastián; Celia Freijeiro
- Starring: Celia Freijeiro; Cristina Pons; Sandra Collantes; Jane Badler; María Botto; Marina San José; Ismael Martínez; Jaime Olías; Estefanía de los Santos; Adrián Lastra; María Ballesteros; Sabrina Praga; Eulalia Ramón; Mar Ayala
- Cinematography: Pilar Sánchez Díaz
- Edited by: Ana Álvarez-Ossorio
- Music by: David San José
- Production companies: Pocapena Producciones; Versus Entertainment
- Distributed by: Versus Entertainment
- Release date: 25 September 2015
- Country: Spain
- Languages: Spanish; English

Girl Gets Girl (Spanish: De chica en chica) is a 2015 Spanish sapphic comedy film directed by Sonia Sebastián starring Celia Freijeiro, Cristina Pons, Sandra Collantes, and Jane Badler. It is a follow up to the comedy webseries Girl Seeks Girl.

== Plot ==
After Inés' girlfriend Becky found about Inés' affair with Kirsten, Inés returns from Miami to her homeland in Spain, coming across with heterosexual Lola (Inés' old flame), as well as with Verónica (Inés' dumped bride), erotic literature publisher Sofía, and Lola's former boyfriend Javier.

== Cast ==
- Celia Freijeiro as Inés
- Cristina Pons as Verónica
- Sandra Collantes as Lola
- Jane Badler as Kirsten
- María Botto as Sofía
- Marina San José as Blanca
- Ismael Martínez as Javier
- Jaime Olías
- Estefanía de los Santos as Linda
- Adrián Lastra
- María Ballesteros as Marta
- Sabrina Praga
- Eulalia Ramón as Reme
- Mar Ayala as Candela
- Paulina Gálvez
- Beatriz Montañez

== Production ==
The film was produced by Pocapena Producciones alongside Versus Entertainment. It was shot in Miami and Madrid.

== Release ==
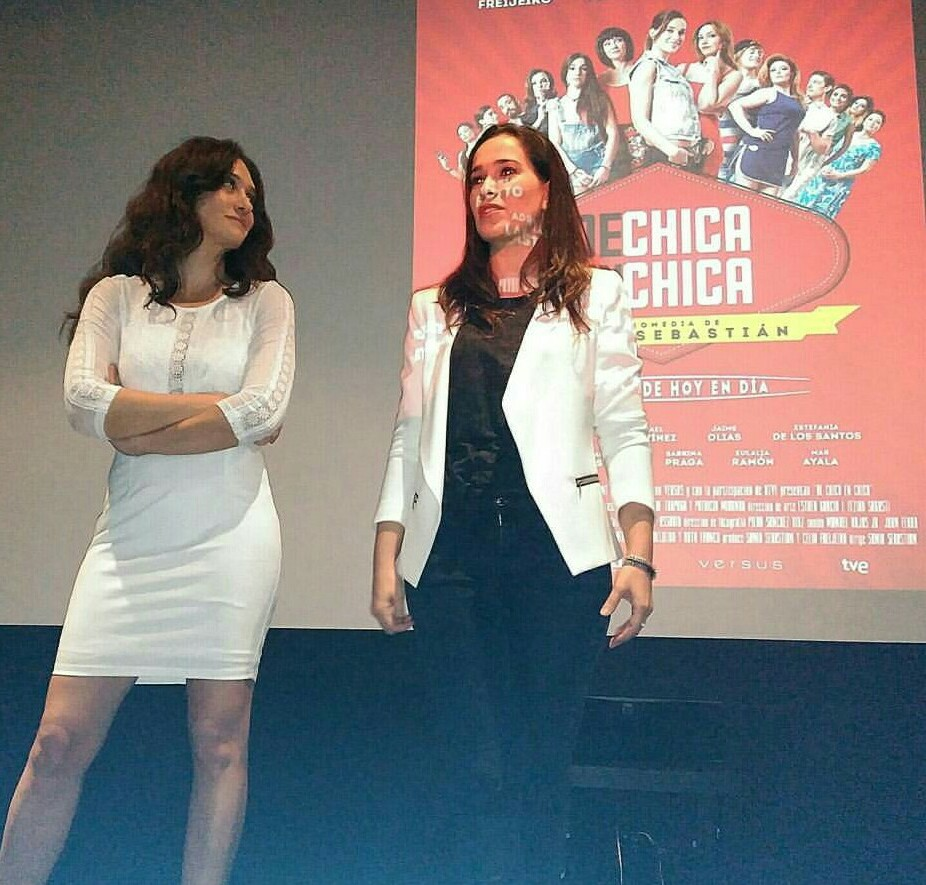
María Botto and Celia Freijeiro presenting the film

Distributed by Versus Entertainment, the film was released theatrically in Spain on 25 September 2015.

== Reception ==
Fausto Fernández of Fotogramas rated the film 2 out of 5 stars, writing that it gives the impression of being "a dated product in the least stimulating of its meanings".

Carlos Marañón of Cinemanía rated the film 2 out of 5 stars, raising flags about how the replication of schemes from "heterosexual" comedies does not help on delivering an original result.

== Accolades ==
Year	Award	Category	Nominee(s)	Result	Ref.
2016	25th Actors and Actresses Union Awards	Best New Actress	Marina San José	Nominated	

== See also ==
- List of Spanish films of 2015
