= Seis Hermanas =

Spanish telenovela

- Genre: Soap opera; Period drama
- Created by: Ramón Campos; Gema R. Neira
- Directed by: David Ulloa; Antonio Hernández; Miguel Conde; Jaime Botella; Verónica Anciones; Inma Torrente
- Starring: Carla Díaz; María Castro; Vicky Peña; Fernando Andina; Celia Freijeiro; Mariona Tena; Marta Larralde; Candela Serrat; Álex Gadea; Jorge Clemente; Álex Adróver; Llum Barrera; Pep Antón Muñoz; Juan Ribó
- Country of origin: Spain
- Original language: Spanish
- No. of seasons: 3
- No. of episodes: 489

Production
- Executive producer: Televisión Española
- Producers: Ramón Campos; Teresa Fernández-Valdés; Antonio Hernández; Nicolás Romero; Pepe Ripoll
- Running time: 55 minutes (approx.)
- Production company: Bambú Producciones for Televisión Española

Original release
- Network: La 1
- Release: April 22, 2015 – April 21, 2017

Seis Hermanas (transl. 'Six Sisters') is a Spanish soap opera produced by Bambú Producciones for Televisión Española that originally aired on La1 from April 22, 2015 to April 21, 2017. It starred María Castro, Carla Díaz, Mariona Tena, Celia Freijeiro, Marta Larralde and Candela Serrat.

== Synopsis ==
The series is set in Madrid, Spain from 1913 to 1917 and tells the story of the six Silva sisters: Adela Silva (Celia Freijeiro), the older sister, makes most of the decisions, she is correct, generous, loving and kind, she is a widow, she believes that love will never knock on her door again, Blanca Silva (Mariona Tena), she is beautiful, classist, kind, elegant and educated, engaged to the rich banker Rodolfo Loygorri (Fernando Andina), but in love with her brother-in-law, the doctor Cristóbal Loygorri (Álex Gadea), Diana Silva (Marta Larralde), she has a strong character, replaces her father at the head of the Silva family factory, is the enterprising sister, believes that women are undervalued and, although she does not count on finding the love of her life, her destiny has different plans for her, Francisca Silva (María Castro), she sings in secret at the Ambigú but her dream is to sing for a more select audience, Celia Silva (Candela Serrat), she loves letters, studied teaching and her dream is to continue studying, writing and seeing the world. Later she discovers that she feels a feeling of love for her friend Petra; and Elisa Silva (Carla Díaz), is the little sister, spoiled, irascible and immature, she dreams of finding a man of good position with whom she can start a family. The six sisters go from being upper-class women without any concern to running the textile factory and the businesses of their father, Don Fernando Silva, after his sudden death, in a society in which women have no right to vote.

== Cast ==
=== Protagonists ===
- María Castro as Doña Francisca Silva Torrealba de Gutiérrez, Condesa de Barnos
- Carla Díaz as Elisa Silva Torrealba
- Celia Freijeiro as Doña Adela Silva Torrealba Vda. de Sáez y Rivera
- Mariona Tena as Doña Blanca Silva Torrealba de Loygorri, Baronesa de Loygorri, Lady-in-waiting of Victoria Eugenie of Battenberg, the Queen consort of Spain
- Marta Larralde as Doña Diana Silva Torrealba de Montaner, Marquesa de Fuensanta
- Candela Serrat as Celia Silva Torrealba

=== Main cast ===
- Emilio Gutiérrez Caba as Don Fernando Silva Santos
- Fernando Andina as Rodolfo Loygorri del Amo
- Marta Torné as Victoria Villacieros
- Vicky Peña as Rosalía Manzano de Fuentes
- Kiti Mánver as Dolores del Amo Vda. de Loygorri
- María Hervás as Inés Villamagna
- Fernando Guillén Cuervo as Aurelio Buendía
- María Cotiello as Soledad Silva Guzmán/Úrsula Gorán/Úrsula Gorán de Gutiérrez
- Álex Gadea as Cristóbal Manuel Loygorri del Amo, Barón consorte de Loygorri
- Álex Adróver as Salvador Montaner, Marqués de Fuensanta
- Jorge Clemente as Carlos "Carlitos" Terán
- Juan Ribó as Don Ricardo Silva Santos
- Marta Fernández Muro as Adolfina Torrealba López
- Ricard Sales as Gabriel Gutiérrez Rivera, Conde de Barnos
- Oriol Tarrasón as Germán Rivera
- Nuncy Valcárcel as María de las Mercedes "Merceditas" Oviedo
- Joaquín Climent as Benjamín Fuentes
- Pep Antón Muñoz as Enrique Gutiérrez
- Llum Barrera as Antonia Rivera Vda. de Gutiérrez
- Carlota Olcina as Petra Fuentes Martínez
- Alejandro Cano as Miguel Esparza
- Cristóbal Suárez as Luis Civantos
- Raúl Fernández de Pablo as Bernardo Angulo
- Julia Molins as Sofía Álvarez de Terán
- Mario Alberto Díez as Basilio Ruiz
- Avelino González as Raimundo Ferreiro
- Eva Almaya as Marina Montero
- Daniel Muriel as Inspector Federico Velasco Doménech
- Leticia Etala as Bruna de Velasco
- Adrián Lamana as Ciro Altabás
- Eva Manjón as Amalia "La Cachetera" Jordán de Loygorri
- Ana Mayo as Beatriz Vinuesa
- Roger Coma as Emilio Sánchez
- Oriol Puig as Gonzalo Silva
- José Bustos as Simón Goris
- Luz Valdenebro as Aurora Alarcón Marco
- Alejandra Lorente as Carmela "Camelita" Silva Manzano/Carolina García/Carolina García Rivera/Carolina Silva Manzano de Rivera
- Marian Arahuetes as Catalina
- María Isasi as Elpidia

=== Participations ===
- Raúl Alberto Mediero Rodríguez as Factory Employee (Episodes 338-344)

== International broadcasting ==
- Vietnam - The series premiered on December 21, 2023, on VTV1 as Sáu chị em.

== See also ==
- Radiotelevisión Española
- Television in Spain
