= Éléonore Loiselle =

Canadian actress

Éléonore Loiselle (born February 27, 2001) is a Canadian actress from Laval, Quebec. She is most noted for her performances in the 2020 film Goddess of the Fireflies (La déesse des mouches à feu), for which she received a Prix Iris nomination for Best Supporting Actress at the 23rd Quebec Cinema Awards in 2021, and the 2021 film Wars, for which she won the award for Best Actress at the 2021 Karlovy Vary Film Festival.

She has also appeared in the television series Cerebrum and Meilleur avant, and the films The Far Shore (Dérive) and Social Hygiene (Hygiène sociale).
