= Marta Larralde =

Spanish actress

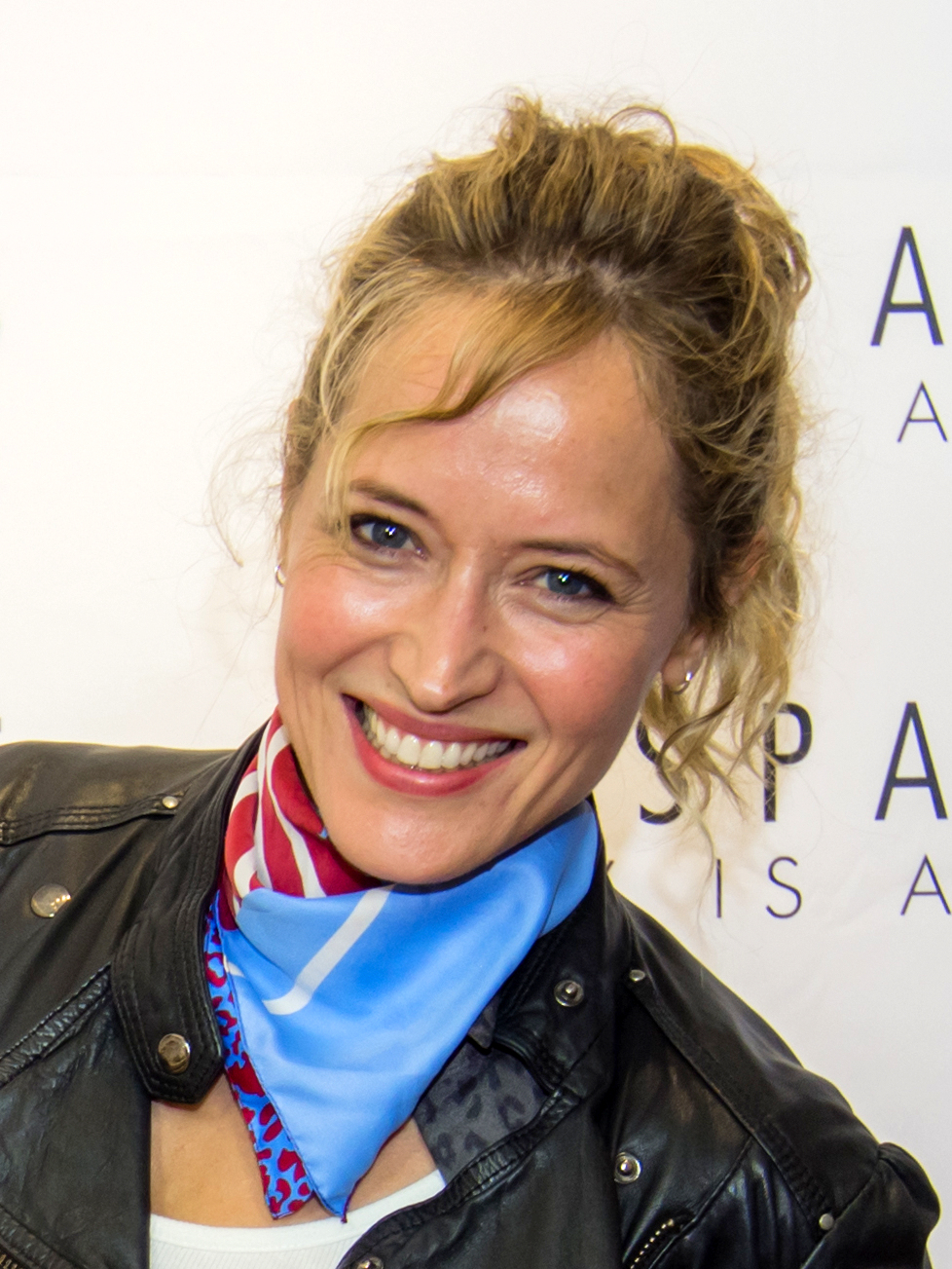
- Born: 22 April 1981 (age 44); Vigo, Spain
- Occupation: Actress

Marta Larralde (born 22 April 1981) is a Spanish actress from Galicia. She is known for her performances in series such as Gran Hotel and Seis hermanas.

== Biography ==
Born on 22 April 1981 in Vigo, Larralde took studies in Image and Sound in her native city before becoming a professional actress. She was also a member of the track and field section of Celta de Vigo. Larralde worked as assistant director for Fernando León de Aranoa in Mondays in the Sun (2002).

She made her feature film debut as an actress with a leading role in Gonzalo Tapia's Lena, released in 2001. In 2004, she starred in León and Olvido. More than 15 years later, she reprised the role of Olvido in Olvido and León, the sequel to León and Olvido.

== Filmography ==
Television

Year	Title	Role	Notes	Ref.
2006	Hospital Central	Luna	Main. Introduced in season 11	
2011–13	Gran Hotel	Belén	Main	
2015–17	Seis hermanas	Diana Silva	Main	
2018	Fariña (Cocaine Coast)	Nieves	Main	
2020	Vivir sin permiso (Unauthorized Living)	Judge Marina Cambeiro		
2020	Caronte	Natalia	Main	
2021	HIT	Francis	Main. Introduced in season 2	

Film

Year	Title	Role	Notes	Ref.
2001	Lena	Lena		
2003	Una preciosa puesta de sol	Beatriz		
2004	León y Olvido (León and Olvido)	Olvido		
2005	El penalti más largo del mundo (The Longest Penalty Shot in the World)	Cecilia		
2013	Todas las mujeres (All the Women)	Carmen		
2015	El apóstata (The Apostate)	Pilar		
2015	La playa de los ahogados (The Beach of the Drowned)	Alicia Castelo		
2020	Ofrenda a la tormenta (Offering to the Storm)	Yolanda Berrueta		
2021	Olvido y León (Olvido and León)	Olvido	Sequel to León y Olvido	

== Awards and nominations ==
Year	Award	Category	Work	Result	Ref.
2004	39th Karlovy Vary International Film Festival	Best Actress	León y Olvido	Won	
2012	10th Mestre Mateo Awards	Best Supporting Actress	Outro maís	Nominated	
2014	12th Mestre Mateo Awards	Best Supporting Actress	Gran Hotel	Nominated	
