= Best Actress Award (Karlovy Vary IFF) =

Film award category

The Best Actress Award is one of main awards of the Feature Film Competition at the Karlovy Vary International Film Festival. It is conferred on the best actress, or the best actresses ex aequo.

== Best Actress Award ==
Year	Actress	Film	Original Title	Nationality of the Actress
2025	Pia Tjelta	Don't Call Me Mama	Se meg	Norway
2021	Éléonore Loiselle	Wars	Guerres	Canadian
2020				
2019				
2018				
2017	Jowita Budnik (ex aequo)	Birds Are Singing in Kigali	Ptaki śpiewają w Kigali	Polish
2017	Eliane Umuhire (ex aequo)	Birds Are Singing in Kigali	Ptaki śpiewają w Kigali	Rwandan
2016	Zuzana Mauréry	The Teacher	Učitelka	Slovakian
2015	Alena Mihulová	Home Care	Domácí péče	Czech
2014	Elle Fanning	Low Down		United States
2013	Emily Meade (ex aequo)	Bluebird		United States
2013	Amy Morton (ex aequo)	Bluebird		United States
2013	Margo Martindale (ex aequo)	Bluebird		United States
2013	Louisa Krause (ex aequo)	Bluebird		United States
2012	Leila Hatami	The Last Step	Pele Akher	Iranian
2011	Stine Fischer Christensen	Cracks in the Shell	Die Unsichtbare	Danish
2010	Anaïs Demoustier	Sweet Evil	L'enfance du mal	French
2009	Paprika Steen	Applause	Applaus	Danish
2008	Martha Issová	Night Owls	Děti noci	Czech
2007	Elvira Mínguez	Pudor (Modesty)		Spanish
2006	Maggie Gyllenhaal	Sherrybaby		United States
2005	Krystyna Feldman	My Nikifor	Mój Nikifor	Polish
2004	Karen-Lise Mynster (ex aequo)	Aftermath	Lad de små børn	Danish
2004	Marta Larralde (ex aequo)	León and Olvido	León y Olvido	Spanish
2003	Giovanna Mezzogiorno (ex aequo)	Facing Windows	La Finestra di fronte	Italian
2003	Sylvie Testud (ex aequo)	Fear and Trembling	Stupeur et tremblements	French
2002	Ugla Egilsdóttir	The Seagull's Laughter	Mávahlátur	Icelandic
2001	Viveka Seldahl	A Song for Martin	En sång för Martin	Swedish
2000	Regina Casé	Me You Them	Et Tu Eles	Brazilian
1999	Evelyn Kaplun	Yana's Friends	החברים של יאנה (HaHaverim shel Yana)	Israeli
1998	Julia Stiles	Wicked		United States
1997	Lena Endre	Juloratoriet		Swedish
1996	Marisa Paredes	The Flower of My Secret	La Flor de mi secreto	Spanish
1995	Ya-lei Kuei	Maiden Rosé	女兒紅 (Nu er hong)	Taiwanese
1994	Natasha Richardson	Widows' Peak		British
1992	Evdokiya Germanova	Kiks	Кикс	Russian
1990	Julie Jézéquel	Tumultes		French
1990	Clotilde de Bayser	Tumultes		French
1990	Laure Marsac	Tumultes		French
1988	Corinna Harfouch	Die Schauspielerin (The Actress)		German
1986	Jane Fonda (ex aequo)	Agnes of God		United States
1986	Anne Bancroft (ex aequo)	Agnes of God		United States
1986	Meg Tilly (ex aequo)	Agnes of God		United States
1984	Susú Pecoraro (ex aequo)	Camila		Argentine
1984	Marie Colbin (ex aequo)	No Time for Tears: The Bachmeier Case		Austrian
1982	Not conferred			
1980	Anda Onesa (ex aequo)	Duios Anastasia trecea		Romanian
1980	Birgit Doll (ex aequo)	Geschichten aus dem Wienerwald		Austrian
1978	Marisol (ex aequo)	Los Días del pasado (The Days of The Past)		Spanish
1978	Marie-José Nat (ex aequo)	The Simple Past	Le Passé simple	French
1976	Hildegard Knef (ex aequo)	Everyone Dies Alone	Jeder stirbt für sich allein	German
1976	Karin Schröder (ex aequo)	Kalldorf gegen Mannesmann		German
1974	Marta Vančurová	Lovers in the Year One	Milenci v roce jedna	Czech
1972	Mari Törőcsik	Dead Landscape	Holt vidék	Hungarian
1970	Natalya Arinbasarova	By the Lake	У озера (U ozera)	Russian
1968	Carol White	Poor Cow		British
1966	Not conferred			
1964	Jeanne Moreau	Diary of a Chambermaid	Le journal d'une femme de chambre	French
1962	Not conferred			
1960	Mari Törőcsik	Our Kid	Kölyök	Hungarian
1958	Nargis	Mother India		Indian
1957	Tzvetana Arnaudova	Urok istorii	Урок истории	Russian
1956	Rufina Nifontova	Flames on the Volga	Вольница	Russian
1954	Rosaura Revueltas	Salt of the Earth		Mexican
1952	Milka Tuykova	Danka	Данка	Bulgarian
1951	Not conferred			
1950	Che Liang-sing	Zhao Yiman	赵一曼	Chinese
1949	Not conferred			
1948	Madeleine Robinson	Les Frères Bouquinquant		French
