= Paloma Pedrero =

Spanish actress, theatre director and playwright

Paloma Pedrero (born 3 July 1957 in Madrid) is a Spanish actress, theatre director and playwright.

== Life ==
Spanish playwright Paloma Pedrero studied Sociology at Madrid's Universidad Complutense before becoming involved in the reestablishment of Madrid's theater scene following the death of Franco as a member of the Cachivache theater group. Her first play, La llamada de Lauren, in which she also played the role of Rosa, was staged in 1985.

Since then she has written much more material, acted both on the stage and on television, and directed productions of her own works. She has also cultivated a prolific career as a conference speaker and essayist.

Paloma Pedrero won the 1987 Premio Tirso de Molina for Invierno de luna alegre.

== Work ==
Pedrero's plays are, for the most part, short quasi-comedies that explore questions of identity, the subversion of gender roles, and the nature of individual freedom in postmodern society, based around a neorealist model.

Her typical plot is structured simply (many works have only one scene) and the timeframe is seldom of any extended duration. The scenes dramatized are ones of daily life and the characters are reasonably familiar; they are, Pedrero writes in her monograph Sobre mi teatro, "historias que nacen de mi experiencia en algunos casos y de la observación en otros" ("stories that arise from my own experiences in some cases and from observation on others"). This succinct, extremely focused writing style and realistic treatment of plot structure are exemplified by the series of one-act plays that make up Noches de amor efímero; each dramatizes a brief nighttime encounter between a man and a woman as a result of which their lives are profoundly changed. The action takes place in real time over the course of the few minutes that each play takes to stage.

Pedrero's settings are everyday locations, predominantly urban and always familiar, whether the apartment of La llamada de Lauren, the metro station of Solos esta noche or the park of La noche que ilumina. "Busco, generalmente, escenarios simples" ("I generally look for simple settings"), writes Pedrero, "me gusta la calle, los parques, los bares, los metros, las habitaciones del hotel, las estaciones... escenarios teatrales que no necesitan de grandes aparatos ni parafenalias" ("I like the street, parks, bars, the metro, hotel rooms, stations... dramatic settings that don't need complex apparatus or paraphernalia"). Though settings often have important symbolic impact within each play (for instance, the enclosed, limited space of the apartment in La llamada de Lauren is starkly contrasted with the freedom of the carnival going on in the street outside) they are inevitably handled in a realist aesthetic.

== Major works ==
- La llamada de Lauren (1984)
- Resguardo personal (1985)
- Invierno de luna alegre (1985)
- Besos de lobo (1986)
- El color de agosto (1987)
- Las fresas mágicas (1988)
- La isla amarilla (1988)
- Noches de amor efímero (1989)
- Una estrella (1990)
- De la noche al alba (1992)
- Aliento de equilibrista (1993)
- El pasamanos (1994)
- Locas de amar (1994)
- La noche que ilumina (1995)
- Cachorros de negro mirar (1995)

List from:
