= Mario Gas =

Spanish actor

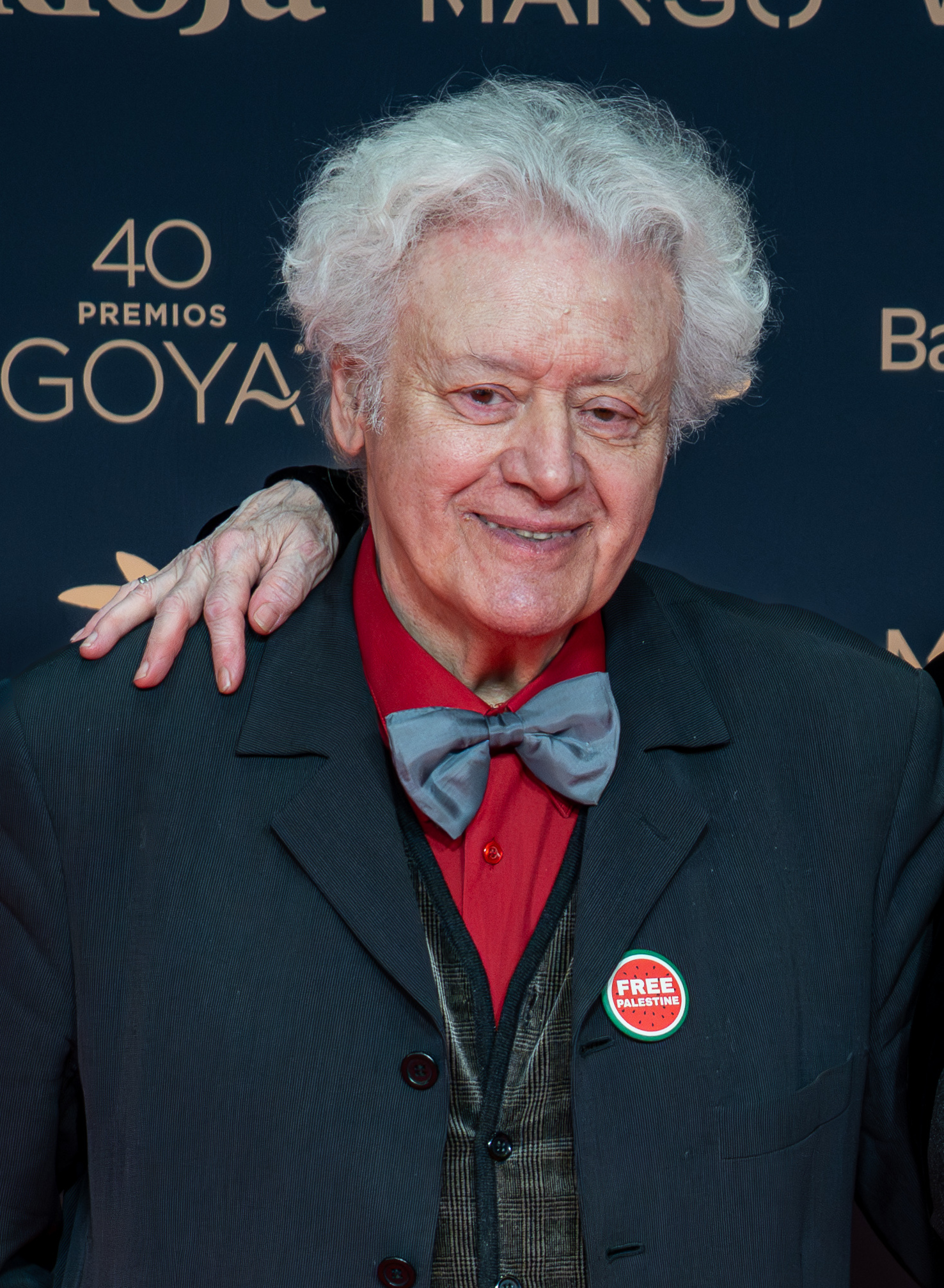
- Gas in 2026
- Born: Mario Gas Cabré; February 15, 1947 (age 79); Montevideo, Uruguay
- Occupations: Actor, voice actor, film director and theater director
- Spouse: Vicky Peña
- Children: 2, including Miranda

Mario Gas Cabré is a Spanish actor and director. and winner of a Goya Award.

Born in Montevideo, Uruguay, on February 5, 1947, while his actor parents were on tour he has Uruguayan citizenship. He is one of the most important figures of the performing arts of Spain and began his acting career in University and took it up seriously after he failed to complete the law course he was enrolled in.

== Family ==
He comes from a large acting family. His father, Manuel Gas, was a singer and actor. His mother, Anna Cabré, (sister of actor Mario Cabré), was a dancer. His daughter Miranda Gas is also a well known Spanish actress.

He is married to theatrical actress Vicky Peña, and they have two children, Orestes and Miranda Gas.

== Career ==
Mario Gas, has directed more than fifty plays. He was also a stage Director of Opera productions like La Traviata and Un ballo in maschera by Giuseppe Verdi; Madama Butterfly by Giacomo Puccini and L'elisir d'amore by Gaetano Donizetti.

As a film actor, he has been involved in more than thirty films, with some directors such as Jaime Camino, Vicente Aranda, Bigas Luna, Luis García Berlanga, Félix Rotaeta, Ventura Pons and Josep Maria Forn. He has also done voiceover work for actors such as Ben Kingsley, John Malkovich and Geoffrey Rush.

In 1996, he was awarded the Premi Nacional de Teatre de Catalunya, by the Generalitat de Catalunya, for his theatrical production of Sweeney Todd. In 1998, he was awarded a Ciutat of Barcelona in the performing arts for his productions of Guys and Dolls and La reina de bellesa de Leenane.

In 2004, he was appointed director of the Teatro Español in Madrid. In September 2006, he was involved in a controversy over a performance. At the time, Gas had the backing of number of people in the world of culture. He left his post as director of the Teatro Español in 2012.

== Theater Work ==
- 2012: Follies, producción del Teatro Español.
- 2011: Un tranvía llamado Deseo, producción del Teatro Español.
- 2011: Un frágil equilibrio, de Edward Albee.
- 2008: Las troyanas, co-producción de Festival de Mérida y Teatro Español. Versión del texto original de Eurípides, escrita por Ramón Irigoyen.
- 2008: Sweeney Todd (reposición), Teatro Español.
- 2007: Ascensión y caída de la ciudad de Mahagonny, de Bertolt Brecht.
- 2007: Homebody/Kabul, de Tony Kushner.
- 2005: A Electra le sienta bien el luto, de Eugene O'Neill.
- 2003: Zona zero, de Neil LaBute.
- 2002: El sueño de un hombre ridículo, de Fiodor Dostoievski.
- 2002: Las criadas, de Jean Genet.
- 2001: La Mare Coratge i els seus fills, de Bertolt Brecht. TNC
- 2001: Lulú, de Frank Wedekind. TNC
- 2001: The Full Monty, de Terrence McNally y David Yazbek. Teatre Novedades.
- 2000: Top Dogs, de Urs Widmer.
- 2000: A little night music, de Hugh Wheeler y Stephen Sondheim. Teatre Grec.
- 2000: Olors, de Josep Maria Benet i Jornet, TNC
- 1999: La habitación azul, de David Hare. 1999
- 1998: Guys & Dolls, de Loesser/Swerling/Burrows, Teatre Nacional de Catalunya.
- 1998: Master Class, de Terrence McNally. Teatro Marquina de Madrid.
- 1998: La reina de la bellesa de Leenane, de Martin McDonagh. La Perla Lila i Bitó Produccions. Teatre Villarroel.
- 1995: Sweeney Todd, de Hugh Wheeler y Stephen Sondheim. CDGC/Teatre Poliorama.
- 1995: La gata sobre el tejado de zinc, de Tennessee Williams. Teatro Principal de Valencia.
- 1995: Martes de Carnaval, de Ramón María del Valle-Inclán. Centro Dramático Nacional.
- 1994: Otelo de William Shakespeare. Festival Grec '94
- 1993: Golfus de Roma, de Stephen Sondheim. Festival de Teatro Clásico de Mérida.
- 1992: El tiempo y los Conway, de J.B. Priestley. Teatre Condal
- 1986: La Ronda, de Arthur Schnitzler. CDGC/Teatre Romea
- 1984: L'ópera de tres rals, de Bertolt Brecht y Kurt Weill. Centre Dramàtic de la Generalitat de Catalunya/Teatro Romea de Barcelona.
- 1968: El adefesio, de Rafael Alberti.

== Filmography ==
- El coronel Macià (2006) de Josep Maria Forn.
- Dispersión de la luz (2006) Javier Aguirre.
- La puta y la ballena (2004) de Luis Puenzo.
- Adela (2000) de Eduardo Mignogna.
- Amigo/Amado (2000) de Ventura Pons.
- Adela (2000 film)
- The Pianist (1998 film)
- El largo invierno (1992) de Jaime Camino.
- Cambio de sexo (1977) de Vicente Aranda.
