= Carla Díaz =

Spanish actress and dancer

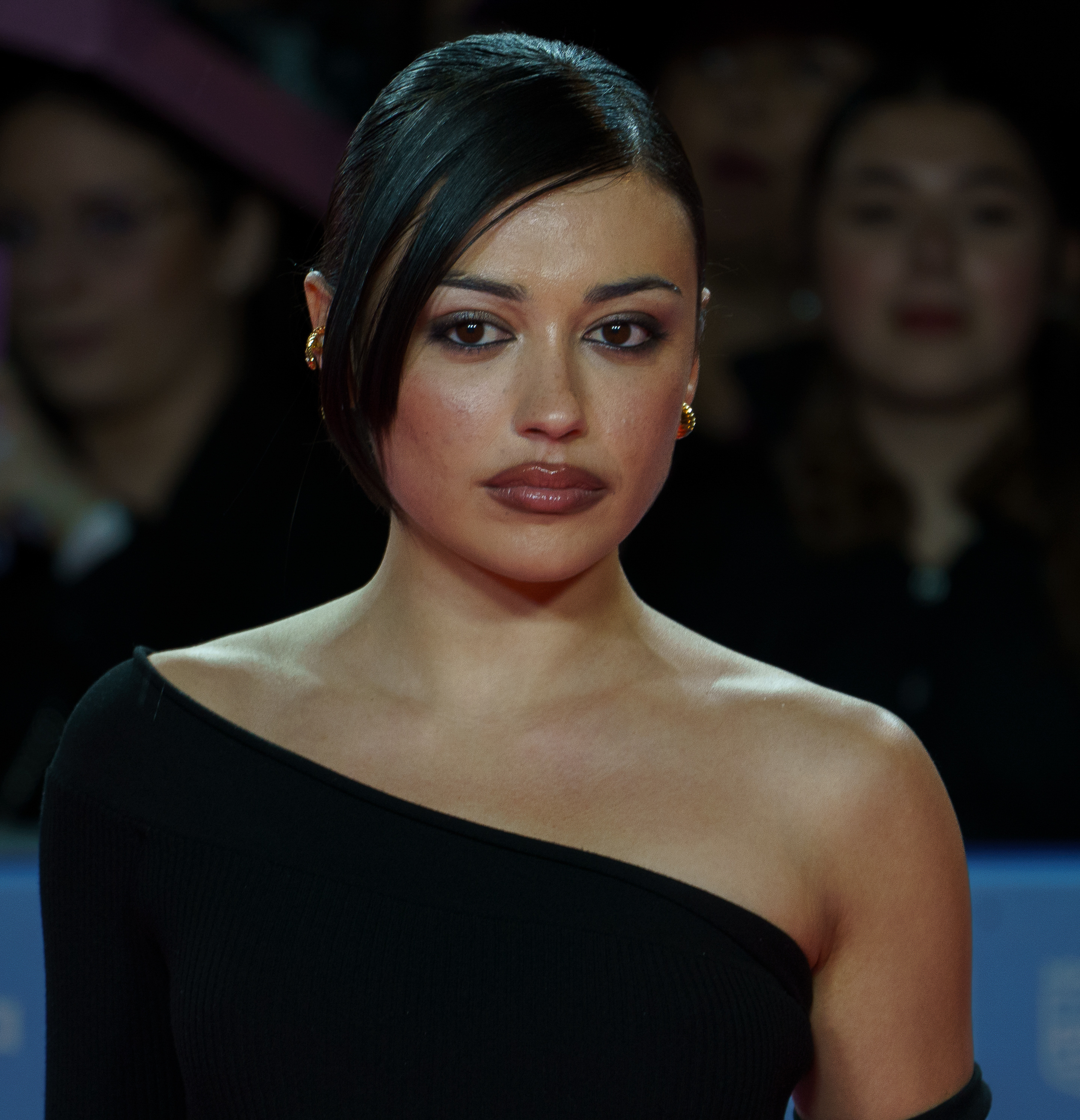
- Díaz in 2025
- Born: 19 July 1998 (age 28); Madrid, Spain
- Occupations: Actress; dancer
- Years active: 2009–present

Carla Díaz (born 19 July 1998) is a Spanish actress and dancer. She is known for her performances in Tierra de lobos, El Príncipe and Seis hermanas.

== Biography ==
Díaz was born in Madrid on 19 July 1998. Her parents operate a dance school which sparked her interest in dance from an early age. In 2007, at the age of nine, Díaz began her acting career in advertising, performing in a number of TV commercials. She landed her first major television role as Patricia Rozas in the mystery series Punta Escarlata, released in 2011. She also starred as the youngest of the four Lobo sisters in Tierra de lobos (2010–2014), as the youngest of the Ben Barek siblings in El Príncipe (2014–2016) and as the youngest of the six Silva sisters in Seis hermanas (2015–2017). In July 2020, she joined the cast of the fourth season of the teen drama series Elite, portraying Ari.

She also featured in Nele Mueller-Stöfen's directorial debut film Delicious, selected for premiering in the Panorama section of the 75th Berlin International Film Festival on 18 February 2025.

== Filmography ==
Television

Year	Title	Role	Notes	Ref.
2009	El internado	Young Lucía	Episodic role	
2010	Aída	Camboria	Episodic role	
2010	Águila Roja	Margarita (child)	Episodic role	
2010–14	Tierra de lobos	Rosa "Rosita" Lobo	Main	
2011	Punta Escarlata	Patricia Rozas	Main	
2012	Carmina	Carmina Ordoñez (child)	TV movie aired as 2-episode miniseries	
2014	Hermanos	Marta	TV miniseries	
2014–16	El Príncipe	Nayat Ben Barek	Main	
2015–17	Seis hermanas	Elisa Silva	Main	
2015	Teresa	Teresa (current day)	TV movie	
2018	Amar es para siempre	Ana Belén Tuñón de Guevara Robles	Recurring; Introduced in season 6	
2018	Paquita Salas	Waiter	Guest role; 1 episode	
2019	La caza. Monteperdido	Ana Montrell	Main	
2020	Madres. Amor y vida	Elsa	Recurring	
2021–2022	Élite (Elite)	Ariadna "Ari" Blanco Commerford	Main (seasons 4–6)	
2021	Elite Short Stories: Patrick	Ariadna Blanco Commerford	Main; 3 episodes	
2023	La mesías	Lara	Guest role; 1 episode	
2025	La Ruta	Vicky	Main (season 2)	

Film

Year	Title	Role	Notes	Ref.
2022	Mañana es hoy (Tomorrow Is Today)	Lucía		
2025	Delicious	Teodora		
2025	8			
