= Miranda Gas =

Spanish actress (born 1985)

Miranda Gas (born 1985) is a Spanish actress known for her work in Living Is Easy with Eyes Closed (2013), VI premis Barcelona de cinema (2007) and IV premios Max de las artes escénicas (2001).

== Biography ==
Miranda Gas was born in Madrid, although she grew up in Barcelona. She began to be interested in dance, while at school and once finished high school, studied under Anna Maleras. In the year 2000, she performed in the musical "Little night music", directed by her father Mario Gas, at the Grec Festival and, subsequently, at the Teatro Albéniz in Madrid. Miranda Gas is lead singer of Xazzar, a Balkan folk style that started in 2005. The group has recorded two albums and has received the Sona 9 award, organized by Television of Catalonia, Catalunya Radio and the magazine Enderrock (readers chose the group as the best direct folk of 2007).

== Filmography ==
- Living Is Easy with Eyes Closed (2013),
- VI premis Barcelona de cinema (2007)
- IV premios Max de las artes escénicas (2001).2000-2001) Plays Fredrika Armfeldt in "A Little Night Music", by Stephen Sondheim and Hugh Wheeler. Dir. Mario Gas.
- (2004) Special Performance of "Monólogos de la vagina", by Eve Ensler.
- (2009) Special Performance of "La nit més clara", by Clara Peya and Amadeu Bergés.
- (2009) Plays Srta. Mon in "Groucho me enseñó su camiseta", by Manuel Vázquez Montalbán and Damià Barbany. Dir. Damià Barbany.
- (2009) Play: "En viu", by Anna Maleras.
- (2009) Tribute: "Homenaje a Manuel Gas". Dir. Mario Gas.
- (2010) Plays Magda in "Rock 'n' Roll", by Tom Stoppard. Dir. Àlex Rigola.
- (2010–2011) Plays Dama visitante/La reina María Antonieta in "Beaumarchais", by Sacha Guitry. Dir. Josep Maria Flotats.
- (2011) Plays La donzella in "El comte Arnau", by Joan Maragall. Dir. Hermann Bonnín.
- (2012) Plays María in "Orquesta Club Virginia", by Manuel Iborra. Dir. Manuel Iborra.
- (2012) Plays Dama 1 in "En la vida todo es verdad y todo es mentira", by Pedro Calderón de la Barca. Dir. Ernesto Caballero.
- (2012) Benefit Gala: "No esteu sols!".
- (2012) Plays Pepita Troya in "Doña Perfecta", by Benito Pérez Galdós. Dir. Ernesto Caballero.
- (2013–2014) Plays Rain/Gloria in "Maridos y mujeres", by Woody Allen. Dir. Àlex Rigola.
- (2014) Play: "Los nadadores nocturnos", by José Manuel Mora. Dir. Carlota Ferrer.

== Family ==
She is from an acting family. He is the daughter of Mario Gas and Vicky Peña, herself the daughter of Catalan actors Montserrat Carulla and Felip Peña.
