= Marta Torné =

Spanish actress and presenter (born 1978)

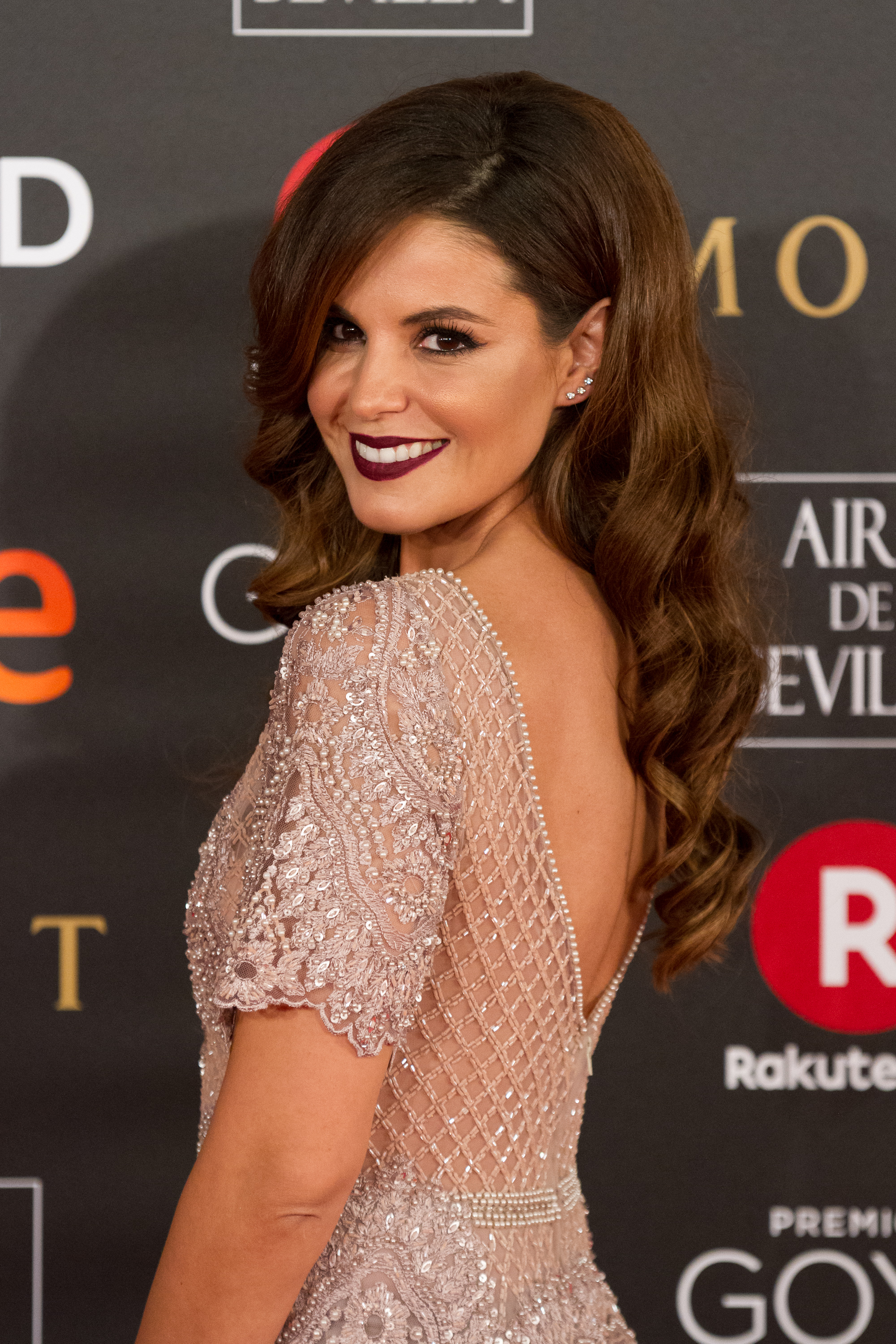
- Torné at the 32nd Goya Awards in 2018
- Born: Marta Torné Gracia; 10 March 1978 (age 47); Barcelona, Spain

Marta Torné Gracia (Barcelona, Spain, 10 March 1978) is a Spanish actress and presenter.

When Torné finished C.O.U., she went to work as a receptionist at a production company. She decided to study audiovisual and radio production so she could get higher-level jobs at the company where she worked. After completing her studies, she worked in various radio stations such as Radio Estel, Ràdio Nova, Flaix FM and RAC 1.

Her focus on the small screen resulted from her being chosen to star in one of Spain's biggest television hits in recent years, El Internado in Antena 3. In this series she appeared with other popular, established Spanish actors such as Amparo Baró and Luis Merlo and a group of young actors including Ana de Armas, Blanca Suarez, and Yon Gonzalez. In the series Torné played the role of the maid Maria Almagro.

On 3 March 2010, Torné debut as a stage actress in the play "Más allá del puente".

In December 2010 she was the host of the talk-show Algo pasa con Marta in La Sexta, that only lasted two weeks. She is expected to be in the cast of the Spanish series Los protegidos in autumn 2011.

Since 2022 she has been the presenter of the Catalan singing competition Eufòria, produced by TV3. She is supported by Miki Núñez, who interviews the contestants behind the scenes, after their performances.

In September 2004, she was on the cover of FHM magazine in its Spanish edition.
