= 2022 in Spanish television =

This is a list of Spanish television related events in 2022.

== Events ==
- 29 March – Rodrigo Vázquez is announced as the new host of El cazador after Ion Aramendi leaves Televisión Española to sign with Telecinco.
- 8 April – TV channel Elias Vamos por Movistar Plus+ starts broadcasting.
- 20 April – Borja Prado is appointed chairman of Mediaset España.
- 14 May – Chanel, performing the song "SloMo", represents Spain at the Eurovision Song Contest 2022, ranking third.
- 22 June – Spanish Parliament passes Law 13/2022, regarding Audiovisual Media Services.
- 7 July – MFE - MediaForEurope, italian Company belonging to Silvio Berlusconi, increases its share capital on Mediaset España up to 82.92%.
- 27 September – Elena Sánchez Caballero is appointed interim President of RTVE.
- 17 October – It is revealed that Paolo Vasile will cease as CEO of Mediaset España after 23 years in office.
- 31 December –
  - TV channel Fibracat TV ends broadcasting.
  - TV channel Canal Panda ends rebroadcasting.

== Debuts ==
Title	Channel	Debut	Performers/Host	Genre
Señor, dame paciencia	Atresplayer	2022-01-02	Félix Gómez	Sitcom
Lies and Deceit	Antena 3	2022-01-12	Javier Rey	Drama Series
Express	Starzplay	2022-01-16	Maggie Civantos	Drama Series
La noche de los cazadores	La 1	2022-01-17	Ion Aramendi	Game Show
Sequía	La 1	2022-01-18	Elena Rivera	Drama Series
Caza herederos	La Sexta	2022-01-18	Jalis de la Serna	Variety Show
Las claves del siglo XXI	La 1	2022-01-21	Javier Ruiz	News Show
Feria: The Darkest Light	Netflix	2022-01-28	Carla Campra	Drama Series
Todos mienten	Movistar+	2022-02-28	Irene Arcos and Natalia Verbeke	Drama Series
Wrong Side of the Tracks	Telecinco	2022-02-01	José Coronado	Drama Series
Montealto: Regreso a la casa	Telecinco	2022-02-01	Rocío Carrasco and Jorge Javier Vázquez	Reality Show
Las tres puertas	La 1	2022-02-02	María Casado	Talk Show
Real Madrid, la leyenda blanca	Prime Video	2022-02-11		Documentary
Operación Marea Negra	Prime Video	2022-02-25	Álex González	Drama Series
La edad de la ira	Atresplayer	2022-02-27	Manu Ríos	Drama Series
Menudos Torres	La 1	2022-02-28	Hermanos Torres	Cooking Show
Encuentros inesperados	La Sexta	2022-03-10	Mamen Mendizábal	Talk Show
Once Upon a Time... Happily Never After	Netflix	2022-03-11	Asier Etxeandia	Sitcom
Cinco tenedores	Movistar+	2022-03-27	Juanma Castaño and Miki Nadal	Cooking Show
En boca de todos	Cuatro	2022-03-28	Diego Losada	Variety Show
Baila conmigo	Cuatro	2022-03-30	Nagore Robles	Dating Show
Heirs to the Land	Netflix	2022-04-15	Yon González	Drama Series
Heridas	Atresmedia	2022-04-17	Adriana Ugarte	Drama Series
Sentimos las molestias	Movistar+	2022-04-08	Antonio Resines and Miguel Rellán	Sitcom
Los pilares del tiempo.	La 2	2022-04-21	Lidia San José and Leonor Martín	Documentary
Martínez y Hermanos	Movistar+	2022-04-21	Dani Martínez	Talk Show
When You Least Expect It	Prime Video	2022-04-22	Blanca Portillo	Drama Series
Plano general	La 2	2022-04-22	Jenaro Castro	Talk show
Historias de protegidos	Atresplayer	2022-04-24	Ana Fernández García	Drama Series
Enred@d@s	La 1	2022-04-27	María Gómez and Sara Escudero	Variety Show
Los miedos de...	Cuatro	2022-04-30		Reality Show
Déjate querer	Telecinco	2022-05-06	Toñi Moreno	Reality Show
Welcome to Eden	Netflix	2022-05-06	Amaia Salamanca	Drama Series
Mundo Brasero	Antena 3	2022-05-08	Roberto Brasero	Variety Show
Futura	Cuatro	2022-05-17	Carmen Porter	Variety Show
Rapa	Movistar+	2022-05-19	Javier Cámara	Drama Series
Los Borbones: una familia real	Atresplayer	2022-05-31	Ana Pastor	Documentary
Intimacy	Netflix	2022-06-10	Verónica Echegui	Drama Series
Boundless	Prime Video	2022-06-10	Rodrigo Santoro	Drama Series
En el nombre de Rocío	Telecinco	2022-06-16	Rocío Carrasco	Reality Show
Nadie sabe nada	HBO Max	2022-06-18	Andreu Buenafuente and Berto Romero	Comedy
Mediafest Night Fever	Telecinco	2022-06-22	Jorge Javier Vázquez and Adela González	Talent Show
La reina del pueblo	Atresplayer	2022-06-27	Lucía Caraballo	Drama Series
Dos años y un día	Atresplayer	2022-07-03	Arturo Valls	Sitcom
Te ha tocado	La 1	2022-07-04	Raúl Gómez	Quiz Show
The Longest Night	Netflix	2022-07-08	Luis Callejo	Drama Series
Esta noche gano yo	Telecinco	2022-07-26	Christian Gálvez and Carolina Cerezuela	Quiz Show
Fanático	Netflix	2022-07-29	Lorenzo Ferro	Drama Series
Ya es verano	Telecinco	2022-07-30	Fran Blanco	Variety Show
Mapi	La 1	2022-08-01	Jandro	Quiz Show
La marquesa	Netflix	2022-08-04	Tamara Falcó	Reality Show
The Girl in the Mirror	Netflix	2022-08-18	Mireia Oriol	Drama Series
Tú no eres especial	Netflix	2022-09-02	Dèlia Brufau	Sitcom
Pesadilla en El Paraíso	Telecinco	2022-09-08	Lara Álvarez	Reality Show
Historias de UPA Next	La 1	2022-09-11	Mónica Cruz	Drama Series
Hablando claro	La 1	2022-09-12	Lourdes Maldonado	Variety Show
A Private Affair	Prime Video	2022-09-16	Aura Garrido and Jean Reno	Drama Series
Aruser@s Weekend	La 1	2022-09-17	Alfonso Arús	Variety Show
Los protegidos: El regreso	Atresplayer	2022-09-19	Antonio Garrido	Drama Series
The Girls at the Back	Netflix	2022-09-23	Itsaso Arana	Drama Series
La gran confusión	La 1	2022-09-24	Javier Sardà	Talk Show
The Gypsy Bride	Atresplayer	2022-09-25	Nerea Barros	Drama Series
Dúos increíbles	La 1	2022-09-29	Juan y Medio	Talent Show
Offworld	Movistar+	2022-09-29	Luis Callejo	Drama Series
¡Fiesta!	Telecinco	2022-10-01	Emma García	Variety Show
Cuaderno de campo	La 2	2022-10-02	Juan Antonio Rodríguez	Documentary
El comodín de La 1	La 1	2022-10-03	Aitor Albizua	Quiz Show
Joaquín, el novato	Antena 3	2022-10-05	Joaquín	Talk Show
¿Quién es mi padre?	Telecinco	2022-10-08	Carlota Corredera	Reality Show
Encuentros	La 2	2022-10-13	Elena Sánchez and Jesús Marchamalo	Talk Show
Un país para leerlo	La 2	2022-10-14	Mario Obrero	Documentary
Holy Family	Netflix	2022-10-14	Najwa Nimri, Alba Flores, Macarena Gómez and Álex García	Drama Series
La Sexta Xplica	LaSexta	2022-10-15	José Yélamo	Talk Show
Culturas 2	La 2	2022-10-17	Paula Sainz-Pardo	Culture
Y ahora Sonsoles	Antena 3	2022-10-24	Sonsoles Ónega	Variety Show
El Inmortal. Gangs of Madrid	Movistar+	2022-10-27	Álex García	Drama Series
Si lo hubiera sabido	Netflix	2022-10-28	Megan Montaner	Drama Series
¡García!.	HBO	2022-10-28	Veki Velilla and Francisco Ortiz	Drama Series
The Route (TV series)	Atresplayer	2022-11-25	Àlex Monner	Drama Series
No me gusta conducir	TNT	2022-11-25	Juan Diego Botto	Drama Series
Fácil	TNT	2022-12-01	Natalia de Molina	Drama Series
Smiley	Netflix	2022-12-07	Carlos Cuevas and Miki Esparbé	Drama Series
Para toda la vida	Telecinco	2022-12-12	Jesús Vázquez	Dating Show
Our Only Chance	Disney+	2022-12-12	Aitana Ocaña	Drama Series
El chófer de Ruiz-Mateos.	Cuatro	2022-12-12		Documentary
Fuerza de paz	La 1	2022-12-14	Silvia Alonso, Martiño Rivas and Félix Gómez	Drama Series
Reacción en cadena	Telecinco	2022-12-19	Ion Aramendi	Quiz Show
25 palabras	Telecinco	2022-12-19	Christian Gálvez	Quiz Show
UPA Next	Atresplayer	2022-12-25	Mónica Cruz, Beatriz Luengo and Miguel Ángel Muñoz	Drama Series
Alpha Males	Netflix	2022-12-30	Fernando Gil	Sitcom

== Television shows ==
- La 1
  - Telediario (1957– )
  - Informe Semanal (1973– )
  - Telepasión española (1990– )
  - Cine de barrio (1995– )
  - Corazón (1997– )
  - Cuéntame cómo pasó (2001– )
  - Comando actualidad (2008– )
  - Españoles en el mundo (2009 – )
  - Audiencia abierta (2012– )
  - Flash Moda (2012– )
  - MasterChef (2013– )
  - MasterChef Junior (2013– )
  - Viaje al centro de la tele (2013– )
  - Aquí la Tierra (2014– )
  - MasterChef Celebrity (2016– )
  - Servir y proteger (2017–2023)
  - Maestros de la costura (2018– )
  - Lazos de sangre (2018– )
  - La Caza (2019– )
  - HIT (2020– )
  - Hora de La 1, La (2020– )
  - Cazador, El (2020– )
- Telecinco
  - Informativos Telecinco (1990– )
  - Survivor Spain (2000– )
  - El Programa de Ana Rosa (2005– )
  - Survivor Spain (2006– )
  - La que se avecina (2007– )
  - Sálvame (2009– )
  - Deluxe (2009– )
  - Got Talent España (2016– )
  - Mi casa es la tuya (2016– )
  - Socialité (2017– )
  - Ya es mediodía (2018– )
  - Idol Kids (2020– ¿?)
  - Isla de las tentaciones, Las (2020– )
  - Madres. Amor y vida (2020– )
  - El pueblo (2020– )
  - Secret Story: La casa de los secretos (2021– )
- La 2
  - Al filo de lo imposble (1982– )
  - Pueblo de Dios (1982– )
  - Últimas preguntas (1983– )
  - En portada (1984– )
  - Metrópolis (1985– )
  - Documentos TV (1986– )
  - Tendido cero (1986– )
  - Días de cine (1991– )
  - La Aventura del saber (1992– )
  - Jara y sedal (1992– )
  - La noche temática, (1995– )
  - Agrosfera (1997– )
  - El escarabajo verde (1997– )
  - Saber y ganar (1997– )
  - El Cine de La 2 (1998– )
  - Versión española (1998– )
  - Aquí hay trabajo (2000– )
  - Shalom (2003– )
  - Cámara abierta 2.0 (2007– )
  - Página 2 (2007– )
  - En lengua de signos (2008– )
  - Zoom tendencias ( 2008– )
  - Fábrica de ideas (2008–2017)
  - RTVE responde (2009– )
  - Imprescindibles (2010– )
  - Para todos la Dos (2010– )
  - Cómo nos reímos (2012– )
  - ¡Atención obras! (2013– )
  - Cachitos de hierro y cromo (2013– )
  - Órbita Laika (2014–)
  - 80 cm (2015–)
  - El cazador de cerebros (2015– )
  - Historia de nuestro cine (2015– )
  - Medina (2016– )
  - País mágico, Un (2017– )
  - ¡Qué animal! (2017– )
  - Ruralitas (2020– )
  - Tesoros de la tele (2020– )
  - El condensador de fluzo (2021– )
  - La matemática del espejo (2021– )
  - Un país para reírlo (2021– )
  - Rutas bizarras (2021– )
- Antena 3
  - Antena 3 Noticias (1990– )
  - Espejo público (1996– )
  - La ruleta de la fortuna (2006– )
  - Karlos Arguiñano en tu cocina (2010– )
  - Tu cara me suena (2011– )
  - El Hormiguero (2011– )
  - Centímetros cúblicos (2012– )
  - Amar es para siempre (2013– )
  - La Voz (2019– )
  - La Voz Kids (2019– )
  - La Voz Senior (2019– )
  - Mask Singer (2020– )
  - El desafío (2021– )
  - Veo cómo cantas (2021– )
- La Sexta
  - El Intermedio (2006– )
  - La Sexta Noticias (2006– )
  - Salvados (2008– )
  - Al rojo vivo (2011– )
  - La Sexta columna (2012– )
  - Más vale tarde (2012– )
  - Equipo de investigación (2013– )
  - Jugones (2013– )
  - Zapeando (2013– )
  - El jefe infiltrado (2014– )
  - ¿Te lo vas a comer? (2018– )
  - Arusitys (2018– )
  - La Sexta clave (2020– )
  - Lo de Évole (2020– )
  - Fuera del mapa (2021– )
  - Palo y astilla (2021– )
  - La Roca (2021– )
- Cuatro
  - Cuarto milenio (2005– )
  - Planeta Calleja (2014– )
  - Volando voy (2015– )
  - First Dates (2016– )
  - Viajeros Cuatro (2018 – )
  - Cuatro al día (2019– )
  - Todo es mentira (2019– )
  - First Dates: Crucero (2020– )
  - Iumiuky (2020– )
- Clan
  - Pocoyo (2005– )

== Ending this year ==
- La 1
  - España Directo (2005–2022)
  - La noche D (2021–2022)
  - Mejor contigo (2021–2022)
  - Two Lives (2021–2022)
- La 2
  - Un país en danza (2021-22)
- Antena 3
  - ¡Boom! (2014–2022)
  - La Voz Senior (2019–2022)
- Cuatro
  - En el punto de mira (2016–2022)
  - Alta Tensión (2021–2022)
  - Todo es verdad (2021–2022)
- Telecinco
  - Viva la vida (2017–2022)
  - Mujeres al poder (2019–2022)
  - Ya son las ocho (2021–2022)
- La Sexta
  - La Sexta Noche (2013–2022)
  - El objetivo (2013–2022)

== Deaths ==
- 14 January – Carmen de la Maza, actress, 81.
- 16 January – Ivanka Marfil, secretary in Un, dos, tres... responda otra vez, 59.
- 26 January – Arturo Arribas, actor, 56.
- 9 February – Alicia Hermida, actress, 99.
- 11 February – Isabel Torres, actress, 52.
- 24 March – María Fernanda D'Ocón, actress, 84.
- 3 April – Silvia Gambino, actress, 57.
- 6 April – Pilar Sanjurjo, meteorogist, 79.
- 7 April – José Luis Fradejas, host, 71.
- 28 April – Juan Diego, actor, 79.
- 10 May – Jesús Mariñas, journalist, 79.
- 12 June – Miryam Romero, journalist, 59.
- 22 June – José Luis Balbín, journalist, 81.
- 24 July – Berta Riaza, actress, 94.
- 25 July – Pedro Valentín, actor, 81.
- 6 August – Mario Beut, host, 89.
- 1 October – Àngel Casas, host, 76.
- 3 October – Jesús Quintero, host, 82.
- 9 October – Francisco Merino, actor, 91.
- 17 October – Claudio Biern Boyd, producer and cartoonist, 81.
- 19 November – Santiago Vázquez, host, 91.
- 30 December – Pepa Palau, 84. Actress and presenter

== See also ==
- 2022 in Spain
- List of Spanish films of 2022
