= 2017 in Spanish television =

This is a list of Spanish television related events from 2017.

== Events ==
- 27 February - TV channel 40 TV stops broadcasting, replacing the +Musica channel.
- 13 May – Manel Navarro and his song Do It for Your Lover scored 5 points at the Eurovision Song Contest 2017 in Kyiv, being ranked last.

== Debuts ==
Title	Channel	Debut	Performers/Host	Genre
Tu, yo y mi avatar	Cuatro	2017-09-01	Luján Argüelles.	Dating Show
Pulsaciones	Antena 3	2017-01-10	Leonor Watling	Drama Series
Tú sí que sí	La Sexta	2017-01-10	Cristina Pedroche	Talent Show
El final del camino	La 1	2017-01-11	Antonio Velázquez	Drama Series
Desnúdame	Dkiss	2017-01-15		Dating Show
Sé quién eres	Telecinco	2017-01-16	Blanca Portillo	Drama Series
Crónica Cuatro	Cuatro	2017-01-23	Ane Ibárzabal	News Magazine
El gran reto musical	La 1	2017-01-23	Eva González	Music
Queens: The Virgin and the Martyr	La 1	2017-01-24	Olivia Chenery	Drama Series
The Gaming House	Movistar+	2017-01-22	Cristinini	Sport
Este hotel es un infierno	DMax	2017-02-24	Enrique Sarasola	Docureality
Dani & Flo	Cuatro	2017-02-27	Dani Martínez and Florentino Fernández	Comedy
El golazo de Gol	Gol	2017-02-27	Manolo Lama	sport
iFamily	La 1	2017-03-07	Antonio Resines and Raúl Fernández	Sitcom
Tu cara no me suena todavía	Antena 3	2017-03-10	Manel Fuentes	Talent Show
Jugando con las estrellas	La 1	2017-03-11	Jaime Cantizano	Game Show
El árbol de los deseos	La 1	2017-03-11	Edu Soto	Variety Show
El Acabose	La 1	2017-03-15	José Mota	Comedy
Cazadores de trolls	La Sexta	2017-03-28	Pedro García Aguado	Docureality
El árbol de tu vida	Antena 3	2017-03-29	Toñi Moreno	Variety Show
Malas compañías	La Sexta	2017-04-09	Cristina Pardo	Investigation
Gym Tony LC	Cuatro	2017-04-17	Mar Abascal	Sitcom
Hora 14	24 Horas	2017-04-17	Olga Lambea	News
Hora 20	24 Horas	2017-04-17	Álvaro Zancajo	News
Los Hygge. Una pareja muy natural	La Sexta	2017-04-22	Patricia Pérez & Luis Canut	Docureality
Servir y proteger	La 1	2017-04-24	Luisa Martín	Drama Series
Cable Girls	Netflix	2017-04-28	Blanca Suárez and Yon González	Drama Series
Money Heist	Antena 3	2017-05-03	Álvaro Morte and Úrsula Corberó	Drama Series
Dentro de...	La Sexta	2017-05-04	Cristina Pedroche	Docureality
Spain is different, ¿o no?	13TV	2017-05-07	José Luis Pérez	Variety Show
All you need is love... o no	Telecinco	2017-05-08	Risto Mejide	Dating Show
Fantastic duo	La 1	2017-05-10	Nuria Roca	Music
Viva la Vida	Telecinco	2017-05-20	Toñi Moreno	Variety Show
Perdóname, Señor	Telecinco	2017-05-24	Paz Vega	Miniseries
La isla	La Sexta	2017-05-24	Pedro García Aguado	Reality Show
El Puente	Movistar+	2017-05-29	Paula Vázquez	Docureality
Ninja Warrior	Antena 3	2017-06-09	Arturo Valls, Manolo Lama and Pilar Rubio	Game Show
A cara de perro	Cuatro	2017-06-13	Javier García Roche	Variety Show
Radio Gaga	Movistar+	2017-06-22	Manuel Burque and Quique Peinado	Comedy
The Wall: Cambia tu vida	Telecinco	2017-06-23	Carlos Sobera	Game Show
Socialité	Telecinco	2017-06-24	María Patiño	Gossip Show
Ellas	La 1	2017-06-26	Blanca Portillo	Talk Show
La peluquería	La 1	2017-07-03	Chiqui Fernández	Sitcom
Espíritu salvaje	Cuatro	2017-07-09	Andoni Canela and Meritxell Margarit	Documentary
Contigo al fin del mundo	Antena 3	2017-07-10	Julian Iantzi	Dating Show
Pura magia	La 1	2017-07-11	Mag Lari	Magic
Snacks de tele	Cuatro	2017-07-15		Videos
Hotel romántico	La 1	2017-07-15	Roberto Leal	Dating Show
Mad in Spain	Telecinco	2017-07-23	Jordi González	Talk Show
Me lo dices o me lo cantas	Telecinco	2017-07-25	Jesús Vázquez	Talent Show
Doctor Romero	La 1	2017-07-26		Reality Show
Lolita tiene un plan	La 1	2017-08-07	Lolita Flores	Talk Show
Ella es tu padre	Telecinco	2017-09-04	Carlos Santos	Sitcom
El incidente	Antena 3	2017-09-05	Marta Etura	Drama Series
Estoy vivo	La 1	2017-09-07	Javier Gutiérrez	Drama Series
Sentido común	Telecinco	2017-09-11		Variety Show
Me cambio de década	Antena 3	2017-09-11	Arturo Valls	Variety Show
Està passant	TV3	2017-09-13	Toni Soler	News Satire
Tiempos de guerra	Antena 3	2017-09-20	Alicia Borrachero, Verónica Sánchez and Amaia Salamanca	Drama Series
Velvet Colección	Movistar+	2017-09-21	Marta Hazas and Asier Etxeandía	Drama Series
Un país mágico	La 2	2017-09-23	Miguelillo	Magic
Vergüenza	Movistar+	2017-09-24	Javier Gutiérrez and Malena Alterio	Sitcom
La línea roja	Cuatro	2017-09-26	Jesús Cintora	Investigation
Conquistadores: Adventvm	Movistar+	2017-10-09	Eduardo San Juan	Drama Series
La zona	Movistar+	2017-10-27	Eduard Fernández and Emma Suárez	Drama Series
Cómo lo ves	La 1	2017-10-30	Carlos Herrera	Talk Show
Samanta y...	Cuatro	2017-11-07	Samanta Villar.	Docureality
¿Dónde estabas entonces?	La Sexta	2017-11-16	Ana Pastor	Documentary
Expediente Marlasca	La Sexta	2017-11-24	Manuel Marlasca	Investigation
El accidente	Telecinco	2017-11-28	Quim Gutiérrez and Inma Cuesta	Drama Series
Traición	La 1	2017-11-28	Ana Belén	Drama Series
Singles XD	Cuatro	2017-12-12	Nuria Roca	Dating Show
Clásicos y reverentes	La 2	2017-12-10	La 2 de TVE.	Talent Show
Little Big Show	Telecinco	2017-12-29	Carlos Sobera	Talent Show

== Television shows ==
- La 1
  - Telediario (1957– )
  - Informe Semanal (1973– )
  - Telepasión española (1990– )
  - Los Desayunos de TVE (1994–2020)
  - Cine de barrio (1995– )
  - Corazón (1997– )
  - Cuéntame cómo pasó (2001– )
  - España Directo (2005–2022)
  - Comando actualidad (2008– )
  - Españoles en el mundo (2009 – )
  - La Mañana de La 1 (2009–2020)
  - Audiencia abierta (2012– )
  - Flash Moda (2012– )
  - MasterChef (2013– )
  - MasterChef Junior (2013– )
  - Viaje al centro de la tele (2013– )
  - Aquí la Tierra (2014– )
  - Amigas y conocidas (2014–2018)
  - Ochéntame otra vez (2014–2021)
  - Seguridad vital (2015–2018)
  - Centro médico (2015–2019)
  - Torres en la cocina (2015–2019)
  - El ministerio del tiempo (2015–2020)
  - Acacias 38 (2015–2021)
  - MasterChef Celebrity (2016– )
  - Desafía tu mente (2016–2018)
  - Hora punta (2016–2018)
  - Trabajo temporal (2016–2019)
- Telecinco
  - Informativos Telecinco (1990– )
  - Survivor Spain (2000– )
  - Gran Hermano VIP (2004–2019)
  - El Programa de Ana Rosa (2005– )
  - Pasapalabra (2007–2019)
  - Survivor Spain (2006– )
  - La que se avecina (2007– )
  - Pasapalabra (2007–2019)
  - Mujeres y Hombres y Viceversa (2008–2018)
  - Sálvame (2009– )
  - Deluxe (2009– )
  - La Voz Kids (2014–2018)
  - Cámbiame (2015–2018)
  - Got Talent España (2016– )
  - Mi casa es la tuya (2016– )
  - Las Campos (2016–2018)
- La 2
  - Al filo de lo imposble (1982– )
  - Pueblo de Dios (1982– )
  - Últimas preguntas (1983– )
  - En portada (1984– )
  - Metrópolis (1985– )
  - Documentos TV (1986– )
  - Tendido cero (1986– )
  - Días de cine (1991– )
  - La Aventura del saber (1992– )
  - Jara y sedal (1992– )
  - La 2 noticias (1994–2020)
  - La noche temática, (1995– )
  - Agrosfera (1997– )
  - El escarabajo verde (1997– )
  - Saber y ganar (1997– )
  - El Cine de La 2 (1998– )
  - Versión española (1998– )
  - Aquí hay trabajo (2000– )
  - España en comunidad (2000–2020)
  - Shalom (2003– )
  - Cámara abierta 2.0 (2007– )
  - Página 2 (2007– )
  - En lengua de signos (2008– )
  - Zoom tendencias (2008– )
  - Fábrica de ideas (2008–2017)
  - RTVE responde (2009– )
  - Imprescindibles (2010– )
  - Para todos la Dos (2010– )
  - Cómo nos reímos (2012– )
  - ¡Atención obras! (2013– )
  - Cachitos de hierro y cromo (2013– )
  - Órbita Laika (2014–)
  - Millenium (2014–2019)
  - 80 cm (2015–)
  - El cazador de cerebros (2015– )
  - Historia de nuestro cine (2015– )
  - Medina (2016– )
- Antena 3
  - Antena 3 Noticias (1990– )
  - Espejo público (1996– )
  - La ruleta de la fortuna (2006– )
  - Karlos Arguiñano en tu cocina (2010– )
  - Tu cara me suena (2011– )
  - El Hormiguero (2011– )
  - El secreto de Puente Viejo (2011–2020)
  - ¡Ahora caigo! (2011–2021)
  - Centímetros cúblicos (2012– )
  - Amar es para siempre (2013– )
  - Me resbala (2013–2021)
  - ¡Boom! (2014–2022)
  - Casados a primera vista (2015–2018)
  - Allí abajo (2015–2019)
  - 1, 2, 3... hipnotízame (2016–2019)
- La Sexta
  - El Intermedio (2006– )
  - La Sexta Noticias (2006– )
  - Salvados (2008– )
  - Al rojo vivo (2011– )
  - La Sexta columna (2012– )
  - Más vale tarde (2012– )
  - Pesadilla en la cocina (2012–2020)
  - Equipo de investigación (2013– )
  - Jugones (2013– )
  - El objetivo (2013–2022)
  - Zapeando (2013– )
  - La Sexta noche (2013–2022)
  - El jefe infiltrado (2014– )
  - Enviado Especial (2016–2019)
- Cuatro
  - Cuarto milenio (2005– )
  - Noticias Cuatro (2005–2019)
  - Las mañanas de Cuatro (2006–2018)
  - Granjero busca esposa (2009–2018)
  - Planeta Calleja (2014– )
  - Chester (2014– )
  - Volando voy (2015– )
  - Los Gipsy Kings (2015–2021)
  - En el punto de mira (2016–2022)
  - First Dates (2016– )
- Clan
  - Pocoyo (2005– )

== Ending this year ==
- La 1
  - El Debate de la 1 (2012–2017)
  - Seis Hermanas (2015–2017)
  - Espinete no existe (2016–2017)
- La 2
  - Héroes invisibles (2016–2017)
  - Tips (2016–2017)
- Antena 3
  - Top Chef (2013–2017)
- Telecinco
  - Big Brother Spain (2000–2017)
  - ¡Qué tiempo tan feliz! (2009–2017)
  - Quiero ser (2016–2017)
- Cuatro
  - Supernanny (2006–2017)
  - Hermano mayor (2009–2017)
  - ¿Quién quiere casarse con mi hijo? (2012–2017)
  - Hazte un selfi (2016–2017)

== Changes of network affiliation ==
Show	Moved From	Moved To
Tú sí que vales (2008–2017)	Telecinco	La Sexta
En la tuya o en la mía / Mi casa es la tuya (2016– )	La 1	Telecinco
Operación Triunfo (2001– )	Telecinco	La 1
Pocoyo (2005– )	La 1	Clan

== Deaths ==
- 9 January – José Luis Barcelona, host, 84.
- 29 January – Paloma Chamorro, hostess, 68.
- 24 March – Paloma Gómez Borrero, journalist and writer 82.
- 14 May – Germán Yanke, journalist, 61.
- 1 June – Fernando Medina, meteorologist, 88.
- 5 June – Ketty Kaufmann, journalist, 83.
- 16 June – Marisa Marco, voice actress, 70.
- 11 August – Terele Pávez, actress, 78.
- 11 November – Chiquito de la Calzada, comedian, 85.
- 13 December – Alfredo Castellón, director, 87.
- 29 December – Pedro Osinaga, actor, 81.

== See also ==
- 2017 in Spain
