= 1959 in Spanish television =

This is a list of Spanish television related events from 1959.

== Events ==
- 15 February - For the first time, a football match between Real Madrid and FC Barcelona is broadcast.
- 1 April - TVE broadcasts the inauguration of Valley of the Fallen.
- 19 March - First television criticism is published in Spain by the newspaper ABC publishes.
- 14 July - Official Inauguration of Miramar TV Studios in Barcelona.
- 27 September - Laura Valenzuela, Federico Gallo and Alberto Closas host, from Barcelona, the Mediterranean Song Contest.
- 29 November - Artist Lola Flores sings and dances as guess in the variety show Gran Parada.
- 21 December - TVE broadcasts through the European Broadcasting Union Dwight D. Eisenhower visit to Madrid.

== Debuts ==
- Álbum de familia
- Cuentos para mayores
- Galería de esposas.
- Galería de maridos
- Matrimonios
- Palma y Don Jaime
- El secreto del éxito
- Teatro de familia
- Acierte el error
- A la rueda rueda
- Álbum musical
- Alta fidelidad
- Así es el mundo
- Así va la liga
- Balcón al mediterráneo
- Club Miramar]
- Crucero 59
- Campos y pisajes
- Cuestiones teológicas
- Dos en uno
- Electrónica
- El secreto del éxito
- Entre listos anda el juego
- Érase una vez...
- Estrellas del teatro
- Etapas de la vida española
- Fiesta brava
- Fila cero
- Gente menuda
- Gran parada
- Hablemos de...
- Hogar, dulce hogar
- Hoy es fiesta
- Luna de verano
- Música del Domingo
- Música en su pantalla
- Noticiario de ayer
- Noticiario femenino
- La novela española
- Pantalla deportiva
- Pantalla mágica
- Primer aplauso
- La quiniela
- Teatro en miniatura
- Telecrónica
- Telenoticia
- Tengo un libro en las manos
- X-O da dinero
- Parque infantil
- Ustedes y nosotros
- Versos a medianoche
- Vida católica

== Television shows ==
- Telediario (1957- )
- Teatro Apolo (1958-1960)
- Fila cero (1958-1962)

== Ending this year ==
- Aeropuerto Telefunken (1958-1959)
- Club del sábado (1958-1959)
- Hacia la fama (1958-1959)
- Juicio sumarísimo (1958-1959)

== Foreign series debuts in Spain ==
- Agente X (The Man Called X)
- Cisco Kid.
- Dr. Christian
- Misterios de la ciencia (Science Fiction Theatre)
- Los patrulleros del Oeste (Tales of the Texas Rangers)
- Topper

== Births ==
- 4 February - Juan Manuel López Iturriaga, host.
- 19 February - Ana Gracia, actress.
- 24 February - Mon Santiso, host.
- 15 March - Isabel San Sebastián, journalist.
- 23 March - Henrique Cymerman, journalist.
- 16 April - Emilio Aragón Álvarez, host, actor and comedian
- 6 May - Julia Otero, journalist.
- 10 May - Juanjo de la Iglesia, host.
- 21 May - Adriana Ozores, actress.
- 29 May - José Manuel Lorenzo, producer and director General of Antena 3.
- 16 June - Gloria Lomana, journalist.
- 4 July - Victoria Abril, actress.
- 16 July - Ángeles Caso, hostess.
- 21 September - Eulalia Ramón, actress.
- 26 September - Maribel Ripoll, actress.
- 18 December - María Escario, sport journalist.
- 22 December - Alfredo Urdaci, journalist.

== See also ==
- 1959 in Spain
- List of Spanish films of 1959
