= 2019 in Spanish television =

This is a list of Spanish television related events from 2019.

== Events ==
- 18 August – TV channel LaLigaTV por Movistar Plus+ starts broadcasting.
- 1 October – Following a Supreme Court of Spain decision Telecinco ceases broadcasting the quiz show Pasapalabra after a lawesuit by the rights owner ITV British Channel.
- 24 November – After 13 years Spain returns to the Junior Eurovision Song Contest 2019 and ranks 3rd.
- 4 December – Begoña Alegría resigns from Heaf of News Department in Televisión Española omo directora de informativos de TVE.

== Debuts ==
| Title | Channel | Debut | Performers/Host | Genre |
|---|---|---|---|---|
| Gran Hermano Dúo | Telecinco | 2019-01-08 | Jorge Javier Vázquez | Reality Show |
| Todo es mentira | Cuatro | 2019-01-08 | Risto Mejide | News Magazine |
| Matadero | Antena 3 | 2019-01-09 | Pepe Viyuela | Drama Series |
| Hospital Valle Norte | La 1 | 2019-01-14 | Alexandra Jiménez | Drama Series |
| El embarcadero | Movistar+ | 2019-01-18 | Álvaro Morte and Verónica Sánchez | Drama Series |
| Derecho a soñar | La 1 | 2019-01-21 | Alba Ribas | Drama Series |
| La vida con Samanta | Cuatro | 2019-01-21 | Samanta Villar | Docudrama |
| Vota Juan | TNT | 2019-01-25 | Javier Cámara and María Pujalte | Sitcom |
| +Cotas | La 1 | 2019-02-02 | Macarena Berlín and Ismael Beiro | Science/Culture |
| Un país para escucharlo | La 2 | 2019-02-05 | Ariel Rot | Travel |
| Secretos de Estado | Telecinco | 2019-02-13 | Miryam Gallego | Drama Series |
| Mujeres al poder | Telecinco | 2019-02-13 | Ana Rosa Quintana | Talk Show |
| La mejor canción jamás cantada | La 1 | 2019-02-15 | Roberto Leal | Music |
| Juego de juegos | Antena 3 | 2019-02-15 | Silvia Abril | Quiz Show |
| Cuatro al día | Cuatro | 2019-02-18 | Carme Chaparro | Talk Show |
| Safari, a la caza de la tele | FDF | 2019-02-25 | Irene Junquera | Comedy |
| Scott y Milá | Movistar+ | 2019-02-28 | Mercedes Milá | Variety Show |
| Hacer de comer | La 1 | 2019-03-04 | Dani García | Cooking Show |
| Bake Off España | Cuatro | 2019-03-06 | Jesús Vázquez | Cooking Show |
| Acceso autorizado | La 2 | 2019-03-14 | Cayetana Guillén Cuervo | Docureality |
| Las que faltaban | Movistar+ | 2019-03-15 | Thais Villas | Comedy |
| 45 rpm | Antena 3 | 2019-03-18 | Carlos Cuevas and Guiomar Puerta | Drama Series |
| Prodigios | La 1 | 2019-03-23 | Boris Izaguirre and Paula Prendes | Talent Show |
| La caza. Monteperdido | La 1 | 2019-03-25 | Megan Montaner and Francis Lorenzo | Drama Series |
| Justo antes de Cristo | Movistar+ | 2019-04-05 | Julián López | Sitcom |
| Sálvame Okupa | Telecinco | 2019-04-12 | Carlota Corredera | Reality Show |
| Cena con mamá | La 1 | 2019-04-26 | Cayetana Guillén Cuervo | Cooking Show |
| Donde comen dos | La 1 | 2019-04-26 | El Langui | Cooking Show |
| Masters de la reforma | Antena 3 | 2019-05-06 | Manel Fuentes | Reality Show |
| Brigada Costa del Sol | Telecinco | 2019-05-06 | Hugo Silva | Drama Series |
| La Voz Senior | Antena 3 | 2019-05-08 | Eva González | Talent Show |
| Adivina qué hago esta noche | Cuatro | 2019-05-13 | | Talent Show |
| Instinto | Movistar+ | 2019-05-10 | Mario Casas | Drama Series |
| El cielo puede esperar | Movistar+ | 2019-05-20 | Alberto Casado | Comedy |
| High Seas | Netflix | 2019-05-24 | Ivana Baquero, Jon Kortajarena and Alejandra Onieva | Drama Series |
| Dar cera, pulir 0 | Movistar+ | 2019-06-04 | Patricia Conde and Ángel Martín | Comedy |
| Hierro | Movistar+ | 2019-06-07 | Candela Peña | Drama Series |
| El caso Alcásser | Netflix | 2019-06-14 | | Documentary |
| Señoras del (h)AMPA | Telecinco | 2019-06-19 | Toni Acosta and Malena Alterio | Drama Series |
| A partir de hoy | La 1 | 2019-07-08 | Màxim Huerta | Variety Show |
| Parchís: El documental | Netflix | 2019-07-10 | Parchís | Documentary |
| Hoy no, mañana | La 1 | 2019-07-12 | Santiago Segura | Comedy |
| ¿Juegas o qué? | La 1 | 2019-07-15 | Luis Larrodera | Quiz Show |
| El contenedor | Antena 3 | 2019-07-22 | | Docureality |
| ¡Toma salami! | Telecinco | 2019-07-22 | Javier Capitán | Videos |
| Por el mundo a los 80 | Antena 3 | 2019-07-25 | Arturo Valls | Travel |
| Me quedo contigo | Telecinco | 2019-07-25 | Jesús Vázquez | Dating Show |
| 7 días sin ellas | La 1 | 2019-07-29 | | Docureality |
| El juego de los anillos | Antena 3 | 2019-08-07 | Jorge Fernández | Quiz Show |
| Pequeñas coincidencias | Antena 3 | 2019-09-02 | Marta Hazas and Javier Veiga | Sitcom |
| La mesa del coronel | Cuatro | 2019-09-08 | Pedro Baños | Talk Show |
| Malaka | La 1 | 2019-09-09 | Maggie Civantos | Drama Series |
| En el corredor de la muerte | Movistar+ | 2019-09-13 | Miguel Ángel Silvestre | Drama Series |
| [Vaya crack | La 1 | 2019-09-14 | Roberto Leal] | Talent Show |
| Mónica y el sexo | Cuatro | 2019-09-20 | Mónica Naranjo | Science/Culture |
| Donde menos te lo esperas | Cuatro | 2019-09-20 | Santi Millán | Dating Show |
| Mercado central | La 1 | 2019-09-23 | Antonio Garrido and Begoña Maestre | Soap Opera |
| Toy Boy | Antena 3 | 2019-09-25 | Cristina Castaño | Drama Series |
| Perfect Life | Movistar+ | 2019-10-18 | Leticia Dolera | Drama Series |
| Hache | Netflix | 2019-11-01 | Adriana Ugarte and Eduardo Noriega | Drama Series |
| Promesas de arena | La 1 | 2019-11-11 | Blanca Portillo and Daniel Grao | Drama Series |
| El nudo | Atresplayer | 2019-11-24 | Natalia Verbeke | Drama Series |
| El bribón | Cuatro | 2019-11-25 | Pablo Chiapella | Quiz Show |
| Foodie Love | HBO | 2019-12-04 | Laia Costa | Drama Series |
| Merlí: Sapere Aude | Movistar+ | 2019-12-05 | Carlos Cuevas | Drama Series |
| Three Days of Christmas | Netflix | 2019-12-06 | Victoria Abril | Drama Series |
| The Neighbor | Netflix | 2019-12-31 | Quim Gutiérrez and Clara Lago | Sitcom |

== Television shows ==
- La 1
  - Telediario (1957– )
  - Informe Semanal (1973– )
  - Telepasión española (1990– )
  - Los Desayunos de TVE (1994–2020)
  - Cine de barrio (1995– )
  - Corazón (1997– )
  - Cuéntame cómo pasó (2001– )
  - España Directo (2005–2022)
  - Comando actualidad (2008– )
  - Españoles en el mundo (2009 – )
  - La Mañana de La 1 (2009–2020)
  - Audiencia abierta (2012– )
  - Flash Moda (2012– )
  - MasterChef (2013– )
  - MasterChef Junior (2013– )
  - Viaje al centro de la tele (2013– )
  - Aquí la Tierra (2014– )
  - Ochéntame otra vez (2014–2021)
  - El ministerio del tiempo (2015–2020)
  - TVEmos (2015–2021)
  - Acacias 38 (2015–2021)
  - MasterChef Celebrity (2016– )
  - Estoy vivo (2017–2021)
  - Servir y proteger (2017–2023)
  - Maestros de la costura (2018– )
  - El Paisano (2018– )
  - Lazos de sangre (2018– )
- Telecinco
  - Informativos Telecinco (1990– )
  - Survivor Spain (2000– )
  - El Programa de Ana Rosa (2005– )
  - Survivor Spain (2006– )
  - La que se avecina (2007– )
  - Sálvame (2009– )
  - Deluxe (2009– )
  - Got Talent España (2016– )
  - Mi casa es la tuya (2016– )
  - Socialité (2017– )
  - Viva la vida (2017–2022)
  - Volverte a ver (2018–2021)
  - Ya es mediodía (2018– )
  - Unauthorized Living (2018–2020)
- La 2
  - Al filo de lo imposble (1982– )
  - Pueblo de Dios (1982– )
  - Últimas preguntas (1983– )
  - En portada (1984– )
  - Metrópolis (1985– )
  - Documentos TV (1986– )
  - Tendido cero (1986– )
  - Días de cine (1991– )
  - La Aventura del saber (1992– )
  - Jara y sedal (1992– )
  - La 2 noticias (1994–2020)
  - La noche temática, (1995– )
  - Agrosfera (1997– )
  - El escarabajo verde (1997– )
  - Saber y ganar (1997– )
  - El Cine de La 2 (1998– )
  - Versión española (1998– )
  - Aquí hay trabajo (2000– )
  - España en comunidad (2000–2020)
  - Shalom (2003– )
  - Cámara abierta 2.0 (2007– )
  - Página 2 (2007– )
  - En lengua de signos (2008– )
  - Zoom tendencias ( 2008– )
  - Fábrica de ideas (2008–2017)
  - RTVE responde (2009– )
  - Imprescindibles (2010– )
  - Para todos la Dos (2010– )
  - Cómo nos reímos (2012– )
  - ¡Atención obras! (2013– )
  - Cachitos de hierro y cromo (2013– )
  - Órbita Laika (2014–)
  - 80 cm (2015–)
  - El cazador de cerebros (2015– )
  - Historia de nuestro cine (2015– )
  - Medina (2016– )
  - País mágico, Un (2017– )
  - ¡Qué animal! (2017– )
  - La hora musa (2018–2021)
- Antena 3
  - Antena 3 Noticias (1990– )
  - Espejo público (1996– )
  - La ruleta de la fortuna (2006– )
  - Karlos Arguiñano en tu cocina (2010– )
  - Tu cara me suena (2011– )
  - El Hormiguero (2011– )
  - El secreto de Puente Viejo (2011–2020)
  - ¡Ahora caigo! (2011–2021)
  - Centímetros cúblicos (2012– )
  - Amar es para siempre (2013– )
  - Me resbala (2013–2021)
  - ¡Boom! (2014–2022)
- La Sexta
  - El Intermedio (2006– )
  - La Sexta Noticias (2006– )
  - Salvados (2008– )
  - Al rojo vivo (2011– )
  - La Sexta columna (2012– )
  - Más vale tarde (2012– )
  - Pesadilla en la cocina (2012–2020)
  - Equipo de investigación (2013– )
  - Jugones (2013– )
  - El objetivo (2013–2022)
  - Zapeando (2013– )
  - La Sexta noche (2013–2022)
  - El jefe infiltrado (2014– )
  - ¿Dónde estabas entonces? (2017–2021)
  - ¿Te lo vas a comer? (2018– )
  - Arusitys (2018– )
  - Liarla Pardo (2018–2021)
- Cuatro
  - Cuarto milenio (2005– )
  - Chester (2014– )
  - Planeta Calleja (2014– )
  - Volando voy (2015– )
  - Los Gipsy Kings (2015–2021)
  - En el punto de mira (2016–2022)
  - First Dates (2016– )
  - Ven a cenar conmigo (2017–2021)
  - Héroes, más allá del deber (2017–2020)
  - Mujeres y Hombres y Viceversa (2018–2021)
  - El concurso del año (2018–2021)
  - Ven a cenar conmigo: Gourmet edition (2018–2021)
  - Viajeros Cuatro (2018 – )
- Clan
  - Pocoyo (2005– )

== Ending this year ==
- La 1
  - Centro médico (2015–2019)
  - Torres en la cocina (2015–2019)
  - Trabajo temporal (2016–2019)
  - Arranca en verde (2018–2019)
  - Lo siguiente (2018–2019)
  - la otra mirada (2018–2019)
- La 2
  - Millenium (2014–2019)
  - Ese programa del que usted me habla (2018–2019)
- Antena 3
  - Allí abajo (2015–2019)
  - 1, 2, 3... hipnotízame (2016–2019)
- Telecinco
  - Gran Hermano VIP (2004–2019)
- Cuatro
  - Noticias Cuatro (2005–2019)
  - Pasaporte Pampliega (2018–2019)
- La Sexta
  - Enviado Especial (2016–2019)
  - Carretera y manta (2018–2019)
- Movistar+
  - Fama, ¡a bailar! (2008–2019)
- Fox
  - Locked Up (2015–2019)

== Changes of network affiliation ==
| Show | Moved From | Moved To |
|---|---|---|
| La Voz (2012– ) | Telecinco | Antena 3 |
| La Voz Kids (2014– ) | Telecinco | Antena 3 |
| Money Heist (2017–2021) | Antena 3 | Netflix |

== Deaths ==
- 6 January – Santiago López Castillo, journalist, 74.
- 19 January – Lolo Rico, director and writer, 84.
- 3 March – Martí Galindo, actor, 81.
- 30 March – Paloma Cela, actress, 76.
- 8 April – Héctor del Mar, host, 76.
- 24 April – Conrado San Martín, actor, 98.
- 18 May – Analía Gadé, actress, 87.
- 22 May – Eduardo Punset, director, writer and host, 82.
- June – José María Quero, director, 90.
- 7 June – Narciso Ibáñez Serrador, director and writer, 83.
- 4 July
  - Arturo Fernández, actor, 90.
  - Eduardo Fajardo, actor, 94.
- 24 July – Alejandro Millán, puppeteer.
- 28 July – Eduardo Gómez, actor, 68.
- 30 July – Mari Carmen Izquierdo, sports journalist, 69.
- 7 October – Pepe Oneto, journalist and pundit, 77.
- 2 November – Nicolás Dueñas, actor, 77.
- 23 November – Asunción Balaguer, actress, 94.
- 4 December
  - Claudio Rodríguez, 86, voice actor.
  - Manuel Tejada, actor, 79.
  - Azucena Hernández, actress, 59.

== See also ==
- 2019 in Spain
