= 2021 in Spanish television =

This is a list of Spanish television related events in 2021.

== Events ==
- 1 January – Television channel ETB Basque starts broadcasting.
- March 21 – Telecinco broadcasts documentary Rocío, contar la verdad para seguir viva unleashing reactions from politicians as Irene Montero, Ministry in the Spanish Government, Íñigo Errejón or Rocío Monasterio.
- May 26 – RTVE organization chart is renewed.
- July 8 – The Assembly of Madrid changes by Law the organization chart of Telemadrid.
- July 31 – Television channel Movistar CineDoc&Roll ends broadcasting.
- September 1 – Television channel Clasicos por M+ starts broadcasting.
- October 12 - Television channel 7NN starts broadcasting.

== Debuts ==
Title	Channel	Debut	Performers/Host	Genre
El condensador de fluzo	La 2	2021-01-07	Juan Gómez-Jurado	Science/Culture
El desafío	Antena 3	2021-01-15	Roberto Leal	Talent Show
3 caminos	Prime Video	2021-01-22	Álex González and Verónica Echegui	Drama Series
Deudas	Atresplayer	2021-01-24	Carmen Maura	Drama Series
Two Lives	La 1	2021-01-25	Cristina de Inza	Soap Opera
La noche D	La 1	2021-01-26	Dani Rovira	Late Night
Alive and Kicking	Movistar+	2021-01-29	Álvaro Requena	Sitcom
Palo y astilla	La Sexta	2021-02-02	Mamen Mendizábal	Talk Show
Dos parejas y un destino	La 1	2021-02-10		Travel
The Boarding School: Las Cumbres	Prime Video	2021-02-19	Asia Ortega	Drama Series
La cocinera de Castamar	Atresplayer	2021-02-21	Michelle Jenner and Roberto Enríquez	Drama Series
Ver-Mú	Movistar+	2021-03-18	María Guerra	Talk Show
Sky Rojo	Netflix	2021-03-19	Verónica Sánchez and Miguel Ángel Silvestre	Drama Series
Rocío, contar la verdad para seguir viva	Telecinco	2021-03-21	Rocío Carrasco	Docureality
Blowing Kisses	Disney+	2021-03-26	Paco León	Drama Series
La templanza	Prime Video	2021-03-26	Rafael Novoa and Leonor Watling	Drama Series
Libertad	Movistar+	2021-03-26	Bebe Rebolledo	Drama Series
Alba	Atresplayer	2021-03-28	Elena Rivera	Drama Series
The Dancer	La 1	2021-04-05	Ion Aramendi and Sandra Cervera	Talent Show
Un país para reírlo	La 2	2021-04-06	Goyo Jiménez	Travel
Rutas bizarras	La 1	2021-04-06	Marta Hazas and Xosé Antonio Touriñán	Travel
Diario de un ciclista	La 1	2021-04-11	Pello Ruiz Cabestany	Travel
Love Island	Neox	2021-04-11	Cristina Pedroche	Dating Show
The Innocent (TV series)	Netflix	2021-04-30	Mario Casas and Aura Garrido	Drama Series
Top Star. ¿Cuánto vale tu voz?	Telecinco	2021-05-07	Jesús Vázquez	Talent Show
LOL: Si te ríes pierdes	Prime Video	2021-05-14	Santiago Segura	Comedy
Reyes de la noche	Movistar+	2021-05-14	Javier Gutiérrez.	Drama Series
Parot	Prime Video	2021-05-28	Adriana Ugarte	Miniseries
Drag Race España	Atresplayer	2021-05-30	Supremme de Luxe	Reality Competition
B.S.O.	Movistar+	2021-06-02	Emilio Aragón	Music
Paradise	Movistar+	2021-06-04	Macarena García	Drama Series
Queer You Are	TNT	2021-06-18	Bob Pop	Drama Series
Todo es verdad	Cuatro	2021-06-29	Risto Mejide and Marta Flich	News Magazine
Los relojes del diablo	Cuatro	2021-07-05	Álvaro Cervantes	Drama Series
Supernormal	Movistar+	2021-07-09	Miren Ibarguren	Sitcom
Family Feud: La batalla de los famosos	Antena 3	2021-07-30	Nuria Roca	Quiz Show
Días de verano	La 1	2021-08-09	Inés Paz	Variety Show
Veo cómo cantas	Antena 3	2021-09-08	Manel Fuentes	Talent Show
Secret Story: La casa de los secretos	Telecinco	2021-09-09	Jorge Javier Vázquez	Reality Show
Mejor contigo	La 1	2021-09-13	Ion Aramendi	Variety Show
Los teloneros	Cuatro	2021-09-13	Antonio Castelo	Comedy
ANA. all in	La 1	2021-09-21	Maribel Verdú and Natalia Verbeke	Drama Series
Jaguar (TV series)	Netflix	2021-09-22	Blanca Suárez	Drama Series
La fortuna	Movistar+	2021-09-30	Ana Polvorosa	Drama Series
La roca	La Sexta	2021-10-10	Nuria Roca	Variety Show
Un país en danza	La 2	2021 2021	Antonio Najarro	Travel
La matemática del espejo	La 2	2021-10-14	Carlos del Amor	Talk Show
Insiders	Netflix	2021-10-21	Najwa Nimri	Reality Show
Dafne and the Rest	HBO	2021-10-26	Abril Zamora	Drama Series
El tiempo que te doy	Netflix	2021-10-29	Nadia de Santiago	Drama Series
A simple vista	Cuatro	2021-11-02	Paz Padilla	Game Show
Cardo	Atresplayer	2021-11-07	Ana Rujas	Drama Series
Ya son las ocho	Telecinco	2021-11-15	Sonsoles Ónega	Variety Show
Fuera del mapa	La Sexta	2021-11-23	Alberto Chicote	Travel
LEGO Masters España	Antena 3	2021-12-15	Roberto Leal	Game Show
Celebrity Bake Off	Prime Video	2021-12-16	Paula Vázquez and Brays Efe	Cooking Show

== Television shows ==
- La 1
  - Telediario (1957– )
  - Informe Semanal (1973– )
  - Telepasión española (1990– )
  - Cine de barrio (1995– )
  - Corazón (1997– )
  - Cuéntame cómo pasó (2001– )
  - España Directo (2005–2022)
  - Comando actualidad (2008– )
  - Españoles en el mundo (2009 – )
  - Audiencia abierta (2012– )
  - Flash Moda (2012– )
  - MasterChef (2013– )
  - MasterChef Junior (2013– )
  - Viaje al centro de la tele (2013– )
  - Aquí la Tierra (2014– )
  - MasterChef Celebrity (2016– )
  - Servir y proteger (2017–2023)
  - Maestros de la costura (2018– )
  - Lazos de sangre (2018– )
  - La Caza (2019– )
  - HIT (2020– )
  - Hora de La 1, La (2020– )
  - Cazador, El (2020– )
- Telecinco
  - Informativos Telecinco (1990– )
  - Survivor Spain (2000– )
  - El Programa de Ana Rosa (2005– )
  - Survivor Spain (2006– )
  - La que se avecina (2007– )
  - Sálvame (2009– )
  - Deluxe (2009– )
  - Got Talent España (2016– )
  - Mi casa es la tuya (2016– )
  - Socialité (2017– )
  - Viva la vida (2017–2022)
  - Ya es mediodía (2018– )
  - Mujeres al poder (2019–2022)
  - Idol Kids (2020– ¿?)
  - Isla de las tentaciones, Las (2020– )
  - Madres. Amor y vida (2020– )
  - El pueblo (2020– )
- La 2
  - Al filo de lo imposble (1982– )
  - Pueblo de Dios (1982– )
  - Últimas preguntas (1983– )
  - En portada (1984– )
  - Metrópolis (1985– )
  - Documentos TV (1986– )
  - Tendido cero (1986– )
  - Días de cine (1991– )
  - La Aventura del saber (1992– )
  - Jara y sedal (1992– )
  - La noche temática, (1995– )
  - Agrosfera (1997– )
  - El escarabajo verde (1997– )
  - Saber y ganar (1997– )
  - El Cine de La 2 (1998– )
  - Versión española (1998– )
  - Aquí hay trabajo (2000– )
  - Shalom (2003– )
  - Cámara abierta 2.0 (2007– )
  - Página 2 (2007– )
  - En lengua de signos (2008– )
  - Zoom tendencias ( 2008– )
  - Fábrica de ideas (2008–2017)
  - RTVE responde (2009– )
  - Imprescindibles (2010– )
  - Para todos la Dos (2010– )
  - Cómo nos reímos (2012– )
  - ¡Atención obras! (2013– )
  - Cachitos de hierro y cromo (2013– )
  - Órbita Laika (2014–)
  - 80 cm (2015–)
  - El cazador de cerebros (2015– )
  - Historia de nuestro cine (2015– )
  - Medina (2016– )
  - País mágico, Un (2017– )
  - ¡Qué animal! (2017– )
  - Ruralitas (2020– )
  - Tesoros de la tele (2020– )
- Antena 3
  - Antena 3 Noticias (1990– )
  - Espejo público (1996– )
  - La ruleta de la fortuna (2006– )
  - Karlos Arguiñano en tu cocina (2010– )
  - Tu cara me suena (2011– )
  - El Hormiguero (2011– )
  - Centímetros cúblicos (2012– )
  - Amar es para siempre (2013– )
  - ¡Boom! (2014–2022)
  - La Voz (2019– )
  - La Voz Kids (2019– )
  - La Voz Senior (2019– )
  - Mask Singer (2020– )
- La Sexta
  - El Intermedio (2006– )
  - La Sexta Noticias (2006– )
  - Salvados (2008– )
  - Al rojo vivo (2011– )
  - La Sexta columna (2012– )
  - Más vale tarde (2012– )
  - Equipo de investigación (2013– )
  - Jugones (2013– )
  - El objetivo (2013–2022)
  - Zapeando (2013– )
  - La Sexta noche (2013–2022)
  - El jefe infiltrado (2014– )
  - ¿Te lo vas a comer? (2018– )
  - Arusitys (2018– )
  - La Sexta clave (2020– )
  - Lo de Évole (2020– )
- Cuatro
  - Cuarto milenio (2005– )
  - Planeta Calleja (2014– )
  - Volando voy (2015– )
  - En el punto de mira (2016–2022)
  - First Dates (2016– )
  - Viajeros Cuatro (2018 – )
  - Cuatro al día (2019– )
  - Todo es mentira (2019– )
  - First Dates: Crucero (2020– )
  - Iumiuky (2020– )
- Clan
  - Pocoyo (2005– )

== Ending this year ==
- La 1
  - Ochéntame otra vez (2014–2021)
  - TVEmos (2015–2021)
  - Acacias 38 (2015–2021)
  - Estoy vivo (2017–2021)
  - Mercado Central (2019–2021)
  - El paisano (2018-2021)
  - Prodigios (2019–2021)
  - Como Sapiens (2020–2021)
  - Las cosas claras (2020–2021)
- La 2
  - La hora musa (2018–2021)
- Telecinco
  - Volverte a ver (2018–2021)
  - Horizonte: Informe Covid (2020–2021)
- Antena 3
  - ¡Ahora caigo! (2011–2021)
  - Me resbala (2013–2021)
  - Pequeñas coincidencias (2019–2021)
- La Sexta
  - ¿Dónde estabas entonces? (2017–2021)
  - Liarla Pardo (2018–2021)
- Cuatro
  - Los Gipsy Kings (2015–2021)
  - Ven a cenar conmigo (2017–2021)
  - Mujeres y Hombres y Viceversa (2008–2021)
  - El concurso del año (2018–2021)
  - Ven a cenar conmigo: Gourmet edition (2018–2021)
- Movistar+
  - Late Motiv (2016–2021)
- Netflix
  - Money Heist (2017–2021)
  - The Idhun Chronicles (2020–2021)

== Changes of network affiliation ==
Show	Moved From	Moved To
El precio justo (1988–2021)	Antena 3	Telecinco
Alta tensión (1998– )	Telecinco	Cuatro

== Deaths ==
- January 7 – Alfonso Eduardo Pérez Orozco, presenter, 80.
- March 1 – Enrique San Francisco, actor, 65.
- March 3 – Àlex Casademunt, Singer, actor and presenter, 39.
- March 17 – Antón García Abril, composer, 87.
- April 24 – Hugo Stuven, director, 80.
- April 28 – Juan Joya El Risitas, comedian, 65.
- June 23 – Mila Ximénez, pundit, 69.
- July 3 – Carmen Bernardos, actress, 91.
- July 5 – Tico Medina, presenter, 86.
- July 17 – Pilar Bardem, actress, 82.
- July 22 – Ana María Ventura, actress, 98.
- July 29 – Carmelo Martínez, Singer, 64.
- August 20 – Matilde Vilariño, voice actress, 100.
- August 26 – Juana Ginzo, voice actress, 99.
- September 8 – Jordi Rebellón, actor, 64.
- September 29 – Antonio Gasset, presenter, 75.
- November 12 – Ágata Lys, actress, 67.
- December 13 – Verónica Forqué, actress, 66.

== See also ==
- 2021 in Spain
- List of Spanish films of 2021
