= 1965 in Spanish television =

This is a list of Spanish television related events from 1965.

== Events ==
- 7 February - Conchita Bautista is selected to represent Spain at the 1965 Eurovision Song Contest with her song "¡Qué bueno, qué bueno!". She is selected to be the fifth Spanish Eurovision entry during Eurofestival held at TVE Studios in Barcelona.
- 22 February: TVE broadcasts an adaptation of The Crucible by Arthur Miller, directed by Pedro Amalio López, and starred by Gemma Cuervo, Lola Gaos and Irene Gutiérrez Caba becoming a masterpiece in Life Theatre on Spanish TV.
- 6 October: Estudio 1, the most iconic Theatre show on Soanish TV, debuts on TVE.

== Debuts ==
=== La 1 ===
- Don Quijote
- Dos en la ciudad
- Estudio 1
- La otra cara del espejo
- Tal para cual
- Teatro catalán
- Teatro de humor
- Teatro para todos
- Tiempo y hora
- Tú tranquilo
- La vida empieza hoy
- Actualidad científica
- A toda plana
- Antena infantil
- Años luz
- Arte y artistas
- Las artes y las letras
- Ayer domingo
- Biografía
- Cartel
- Ciencia e imagen
- El circo
- Cesta y puntos
- Club femenino
- Complementos
- Cuento infantil
- Cultura e imagen
- Del hilo al ovillo
- Día de fiesta
- Dobles melodías
- Documento
- El que dice ser y llamarse
- Expedición
- Fin de semana
- Flamenco
- Geografía de la cultura
- Historia de... Una cantante
- Historias para no dormir
- El hombre en el espacio
- Los isleños
- Las letras
- Del mar a la montaña
- El médico indígena
- Mundo Animal
- La música
- Musical 14,05
- Noche del sábado
- Objetivo indiscreto
- Recuerde usted...
- El rincón de los chicos
- Rodeo
- La rosa encendida
- Santi, botones de hotel
- Siete siete
- Supervivencia
- Suplemento semanal
- Uno más no importa
- Unos pasos por los libros
- Una puerta abierta al mundo
- Un tema para el debate
- ¿Usted que hubiera hecho?
- La urgente soledad
- Verbena
- La verdad de las cosas
- La vida empieza hoy
- ¿Quién dice la verdad?

=== La 2 ===
- Aquí el segundo programa
- Concierto
- Concurso de guiones
- Documento
- Edición especial
- El crimen no es rentable
- El rincón de las aficiones
- Secuencia
- Un premio en la pantalla

== Television shows ==
- Telediario (1957- )
- Primer aplauso (1959-1966)
- Tengo un libro en las manos (1959-1966)
- Escala en hi-fi (1961-1967)
- Tortuga perezosa, La (1961-1968)
- Ésta es su vida (1962-1968)
- Novela (1962-1979)
- Punto de vista (1963-1966)
- Revista para la mujer (1963-1967)
- Edición especial (1963-1969)
- Fin de semana (1963-1970)
- Panorama de actualidad (1963-1970)
- Reina por un día (1964-1966)
- Tele-club (1964-1966)
- Unión hace la fuerza, La (1964-1966)
- Séneca, El (1964-1970)

== Ending this year ==
- Teatro de familia (1959-1965)
- Primera fila (1962-1965)
- Confidencias (1963-1965)
- En antena (1963-1965)
- Escuela de maridos (1963-1965)
- Estudio 3 (1963-1965)
- Foro TV (1963-1965)
- ¿Quién es quién? (1963-1965)
- Salto a la fama (1963-1965)
- Sonría, por favor (1963-1965)
- Teledomingo (1963-1965)
- Tras la puerta cerrada (1963-1965)
- Visado para el futuro (1963-1965)
- Discorama (1964-1965)
- Eurofestival (1964-1965)
- Lección de ocio (1964-1965)
- Lunes con Ángel, Los (1964-1965)
- Mañana puede ser verdad (1964-1965)
- Noche de estrellas (1964-1965)
- Olimpiada del saber, La (1964-1965)
- Sábado 64 (1964-1965)
- Tarjeta de visita (1964-1965)
- Teatro de humor (1964-1965)
- Tragedias de la vida vulgar (1964-1965)

== Foreign series debuts in Spain ==
=== La 1 ===
- Valentine's Day (El día de Valentín) (USA)
- The Fugitive (El fugutivo) (USA)
- The Saint (El Santo) (UK)
- The Lieutenant (El Teniente) (USA)
- Bewitched (Embrujada) (USA)
- Hawaiian Eye (Intriga en Hawai) (USA)
- The Munsters (La familia Monster) (USA)
- The Adventures of Lariat Sam (USA)
- The Beverly Hillbillies (Los nuevos ricos) (USA)
- Mr. Novak (USA)
- The Lucy Show (USA)
- Voyage to the Bottom of the Sea (Viaje al fondo del mar) (USA)

=== La 2 ===
- Alfred Hitchcock Presents (Alfred Hitchcock presenta)
- Arrest and Trial (Arresto y juicio)

== Births ==
- 1 January - Silvia Gambino, actress.
- 14 January - Toni Cantó, actor.
- 24 January - Andreu Buenafuente, host.
- 16 March - Belén Rueda, actress and hostess.
- 18 March - María José Sáez Carrasco, journalist
- 1 April - Jose Toledo, hostess.
- 4 April - Sergio Pazos, host.
- 6 April - Andoni Ferreño, host and actor.
- 11 April - Jesús Calleja, host.
- 6 June - Soledad Mallol, actress and comedian.
- 14 June - Paco Lodeiro, host.
- 20 June - Remedios Cervantes, actress and hostess.
- 27 June - Juan José Artero, actor.
- 28 June - Teté Delgado, actress.
- 30 June - José Mota, comedian.
- 26 July - Ana García-Siñeriz, hostess.
- 28 July - Mariló Montero, hostess.
- 4 August - Neus Asensi, actress.
- 31 August - Pablo Motos, host.
- 31 August - Terelu Campos, hostess.
- 7 September - Antonio Lobato, journalist sport.
- 9 September - Jesús Vázquez, host.
- 23 September - Diana Peñalver, actress.
- 28 September - Susana Roza, hostess.
- 29 September - Boris Izaguirre, host.
- 5 October - José Couso, cameraman.
- 31 October - Mario Zorrilla, actor.
- 1 November - Gemma Nierga, journalist.
- 11 November - Juan Antonio Muñoz, comedian.
- 14 December - José Corbacho, host, actor and comedian.
- 16 December - Elsa Anka, hostess.
- 27 December - Gustavo González, journalist.
- Santiago Urrialde, comedian.
- Yolanda Arestegui, actress.

== See also ==
- 1965 in Spain
- List of Spanish films of 1965
