= 2018 in Spanish television =

This is a list of Spanish television related events from 2018.

== Events ==
- 18 April - TV channel A&E stops broadcasting, being replaced by the Iberian version of Blaze.
- 25 April – À Punt, regional public television in the Valencian Community is launched.
- 27 July – Rosa María Mateo is appointed Provisional Sole Administrator of RTVE.
- 31 July – José Antonio Álvarez Gundín is replaced by Begoña Alegría as Head of the News Department in RTVE.
- 9 August – TV channel Liga de Campeones por Movistar Plus+ starts broadcasting.
- 16 September – TV channel Vamos por Movistar Plus+ starts broadcasting.
- 4 December – María Casado is elected President of the Academy of Television and Audiovisual Arts and Science.

== Debuts ==
Title	Channel	Debut	Performers/Host	Genre
Apaches	Antena 3	2018-01-08	Alberto Ammann and Paco Tous	Drama Series
La peste	Movistar+	2018-01-12	Paco León	Drama Series
Los reyes del barrio	Cuatro	2018-01-18		Docureality
Volverte a ver	Telecinco	2018-01-18	Carlos Sobera	Variety Show
Desaparecidos	La 1	2018-01-24	Silvia Intxaurrondo	Investigation
Pasaporte Pampliega	Cuatro	2018-01-30	Antonio Pampliega	Docurreality
The Resistance	Movistar+	2018-02-01	David Broncano	Late Night
Cuerpo de élite	Antena 3	2018-02-06	Cristina Castaño, Canco Rodríguez and Octavi Pujades	Sitcom
Mira lo que has hecho	Movistar+	2019-02-23	Berto Romero	Sitcom
Fariña	La 1	2018-02-28	Javier Rey	Drama Series
Dicho y hecho	La 1	2018-03-09	Anabel Alonso and José Corbacho	Comedy
WifiLeaks	Movistar+	2018-03-19	Patricia Conde and Ángel Martín	Comedy
Top 50: momentazos de humor.	Antena 3	2018-03-30	Cristina Pedroche	Comedy
Viajeros Cuatro	Cuatro	2018-04-03		Travel
Fugitiva	La 1	2018-04-05	Paz Vega	Drama Series
Félix	Movistar+	2018-04-06	Leonardo Sbaraglia	Drama Series
Liarla Pardo	La Sexta	2018-04-15	Cristina Pardo	News Magazine
Pasapalabra en familia	Telecinco	2018-0416	Christian Gálvez se pone al frente del concurso	Quiz Show
La otra mirada	La 1	2018-04-25	Macarena García and Ana Wagener	Drama Series
Retratos con alma	La 1	2018 94-25	Isabel Gemio	Talk Show
La noche de Rober	Antena 3	2018-05-11	Roberto Vilar and Silvia Abril	Comedy
Bailando con las estrellas	La 1	2018-05-15	Roberto Leal	Talent Show
El paisano	La 1	2018-05-18	Pablo Chiapella	Travel
La verdad	Telecinco	2018-05-21	Lydia Bosch, Jon Kortajarena and Elena Rivera	Drama Series
Cathedral of the Sea	Antena 3	2018-05-23	Aitor Luna, Michelle Jenner and Silvia Abascal	Drama Series
Ya es mediodía	Telecinco	2018-06-15	Sonsoles Ónega	Variety Show
What the Future Holds	Movistar+	2018-06-22	Oriol Pla and Aura Garrido	Drama Series
Scoop	La Sexta	2018-06-26	Mamen Mendizábal	Investigation
Lazos de sangre	La 1	2018-07-05	Inés Ballester	Variety Show
Crush: La pasta te aplasta	La 1	2018-07-13	Juan Manuel López Iturriaga	Quiz Show
Ambulancias, en el corazón de la ciudad	La Sexta	2018-07-15		Docureality
Ven a cenar conmigo: Gourmet edition	Cuatro	2018-07-16	Luis Larrodera	Variety Show
Hechos reales	Telecinco	2018-07-25	Jordi González	Talk Show
Sabuesos	La 1	2018-07-31	Salva Reina and María Esteve	Sitcom
Mamás y papás a la vista	La 1	2018-07-31		Docureality
El concurso del año	Cuatro	2018-08-27	Dani Martínez	Quiz Show
Arusitys	La Sexta	2018-09-03	Alfonso Arús	Variety Show
Misión exclusiva	Cuatro	2018-09-05	Sergio Garrido	Gossip Show
Capítulo 0	Movistar+	2018-09-11	Ernesto Sevilla and Joaquín Reyes	Comedy
El Continental	La 1	2018-09-17	Álex García and Michelle Jenner	Drama Series
Presunto culpable	Antena 3	2018-09-18	Miguel Ángel Muñoz	Drama Series
Bienvenidos a mi hotel	Cuatro	2018-09-18		Game Show
Vivir sin permiso	Telecinco	2018-09-25	José Coronado and Álex González	Drama Series
La hora musa	La 2	2018-10-01	Maika Makovski.	Music
Gigantes de La 2	La 2	2018-10-04	Mari Cruz Soriano	Talk Show
Gigantes	Movistar+	2018-10-04	Isak Férriz and Daniel Grao	Drama Series
Me cambio de apellido	Cuatro	2018-10-05		Docureality
Élite	Netflix	2018-10-05	María Pedraza	Drama Series
Intercambio consentido	Antena 3	2018-10-15		Reality Show
¿Te lo vas a comer?	La Sexta	2018-10-18	Alberto Chicote	Cooking Show
Lo siguiente	La 1	2018-10-29	Raquel Sánchez-Silva	Variety Show
Asesinato en la Universidad	La 1	2018-11-01	Leonor Watling	TV-Movie
Arde Madrid	Movistar+	2018-11-08	Inma Cuesta and Paco León	Drama Series
Cuatro Weddings	Cuatro	2018-11-12		Docureality
Carretera y manta	La Sexta	2018-11-28	Jesús Cintora	News Magazine
Ese programa del que usted me habla	La 2	2018-12-03	María Gómez, Marta Flich and Alberto Casado	Comedy
Abducidos	Playz	2018-12-12	Daniel Pérez Prada and Ignacio Mateos	Comedy

== Television shows ==
- La 1
  - Telediario (1957– )
  - Informe Semanal (1973– )
  - Telepasión española (1990– )
  - Los Desayunos de TVE (1994–2020)
  - Cine de barrio (1995– )
  - Corazón (1997– )
  - Cuéntame cómo pasó (2001– )
  - España Directo (2005–2022)
  - Comando actualidad (2008– )
  - Españoles en el mundo (2009 – )
  - La Mañana de La 1 (2009–2020)
  - Audiencia abierta (2012– )
  - Flash Moda (2012– )
  - MasterChef (2013– )
  - MasterChef Junior (2013– )
  - Viaje al centro de la tele (2013– )
  - Aquí la Tierra (2014– )
  - Ochéntame otra vez (2014–2021)
  - Centro médico (2015–2019)
  - Torres en la cocina (2015–2019)
  - El ministerio del tiempo (2015–2020)
  - Acacias 38 (2015–2021)
  - MasterChef Celebrity (2016– )
  - Trabajo temporal (2016–2019)
  - Estoy vivo (2017–2021)
  - Servir y proteger (2017–2023)
- Telecinco
  - Informativos Telecinco (1990– )
  - Survivor Spain (2000– )
  - Gran Hermano VIP (2004–2019)
  - El Programa de Ana Rosa (2005– )
  - Pasapalabra (2007–2019)
  - Survivor Spain (2006– )
  - La que se avecina (2007– )
  - Pasapalabra (2007–2019)
  - Sálvame (2009– )
  - Deluxe (2009– )
  - Got Talent España (2016– )
  - Mi casa es la tuya (2016– )
  - Socialité (2017– )
  - Viva la vida (2017–2022)
- La 2
  - Al filo de lo imposble (1982– )
  - Pueblo de Dios (1982– )
  - Últimas preguntas (1983– )
  - En portada (1984– )
  - Metrópolis (1985– )
  - Documentos TV (1986– )
  - Tendido cero (1986– )
  - Días de cine (1991– )
  - La Aventura del saber (1992– )
  - Jara y sedal (1992– )
  - La 2 noticias (1994–2020)
  - La noche temática, (1995– )
  - Agrosfera (1997– )
  - El escarabajo verde (1997– )
  - Saber y ganar (1997– )
  - El Cine de La 2 (1998– )
  - Versión española (1998– )
  - Aquí hay trabajo (2000– )
  - España en comunidad (2000–2020)
  - Shalom (2003– )
  - Cámara abierta 2.0 (2007– )
  - Página 2 (2007– )
  - En lengua de signos (2008– )
  - Zoom tendencias (2008– )
  - Fábrica de ideas (2008–2017)
  - RTVE responde (2009– )
  - Imprescindibles (2010– )
  - Para todos la Dos (2010– )
  - Cómo nos reímos (2012– )
  - ¡Atención obras! (2013– )
  - Cachitos de hierro y cromo (2013– )
  - Órbita Laika (2014–)
  - Millenium (2014–2019)
  - 80 cm (2015–)
  - El cazador de cerebros (2015– )
  - Historia de nuestro cine (2015– )
  - Medina (2016– )
  - País mágico, Un (2017– )
  - ¡Qué animal! (2017– )
- Antena 3
  - Antena 3 Noticias (1990– )
  - Espejo público (1996– )
  - La ruleta de la fortuna (2006– )
  - Karlos Arguiñano en tu cocina (2010– )
  - Tu cara me suena (2011– )
  - El Hormiguero (2011– )
  - El secreto de Puente Viejo (2011–2020)
  - ¡Ahora caigo! (2011–2021)
  - Centímetros cúblicos (2012– )
  - Amar es para siempre (2013– )
  - Me resbala (2013–2021)
  - ¡Boom! (2014–2022)
  - Allí abajo (2015–2019)
  - 1, 2, 3... hipnotízame (2016–2019)
- La Sexta
  - El Intermedio (2006– )
  - La Sexta Noticias (2006– )
  - Salvados (2008– )
  - Al rojo vivo (2011– )
  - La Sexta columna (2012– )
  - Más vale tarde (2012– )
  - Pesadilla en la cocina (2012–2020)
  - Equipo de investigación (2013– )
  - Jugones (2013– )
  - El objetivo (2013–2022)
  - Zapeando (2013– )
  - La Sexta noche (2013–2022)
  - El jefe infiltrado (2014– )
  - Enviado Especial (2016–2019)
  - ¿Dónde estabas entonces? (2017–2021)
- Cuatro
  - Cuarto milenio (2005– )
  - Noticias Cuatro (2005–2019)
  - Planeta Calleja (2014– )
  - Chester (2014– )
  - Volando voy (2015– )
  - Los Gipsy Kings (2015–2021)
  - En el punto de mira (2016–2022)
  - First Dates (2016– )
  - Ven a cenar conmigo (2017–2021)
  - Héroes, más allá del deber (2017–2020)
  - Mujeres y Hombres y Viceversa (2018–2021)
- Clan
  - Pocoyo (2005– )

== Ending this year ==
- La 1
  - Amigas y conocidas (2014–2018)
  - Seguridad vital (2015–2018)
  - Desafía tu mente (2016–2018)
  - Hora punta (2016–2018)
  - Pura magia (2017–2018)
  - Traición (2017–2018)
- La 2
  - Clásicos y reverentes (2017–2018)
- Antena 3
  - Casados a primera vista (2015–2018)
- Telecinco
  - Cámbiame (2015–2018)
  - Las Campos (2016–2018)
  - El accidente (2017–2018)
  - Ella es tu padre (2017–2018)
  - Little Big Show (2017–2018)
- Cuatro
  - Las mañanas de Cuatro (2006–2018)
  - Granjero busca esposa (2009–2018)
  - Dani & Flo (2017–2018)
  - Samanta y... (2017–2018)
- La Sexta
  - Expediente Marlasca (2017–2018)
  - Malas compañías (2017–2018)

== Changes of network affiliation ==
Show	Moved From	Moved To
Fama, ¡a bailar! (2008–2019)	Cuatro	Movistar+
Factor X (2007–)	Cuatro	Telecinco
Mujeres y Hombres y Viceversa (2008–2021)	Telecinco	Cuatro
Locked Up (2015–2019)	Antena 3	Fox
Paquita Salas (2016–2019)	Flooxer	Netflix

== Deaths ==
- 9 January – Maruja Callaved, hostess and director, 89.
- 17 January – Ramón Pradera, director.
- 22 February – Antonio Fraguas Forges, cartoonist, 76.
- 20 April – Pedro Erquicia, journalist, 75.
- 5 May – José María Íñigo, host, 75.
- 12 May – Antonio Mercero, director and writer, 82.
- 16 August – Marisa Porcel, actress, 74.
- 2 November – Álvaro de Luna, actor, 83.
- 22 November, José Luis Pellicena, actor, 85.
- 30 December – Cesáreo Estébanez, actor, 77.

== See also ==
- 2018 in Spain
