= 1957 in Spanish television =

This is a list of Spanish television related events from 1957.

== Events ==
- 13 January: First Theatre Play in Spanish television is broadcast live: Before Breakfast (Eugene O'Neill), directed by Juan Guerrero Zamora and starred by Maruchi Fresno.
- 22 April – José M. Revuelta is appointed by the Government Director General of Radio and Television.
- September – First Talk show in Televisión Española: Tele-Madrid, hosted by Tico Medina and Yale.
- 15 September – Telediario, the longest-running News program in Spanish television debuts on TVE.

== Debuts ==
- Los Tele-Rodríguez
- Teatro en TVE
- Bodega jerezana
- Buena suerte
- Buenas noches, amigos
- Cita con la música
- Cocina
- Concierto para el hogar
- Cotilleo al aire libre
- El Día del Señor
- Edición especial
- El enigma
- Entre nosotras
- Festival Marconi
- Hoy es fiesta
- Imágenes
- La entrevista de la semana
- Las hazañas de Marianín y Teresita
- La Hora Philips
- Menú Balay
- Mesa redonda
- Teatro de la TVE
- Tele-Madrid
- Telediario
- El premio para el más listo
- Ritmos al aire
- El Tranvía del humor
- Últimas noticias
- Los viernes concierto

== Ending this year ==
- Desde mi butaca. (1956–1957)
- Imagen de una vida. (1956–1957)

== Foreign series debuts in Spain ==
- Patrulla de tráfico (Highway Patrol)

== Births ==
- 18 January – Marián Flores, hostess (Un, dos, tres...responda otra vez).
- 15 February – Jordi Rebellón, actor.
- 2 March – Virginia Mataix, actress
- 11 March – Isabel Ordaz, actress. (Aquí no hay quien viva, la que se avecina).
- 23 March – Nieves Herrero, hostess.
- 7 April – Mariano Peña, actor. (Aída)
- 22 May – Enrique del Pozo, Singer and host.
- 27 May – Iñaki Miramón, actor.
- 15 June – Iñaki Cano, sports journalist.
- 8 July – Carlos Herrera, journalist.
- 9 August – Juan José Guerenabarrena, host.
- 14 August – José Coronado, actor. (Periodistas)
- 19 August – Gracia Olayo, actress.
- 16 September – Assumpta Serna, actress. (Falcon Crest)
- 19 September – Pepe Carrol, presenter
- 9 December – José Luis Gil, actor. (Aquí no hay quien viva, la que se avecina).
- 15 December – Luis Fernández Fernández, President of RTVE.
- 25 December – Elena Sánchez, journalist.
- Juan Ramón Sánchez, actor (Barrio Sésamo).

== See also ==
- 1957 in Spain
- List of Spanish films of 1957
