= 1964 in Spanish television =

This is a list of Spanish television related events from 1964.

== Events ==
- 26 March: Jesús Aparicio-Bernal is appointed Director General of RTVE.
- 29 March: The show Reina por un día, debuts in TVE, becoming a real bis success that season.
- 18 July: Official inauguration of the new headquarters of TVE, Studios in Prado del Rey, Madrid.

== Debuts ==
- 30 grados a la sombra
- Equipo de vuelo
- La historia de San Michele
- Historias de mi barrio
- Mañana puede ser verdad
- Pobre diablo
- El Séneca
- Teatro de humor
- Tragedias de la vida vulgar
- Adelante el inventor
- A media voz
- Antes del amanecer
- Aventura
- Bachillerato TV
- Ballet colombiano
- Baraja musical
- Biografía del ayer
- Buenos días
- Busque su pareja
- Cámara 64
- Cinepanorama
- Corresponsal
- Diga cuando
- Discorama
- Disneylandia
- En directo
- Escolanía
- Eurofestival
- El campo
- El impacto invisible
- El mensaje
- El mundo en que vivimos
- El rebelde
- El último encuentro
- El pastro de Alams
- El programa de la mañana
- En antena
- Encuesta
- Eurofestival
- Graderío
- Hollywood a través del tiempo
- Imperio
- Información cultural
- La edad de amar
- La hora de la verdad
- La muralla de oro
- La tiniebla y la esperanza
- Lección de ocio
- Llamada al corazón
- Los lunes con Ángel
- Los misterios del rosario
- La noche al hablar
- Mañana puede ser verdad
- Microrama
- Minutos musicales
- Noche de estrellas
- Nuestro amigo el libro
- La Olimpiada del saber
- La Poesía
- La vida en 3 dimensiones
- Para vosotras
- Perfil de la semana
- Pobre diablo
- Por tierra, mar y aire
- ¡Que usted lo pase bien!
- ¿Quién es quién?
- Reportaje de toros
- Reina por un día
- Revista para la mujer
- Ronda de España
- Rumbo a lo desconocido
- Rueda de prensa
- Sábado 64
- Sala de concierto
- Seis mujeres en la vida de un hombre
- Solo una mujer
- Sonría, por favor
- Teatro de hoy
- Teatro de la juventud
- Tele-club
- Teledeporte
- Teletipos
- Temas de nuestro tiempo
- Tercer grado
- Testimonio
- Trofeo
- La unión hace la fuerza
- Un actor para un crimen
- Viaje por España
- Voy a contaros un caso
- XXV años de paz

== Television shows ==
- Telediario (1957- )
- Teatro de familia (1959-1965)
- Primer aplauso (1959-1966)
- Tengo un libro en las manos (1959-1966)
- Escala en hi-fi (1961-1967)
- Tortuga perezosa, La (1961-1968)
- Primera fila (1962-1965)
- Ésta es su vida (1962-1968)
- Novela (1962-1979)
- Confidencias (1963-1965)
- En antena (1963-1965)
- Escuela de maridos (1963-1965)
- Estudio 3 (1963-1965)
- Foro TV (1963-1965)
- ¿Quién es quién? (1963-1965)
- Salto a la fama (1963-1965)
- Sonría, por favor (1963-1965)
- Teledomingo (1963-1965)
- Tras la puerta cerrada (1963-1965)
- Visado para el futuro (1963-1965)
- Punto de vista (1963-1966)
- Revista para la mujer (1963-1967)
- Edición especial (1963-1969)
- Fin de semana (1963-1970)
- Panorama de actualidad (1963-1970)

== Ending this year ==
- Fiesta brava (1959-1964)
- Gran parada (1959-1964)
- Gran teatro (1960-1964)
- Amigos del martes (1961-1964)
- Academia TV (1962-1964)
- Aventura de la música, La (1963-1964)
- Barquito de papel, El (1963-1964)
- Campeones (1963-1964)
- Concertino (1963-1964)
- Enigma (1963-1964)
- Fernández, punto y coma (1963-1964)
- Graderío (1963-1964)
- Hombre, ese desconocido, El (1963-1964)
- ¿Quién tiene la palabra? (1963-1964)
- Ronda de España (1963-1964)

== Foreign series debuts in Spain ==
- McHale's Navy (Barco a la vista) (USA)
- The Dick Powell Show (Dick Powell) (USA)
- The Dick Van Dyke Show (USA)
- Top Cat (Don Gato) (USA)
- Dr. Kildare (Doctor Kildare) (USA)
- Cheyenne (USA)
- Fireball XL5 (El Capitán Marte y el XL5) (UK)
- The Virginian (El virginiano) (USA)
- The Untouchables (Los intocables) (USA)
- The Yogi Bear Show (El oso Yogi) (USA)
- The Patty Duke Show (USA)
- The Bugs Bunny Show (USA)
- The DuPont Show with June Allyson (USA)

== Births ==
- 6 January - Inka Martí, hostess.
- 11 January - Ramón Arangüena, host.
- 8 March - Silvia Marsó, actress.
- 1 May - Paco Tous, actor.
- 3 May - Maru Valdivieso, actress.
- 13 May - Jordi Sánchez, actor.
- 29 May - Christina Rosenvinge, singer and hostess.
- 25 June - Emma Suárez, actress.
- 26 August - Silvia Espigado, actress.
- 1 September - Almudena Ariza, journalist.
- 3 September - Elena Martín, actress and comedian.
- 10 September - Ginés García Millán, actor.
- 13 September - Ana García Lozano, hostess.
- 14 October - Pere Ponce, actor.
- 21 October - Gloria Serra, journalist.
- 7 November - Juan Pedro Valentín, journalist.
- 11 November - Anabel Alonso, actress.
- Álex Casanovas, actor.
- Benjamin Barrington, host.
- Marisa Martín Blázquez, journalist.
- Pedro Rollán, actor and host.

== See also ==
- 1964 in Spain
- List of Spanish films of 1964
