= Yale (journalist) =

Spanish journalist and writer

Felipe Navarro García, better known for his nickname Yale (Córdoba, Spain, 14 June 1930 - Toledo, 23 September 1994) was a Spanish journalist and writer.

== Selected works ==
- Estríctamente confidencial (1960), with Tico Medina.
- El paseíllo (1968).
- Raphael Natalia : la boda del silencio (1972).
- La apertura y la apretura (1975).
- El mundo a la pata coja (1975).
- Los últimos cien días: crónica de una agonía (1975).
- El día que perdí... aquello (1976), with Jesús María Amilibia.
- Las españolas sin sostén (1977).
- Jadeos jacarandosos de las jais y los juláis (1978).
- Diccionario del pasota (1979), with Julen Sordo.
- Yalerías de Yale : (el año del consexo) (1979).
- Un reportero a la pata coja : Yale cuenta su vida (1980).
- Los machistas (1980).
- El divorcio es cosa de tres (1981).
- La bragueta nacional : antología del machismo (1983).
