= 1958 in Spanish television =

This is a list of Spanish television related events from 1958.

== Events ==
- 1 January - There are 30.000 television sets in Spain.
- 10 January - Debut of live-show Teatro Apolo, directed by Fernando García de la Vega.
- 13 March - Matías Prats Cañete first appears on TV broadcasting a football match between Spain and France national teams.
- 27 April - Debut of Adventures series Diego Valor, starred by Fernando Delgado.
- May - Concha Velasco first appears on TV, being cast in the life-play The Petrified Forest.
- 12 October - Television first broadcasts in the city of Zaragoza.

== Debuts ==
- Bromas
- Diego Valor.
- Érase una vez
- Escenas de la vida vulgar
- Familias de extraños
- Fila cero.
- Oliverio Twist, with María Fernanda D'Ocón.
- Tu vida pudo ser otra
- A vuelta de correo.
- Aeropuerto Telefunken
- Café cantante.
- Caras nuevas.
- Cita en el estudio.
- Club del sábado
- El enigma
- La Goleta
- Gran Salón
- Hacia la fama
- Juegue con nosotros.
- Juicio Sumarísimo.
- Minuto musical.
- Música a medianoche.
- Nace una canción.
- Preguntas al espacio.
- ¡Qué felices somos!.
- Reto a la vista.
- Sierra, mar...o nada.
- Teatro Apolo.
- El tranvía del humor

== Television shows ==
- Telediario (1957- )

== Ending this year ==
- Cita con la música (1957-1958)
- Cocina (1957-1958)
- Cotilleo al aire libre (1957-1958)
- Entre nosotras (1957-1958)
- Festival Marconi (1957-1958)
- Teatro de la TVE (1957-1958)
- Teatro de la TVE (1957-1958)
- El Tranvía del humor (1957-1958)

== Foreign series debuts in Spain ==
- Investigador Submarino (Sea Hunt)
- Rin Tin Tin (The Adventures of Rin Tin Tin)
- Te quiero Lucy (I Love Lucy)

== Births ==
- 3 January - Carles Francino, journalist.
- 22 January - Jesús Álvarez, sport journalist.
- 12 February - Javier Gurruchaga, showman.
- 17 February - Josep Puigbó, journalist.
- 26 February - María Casal, actress.
- 16 April - Javier Sardà, host.
- 6 May - Lolita Flores, actress and hostess.
- 16 June - Jordi Hurtado, host.
- 12 July - Michael Robinson, host.
- 21 July - Máximo Pradera, host.
- 18 August - Olga Viza, hostess.
- 24 September - Elena Ochoa Foster, hostess.
- 28 September - Inés Ballester, hostess.
- 31 August - Ramón Ibarra, actor.
- 17 October - Melchor Miralles, journalist.
- 28 October - Concha García Campoy, journalist.
- 2 November - Juan Ramón Lucas, host.
- 10 December - Pío Cabanillas Alonso, director General of RTVE.
- 16 December - Rody Aragón, host.
- 24 December - Janfri Topera, actor.
- 28 December - César Sarachu, actor.

== See also ==
- 1958 in Spain
- List of Spanish films of 1958
