= Carlos Herrera (journalist) =

Spanish radio journalist

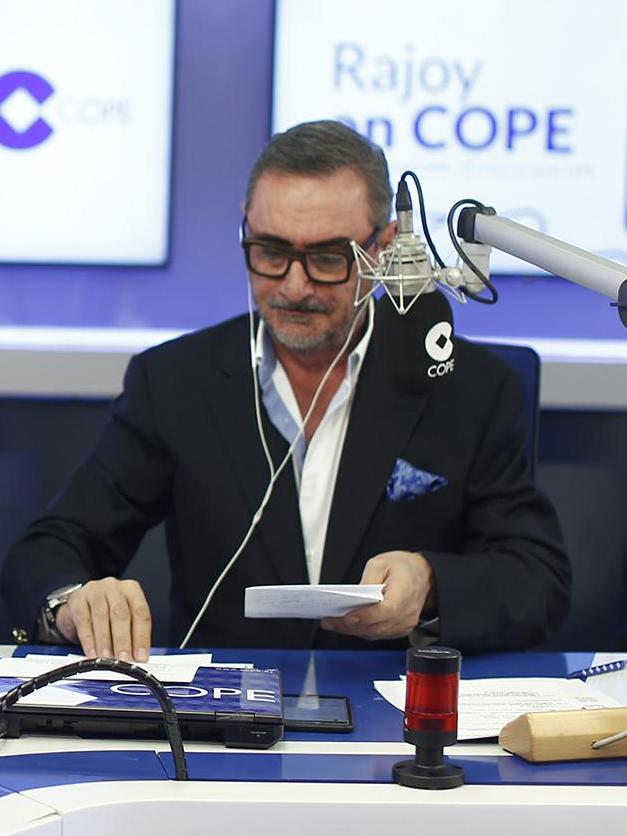
Herrera interviewing prime minister Mariano Rajoy on Cadena COPE in 2017

Carlos Herrera Crusset (born 8 July 1957) is a Spanish radio journalist. He presented the morning programme on Onda Cero for fifteen years before moving to Cadena COPE in 2015.

== Career ==
Herrera was born in Cuevas del Almanzora in the Province of Almería. He earned a medical degree, but has always worked in journalism.

Herrera began presenting on Radio Sevilla in 1977 before moving to Barcelona, where he was on Radio Mataró and Radio Miramar. In 1990 he broadcast to a national audience for the first time, with his show Coplas de mi ser on Cadena SER. He went on to other stations such as Canal Sur, Radio Nacional de España, Onda Cero and Cadena COPE.

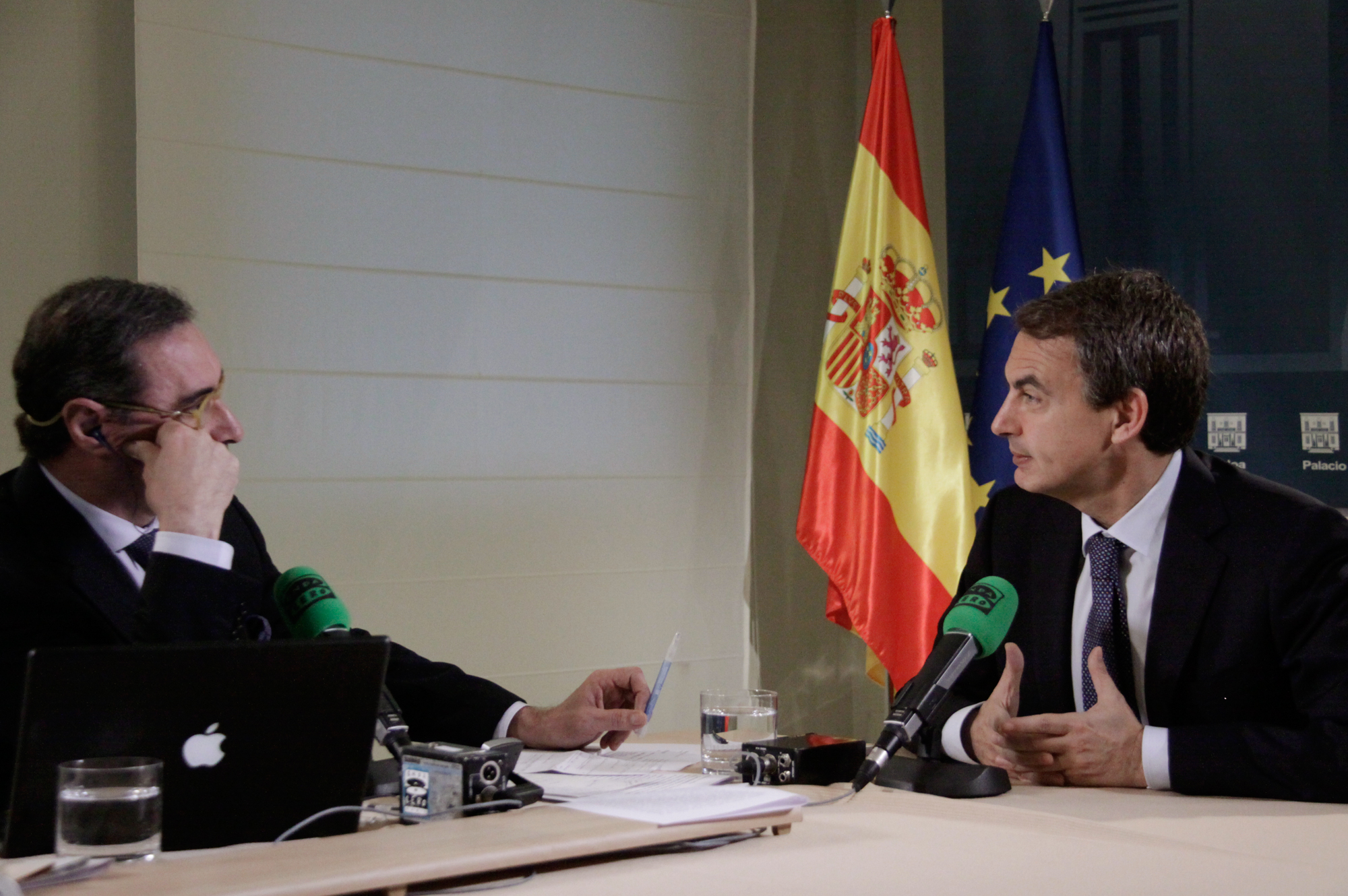
Herrera (left) interviewing prime minister José Luis Rodríguez Zapatero at the Palace of Moncloa in 2011

In March 2015, Herrera ended his 15-year tenure on Onda Cero's morning programme during the radio season. His programme had an audience of two million, behind only Hoy por hoy on Cadena SER. On 1 September that year, he began broadcasting on COPE; guests for his first show were King Juan Carlos I, former prime minister José María Aznar and future prime minister Pedro Sánchez.

In September 2020, Herrera extended his contract at COPE until 2025. In June 2025, this was extended for a further broadcast season, with the channel naming the 2016 United States presidential election, the 2024 Spanish floods and the funeral of Pope Francis as some of his highlights; he had also interviewed the pontiff in September 2021.

Between 2006 and 2007, when he was under contract with Onda Cero, the radio host illegally channeled more than 6.4 million euros through a shell corporation. In July 2023, the Supreme Court of Spain confirmed the sentencing against Herrera for tax evasion.

== Personal life ==
Herrera was given honorary citizenship of his hometown in 1992, where a street was named after him in 2014. He also sponsored renovation of its church and wrote a foreword to an official travel guide. He was a supporter of Almería's successful bid for the 2005 Mediterranean Games.

Herrera was a fan of FC Barcelona, the team supported by his father. He publicly disavowed them due to their support for the Catalan independence movement and stated his support for Seville-based Real Betis.

Herrera was married for 20 years to television presenter Mariló Montero before separating in 2011. They had a son and a daughter. Their daughter became a model, taking her father's maternal surname Crusset for her professional life.

On 5 December 2022, Herrera married fellow journalist Pepa Gea at the Spanish consulate in New York. The event was only attended by their respective children and was not announced to the public for several weeks.

Herrera had a cameo on the Spanish sitcom 7 vidas. In October 2021, he received an honorary doctorate from the European University of Madrid.
