= 1962 in Spanish television =

This is a list of Spanish television related events from 1962.

== Events ==
- 20 July: Roque Pro os appointed Director General of RTVE.
- 3 October: TV show Ésta es su vida, debuts on TVE and becomes one of the most successful TV programs in the History of Spanish Television.
- 31 December: First time Twelve Grapes are broadcast on TV.

== Debuts ==
- Mi hijo y yo
- Novela
- Primera fila
- Silencio, vivimos
- Tercero izquierda
- Academia TVE
- Amigos del lunes
- Aventuras de campeón
- Bazar
- Buenas tardes con música
- Calidoscopio
- Canciones de sus recuerdos
- Canciones para su recuerdo
- Capitán de puerto
- Charlas de invierno
- Charlas de primavera
- Charlas de verano
- Ciencia y vida
- Cine para todos
- De 500 a 500.000
- Desfile de estrellas
- Día a día
- Dos en uno
- El Destino
- El falso mendigo
- El haragan
- El hombre, ese desconocido
- Enviado especial
- Escuela de matrimonios
- Estación de servicio
- Ésta es su vida
- Esta noche...
- Estrellas en 625 líneas
- Fiesta con nosotros
- Foro TV
- Francés para todos
- Inglés para todos
- Información taurina
- La flecha azul
- La novela del lunes
- La opinión de ustedes
- La ruta del Sol
- La Zarzuela
- Leocadia mira al porvenir
- Los ángeles azules
- Los cinco últimos minutos
- Misión secreta
- Noticiario de arte
- Orientación profesional
- Paz en la Tierra
- Peña deportiva
- Pequeño teatro
- Piel de España
- Plaza de España
- ¡Premio!
- ¡Qué vida más loca!
- Ráfagas musicales
- Ritmo
- Sábados Gigantes
- Sesión de noche
- Siempre hay una canción
- Silla de pista
- Teatro de la familia
- Teatro francés
- Telepequediario
- Telesainete
- Viaje con la música
- Vuelta a España en 30 minutos

== Television shows ==
- Telediario (1957- )
- Pantalla deportiva (1959-1963)
- Fiesta brava (1959-1964)
- Gran parada (1959-1964)
- Teatro de familia (1959-1965)
- Primer aplauso (1959-1966)
- Tengo un libro en las manos (1959-1966)
- Panorama (1960-1963)
- Gran teatro (1960-1964)
- Sí o no (1961-1963)
- Amigos del martes (1961-1964)
- Escala en hi-fi (1961-1967)
- Tortuga perezosa, La (1961-1968)

== Ending this year ==
- Fila cero (1958-1962)
- Analía Gadé nos cuenta (1961-1962)
- Gane su viaje (1961-1962)
- Silencio, se rueda (1961-1962)

== Foreign series debuts in Spain ==
- Bonanza (USA)
- King of Diamonds (Rey de diamantes) (USA)
- The Adventures of William Tell (Guillermo Tell) (UK).
- The Defenders (Los Defensores) (USA)
- Checkmate (Ajedrez fatal) (USA)
- Follow the Sun (La ruta del sol) (USA)
- Markham (USA)
- Mister Ed (USA)
- Bachelor Father (Papá soltero) (USA)
- Sugarfoot (USA)
- The Loretta Young Show (El show de Loretta Young) (USA)

== Births ==
- 2 January - Carmelo Gómez, actor.
- 20 February - Hilario Pino, host.
- 4 March - Miriam Díaz-Aroca, actress and hostess.
- 17 March - Juana Cordero, actress.
- 24 March -María Bouzas, actress.
- 6 April - Alejandra Grepi, actress.
- 16 May - Nuria González, actress.
- 19 May - Frances Ondiviela, actress.
- 10 June - Fernando Olmeda, journalist.
- 16 June - Carmen Hornillos, hostess.
- 28 July - Pablo Carbonell, host.
- 2 August - Vicky Larraz, singer and hostess.
- 14 August - Pilar Torres, actress.
- 24 August - Marta Valverde, hostess and actress.
- 15 September - Goyo González, host.
- 22 October - Pocholo Martínez Bordiú, host.
- 27 November - Carlos Lozano, host.
- 11 December - Mario Picazo, meteorologist and host.
- 15 December - Juan y Medio, host.

== See also ==
- 1962 in Spain
- List of Spanish films of 1962
