= 1960 in Spanish television =

This is a list of Spanish television related events from 1960.

== Events ==
- 25 January - Live Theatre show Gran Teatro debuts with the play, En Flandes se ha puesto el sol by Eduardo Marquina.
- 18 May - TVE broadcasts the final of the 1959–60 European Cup between Real Madrid and Eintracht Frankfurt.
- 15 December: Life broadcasting by TVE of Baudouin of Belgium y the spaniard Fabiola de Mora y Aragón wedding, commented by Eduardo Sancho and Federico Gallo, becomes quite an event in the country.

== Debuts ==
- Acuda al doctor.
- Álvaro y su mundo.
- Así terminó.
- El detective Martínez
- Gran teatro
- Holmes and Company
- Mientras ellos trabajan
- Mujeres solas.
- La otra vida de López
- Tercero derecha
- Una pareja cualquiera
- Adivine su vida
- Artes plásticas
- Aula 1
- Cada miércoles un problema
- Cada semana
- Campeones
- Carrusel
- Cinco duros por segundo
- Cine-Fórum
- Club del martes
- Con el código en la mano
- La copa
- Cuando ellas veranean
- Cuarta dimensión
- Cuestiones Bíblicas
- Diario de a bordo
- La España contemporánea
- El cine en casa
- El cine y su mundo
- El mundo de los animales
- El peligro es mi ofiicio
- España en verano
- Estadio
- Estudio galerías
- Estilo
- Estudio fotográfico
- Festival
- Fantasía
- Foro 7
- Gane con Omo
- Hazañas del espacio
- Hoy dirige...
- Intermedio musical
- Interpol
- Kermesse TVE
- La aventura de la música
- La familia por dentro
- La hora del café
- Las letras pagan
- La montaña de luz
- Lanceros de Bengala
- La soltera y su oficio
- La subasta
- Legión extranjera
- Llegó el domingo
- Los cipreses creen en Dios
- Matrícula de Honor
- Mientras ellos trabajan
- Miscelánea
- Música para el hogar
- Pánico
- Panorama
- Primera División
- Primer éxito
- Quermese
- ¿Quién dijo la verdad?
- Recreo
- Reportajes
- Ritmos en cadena
- Salón del Prado
- Siete días
- Teatro Real
- Tercera página
- Tele-Revista
- Tercero derecha
- Tiovivo
- Una pareja cualquiera
- Universidad TV
- Vidas con pentagrama

== Television shows ==
- Telediario (1957- )
- Fila cero (1958-1962)
- Pantalla deportiva (1959-1963)
- Fiesta brava (1959-1964)
- Gran parada (1959-1964)
- Teatro de familia (1959-1965)
- Primer aplauso (1959-1966)
- Tengo un libro en las manos (1959-1966)

== Ending this year ==
- Teatro Apolo (158-1960)
- Club Miramar (1959-1960)
- Galería de esposas (1959-1960)
- Galería de maridos (1959-1960)
- Hogar, dulce hogar (1959-1960)
- Palma y Don Jaime (1959-1960)

== Foreign series debuts in Spain ==
- The New Adventures of Charlie Chan (Charlie Chan)
- Fury
- Huckleberry Hound
- Jungle Jim (Jim de la selva)
- Lassie (La perra Lassie)
- Whirlybirds (Pájaros de acero)
- Perry Mason.
- The Life of Riley(Viviendo con Riley)

== Births ==
- 1 January - Francis Lorenzo, host and actor.
- 1 February - Mariano Peña, actor
- 23 February - Luisa Martín, actress
- 26 February - Kiko Matamoros, pundit
- 2 April - Luis Fernando Alvés, actor
- 22 April - José Antonio Abellán, host
- 7 May - Kim Manning, actress
- 8 May - Jorge Roelas, actor.
- 28 May - Pastora Vega, actress and hostess
- 6 June - Lola Forner, actress
- 20 June - Alessandro Lecquio, pundit
- 29 July - J.J. Santos, sport journalist
- 11 August - Carlos Sobera, host
- 15 September - Carmen Conesa, actress
- 21 September - César Cadaval, comedian
- 4 October - Ramón Pellicer, journalist
- 8 October - Lorenzo Milá, host
- 7 December - Violeta Cela, actress
- 12 December - Lydia Lozano, journalist
- Elena Markínez, journalist
- Eva Nasarre, hostess

== See also ==
- 1960 in Spain
- List of Spanish films of 1960
