= Àngel Casas =

Spanish journalist (1946–2022)

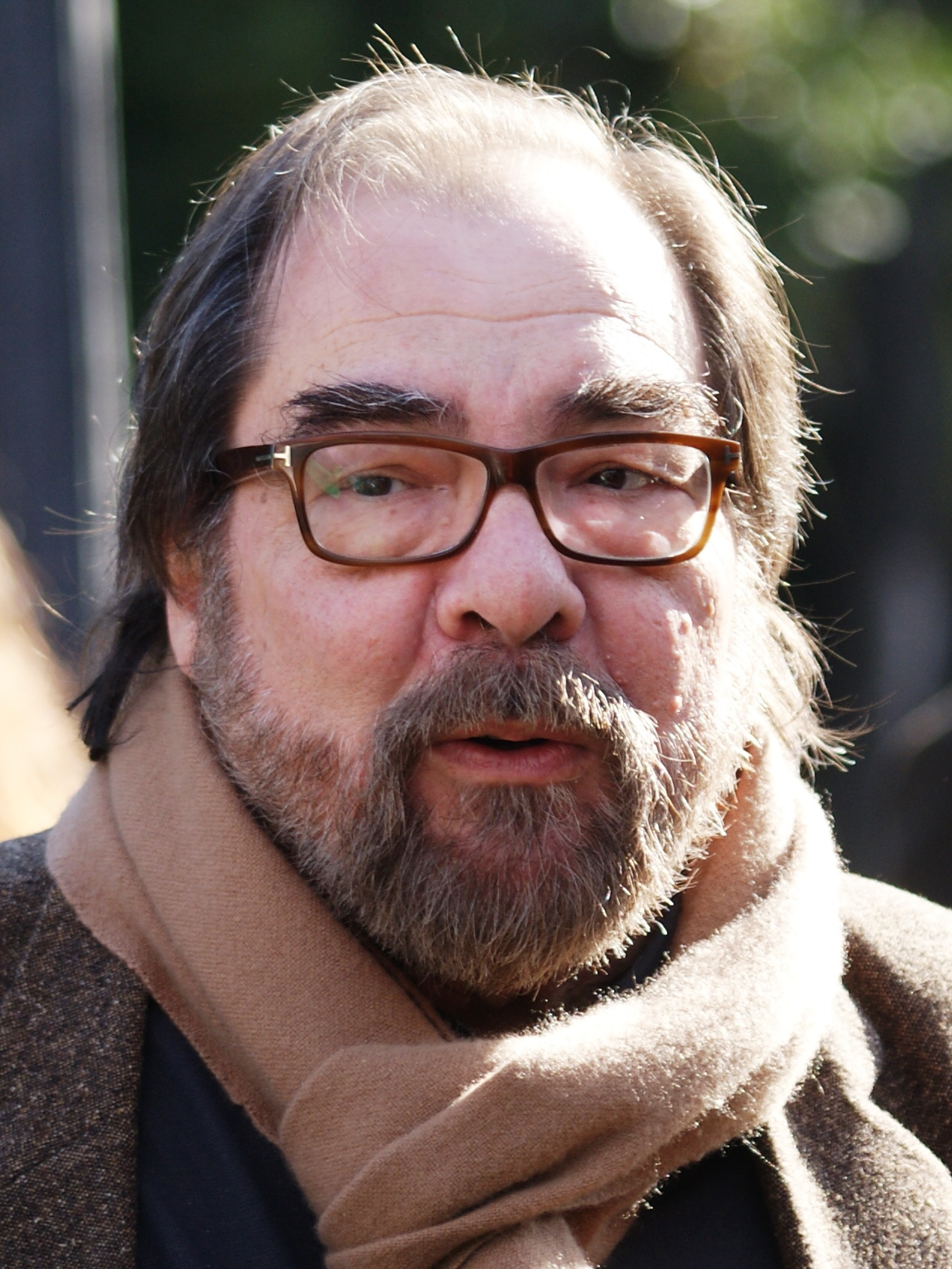
- Casas in 2012
- Born: Àngel Casas i Mas; 17 April 1946; Barcelona, Spain
- Died: 1 October 2022 (aged 76); Barcelona, Spain
- Occupation(s): Journalist, writer

Àngel Casas i Mas (17 April 1946 – 1 October 2022) was a Spanish journalist and writer.

== Biography ==
Casas began his career at Radio Juventud, then moved to Radio Barcelona. Among the programs he presented was Trotadiscos, which won a Premios Ondas in 1972. In the same year, he published the book 45 revolutions in Spain, a sociological and musical analysis of the sixties.

In 1978, Casas worked at Radio 4 on one of the first Catalan-language programmes La clau i el duro, in which he described locations in Barcelona. He started working in television in 1977, under the guidance of Carlos Tena and Diego A. Manrique, on the musical program Popgrama, on Televisión Española. After that, Casas presented and directed his own programme on La 1 and NME from 1980 to 1983.

In 1984, when Televisió de Catalunya started broadcasting, Casas worked there and became the star of the channel with his own program Àngel Casas Show, a talk show that remained on the screen until 1988. The programme earned him the 1984 Golden Antenna Award and also a Premios Ondas. He was hired to work at the Cadena SER to help present the magazine El sermón. He served as the director for Barcelona Televisió from 2008 to 2014, but retired due to ill health.

In 2020, he had a kidney transplant and subsequently suffered from calciphylaxis, which resulted in the amputation of both of his legs. He was honored with the Creu de Sant Jordi for his known work. Casas died on 1 October 2022 in Barcelona, at the age of 76.
