= 1956 in Spanish television =

This is a list of Spanish television related events from 1956.

== Events ==
- 28 October: Televisión Española is launched. First television service in Spain.

== Debuts ==
- A las diez en mi barrio.
- Desde mi butaca.
- Las Gomas.
- Imagen de una vida.

== Births ==
- 12 January – Ana Rosa Quintana, journalist, hostess.
- 15 January – Bermúdez, host.
- 15 January – José Antonio Álvarez Gundín, journalist.
- 4 April – Norma Duval, hostess.
- 26 April – Imanol Arias, actor.
- 1 July – Ernesto Sáenz de Buruaga, journalist.
- 12 August – Mikel Lejarza, producer and director.
- Antonio San José, journalist.
- Izaskun Azurmendi, actress and hostess.

== See also ==
- 1956 in Spain
- List of Spanish films of 1956
