= Alfredo Urdaci =

Spanish journalist (born 1959)

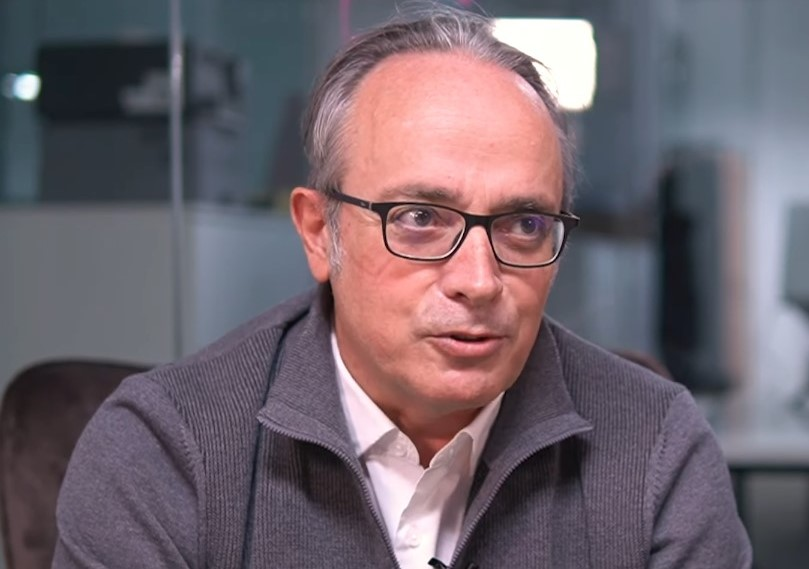
- Alfredo Urdaci in 2022
- Born: 22 December 1959 (age 66); Spain
- Occupation: Journalist

Alfredo Urdaci (born 22 December 1959) is a Spanish journalist. He currently appears on the program El gato al agua on Intereconomía Televisión. From 2000 to 2004 he was Director of News Services for Television España (TVE), and from 2014 and 2017 he was Director of News Services for TV 13.

== Early life and education ==
Urdaci received a degree in Information Science from the University of Navarre in 1983 and a degree in Philosophy and Letters at the Complutense University of Madrid.

== Career ==
=== Diario 16 ===
After receiving his philosophy degree, Urdaci began his career as a journalist for the now defunct Diario 16.

=== Rome correspondent ===
In 1985 Urdaci became the Rome correspondent for Spanish National Radio.

=== TVE ===
In August 1998, Urdaci was named Deputy News Director at TVE and presenter on the second edition of Telediario.

In 1999 he hosted the first annual gala of the Spanish Television Academy.

In May 2000, he was appointed by Javier González Ferrari as News Director at TVE, while at the same time staying on as presenter of Telediario 2.

While Urdaci was News Director, the Workers' Commissions (Comisiones Obreras, CC.OO.), Spain's largest trade union, accused TVE of manipulating news reports to favor the government before and during the 2002 general strike, which took place while José María Aznar was president. In compliance with a judge's order, Urdaci read an official correction on the air, but CC.OO. complained that he had read the correction too fast and read the union's acronym instead of its full name. The judge, however, was satisfied.

Between October 2003 and April 2004, while continuing to appear on Telediario, Urdaci served as presenter on Debate de la 2, alternating in that role with Luis Herrero. In 2003, he co-hosted the news with Letizia Ortiz, now Queen of Spain, but she left that job when her engagement to Prince Felipe was made public.

=== Atocha atrocity ===
After the terrorist attacks of 11 March 2004, Urdaci was accused of following the orders of the ruling party by attributing them to ETA and not to Al Qaeda. When the results of the 14 March election was announced, people at Socialist Party campaign headquarters could be heard on live TV chanting slogans against Urdaci. On 16 April the Socialist standard bearer José Luis Rodríguez Zapatero took office as Prime Minister; four days later Urdaci was dismissed as host of Telediario 2. On 26 April Lorenzo Milá, formerly host of La 2 Noticias, was named as his replacement. Urdaci was invited to host an interview series for TVE, but he rejected the offer, since the program in question would be broadcast abroad only, not in Spain.

=== After TVE ===
After leaving TVE, Urdaci collaborated sporadically with other television networks, appearing, for example, on the show Flo's Club on the laSexta network in 2006. In July 2006 he joined the Vocento Group and became host of the late-night newsmagazine program Locos x Madrid on Onda 6. He has also appeared on Telecinco programs and worked as a talk-show host. In 2007 he served as a commentator on such programs as Espejo público (Public Mirror, 2006–2007) on Antena 3; El programa de Ana Rosa (2005–2008), Sábado Dolce Vita (2006–2007), ES6 La noria (2007–2009), and La mirada crítica (The Critical Look, 2008).

He also appeared on various radio programs, worked as an advisor to various media organizations, was director of communications for the Lexland Sport law firm, and wrote a column for Ahora.

Urdaci has written several books. Días de ruido y furia (Days of noise and fury), published in 2005, recounts the latter part of his tenure as a news director at TVE. After a complaint by journalist Fernando G. Delgado, the book was withdrawn; subsequently, Urdaci acknowledged that he had incorrectly described Delgado in the book as having made certain statements on Election Day, 14 March 2004, and agreed to remove the offending passages from future editions.

From January 2009 to October 2013, he served as Press Manager for the real estate developer Francisco Hernando, known as El Pocero.

In October 2013, Urdaci announced the formation of his own communications company, Ludiana Bluefields, which he said would, among other things, produce television programs and provide communications consulting services. The firm now has branches in Mexico City, São Paulo, and Baghdad.

In January and February 2014, he worked on the program Abre los ojos.

=== 13TV ===
From March to July 2014, Urdaci appeared on the program La marimorena on 13 TV. On 29 July 2014 he was named News Director at 13TV and became host of the second edition of Al Día, the network's main news program. In April 2017, it was announced that he would also host a new half-hour political humor program for 13TV entitled La contra. The program began broadcasting on 3 May 2017 and had its last broadcast on 3 July.

=== Telecinco ===
In 2017–18, he appeared on Sábado Deluxe on Telecinco; in 2017, he appeared on Mad in Spain on the same network. His book Manual urgente de comunicación was published in 2018.

== Honors and awards ==
In 1983 Urdaci received the Premio Especial Fin de Carrera from the Minister of Education. In 1995, his Rome reportage won him the Premio del Club Internacional de Prensa for Best Foreign Coverage. In 2000, he received the TV Academy's award for Best TV News Program for the second edition of Telediario. He has also received the Reading Promotion Award from the Association of Editors; the Golden Antenna (2000, 2016), and the Silver Antenna (2006).

== Personal life ==
Urdaci is married to María Jesús Vallejo de Blas.

He is fluent in Italian, English, French, and Arabic.
