= Mariló Montero =

Spanish journalist and television presenter

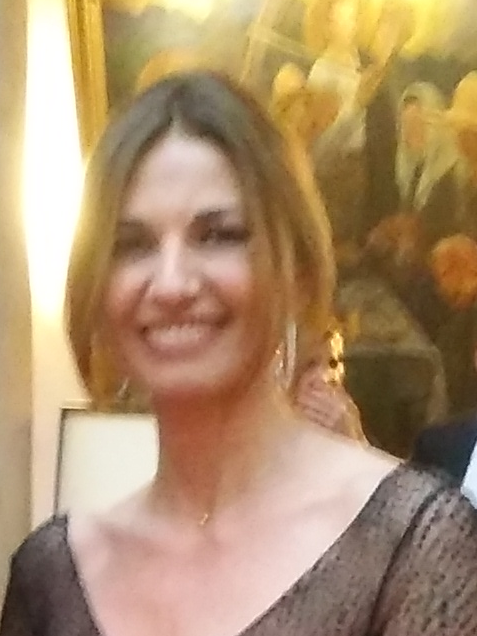
- Born: María Dolores Leonor Montero Abárzuza; 28 July 1965 (age 61); Estella-Lizarra, Spain
- Occupations: Journalist, television presenter
- Years active: 1985–present
- Spouse: Carlos Herrera (m. 1991; div. 2011)
- Children: 2

María Dolores Leonor "Mariló" Montero Abárzuza (born 28 July 1965) is a Spanish journalist and television presenter. She was a presenter of La mañana de La 1 of TVE from 2009 to 2016.
