= 1966 in Spanish television =

This is a list of Spanish television related events from 1966.

== Events ==
- 24 June: Historias para no dormir episode El asfalto directed by de Narciso Ibáñez Serrador wins the Golden Nymph Award in the Monte-Carlo Television Festival.
- 15 November: La 2 by Televisión Española is launched. Second television service in Spain.

== Debuts ==
- La 1
- Diego Acevedo
- Los encuentros
- Habitación 508
- Hermenegildo Pérez, para servirle
- Nosotras y ellos
- La pequeña comedia
- Teatro breve
- El tercer rombo
- El alma se serena
- Aquí España
- Biblioteca juvenil
- Cartas de las provincias
- Ciencias para la vida
- The Chiripitiflauticos
- Club mediodía
- El cohete
- Conozca usted España
- ¿Cuál es tu final?
- Danzas de España
- Día de fiesta
- Diga 33
- Escuela de campeones
- España al día
- Figuras en su mundo
- Las fronteras de la ciencia
- Galería de solistas
- Gran premio
- Habitación 508
- Historias de ayer y de hoy
- El hombre de mundo
- Hombres y tierras
- Hombres que dejan huella
- Historia de la fotografía
- Historias de la paz
- Hombres en crisis
- Horizontes
- Imagen del ayer
- Imágenes para saber
- Jardilín
- Juegos y juguetes
- Kilómetro lanzado
- La llamada al diálogo
- La pequeña comedia
- Lecciones de cosas
- Noche del sábado
- El que dice ser y llamarse
- Kilómetro lanzado
- El lápiz mágico
- Los libros
- Llamada al diálogo
- Media hora con...
- Meditación
- Misterios al descubierto
- Momento cultural
- Mundo de hoy
- Musical
- La música
- Noches de verano
- Nuestro tiempo
- Nueva generación
- Nueva geografía
- Los números
- La palabra más larga
- Panorama de actualidad
- La pesca
- Por los caminos de España
- Programa extraordinario
- Protagonista, el hombre
- Revista agraria
- La risa nueva
- Saber elegir
- Salta a la vista
- Sesenta y siete
- Siete preguntas al concilio
- Símbolos y ritos
- Siglo XXI
- Tele-Ritmo
- Tendido 13
- Tiempo atrás
- Trece por Dieciocho
- El tiempo para el campo
- TVE es noticia
- Una pista en la ciudad
- Ventana al mundo
- La 2
- Dichoso mundo
- Teatro de siempre
- Telecomedia de humor
- 1+1=3 y sobra 1
- A todo gas
- Ateneo
- Autores invitados
- Cine-Club
- Enviado especial
- Estudio en negro
- Fiesta
- Gama
- Hoy es noticia
- El juego de la oca
- Luces en la noche
- Luz verde
- Mañana es sábado
- Mesa redonda
- Música en la intimidad
- El mundo del deporte
- Pantalla grande
- Sospecha
- Suplemento semanal
- Concurso náutico
- Conexión

== Television shows ==
=== La 1 aired ===
- Telediario (1957- )
- Escala en hi-fi (1961-1967)
- Tortuga perezosa, La (1961-1968)
- Ésta es su vida (1962-1968)
- Novela (1962-1979)
- Revista para la mujer (1963-1967)
- Edición especial (1963-1969)
- Fin de semana (1963-1970)
- Panorama de actualidad (1963-1970)
- Séneca, El (1964-1970)
- A toda plana (1965-1967)
- Musical 14,05 (1965-1967)
- Noche del sábado (1965-1968)
- Tema para el debate, Un (1965-1968)
- Historias para no dormir (1965-1970)
- Antena infantil (1965-1971)
- Ayer domingo (1965-1971)
- Estudio 1 (1965-1985)

== Ending this year ==
=== La 1 ending ===
- Primer aplauso (1959-1966)
- Tengo un libro en las manos (1959-1966)
- Punto de vista (1963-1966)
- Reina por un día (1964-1966)
- Tele-club (1964-1966)
- Unión hace la fuerza, La (1964-1966)
- El que dice ser y llamarse (1965-1966)
- ¿Quién dice la verdad? (1965-1966)
- Rueda de prensa (1965-1966)

=== La 2 ending ===
- Aquí el segundo programa (1965-1966)
- Arte y artistas (1965-1966)

== Foreign series debuts in Spain ==
=== La 1 foreign debuts ===
- Run for Your Life (Alma de acero) (USA)
- Bourbon Street Beat (Bourbon Street) (USA)
- The Rogues (Los bribones) (USA)
- Daniel Boone (USA)
- The Time Tunnel (El túnel del tiempo) (USA)
- Thunderbirds (Guardianes del espacio) (UK)
- Kentucky Jones (USA)
- Gilligan's Island (La isla de Gilligan) (USA)
- The Jetsons (Los supersónicos) (USA)
- Get Smart (El Superagente 86) (USA)
- I Spy (Yo soy espía) (USA)

=== La 2 foreign debuts ===
- Burke's Law (Agente Burke) (USA)
- M Squad (Ballinger de Chicago) (USA)
- The Richard Boone Show (USA)
- Honey West (La rubia peligrosa) (USA)
- The Outer Limits (Rumbo a lo desconocido) (USA)

== Births ==
- 22 January – Víctor Arribas, journalist.
- 2 February – Emma Ozores, actress.
- 13 March – Marcial Álvarez, actor.
- 23 March – Belén Rodríguez, pundit.
- 1 April – Gerardo Garrido, actor.
- 26 May – Félix Álvarez, host.
- 13 June – Luis Merlo, actor.
- 21 June – Leticia Sabater, hostess.
- 5 July – Juanma Ortega, host.
- 31 August – Juncal Rivero, hostess.
- 5 September – Achero Mañas, actor.
- 10 September – Josep Pedrerol, host.
- 13 September – Francine Gálvez, hostess.
- 1 October – Loreto Valverde, hostess.
- 1 October – Nina, singer.
- 22 October – Fran Llorente, journalist.
- 30 October – Carmen Borrego, director & pundit.
- 17 December – Paloma Ferre, journalist.
- 22 December – María Pujalte, actress.
- 25 December – Patricia Gaztañaga, hostess.
- Santiago Acosta, host.

== See also ==
- 1966 in Spain
- List of Spanish films of 1966
