= 1963 in Spanish television =

This is a list of Spanish television related events from 1963.

== Events ==
- 22 September: Salomé and Raimon win the Mediterranean Song Contest, with the catalan language song S'en va anar.

== Debuts ==
- Confidencias
- Cuarto de estar
- Desde mi portal
- Las enfermeras
- Enigma
- Escuela de maridos
- Estudio 3
- Fernández, punto y coma
- Firmado Pérez
- Hoy llegó la primavera
- Platea
- Rosi y los demás
- Sospecha
- Tras la puerta cerrada
- La aventura de la música
- El barquito de papel
- Bazar
- Buenas tardes con música
- Cada semana una historia
- Campeones
- Canciones infantiles
- Cita con el humor
- Concertino
- La Copa
- De 500 a 500.000
- Día a día
- Edición especial
- En antena
- Estrellas en 625 líneas
- Fin de semana
- Foro TV
- Graderío
- El hombre, ese desconocido
- No se quede sin saberlo
- Noticiario femenino
- La Nueva geografía
- Panorama de actualidad
- Punto de vista
- ¿Quién es quién?
- ¿Quién tiene la palabra?
- Revista para la mujer
- Ronda de España
- Salto a la fama
- Sonría, por favor
- Sólo para hombres
- Teledomingo
- Tercer grado
- Visado para el futuro

== Television shows ==
- Telediario (1957- )
- Fiesta brava (1959-1964)
- Gran parada (1959-1964)
- Teatro de familia (1959-1965)
- Primer aplauso (1959-1966)
- Tengo un libro en las manos (1959-1966)
- Gran teatro (1960-1964)
- Amigos del martes (1961-1964)
- Escala en hi-fi (1961-1967)
- Tortuga perezosa, La (1961-1968)
- Primera fila (1962-1965)
- Ésta es su vida (1962-1968)
- Novela (1962-1979)

== Ending this year ==
- Pantalla deportiva (1959-1963)
- Panorama (1960-1963)
- Escuela TV (1961-1963)
- Sí o no (1961-1963)
- Canciones para su recuerdo (1962-1963)
- De 500 a 500.000 (1962-1963)
- Mi hijo y yo (1962-1963)
- Piel de España (1962-1963)
- Plaza de España (1962-1963)
- Silencio, vivimos (1962-1963)
- Tercero izquierda (1962-1963)
- Todos los deportes (1962-1963)

== Foreign series debuts in Spain ==
- The Aquanauts (Acuanautas) (USA)
- Bronco (USA)
- Wagon Train (Caravana) (USA)
- Danger Man (Cita con la muerte) (UK)
- Surfside 6 (Rompeolas) (USA)
- Westinghouse Desilu Playhouse (Espejo del destino) (USA)
- The Lone Ranger (El llanero solitario) (USA)
- The Thin Man (Ella, él y Asta) (USA)
- My Three Sons (Mis tres hijos) (USA)
- The Bugs Bunny Show (USA)
- Ripcord (USA)

== Births ==
- 3 January – Marta Calvó, actress.
- 14 January – Rosa María Molló, journalist.
- 22 January – Sergio Sauca, sport journalist.
- 2 February – Gonzalo de Castro, actor.
- 14 February – Elisenda Roca, hostess.
- 12 March – José Luis Fernández, actor.
- 23 March – Miguel Ortiz, actor and host.
- 26 March – Amparo Larrañaga, actress.
- 17 April – Pedro Casablanc, actor.
- 25 April- Mónica Ridruejo, Director General of RTVE.
- 26 April – María del Monte, singer and hostess.
- 3 May – Roberto Cairo, actor.
- 2 June – Pepe Viyuela, actor.
- 12 June – Mari Pau Domínguez, hostess.
- 13 June – Alaska, actress, singer and hostess.
- 15 June – Blanca Portillo, actress.
- 17 June – Daniel Écija, productor.
- 24 June – Antonio Montero, journalist.
- 30 June – Marta Robles, hostess.
- 9 July – Beatriz Cortázar, journalist.
- 10 July – Vicente Vallés, journalist.
- 25 July – Cristina Torres, actress.
- 19 August – Patxi Alonso, host.
- 29 August – Belinda Washington, hostess and actress.
- 3 September – Teresa Viejo, hostess.
- 7 September – Àngels Barceló, journalist.
- 21 September – Carmen Machi, actress.
- 23 September – Sonia Martínez, hostess.
- 26 September – Jordi González, host.
- 30 September – Irma Soriano, hostess.
- 7 October – Concha Galán, hostess.
- 8 October – Jorge Cadaval, comedian.
- 6 November – Bruno Squarcia, actor.
- 26 November – Lydia Bosch, actress and hostess.
- 27 November – Micky Molina, actor.
- 28 November – Fernando Acaso, host.
- 30 November – Pepa Bueno, journalist.
- 12 December – Inmaculada Galván, hostess.
- 19 December – Cristina Marcos, actress.
- Candela Palazón, hostess.
- María San Juan, hostess.
- Montserrat Domínguez, hostess.
- Paloma García-Pelayo, journalist.
- Tonino, comedian.

== See also ==
- 1963 in Spain
- List of Spanish films of 1963
