= Pepe Oneto =

Spanish journalist and writer (1942–2019)

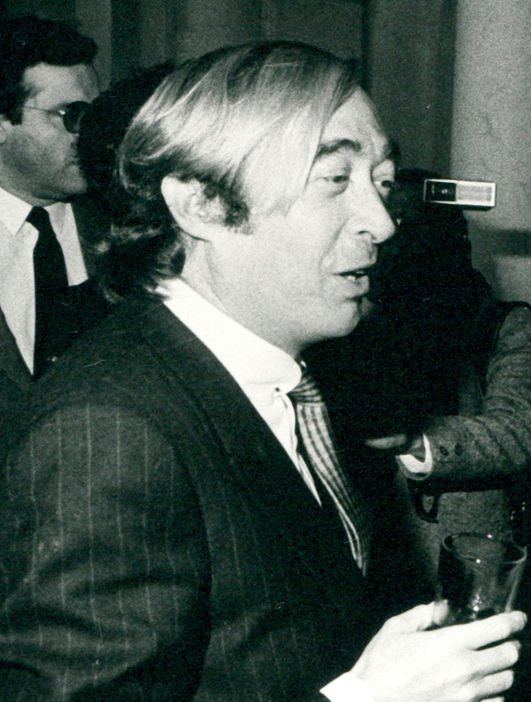
- Oneto speaking with then-Prime Minister Leopoldo Calvo Sotelo in 1981.
- Born: José Manuel Oneto Revuelta; 14 March 1942; San Fernando, Cádiz, Spain
- Died: 7 October 2019 (aged 77); San Sebastián, Spain
- Occupations: Journalist and writer

José Manuel Oneto Revuelta (14 March 1942 – 7 October 2019), better known as Pepe Oneto, was a Spanish journalist and writer; he has been described as one of the greatest journalists during the Spanish transition to democracy.

== Biography ==
Oneto was born in the Andalusian city of San Fernando, Cádiz, on 14 March 1942. He got a degree in Economics and a diploma in Journalism. His professional career began in Diario Madrid in 1961, an anti-Francoist newspaper until its closure in 1971 by the regime.

During the Transition he joined the agencies Agence France-Presse and Colpisa. Through letters, he wrote his political chronicles, which were published by fifteen newspapers, including La Vanguardia. At that time, he worked with the French writer and journalist Jacques Kaufmann who was then a foreign correspondent in Madrid and conducted the first interview of the newly installed King Juan Carlos I.

In 1974 he joined the staff of the magazine Cambio16, becoming its director in 1976. The political magazine at that time became one of the bastions of the informative opening that occurred during the transition, reaching half a million copies. Later he would also be appointed General Director of Publications of Group 16.

In 1986 he joined the Zeta Group, going on to run the magazine Tiempo, until 1996. During that time the publication became one of the most widely published among political content magazines.

He was also Director of Informational at Antena 3 Televisión between 1996 and 1998. In 2000, and again in 2016, he was appointed member of the Board of Directors of Telemadrid.

As a political commentator, he was a regular in the current-affairs gatherings on both radio and on television, having collaborated in the spaces Day by day (1996–2004) and La Mirada Crítica (1999–2002), in Telecinco, Hermida y Cía (1993–1996), Hour H (1996–1997), The first coffee (1996–1998), Every day (2004–2005), Ruedo Ibérico (2004–2006) and Public Mirror (2006–) in Antena 3, Night in 24 hours (2015–2018) on TVE, 4 Herrera on the Wave (2004–2015), More than one (since 2015) and The Compass on Wave Zero.

== Death ==
He died on 7 October 2019 in a hospital in San Sebastián, in Spain's Basque Country, at the age of 77 after entering in August due to peritonitis, which eventually degenerated into sepsis. His death was lamented by journalism and politics of Spain. Prime Minister Pedro Sánchez described him as a "leading journalist".

== Books ==
- Arias between two crises 1973-1975, 1975
- One hundred days in the death of Francisco Franco, 1975
- José María de Areilza, 1977
- The last days of a President: from resignation to the coup d'etat, 1981
- The Night of Tejero, 1981
- Where is Felipe going?, 1983
- Madrid Command, 1984
- The Kidnapping of Change, 1984
- Anatomy of a regime change, 1985
- The truth about the Tejero case: the process of the century, 1985
- Twenty years that changed Spain, 1999
- One hundred days that changed Spain, 2005
- 23 -F. The untold story, 2006

== Awards ==
- Agustín Merello Award 2010.
- National Journalism Award of Spain.
- Golden Antenna of Television.
- I Santiago Castelo Award for the Journalistic Trajectory.
