= Miryam Romero =

Spanish journalist and news anchor (1963–2022)

- Born: Miryam Romero Fernández; 1963; Jaén, Francoist Spain
- Died: 12 June 2022 (aged 58–59); Madrid, Spain
- Education: Colegio Madres Agustinas; Hermanos Maristas; IES Padre Juan de Mariana
- Alma mater: Faculty in the School of Information Technology at Universidad Complutense de Madrid
- Occupations: Journalist and news anchor
- Years active: 1985–2020
- Employer(s): COPE; Atresmedia (1985–1988, 1989–2020); RTVE (1988–1989)
- Spouse: Enric Rodríguez

Miryam Romero Fernández (1963 – 12 June 2022) was a Spanish journalist and news anchor.

== Biography ==
Romero was born in Jaén in 1963; she later moved with her family to Talavera de la Reina (Toledo), at the age of two where she studied at the Colegio Madres Agustinas, a school run by the Hermanos Maristas and then later in the IES Padre Juan de Mariana. Later she received her Bachelor's degree in information science from the Complutense University of Madrid.

She dedicated most of her career to radio and television broadcasting, working on live broadcasts for COPE, Antena 3 Radio (1985–1988) and TVE (1988–1989). While working for Antena 3 (1989–2020) she was the host of Antena 3 Noticias at 3:00 pm since the beginning of the 1990s where she worked with Luis Herrero, Roberto Arce and Pedro Piqueras. Later, she moved to working behind the cameras as editor and subdirector of the 9:00 pm news, hosted by Vicente Vallés until December 2020 when she took an incentivized retirement plan from Atresmedia.

She was married with three children. She died 12 June 2022 in Madrid due to complications associated with leukemia.
