= Don Gato =

Don Gato may refer to:

- "Señor Don Gato", a Spanish children's song
- Don Gato, the Spanish-language adaptation of American TV series Top Cat

== See also ==
- MLW x Don Gato Tequila: Lucha de los Muertos, a 2025 wrestling event
