= Mar Abascal =

Spanish television actress

- Born: 1980 (age 45–46); Madrid, Spain
- Occupation: Actress

Mar Abascal (born 1980) is a Spanish actress, born in the city of Madrid. She is known for Spanish comedy television series Gym Tony.

== Career ==
In 1995, Abascal performed in Zarzuela shows, named as La Magica de la Zarzuela. In 2008, she starred in My first time (2008–2011) by Ken Davenport, along with Javi Martín and Miren Ibarguren. Between December 2014 and April 2016 she was a part of the cast of the television comedy Gym Tony in the role of Pilar Macias.

== Filmography ==
=== Television series ===
Year	Serie	Channel	Character	Notes
2010	Aida	Telecinco	Idoia	1 episode
2014	Gym Tony	Four	Pilar Macias	373 episodes
2017	Gym Tony LC	FDF	Pilar Macias	60 episodes
2018	Medical Center	The 1	Sonia Menjibar	1 episode
2018	Paquita Salas	Netflix	Dori	1 episode
2019	Ladies of AMPA	Telecinco	Embodies	1 episode

=== Television programs ===
Year	Program	Channel	Notes
2016	Stand up all stars	Telecinco	Singing Teacher
2017	I slip	Antenna 3	Contestant

=== Theaters ===
Year	Title	Ref.
2011	Burundanga:The end of a band	
2012	Captain Grant's Nephews	
2017	Event in Congress	
2019	The Call	

=== Short films ===
Year	Title	Ref.
2004	The Prince of Algiers	
2009	Bubble	
2019	Candela	
