= Henrique Cymerman =

Portuguese journalist

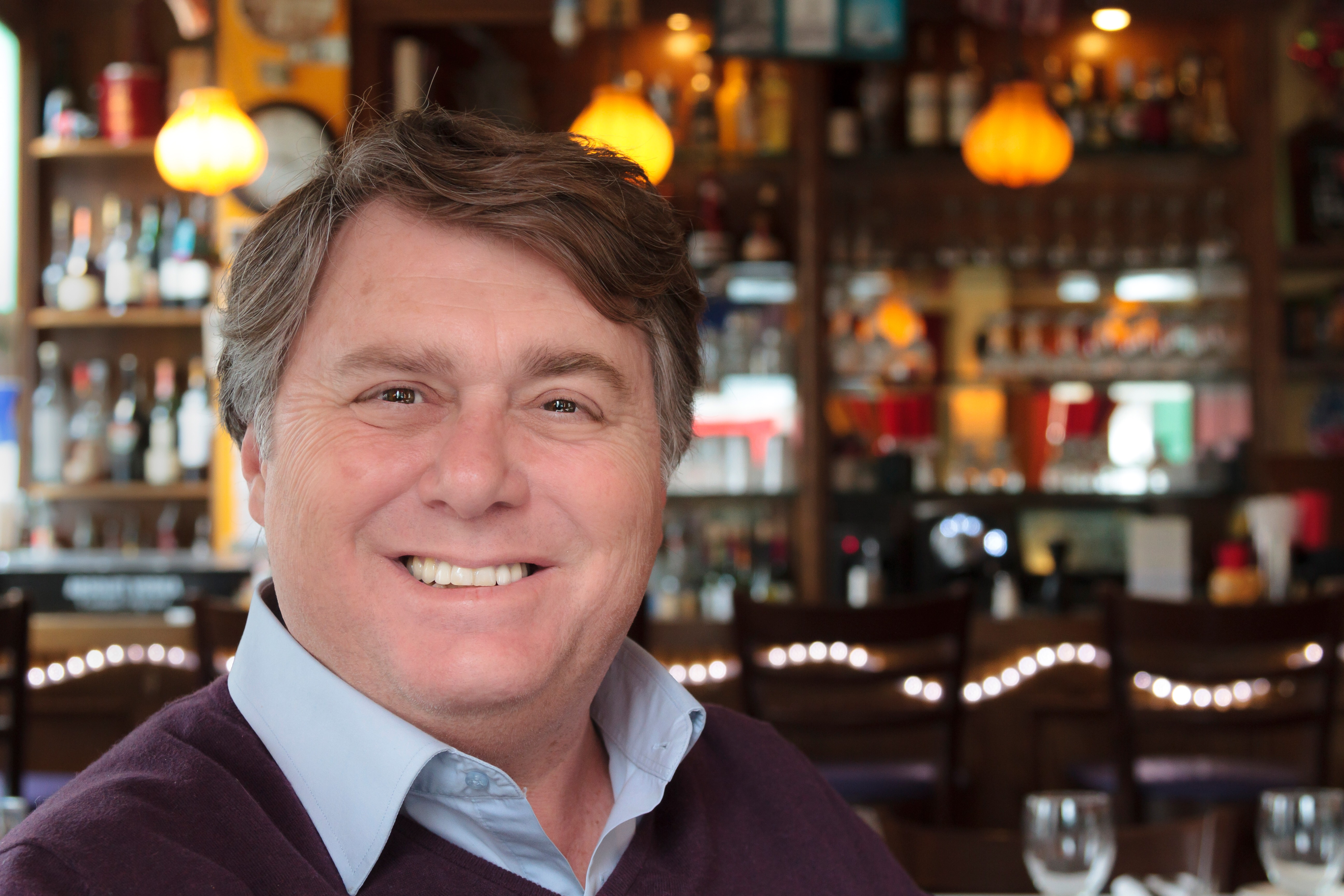
- Born: Henrique Cymerman Benarroch; 23 March 1959 (age 67); Porto, Portugal
- Citizenship: Portugal • Spain • Israel
- Occupations: Journalist, author, director, lecturer
- Known for: his journalistic work in SIC (Portugal), La Vanguardia (Spain), Mediaset España, GloboNews (Brazil), Channel 2 (Israel), I24news in French and English
- Children: 3

Henrique Cymerman Benarroch (born 23 March 1959) is a Portuguese journalist of Spanish, Portuguese and Israeli nationality who works as a correspondent in the Middle East for SIC, La Vanguardia and Mediaset España, among others. He works in five languages: English, Spanish, Portuguese, French and Hebrew. He is the President of the Chamber of Commerce and Industry between Israel and The GCC (Persian Gulf States).

== Biography ==
Cymerman was born in Porto, Portugal to a Portuguese father and a Spanish mother – his father being an Ashkenazi Jew of Polish descent and his mother a Sephardic Jew of Moroccan descent. (Note: Despite being born in Portugal, Henrique has Spanish roots, for his mother was a Sephardic Jew from Málaga.) He decided to move to Israel on his own at age 16. He graduated in Social Science at Tel Aviv University and holds a master's degree in the branches of Political Science and Labor Studies. Years later, he worked as a lecturer in that same center and perfected his knowledge of Hebrew and Arabic until he was hired in 1982 by the Israeli newspaper Maariv to work as a correspondent in the Iberian Peninsula.

In 1991 he started working as a correspondent in the Middle East for the Spanish newspaper La Vanguardia, a job he combined from 1992 onwards with being a correspondent for the Spanish television channel Antena 3. It is in 2014 when Henrique bets for Mediaset España, abandoning Antena 3 after working for them for more than 20 years. Henrique also worked as a correspondent for the Portuguese network SIC and has appeared on numerous occasions on the BBC, as well as in Israeli and Palestinian channels. He was the last person to interview former Israeli Prime Minister Yitzhak Rabin, 24 hours before his assassination.

Henrique Cymerman has covered current affairs in the Middle East for more than 25 years. Over time he has developed many relationships of trust with those heading the chief regional political processes in Israel, the Middle East, and the Arab world, allowing him to serve as a unique bridge between the nations involved in the Arab-Israeli conflict.

During the 2010s, he became the first Israeli journalist in history to do a TV broadcast from Dubai, Abu Dhabi, Qatar, and Saudi Arabia.

Cymerman is also a lecturer on Middle East Studies in the Faculty of Government, Strategy and Diplomacy in the Interdisciplinary Center for Higher Education in Herzliya, Israel.

Between 2005 and 2012, he published the book Voices from the Center of the World: The Arab-Israeli Conflict told by its Protagonists in six languages (Spanish, Portuguese, Hebrew, Arabic, Brazilian edition and English). The book includes interviews with key characters in the region, such as Yasser Arafat; Shimon Peres; Hamas leader Ahmed Yassin; Omar bin Laden, son of Osama bin Laden; Mahmoud Abbas; and Yitzhak Rabin's last interview.

Henrique Cymerman directed the TV documentary series Jihad Now, in which he explores the roots of radical Islam, al-Qaeda and Islamic State. The show aired in 2016.

=== Henrique Cymerman and Pope Francis ===
In June 2013, Henrique Cymerman had a meeting with Pope Francis in which he suggested the Pope visit the Holy Land. (Note: Henrique Cymerman met rabbi Abraham Skorka, a friend of Pope Francis, during a conference on the Middle East that the journalist held in Buenos Aires. Skorka offered to accompany him to see the Pope in order for Cymerman to interview him for a series of documentaries for Israeli TV, because the Pope "wanted to send a message to the Jewish people." That first encounter took place on June 13, 2013, and in that context the Pope asked Henrique Cymerman what he could do for the Middle East. The journalist replied: "…to begin with, visit the area…". Francis asked: "Would you help me?")

Pope Francis’ journey to the Holy Land took place on May 24–26, 2014. Henrique Cymerman, who became an admirer of Pope Francis’ leadership skills, also suggested he organize an encounter between Palestinian President Mahmoud Abbas and Israeli President Shimon Peres, which the Pope proposed turning into a "prayer ceremony" that would take place in "his home," the Vatican, and which both leaders accepted. This offer was immediately qualified by Le Figaro as an unprecedented historical gesture in favor of peace between Israelis and Palestinians. Cymerman sustains that the Middle East is currently going through one of its most difficult moments since the Second Intifada: the peace process promoted by the United States is at an impasse, especially because they never succeeded in bringing together both parties of the conflict and because of their insistence in pursuing a bilateral path instead of adopting a regional approach, wherein Israel would forge alliances with the Sunni Arab States.

Henrique Cymerman coauthored with Jorge Reis-Sá the book Francis: From Rome to Jerusalem (Guerra e Paz, Portugal, 2014), a book that narrates Pope Francis' journey to the Holy Land.

=== Voluntary work ===
Henrique is a member of SOS Children's Villages, an NGO for which he organizes meetings and lectures in order to raise funds. He was also a committee member of the association No2 Violence Against Women. He has been invited to deliver lectures for Taglit, the IDF and Aman, as well as for the IDF's intelligence units and spokesperson's unit, for army preparatory programs and for Israel's ministry of Foreign Affairs. He has also lectured in many international Jewish organizations during his travels visiting Jewish communities all over the world.

== Honours and Distinctions ==
=== Honours ===
- Commander of the Order of Prince Henry (2005)
- Commander of the Order of Civil Merit (2012)

=== Awards ===
- New York Festivals Award in the category Television News Programs and Inserts | Best News Documentary/Special for his documentary report A suicide bomber in the children’s room (1997)
- Daniel Pearl Award by the Anti-Defamation League (2012)
- Godó Award for Journalism (2009)

=== Other accolades ===
- Pope Francis called Henrique Cymerman "angel of peace" and presented him with a low relief engraving of the angel of peace defeating the demon of war for his help in making possible the encounter with Abbas and Peres in the Vatican.
- Since 2008, he has a table in his honor in the dining room of the Academia General del Aire, the military academy of the Spanish air force.
