= Para todos la Dos =

Spanish language television talk show

- Also known as: Para Todos La 2
- Genre: Talk show
- Directed by: Quim Cuixart
- Presented by: Juanjo Pardo; Marta Càceres (Season 2 onwards); Montse Tejera (first season)
- Country of origin: Spain
- Original language: Spanish
- No. of seasons: 6

Production
- Executive producer: Ángel Villoria
- Running time: ~100 min.
- Production company: RTVE

Original release
- Release: 5 March 2005 – present

Para todos la Dos/ Para todos La 2 (word game in Spanish language meaning La 2 for everybody and phonetically Para todos lados means to/for everywhere or to/for every part) is a Spanish talk show by RTVE and broadcast from Sant Cugat's regional studios. The show now broadcast live, every Saturday at 12:00 p.m. Originally, the show was shown live at ~12 p.m. UTC+01:00 and pre-recorded at 7 pm UTC+01:00 (from Monday to Friday).

== Host(s) ==
=== Current ===
Marta Càceres

=== Former ===
- Juanjo Pardo
- Montse Tejera (first season).

== Segments (usual collaborators) ==
- Science: Clemente Álvarez, Concepción Sanz, Daniel Closa
  - Pets: Carolina Pinedo
  - Nutrition: Eulàlia Vidal
- Economy, consume, business, innovation and internet: Alejandro Martínez Berriochoa, Antonella Broglia, Raimon Samsó, Salva Marsal
- Philosophy: Jorge de los Santos, Maite Larrauri, Mónica Esgueva
- History: Dolors Elías, Fransesc de Dalmases
- Humor: Ángel Rielo
- Language: Jorge Enrique Gargallo
- Psychology: Francesc Torralba, Patricia Ramírez, Rafael Santandreu, Teresa Baró, Silvia Congost, Toño Fraguas
- Sexuality: Valérie Tasso
- Television: Raúl Díaz
