= 1997 in Spanish television =

List of years in Spanish television
- … 1987; 1988; 1989; 1990; 1991; 1992; 1993; 1994; 1995; 1996; 1997; 1998; 1999; 2000; 2001; 2002; 2003; 2004; 2005; 2006; 2007 …
- Art; Archaeology; Architecture; Literature; Music; Philosophy; Science; +...

This is a list of Spanish television related events in 1997.

== Events ==
- Unknown: TV channels Canal 4 Navarra and Canal Nostalgia starts broadcasting.
- 31 January: The satellite broadcasting platform Vía Digital is launched.
- 7 February: Fernando López-Amor is appointed Director General de RTVE.
- 13 March: Talk show Tómbola, debuts in regional channels Canal 9, Telemadrid y Canal Sur, and sets a new and polemic way to approach celebs news.
- 24 July: Telefónica becomes major stateholder of Antena 3.
- 15 September:
  - Canal 24 horas News TV Channel is launched.
  - TV channel Locomotion starts broadcasting.
- 1 October: TV channel Viajar starts broadcasting.
- 9 October: TV channel Canal Nou Dos starts broadcasting.
- 2 December: Consuelo Álvarez de Toledo is appointed press ombudsman in Antena 3.
- 31 December: Comic duo Martes y Trece star their last show together, before splitting.

== Debuts ==
Title	Channel	Debut	Performers/Host	Genre
Agrosfera	La 2	1997-10-11	Lourdes Zuriaga	News Magazine
Al salir de clase	Telecinco	1997-09-08	Pilar López de Ayala	Soap Opera
Arévalo y Cía	Antena 3	1997-07-17	Arévalo	Comedy
Así son las cosas	TVE 1	1997-01-08	Manuel Giménez	News Magazine
La banda de Pérez	TVE 1	1997-04-17	Antonio Resines	Sitcom
La botica de la abuela	TVE 1	1997-09-15	Txumari Alfaro	Science/Culture
Calle nueva	TVE 1	1997-09-28	Patricia Adriani	Drama Series
La cara divertida	Antena 3	1997-05-16	Bertín Osborne	Videos
El cine de La 2	La 2	1997-01-27		Movies
Canciones de nuestra vida	Antena 3	1997-05-30	Francis Lorenzo	Music
Cita con Apeles	Telecinco	1997-10-31	Padre Apeles	Talk show
Con T de tarde	Telemadrid	1997-10-06	Terelu Campos	Variety Show
El concursazo	Telecinco	1997-07-01	Bermúdez	Quiz Show
Contigo pan y cebolla	TVE 1	1997-01-13	Ángel de Andrés López	Sitcom
Corazón de...	TVE 1	1997-07-07	Anne Igartiburu	Gossip Show
Crónicas marcianas	Telecinco	1997-09-08	Javier Sardá	Late night
De domingo a domingo	Telecinco	1997-02-09	Belinda Washington	Variety Show
De tal Paco tal astilla	Telecinco	1997-01-14	Paco Rabal	Sitcom
El debate de La Primera	TVE 1	1997-09-16	Luis Herrero	Talk Show
El desván del trasgo	Telecinco	1997-11-08	Olga Fernández	Children
Digan lo que digan	TVE 1	1997-09-29	Jaime Bores	Talk show
El domin...gol	La 2	1997-01-12	Pedro Ruiz	Sport
Don Juan	TVE 1	1997-10-29	José Coronado	Drama Series
Efecto F	Antena 3	1997-02-10	Francis Lorenzo	Late night
En antena	Antena 3	1997-10-20	Inés Ballester	Variety Show
En otras palabras	La 2	1997-05-19	María José Aristizabal	News
En plena forma	Antena 3	1997-09-17	Alfredo Landa	Sitcom
Entre Morancos y Omaitas	TVE 1	1997-04-04	Los Morancos	Comedy
Entre tú y yo	TVE 1	1997-01-08	Laura Valenzuela	Variety Show
El escarabajo verde	La 2	1997-05-24	Pere Ortín	Science/Culture
Espejo secreto	TVE 1	1997-06-25	Norma Duval	Comedy
Extra Rosa	Antena 3	1997-07-14	Ana Rosa Quintana	Gossip Show
El flechazo	TVE 1	1997-09-08	Anabel Alonso	Dating show
Fútbol de plata	Canal+	1997-03-23		Sport
El gallinero	Telecinco	1997-07-26	Tonino	Movies
Gracias por todo	TVE 1	1997-02-01	Ana Obregón	Reality show
Hale Bopp	TVE 1	1997-05-26	José Manuel Parada	Talent show
Hola, hola, hola	Telecinco	1997-07-13	Paz Padilla	Quiz Show
Hoy es posible	TVE 1	1997-01-28	Nieves Herrero	Reality show
Impacto TV	Antena 3	1997-02-17	Carlos García Hirschfeld	Videos
El imperdible	La 2	1997-01-27	Anne Igartiburu	Variety Show
El kanguro de A3Z	Antena 3	1997-10-06	Juanjo Pardo	Tele-Venta
Kety no para	TVE 1	1997-10-10	Soledad Mallol	Sitcom
La 2 en el teatro	La 2	1997-10-24	Juanjo Artero	Cultural
Mamá quiere ser artista	Antena 3	1997-01-10	Concha Velasco	Sitcom
La mandrágora	La 2	1997-01-27	Silvia Ruiz	Cultural
Maridos y mujeres	TVE 1	1997-09-21	Anne Igartiburu	Quiz Show
Más que amigos	Telecinco	1997-07-07	Alberto San Juan	Drama Series
Mayores sin reparos	Antena 3	1997-12-01	Tico Medina	Science/Culture
Mira quién viene esta noche	Antena 3	1997-05-31	Paula Vázquez	Variety Show
Modelo para armar	La 2	1997-01-15	Clara Isabel Francia	Science/Culture
Moros y cristianos	Telecinco	1997-02-15	Javier Sardá	Talk Show
Música sí	La 2	1997-11-29	Alonso Caparrós	Music
Músicas privadas	Canal+	1997-04-17		Sport
Los negocios de mamá	TVE 1	1997-04-07	Rocío Dúrcal	Sitcom
Negro sobre blanco	La 2	1997-01-13	Fernando Sánchez Dragó	Cultural
No veas	TVE 1	1997-07-07	Marlène Mourreau	Videos
La noche abierta	La 2	1997-10-08	Pedro Ruiz	Talk Show
Osados	Antena 3	1997-01-23	Miguel Giménez	Comedy
Paraísos cercanos	La 2	1997-05-22		Documentary
Para entendernos	TVE 1	1997-05-19	Ramón Lluch	Talk Show
Pasen y vean	TVE 1	1997-01-08		Theatre
PC adictos	La 2	1997-04-11	Carlos Sobera	Science/Culture
El programa de Carlos Herrera	TVE 1	1997-09-20	Carlos Herrera	Talk Show
El puente	Telecinco	1997-07-14	Tinet Rubira	Late show
Quatro	La 2	1997-10-06	Paco Vegara	Quiz Show
Querido maestro	Telecinco	1997-04-04	Imanol Arias	Drama Series
Risas y estrellas	TVE 1	1997-09-20	Paloma Lago	Variety Show
Saber vivir	TVE 1	1997-01-08	Manuel Torreiglesias	Science/Culture
Saber y ganar	La 2	1997-02-17	Jordi Hurtado	Quiz Show
Sinceramente Ana Rosa Quintana	Antena 3	1997-02-24	Ana Rosa Quintana	Talk show
Situación de emergencia	Antena 3	1997-09-21	Roberto Arce	Videos
Solo para mujeres	TVE 1	1997-01-20	Alicia Fernández Cobos	Science/Culture
La sonrisa del pelícano	Antena 3	1997-09-15	Pepe Navarro	Late night
Tele risa	Antena 3	1997-07-19	Constantino Romero	Comedy
El tercer grado	La 2	1997-09-18	Isabel San Sebastián	Talk Show
Tocao del ala	La 2	1997-11-15	Ferrán Rañe	Sitcom
Tómbola	Canal Nou	1997-03-13	Ximo Rovira	Gossip Show
Vaya lío	TVE 1	1997-01-13	Concha Galán	Talk show
El valor del dinero	La 2	1997-01-18	Pedro Schwartz	Science/Culture
Ya empezamos	Telecinco	1997-11-29	Alicia Senovilla	Talk Show
Zip zap	TVE 1	1997-03-24	Belén Rueda	Quiz Show
Zoom	Telecinco	1997-09-28	Ángel García	Investigación

== Television shows ==
- La 1
  - Telediario (1957– )
  - Estudio estadio (1972–2005)
  - Informe Semanal (1973– )
  - Parlamento (1978–2014)
  - Barrio Sésamo (1979–2000)
  - Telepasión española (1990– )
  - Vídeos de primera (1990–1998)
  - Quién sabe dónde (1992–1998)
  - ¿Qué apostamos? (1993–2000)
  - Corazón, Corazón (1993–2010)
  - Testigo directo (1994–1999)
  - Cartelera (1994–2009)
  - Los Desayunos de TVE (1994–2020)
  - Cine de barrio (1995– )
  - La Cocina de Arguiñano (1995–1998)
  - El Semáforo (1995–1999)
  - Mitomanía (1995–2001)
  - El Grand Prix del verano (1995–2005)
  - Gente (1995–2011)
  - Hostal Royal Manzanares (1996–1998)
  - Mucha marcha (1996–1999)
- La 2
  - Al filo de lo imposble (1982– )
  - Pueblo de Dios (1982– )
  - Últimas preguntas (1983– )
  - En portada (1984– )
  - Estadio 2 (1984–2007)
  - Metrópolis (1985– )
  - Documentos TV (1986– )
  - Tendido cero (1986– )
  - Días de cine (1991– )
  - Línea 900 (1991–2007)
  - La Aventura del saber (1992– )
  - Jara y sedal (1992– )
  - Pinnic (1992–1998)
  - Zona ACB (1993–2010)
  - Bricomanía (1994–2004)
  - La 2 noticias (1994–2020)
  - La noche temática, (1995– )
  - Mucha Marcha (1995–1999)
  - Un País en la mochila (1995–2000)
  - ¡Qué grande es el cine! (1995–2005)
  - Empléate a fondo (1996–2000)
  - Redes (1996–2013)
- Antena 3
  - Antena 3 Noticias (1990– )
  - Lo que necesitas es amor (1993–1999)
  - Telemaratón (1993–2001)
  - En buenas manos (1994–2005)
  - Lluvia de estrellas (1995–2001)
  - Club Megatrix (1995–2013)
  - Espejo público (1996– )
  - Menudo es mi padre (1996–1998)
  - Sorpresa, ¡Sorpresa! (1996–1999)
  - La casa de los líos (1996–2000)
  - La Parodia nacional (1996–2001)
  - Menudas estrellas (1996–2002)
  - El Primer café (1996–2003)

- Telecinco
  - Informativos Telecinco (1990– )
  - Telecupón (1990–1998)
  - ¡Qué me dices! (1995–1998)
  - Médico de familia (1995–1999)
  - Todos los hombres sois iguales (1996–1998)
  - Ana (1996–1999)
  - El Súper (1996–1999)
  - Día a día (1996–2004)
  - Caiga quien caiga (1996–2008)
- Canal+
  - El día después (1990–2005)
  - Redacción (1990–2005)
  - Del 40 al 1 (1991–1998)
  - Lo + plus (1995–2005)
  - Las noticias del guiñol (1995–2005)
  - Programa más o menos multiplicado o dividido (1996–1999)
  - Magacine (1996–2005)

== Ending this year ==
- La 1
  - Sólo goles (1994–1997)
  - Estamos de vuelta (1995–1997)
  - Contigo pan y cebolla (1996–1997)
- La 2
  - Makinavaja (1995–1997)
  - Rompecocos (1996–1997)
- Antena 3
  - A toda página (1994–1997)
  - Este es mi barrio (1996–1997)
  - La Hora H (1996–1997)
- Telecinco
  - La ruleta de la fortuna (1993–1997)
  - Esta noche cruzamos el Mississippi (1995–1997)
  - Nunca es tarde (1995–1997)

== Foreign series debuts in Spain ==
English title	Spanish title	Original title	Channel	Country	Performers
Aliens in the Family	Mi familia extraterrestre		Canal +	USA	John Bedford Lloyd
Avenger Penguins	Los pingüinos vengadores		FORTA	UK	
Bobby's World	El Mundo de Bobby		Antena 3	USA	
Buffy the Vampire Slayer	Buffy Cazavampiros		Canal +	USA	Sarah Michelle Gellar
Caroline in the City	Los líos de Caroline		Canal +	USA	Lea Thompson
Christy	Christy		Antena 3	USA	Kellie Martin
Equal Justice	Fiscales para la justicia		La 1	USA	George DiCenzo
Esmeralda	Esmeralda	Esmeralda	La 1	MEX	Leticia Calderón
Friends	Colegas		Canal +	USA	J.Aniston, C.Cox, L.Kudrow, M.LeBlanc , M.Perry D.Schwimmer
---	Gardenia		Antena 3	VEN	Caridad Canelón
Goosebumps	Pesadillas		Antena 3	USA	
Happily ever after	...y comieron perdices		Canal +	USA	
Harry and the Hendersons	Harry y los Henderson		FORTA	USA	Bruce Davison
Hercules: The Legendary Journeys	Hércules los viajes legendarios		La 1	USA	Kevin Sorbo
JAG	JAG: Alerta Roja		Antena 3	USA	David James Elliott
L.A. Heat	Los Ángeles Heat		Telecinco	USA	Steven Williams, Wolf Larson
La Femme Nikita	Nikita		Telecinco	FRA	Peta Wilson
Madison	Madison		Canal +	CAN	Enuka Okuma
---	Milagros	Más allá del horizonte	Telecinco	ARG	Grecia Colmenares
Millennium	Millennium		Canal +	USA	Lance Henriksen
Nash Bridges	Nash		La 1	USA	Don Johnson
One West Waikiki	Waikiki		Antena 3	USA	Cheryl Ladd, Richard Burgi
---	Peligrosa	Peligrosa	La 1	VEN	Víctor Cámara
Relativity	Relativity		Canal +	USA	Kimberly Williams-Paisley
Shoot!	Shoot	Aoki Densetsu Shoot!	Telecinco	JAP	
Space Precinct	Brigada especial		FORTA	UK	Simone Bendix
Speed Racer	Meteoro	Mach GoGoGo	FORTA	JAP	
Spin City	Spin City		Telecinco	USA	Michael J. Fox
Sunset Beat	Sunset Beat		Antena 3	USA	George Clooney
Sweet Justice	Dulce justicia		FORTA	USA	Melissa Gilbert
---	Te sigo amando		La 1	MEX	Claudia Ramírez
Temporarily Yours	Todo es temporal		Canal +	USA	Debi Mazar
The Buddha of Suburbia	El buda de los suburbios		Telecinco	UK	Naveen Andrews
The Cosby Mysteries	Los casos de Cosby		FORTA	USA	Bill Cosby
The Golden Palace	Hotel de oro		La 2	USA	B.White R.McClanahan, E.Getty
The Last Frontier	La última frontera		Canal +	USA	Anthony Starke
The Practice	El abogado		Canal +	USA	Dylan McDermott
The Sentinel	Sentinel		Antena 3	USA	Danny Bilson
---	Todo por tu amor	Todo por tu amor	La 1	VEN	Jeannette Rodríguez
Touched by an Angel	Tocados por un Ángel		Antena 3	USA	Danny Bilson
VR.5	VR.5		La 1	USA	Lori Singer
Where on Earth Is Carmen Sandiego?	¿Dónde Está Carmen San Diego?		La 2	USA	
Wonder Woman	La mujer maravilla		Telecinco	USA	Lynda Carter
Xena: Warrior Princess	Xena: la princesa guerrera		La 1	USA	Lucy Lawless

== Deaths ==
- 30 January – Cayetano Luca de Tena, 80, director.
- 22 May – José Antonio Silva, 59, host.
- 5 October – Federico Gallo, 67, Host.
- 19 October – Pilar Miró, 57, director.

== See also ==
- 1991 in Spain
- List of Spanish films of 1991
