= 1991 in Spanish television =

List of years in Spanish television
- … 1981; 1982; 1983; 1984; 1985; 1986; 1987; 1988; 1989; 1990; 1991; 1992; 1993; 1994; 1995; 1996; 1997; 1998; 1999; 2000; 2001 …
- Art; Archaeology; Architecture; Literature; Music; Philosophy; Science; +...

This is a list of Spanish television related events in 1991.

== Events ==
- 4 May: Sergio Dalma represents Spain at the European Song Contest held in Rome (Italy) with the song Bailar pegados, ranking 4th and scoring 119 points
- 19 September: Sitcom Farmacia de guardia debuts in Antena 3. Beginning of the national fiction boom.
- 1 October: After 10 years retired, the famous actress and hostess Carmen Sevilla returns to television to present the program Telecupón in Telecinco.

== Debuts ==
Title	Channel	Debut	Performers/Host / Intérpretes	Genre
A mediodía, alegría	Telecinco	1991-09-30	Leticia Sabater	Children
A pie de página	TVE 1	1991-05-01	Salvador Valdés	Science/Culture
Acervo	TVE 1	1991-09-16		Science/Culture
Al sol con...	Antena 3	1991-07-07	Chábeli Iglesias	Sport
Análisis de la Liga	Canal +	1991-06-17		Sport
Arco de triunfo	TVE 1	1991-02-03	Isabel Gemio	Music
El arte del video	La 2	1991-02-19		Documentary
Aula 3	Antena 3	1991-04-22		Science/Culture
Babilonia	La 2	1991-07-01	Javier Losilla	Music
Cada mañana	TVE 1	1991-05-27	Secundino González	Variety Show
Caliente	TVE 1	1991-07-08	Ana Obregón	Variety Show
Centímetros cúbicos	Antena 3	1991-04-27	Emilio Sanz	Sport
Las chicas de hoy en día	La 2	1991-09-16	Carmen Conesa	Drama Series
Cifras y letras	La 2	1991-01-14	Elisenda Roca	Quiz Show
Cinturón negro	Antena 3	1991-04-25	Coral Bistuer	Movies
Circo, humor y fantasía	Telecinco	1991-12-25	Leticia Sabater	Children
Una ciudad para vivir	TVE 1	1991-07-31		Documentary
Clip, clap, video	La 2	1991-10-14	Tinet Rubira	Music
Crónicas urbanas	La 2	1991-01-08		Reality Show
Culpable o inocente	Antena 3	1991-04-20	Manuel Marlasca	Reality Show
De carne y hueso	TVE 1	1991-06-24	Vicky Larraz	Talk Show
De par en par	TVE 1	1991-05-13	Javier Vázquez	Variety Show
Desafío Canal+	Canal +	1991-04-28		Sport
Desayuna con alegría	Telecinco	1991-09-30	Leticia Sabater	Children
Desde Palma con amor	Telecinco	1991-07-14	Norma Duval	Variety Show
Devórame otra vez	TVE 1	1991-07-04	Guillermo Summers	Videos
Diario de la guerra	La 2	1991-01-21	Matías Prats	News
Días de cine	La 2	1991-10-06	Antonio Gasset	Movies
El 92 cava con todo	TVE 1	1991-12-31	Martes y trece	Comedy
España en solfa	La 2	1991-09-27	Ricardo Solfa	Music
El Espejo	La 2	1992-01-25	Cristina García Ramos	Debate
Estress	La 2	1991-01-23	Bibi Andersen	Variety Show
Extra	La 2	1991-01-12		Science/Culture
Farmacia de guardia	Antena 3	1991-09-19	Concha Cuetos	Sitcom
Frekuencia pirata	La 2	1991-11-03	Tortell Poltrona	Youth
Futbolísimo	Telecinco	1991-07-03	J.J. Santos	Sport
Hablando se entiende la basca	Telecinco	1991-07-01	Jesús Vázquez	Talk Show
Una hija más	TVE 1	1991-02-24	Miguel Rellán	Sitcom
Los hijos del frío	TVE 1	1991-01-07	Ramón Sánchez-Ocaña	Science/Culture
Historias del otro lado	TVE 1	1991-05-08		Drama Series
Humor cinco estrellas	Telecinco	1991-10-19	Mari Carmen	Comedy
Imágenes perdidas	La 2	1991-10-09		Music
Los jinetes del alba	TVE 1	1991-01-09	Jorge Sanz	Drama Series
Línea 900	La 2	1991-10-09		Documentary
Literal	La 2	1991-11-24	Raimon	Science/Culture
Llave en mano	TVE 1	1991-02-21	Marisa Medina	Variety Show
Locos por la tele	TVE-1	1991-01-10	Ferrán Rañé	Quiz Show
Mira 2	La 2	1991-01-13	Concha García Campoy	Talk Show
Narradores	La 2	1991-07-13		Fiction
Las noches de tal y tal	Telecinco	1991-07-13	Jesús Gil y Gil	Variety Show
Olé tus vídeos	FORTA	1991-07-15	Rosa María Sardá	Videos
Orden especial	TVE 1	1991-10-18	Els Joglars	Comedy
El oro y el barro	Antena 3	1991-09-16	Maru Valdivieso	Drama Series
La palmera	TVE 1	1991-07-01	Jordi González	Variety Show
Pasa la vida	TVE 1	1991-10-21	María Teresa Campos	Variety Show
Pictionary	TVE 1	1991-04-29	Jordi Hurtado	Quiz Show
Ponte las pilas	La 2	1991-06-22	Arancha de Benito	Music
Primero izquierda	TVE 1	1991-10-01	Carlos Herrera	Talk Show
Prisma	La 2	1991-06-18	Juan Antonio Gamero	Documentary
El programa de Hermida	Antena 3	1991-09-21	Jesús Hermida	Variety Show
Punto de vista	TVE 1	1991-10-14	Antonio Martín Benítez	Talk Show
Qué gente tan divertida	Telecinco	1991-07-13	Javier Basilio	Videos
Réquiem por Granada	TVE 1	1991-10-09	Manuel Bandera	Drama Series
El rescate del talismán	TVE 1	1991-09-29	Eduardo MacGregor	Game Show
The Return of Dogtanian	TVE 1	1991-09-28		Anime
La Ronda	TVE 1	1991-01-30	Julia Otero	Talk Show
El supertren	TVE 1	1991-04-23	Elisa Matilla	Quiz Show
Taller mecánico	TVE 1	1991-09-18	Antonio Ozores	Sitcom
Tan contentos	Antena 3	1991-04-15	Consuelo Berlanga	Variety Show
La tira de aventuras	TVE 1	1991-04-01		Children
Los Tres de Antena 3	Antena 3	1991-09-07	Luis Herrero	News
Viaje en el tiempo	TVE 1	1991-07-23	María Teresa Álvarez	Documentary
Viva la vida	Antena 3	1991-04-15	Bartolomé Beltrán	Science/Culture
Vivan los novios	Telecinco	1991-07-14	Andoni Ferreño	Dating show
Visto y no visto	TVE 1	1991-10-05	Arcadio Pascual	Children

== Television shows ==
- La 1
  - Telediario (1957– )
  - Un, dos, tres... responda otra vez (1972–2004)
  - Estudio estadio (1972–2005)
  - Informe Semanal (1973– )
  - Parlamento (1978–2014)
  - Hablando claro (1987–1992)
  - Juegos sin fronteras (1988–1992)
  - Rockopop (1988–1992)
  - El Precio justo (1988–2001)
  - Brigada Central (1989–1993)
  - Telepasión española (1990– )
  - Un Día es un día (1990–1993)
  - La Mujer de tu vida (1990–1994)
  - No te rías, que es peor (1990–1995)
  - Club Disney (1990–1996)
  - Vídeos de primera (1990–1998)
- La 2
  - Al filo de lo imposble (1982– )
  - Pueblo de Dios (1982– )
  - Últimas preguntas (1983– )
  - En portada (1984– )
  - Estadio 2 (1984–2007)
  - Metrópolis (1985– )
  - Documentos TV (1986– )
  - Tendido cero (1986– )
  - El Tiempo es oro (1987–1992)
  - La Tabla redonda (1990–1993)
- Antena 3
  - Antena 3 Noticias (1990– )
  - El Gordo (1990–1992)
  - Noche de lobos (1990–1992)
  - La ruleta de la fortuna (1990–1992)
  - De tú a tú (1990–1993)
  - La Guardería (1990–1993)
  - La Merienda (1990–1994)
- Telecinco
  - Informativos Telecinco (1990– )
  - Tele 5 ¿dígame? (1990–1992)
  - Tutti frutti (1990–1992)
  - VIP Noche (1990–1992)
  - Bellezas al agua (1990–1993)
  - Entre platos anda el juego (1990–1993)
  - Hablando se entiende la gente (1990–1993)
  - La Quinta marcha (1990–1993)
  - Humor amarillo (1990–1995)
  - Su media naranja (1990–1996)
  - Telecupón (1990–1998)
- Canal+
  - El día después (1990–2005)
  - Redacción (1990–2005)
  - Del 40 al 1 (1991–1998)

== Ending this year ==
- La 1
  - De película (1982–1991)
  - Con las manos en la masa (1984–1991)
  - Los Marginados (1984–1991)
  - Punto y aparte (1985–1991)
  - Cajón desastre (1988–1991)
  - Juego de niños (1988–1991)
  - Aventura 92 (1989–1991)
  - Pero... ¿esto qué es? (1989–1991)
  - Sopa de gansos (1989–1991)
  - Tribunal popular (1989–1991)
  - Waku waku (1989–1991)
  - Plàstic (1989–1991)
  - Detrás de la noticia (1990–1991)
  - En buena hora (1990–1991)
  - En jaque (1990–1991)
  - Esta es su casa (1990–1991)
  - Locos por la tele (1990–1991)
  - El Salero (1990–1991)
  - Viva el espectáculo (1990–1991)
- La 2
  - Jazz entre amigos (1984–1991)
  - Espiral: Detrás de la noticia (1990–1991)
- Antena 3
  - La Clave (1990–1991)
  - El Orgullo de la huerta (1990–1991)
  - Polvo de estrellas (1990–1991)
  - Ricos y famosos (1990–1991)
  - Los segundos cuentan (1990–1991)
  - Y ahora Encarna (1990–1991)
- Telecinco
  - ¡Ay, que calor! (1990–1991)
  - VIP tarde (1990–1991)

== Foreign series debuts in Spain ==
English title	Spanish title	Original title	Channel	Country	Performers
21 Jump Street	Nuevos policías		Antena 3	USA	Johnny Depp
A Man Called Hawk	Un hombre llamado halcón		Antena 3	USA	Avery Brooks
A Very British Coup	Un golpe muy británico		La 1	UK	Ray McAnally
A Year in the Life	Un año en la vida		La 2	USA	Richard Kiley
Alfred J. Kwak	Alfred J. Kwak	Alfred J. Kwak	La 1	NED JAP	
---	Andrea celeste	Andres Celeste	FORTA	ARG	Andrea del Boca
Anne of Green Gables	Ana de las Tejas Verdes	Akage no An, Red-haired Anne	Telecinco	JAP	
Anything but Love	Cariño de papel		Telecinco	USA	Richard Lewis, Jamie Lee Curtis
Attacker You!	Dos fuera de serie	Atakkā Yū	Telecinco	JAP	
B.L. Stryker	B.L. Striker		La 1	USA	Burt Reynolds
Belly Rent	Vientre de alquiler	Barriga de Aluguel	Telecinco	BRA	Cláudia Abreu
Baywatch	Los vigilantes de la playa		La 1	USA	David Hasselhoff
Beetlejuice	Beetlejuice		Canal +	USA	
Belle and Sebastian	Orsi	Meiken Jorī	Telecinco	JAP	
Beverly Hills Teens	Los chicos de Beverly Hills		Canal +	USA	
Beverly Hills, 90210	Sensación de vivir		Telecinco	USA	Jason Priestley, Shannen Doherty
Chillers	Escalofríos... con Patricia Highsmith		La 2	FRA	Anthony Perkins
Coach	Entrenador		Canal +	USA	Craig T. Nelson
Cop Rock	Cop Rock		Antena 3	USA	Anne Bobby
Dash Kappei	Chicho Terremoto		Antena 3	JAP	
Designing Women	Chicas con clase		Antena 3	USA	Dixie Carter
Dink, the Little Dinosaur	Dink, el pequeño dinosaurio		La 1	USA	
Don't Rock the Boat	Lío gordo a bordo		Telecinco	UK	Shaun Wallace
Dragnet	Las redes de la justicia		La 1	USA	Jeff Osterhage
Dream On	Sigue soñando		Canal +	USA	Brian Benben
Empty Nest	Nido vacío		La 1	USA	Richard Mulligan
Evening Shade	La familia Newton		Antena 3	USA	Burt Reynolds
Family Matters	Cosas de casa		Antena 3	USA	Reginald VelJohnson, Jaleel White
Foley Square	La oficina del fiscal		Canal +	USA	Margaret Colin
From a Bird's Eye View	Dos chicas de altura		Antena 3	UK	Millicent Martin
Full House	Padres forzosos		Canal +	USA	Bob Saget, John Stamos
Gabriel's Fire	La pasión de Gabriel		La 1	USA	James Earl Jones
Gophers!	Los Gofers		Canal +	UK	Lou Hirsch
Hale and Pace	Hale y Pace		Canal +	UK	Gareth Hale, Norman Pace
Hallo Spencer	Hola Spencer	Hallo Spencer	Canal +	GER	
Hammer House of Horror	La casa del terror		Antena 3	UK	
Head of the Class	Los primeros de la clase		Canal +	USA	Howard Hesseman
Hey Vern, It's Ernest!	Hey Bern		Canal +	USA	Jim Varney
Hunter	Hunter		Telecinco	USA	Fred Dryer
I buy that woman	Yo compro esa mujer	Yo compro esa mujer	La 1	MEX	Leticia Calderón
---	Inés Duarte, secretaria	Inés Duarte, secretaria	Telecinco	VEN	Víctor Cámara
Jayce and the Wheeled Warriors	Jayce y los Guerreros Rodantes	Jayce et les Conquérants de la Lumière	Canal +	FRA	
Just the Ten of Us	Somos Diez		Antena 3	USA	Bill Kirchenbauer
---	La extraña dama	La extraña dama	La 1	ARG	Luisa Kuliok
Leonela	Leonela		Antena 3	VEN	Mayra Alejandra
Let the Blood Run Free	Deja la sangre correr		Canal +	AUS	Jean Kittson
Little Rosey	La pequeña Rosie		Canal +	USA	Roseanne Barr
Lonesome Dove	La paloma solitaria		FORTA	USA	Robert Duvall, Tommy Lee Jones
Lupin the Third	Lupin III	Rupan sansei	Telecinco	JAP	
Mancuso, F.B.I.	Mancuso		Antena 3	USA	Robert Loggia
---	Manuela	Manuela	Telecinco	ARG	Grecia Colmenares
María María	María, maría		Telecinco	VEN	Alba Roversi
Married... with Children	Matrimonio con hijos		La 2	USA	Ed O'Neill, Katey Sagal
Matlock	Matlock		La 1	USA	Andy Griffith
---	Matrimonios y algo más	Matrimonios y algo más	FORTA	ARG	Fernando Siro
Midnight Caller	Llamadas a medianoche		La 2	USA	Gary Cole
Mister Ed	Mister Ed		FORTA	USA	Alan Young
Naked Video	Naked Video		FORTA	UK	Ron Bain
Paris	Paris		FORTA	USA	James Earl Jones
Pigsburg Pigs	Pigsburg Pigs		Canal +	USA	
Popeye and Son	Popeye y su hijo		Canal +	USA	
Professor Poopsnagle's Steam Zeppelin	El Profesor Poopsnagle		La 2	AUS	Gerry Duggan
Quantum Leap	A través del tiempo		FORTA	USA	Scott Bakula, Dean Stockwell
Rascal the Raccoon	Rascal, el mapache	Araiguma Rasukaru	Telecinco	JAP	
---	Rubí	Rubí rebelde	La 1	VEN	Mariela Alcalá
Samurai Pizza Cats	Gatos samurai	Kyatto Ninden Teyandee	Canal +	JAP	
Saved by the Bell	Salvados por la campana		Antena 3	USA	Mark-Paul Gosselaar
Sea Hunt	Caza submarina		Antena 3	USA	Ron Ely
---	Señora		Telecinco	MEX	Julieta Egurrola
Serpico	Serpico		Telecinco	USA	David Birney
Shadow of the Noose	La sombra de la orca		La 2	UK	Jonathan Hyde
Sharky & George	Sharky y George	Sharky et Georges	Canal +	CAN	
She's the Sheriff	La mujer del sheriff		Antena 3	USA	Suzanne Somers
Spatz	Spatz		Canal +	UK	Vas Blackwood
Star Street	Star Street	Star Street	La 1	NED	
Stradivarius	Stradivarius	Stradivarius	Telecinco	ITA	Anthony Quinn
T. and T.	TyT		La 2	USA	Mr. T
Tales from the Darkside	Cuentos desde la oscuridad		Canal +	USA	Paul Sparer
Taotao	Tao Tao	Tao Tao Ehonkan	Telecinco	JAP	
Tattingers	Tattingers		FORTA	USA	Stephen Collins
The Adventures of Teddy Ruxpin	Las aventuras de Teddy Ruxbin		Telecinco	USA	
The Australians	Los australianos		La 2	AUS	Peter Luck
The Betty White Show	El show de Betty White		Canal +	USA	Betty White
The Bold and the Beautiful	Belleza y poder		FORTA	USA	Katherine Kelly Lang
The Fresh Prince of Bel-Air	El príncipe de Bel-Air		Antena 3	USA	Will Smith
The Ginger Tree	El árbol del jengibre		La 2	UK	Samantha Bond
The Hitchhiker	El autoestopista		La 1	USA CAN	Page Fletcher
The Munsters Today	La familia Monsters hoy		La 2	USA	John Schuck
The New Adventures of Gilligan	Las nuevas aventuras de Gilligan		FORTA	USA	
The New Statesman	Un diputado fantástico		Antena 3	USA	Rik Mayall
The Piglet Files	Pichón, agente secreto		Canal +	UK	Nicholas Lyndhurst
The Simpsons	Los Simpson		La 2	USA	
The StoryTeller	El Cuentacuentos		La 1	UK	John Hurt
The Trials of Life	La vida a prueba		La 2	UK	David Attenborough
The Wonderful Wizard of Oz	El Mago de Oz]	Ozu no Mahōtsukai	FORTA	JAP	
Three's Company	Apartamento para tres		Telecinco	USA	John Ritter, Joyce DeWitt, Suzanne Somers
Tiger Mask	El hombre tigre	Taigā Masuku	Canal +	JAP	
Topacio	Topacio		Telecinco	VEN	Grecia Colmenares
Touch	Bateadores	Tatchi	Telecinco	JAP	
Victor & Hugo	Victor y Hugo		Canal +	UK	
WIOU	Traficantes de noticias		FORTA	USA	John Shea
Working It Out	Empezar de nuevo		Antena 3	USA	Jane Curtin

== Births ==
- 21 January – Javier Calvo, actor, director y productor.
- 24 March, Eduardo Casanova, actor
- 3 March, Víctor Elías, actor
- 19 July – Andrea del Río, actress.
- 3 November – Adriana Torrebejano, actress
- 12 December, Jaime Lorente, actor

== Deaths ==
- 21 February – Andrés Mejuto, actor, 82
- 14 May – José María Rodero, actor, 68
- 14 May – Victoriano Fernández de Asís, journalist, 85
- 22 June – Manolo Alcalá, reportero, 57
- 4 August – Cassen, actor y humorista, 62
- 15 October – Franz Johan, cómico y host, 84
- José Enrique Camacho, actor, 63.

== See also ==
- 1991 in Spain
- List of Spanish films of 1991
