= 1995 in Spanish television =

This is a list of Spanish television related events in 1995.

== Events ==
- 18 March: The wedding ceremony of Elena de Borbón and Jaime de Marichalar is broadcast by La 1, directed by Pilar Miró. It gets the day-time highest audience for a TV channel since 1990: 8.623.000 viewers (71.4% share).
- 12 April: For the first time a Private Channel News Program Antena 3 Noticias, hosted by Olga Viza overtakes in viewers the State owned La 1 News Program Telediario
- 13 May: Anabel Conde represents Spain at the Eurovision Song Contest 1995 held in Dublin (Ireland) with the song Vuelve conmigo, ranking 2nd and scoring 119 points.
- 19 October: The documentary program Documentos TV broadcasts the investigation story Las habitaciones de la muerte (Death Rooms), about the terrible condition of thousand of girls in orphanages in China; Spanish society gets shocked and the program unleashes a surge of international adoptions in the country.
- 11 November: Marcos Llunas, representing TVE, wins the Festival OTI de la Canción.
- 28 December: On air last episode of Antena 3 favorite sitcom Farmacia de Guardia, with 11.527.000 viewers 62.8% share.

== Debuts ==
Title	Channel	Debut	Performers/Host	Genre
A las diez en casa	TVE 1	1995-08-03	Elisenda Roca	Talk Show
A quién se le ocurre	Antena 3	1995-05-12	Pepe Carrol	Quiz Show
Abierto en canal	Canal+	1995-10-01		Documentary
América total	La 2	1995-12-03	Miguel de los Santos	Documentary
Apaga y vámonos	La 2	1995-12-15	Bermúdez	Comedy
Aquí jugamos todos	TVE 1	1995-06-12	Miriam Díaz-Aroca y Ramón García	Quiz Show
Aquí no hay quien duerma	Telecinco	1995-10-06	Pepe Carrol	Talk Show
Ay Lola, Lolita, Lola	TVE 1	1995-02-09	Lola Flores, Lolita	Variety Show
Casa para dos	Telecinco	1995-01-04	Juanjo Menéndez	Sitcom
Cine de barrio	La 2	1995-07-10	José Manuel Parada	Movies
Club Megatrix	Antena 3	1995-05-17	Ingrid Asensio	Children
La cocina de Karlos Arguiñano	TVE 1	1995-09-17	Karlos Argiñano	Cooking Show
Con luz propia	Antena 3	1995-06-07	Candela Palazón	News
Cuando calienta el Sol	TVE 1	1995-07-17	Ramón García	Game Show
Curro Jiménez, el regreso de una leyenda	Antena 3	1995-04-11	Sancho Gracia	Drama Series
El debate de hoy	TVE 1	1995-10-26	Pedro Altares	Talk Show
El destino en sus manos	TVE 1	1995-04-26	Gemma Nierga	Talk Show
¿Dónde se esconde Carmen Sandiego?	TVE 1	1995-01-13	Luis Montalvo	Quiz Show
En casa con Raffaella	Telecinco	1995-03-20	Raffaella Carrá	Variety Show
En directo contigo	Telecinco	1995-09-18	Belén Rueda	Variety Show
Enrróllate	Telecinco	1995-11-27	Javier Capitán	Science/Culture
Esta noche cruzamos el Mississippi	Telecinco	1995-09-18	Pepe Navarro	Late Night
Esta noche, sexo	Antena 3	1995-01-17	Isabel Gemio	Science/Culture
Estamos de vuelta	TVE 1	1995-10-10	Cruz y Raya	Comedy
Esto es lo que hay	TVE 1	1995-11-03	Ángel Casas	Late Night
Fuerzas ocultas	TVE 1	1995-09-25	Juan José Plans	Variety Show
Gente en cartelera	TVE 1	1995-10-16	Jose Toledo	News
Historias de la vida	Telecinco	1995-06-20	Ana Rosa Quintana	News
Hora límite	Telecinco	1995-10-05	Luis Mariñas	News
Hoy en el Parlamento	La 2	1995-10-02		News
Juntas, pero no revueltas	TVE 1	1995-10-01	Mercedes Sampietro	Sitcom
Las lecciones de cocina de Pedro Subijana	Telecinco	1995-10-23	Pedro Subijana	Cooking Show
Llévatelo calentito	TVE 1	1995-05-12	Los Morancos	Comedy
Lo + Plus	Canal+	1995-04-04	Fernando Schwartz	Talk Show
Lo que en tiempos se llevó	La 2	1995-01-11	Guillermo Summers	Videos
Lo que hay que tener	TVE 1	1995-09-24	Leticia Sabater	Youth
Lluvia de estrellas	Antena 3	1995-06-05	Bertín Osborne	Talent show
Makinavaja	La 2	1995-01-17	Pepe Rubianes	Sitcom
Más que palabras	Antena 3	1995-01-16	Mercedes Milá	Talk Show
Médico de familia	Telecinco	1995-09-15	Emilio Aragón	Dramedy
Menudo Show	Antena 3	1995-09-30	Diana Lázaro	Talent show
Mitomanía	TVE 1	1995-08-29	Guillermo Summers	Videos
Mójate	TVE 1	1995-07-19	Esther Arroyo	Variety Show
Mortadelo y Filemón	Antena 3	1995-01-14	Antena 3	Anime
Nadie es perfecto	TVE 1	1995-02-01	Antxón Urrusolo	News
NBA en acción	Canal+	1995-06-05		Sport
No te olvides el cepillo de dientes	Antena 3	1995-01-16	Paula Vázquez	Game Show
La noche de los castillos	TVE 1	1995-09-22	Luis Fernando Alvés	Game Show
La noche temática	La 2	1995-10-03		Documentary
Norte-Sur	La 2	1995-01-11		Documentary
Las noticias del guiñol	Canal+	1995-09-15		Comedy
Noticias y negocios	Telecinco	1995-10-31	Carlos Humanes	News
Número uno	Telecinco	1995-09-28	Pepe Domingo Castaño	Quiz Show
Nunca es tarde	Telecinco	1995-12-03	Ana Rosa Quintana	Talk show
Pepa y Pepe	TVE 1	1995-01-10	Verónica Forqué	Sitcom
Plusvalía	Canal+	1995-03-05	Belén Ayala	Science/Culture
Por hablar que no quede	Telecinco	1995-03-02	Julián Lago	Debate
Por fin solos	Antena 3	1995-04-18	Alfredo Landa	Sitcom
¡Qué grande es el cine!	La 2	1995-02-13	José Luis Garci	Movies
¡Qué me dices!	Antena 3	1995-07-27	Belinda Washington	Gossip Magazine
Querida familia	Antena 3	1995-10-03	Cristina Caras Lindas	Reality Show
Quién da la vez	Antena 3	1995-01-17	José Sacristán	Sitcom
El rastrillo	Antena 3	1995-12-01	Paula Vázquez	Variety Show
Refrescante 95	Antena 3	1995-07-19	Irma Soriano	Videos
La Regenta	TVE 1	1995-01-17	Aitana Sánchez-Gijón	Drama Series
La Revista	TVE 1	1995-09-21	José Luis Moreno	Music
La ruta de los exploradores	La 2	1995-10-06	Gerardo Olivares	Documentary
Se busca	Antena 3	1995-09-15	José Antonio Gavira	News Magazine
El semáforo	TVE 1	1995-10-27	Jordi Estadella	Game Show
Sin ir más lejos	Telecinco	1995-03-23	Belén Rueda	Documentary
Sonrisas 95	Antena 3	1995-06-12	Rody Aragón	Comedy
El Sur	La 2	1995-09-02		Documentary
Tinto de verano	Telecinco	1995-07-12		Videos
Todos a bordo	Antena 3	1995-07-12	Juan Luis Galiardo	Sitcom
La Transición	La 2	1995-07-23	Victoria Prego	Documentary
Tren de cercanías	La 2	1995-04-06	Adolfo Marsillach	Talk Show
Tres hijos para mí solo	Antena 3	1995-10-03	Enrique Simón	Sitcom
Un millón de gracias	Antena 3	1995-07-18	Las Virtudes	Comedy
Un país en la mochila	La 2	1995-10-14	José Antonio Labordeta	Documentary
Un paseo por el tiempo	TVE 1	1995-04-26	Julia Otero	Talk Show
Uno para todas	Telecinco	1995-04-19	Goyo González	Game Show
Ven con nosotros	Telecinco	1995-11-27	Rebeca Marcos	News
Verde que te quier verde	La 2	1995-10-01	Javier de Artetxe	Science/Culture
La vida según...	TVE 1	1995-09-24	Ana Cristina Navarro	Talk Show
Zona franca	La 2	1995-06-02	Arancha de Benito	Music

== Television shows ==
- La 1
  - Telediario (1957– )
  - Estudio estadio (1972–2005)
  - Informe Semanal (1973– )
  - Parlamento (1978–2014)
  - Telepasión española (1990– )
  - Club Disney (1990–1996)
  - Vídeos de primera (1990–1998)
  - Pasa la vida (1991–1996)
  - Quién sabe dónde (1992–1998)
  - ¿Qué apostamos? (1993–2000)
  - Corazón, Corazón (1993–2010)
  - Esto es espectáculo (1994–1996)
  - Sólo goles (1994–1997)
  - Testigo directo (1994–1999)
  - Cartelera (1994–2009)
  - Los Desayunos de TVE (1994–2020)
- La 2
  - Al filo de lo imposble (1982– )
  - Pueblo de Dios (1982– )
  - Últimas preguntas (1983– )
  - En portada (1984– )
  - Estadio 2 (1984–2007)
  - Metrópolis (1985– )
  - Documentos TV (1986– )
  - Tendido cero (1986– )
  - Días de cine (1991– )
  - Cifras y Letras (1991–1996)
  - Línea 900 (1991–2007)
  - La Aventura del saber (1992– )
  - Jara y sedal (1992 -)
  - Tal cual (1992–1996)
  - Pinnic (1992–1998)
  - Lingo (1993–1996)
  - Zona ACB (1993–2010)
  - Función de noche (1994–1996)
  - El Lector (1994–1996)
  - Bricomanía (1994–2000)
  - La 2 noticias (1994–2020)
- Antena 3
  - Antena 3 Noticias (1990– )
  - Cita con la vida (1993–1996)
  - Hermida y Cía (1993–1996)
  - Los ladrones van a la oficina (1993–1996)
  - Lo que necesitas es amor (1993–1999)
  - Telemaratón (1993–2001)
  - Hermanos de leche (1994–1996)
  - A toda página (1994–1997)
  - En buenas manos (1994–2005)
- Telecinco
  - Informativos Telecinco (1990– )
  - Su media naranja (1990–1996)
  - Telecupón (1990–1998)
  - La ruleta de la fortuna (1993–1997)
  - Karaoke (1994–1996)
- Canal+
  - El día después (1990–2005)
  - Redacción (1990–2005)
  - Del 40 al 1 (1991–1998)

== Ending this year ==
- La 1
  - No te rías, que es peor (1990–1995)
  - El Menú de Karlos Arguiñano (1993–1995)
  - Valor y coraje (1993–1995)
  - ¿De qué parte estás? (1994–1995)
  - Unos y los otros, Los (1994–1995)
- La 2
  - Clip, clap, video (1991–1995)
  - Bit a Bit (1993–1995)
  - Zona de juegos (1993–1995)
  - Centros de poder (1994–1995)
  - Esto no es lo que parece (1994–1995)
- Antena 3
  - Farmacia de guardia (1991–1995)
  - El gran juego de la oca (1993–1995)
  - ¡Ay, Señor, Señor! (1994–1995)
  - Canguros (1994–1995)
  - Confesiones (1994–1995)
  - Genio y figura (1994–1995)
  - Ta tocao (1994–1995)
- Telecinco
  - Humor amarillo (1990–1995)
  - Este país necesita un repaso (1993–1995)
  - ¿De qué parte estás? (1994–1995)
  - Pareja feliz, Una (1994–1995)
  - Trampolín, El (1994–1995)
  - Veredicto (1994–1995)

== Foreign series debuts in Spain ==
English title	Spanish title	Original title	Channel	Country	Performers
704 Hauser	704 Hauser Street		FORTA	USA	John Amos
A League of Their Own	Ellas dan el golpe		FORTA	USA	Sam McMurray
Aaahh!!! Real Monsters	Mi profe es un monstruo		Canal +	USA	
–	Agujetas de color de rosa	Agujetas de color de rosa	La 1	MEX	Angélica María
All-New Dennis the Menace	Daniel el Travieso		Telecinco	USA	
American Chronicles	Crónicas Americanas		La 2	USA	
Animal Show	El Show animal		Canal +	UK	
Batman: The Animated Series	Batman		Antena 3	USA	
Boy Meets World	Yo y el Mundo		La 1	USA	Ben Savage
Brand New Life	Una nueva vida		La 1	USA	Barbara Eden
---	Café con aroma de mujer	Café con aroma de mujer	La 1	COL	Margarita Rosa de Francisco
C.L.Y.D.E.	Clyde		FORTA	FRA	
Carol and Company	Carol y compañía		La 2	USA	Carol Burnett
Chicago Hope	Chicago Hope		Antena 3	USA	M.Patinkin, M.Harmon, H.Elizondo
Clarissa Explains It All	Clarisa lo explica todo		La 1	USA	Melissa Joan Hart
Creamy Mami, the Magic Angel	El broche encantado	Mahō no Tenshi Kurīmī Mami	Telecinco	JAP	
Dangerous Women	Mujeres peligrosas		Telecinco	USA	Valerie Wildman
Deepwater Haven	Los chicos de la bahía		La 1	AUS NZL	Vince Martin
---	Dulce Ilusión	Dulce Ilusión	La 1	VEN	Coraima Torres
Ellen	Ellen		La 2	USA	Ellen DeGeneres
ER	Urgencias		La 1	USA	Anthony Edwards, George Clooney
Fatal Vision	Visión fatal		Antena 3	USA	Gary Cole, Karl Malden
FBI: The Untold Stories	Los casos secretos del FBI		La 2	USA	
Flying Blind	Volando a ciegas		Telecinco	USA	Téa Leoni, Corey Parker
Forever Knight	El señor de las tinieblas		Telecinco	CAN	Geraint Wyn Davies
Frasier	Frasier		Antena 3	USA	Kelsey Grammer
G.B.H.	Tráfico de Influencias		Canal +	UK	Robert Lindsay, Michael Palin
Garfield and Friends	Garfield y sus amigos		Canal +	USA	
Getting By	Vamos tirando		La 1	USA	Cindy Williams
Globe Trekker	Planeta solitario		La 2	UK	
Harts of the West	Los Hart en el Oeste		Antena 3	USA	Beau Bridges
Heartbreak High	Los rompecorazones		La 1	AUS	Alex Dimitriades
He-Man and the Masters of the Universe	He Man		Telecinco	USA	
Herman's Head	La cabeza de Herman		La 2	USA	William Ragsdale
High Tide	Marea alta		Antena 3	USA	Rick Springfield
Hoyt'n Andy's Sportsbender	Las superdeportistas		Canal +	USA	
Insektors	Insektors	Insektors	Canal +	FRA	
Inspector Morse	Inspector jefe Morse		Telecinco	USA	John Thaw
Living Single	Solteras		La 2	USA	Queen Latifah
Lois & Clark	Lois y Clark		La 1	USA	Dean Cain, Teri Hatcher
Magical Emi, the Magic Star	La magia de Emi	Mahō no Sutā Majikaru Emi	Telecinco	USA	
Models	Modelos		La 1	USA	Linda Gray
My Pet Monster	Mi Monstruito		Telecinco	USA	
Northwood	Northwood		La 2	CAN	Lochlyn Munro
Party of Five	Cinco en familia		FORTA	USA	Scott Wolf
Phantom 2040	Phantom 2040		Canal +	USA	
ReBoot	ReBoot		Canal +	CAN	
RoboCop	RoboCop: la serie		Telecinco	CAN	Richard Eden
Rocko's Modern Life	La vida moderna de Rocko		Canal +	USA	
Sauerkraut	Sauerkraut		Canal +	GER	[[]]
Scarlett	Scarlett		Antena 3	USA	Timothy Dalton
seaQuest DSV	Los vigilantes del fondo del mar		La 1	USA	Roy Scheider
---	Selva María	Selva María	La 1	VEN	Mariela Alcalá
Sister, Sister	Cosas de hermanas		Antena 3	USA	Tia & Tamera Mowry
Sisters	Hermanas		La 2	USA	Swoosie Kurtz
Small Wonder	Un robot en casa		Antena 3	USA	Tiffany Brissette
Spider-Man	Spider-Man		Antena 3	USA	
Spirou	Spirou y Fantasio		Antena 3	FRA	
Step by Step	Paso a paso		La 1	USA	Patrick Duffy, Suzanne Somers
Super Force	Super Force		Antena 3	USA	Ken Olandt
Superboy	Superboy		Telecinco	USA	John Newton
Swamp Thing	La criatura del pantano		La 2	USA	Mark Lindsay Chapman
Sweet Valley High	Las gemelas de Sweet Valley		La 1	USA	Brittany Daniel, Cynthia Daniel
Tequila and Bonetti	Tequila y Bonetti		La 1	USA	Jack Scalia
The Awakening Land	El despertar de una tierra		La 1	USA	Elizabeth Montgomery
The Borrowers	Los incursores		La 1	UK	Ian Holm
The Chronicles of Narnia	Crónicas de Narnia		La 2	UK	Richard Dempsey
The Commish	El comisionado		FORTA	USA	Michael Chiklis
The Critic	El Crítico		Canal +	USA	
The Itsy Bitsy Spider	Itsy Bitsy		Canal +	GBR	
The John Larroquette Show	De mal en peor		La 2	USA	John Larroquette
The Long Hot Summer	El largo y cálido verano		Antena 3	USA	Don Johnson
The Mask: Animated Series	La Máscara: la serie animada		Canal +	USA	
The Powers of Matthew Star	Los poderes de Matthew Star		Telecinco	USA	Peter Barton
The Return of the Psammead	El retorno de los Psammead		La 1	UK	Toby Ufindell-Phillips
The Super Mario Bros. Super Show!	The Super Mario Bros. Super Show!		Telecinco	USA	
The Tick	La Garrapata		Canal +	USA	
The White Whale of Mu	Ballena blanca	Mū no Hakugei	Telecinco	JAP	
The X-Files	Expediente X		Telecinco	USA	David Duchovny, Gillian Anderson
Thea	Thea		FORTA	USA	Thea Vidale
Thunder in Paradise	Operación trueno		Telecinco	USA	Hulk Hogan
Time of Your Life	Los mejores años		Antena 3	CAN	Jason Cavalier
VR Troopers	VR Troopers		Telecinco	USA	Brad Hawkins
Walker, Texas Ranger	Walker, Texas Ranger		Telecinco	USA	Chuck Norris
Weird Science	Una chica explosiva		La 1	USA	John Asher
Wildfire	Fuego Salvaje		Telecinco	USA	
WKRP in Cincinnati	WKRP in Cincinnati		Canal +	USA	Gary Sandy
X-Men	Patrulla X		Telecinco	USA	

== Births ==
- 4 January: María Isabel, singer, winner of Junior Eurovision Song Contest 2004 representing TVE.
- 23 September – Patrick Criado, actor.
- 27 December – Carlos Cuevas, actor

== Deaths ==
- 10 January – Gabriel Aragón, clown, 72
- 26 April – Luis Miravitlles, host, 65
- 3 May – Joaquín Prat, host, 66
- 16 May – Lola Flores, singer, actress y hostess, 72
- 4 July – Irene Gutiérrez Caba, actress, 66
- 10 October – Juan Manuel Soriano, host, 75
- 23 October – Kiko Ledgard, host, 76
- 22 November – Esperanza Grases, actress, 75

== See also ==
- 1995 in Spain
- List of Spanish films of 1995
