= 1996 in Spanish television =

This is a list of Spanish television related events in 1996.

== Events ==
- Unknown: TV channel Odisea starts broadcasting.
- 16 April: Corporate groups Correo and Prensa Española, later merged as Vocento purchase 25% share of Channel Telecinco, up to that time owned by ONCE.
- 10 May: Mónica Ridruejo is appointed Director General of RTVE.
- 15 May: Alejandro Echevarría is appointed Chief executive officer of Telecinco.
- 14 December: Spain wins the Festival de la OTI with the song En mis manos, by Anabel Russ.

== Debuts ==
Title	Channel	Debut	Performers/Host	Genre
A su salud	La 2	1996-10-15	Claudio Mariscal	Science/Culture
Al compás de la copla	Antena 3	1996-01-13	María del Monte	Music
Ana	Telecinco	1996-07-08	Ana García Lozano	Talk show
¡Ay que risa, María Luisa!	Telecinco	1996-01-01		Comedy
Click, clack. La fotografía	La 2	1996-10-13	Luis Félix Saralegui	Science/Culture
Caiga quien caiga	Telecinco	1996-05-10	El Gran Wyoming	Comedy
Carmen y familia	TVE 1	1996-04-15	Beatriz Carvajal	Sitcom
La casa de los líos	Antena 3	1996-09-15	Arturo Fernández	Sitcom
El club de los listillos	Telecinco	1996-01-23	Patxi Alonso	Quiz Show
Con mucha marcha	La 2	1996-09-23	Leticia Sabater	Children
Coplas de verano	Antena 3	1996-08-03	Bibí Andersen	Music
Compact Dyc	Telecinco	1996-10-06	Lorenzo Santamaría	Music
Cuadernos de rodaje	Canal+	1996-01-12		Movies
Cuerda de presos	Antena 3	1996-01-25	Jesús Quintero	Talk Show
De los buenos, el mejor	Antena 3	1996-02-05	Arévalo	Comedy
El Detective Bogey	La 2	1996-02-17		Children
Día a día	Telecinco	1996-09-16	María Teresa Campos	Variety Show
Dobles parejas	Antena 3	1996-04-15	Santiago Segura	Dating show
Dossier	TVE-1	1996-11-11		News Magazine
Eldíaquemeentiendas	La 2	1996-02-08	Lulú Martorell	Talk Show
Empléate a fondo	La 2	1996-09-17	Mayte Cabezas	Public Service
Érase una vez la tele	TVE-1	1996-11-23	Guillermo Summers	Videos
La España salvaje	TVE-1	1996-11-05	Felipe de Borbón	Science/Culture
Espejo público	Antena 3	1996-10-20	Pedro Piqueras	News
Éste es mi barrio	Antena 3	1996-09-13	José Sacristán	Drama Series
Fetiche	TVE-1	1996-05-20	Lola Baldrich	Sitcom
Historias de la tele	La 2	1996-10-07		Variety Show
Hola, Ola	TVE-1	1996-07-20	Miguel Ortiz	Music
La hora del cine español	La 2	1996-09-09		Movies
La hora H	Antena 3	1996-10-07	Jesús Hermida	Talk Show
Hospital	Antena 3	1996-07-01	Mercedes Sampietro	Drama Series
Hostal Royal Manzanares	TVE 1	1996-02-08	Lina Morgan	Sitcom
Hoy por ti	Antena 3	1996-02-02	Isabel Gemio	Reality show
Impactos	La 2	1996-04-14		Cultural
Llévatelo calentito, de verdad	TVE-1	1996-01-24	Los Morancos	Comedy
Mañanas de Primera	TVE-1	1996-09-09	Laura Valenzuela	Variety Show
Maravillas 10 y pico	Telecinco	1996-05-25	Quique Camoiras	Comedy
Más que coches	Telecinco	1996-02-04	José Ángel Fuentes	Cars
Menudas estrellas	Antena 3	1996-01-06	Bertín Osborne	Talent show
Menudo es mi padre	Antena 3	1996-04-15	El Fary	Sitcom
Noche de coplas	Antena 3	1996-05-18	Irma Soriano	Music
La noche de los magníficos	Antena 3	1996-01-05	Paula Vázquez	Variety Show
La noche prohibida	Antena 3	1996-04-19	José Coronado	Late night
La parodia nacional	Antena 3	1996-03-22	Constantino Romero	Comedy
Pelotas fuera	Antena 3	1996-08-03	Raquel Meroño	Videos
El primer café	Antena 3	1996-10-14	Antonio San José	Talk Show
Programa más o menos x o %	Canal+	1996-02-05	Aitor Merino	Children
Puerta a la fama	Telemadrid	1996-12-19	Juanma López Iturriaga	Talent show
Qué loca peluquería	Antena 3	1996-07-01	Mónica Randall	Sitcom
¡Qué memoria la mía!	Antena 3	1996-04-15	Marta Robles	Science/Culture
Redes	La 2	1996-02-10	Eduardo Punset	Science/Culture
Rompecocos	La 2	1996-05-06	Paco Vegara	Quiz Show
Schhh!	Telecinco	1996-03-06	Luis Meng	Music
La semana del guiñol	Canal+	1996-09-07		Comedy
Sonría, por favor	Telecinco	1996-04-08	Elsa Anka	Comedy
Sonrisas de España	Antena 3	1996-07-22	José Luis Coll	Comedy
Sorpresa, ¡Sorpresa!	Antena 3	1996-05-08	Isabel Gemio	Variety Show
Suena la copla	TVE-1	1996-04-09	Paco Valladares	Music
El súper	Telecinco	1996-09-06	Natalia Millán	Soap Opera
Tal como somos	TVE-1	1996-09-16	Ramón García	Variety Show
Tardes de Primera	TVE-1	1996-09-16	Àngel Casas	Talk Show
Tic-Tac	Telecinco	1996-03-16	Verónica Mengod	Children
Tierra a la vista	La 2	1996-05-09	Roge Blasco	Science/Culture
Todos los hombres sois iguales	Telecinco	1996-09-23	Josema Yuste	Sitcom
Todos somos humanos	Antena 3	1996-01-02	Javier Sardà	Videos
Turno de oficio: Diez años después	TVE-1	1996-04-20	Juan Luis Galiardo	Drama Series
Vuelta y vuelta	Telecinco	1996-12-26	José Antonio Abellán	Comedy
Yo, una mujer	Antena 3	1996-01-10	Concha Velasco	Drama Series

== Television shows ==
- La 1
  - Telediario (1957– )
  - Estudio estadio (1972–2005)
  - Informe Semanal (1973– )
  - Parlamento (1978–2014)
  - Barrio Sésamo (1979–2000)
  - El Precio justo (1988–2001)
  - Telepasión española (1990– )
  - Vídeos de primera (1990–1998)
  - Quién sabe dónde (1992–1998)
  - ¿Qué apostamos? (1993–2000)
  - Corazón, Corazón (1993–2010)
  - Sólo goles (1994–1997)
  - Testigo directo (1994–1999)
  - Cartelera (1994–2009)
  - Los Desayunos de TVE (1994–2020)
  - Cine de barrio (1995– )
  - Estamos de vuelta (1995–1997)
  - La Cocina de Arguiñano (1995–1998)
  - El Semáforo (1995–1999)
  - Mitomanía (1995–2001)
  - El Grand Prix del verano (1995–2005)
  - Gente (1995–2011)
- La 2
  - Al filo de lo imposble (1982– )
  - Pueblo de Dios (1982– )
  - Últimas preguntas (1983– )
  - En portada (1984– )
  - Estadio 2 (1984–2007)
  - Metrópolis (1985– )
  - Documentos TV (1986– )
  - Tendido cero (1986– )
  - Días de cine (1991– )
  - Línea 900 (1991–2007)
  - La Aventura del saber (1992– )
  - Jara y sedal (1992 -)
  - Pinnic (1992–1998)
  - Zona ACB (1993–2010)
  - Bricomanía (1994–2000)
  - La 2 noticias (1994–2020)
  - La noche temática, (1995– )
  - Makinavaja (1995–1997)
  - Mucha Marcha (1995–1999)
  - Un País en la mochila (1995–2000)
  - ¡Qué grande es el cine! (1995–2005)
- Antena 3
  - Antena 3 Noticias (1990– )
  - Lo que necesitas es amor (1993–1999)
  - Telemaratón (1993–2001)
  - A toda página (1994–1997)
  - En buenas manos (1994–2005)
  - Lluvia de estrellas (1995–2001)
  - Club Megatrix (1995–2013)
- Telecinco
  - Informativos Telecinco (1990– )
  - Telecupón (1990–1998)
  - La ruleta de la fortuna (1993–1997)
  - Esta noche cruzamos el Mississippi (1995–1997)
  - Nunca es tarde (1995–1997)
  - ¡Qué me dices! (1995–1998)
  - Médico de familia (1995–1999)
- Canal+
  - El día después (1990–2005)
  - Redacción (1990–2005)
  - Del 40 al 1 (1991–1998)
  - Lo + plus (1995–2005)
  - Las noticias del guiñol (1995–2005)

== Ending this year ==
- La 1
  - Club Disney (1990–1996)
  - Pasa la vida (1991–1996)
  - Esto es espectáculo (1994–1996)
  - Aquí jugamos todos (1995–1996)
  - Juntas, pero no revueltas (1995–1996)
  - La Noche de los castillos (1995–1996)
- La 2
  - Cifras y Letras (1991–1996)
  - Tal cual (1992–1996)
  - Lingo (1993–1996)
  - Función de noche (1994–1996)
  - El Lector (1994–1996)
  - Esto es lo que hay (1995–1996)
  - Zona franca (1995–1996)
- Antena 3
  - Cita con la vida (1993–1996)
  - Hermida y Cía (1993–1996)
  - Los ladrones van a la oficina (1993–1996)
  - Hermanos de leche (1994–1996)
  - Menudo Show (1995–1996)
  - Se busca (1995–1996)
- Telecinco
  - Su media naranja (1990–1996)
  - Karaoke (1994–1996)
  - ¡Aquí no hay quien duerma! (1995–1996)
  - Hora límite (1995–1996)
  - Uno para todas (1995–1996)

== Foreign series debuts in Spain ==
English title	Spanish title	Original title	Channel	Country	Performers
---	Alondra	Alondra	La 1	MEX	Ana Colchero
Beavis and Butthead	Beavis y Butthead		Canal +	USA	
Benjamin the Elephant	Benjamin Blumchen	Benjamin Blümchen	Canal +	GER	
Billy the Cat	El gato Billy		Canal +	BEL	
Bitter Blood	Sangre amarga		Antena 3	USA	Kelly McGillis
Booker	Booker		Telecinco	USA	Richard Grieco
---	Las locas peripecias de una familia	Bravo la famille	Canal +	FRA	
Coffee, with the scent of a woman	Café con aroma de mujer	Café con aroma de mujer	La 1	COL	Margarita Rosa de Francisco
Captain James Cook	Capitán Cook		La 1	AUS	Keith Michell
CHiPs	Chips		Telecinco	USA	Larry Wilcox
Dark Justice	Justicia ciega		La 1	USA	Bruce Abbott
Double Rush	Doble urgencia		Canal +	USA	Robert Pastorelli
Due South	Rumbo al sur		Antena 3	CAN	Paul Gross
Family Album	Álbum de familia		La 2	USA	Peter Scolari
Flipper	Las nuevas aventuras de Flipper		Antena 3	USA	Brian Wimmer
Flodder	Los Flodder		Telecinco	NED	Nelly Frijda
Hang Time	Un equipo con clase		Antena 3	USA	Reggie Theus
Heaven Help Us	Que el cielo nos ayude		Antena 3	USA	Andrew McCarthy, Mary Stuart Masterson
Home Improvement	Un chapuzas en casa		La 1	USA	Tim Allen
Homicide: Life on the Street	Homicidio		Antena 3	USA	Daniel Baldwin
---	Ka Ina	Ka Ina	La 1	VEN	Jean Carlo Simancas
Lady Owner	La dueña	La dueña	La 1	MEX	Angélica Rivera
Les Filles de Caleb	Emilie		Telecinco	CAN	Marina Orsini
Lost Civilizations	Civilizaciones perdidas		Canal +	USA	Sam Waterston
Love at First Sight	El flechazo	Coup de foudre	La 2	FRA	
---	María Mercedes	María Mercedes	La 1	MEX	Thalía
---	Marie Galante	Marie-Galante	La 1	FRA	Florence Pernel
Masked Rider	Masked Rider		Antena 3	USA	Ted Jan Roberts
Mission Top Secret	Mission Top Secret		La 2	AUS	Shane Briant
Moon Over Miami	Luna sobre Miami		FORTA	USA	Billy Campbell, Ally Walker
Mr. Belvedere	Mr. Belverde		Antena 3	USA	Christopher Hewett
Mrs. Pepper Pot	La señora Pimienta	Spoon Oba-san	Telecinco	JAP	
Murder One	Murder One		Telecinco	USA	Daniel Benzali, Anthony LaPaglia
My So-Called Life	Es mi vida		Canal +	USA	Bess Armstrong, Claire Danes
Navarro	Navarro	Navarro	La 1	FRA	Roger Hanin
Nurses	Enfermeras		La 2	USA	Arnetia Walker, Stephanie Hodge
Pacific Station	Comisaría Pacífico		La 2	USA	Robert Guillaume, Richard Libertini
---	Perla Negra	Perla negra	La 1	ARG	Andrea Del Boca
Robin's Hoods	Los ángeles de Robin		Antena 3	USA	Linda Purl
Robinson Sucroe	Robinson Sucroe	Robinson Sucroë	Canal +	FRA	
Scene of the Crime	La escena del crimen		Antena 3	USA	Teri Austin
Second Noah	Noe y familia		Telecinco	USA	Daniel Hugh Kelly
Something Wilder	Papá a los cincuenta		La 2	USA	Gene Wilder
T. J. Hooker	T.J. Hooker		Antena 3	USA	William Shatner
Brisco County	Brisco County		La 2	USA	Bruce Campbell
The Dukes of Hazzard	El sheriff chiflado		Telecinco	USA	Tom Wopat, John Schneider
The George Carlin Show	El Show de George Carlin		La 2	USA	George Carlin
The Man from Snowy River	La saga de los McGregor		La 2	USA	Andrew Clarke
The Outer Limits	Más allá del límite		FORTA	CAN	Alan Thicke
The Thin Blue Line	Ley y desorden		Canal +	UK	Rowan Atkinson
Time Trax	Misión en el tiempo		La 1	AUS	Dale Midkiff
Too Close for Comfort	Vecinas de papá		Telecinco	USA	Ted Knight
---	Vendetta	L'ombra nera del Vesuvio	La 1	ITA	Carlo Giuffrè

== Births ==
- 26 January – María Pedraza, actress.
- 21 February – Gloria Camila Ortega, pundit.
- 25 April – Miguel Herrán, actor.
- 4 July – Sofía Suescun, pundit.

== Deaths ==
- 7 January – Daniel Vindel, host, 64.
- 17 January – Pilar Trenas, journalist, 46.
- 17 February – Herta Frankel, marionetista, 83.
- 23 March – Irene Guerrero de Luna, actress de voz, 84.
- 5 April – Encarna Sánchez, hostess, 60.
- 2 May – María Luisa Ponte, actress, 77.
- 9 June – Rafaela Aparicio, actress, 90.
- 9 July – Aurora Redondo, actress, 96.
- 18 July – Javier Escrivá, actor, 65.
- 24 July – Nacho Martínez, actor, 44.
- 2 September – José María Comesaña, journalist, 47.
- 5 December – David Cubedo, host, 81.
- 27 December – Julián Mateos, actor, 58.

== See also ==
- 1996 in Spain
- List of Spanish films of 1996
