= 1998 in Spanish television =

This is a list of Spanish television related events in 1998.

== Events ==
- 17 April: Television channel Disney Channel starts broadcasting.
- 23 July: After 20 years in TVE journalist Matías Prats Luque signs for rival channel Antena 3 and becomes star host of the News magazine Antena 3 Noticias.
- 1 September: TV channel 40 TV starts broadcasting.
- 14 November: Pío Cabanillas Alonso is appointed Director General of RTVE.

== Debuts ==
| Title | Channel | Debut | Performers/Host | Genre |
|---|---|---|---|---|
| A las once en casa | TVE 1 | 1998-01-12 | Antonio Resines | Sitcom |
| Al habla | La 2 | 1998-10-27 | Jesús Marchamalo | Science/culture |
| Algo más que flamenco | La 2 | 1998-10-07 | Sara Baras | Music |
| Alta tensión | Antena 3 | 1998-09-14 | Constantino Romero | Quiz show |
| Ambiciones | Antena 3 | 1998-09-14 | Manuel Galiana | Soap spera |
| Atrévete a soñar | TVE 1 | 1998-01-14 | Julio Sabala | Variety show |
| Blasco Ibáñez | TVE 1 | 1998-02-25 | Ramón Langa | TV movie |
| Café con leche | TVE Internacional | 1998-09-15 | Santiago Ramos | Sitcom |
| Casi todo a cien | Telemadrid | 1998-07-18 | Francine Gálvez | News |
| Las claves | La 2 | 1998-09-24 | José Luis Balbín | Talk show |
| La cocina con fundamento | Telecinco | 1998-03-02 | Eva Arguiñano | Cooking show |
| Código Alfa | La 2 | 1998-10-02 | Patricia Betancort | News |
| La Comedia Musical | TVE 1 | 1998-05-07 | | Music |
| Compañeros | Antena 3 | 1998-03-25 | Francis Lorenzo | Drama series |
| Contraportada | Antena 3 | 1998-03-12 | Marta Robles | News |
| Cruce de caminos | Telecinco | 1998-10-17 | María Teresa Campos | News |
| De tres en tres | Antena 3 | 1998-03-30 | Goyo González | Quiz show |
| Dossier Directo | TVE 1 | 1998-06-10 | Manuel Giménez | News magazine |
| El día antes | Canal + | 1998-09-05 | Josep Pedrerol | Sport |
| Entre naranjos | TVE 1 | 1998-05-27 | Toni Cantó | Drama series |
| Esa copla me suena | TVE 1 | 1998-10-08 | María del Monte | Music |
| Esos locos bajitos | Antena 3 | 1998-07-15 | Bertín Osborne | Children |
| Este no es el programa de los viernes | TVE 1 | 1998-03-03 | Cruz y Raya | Comedy |
| Fernández y familia | Telecinco | 1998-08-02 | José Luis Gil | Sitcom |
| Furor | Antena 3 | 1998-10-03 | Alonso Caparrós | Quiz show |
| Hermanas | Telecinco | 1998-04-13 | Ángela Molina | Sitcom |
| Hoy de mañana | Antena 3 | 1998-09-21 | Ely del Valle | Variety show |
| Hoy en casa | Telecinco | 1998-05-16 | Isabel Preysler | Variety show |
| Hyakutake | La 2 | 1998-08-03 | Lucía Muñoz | Youth |
| Im presionante | Antena 3 | 1998-08-07 | Yvonne Reyes | Comedy |
| El informal | Telecinco | 1998-07-13 | Javier Capitán | Comedy |
| El juego del Euromillón | Telecinco | 1998-03-02 | Paula Vázquez | Quiz show |
| La llamada de la suerte | TVE 1 | 1998-02-06 | Ramón García | Game show |
| Lo tuyo es puro teatro | La 2 | 1998-11-20 | Natalia Dicenta | Theatre |
| Manos a la obra | Antena 3 | 1998-01-08 | Carlos Iglesias | Sitcom |
| Un menú de 7 estrellas | Antena 3 | 1998-01-19 | Agustín Bravo | Cooking show |
| Más madera | Telecinco | 1998-07-13 | Juan y Medio | Comedy |
| Un Millán de cosas | Telecinco | 1998-11-06 | Millán Salcedo | Comedy |
| La mirada crítica | Telecinco | 1998-01-12 | Vicente Vallés | News |
| La música es la pista | Telemadrid | 1998-07-20 | Mar Flores | Quiz show |
| Ni contigo ni sin ti | TVE 1 | 1998-02-19 | Pedro Osinaga | Sitcom |
| La noche de Carmen | Antena 3 | 1998-07-19 | Carmen Sevilla | Variety show |
| Noche de coplas | Antena 3 | 1998-10-10 | Irma Soriano | Music |
| Noche de impacto | Antena 3 | 1998-07-15 | Carlos García Hirschfeld | News magazine |
| La noche por delante | Telecinco | 1998-04-17 | Jordi González | Variety show |
| El ojo de la cámara | Canal + | 1998-10-31 | | Documentary |
| Patosos entre rejas | Telecinco | 1998-08-23 | Pepón Nieto | Videos |
| Parece mentira | Antena 3 | 1998-07-13 | Juanjo Prats | Videos |
| Pasiones cortas | La 2 | 1998-04-29 | | Movies |
| Peque Prix | TVE 1 | 1998-10-10 | Ramón García | Children |
| Perdona nuestros pecados | Telecinco | 1998-03-15 | Jordi Estadella | Videos |
| Periodistas | Telecinco | 1998-01-13 | José Coronado | Drama series |
| Pin Plus | Canal + | 1998-01-26 | | Documentary |
| Quítate tú pa ponerme yo | Telecinco | 1998-07-13 | Carlos Sobera | Sitcom |
| La ruta alternativa | La 2 | 1998-04-12 | | Documentary |
| Sabor a ti | Telecinco | 1998-07-27 | Ana Rosa Quintana | Variety show |
| La semana que viene | Antena 3 | 1998-09-20 | Julia Otero | Variety show |
| Señor alcalde | Telecinco | 1998-01-21 | Carlos Larrañaga | Sitcom |
| El séptimo de caballería | TVE 1 | 1998-09-14 | Miguel Bosé | Music |
| Sin límites | Antena 3 | 1998-04-06 | Jesús Hermida | Talk show |
| Tal como éramos | TVE 1 | 1998-07-06 | Jaime Bores | Variety show |
| Las tardes de Alicia | Telecinco | 1998-07-13 | Alicia Senovilla | Talk show |
| Tío Willy | TVE 1 | 1998-09-15 | Andrés Pajares | Sitcom |
| Toma nota | Telecinco | 1998-07-27 | Paloma Marín | Quiz show |
| Una de dos | TVE 1 | 1998-10-08 | Lina Morgan | Sitcom |
| Versión española | La 2 | 1998-10-06 | Cayetana Guillén Cuervo | Movies |
| La vida en el aire | La 2 | 1998-06-13 | Tristán Ulloa | Drama series |
| Vida y sainete | La 2 | 1998-06-07 | | Theatre |
| La virtud del asesino | La 2 | 1998-02-05 | Nacho Duato | Drama series |
| ¿Y tú bailas? | Telecinco | 1998-07-26 | Àngels Gonyalons | Talent show |

== Television shows ==
- La 1
  - Telediario (1957- )
  - Estudio estadio (1972-2005)
  - Informe Semanal (1973- )
  - Parlamento (1978-2014)
  - Barrio Sésamo (1979-2000)
  - Telepasión española (1990- )
  - ¿Qué apostamos? (1993-2000)
  - Corazón, Corazón (1993-2010)
  - Testigo directo (1994-1999)
  - Cartelera (1994-2009)
  - Los Desayunos de TVE (1994-2020)
  - Cine de barrio (1995- )
  - El Semáforo (1995-1999)
  - Mitomanía (1995-2001)
  - El Grand Prix del verano (1995-2005)
  - Gente (1995-2011)
  - Mucha marcha (1996-1999)
  - Corazón (1997- )
  - Digan lo que digan (1997-1999)
  - Risas y estrellas (1997-1999)
  - Calle nueva (1997-2000)
  - Música sí (1997-2004)
  - Saber vivir (1997-2009)
- La 2
  - Al filo de lo imposble (1982- )
  - Pueblo de Dios (1982- )
  - Últimas preguntas (1983- )
  - En portada (1984- )
  - Estadio 2 (1984-2007)
  - Metrópolis (1985- )
  - Documentos TV (1986- )
  - Tendido cero (1986- )
  - Días de cine (1991- )
  - Línea 900 (1991-2007)
  - La Aventura del saber (1992- )
  - Jara y sedal (1992- )
  - Zona ACB (1993-2010)
  - Bricomanía (1994-2004)
  - La 2 noticias (1994-2020)
  - La noche temática, (1995- )
  - Mucha Marcha (1995-1999)
  - Un País en la mochila (1995-2000)
  - ¡Qué grande es el cine! (1995-2005)
  - Empléate a fondo (1996-2000)
  - Redes (1996-2013)
  - Agrosfera (1997-)
  - El escarabajo verde (1997-)
  - Saber y ganar (1997-)
  - Quatro (1997-2000)
  - América total (1997-2004)
  - A su salud (1997-2004)
  - Negro sobre blanco (1997-2004)
  - Noche abierta, La (1997-2004)
  - El Tercer grado (1997-2004)
  - La Botica de la abuela (1997-2006)
  - En otras palabras (1997-2008)
  - La Mandrágora (1997-2009)
- Antena 3
  - Antena 3 Noticias (1990- )
  - Lo que necesitas es amor (1993-1999)
  - Telemaratón (1993-2001)
  - En buenas manos (1994-2005)
  - Lluvia de estrellas (1995-2001)
  - Club Megatrix (1995-2013)
  - Espejo público (1996- )
  - Sorpresa, ¡Sorpresa! (1996-1999)
  - La casa de los líos (1996-2000)
  - La Parodia nacional (1996-2001)
  - Menudas estrellas (1996-2002)
  - El Primer café (1996-2003)
  - Arévalo y cía (1997-1999)
  - El Kanguro de A3Z (1997-1999)
- Telecinco
  - Informativos Telecinco (1990- )
  - Médico de familia (1995-1999)
  - Ana (1996-1999)
  - El Súper (1996-1999)
  - Día a día (1996-2004)
  - Caiga quien caiga (1996-2008)
  - Más que amigos (1997-1999)
  - Moros y cristianos (1997-2001)
  - Al salir de clase (1997-2002)
  - Crónicas marcianas (1997-2005)
- Canal+
  - El día después (1990-2005)
  - Redacción (1990-2005)
  - Lo + plus (1995-2005)
  - Las noticias del guiñol (1995-2005)
  - Programa más o menos multiplicado o dividido (1996-1999)
  - Magacine (1996-2005)

== Ending this year ==
- La 1
  - Vídeos de primera (1990-1998)
  - Quién sabe dónde (1992-1998)
  - La Cocina de Arguiñano (1995-1998)
  - Hostal Royal Manzanares (1996-1998)
  - Entre Morancos y Omaitas (1997-1998)
  - Espejo secreto (1997-1998)
  - Flechazo, El (1997-1998)
  - No veas (1997-1998)
  - El Programa de Carlos Herrera (1997-1998)
- La 2
  - Pinnic (1992-1998)
  - El Imperdible (1997-1998)
  - PC adictos (1997-1998)
- Antena 3
  - Menudo es mi padre (1996-1998)
  - En antena (1997-1998)
  - Extra Rosa (1997-1998)
  - Impacto TV (1997-1998)
  - Situación de emergencia (1997-1998)
  - La Cara divertida (1997-1998)
- Telecinco
  - Telecupón (1990-1998)
  - ¡Qué me dices! (1995-1998)
  - Todos los hombres sois iguales (1996-1998)
  - El Concursazo (1997-1998)
  - De domingo a domingo (1997-1998)
  - Inocente, inocente (1997-1998)
  - Querido maestro (1997-1998)
- Canal +
  - Del 40 al 1 (1991-1998)

== Changes of network affiliation ==
| Show | Moved From | Moved To |
|---|---|---|
| Disney Club (1998-2007) | La 1 | Telecinco |

== Foreign series debuts in Spain ==
| English title | Spanish title | Original title | Channel | Country | Performers |
|---|---|---|---|---|---|
| 3rd Rock from the Sun | Cosas de marcianos | | Antena 3 | USA | John Lithgow |
| 7th Heaven | Siete en el paraíso | | Telecinco | USA | Stephen Collins |
| Blood & Orchids | Sangre y orquídeas | | La 2 | USA | Kris Kristofferson, Jane Alexander |
| Brooklyn South | Brooklyn sur | | FORTA | USA | Jon Tenney |
| --- | Café con aroma de mujer | | La 2 | COL | Margarita Rosa de Francisco |
| Central Park West | Central Park West | | La 1 | USA | Mädchen Amick |
| --- | Misión eureka | Das Sahara-Projekt | La 1 | GER | Heinz Bennent |
| Dawson's Creek | Dawson crece | | Canal + | USA | James Van Der Beek |
| Father Dowling Mysteries | Padre Dowling | | Telecinco | USA | Tom Bosley |
| From the Earth to the Moon | De la Tierra a la Luna | | Canal + | USA | Tom Hanks |
| Fudge | Fudge | | FORTA | USA | Jake Richardson |
| High Incident | Patrulla de asfalto | | Telecinco | USA | Dylan Bruno |
| --- | Huracán | Huracán | La 1 | MEX | Angélica Rivera |
| Ink | Kate y Mike | | Telecinco | USA | Ted Danson, Mary Steenburgen |
| Inspector Rex | Rex, un policía diferente | | Antena 3 | AUT | Tobias Moretti |
| Just Shoot Me! | Dame un respiro | | Canal + | USA | Laura San Giacomo |
| --- | Leonela, muriendo de amor | Leonela, muriendo de amor | La 1 | PER | Mariana Levy |
| --- | Luz María | Luz María | La 1 | PER | Angie Cepeda |
| Marmalade Boy | La familia crece | Mamarēdo Bōi | La 2 | JAP | |
| Pacific Blue | Pacific Blue | | FORTA | USA | Jim Davidson |
| Pauly | Pauly | | Canal + | USA | Pauly Shore |
| Profiler | Profiler | | Antena 3 | USA | Ally Walker |
| Sabrina the Teenage Witch | Sabrina, cosas de brujas | | Antena 3 | USA | Melissa Joan Hart |
| Secret Service Guy | Loco servicio secreto | | Canal + | USA | Judge Reinhold |
| Seinfeld | Seinfeld | | Canal + | USA | Jerry Seinfeld |
| --- | Serie rosa | Série rose | La 1 | FRA | Anne Fontaine |
| Sex in Hollywood | Sexo en Hollywwod | | Canal + | USA | Timothy Stack |
| Superhuman Samurai | Superhuman Samurai | | Antena 3 | USA | |
| The Baldy Man | Baldy Man | | FORTA | UK | |
| The Directors | Directores de cine | | Canal + | USA | |
| The Entertainment Business | El negocio de Hollywood | | Canal + | USA | |
| The Monroes | Los Monroe | | Telecinco | USA | William Devane, Susan Sullivan |
| The Women of Brewster Place | Las mujeres de Brewster Place | | La 2 | USA | Oprah Winfrey |
| Thunder Alley | El callejón del trueno | | La 2 | USA | Ed Asner |
| Unhappily Ever After | Infelices para Siempre | | La 2 | USA | Geoff Pierson, Stephanie Hodge |

== Deaths ==
- 2 May - Antonio Herrero, journalist, 43
- 9 May - Adolfo Waitzman, composer, 68
- 16 May - Mayrata O'Wisiedo, actress, 69
- 12 June - Torrebruno, host, 61
- 22 October - Ángel Picazo, actor, 81
- 24 October - Rafael Alonso, actor, 78
- 27 October - Luis Prendes, actor, 85
- 22 November - José Antonio Plaza, director & host, 58
- 27 November - Gloria Fuertes, poet, 81
- 26 December - Tote García Ortega, actress, 83

== See also ==
- 1998 in Spain
- List of Spanish films of 1998
