= 1990 in Spanish television =

This is a list of Spanish television related events in 1990.

== Events ==
- 25 January: Antena 3, first private TV Channel in Spain is launched. Therefore, State-owned TVE's monopoly on broadcasting activity is over, after 33 years.
- 23 February: Jordi García Candau is appointed Director General of RTVE.
- 3 March: New TV cannel Telecinco is launched with an inaugural ceremony at Lope de Vega Theatre (Madrid).
- 5 May: Azúcar Moreno represents Spain at the Eurovision Song Contest 1990 held in Zagreb (Yugoslavia) with the song Bandido, ranking 5th and scoring 96 points .
- 8 June: Canal+, first scrambled TV channel in Spain is launched.

== Debuts ==
Title	Channel	Debut	Performers/Host	Genre
A debate	TVE-1	1990-10-15	Mercé Remolí	Talk Show
Absolutamente grandes	Antena 3	1990-02-01	José Ramón Pardo	Music
Al fin música	Antena 3	1990-01-28	Rafael Benedito	Music
Antena 3 Noticias	Antena 3	1990-01-25	Luis Herrero	News
Arco iris	Telecinco	1990-06-06	Mercedes Rodríguez de la Fuente	Science/Culture
Aventura, aventura	Canal +	1990-12-02	Pablo Carbonell	Science/Culture
¡Ay, que calor!	Telecinco	1990-10-04	Luis Cantero	Quiz Show
Bellezas al agua	Telecinco	1990-06-23	Norma Duval	Quiz Show
Butaca de salón	La 2	1990-07-28		Music
Carandelario	Antena 3	1990-01-25	Luis Carandell	Science/Culture
Cheque en blanco	Telecinco	1990-04-15		Variety Show
Chistes de verano	Telecinco	1990-06-20		Comedy
Movies 5 estrellas	Telecinco	1990-04-18		Movies
Ciudades perdidas	TVE-1	1990-02-07	Vicente Simón	Documentary
Club Disney	TVE-1	1990-10-06	Juanjo Pardo	Children
Crónica en negro	Antena 3	1990-04-17	Manuel Marlasca	Reality Show
De tú a tú	Antena 3	1990-06-25	Nieves Herrero	Variety Show
Del 40 al 1	Canal +	1990-09-29	Fernandisco	Music
Del Miño al Bidasoa	TVE-1	1990-11-11	José Antonio Labordeta	Documentary
Sport noche	TVE-1	1990-09-22		Sport
Dibuja 2	La 2	1990-09-19		Children
Discoteca de verano	Telecinco	1990-07-03		Music
Domingo en rojo	Antena 3	1990-01-28	Lydia Bosch	Variety Show
Dos cadenas para ti	La 2	1990-04-22	Guillermo Summers	Videos
El Duende del globo	TVE-1	1990-04-16	Marisa Tejada	Children
El día después	Canal +	1990-10-08	Ignacio Lewin	Sport
El gordo	Antena 3	1990-09-23	José Coronado	Quiz Show
El gran musical	Canal +	1990-09-18		Music
El marco de la fama	TVE-1	1990-04-04		Music
El martes que viene	TVE-1	1990-01-30	Mercedes Milá	Talk Show
El obispo leproso	TVE-1	1990-11-23	Silvia Munt	Drama Series
El orgullo de la huerta	Antena 3	1990-10-07	Fernando Delgado	Sitcom
El planeta frágil	TVE-1	1990-06-25		Documentary
El Tercer tiempo	Canal +	1990-10-19	Joaquín Maroto	Sport
En buena hora	TVE-1	1990-04-16	Joaquín Arozamena	Variety Show
En jaque	TVE-1	1990-09-21	Leontxo García	Science/Culture
En verano	TVE-1	1990-07-17	Goyo González	Variety Show
Encuentro juvenil con Banesto	TVE-1	1990-10-06	Nicolás Romero	Youth
Entre hoy y mañana	Telecinco	1990-05-03	Luis Mariñas	News
Entre platos anda el juego	Telecinco	1990-10-08	Juanito Navarro	Quiz Show
Esa clase de gente	La 2	1990-01-17	Luis Prendes	Sitcom
Espiral: Detrás de la noticia	La 2	1990-10-04	José Antonio Martínez Soler	News
Esta es su casa	TVE-1	1990-09-17	María Teresa Campos	Variety Show
Eva y Adán, agencia matrimonial	TVE-1	1990-09-23	Verónica Forqué	Sitcom
Galería de música	La 2	1990-09-18		Music
Glasnost	La 2	1990-01-13	Àlex Casanovas	Science/Culture
Gran concierto	Antena 3	1990-02-07		Music
Hablando se entiende la gente	Telecinco	1990-03-30	José Luis Coll	Talk show
Hablemos de sexo	TVE-1	1990-03-05	Elena Ochoa	Science/Culture
¡Hip hip hurra!	Telecinco	1990-07-14		Sport
Hoy de 6 a 7	TVE-1	1990-07-02	Concha Galán	Variety Show
J.M. presenta	Antena 3	1990-01-25	Juanjo Menéndez	Late Night
Jueves 22.30	Antena 3	1990-09-28	Antonio Herrero	Talk Show
Klip	La 2	1990-01-16		
La forja de un rebelde	TVE-1	1990-03-30	Antonio Valero	Drama Series
La guardería	Antena 3	1990-01-29	Rita Irasema	Children
La merienda	Antena 3	1990-03-08	Miliki	Children
La mujer de tu vida	TVE-1	1990-02-09	Carmen Maura	Drama Series
Pájaro en una tormenta	TVE-1	1990-09-21	Maribel Verdú	Drama Series
La picota	Antena 3	1990-01-25	Pedro J. Ramírez	News
La quinta marcha	Telecinco	1990-10-07	Penélope Cruz	Music
La ruleta de la fortuna	Antena 3	1990-01-25	Mayra Gómez Kemp	Quiz Show
La salud es lo que importa	Antena 3	1990-02-02	Bartolomé Beltrán	Science/Culture
La Tabla Redonda	La 2	1990-10-16		Science/Culture
La Tarántula	Antena 3	1990-01-25	Antonio Herrero	Talk Show
La tertulia	Antena 3	1990-01-29	Miguel Ángel García Juez	Talk Show
Lo mejor de la semana	Antena 3	1990-02-11		News
Los 40 principales	Canal +	1990-09-18		Music
Los felices 80	La 2	1990-09-25	Xabier Elorriaga	Science/Culture
Los Fruittis	TVE-1	1990-09-30		Anime
Los mundiales y sus goles	Telecinco	1990-05-10		Sport
Los segundos cuentan	Antena 3	1990-01-26	Elisenda Roca	Quiz Show
Madrugada pop	Telecinco	1990-05-19		Music
Muerte a destiempo	La 2	1990-09-25	Carmelo Gómez	Drama Series
Música N.A.	TVE-1	1990-01-20	Ramón Trecet	Music
No te lo pierdas	TVE-1	1990-04-28	Leticia Sabater	Children
No te rías, que es peor	TVE-1	1990-10-01	Jordi Estadella	Comedy
Noche de lobos	Antena 3	1990-04-22	Joan Lluís Goas	Movies
Noticias de la economía	Antena 3	1990-10-12	Fernando González Urbaneja	News
Oh Vídeo	Antena 3	1990-03-06	Paloma García Álvarez	Videos
Piezas canal +	Canal +	1990-09-14		Science/Culture
Polvo de estrellas	Antena 3	1990-01-27	Carlos Pumares	Movies
Por el ancho mundo	La 2	1990-04-08		Science/Culture
Primer plano	Canal +	1990-09-29		Movies
Primera fila	TVE-1	1990-05-02	Antonio Martín Benítez	Talk Show
Que sabe nadie	Telemadrid	1990-10-16	Jesús Quintero	Talk Show
Querido cabaret	TVE-1	1990-11-16	Guillermina Motta	Music
Rápido	La 2	1990-09-04		Music
Redacción	Canal +	1990-10-12		News
Ricos y famosos	Antena 3	1990-09-21	Lola Forner	News
Sábado deporte	La 2	1990-09-22		Sport
Sara y punto	La 2	1990-09-23	Sara Montiel	Variety Show
Simplemente Mayra	Antena 3	1990-01-28	Mayra Gómez Kemp	Talk Show
Stop, seguridad en marcha	TVE-1	1990-02-02		
Su media naranja	Telecinco	1990-03-27	Jesús Puente	Quiz Show
Superguay	Telecinco	1990-03-29		Children
Te veo de noche	TVE-1	1990-10-13	Els Comediants	Comedy
Tele 5 ¿dígame?	Telecinco	1990-10-06	Laura Valenzuela	Variety Show
Telecupón	Telecinco	1990-03-05	Silvia Marsó	Quiz Show
Telemundo	Antena 3	1990-03-10	Karina Pardevilla	Variety Show
Telepasión española	TVE-1	1990-12-31		Music
Teletienda	Antena 3	1990-03-05	Miguel Ángel Nieto	Adds
Testigos del siglo XX	La 2	1990-10-10		Science/Culture
Tutti frutti	Telecinco	1990-04-07	Cruz y Raya	Comedy
TV educativa	La 2	1990-09-18		Science/Culture
Un día es un día	TVE-1	1990-04-20	Ángel Casas	Talk Show
Un País de locos	Antena 3	1990-02-06	Alfredo Amestoy	News
Un solo mundo	TVE-1	1990-05-21	Ernesto Sáenz de Buruaga	Science/Culture
Video-Mix	La 2	1990-04-02		Music
Vídeos de primera	TVE-1	1990-09-18	Alfonso Arús	Videos
VIP	Telecinco	1990-03-05	José Luis Moreno	Quiz Show
Vip Guay	Telecinco	1990-09-30	Emilio Aragón	Quiz Show
Vip Mar	Telecinco	1990-07-07	Emilio Aragón	Quiz Show
VIP Noche	Telecinco	1990-03-12	José Luis Moreno	Quiz Show
Viva el espectáculo	TVE-1	1990-01-19	Concha Velasco	Variety Show
Viva la ciencia	TVE-1	1990-04-28	Manuel Toharia	Science/Culture
Y ahora Encarna	Antena 3	1990-11-27	Encarna Sánchez	Talk Show

== Television shows ==
=== La 1 ===
- Telediario (1957– )
- Estudio estadio (1972–2005)
- Informe Semanal (1973– )
- Parlamento (1978–2014)
- De película (1982–1991)
- Con las manos en la masa (1984–1991)
- Los Marginados (1984–1991)
- Punto y aparte (1985–1991)
- Hablando claro (1987–1992)
- Cajón desastre (1988–1991)
- Juego de niños (1988–1991)
- Juegos sin fronteras (1988–1992)
- Rockopop (1988–1992)
- El Precio justo (1988–2001)
- Aventura 92 (1989–1991)
- Pero... ¿esto qué es? (1989–1991)
- Sopa de gansos (1989–1991)
- Tribunal popular (1989–1991)
- Waku waku (1989–1991)
- Brigada Central (1989–1993)

=== La 2 ===
- Al filo de lo imposble (1982– )
- Pueblo de Dios (1982– )
- Últimas preguntas (1983– )
- En portada (1984– )
- Jazz entre amigos (1984–1991)
- Estadio 2 (1984–2007)
- Metrópolis (1985– )
- Documentos TV (1986– )
- Tendido cero (1986– )
- El Tiempo es oro (1987–1992)
- Plàstic (1989–1991)

== Ending this year ==
=== La 1 ===
- Buenos días (1986–1990)
- 3x4 (1988–1990)
- A través del espejo (1988–1990)
- Entre líneas (1988–1990)
- A mi manera (1989–1990)
- Corazón (1989–1990)
- La Corona mágica (1989–1990)
- El Día por delante (1989–1990)
- La Luna (1989–1990)
- Sábado revista (1989–1990)

=== La 2 ===
- Cerca de las estrellas (1988–1990)
- La casa por la ventana (1989–1990)
- Nuestra Europa (1989–1990)
- El Nuevo espectador (1989–1990)
- El Tiempo en que vivimos (1989–1990)

== Foreign series debuts in Spain ==
English title	Spanish title	Original title	Channel	Country	Performers
A kind of living	Una forma de vivir		La 1	UK	Anita Carey
ALF Tales	Los cuentos de ALF		La 1	USA	Paul Fusco
Automan	Automan		Telecinco	USA	Desi Arnaz Jr.
Benson	Benson		FORTA	USA	Robert Guillaume
Captain Tsubasa	Campeones	Kyaputen Tsubasa	Telecinco	JAP	
Champion Joe	El campeón	Ashita no Joe	Antena 3	JAP	
Check It Out!	Pase por caja		Telecinco	CAN	Don Adams
Chelmsford 123	Chelmosford 123		FORTA	UK	Rory McGrath
China Beach	Playa de China		La 1	USA	Dana Delany
–	Cristal	Cristal	La 1	VEN	Jeannette Rodríguez, Lupita Ferrer, Carlos Mata
Danger Bay	Bahía peligrosa		FORTA	CAN	Donnelly Rhodes
Derrick	El inspector Derrick	Derrick	Telecinco	GER	Horst Tappert
Diff'rent Strokes	Arnold		Telecinco	USA	Conrad Bain, Gary Coleman
Dinky Dog	El perro Dinky		La 2	USA	
Dirty Dozen, The Series	Doce del patíbulo		La 1	USA	Ben Murphy
Dinosaucers	Dinosaucers		FORTA	USA CAN	
Doogie Howser, M.D.	Un médico precoz		Telecinco	USA	Neil Patrick Harris
Dragon Ball	Bola de dragón	Doragon Bōru	FORTA	JAP	
Emerald Point N.A.S.	Escándalo en la marina		Antena 3	USA	Dennis Weaver
Family Ties	Enredos de familia		Telecinco	USA	Meredith Baxter, Michael Gross, Michael J. Fox
---	Fera Radical	Fera radical	Antena 3	BRA	Malu Mader
Festival of Family Classics	Clásicos familiares		La 1	USA	
Friday the 13th: The Series	Misterio para tres		Telecinco	USA	John D. LeMay
Galaxy Express 999	Galaxy Express 999	Ginga Tetsudō 999	Canal+	JAP	
---	Gallito Ramírez	Gallito Ramírez	FORTA	COL	Carlos Vives
Game, Set and Match	Juego, set y partido		La 1	UK	Ian Holm
Ganbare, Kickers!	Supergol	Ganbare, Kikkāzu	Telecinco	JAP	
Grimm's Fairy Tale Classics	Soñar con los ojos abiertos	Gurimu Meisaku Gekijou	Telecinco	JAP	
Hogan's Heroes	Los héroes de Hogan		Antena 3	USA	Bob Crane
Hold the Dream	Mantén vivo el sueño		La 2	UK	Jenny Seagrove, Stephen Collins
Houston Knights	Los caballeros de Houston		La 1	USA	Michael Beck
In the Heat of the Night	En el calor de la noche		Antena 3	USA	Carroll O'Connor
Jack the Ripper	Jack, el destripador		La 1	USA UK	Michael Caine, Jane Seymour
Janosch's Dream World	La hora de sueños de Janosch	Janoschs Traumstunde	FORTA	GER	
Jason King	Jason King		Antena 3	UK	Peter Wyngarde
Jem and the Holograms	Jem, Chica Pop		Telecinco	USA	
Till We Meet Again	Volveremos a vernos		Antena 3	USA	Courteney Cox
Kidd Video	Kidd Video		FORTA	USA	
King of the Olympics	Historias de cada día		La 2	USA	David Selby
Knights of the Zodiac	Los caballeros del Zodiaco	Seinto Seiya	La 2	JAP	
	La condesa de Charny	La Comtesse de Charny	La 1	FRA	Anne Jacquemin
---	La feria de las vanidades	La feria de las vanidades	FORTA	COL	Rebeca López
---	La intrusa	La intrusa	Antena 3	VEN	Mariela Alcalá
---	La isla	La isla	La 1	PRI	Gladys Rodríguez
Lady in Rose	La dama de rosa	La dama de rosa	La 1	VEN	Jeannette Rodríguez, Carlos Mata
Little Lord Fauntleroy	El pequeño lord	Shōkōshi Sedi	Telecinco	JAP	
Liveman	Bioman	Chōjū Sentai Liveman	La 1	JAP	
Looney Tunes Comedy Hour	La hora Warner		La 1	USA	
Loving	Loving		Telecinco	USA	Wesley Addy
Chappy the Witch	Chapi y la princesa	Mahō Tsukai Chappy	La 2	JAP	
Maid Marian and her Merry Men	Maid Marian and her Merry Men		FORTA	UK	Kate Lonergan
Mancuso, F.B.I.	Mancuso		Antena 3	USA	Robert Loggia
Max Headroom	Max Headroom		FORTA	USA	Matt Frewer
Mr. Horn	Mr. Horn		La 1	USA	David Carradine
Mr. Potato Head	La familia Potato		La 2	USA	
Murphy Brown	Murphy Brown		La 1	USA	Candice Bergen
Nutcracker: Money, Madness and Murder	Cascanueces		La 2	USA	Lee Remick
Ovide and the Gang	Ovidio y su banda		FORTA	CAN	
Paper Dolls	Muñecas de papel		Antena 3	USA	Lloyd Bridges, Morgan Fairchild
---	Pasionaria	Pasionaria	Antena 3	VEN	Catherine Fulop, Fernando Carrillo
Perfect Strangers	Primos lejanos		Canal+	USA	Bronson Pinchot, Mark Linn-Baker
Peter Pan: The Animated Series	Las aventuras de Peter	Pītā Pan no Bōken	La 1	JAP	
---	Piazza Navona	Piazza Navona	La 2	ITA	Marcello Mastroianni
Philip Marlowe, Private Eye	Philip Marlowe		La 1	USA	Powers Boothe
Police Academy	Loca academia de policía		La 1	USA	
Press Gang	La pandilla plumilla		Canal+	UK	Julia Sawalha
Queen Millennia	Exploradores del espacio	Shin Taketori Monogatari Sennen Joou	Telecinco	JAP	
Queenie (miniseries)	Queenie		La 2	USA	Mia Sara
Rambo: The Force of Freedom	Rambo: la fuerza de la libertad		FORTA	USA	
Randall and Hopkirk (Deceased)	Randall y Hopkirk		Antena 3	UK	Mike Pratt, Kenneth Cope
Roads to	Camino de Xanadú		La 2	UK	
Robotech	Robotech		Telecinco	USA JAP	
Roque Santeiro	Roque Santeiro	Roque Santeiro	Antena 3	BRA	Regina Duarte
---	Rosa...de lejos	Rosa...de lejos	FORTA	ARG	Leonor Benedetto
Rupert	El osito Rupert		La 1	UK	
Sara Dane	Sara Dane		Antena 3	AUS	Juliet Jordan
---	Señora	Señora	Telecinco	VEN	Caridad Canelón
Sherlock Holmes	Las nuevas aventuras de Sherlock Holmes		FORTA	UK	Jeremy Brett
Star Trek: The Next Generation	Star Trek: La nueva generación		FORTA	USA	Patrick Stewart
Story of the Alps: My Annette	Las montañas de Ana	Arupusu Monogatari Watashi no Annetto	Telecinco	JAP	
Strange Report	Enemigos del crimen		Antena 3	UK	Anthony Quayle
Surgical Spirit	Tira y afloja		La 1	UK	Nichola McAuliffe
Tales from the Crypt	Historias de la cripta		La 1	USA	
Teenage Mutant Ninja Turtles	Tortugas Ninja		FORTA	USA	
The Adventurer	El aventurero		Antena 3	UK	Gene Barry
The Adventures of the Galaxy Rangers	La patrulla galáctica		FORTA	USA	
The Adventures of Raggedy Ann and Andy	Ann y Andy		FORTA	USA	
The Blinkins	Las Blinkins		La 1	USA	
The Bretts	Los Brett		La 2	UK	Norman Rodway
The Hitchhiker	El autoestopista		La 1	CAN	Page Fletcher
The Hogan Family	La familia Hogan		La 1	USA	Valerie Harper
The Jungle Book	El libro de la selva	Janguru Bukku shonen Môguri	Antena 3	JAP	
The Karate Kid	Karate Kid		FORTA	USA	
The Long Hot Summer	El largo y cálido verano		Antena 3	USA	Don Johnson
The Mystic Warrior	El guerrero místico		FORTA	USA	Robert Beltran
The New Lassie	Lassie		Telecinco	USA	
The Nineteenth Hole	El hoyo 19		La 1	UK	Eric Sykes
The Raccoons	Los Mapaches		La 1	CAN	
The Real Ghostbusters	Los cazafantasmas		Canal+	USA	
The revenge	La revancha		Telecinco	VEN	Rosalinda Serfaty
The Wonder Years	Aquellos maravillosos años		La 1	USA	Fred Savage
The Young Riders	Jóvenes jinetes		La 1	USA	Stephen Baldwin, Josh Brolin
TigerSharks	Los tigres del mar		FORTA	USA	
Tiny Toon Adventures	Tiny Toons		Canal+	USA	
Tour of Duty	Camino del infierno		Telecinco	USA	Stephen Caffrey
Twin Peaks	Twin Peaks		Telecinco	USA	Kyle MacLachlan
Unsolved Mysteries	Misterios sin resolver		La 2	USA	Robert Stack
Valentine Park	Valentine Park		La 1	USA	Ken Jones
Webster	Webster		La 1	USA	Susan Clark, Alex Karras, Emmanuel Lewis
Wolcott	Wolcott		Antena 3	UK	George Harris
Zoo Family	La familia del zoo		La 1	AUS	Peter Curtin

== Births ==
- 6 March – Clara Lago, actress.
- 27 March – Natalia Sánchez, actress.
- 23 October – Javier de Hoyos, journalist

== Deaths ==
- 16 January – Nacho Dogan, disc-jockey & host, 38.
- 24 March – Margarita Calahorra, actress, 60.
- 7 April – Modesto Blanch, actor, 90.
- 1 July – Mario Cabré, host, 74.
- 16 July – Tomás Blanco, actor, 79.
- 23 August – Antolín García, journalist, 62.
- 5 October – Félix Dafauce, actor, 93.

== See also ==
- 1990 in Spain
- List of Spanish films of 1990
