= 1994 in Spanish television =

This is a list of Spanish television related events in 1994.

== Events ==
- 8 January: Televisión Española (TVE) channel Canal Clasico starts broadcasting.
- 14 February: Teledeporte, first sports channel owned by TVE, is launched through Hispasat.
- 4 March: TV channel Cartoon Network España launches.
- 16 April: For the first time a private TV channel, Antena 3 gets higher monthly audience share than the State-owned La Primera (TVE).
- 10 October: TVE channel Hispavision (later known as Docu TVE) starts broadcasting.
- 14–15 October: TVE stages in Valencia the OTI Festival 1994, which is broadcast live throughout Ibero-America.
- 25 November: TVE's show El primijuego, hosted by Teresa Viejo, offers the highest prize in Spanish Television History, 100.000.000 pesetas (€601,012).

== Debuts ==
| Title | Channel | Debut | Performers/Host | Genre |
|---|---|---|---|---|
| 100 años de cine | Canal + | 1994-07-20 | | Movies |
| A su servicio | TVE-1 | 1994-11-03 | Fernando Fernán Gómez | Sitcom |
| A toda página | Antena 3 | 1994-07-18 | Marta Robles | News |
| Adivina quién miente esta noche | TVE-1 | 1994-07-10 | Elena Markínez | Quiz Show |
| Al grano | La 2 | 1994-04-21 | Lorenzo Milá | Youth |
| Al hilo de la vida | TVE-1 | 1994-01-22 | Ricardo Stelrich | Science/Culture |
| Amigos para siempre | Antena 3 | 1994-07-27 | Carlos Fuentes | Solidario |
| ¡Ay, Señor, Señor! | Antena 3 | 1994-04-04 | Andrés Pajares | Sitcom |
| Bricomania | La 2 | 1994-07-23 | Kristian Pielhoff | Science/Culture |
| Campeones de la playa | Telecinco | 1994-07-02 | Leticia Sabater | Youth |
| Canguros | Antena 3 | 1994-09-23 | Maribel Verdú | Sitcom |
| Cartelera | TVE-1 | 1994-09-24 | Jose Toledo | Movies |
| Centros de poder | La 2 | 1994-10-09 | Julia Navarro | Talk Show |
| ¡Chooof! | La 2 | 1994-10-29 | El Tricicle | Comedy |
| Clip, clip ¡Hurra! | La 2 | 1994-08-01 | | Music |
| Colección canal + | Canal + | 1994-02-25 | | Variety Show |
| Comer es un placer | Telecinco | 1994-02-21 | Alfredo Amestoy | Cooking Show |
| ¿Cómo lo hacen? | TVE-1 | 1994-07-10 | Jordi Hurtado | Variety Show |
| Compuesta y sin novio | Antena 3 | 1994-09-19 | Lina Morgan | Sitcom |
| Confesiones | Antena 3 | 1994-09-23 | Carlos Carnicero | Reality show |
| ¿De qué parte estás? | Telecinco | 1994-02-21 | José María Íñigo | Debate |
| Desde Lepe con humor | TVE-1 | 1994-09-05 | Miguel Ortiz | Especial |
| Directo directo | TVE-1 | 1994-04-11 | José Luis Delgado Sánchez | News |
| ¡Domingo Fiesta! | TVE-1 | 1994-06-12 | | Children |
| El Chou | Antena 3 | 1994-01-07 | Alfonso Arús | Comedy |
| El cine más largo | TVE-1 | 1994-07-29 | | Movies |
| El coraje de vivir | Antena 3 | 1994-10-16 | Lola Flores | Documentary |
| El día que me quieras | La 2 | 1994-10-05 | | Drama Drama Series |
| El gran cine de La 2 | La 2 | 1994-09-23 | | Movies |
| El juego de los anuncios | Antena 3 | 1994-02-06 | | Quiz Show |
| El Lector | La 2 | 1994-10-05 | Agustín Remesal | Science/Culture |
| El planeta de los toros | Canal + | 1994-07-10 | Manuel F. Molés | Toros |
| El Retonno | TVE-1 | 1994-03-21 | Martes y Trece | Comedy |
| El sábado con fundamento | TVE-1 | 1994-10-22 | Karlos Arguiñano | Cooking Show |
| El sexólogo | TVE-1 | 1994-10-04 | Antonio Ozores | Sitcom |
| El Trampolín | Telecinco | 1994-07-07 | Pedro Rollán | Talent show |
| En buenas manos | Antena 3 | 1994-01-19 | Bartolomé Beltrán | Science/Culture |
| Estamos todos locos | Antena 3 | 1994-11-12 | Pepe Navarro | Comedy |
| Esto es espectáculo | TVE-1 | 1994-11-04 | Bárbara Rey | Variety Show |
| Esto no es lo que parece | La 2 | 1994-10-13 | Jordi Estadella | Talk Show |
| Función de noche | La 2 | 1994-09-03 | | Theatre |
| Genio y figura | Antena 3 | 1994-07-24 | Pepe Carrol | Comedy |
| Gomaespuma | Telecinco | 1994-03-26 | Gomaespuma | Comedy |
| Grada cero | La 2 | 1994-10-08 | | Sport |
| Gran Fiesta | Telecinco | 1994-01-14 | Yvonne Reyes | Variety Show |
| Gran programa doble | TVE-1 | 1994-02-12 | | Movies |
| Hermanos de leche | Antena 3 | 1994-04-10 | José Coronado | Sitcom |
| Hip, Hip, Hipnosis | Telecinco | 1994-04-22 | Bibí Andersen | Etretenimiento |
| Historias de amor de Isabel Gemio | Antena 3 | 1994-03-07 | Isabel Gemio | Variety Show |
| Historias de la puta mili | Telecinco | 1994-04-15 | Juan Diego | Sitcom |
| Imágenes prohibidas | La 2 | 1994-02-05 | | Documentary |
| Invitación de boda | Telecinco | 1994-07-02 | Álvaro Santamaría | Sociedad |
| Karaoke | Telecinco | 1994-06-27 | Paco Morales | Music |
| La 2 noticias | La 2 | 1994-11-07 | Lorenzo Milá | News |
| La ley del jurado | TVE-1 | 1994-10-13 | Javier Nart | Science/Culture |
| La liga en casa | Canal + | 1994-06-05 | | Sport |
| La senda | Antena 3 | 1994-01-24 | José Luis Balbín | Talk Show |
| La vida alrededor | Telecinco | 1994-10-04 | María José Sáez | Variety Show |
| La vuelta de la fama | TVE-1 | 1994-04-23 | Ángeles Martín | Quiz Show |
| Libre y directo | Antena 3 | 1994-07-30 | Andrés Aberasturi | Talk show |
| Los desayunos de TVE | TVE-1 | 1994-01-14 | Julio César Iglesias | News |
| Los periódicos | Telecinco | 1994-02-21 | Fernando Ónega | News |
| Los unos y los otros | TVE-1 | 1994-04-21 | Ángel Casas | Debate |
| Luz roja | TVE-1 | 1994-10-13 | Elena Ochoa | Science/Culture |
| Más deporte | Canal + | 1994-09-04 | | Sport |
| Mi querida España | Telecinco | 1994-02-21 | Laura Valenzuela | Variety Show |
| Mis bodas reales | Antena 3 | 1994-11-30 | Jaime Peñafiel | Sociedad |
| Misterios del domingo | Telecinco | 1994-04-24 | Julián Lago | Sucesos |
| Móntatelo | TVE-1 | 1994-07-22 | Las Veneno | Quiz Show |
| Muévete | Telecinco | 1994-03-20 | Teresa Rabal | Children |
| ¡No me lo puedo creer! | TVE-1 | 1994-07-13 | Ángeles Martín | Quiz Show |
| Nos vamos de vacaciones | Antena 3 | 1994-07-18 | Emilio Aragón | Especial |
| Novedades increíbles | Telecinco | 1994-07-25 | | Televenta |
| Perdóname | Antena 3 | 1994-02-19 | María Teresa Campos | Reality show |
| Periódicos, Los | Telecinco | 1994-02-21 | Fernando Ónega | News |
| Preguntas y respuestas | La 2 | 1994-09-19 | Adelina Castillejo | Science/Culture |
| Prêt-a-porter | TVE-1 | 1994-06-24 | Paco Morán | Sitcom |
| ¡Qué guasa! | Telecinco | 1994-03-19 | Kike Supermix | Children |
| Quiéreme mucho | Antena 3 | 1994-07-25 | Irma Soriano | Quiz Show |
| Ring-Ring | TVE-1 | 1994-09-20 | | Children |
| ¡Sábado Fiesta! | TVE-1 | 1994-04-09 | | Children |
| Sandino | TVE-1 | 1994-12-22 | Kris Kristofferson | Telefilme |
| Scavengers | Antena 3 | 1994-10-01 | Bertín Osborne | Quiz Show |
| Secretos de familia | TVE-1 | 1994-05-27 | Ángeles Martín | Quiz Show |
| Señas de identidad | La 2 | 1994-04-20 | Concha García Campoy | Science/Culture |
| Siempre perdiendo | La 2 | 1994-04-26 | Faemino y Cansado | Comedy |
| Sinceramente tuyo | Antena 3 | 1994-11-14 | Jesús Puente | Reality show |
| Sólo goles | TVE-1 | 1994-09-19 | Matías Prats | Sport |
| Ta tocao | Antena 3 | 1994-05-27 | Belén Rueda | Quiz Show |
| Tardes con Teresa | TVE-1 | 1994-11-26 | María Teresa Campos | Variety Show |
| Tele vi que te vi | Telecinco | 1994-10-17 | Leticia Sabater | Children |
| Testigo directo | TVE-1 | 1994-09-21 | Ramón Pellicer | News |
| That's English | La 2 | 1994-10-13 | | Science/Culture |
| Tiempos difíciles | Antena 3 | 1994-01-23 | Manuel Campo Vidal | Talk Show |
| Una de tres | TVE-1 | 1994-09-24 | Luis Fernando Alvés | Quiz Show |
| Una pareja feliz | Telecinco | 1994-08-29 | Anne Igartiburu | Dating show |
| Ushuaia: Frontera Límite | La 2 | 1994-10-07 | Álvaro Bultó | Science/Culture |
| ¡Vaya tele! | TVE-1 | 1994-10-21 | Cruz y Raya | Comedy |
| Verde que te quiero verde | TVE-1 | 1994-10-10 | Javier de Artetxe Panera | Science/Culture |
| Veredicto | Telecinco | 1994-02-21 | Ana Rosa Quintana | Court Show |
| Vídeos, vídeos | Antena 3 | 1994-10-03 | Ximo Rovira | Vídeos |
| Villa Rosaura | TVE-1 | 1994-05-22 | Rosa María Sardà | Sitcom |
| Villarriba y Villabajo | TVE-1 | 1994-10-11 | Juanjo Puigcorbé | Sitcom |
| ¿Y quién es él? | TVE-1 | 1994-07-13 | Mari Pau Domínguez | Talk Show |

== Television shows ==
- La 1
  - Telediario (1957– )
  - Un, dos, tres... responda otra vez (1972–2004)
  - Estudio estadio (1972–2005)
  - Informe Semanal (1973– )
  - Parlamento (1978–2014)
  - Telepasión española (1990– )
  - No te rías, que es peor (1990–1995)
  - Club Disney (1990–1996)
  - Vídeos de primera (1990–1998)
  - Pasa la vida (1991–1996)
  - Quién sabe dónde (1992–1998)
  - El Menú de Karlos Arguiñano (1993–1995)
  - Valor y coraje (1993–1995)
  - ¿Qué apostamos? (1993–2000)
  - Corazón, Corazón (1993–2010)
- La 2
  - Al filo de lo imposble (1982– )
  - Pueblo de Dios (1982– )
  - Últimas preguntas (1983– )
  - En portada (1984– )
  - Estadio 2 (1984–2007)
  - Metrópolis (1985– )
  - Documentos TV (1986– )
  - Tendido cero (1986– )
  - Días de cine (1991– )
  - Clip, clap, video (1991–1995)
  - Cifras y Letras (1991–1996)
  - Línea 900 (1991–2007)
  - La Aventura del saber (1992– )
  - Jara y sedal (1992 -)
  - Tal cual (1992–1996)
  - Pinnic (1992–1998)
  - Bit a Bit (1993–1995)
  - Zona de juegos (1993–1995)
  - Lingo (1993–1996)
  - Zona ACB (1993–2010)
- Antena 3
  - Antena 3 Noticias (1990– )
  - Farmacia de guardia (1991–1995)
  - El gran juego de la oca (1993–1995)
  - Cita con la vida (1993–1996)
  - Hermida y Cía (1993–1996)
  - Los ladrones van a la oficina (1993–1996)
  - Lo que necesitas es amor (1993–1999)
  - Telemaratón (1993–2001)
- Telecinco
  - Informativos Telecinco (1990– )
  - Humor amarillo (1990–1995)
  - Su media naranja (1990–1996)
  - Telecupón (1990–1998)
  - Este país necesita un repaso (1993–1995)
  - La ruleta de la fortuna (1993–1997)
- Canal+
  - El día después (1990–2005)
  - Redacción (1990–2005)
  - Del 40 al 1 (1991–1998)

== Ending this year ==
- La 1
  - La Mujer de tu vida (1990–1994)
  - ¡Hola Raffaella! (1992–1994)
  - A las ocho con Raffaella (1993–1994)
  - Código uno (1993–1994)
  - Habitación 503 (1993–1994)
  - Noches de gala (1993–1994)
  - El Sábado cocino yo (1993–1994)
- La 2
  - El rescate del talismán (1991–1994)
  - ¿De parte de quién? (1993–1994)
  - El Peor programa de la semana (1993–1994)
- Antena 3
  - La Merienda (1990–1994)
  - Encantada de la vida (1993–1994)
  - Leña al mono que es de goma (1993–1994)
  - Todo va bien (1993–1994)
- Telecinco
  - Desayuna con alegría (1991–1994)
  - Vivan los novios (1991–1994)
  - Contacto con tacto (1992–1994)
  - La Batalla de las estrellas (1993–1994)
  - Las Mañanas de Tele 5 (1993–1994)
  - La Máquina de la verdad (1993–1994)
  - Mesa de redacción (1993–1994)
  - Misterios sin resolver (1993–1994)
  - ¿Se puede? (1993–1994)
  - Truhanes (1993–1994)

== Foreign series debuts in Spain ==
| English title | Spanish title | Original title | Channel | Country | Performers |
|---|---|---|---|---|---|
| Acapulco H.E.A.T. | Acapulco HEAT | | Telecinco | USA | Catherine Oxenberg |
| Aim for the Ace! | Raqueta de oro | Ace wo Nerae! | Telecinco | JAP | |
| Alejandra | Alejandra | Alejandra | La 1 | VEN | María Conchita Alonso |
| All Together Now | Mi viejo rockero | | Canal + | AUS | Jon English |
| Amazing Stories | Cuentos asombrosos | | La 2 | USA | |
| Animaniacs | Animaniacs | | Canal + | USA | |
| Are You Afraid of the Dark? | El club de medianoche | | Canal + | CAN USA | Ross Hull |
| Baby Talk | Mira quién habla | | FORTA | USA | Julia Duffy, George Clooney |
| Beakman's World | El mundo de Beakman | | FORTA | USA | Mark Ritts |
| Beavis and Butt-Head | Beavis y Butt-Head | | Canal + | USA | |
| Blossom | Blossom | | La 1 | USA | Mayim Bialik |
| Boogies Diner | Boogies | | Telecinco | USA | Jim J. Bullock |
| Burke's Law | La ley de Burke | | Antena 3 | USA | Gene Barry |
| Cadillacs and Dinosaurs | Cadillacs y dinosaurios | | Canal + | USA | |
| California Dreams | Sueños de California | | Antena 3 | USA | Kelly Packard |
| Civil Wars | Guerra de parejas | | La 1 | USA | Mariel Hemingway |
| Clarissa Explains It All | Las historias de Clarissa | | La 1 | USA | Melissa Joan Hart |
| Cobra | Cobra | | Telecinco | USA | Michael Dudikoff |
| COPS | COPS | | Antena 3 | USA CAN | |
| Wild Heart | Corazón salvaje | Corazón salvaje | La 1 | MEX | Edith González |
| Covington Cross | Covington cross | | Canal + | USA | Nigel Terry |
| Crossroads | Cruce de caminos | | La 2 | USA | Robert Urich |
| Dave's World | El mundo de Dave | | Canal + | USA | Harry Anderson |
| DEA | DEA | | La 1 | USA | Jenny Gago |
| --- | Déjate querer | | Telecinco | ARG | Catherine Fulop, Carlos Mata |
| Diagnosis: Murder | Diagnóstico Asesinato | | Antena 3 | USA | Dick Van Dyke |
| Dog City | Dog City | | Canal + | CAN USA | |
| Dr. Quinn, Medicine Woman | La doctora Quinn | | La 1 | USA | Jane Seymour |
| Duckman | Duckman | | Canal + | USA | |
| Eek! The Cat | Eek el gato | | Canal + | USA | |
| The Red Grasshopper | El Chapulín Colorado | El Chapulín Colorado | La 1 | MEX | Roberto Gómez Bolaños |
| Christy | Christy | | Antena 3 | USA | Kellie Martin |
| --- | El desprecio | | La 1 | VEN | Maricarmen Regueiro |
| --- | Emperatriz | | La 1 | VEN | Marina Baura |
| Fallen Angels | Ángeles caídos | | Canal + | USA | |
| Favorite Son | Mi hijo favorito | | Antena 3 | USA | Harry Hamlin |
| Fifteen | Los chicos de Hillside | | Telecinco | CAN | Laura Harris |
| G.B.H. | Tráfico de influencias | | Canal + | USA | Robert Lindsay |
| Glory Days | Días de gloria | | Telecinco | USA | Brad Pitt |
| Going to Extremes | Estudiantes en el Caribe | | La 1 | USA | Erika Alexander |
| Grace Under Fire | Grace al rojo vivo | | Telecinco | USA | Brett Butler |
| Hangin' with Mr. Cooper | Vivir con Mr. Cooper | | La 1 | USA | Mark Curry |
| Hearts Afire | Al senador ni caso | | Canal + | USA | John Ritter, Markie Post |
| Highlander: The Series | Los inmortales | | Telecinco | USA | Adrian Paul |
| Hyppo and Thomas | Tic, tac, toons | Kaba Totto | Canal + | JAP | |
| Idol Angel Yokoso Yoko | Yoko y saky | Aidoru Tenshi Yōkoso Yōko | Telecinco | JAP | |
| Jack's Place | Barra libre | | Canal + | USA | Hal Linden |
| James Bond Jr. | James Bond Jr. | | FORTA | USA | |
| King Arthur and the Knights of Justice | El Rey Arturo y los caballeros de la justicia | | Canal + | USA | |
| --- | La viuda roja | La Veuve rouge | La 2 | FRA | Françoise Fabian |
| Lightning Force | Comando especial | | Antena 3 | USA | Wings Hauser |
| Little Shop | La tienda de los horrores | | Canal + | USA | |
| M.A.S.K. | Mask | | FORTA | USA FRA | |
| Marielena | Marielena | | La 1 | USA | Lucía Méndez |
| Married... with Children | Matrimonio con hijos | | La 1 | USA | Ed O'Neill, Katey Sagal |
| Martin | Martin | | La 2 | USA | Martin Lawrence |
| Meatballs & Spaghetti | Albóndigas y Espagueti | | FORTA | USA | |
| Men Behaving Badly | Men Behaving Badly | | FORTA | UK | Martin Clunes |
| --- | Mi amada Beatriz | | Antena 3 | VEN | Catherine Fulop |
| --- | Milagros | Más allá del horizonte | Telecinco | ARG | Grecia Colmenares |
| --- | Misión Eureka | Das Sahara-Projekt | La 2 | GER | Helmut Berger |
| Nasty Boys | Chicos duros | | La 2 | USA | Don Franklin |
| Night Heat | Tensión en la noche | | La 1 | USA | Scott Hylands |
| NYPD Blue | Policías de Nueva York | | Telecinco | USA | David Caruso |
| Paradise Beach | Paradise Beach | | Antena 3 | USA | Melissa Bell |
| --- | Pasión de vivir | Pasión de vivir | Telecinco | PRI | Braulio Castillo Jr. |
| Power Rangers | Power Rangers | | Telecinco | USA | |
| Pygmalion | Pigmalión | Pigumario | FORTA | JAP | |
| Rachel Gunn, R.N. | Rachel Gunn, enfermera | | FORTA | USA | Christine Ebersole |
| Reasonable Doubts | Dudas razonables | | La 1 | USA | Mark Harmon |
| Renegade | Renegado | | La 1 | USA | Lorenzo Lamas |
| Rupert | El oso Rupert | | La 1 | CAN | |
| Seabert | Seabert | | FORTA | FRA | |
| --- | Serie rosa | Série rose | La 2 | FRA | Serge Avédikian |
| Shannon's Deal | El compromiso de Shannon | | La 2 | USA | Jamey Sheridan |
| Sherlock Hound | Sherlock Holmes | Meitantei Hōmuzu | FORTA | JAP | |
| Sledge Hammer! | El sorprendente Hammer | | La 2 | USA | David Rasche |
| Sylvanian Families | Las familias de Sylvania | | Canal + | USA | |
| Taz-Mania | Taz-Mania | | Canal + | USA | |
| The Adventures of Blinky Bill | Blinky Bill | | Canal + | AUS | |
| The Adventures of Pete & Pete | Las aventuras de Pete & Pete | | Canal + | USA | |
| The Fanelli Boys | Los Fanelli | | La 2 | USA | Joe Pantoliano |
| The Nanny | La niñera | | FORTA | USA | Fran Drescher |
| The Outsiders | Rebeldes | | La 2 | USA | Jay R. Ferguson |
| The Tomorrow People | Los chicos del mañana | | Canal + | UK | Kristian Schmid |
| The Torkelsons | La Familia Torkelson | | La 1 | USA | Connie Ray |
| They Came from Outer Space | Llegaron del espacio | | La 1 | USA | Dean Cameron |
| White Fang | Colmillo blanco | | Antena 3 | CAN NZL | Jaimz Woolvett |
| X-Men | Patrulla X | | Telecinco | USA CAN | |

== Births ==
- 22 February – Yaiza Esteve, actress.
- 25 February – Ricardo Gómez, actor.

== Deaths ==
- 9 March – Fernando Rey, actor, 76
- 4 September – Sonia Martínez, hostess, 30
- 19 September – Alberto Closas, actor, 72
- 23 September – Yale, journalist, 64
- 18 October – Conchita Montes, actress, 80
- 23 November – Félix Rotaeta, actor, 52
- 28 December – Mariano Medina, meteorólogo, 72

== See also ==
- List of Spanish films of 1994
