= Crimen de doble filo =

- Release date: 1965
- Running time: 90 minute
- Country: Spain
- Language: Spanish

Crimen de doble filo is a 1965 Spanish film. Directed by José Luis Borau.

== Cast ==
- Susana Campos as Laura
- Carlos Estrada as Andrés Salas
- José María Prada as Don Sixto
- Paul Eslheman as Claus Hans
- Alfonso Rojas as Antonio - el afinador
- José Marco as Inspector Vázquez
- Emilio Rodríguez as Julio Cuétar
- Héctor Quiroga as Músico de la orquesta
- Luis Marín
- Erasmo Pascual as Conserje del teatro Eslava
- Chiro Bermejo
- Antonio Casas as Comisario Ignacio Ruiz
- Ángel Chinarro
- Manuel Granada
- Manuel Guitián
- Esteban R. Hernández
- José María Labernié
- Cristina Marco
- Julián Marcos
- Sergio Mendizábal
- Paloma Pagés
- Elena Santonja
- Alfredo Ulecia
- Óscar Ulloa
- Pilar Vela
- Mariano Vidal Molina
- Rosa Zumárraga
