= Antonio Gasset =

Spanish journalist, television host, and movie critic (1946–2021)

- Born: Antonio Gasset Dubois; 19 May 1946; Madrid, Spain
- Died: September 29, 2021 (aged 75); Madrid, Spain
- Occupation(s): Journalist, TV Host

Antonio Gasset Dubois (19 May 1946 – 29 September 2021) was a Spanish journalist, television host and movie critic. He was best known for his work as director and television host of the TVE program Días de cine, having won the award for best educational program during the 2002 Iris Awards.

He was director of Los hábitos del incendiario 1970.

From the 1970s into the early-1980s, Antonio starred in several Spanish films.

In 1994 he became director of the program Días de cine, with Aitana Sánchez-Gijón as host. On 23 September 2003, once again as both director and host, he debuted the television show Off Cinema, which attempted to spread independent film to a broad audience.

His last broadcast as director of Dias de Cine was on 20 December 2007.
