= Sauerkraut (TV series) =

- Created by: Helme Heine
- Country of origin: Germany
- No. of seasons: 1
- No. of episodes: 13

Production
- Running time: 22 minutes

Sauerkraut is a German television series and a book

== Plot ==
The village Sauerkraut is the place, Sauerkraut was invented.

The characters are:

- Amadeo, a cock
- Amadea, a hen
- Bürgermeister Eberle, a pig, is the mayor
- Frau Eberle, his wife
- Dudu, a creature, near a sheep, the village underdog and main protagonist.
- Bossi, a crocodile, symbolizes the capitalist and the main antagonist
- Joey, dog, son of Bodo
- Nandi, a hen, girlfriend of Joey and daughter of Amadeo
- Fraulein Turtel, a turtle is the teacher
- Bodo, dog and sheriff
- Tante Emma, retailer — a mouse
- Spiritus, priest — a stork
- Professor Knödelmeyer, a goat, inventor and henchman of Bossi
- Frau Doktor, a fox, practitioner and doctor
- Anna, goose, waitress

All these figures are named according to the characters, they symbolize.

== Episodes ==
1. 900 years of Cabbage
2. Fishbone
3. Christmas
4. Concert
5. Burning
6. Friday of 13
7. Miracle Cure
8. Accident
9. Secret Recipe
10. Hollywood
11. Bell
12. Skull from Lake
13. The Will

== See also ==
- List of German television series
