= Elena Santonja =

Spanish television presenter and actress (1932–2016)

- Born: María Elena Santonja Esquivias; 29 May 1932; Madrid, Spain
- Died: 17 October 2016 (aged 84); Madrid, Spain
- Occupations: TV presenter, actress

María Elena Santonja Esquivias (29 May 1932 – 17 October 2016) was a Spanish TV presenter and occasional actress.

== Biography ==
She was the host of a number of shows in the early days of TVE, such as Entre nosotras (1958), but she reached fame as a host of the cooking show Con las manos en la masa, that lasted from 1984 to 1991. In this program she cooked food alongside many celebrities (a different one per episode), including Gonzalo Torrente Ballester, Rosa Chacel, Carlos Berlanga, Joaquín Sabina, Alaska...

She also made sporadic roles as actress in films such as El verdugo (1963) by Luis García Berlanga or Crimen de doble filo (1965) by José Luis Borau.

In 1956, she married film director and scriptwriter Jaime de Armiñán, with whom she had three children: Álvaro, Eduardo and Carmen.

She died on 17 October 2016 in Madrid at aged 84.

== Books ==
- Paso a paso por la cocina de Elena (Redacted by Elena Santonja, Álvaro Lión-Depetre and Carmen Beamonte de Cominges) (1987). Cookbook
- 24 setas de Madrid (Alongside Manuel Elexpuru) (1987)
- Diccionario de cocina (1997)
- Las recetas de mis amigos (1998). Cookbook
