= Canal 4 Navarra =

Former TV channel in Navarra, Spain

- Country: Spain
- Broadcast area: Navarre
- Headquarters: Pamplona

History
- Launched: 1997
- Closed: 2012

Links
- Website: www.canal4.es

Availability

Terrestrial
- Digital: Mux 62 (Navarre)

Canal 4 Navarra was a Spanish television channel, launched in 1997. It was founded and started to broadcast in 1997. Canal 4 Navarra mainly broadcast in Spanish but some programming was in Basque.

Canal 4 was closed on 29 February 2012, being substituted by the new Navarra Televisión.
