= Makinavaja (TV series) =

Spanish comedy TV series

- Genre: crime comedy
- Based on: Makinavaja comic strip by Ivà
- Directed by: Carlos Suárez Morilla; José Luis Cuerda
- Starring: Pepe Rubianes; Ricard Borrás; Mario Pardo; Pedro Reyes
- Country of origin: Spain
- Original language: Spanish
- No. of seasons: 3
- No. of episodes: 39

Production
- Camera setup: Multi-camera
- Running time: 25–30 minutes

Original release
- Network: La 2
- Release: January 17, 1995 – September 30, 1997

Makinavaja was a Spanish crime comedy TV series, adapting Ivà's comic strip of the same name, which aired 39 episodes between 1995 and 1997 on La 2. It was directed by Carlos Suárez Morilla in its first season and José Luis Cuerda on the second. The fiction follows the adventures of Makinavaja (Pepe Rubianes), a thief (chorizo).

== Cast ==
- Pepe Rubianes...Makinavaja.
- Ricard Borràs...Popeye.
- Mario Pardo...Mojamé.
- Pedro Reyes...El Pirata (1995).
- Llàtzer Escarceller...Matías.
- Florinda Chico...La Maru.
- Josep Adell...Comisario MediaOstia.
