= Con las manos en la masa =

Spanish cooking show

- Genre: Cooking show
- Directed by: Elena Santonja
- Presented by: Elena Santonja
- Theme music composer: Vainica Doble
- Opening theme: "Con las manos en la masa" by Gloria van Aerssen and Joaquín Sabina
- Country of origin: Spain
- Original language: Spanish
- No. of seasons: 7
- No. of episodes: 355

Production
- Running time: 30 min.
- Production company: Televisión Española

Original release
- Network: TVE-2
- Release: January 10, 1984 – May 1991

Con las manos en la masa is a Spanish cooking show by Televisión Española, directed and presented by Elena Santonja, aired between 1984 and 1991 on TVE-2. It is the first ever Spanish cooking show in the history of television.

== History ==
Although Televisión Española had already produced some shows talking about gastronomy and home economics, such as A mesa y mantel in 1958, Vamos a la mesa in 1967–68, Gastronomía in 1970 and the game show Ding-Dong in 1980, Con las manos en la masa was the first show actually preparing one or more dishes over the course of an episode, taking the viewing audience through the food's inspiration, preparation, and stages of cooking on Spanish television. The first episode aired on January 10, 1984 and the first dish cooked was a fried egg.

In each episode, Santonja welcomes and interviews a celebrity while the two explain and prepare two recipes in the kitchen on the studio, almost always related to traditional Spanish cuisine. Many celebrities from the entertainment industry, culture, sports, and even politics appear on the show.

In May 1991, the show was transformed into La cocina de Elena. In August, Televisión Española abruptly canceled the new show when Santonja refused to include product placement on it. Six episodes already recorded were not aired.
