= La casa de los líos =

Spanish television series (1996–2000)

La casa de los líos (in English, "The house of trouble") was a famous television show on TV channel A3 in Spain for four years, 1996 until 2000.

== Roles ==
The main roles were of Arturo Fernández as Arturo Valdés, the sister, Lola Herrera, as Pilar Valdés and the nurse Florinda Chico. It was a comedy about an elderly but seductive scrounger who moves to his sister's house to help her with her four young daughters.
