= Días de cine =

Spanish television series

- Genre: Film review
- Created by: César Abeytua
- Based on: Radio Days by Woody Allen
- Directed by: César Abeytua; Antonio Gasset; Raúl Alda; Gerardo Sánchez
- Presented by: César Abeytua; Antonio Gasset; Aitana Sánchez-Gijón; Cayetana Guillén Cuervo; Henar Álvarez; Elena S. Sánchez
- Country of origin: Spain
- Original language: Spanish
- No. of seasons: 29
- No. of episodes: 1261

Production
- Executive producer: Urbana Gil
- Producers: Fernando Menchero de los Ríos; Ángela Costilla Díez; Charo Leyva Velilla; María Belmonte Otero
- Running time: 60 min
- Production company: Televisión Española

Original release
- Network: La 2

Días de cine is a weekly Spanish film review television programme which has been broadcast on La 2 of Televisión Española since 9 October 1991.

The program was created by César Abeytua, inspired by the film by Woody Allen Radio Days. He remained as the program's director until 29 October 1994, when he was replaced by Aitana Sánchez-Gijón, who then was replaced by Antonio Gasset after hosting Informe Semanal. Gasset worked on the program both as host and as director until his retirement in 2007 when he was replaced by Cayetana Guillén Cuervo. as host, and by Gerardo Sánchez as director of the program, with co-director Raúl Alda serving along him until 2009. During the 2013–14 season, the program was hosted by Henar Álvarez. From September 2014 Elena S. Sánchez hosts the program.
