= La 2 (Spanish TV channel) =

Spanish free-to-air television channel

- Country: Spain
- Broadcast area: Spain and Andorra, reaching bordering regions via overspill of the Spanish terrestrial network
- Network: Televisión Española (TVE)
- Headquarters: Prado del Rey, Pozuelo de Alarcón (Madrid)

Programming
- Language: Spanish
- Picture format: 4K UHDTV HDR; 1080i HDTV

Ownership
- Owner: Radiotelevisión Española (RTVE)
- Sister channels: La 1 Clan; 24h Teledeporte; TVE Internacional; Star TVE

History
- Launched: 15 November 1966; 60 years ago
- Former names: TVE-UHF (1965–1966); Segunda Cadena (1966–1976); TVE 2 (1976–1991)

Links
- Website: La 2

Availability

Terrestrial
- Digital terrestrial television: Spain: Depends on each province Andorra: 45

Streaming media
- RTVE.es: Live

La 2 (Spanish pronunciation: [la ˈðos], The Two) is a Spanish free-to-air television channel owned and operated by Televisión Española (TVE), the television division of state-owned public broadcaster Radiotelevisión Española (RTVE). It is the corporation's second television channel, and is known for broadcasting cultural and public service programming, including documentaries, concerts, theatre and independent, Ibero-American and classic cinema.

It was launched on 15 November 1966 as the second regular television service in Spain right after TVE's first channel launched on 28 October 1956. As TVE held a monopoly on television broadcasting in the country, they were the only television channels until the first regional public television station was launched on 16 February 1983, when Euskal Telebista started broadcasting in the Basque Country. Commercial television was launched on 25 January 1990, when Antena 3 started broadcasting nationwide.

As it started broadcasting on UHF frequencies the channel was initially simply referred to as "UHF". It received other names, such as "Cadena II", "Segunda Cadena", "Segundo Programa" or "TVE2" until it adopted its current name "La 2" (La dos) during the 1990s. Its headquarters and main production center is Prado del Rey in Pozuelo de Alarcón with some programs produced in TVE's production center in San Cugat del Vallés. Although almost all its programming is in Spanish and is the same for all of Spain, TVE has territorial centers in every autonomous community and produces and broadcasts some local programming in regional variations in each of them in the corresponding co-official language.

== History ==
=== Creation of 'The second channel' ===
In the 1960s, the Spanish minister of Information and Tourism, Manuel Fraga Iribarne, decided that Televisión Española should start broadcasting a second television channel on the UHF band, following other European broadcasters that did the same. On 1 January 1965, TVE's second television service was launched in Madrid as a test broadcast, with programming limited to 4 hours at night that consisted of musical slots and re-airings of TV shows from Primera Cadena, mostly Telediario newscasts and Estudio 1.

Regular broadcasts started on 15 November 1966. TVE started producing original programming for the channel, mainly produced at the broadcaster's headquarters in Barcelona. UHF's first director was Salvador Pons Muñoz. In its first years, the channel could only be received in Madrid, Zaragoza and Barcelona, cities in which the UHF technology was implemented; it only aired at night and not all TV sets could tune in. Most TVs could not receive UHF broadcasts, so a UHF converter was needed.

As TVE's strategy evolved into turning the first channel into a generalist channel, niche programming was moved to UHF. Under the Salvador Pons administration, the second channel received artists from the country's Official Film School (Spanish: Escuela Oficial de Cine), such as Claudio Guerin, Pedro Olea or Antonio Mercero, people who would use the channel as a test zone to air alternative programming, such as documentaries or fiction shows. There was a high share of cultural programmes, like classical music blocks or theatre slots.

=== 1970s ===
During the '70s, the channel's programming was restricted to air at night (from 20:00 to 00:00), with an extension in the weekends. Coverage reached the main cities of Spain, but although TVE pointed out that only "three years" would pass before UHF could be tuned in all Spain, the second channel could not get it until 1982. For this reason it was not strange that successful programs on UHF passed to the first channel.

The UHF station continued to develop a minority programming, with a strong cultural emphasis, which did not compete directly with TVE-1. In addition to documentaries, theater broadcasts and dramas, the second channel also was at time broadcasting sports events and educational programming. At that time, the second channel was colloquially dubbed "el canalillo."

During the Spanish transition, the programming of the second channel received a small boost. In January 1976 debuted the program of debate La Clave (1976-1985), which addressed current issues from different points of view, something very complicated during the Francoism, preceded by a film related to the subject. Another important program was A fondo (In depth) (1976-1981), a talk show presented by Joaquín Soler Serrano which discussed with personalities from the artistic, literary and scientific fields of the time. On the other hand, the new artistic and musical trends were reflected in Encuentros con las artes y las letras (Encounters with the arts and the lyrics) (1976-1981) and Popgrama (1979-1981).

Another important aspect was the consolidation of the station's regional broadcasting centres, most importantly in Catalonia and the Canary Islands. TVE Cataluña started producing and broadcasting regional programming in opt-outs through the Circuit Català (Catalan circuit), while continuing to produce content for nationwide broadcasts. On the eve of the 1982 World Cup held in Spain, the Canary Islands regional broadcasting centre erected a new production office that, in addition to broadcasting the Second channel, allowed to develop dedicated programming for the archipelago.

=== 1980s ===
In 1983, the second channel was renamed "TVE-2" with a new corporate image. The schedule was not consolidated until the end of the decade.

In the mandates of José María Calviño and Pilar Miró, TVE-2 continued to be a cultural channel that accommodated spaces not appropriate for the first channel. In the midst of the Movida Madrileña phenomenon, it premiered La Edad de Oro (The Golden Age) (1983), directed and presented by Paloma Chamorro, that with time it turned into a cult classic. The 1980s also marked the premiere of emblematic programs such as the cultural magazine Metropoli (1985), the game show El tiempo es oro (Time is money) (1987) presented by Constantino Romero and Con las manos en la masa (Hands on the bat) (1984), directed and presented by Elena Santonja, considered the first cooking show in Spanish television history.

On the other hand, TVE-2 retained the broadcast of special events live, some of which exceeded in the audience the first channel: the European football competitions (UEFA Champions League, UEFA Cup and Cup Winners' Cup), the Spanish First Division in communities without autonomic television, the qualifying matches of the Spain national football team, and the Eurovision Song Contest from 1984 to 1992.

In 1984, it premiered Estadio 2, specializing in sports broadcasts, information, and a live results service during the weekends.

=== Creation of La 2 ===
The channel strategy of TVE changed with the emergence and sudden popularity of private television in 1989, with the first airing of Antena 3 and Tele 5 As of 1991, TVE-2 was renamed as La 2 and assumed a new alternative programming, whose spirit was included in the slogan «La 2, para una inmensa minoría» (La 2, for a huge minority). The following director of TVE, Ramón Colom, would redefine the concept towards a smaller target audience aged 30 years old.

In the 90s there was a significant increase in own programming, giving La 2 its personality. All documentaries, including Documentos TV, presented by Pedro Erquicia, were moved to that signal. In addition, TVE promoted an alternative newsletter to Telediario with the creation of La 2 Noticias, specialized in the news of human, social, and ecological interest in exchange for reducing the weight of the policy in the blocks. The new format was premiered on 7 November 1994 and thanks to it two journalists rose to fame: Lorenzo Milá (presenter) and Fran Llorente (news director).

In addition, La 2 issued US series with no place on La Primera: The Simpsons (until 1993), Northern Exposure, Married... with Children and Hangin' with Mr. Cooper. As for sports broadcasts, football was transferred to the first channel while the second was left with the rights of the Liga ACB of basketball, the Liga Asobal of handball and the LNFS. Although the channel's audience fell by private competition, these changes served to improve its reputation and turn it into an alternative to conventional programming. The strategy remained unchanged until 2004, with new programs that have been part of the backbone of La 2. In 1996 began the space of scientific disclosure Redes, directed by Eduard Punset, and in 1997 premiered Saber y ganar, presented by Jordi Hurtado, who became the longest-running game show in Spanish television. One year later was launched Versión española (Spanish version), Spanish film program presented by Cayetana Guillén Cuervo and that offered films without advertising breaks. Other important spaces were La noche temática (The thematic night) (documentary block of the pan-European channel Arte), the literary space Negro sobre blanco (Black on white), the informative Escuela del deporte (School of sport) and the containers of infantile programming, among them Con mucha marcha (With a lot of march), TPH Club, Hyakutake and Los Lunnis, the latter one of his greatest commercial successes.

=== Present day ===
In 2004, changes were made in the strategy of La 2: information services are remodeled because Fran Llorente, presenter of La 2 Noticias, is chosen news director of TVE, while Lorenzo Milá became the host of Telediario of La 1. The new direction redirects the offer to the young public, with the advance of primetime at 9:30 p.m., the gradual disappearance of regional programming (except for a few blocks in Catalonia and Canary Islands) and the entry of series American as Six Feet Under, Two and a Half Men, The OC or Gilmore Girls.

On 1 June 2010, the Board of Directors of RTVE made La 2 into a strictly cultural channel, positioning it as the reference for creativity and talent. From that same month, La 2 stopped broadcasting its sports programming (which moved to La 1 and Teledeporte) and infantile (which continued exclusively on Clan). Instead, it introduced cultural programming from the channel Cultural·es. In addition, an address was created for the channel, and its management was moved from Torrespaña to the center of TVE Cataluña in San Cugat del Vallés, Barcelona. Since 2014, primetime is covered by Spanish cinema cycles from Monday to Friday, and European films on weekends. The audience of La 2 has dropped to 2.6% audience share, similar to the children's channel Clan.

=== La 2 HD ===
On 7 September 2017, during the presentation of the new season of the channel, Televisión Española announced the launch of the high definition signal of La 2, which started issuing 31 October 2017 in Madrid, 7 November 2017 in the rest of Spain (except Catalonia and Canary Islands), 14 November 2017 in Catalonia and 21 November 2017 in Canary Islands. With standard-definition feed discontinued on 11 February 2024, it has only been available in HD ever since.

=== Upcoming Catalan regional version and new opt-outs ===
On 29 January 2025, a joint Junts-PSOE agreement paved way for La 2 to broadcast entirely in Catalan from 2027 in Catalonia. On 28 March 2025, the RTVE Administrative Council unanimously approved the creation of the new channel, named 2CAT, with Laura Folguera appointed as director. The move comes as part of RTVE's growing commitment towards regional languages to reflect "a plural Spain and multilingualism", with sister channel Clan seeing a 25% increase in Catalan-language content in local opt-outs.

On 1 April, the RTVE board announced that it would increase opt-outs for the channel, which as of the time of the decision, were limited to Madrid, Catalonia and the Canary Islands. For this end, talks with Cellnex regarding the feasibility of the project were held, aiming to increase it to the remaining autonomous communities. La 2, on a national scale, initiated a plan to potentiate its possibilities in order to give a "new impulse", claiming that its programming was largely disconnected from each other, as if it were "a big box full of little boxes". The network already premiered Malas lenguas in March, but plans a wider revamp in September, with the beginning of the new television season.

On 5 November 2026, La 2 will resume full broadcasts to Catalonia, coinciding with the full autonomy of La 2 Cat.

== Logo history ==
first logo; 1966 to 1976, 1983 to January 1991

1976 to 1983

January to September 1991

1991 to 2002

2002 to 2008

2000 to 2002

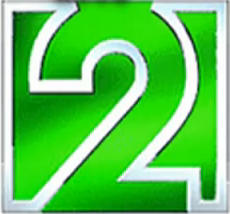
2003

December 2008 to January 2026

January 2026 to present
