= 1977 in Spanish television =

List of years in Spanish television
- … 1967; 1968; 1969; 1970; 1971; 1972; 1973; 1974; 1975; 1976; 1977; 1978; 1979; 1980; 1981; 1982; 1983; 1984; 1985; 1986; 1987 …
- Art; Archaeology; Architecture; Literature; Music; Philosophy; Science; +...

This is a list of Spanish television related events in 1977.

== Events ==
- 28 October: Due to a Royal Decree, RTVE becomes an Autonomous Agence.
- 19 November: Fernando Arias-Salgado is appointed Director General of RTVE.
- 19 November: Last episode of Japanese anime 3000 Leagues in Search of Mother is aired on La 1. Tha main character finds his mother.

== Debuts ==
Original Title	Channel	Debut	Performer / Hosts	Genre
24 imágenes por segundo	La 1	1977-10-26	Isabel Tenaille	Cultural
300 millones	La 2	1977-06-21	Jana Escribano	Variety Show
7 cantos de España	La 1	1977-10-06		Science/Culture
Andante	La 1	1977-03-09	Marisa Medina	Musical
Andar y charlar	La 1	1977-09-25		Science/Culture
Brújula	La 1	1977-10-11		Variety Show
Café-concierto	La 1	1977-10-02		Musical
Cantando se hace camino	La 1	1977-02-12	Antoñita Moreno	Musical
El monstruo de Sanchezstein	La 1	1977-04-27	María Luisa Seco	Children
El recreo	La 1	1977-09-14	Torrebruno	Children
Etcétera	La 1	1977-04-17	Jana Escribano	Cultural
Eva a las diez	La 1	1977-04-11		Variety Show
Éxitos TV	La 2	1977-10-12		Fiction
Grandes Relatos	La 1	1977-12-11		Fiction
Gente del sábado	La 1	1977-02-03	Tico Medina	News
Hablamos	La 1	1977-02-27	Marisol González	News
Hora 15	La 1	1977-10-12	Manuel Martín Ferrand	Cultural
Horizontes	La 2	1977-10-11	Ramón Sánchez Ocaña	Science/Culture
La abuela Cleta	La 1	1977-04-12		Children
La bolsa de los refranes	La 1	1977-02-19	Joaquín Calvo Sotelo	Science/Culture
La danza	La 2	1977-02-24	Ana Lázaro	Cultural
Las reglas del juego	La 1	1977-10-04	José Antonio Jáuregui	Science/Culture
Lengua viva	La 1	1977-08-04	Manuel Criado de Val	Science/Culture
Los escritores	La 1	1977-09-28	Lola Martínez	Science/Culture
Los ríos	La 2	1978-03-03		Documentary
Más menos	La 1	1977-07-01	Luis Ángel de la Viuda	Talk Show
Mi no comprender	La 1	1977-04-27	Alfredo Amestoy	News
Mujeres insólitas	La 1	1977-02-01		Drama series
Mundo noche	La 1	1978-06-20	Miguel de los Santos	Documentary
Musiqueando	La 1	1977-04-27	Eva Gloria	Music
Pianísimo	La 1	1977-01-08		Music
Pintores en el tiempo	La 1	1977-10-12		Cultural
Popgrama	La 2	1977-09-07	Carlos Tena	Music
Seis canciones	La 1	1977-07-05		Music
Teatro Estudio	La 2	1977-09-28		Theatre
Tierras viejas, voces nuevas	La 1	1977-10-25	José Luis Rodríguez Puértolas	News
Trazos	La 2	1977-04-20	Paloma Chamorro	Cultural
TV en el recuerdo	La 1	1977-01-09		Variety Show
Las viudas	La 1	1977-03-29	Lola Herrera	Drama series
Yo canto	La 1	1977-09-28		Music

== Television shows ==
=== La 1 ===
- Telediario (1957– )
- Novela (1962–1979)
- Estudio 1 (1965–1981)
- Teatro breve (1966–1981)
- Revista de toros (1971–1983)
- Un, dos, tres... responda otra vez (1972–2004)
- Estudio estadio (1972–2005)
- Informe Semanal (1973– )
- El Mundo en acción (1973–1978)
- El gran circo de TVE (1973–1983)
- La Semana (1974–1978)
- Un Globo, dos globos, tres globos (1974–1979)
- El hombre y la Tierra (1974–1980)
- Siete días (1974–1981)
- El Mundo de la música (1975–1980)
- Curro Jiménez (1976–1978)
- Última hora (1976–1978)
- 625 Lineas (1976–1981)
- Gente hoy (1976–1981)
- Gente joven (1976–1987)

=== La 2 ===
- Torneo (1967–1979)
- Ficciones (1971–1981)
- Polideportivo (1973–1981)
- Revista de cine (1974–1981)
- Teatro Club (1976–1978)
- Redacción noche (1976–1979)
- A fondo (1976–1981)
- Encuentros con las letras (1976–1981)
- Más allá (1976–1981)
- La Clave (1976–1983)

== Ending this year ==
=== La 1 ===
- Los Libros (1974–1977)
- La Guagua (1975–1977)
- Vivir para ver (1975–1977)
- Con otro acento (1976–1977)
- Paisaje con figuras (1976–1977)
- Sábado cine (1976–1977)
- La saga de los Rius (1976–1977)
- La Señora García se confiesa (1976–1977)

=== La 2 ===
- Original (1974–1977)

== Foreign series debuts in Spain ==
English title	Spanish title	Original title	Channel	Country	Performers
3000 Leagues in Search of Mother	Marco, de los Apeninos a los Andes	Haha o Tazunete Sanzenri	La 1	JAP	
Alexander Two	Alexander II	Alexander Zwo	La 2	GER	Jean-Claude Bouillon
Apple's Way	La Familia Apple		La 2	USA	Ronny Cox, Frances Lee McCain
Barbary Coast	Costa Barbara		La 1	USA	William Shatner, Doug McClure
Captains and the Kings	Capitanes y reyes		La 1	USA	Richard Jordan
Dog of Flanders	El perro de Flandes	Furandāsu no Inu	La 1	JAP	
Emil of Lönneberga	Miguel el Travieso	Emil i Lönneberga	La 1	SWEGER	Jan Ohlsson
Harry O	Harry O		La 1	USA	David Janssen
–	El Marsellés	Il marsigliese	La 1	ITA	Marc Porel
Kate McShane	Kate McShane		La 1	USA	Anne Meara
–	La baronesa Carini	L'amaro caso della baronessa di Carini	La 1	ITA	Ugo Pagliai
Lucas Tanner	Lucas Tanner		La 1	USA	David Hartman
Matt Helm	Matt Helm		La 1	USA	Anthony Franciosa
Medical Story	Historias médicas		La 1	USA	Ralph Bellamy
Planet of the Apes	El planeta de los simios		La 1	USA	Roddy McDowall
Quincy, M.E.	Quincy		La 1	USA	Jack Klugman
Rich Man, Poor Man	Hombre rico, hombre pobre		La 1	USA	Peter Strauss, Nick Nolte
Sara	Sara		La 1	USA	Brenda Vaccaro
Seventh Avenue	Séptima Avenida		La 1	USA	Steven Keats, Jane Seymour
Special Branch	Brigada especial		La 2	UK	Derren Nesbitt
Spencer's Pilots	Los pilotos de Spencer		La 1	USA	Gene Evans
Starsky & Hutch	Starsky y Hutch		La 1	USA	David Soul, Paul Michael Glaser
The Clayhanger Family	La saga de los Clayhanger		La 1	UK	Janet Suzman
The Delphi Bureau	La oficina Delphi		La 1	USA	Laurence Luckinbill
The Undersea World of Jacques Cousteau	Mundo submarino	L'Odyssée sous-marine de l'équipe Cousteau	La 1	FRA	Jacques Cousteau
Thriller	Tensión		La 1	UK	
–	Se busca compañero	Partner gesucht	La 1	GER	Veronika Fitz
–	Una ciudad al final del camino	Una città in fondo alla strada	La 1	ITA	Massimo Ranieri

== Births ==
- 6 January – Quequé, comedian.
- 22 January – Lluís Guilera, host.
- 26 January – Luján Argüelles, hostess.
- 27 January – Jesús Cintora, journalist
- 2 February – Antonio Pagudo, actor.
- 11 February – Ion Aramendi, journalist.
- 19 February – Dani Martín, actor.
- 16 March – Mónica Cruz, actress.
- 21 March – Raúl Peña, actor.
- 29 April – Rocío Carrasco, hostess.
- 7 May – Lara Siscar, hostess.
- 10 May – Hugo Silva, actor.
- 11 May –
  - Daniel Muriel, actor.
  - Quique Jiménez, pundit.
- 3 June – Beatriz Montañez, hostess.
- 16 June – Josep Lobató, host.
- 19 June – Usun Yoon, hostess.
- 27 June – Manuel Feijóo, actor and writer.
- 1 July – Verónica Sánchez, actress.
- 4 July – Martín Barreiro, meteorolgist.
- 5 July – Cristina Pardo, journalist.
- 27 July – Cristina Peña, actress and hostess.
- 7 August – Paula Echevarría, actress.
- 5 September – Félix Gómez, actor.
- 26 September – Sonia Ferrer, hostess.
- 5 October – Ángel Martín, actor and host.
- 30 November – Sonsoles Ónega, hostess.
- 9 December – Ana Pastor, hostess.
- 12 December – Diana Palazón, actress.
- 16 December – Sergio Martín Herrera, journalist.
- 20 December – Aure Sánchez, actor.
- 31 December – Marta Hazas, actress.
- Pilar Galán, hostess.

== Deaths ==
- 27 March – Romano Villalba, director, 46.

== See also ==
- 1977 in Spain
- List of Spanish films of 1977
