= 1976 in Spanish television =

This is a list of Spanish television related events in 1976.

== Events ==
- 19 March: Second season of Un, dos, tres... responda otra vez, debuts on La 1, with a cast including among others Victoria Abril and María Casal.
- 22 May: Last episode of anime Heidi airs on TVE; it is the first Japanese anime broadcast in Spain.
- 22 June: Clown Fofó's death shocks Spain.
- 23 July: Rafael Anson is appointed Director General of RTVE.
- 30 October: María Ostiz, representing Spain wins the OTI Festival 1976 with the song "Canta cigarra".

== Debuts ==
| Original Title | Channel | Debut | Performer / Hosts Intérpretación | Genre |
|---|---|---|---|---|
| 625 Lineas | La 1 | 1976-11-18 | José Antonio Plaza | Variety Show |
| A fondo | La 2 | 1976-01-16 | Joaquín Soler Serrano | Talk show |
| Las aventuras del Hada Rebeca | La 1 | 1976-02-05 | Conchita Goyanes | Children |
| La clave | La 2 | 1976-01-18 | José Luis Balbín | Talk Show |
| Con otro acento | La 1 | 1976-08-11 | Miguel de los Santos | Variety Show |
| Cortísimo | La 1 | 1976-12-04 | Enrique Martí Maqueda | Variety Show |
| Cuarto y mitad | La 1 | 1976-03-07 | Isabel Bauzá | News |
| Curro Jiménez | La 1 | 1976-12-22 | Sancho Gracia | Drama series |
| Encuentros con las artes y las letras | La 2 | 1976-05-07 | Roberto Llamas | Science/Culture |
| Escuela de salud | La 1 | 1976-03-13 | Manuel Torreiglesias | Science/Culture |
| España hoy | La 2 | 1976-11-16 | José Javaloyes | Talk Show |
| Esta noche...fiesta | La 1 | 1976-11-02 | José María Íñigo | Variety Show |
| Éxitos de TVE | La 1 | 1976-11-12 | | Variety Show |
| Gente hoy | La 1 | 1976-09-06 | Isabel Tenaille | Variety Show |
| Hoy por hoy | La 1 | 1976-04-30 | Tico Medina | News |
| Informe especial | La 1 | 1976-12-10 | | News |
| La llamada de las profundidades | La 2 | 1976-07-03 | Eduardo Admetlla | Documentary |
| Un lugar en Europa | La 2 | 1976-08-21 | | Documentary |
| Maestros y estilos | La 2 | 1976-01-08 | Fernando Pieri | Music |
| Más allá | La 2 | 1976-01-15 | Fernando Jiménez del Oso | Mistery |
| Micro-Música | La 1 | 1976-12-14 | | Music |
| Música y estrellas | La 1 | 1976-07-03 | Marujita Díaz | Variety Show |
| Los niños no sois tan niños | La 1 | 1976-11-29 | Dr. Rosado | Children |
| La Odisea | La 1 | 1976-03-05 | Els Joglars | Children |
| Opinión pública | La 1 | 1976-11-07 | Ramón Pradera | News |
| Página del lunes | La 2 | 1976-01-18 | José Luis Rodríguez Puértolas | Science/Culture |
| Paisaje con figuras | La 1 | 1976-02-11 | Antonio Gala | Drama series |
| Palmarés | La 1 | 1976-07-03 | Bárbara Rey | Variety Show |
| Panorama musical | La 2 | 1976-11-06 | Luciano González | Music |
| ¿Qué es? | La 1 | 1976-11-02 | Francisco Bermeosolo | Science/Culture |
| ¿Quién es? | La 1 | 1976-11-12 | Manuel Calvo Hernando | Science/Culture |
| Redacción de noche | La 2 | 1976-03-12 | José Antonio Silva | News |
| Revista de prensa | La 1 | 1976-10-01 | | News |
| RTVE es noticia | La 1 | 1976-10-03 | | News |
| Sábado cine | La 1 | 1976-10-30 | Manuel Martín Ferrand | Movies |
| La saga de los Rius | La 1 | 1976-11-01 | Fernando Guillén | Drama series |
| La señora García se confiesa | La 1 | 1976-11-02 | Adolfo Marsillach | Drama series |
| Teatro Club | La 2 | 1976-01-24 | | Theatre |
| Última hora | La 1 | 1976-04-08 | Pedro Macía | News |

== Television shows ==
=== La 1 ===
- Telediario (1957– )
- Novela (1962–1979)
- Estudio 1 (1965–1981)
- Teatro breve (1966–1981)
- Revista de toros (1971–1983)
- Un, dos, tres... responda otra vez (1972–2004)
- Estudio estadio (1972–2005)
- Informe Semanal (1973– )
- El Mundo en acción (1973–1978)
- El gran circo de TVE (1973–1983)
- Los Libros (1974–1977)
- La Semana (1974–1978)
- Un Globo, dos globos, tres globos (1974–1979)
- El hombre y la Tierra (1974–1980)
- Siete días (1974–1981)
- La Guagua (1975–1977)
- Vivir para ver (1975–1977)
- El mundo de la música (1975–1980)

=== La 2 ===
- Torneo (1967–1979)
- Ficciones (1971–1981)
- Polideportivo (1973–1981)
- Original (1974–1977)
- Revista de cine (1974–1981)

== Ending this year ==
=== La 1 ===
- The Chiripitiflauticos (1966–1976)
- Cuentos y leyendas (1968–1976)
- Cantar y reír (1974–1976)
- Cuentopos (1974–1976)
- Los Reporteros (1974–1976)
- Aquí y ahora (1975–1976)
- El Campo (1975–1976)
- Canciones del desván (1975–1976)
- Directísimo (1975–1976)
- Este señor de negro (1975–1976)
- La Hora de... (1975–1976)
- El Mundo de la televisión (1975–1976)
- Página del domingo (1975–1976)
- Revistero (1975–1976)
- Voces a 45 (1975–1976)

=== La 2 ===
- Musical pop (1974–1976)

== Foreign series debuts in Spain ==
| English title | Spanish title | Original title | Channel | Country | Performers |
|---|---|---|---|---|---|
| Arthur of the Britons | Arturo de Bretaña | | La 1 | UK | Oliver Tobias |
| Born Free | Nacida libre | | La 1 | USA | Gary Collins, Diana Muldaur |
| Elizabeth R | Elizabeth R | | La 1 | UK | Glenda Jackson |
| Father, Dear Father | Papá, querido papá | | La 1 | UK | Patrick Cargill |
| Get Christie Love! | Busquen a Christie Love | | La 1 | USA | Teresa Graves |
| Hec Ramsey | Hec Ramsey | | La 1 | USA | Richard Boone |
| Henry VIII and His Six Wives | Las seis esposas de Enrique VIII | | La 1 | UK | Keith Michell |
| – | El callejón de Lucrecia Borgia | Il viccolo di madama Lucrezia | La 1 | FRA | Bernard Malaterre |
| Jane Eyre | Jane Eyre | | La 1 | UK | Sorcha Cusack |
| Kodiak | Kodiak | | La 1 | USA | Clint Walker |
| – | La isla misteriosa y el capitán Nemo | L'Île mystérieuse | La 1 | FRA | Omar Sharif |
| Occasional Wife | Un soltero casado | | La 2 | USA | Michael Callan |
| -- | Las buenas apariencias | Pot-Bouille | La 1 | FRA | Marie-France Pisier |
| S.W.A.T. | Los hombres de Harrelson | | La 1 | USA | Steve Forrest, Robert Urich |
| Sandokan | Sandokán | Sandokan | La 1 | ITA | Kabir Bedi |
| Sesame Street | Ábrete Sésamo | | La 1 | USA | |
| Shaft | Shaft | | La 1 | USA | Richard Roundtree |
| Space: 1999 | Espacio: 1999 | | La 1 | UK | Martin Landau, Barbara Bain |
| -- | Al filo de la memoria | Sul filo della memoria | La 1 | ITA | Renzo Palmer |
| Temperatures Rising | Alta temperatura | | La 2 | USA | James Whitmore |
| The Blue Knight | El caballero de azul | | La 1 | USA | George Kennedy |
| The Life of Leonardo da Vinci | Leonardo da Vinci | La Vita di Leonardo Da Vinci | La 1 | ITA | Philippe Leroy |
| The Magician | El mago | | La 1 | USA | Bill Bixby |
| The Police Inspector | El comisario | Der Kommissar | La 2 | GER | Erik Ode |
| The Rookies | Los patrulleros | | La 1 | USA | Michael Ontkean, Sam Melville, Georg Stanford Brown |
| The Sweeney | 24 horas al día | | La 1 | UK | John Thaw |
| The Texas Wheelers | Cosas de chicos | | La 1 | USA | Jack Elam, Gary Busey, Mark Hamill |
| Three for the Road | Tres en la carretera | | La 1 | USA | Alex Rocco, Vincent Van Patten, Leif Garrett |
| – | Historias del año 1000 | Tre nel mille | La 1 | ITA | Giancarlo Dettori |

== Births ==
- 2 January – Paz Vega, actress.
- 15 January – Mamen Mendizábal, hostess.
- 17 February – Daniel Grao, actor.
- 24 February – Cristina Villanueva, hostess.
- 12 March – María Adánez, actress.
- 17 March – Luis Rollán, pundit.
- 18 March – Laura Manzanedo, actress.
- 9 May – Gema Balbás, hostess.
- 11 May – Daniel Muriel, actor.
- 1 June – Óscar Martínez, host.
- 18 June – Irene Montalà, actress.
- 18 July – Elsa Pataky, actress.
- 26 July – Ana Roldán, journalist.
- 29 July – Fernando González Gonzo, host.
- 6 August –
  - Raquel Carrillo, hostess.
  - Javier Estrada, host.
- 8 August – Jacob Petrus, host
- 18 August – Nani Gaitán, hostess.
- 26 August – Kiko Hernández, pundit.
- 4 September – Iván Massagué, actor.
- 13 September – Alejandro Tous, actor.
- 16 September – Mónica Carrillo, hostess.
- 14 October – Jordi Cruz, host.
- 17 October – Desirée Ndjambo, hostess.
- 16 November – Estíbaliz Gabilondo, hostess.
- 24 November – Julio Somoano, host.
- 30 November – Miryam Gallego, actress.
- 1 December – Pablo Chiapella, actor.
- Marc Sala, host.

== Deaths ==
- 10 April – Venancio Muro, actor, 47.
- 22 June – Fofó, clown, 53.
- 17 August – Valentín Tornos, actor, 75.

== See also ==
- 1976 in Spain
- List of Spanish films of 1976
