= 1979 in Spanish television =

This is a list of Spanish television related events in 1979.

== Events ==
- 31 March: Betty Missiego performing the song Su canción represents Spain at the Eurovision Song Contest 1979, that took place in Jerusalem, ranking 2nd.

== Debuts ==
| Original Title | Channel | Debut | Performer / Hosts | Genre |
|---|---|---|---|---|
| 003 y medio | La 1 | 1979-09-10 | Torrebruno | Children |
| Antología de la Zarzuela | La 1 | 1979-11-28 | Fernando García de la Vega | Music |
| La barraca | La 1 | 1979-10-09 | Álvaro de Luna | Drama series |
| Barrio Sésamo/3-2-1 Contact | La 1 | 1979-12-23 | Emma Cohen | Children |
| Café de redacción | La 1 | 1979-01-17 | Luis Losada | Talk Show |
| Canciones de una vida | La 1 | 1979-09-24 | José Luis Barcelona | Music |
| El coleccionismo y los coleccionistas | La 2 | 1979-02-11 | Carmen Maura | Science/Culture |
| Don Quijote de La Mancha | La 1 | 1979-10-06 | | Cartoon |
| Los episodios | La 1 | 1979-02-14 | Francisco Merino | Children |
| Escrito en América | La 1 | 1979-06-03 | Susana Mara | Drama series |
| Gaceta cultural | La 1 | 1979-10-10 | Julio César Fernández | Science/Culture |
| La locomotora | La 1 | 1979-07-23 | Torrebruno | Children |
| La mansión de los Plaff | La 1 | 1979-05-24 | María Fernanda D'Ocón | Children |
| Más vale prevenir | La 1 | 1979-07-06 | Ramón Sánchez Ocaña | Science/Culture |
| Un mito llamado | La 1 | 1979-01-04 | Nuria Torray | Drama series |
| Un mundo para ellos | La 1 | 1979-06-11 | Santiago Vázquez | Science/Culture |
| Perfiles | La 1 | 1979-02-08 | Joaquín Soler Serrano | Talk Show |
| Primera página | La 1 | 1979-01-30 | | News |
| Que usted lo mate bien | La 1 | 1979-02-06 | | Sitcom |
| Retrato en vivo | La 2 | 1979-10-20 | Miguel de los Santos | Talk Show |
| El señor Villanueva y su gente | La 1 | 1979-08-16 | Ismael Merlo | Sitcom |
| Tribuna Internacional | La 2 | 1979-04-29 | Jesús Hermida | News |
| La verdad de... | La 1 | 1979-05-29 | Alfredo Amestoy | Talk Show |

== Television shows ==
=== La 1 ===
- Telediario (1957- )
- Estudio 1 (1965–1981)
- Teatro breve (1966-1981)
- Revista de toros (1971-1983)
- Estudio estadio (1972-2005)
- Informe Semanal (1973- )
- El gran circo de TVE (1973-1983)
- El hombre y la Tierra (1974-1980)
- Siete días (1974-1981)
- El Mundo de la música (1975-1980)
- 625 Lineas (1976-1981)
- Gente hoy (1976-1981)
- Gente joven (1976-1987)
- Hablamos (1977-1982)
- 300 millones (1977-1983)
- Fantástico (1978-1980 )
- El Canto de un duro (1978-1981)
- Parlamento (1978-1982; 1989-2014)
- Aplauso (1978-1983)
- Vivir cada día (1978-1988)

=== La 2 ===
- Ficciones (1971-1981)
- Polideportivo (1973-1981)
- Revista de cine (1974-1981)
- A Fondo (1976-1981)
- Encuentros con las letras (1976-1981)
- Más allá (1976-1981)
- La Clave (1976-1983)
- Horizontes (1977-1981)
- Popgrama (1977-1981)
- Teatro estudio (1977-1981)
- Imágenes (1978-1981)
- Opinión pública (1978-1981)

== Ending this year ==
=== La 1 ===
- Novela (1962-1979)
- Un Globo, dos globos, tres globos (1974-1979)
- Hora 15 (1977-1979)
- El Recreo (1977-1979)
- Los Espectáculos (1978-1979)
- El Hotel de las mil y una estrellas (1978-1979)
- El Juglar y la reina (1978-1979)
- La Segunda oportunidad (1978-1979)
- Sumarísimo (1978-1979)
- Tiempo libre (1978-1979)

=== La 2 ===
- Torneo (1967-1979)
- Redacción noche (1976-1979)

== Foreign series debuts in Spain ==
| English title | Spanish title | Original title | Country | Performers |
|---|---|---|---|---|
| Anna Karenina | Ana Karenina | | UK | Nicola Pagett |
| Bannertail: The Story of Gray Squirrel | Banner y Flapy | Shīton Dōbutsuki Risu no Banā | JAP | |
| Barbapapa | Barbapapá | Barbapapa | FRA | |
| Children of the Stones | Los chicos de Stone | | UK | Iain Cuthbertson |
| Dallas | Dallas | | USA | L. Hagman, P. Duffy, V. Principal, L. Gray |
| Dick Turpin | Dick Turpin | | UK | Richard O'Sullivan |
| Eight Is Enough | Con ocho basta | | USA | Dick Van Patten |
| Family | Familia | | USA | James Broderick, Sada Thompson |
| Flying High | Azafatas en el aire | | USA | Connie Selleca |
| George and Mildred | Los Roper | | UK | Yootha Joyce, Brian Murphy |
| Gibbsville | Gibbsville | | USA | John Savage |
| Holocaust | Holocausto | | USA | Meryl Streep, Joseph Bottoms |
| Laverne & Shirley | Laverne y Shirley | | USA | Cindy Williams, Penny Marshall |
| Little Women | Mujercitas | | USA | Meredith Baxter, Susan Dey, Eve Plumb |
| Moses the Lawgiver | Moisés | | USA | Burt Lancaster |
| Nakia | Nakia | | USA | Robert Forster |
| Once Upon a Time... Man | Érase una vez... el hombre | Il était une fois... l'homme | FRA | |
| Poldark | Poldark | | UK | Robin Ellis, Angharad Rees |
| Project U.F.O. | Investigación OVNI | | USA | William Caskey Swaim, William Jordan |
| Return of the Saint | El regreso del Santo | | USA | Ian Ogilvy |
| Robin's Nest | El nido de Robin | | UK | Richard O'Sullivan |
| Roots | Raíces | | USA | LeVar Burton |
| Studs Lonigan | Studs Lonigan | | USA | Harry Hamlin |
| Tarzan, Lord of the Jungle | Tarzán | | USA | |
| Testimony of Two Men | Testimonio de dos hombres | | USA | David Birney, Barbara Parkins, Linda Purl |
| The Amazing Howard Hughes | El asombroso mundo de Hodward Hughes | | USA | Tommy Lee Jones |
| The Famous Five | Los Cinco | | UK | Gary Russell, Jennifer Thanisch |
| The Feather and Father Gang | Palo y astilla | | USA | Stefanie Powers, Harold Gould |
| The Foundation | La fundación | | UK | Lynette Davies |
| The Prime of Miss Jean Brodie | Los mejores años de Miss Brodie | | UK | Geraldine McEwan |
| The Rockford Files | Los casos de Rockford | | USA | James Garner |
| Toma | Astucia peligrosa | | USA | Tony Musante |
| Women in White | Mujeres de blanco | | USA | Susan Flannery |

== Births ==
- 1 January - Gisela, singer.
- 2 January - Alfonso Merlos, host.
- 30 January - Carlos Latre, comedian.
- 17 March - Pilar Rubio, hostess.
- 20 March - Silvia Abascal, actress.
- 27 March - Susana Guasch, hostess.
- 5 April - Cristina Urgel, actress.
- 7 April - Ruth Núñez, actress.
- 18 April - Nuria Fergó, singer and actress.
- 20 April - Quique Peinado, comedian.
- 18 May - Iago García - actor.
- 29 May - Elena Sánchez, hostess.
- 5 June - David Bisbal, Singer.
- 28 June - Roberto Leal, host.
- 29 June - Alejo Sauras, actor.
- 30 June - Raquel Martínez, journalist and hostess.
- 3 July - Berta Collado, hostess.
- 23 July - Dani Mateo, host and actor.
- 29 July - Sandra Sabatés, hostess.
- 10 September - Darío Sánchez Paso, actor.
- 5 October - Patricia Conde, hostess.
- 24 October - Silvia Intxaurrondo, hostess
- 8 November - Ana Morgade, hostess
- 8 December - Manu Guix, composer
- 11 July - Marina Gatell - actress.

== Deaths ==
- 5 June - Gustavo Re, host, 70.
- 12 September - Laly Soldevila, actress, 46.

== See also ==
- List of Spanish films of 1979
