= 1967 in Spanish television =

This is a list of Spanish television related events from 1967.

== Events ==
- 6 October: Popular TV Sitcom La casa de los Martínez debut on TVE.
- 13 November: Official Inauguration of Escuela de Radio y Televisión (School of Radio and Television).

== Debuts ==
Original title	Channel	Debut	Performers / hosts	Genre
A vista de pájaro	La 2	1967-06-03		Science
Algo más que un hombre	La 2	1967-10-27		Science
Angelino Pastor	TVE 1	1967-01-15	Juanjo Menéndez	Sitcom
Caminos y canciones	TVE 1	1967-01-31	Jesús Álvarez	Music
Campo y ciudad	TVE 1	1967-05-31		Science
Canciones de la mar	TVE 1	1967-08-06	Enrique Rubio	Music
La carretera es de todos	TVE 1	1967-10-04	Enrique Rubio	Science
La casa de los Martínez	TVE 1	1967-10-06	Julia Martínez	Sitcom
Cite a las siete	La 2	1967-04-15	Joaquín Soler Serrano	Quiz show
Concurso permanente de guiones	TVE 1	1967-08-05		Quiz show
Crónica 2	La 2	1967-11-25		Science
Cuestión urgente	La 2	1967-10-17	Esteban Durán	News
Las doce caras de Juan	TVE 1	1967-10-07	Alberto Closas	Sitcom
Doce cuentos y una pesadilla	La 2	1967-07-08		Drama Series
En órbita	TVE 1	1967-10-21	Tony Leblanc	Comedy
¿Es usted el asesino?	TVE 1	1967-08-13	Narciso Ibáñez Menta	Drama Series
Escuela de matrimonios	TVE 1	1967-03-31	Elvira Quintillá	Sitcom
La familia Colón	TVE 1	1967-01-13	Susana Canales	Drama Series
Flash	La 2	1967-10-19	Félix Martialay	Culture
Habla contigo Jesús Urteaga	TVE 1	1967-10-30	Jesús Urteaga	Religion
Historias de hoy	TVE 1	1967-01-13		Drama Series
Historias naturales	TVE 1	1967-10-04	Álvaro de Laiglesia	Drama Series
El hombre, ese desconocido	La 2	1967-10-22		Science
Imagen club	TVE 1	1967-10-28	Miguel Ángel Romano	Variety Show
Imágenes para el descanso	TVE 1	1967-07-18	Ricardo Arias	Children
Libros que hay que tener	La 2	1967-04-20	Francisco García Pavón	Science
Luna llena	TVE 1	1967-07-02	Víctor Vadorrey	Drama Series
El mar, ese mundo maravilloso	TVE 1	1967-05-05	Mario Beut	Science
El mundo mañana	La 2	1967-05-12		Science
Nada nuevo bajo el sol	TVE 1	1967-04-13	Pilar Ulía	Science
Nocturno del domingo	TVE 1	1967-04-29	Francisco Javier Martín Abril	Science
Ópera	La 2	1967-10-19		Music
La otra música	TVE 1	1967-10-04	José María Sánchez Silva	Sitcom
Panorámica	TVE 1	1967-11-22		Documentary
Pasiones en conflicto	La 2	1967-04-13		Drama Series
Pequeña Cátedra	TVE 1	1967-04-16	Roberto Saumells	Science
Poesía e imagen	TVE 1	1967-11-29	Alberto González Vergel	Drama Series
Puntos del globo	TVE 1	1967-02-02		Documentary
Una pregunta en la calle	TVE 1	1967-04-08	Ángel Losada	News
La segunda cadena informa	La 2	1967-10-19	Rosa María Mateo	News
Sobre ruedas	TVE 1	1967-06-16	Manuel Ripoll	Science
Tenemos la palabra	TVE 1	1967-10-21	Gabriel Ibáñez	Children
Tiempo para creer	La 2	1967-10-25	Ángel García Dorronsoro	Religion
Todos somos jóvenes	TVE 1	1967-10-21	Patricia Nigel	Children
Torneo	La 2	1967-04-14		Sport
Tribuna TV	TVE 1	1967-01-08	Victoriano Fernández de Asís	Talking Show
Vamos a la mesa	TVE 1	1967-04-07	Maruja Callaved	Cooking
La víspera de nuestro tiempo	La 2	1967-04-01		Science
Y al final esperanza	La 2	1967-01-06	Antonio Gala	Drama Series

== Television shows ==
=== La 1 ===
- Telediario (1957- )
- Tortuga perezosa, La (1961–1968)
- Ésta es su vida (1962–1968)
- Novela (1962–1979)
- Edición especial (1963–1969)
- Fin de semana (1963–1970)
- Panorama de actualidad (1963–1970)
- Séneca, El (1964–1970)
- Noche del sábado (1965–1968)
- Tema para el debate, Un (1965–1968)
- Historias para no dormir (1965–1970)
- Antena infantil (1965–1971)
- Ayer domingo (1965–1971)
- Estudio 1 (1965–1985)
- Biblioteca juvenil (1966–1968)
- Jardilín (1966–1968)
- Pequeña comedia, La (1966–1968)
- Día de fiesta (1966–1969)
- Misterios al descubierto (1966–1970)
- Cesta y puntos (1966–1971)
- The Chiripitiflauticos (1966–1976)
- Teatro breve (1966–1981)

=== La 2 ===
- Luz verde (1966–1968)
- Gama (1966–1970)
- Telecomedia de humor (1966–1971)
- Teatro de siempre (1966–1972)
- Luces en la noche (1966–1974)

== Ending this year ==
=== La 1 ===
- Escala en hi-fi (1961–1967)
- Revista para la mujer (1963–1967)
- A toda plana (1965–1967)
- Musical 14,05 (1965–1967)
- ¿Cuál es tu final? (1966–1967)
- Encuentros, Los (1966–1967)
- Gran premio (1966–1967)
- Habitación 508 (1966–1967)
- Imágenes para saber (1966–1967)
- Nosotras y ellos (1966–1967)

=== La 2 ===
- Autores invitados (1966–1967)
- Dichoso mundo (1966–1967)
- Juego de la oca, El (1966–1967)
- Mañana es sábado (1966–1967)

== Foreign series debuts in Spain ==
=== La 1 ===
- The Man from U.N.C.L.E. (El agente de CIPOL) (USA)
- Daktari (USA)
- Bolek i Lolek (Bolek y Lolek) (PL)
- Please Don't Eat the Daisies (Mis hombres y yo) (USA)
- Mission: Impossible (Misión imposible) (USA)
- The Monroes (Los Monroe) (USA)
- Lost in Space (Perdidos en el espacio) (USA)
- 77 Sunset Strip (USA)
- L'âne Culotte (Trotacaminos) (FR)
- The Avengers (Los Vengadores) (UK)
- The Big Valley (Valle de pasiones) (USA)

=== La 2 ===
- The Alaskans (Aventuras en Alaska) (USA)
- L'inspecteur Leclerc enquête (El inspector Leclerc) (FR)
- Wendy and Me (Wendy y yo) (USA)
- Mr. Magoo (USA)

== Births ==
- 16 January – Víctor Sandoval, host.
- 19 January – Javier Cámara, actor.
- 20 January – Pepón Nieto, actor.
- 2 February – Noemí Galera, casting director.
- 12 February – Ángeles Martín, actress and hostess.
- 22 February – Jorge Bosch, actor.
- 23 February – Verónica Mengod, actress and hostess.
- 21 March – María Rey, hostess.
- 2 April – Jon Sistiaga, journalist.
- 22 May – Paloma Lago, hostess.
- 23 June – Álex Pina, producer.
- 14 July – Raquel Revuelta, hostess.
- 15 August – Minerva Piquero, hostess.
- 27 September – Machús Osinaga, journalist.
- 29 September – Miki Nadal, comedian and host.
- 8 October – Yvonne Reyes, hostess.
- 14 October – Lola Marceli, actress.
- 15 October – Manuel Marlasca, journalist
- 4 November – Julian Iantzi, host.
- 11 November – Nathalie Seseña, actress.
- 12 December – Mikel López Iturriaga, host.
- 28 December – Mabel Lozano, actress and hostess.
- José Manuel Guisado "Mané", actor.
- Nuria Gallardo, actress.
- Sonsoles Suárez, hostess.

== See also ==
- 1967 in Spain
- List of Spanish films of 1967
