= 1980 in Spanish television =

This is a list of Spanish television related events in 1980.

== Events ==
- 10 January: Spanish Parliament passes Law 4/1980, that regulates the Radio & Television Organization in Spain. RTVE was configured, by statute, as a legal public entity with its own jurisdiction.

== Debuts ==
Title	Channel	Debut	Performers/Host	Genre
Ayer y hoy del flamenco	La 2	1980-04-01	Fernando Quiñones	Music
Cita con	La 1	1980-01-10	Aurora Claramunt	Music
Cosas	La 1	1980-01-11	Joaquín Prat	Variety show
De cerca	La 1	1980-01-21	Jesús Hermida	Talk show
Destino Plutón	La 1	1980-03-11	María Jesús Lleonart	Children
Ding-Dong	La 1	1980-03-14	Andrés Pajares	Quiz show
El dinero de todos	La 1	1980-05-09		Cultural/Science
El español y los siete pecados capitales	La 1	1980-10-24	Jesús Puente	Drama series
España entera	La 2	1980-04-13		Cultural/Science
Españoles en el Pacífico	La 1	1980-01-10	Miguel de la Quadra Salcedo	Documentary
Fortunata y Jacinta	La 1	1980-05-07	Ana Belén	Drama series
Horas doradas	La 1	1980-04-17		Music
La música	La 2	1980-01-27		Music
La música en el tiempo	La 2	1980-08-10		Music
La pesca	La 1	1980-06-05		Sport
Mañana será otra década	La 1	1980-12-31	Alfredo Amestoy	Variety
Mirador de los Sport	La 2	1980-01-10	Miguel Ors	Sport
Music express	La 2	1980-04-02	Àngel Casas	Music
Revista de prensa	La 1	1980-04-15	Fernando Ónega	News
Ruy, the Little Cid	La 1	1980-09-10		Animation
Sin fronteras	La 1	1980-01-25	Joaquín Soler Serrano	Talk Show
Sobre la renta	La 1	1980-04-17		Cultural/Science

== Television shows ==
=== La 1 ===
- Telediario (1957– )
- Estudio 1 (1965–1981)
- Teatro breve (1966–1981)
- Revista de toros (1971–1983)
- Estudio estadio (1972–2005)
- Informe Semanal (1973– )
- El gran circo de TVE (1973–1983)
- Siete días (1974–1981)
- 625 Lineas (1976–1981)
- Gente hoy (1976–1981)
- Gente joven (1976–1987)
- Hablamos (1977–1982)
- 300 millones (1977–1983)
- El Canto de un duro (1978–1981)
- Parlamento (1978–2014)
- Aplauso (1978–1983)
- Vivir cada día (1978–1988)
- Gaceta cultural (1979–1981)
- La Mansión de los Plaff (1979–1981)
- Un Mundo para ellos (1979–1983)
- Más vale prevenir (1979–1987)
- Barrio Sésamo (1979–2000)

=== La 2 ===
- Ficciones (1971–1981)
- Polideportivo (1973–1981)
- Revista de cine (1974–1981)
- A fondo (1976–1981)
- Encuentros con las letras (1976–1981)
- Más allá (1976–1981)
- La Clave (1976–1983)
- Horizontes (1977–1981)
- Popgrama (1977–1981)
- Teatro estudio (1977–1981)
- Imágenes (1978–1981)
- Opinión pública (1978–1981)
- Retrato en vivo (1979–1982)

== Ending this year ==
=== La 1 ===
- El hombre y la Tierra (1974–1980)
- El Mundo de la música (1975–1980)
- Fantástico ( 1978–1980)
- 003 y medio (1979–1980)
- Canciones de una vida (1979–1980)

=== La 2 ===
- Tribuna internacional (1979–1980)

== Foreign series debuts in Spain ==
English title	Spanish title	Original title	Channel	Country	Performers
240-Robert	240-Robert		La 1	USA	J.B.Perry, M.Harmon, J.Cassidy
Alice	Alicia		La 1	USA	Linda Lavin
Brave New World	Un mundo feliz		La 1	USA	Keir Dullea
Children of Fire Mountain	Los chicos de la montaña de fuego		La 1	NZL	Terence Cooper
Chopper One	Patrulla especial		La 1	USA	Jim McMullan, Dirk Benedict
Come Back, Lucy	La vuelta de Lucy		La 2	UK	Emma Bakhle
Doctor in the House	Doctor en casa		La 1	UK	Barry Evans
Dr. Simon Locke	Doctor Locke		La 1	CAN	Sam Groom
Edward & Mrs. Simpson	Eduardo y la señora Simpson		La 1	UK	Edward Fox
Fantasy Island	La isla de la fantasía		La 2	USA	Ricardo Montalbán, Hervé Villechaize
From Here to Eternity	De aquí a a eternidad		La 1	USA	Natalie Wood
Gatchaman	La batalla de los planetas	Kagaku Ninjatai Gatchaman	La 1	JAP	
Gibbsville	Gibbsville		La 1	USA	John Savage
Good Heavens	Señor Angel		La 1	USA	Carl Reiner
Here We Go Again	Aquí estoy otra vez		La 1	USA	Larry Hagman, Diane Baker
How Green Was My Valley	Qué verde era mi valle		La 1	UK	Stanley Baker, Siân Phillips
Just William	Guillermo, el travieso		La 1	UK	Adrian Dannatt, Bonnie Langford
Laff-A-Lympics	Las Olimpiadas de la risa		La 1	USA	
Lou Grant	Lou Grant		La 2	USA	Ed Asner
Misha the Little Bear	El osito Misha	Koguma no Mīsha	La 1	JAP	
Mork & Mindy	Mork y Mindy		La 2	USA	Robin Williams
Mr. Rossi	Señor Rossi	Signor Rossi	La 2	ITA	
Oh No, It's Selwyn Froggitt	Selwyn		La 1	UK	Bill Maynard
Open All Hours	Déjeme respirar		La 1	UK	Ronnie Barker
Penmarric	Penmarric		La 1	UK	Annabel Leventon, Peter Blake
Persuasion	Persuasión		La 1	UK	Ann Firbank
Pride and Prejudice	Orgullo y prejuicio		La 1	UK	Elizabeth Garvie, David Rintoul
Quark	La escoba espacial		La 1	USA	Richard Benjamin
Salvage 1	Código Rescate 1		La 1	USA	A.Griffith, J.Higgins, T.Stewart
Supertrain	Supertren		La 2	USA	Edward Andrews
Taxi	Taxi		La 1	USA	T.Danza, J.Conaway, D.DeVito
The Adventures of Tom Sawyer	Las aventuras de Tom Sawyer	Tomu Sôyâ no bôken	La 1	JAP	
The Bob Crane Show	Bob Crane		La 1	USA	Bob Crane
The French Atlantic Affair	Incidente en el Atlántico		La 1	USA	Telly Savalas, Chad Everett
The Life and Times of Grizzly Adams	Grizzly Adams		La 1	USA	Dan Haggerty
The Littlest Hobo	Hobo		La 1	CAN	
The Tomorrow People	Hombres del mañana		La 1	UK	Nicholas Young
Those Amazing Animals	Esos asombrosos animales		La 1	USA	B.Meredith, J.Stafford, P.Presley
Vega$	Las Vegas		La 2	USA	Robert Urich
We've Got Each Other	Entre dos que bien se quieren		La 1	USA	Oliver Clark, Beverly Archer
Wheels	Detroit		La 1	USA	Rock Hudson, Lee Remick
Yogi's Space Race	La carrera espacial de Yogui		La 2	USA	

== Births ==
- 2 January – Laura Lobo, actress & hostess.
- 4 January – Alexandra Jiménez, actress.
- 12 January – Nuria Bermúdez, pundit.
- 14 January – Carolina Cerezuela, actress y hostess.
- 21 February – Inés Paz, hostess.
- 25 February – Javier Rey, actor.
- 13 March – Kira Miró, hostess.
- 3 April – Fernando Ramallo, actor.
- 12 April – David Amor, actor & comedian.
- 29 April – Marc Clotet, actor.
- 2 May – Jorge Blass, magician y host.
- 19 May – Christian Gálvez, host.
- 23 May – Miren Ibarguren, actress.
- 25 June – Inma Cuesta, actress
- 6 July – Leandro Rivera, actor y host.
- 9 July – Julián González, actor.
- 13 August – Álex González, actor.
- 25 September – Olivia Molina, actress.
- 8 October – Lara de Miguel, actress.
- 11 October – Pablo Rivero, actor.
- 20 October – Alberto Amarilla, actor.
- 25 October – Álvaro Zancajo, journalist.
- 31 October – Carlos Franganillo, journalist.
- 5 November – Eva González, hostess.
- 4 December – Carles Francino, actor.
- 10 December – Miren Ibarguren, actress.

== Deaths ==
- 15 March – Félix Rodríguez de la Fuente, host, 52.
- 16 May – José Calvo, actor, 64.

== See also ==
- List of Spanish films of 1980
