= 1978 in Spanish television =

This is a list of Spanish television related events in 1978.

== Events ==
- 25 January: The four directors of the only news program in the country, Telediario, Ladislao Azcona, Eduardo Sotillos, Pedro Macía y Miguel Ángel Gozalo, resign from their position because of disagreements with the channel director.

== Debuts ==
Original Title	Channel	Debut	Performer / Hosts	Genre
Aplauso	La 1	1978-06-07	José Luis Uribarri	Music
Buenas noticias	La 1	1978-08-01	Tico Medina	News
El Camino	La 1	1978-04-17	Enriqueta Carballeira	Fiction
Cantares	La 1	1978-02-03	Lauren Postigo	Music
Cañas y barro	La 1	1978-03-11	Victoria Vera	Drama series
¿Conocemos España?	La 1	1978-04-10	Mario Beut	Quiz show
Destino Argentina	La 1	1978-02-25	Joaquín Prat	Quiz show
Diálogos constitucionales	La 1	1978-08-16		Science/Culture
Dos por dos	La 1	1978-04-04	Mercedes Milá	Talk show
Dossier	La 1	1978-04-08		Documentary
El canto de un duro	La 1	1978-05-05	Mari Carmen García Vela	Science/Culture
El estado de la cuestión	La 1	1978-04-08	María José Valero	News
El Hotel de las mil y una estrellas	La 1	1978-12-08	Luis Aguilé	Music
El juglar y la reina	La 1	1978-10-20		Drama series
Escala internacional	La 1	1978-01-18	José Antequera	Variety Show
Fantástico	La 1	1978-10-22	José María Íñigo	Magazine
Imágenes	La 2	1977-10-17	Paloma Chamorro	Science/Culture
La España de los Botejara	La 1	1978-08-21	Alfredo Amestoy	Docudrama
La segunda oportunidad	La 1	1978-10-19	Paco Costas	Science/Culture
Los espectáculos	La 1	1978-07-05	Isabel Bauzá	Variety Show
Memorias del cine español	La 1	1978-04-05		Movies
Nombres de ayer	La 1	1978-10-16	Mario Antolín	Science/Culture
Nombres de hoy	La 1	1978-10-16	Mario Antolín	Science/Culture
Nuestras islas	La 1	1978-04-12		Documentary
Perfiles	La 1	1978-04-06	Joaquín Soler Serrano	Talk show
Sumarísimo	La 1	1978-12-11	Manolo Codeso	Comedy
Tribuna de la Cultura	La 2	1978-06-29	Joaquín Castro Beraza	Science/Culture
Tribuna de la Historia	La 2	1978-06-28	José Antonio Silva	Science/Culture
Tribuna del Parlamento	La 2	1978-04-09		News
Tribuna económica	La 2	1978-10-11	Rafael Romero	Science/Culture
Vivir cada día	La 1	1978-04-13	José Luis Rodríguez Puértolas	Docudrama

== Television shows ==
=== La 1 ===
- Telediario (1957- )
- Novela (1962-1979)
- Estudio 1 (1965-1981)
- Teatro breve (1966-1981)
- Revista de toros (1971-1983)
- Un, dos, tres... responda otra vez (1972-2004)
- Estudio estadio (1972-2005)
- Informe Semanal (1973- )
- El gran circo de TVE (1973-1983)
- Un Globo, dos globos, tres globos (1974-1979)
- El hombre y la Tierra (1974-1980)
- Siete días (1974-1981)
- El Mundo de la música (1975-1980)
- 625 Lineas (1976-1981)
- Gente hoy (1976-1981)
- Gente joven (1976-1987)
- Hora 15 (1977-1979)
- El Recreo (1977-1979)
- Hablamos (1977-1982)
- 300 millones (1977-1983)

=== La 2 ===
- Torneo (1967-1979)
- Ficciones (1971-1981)
- Polideportivo (1973-1981)
- Revista de cine (1974-1981)
- Redacción noche (1976-1979)
- A Fondo (1976-1981)
- Encuentros con las letras (1976-1981)
- Más allá (1976-1981)
- La Clave (1976-1983)
- Horizontes (1977-1981)
- Popgrama (1977-1981)
- Teatro estudio (1977-1981)

== Ending this year ==
=== La 1 ===
- El Mundo en acción (1973-1978)
- Curro Jiménez (1976-1978)
- Última hora (1976-1978)
- La Semana (1974-1978)
- Lengua viva (1977-1978)
- El Monstruo de Sanchezstein (1977-1978)
- Mundo noche (1977-1978)
- Las Reglas del juego (1977-1978)
- Yo canto (1977-1978)

=== La 2 ===
- Teatro Club (1976-1978)

== Foreign series debuts in Spain ==
English title	Spanish title	Original title	Country	Performers
--	Las aventuras del oso Colargol	Les Aventures de Colargol	FRA	
Baretta	Baretta		USA	Robert Blake
Charlie's Angels	Los ángeles de Charlie		USA	Kate Jackson, Farrah Fawcett, Jaclyn Smith
Holmes & Yoyo	Holmes y Yoyo		USA	Richard B. Shull, John Schuck
I, Claudius	Yo, Claudio		UK	Derek Jacobi
Long Journey Back	El largo viaje		USA	Mike Connors
Man About the House	Un hombre en casa		UK	Richard O'Sullivan, Paula Wilcox, Sally Thomsett
Maya the Honey Bee	La abeja Maya	Mitsubachi Māya no Bōken	JAP	
Mazinger Z	Mazinger Z	Majingā Zetto	JAP	
Monarch: The Big Bear of Tallac	El bosque de Tallac	Seton Doubutsuki: Kuma no Ko Jacky	JAP	
Orzowei	Orzowei	Orzowei, il figlio della savana	ITA	Peter Marshall
QB VII	QB VII		USA	Ben Gazzara, Anthony Hopkins
—N/a	El aventurero Simplicissimus	Abenteuerlicher Simplizissimus	GER	Matthias Habich
The Fantastic Journey	Viaje fantástico		USA	Jared Martin
The Invisible Man	El hombre invisible		USA	David McCallum
The Love Boat	Vacaciones en el mar		USA	Gavin MacLeod, Bernie Kopell, Lauren Tewes
The Muppet Show	El show de los Teleñecos		USA	
The Water Margin	La frontera azul	Suikoden	JAP	Atsuo Nakamura

== Births ==
- 9 January - Cristina Lasvignes, presenter
- 2 February - Macarena Gómez, actress.
- 4 March - María Casado, hostess.
- 10 March - Marta Torné, actress.
- 9 April - Salva Reina, actor.
- 20 May - Edu Soto, actor and comedian.
- 26 May - Rocío Madrid, hostess.
- 10 June - Vanessa Romero, actress.
- 29 June - Jordi Cruz, chef and host.
- 16 July - Irene Visedo, actress.
- 18 July - Verónica Romero, singer.
- 21 July - Marta Flich, actress and hostess.
- 1 August - Begoña Maestre, actress.
- 12 September - Nacho Rubio, actor.
- 11 October - Oriol Nolis, host.
- 30 October - Cristina Castaño, actress.
- 20 November - Fran Perea, actor and singer.
- 27 November - Manu Fullola, actor.
- José Ángel Leiras, host.

== Deaths ==
- 13 August - José María Prada, actor, 53.

== See also ==
- 1978 in Spain
- List of Spanish films of 1978
