= 1971 in Spanish television =

This is a list of Spanish television related events in 1971.

== Events ==
- 3 April: Karina represents Spain at the Eurovision Song Contest 1971 hold in Dublin (Ireland) with the song "En un mundo nuevo", ranking second with 116 points.

== Debuts ==
=== La 1 ===
- A través de la niebla
- Crónicas de un pueblo
- Del dicho al hecho
- Las doce caras de Eva
- Los tres mosqueteros
- Visto para sentencia
- ...Y siete
- A cinco años vista
- A todo ritmo
- Al compás de las estrellas
- El anticuario
- Antología lírica
- Camino de Santiago
- Canción 71
- La casa del reloj
- Catedráticos del ritmo
- Cita con el humor
- Cómo es y cómo se hace
- Dominio del mar
- Érase que se era
- Escalera de color
- España en directo
- Grandes batallas
- Imágenes 71
- Juegos para mayores
- Leer, saber y ganar
- Microespacio
- Mirada al mundo
- El mundo
- Música para ver
- La noche de los tiempos
- Obra completa
- Premio al mejor
- Protagonistas, los pueblos
- Revista de toros
- Siempre en domingo
- Subasta de triunfos
- TVEO
- La última palabra
- Últimas noticias
- Vivir es lo que importa

=== La 2 ===
- La tía de Ambrosio
- Ficciones
- Aventura del jazz
- Los 7 mares
- Los caminos del arte
- Los combates del siglo
- Los fabulosos años 60
- Íntima armonía
- Jazz vivo
- Llamada
- Más lejos
- Meridiano 71º Oeste
- El mundo en que vivimos
- Mundo exótico
- Narraciones
- Nuestras ciudades
- Rito y geografía del cante
- Sombras recobradas
- Trenes del mundo
- Última imagen
- ...y siete

== Television shows ==
=== La 1 ===
- Telediario (1957– )
- Novela (1962–1979)
- Estudio 1 (1965–1981)
- The Chiripitiflauticos (1966–1976)
- Teatro breve (1966–1981)
- Club mediodía (1967–1972)
- Por tierra, mar y aire (1968–1972)
- Pequeño estudio (1968–1974)
- Cuentos y leyendas (1968–1976)
- Fórmula Todo (1969–1972)
- Ojos nuevos (1970–1972)
- El último café (1970–1972)
- 24 horas (1970–1973)
- Buenas tardes (1970–1974)
- Con vosotros (1970–1974)
- Planeta azul (1970–1974)
- Hoy también es fiesta (1970–1975)

=== La 2 ===
- Teatro de siempre (1966–1972)
- Luces en la noche (1966–1974)
- Torneo (1967–1979)
- Hora once (1969–1974)
- Festival (1970–1974)
- Estudio abierto (1970–1985)

== Ending this year ==
=== La 1 ===
- Antena infantil (1965–1971)
- Ayer domingo (1965–1971)
- La casa de los Martínez (1967–1971)
- Cesta y puntos (1966–1971)
- En equipo (1970–1971)
- La semana que viene (1970–1971)
- Las Tentaciones 1970–1971)
- Voces de oro (1970–1971)

=== La 2 ===
- Sospecha (1963–1971)
- Telecomedia de humor (1966–1971)

== Foreign series debuts in Spain ==
=== La 1 ===
- He & She (Él y ella) (USA)
- Jekyll (ITA)
- Marcus Welby, M.D. (Marcus Welby) (USA)
- The Forsyte Saga (La saga de los Forsyte) (UK)
- The Good Guys (Dos tontos en apuros) (USA)
- The Partridge Family (Mamá y sus increíbles hijos) (USA)
- The Persuaders! (Los persuasores) (UK)
- To Rome with Love (Roma, mi amor) (USA)

=== La 2 ===
- From a Bird's Eye View (Dos chicas de altura) (USA)
- Hawaii Five-O (USA)
- M Squad (Ballinger de Chicago) (USA)
- Mona McCluskey (Carol y Mike) (USA)
- The Archie Show (Torombolo y sus amigos) (USA)
- The Mod Squad (Patrulla juvenil) (USA)
- Zane Grey (USA)

== Births ==
- 14 January – Manel Fuentes, host.
- 26 January – Màxim Huerta, host.
- 5 March – Begoña Alegría, journalist.
- 8 April – Cristina Medina, actress.
- 10 April – Silvia Abril, actress and comedian.
- 14 April – Gema López, journalist.
- 7 May – Lola Baldrich, actress.
- 7 May – Malena Gracia, showoman.
- 6 June – Silvia Jato, hostess.
- 8 June – Luis Fraga, host.
- 19 June – Eva Isanta, actress.
- 19 June – Nacho Fresneda, actor.
- 21 June – Pedro Alonso, actor.
- 30 June – Guillermo Ortega, actor.
- 5 July – Roberto Vilar, host
- 8 August – Jorge Fernández, host.
- 15 August – María Patiño, journalist.
- 29 August – Antonio Garrido, actor.
- 29 August – Frank Cuesta, host
- 23 September – Lara Dibildos, hostess.
- 22 October – Mavi Doñate, journalist.
- 4 December – Marta Jaumandreu, hostess.
- 23 December – Daniel Albaladejo, actor.

== See also ==
- 1971 in Spain
- List of Spanish films of 1971
