= 1974 in Spanish television =

This is a list of Spanish television related events in 1974.

== Events ==
- 11 January: Juan José Rosón is appointed Director General of RTVE.
- 24 April: The reporter Manolo Alcalá covers from Lisbon for TVE the Carnation Revolution.
- 12 June: The Commission for Enquiry and Vigilance on Advertising in TVE is created.
- 22 November: Jesús Sancho Rof is appointed Director General of RTVE.

== Debuts ==
Original Title	Channel	Debut	Performer / Hosts	Genre
35 millones de españoles	La 1	1975-12-04	José Antonio Plaza	Variety Show
A su aire	La 1	1975-03-28		Music
Ahora	La 2	1974-11-17		Music
Archivo de España	La 1	1974-10-06		Science/Culture
Así fue...	La 2	1974-04-20	Jana Escribano	Science/Culture
Cambie su suerte	La 1	1974-04-02	Joaquín Prat	Quiz Show
Cantar y reír	La 1	1974-12-23	Los Payasos de la Tele	Children
Cara al país	La 1	1974-04-19	Josep Meliá	Debate
Clases magistrales	La 2	1974-02-02		Science/Culture
Cuentopos	La 1	1974-10-24	Tina Sáinz	Children
Cultural 2	La 2	1974-12-08	Fernando Méndez Leite	Science/Culture
Don Juan	La 1	1974-06-01	Pedro Osinaga	Especial
El hombre y la Tierra	La 1	1974-03-04	Félix Rodríguez de la Fuente	Documentary
El pícaro	La 1	1974-10-14	Fernando Fernán Gómez	Drama series
El Teatro	La 1	1974-10-11		Theatre
Escritores de hoy	La 1	1974-11-05		Theatre
¡Fiesta!	La 1	1974-10-19	Judy Stephen	Children
Historias con letra y música	La 1	1974-11-24		Music
Hoy 14’15	La 1	1974-10-02	José María Íñigo	Variety Show
Informativo 2	La 2	1974-07-07		News
Juan y Manuela	La 1	1974-04-16	Ana Diosdado	Sitcom
La cometa naranja	La 1	1974-04-14		Children
La Prehistoria del futuro	La 1	1974-03-06	Luis Miravitlles	Science/Culture
La semana	La 1	1974-10-10	Carmen Lázaro	Youth
Las Instituciones	La 1	1974-10-17		News
¿Le conoce usted?	La 1	1974-11-26	Pedro Ruiz	Quiz Show
Lecciones con...	La 1	1974-10-19	Andrés Gimeno	Sport
Lo de Tip y Coll	La 1	1974-10-06	Tip y Coll	Comedy
Los libros	La 1	1974-02-03		Fiction
Los maniáticos	La 1	1974-07-30	José Sazatornil	Sitcom
Los pajaritos	La 1	1974-01-21	Julia Caba Alba	Telefilme
Los pintores del Prado	La 1	1974-04-17		Fiction
Los reporteros	La 1	1975-06-15	Diego Carcedo	Documentary
Más allá de la noticia	La 1	1975-11-26		News
Mundo pop	La 1	1974-05-08	Fernando Garciapelayo	Music
Musical pop	La 2	1974-11-14	Ramón Trecet	Music
Noche de teatro	La 1	1974-04-19		Theatre
Operación torpedo	La 1	1974-05-08	José Miguel Flores	Quiz show
Original	La 1	1974-11-27		Fiction
Palabras cruzadas	La 2	1974-12-18		Fiction
Planeta vivo	La 2	1974-11-13		Documentary
Primera hora	La 1	1974-10-06		Children
Programa regional simultáneo	La 1	1974-12-02		News
Reflexión	La 1	1974-10-13		Religion
Revista de cine	La 1	1974-01-06	Alfonso Eduardo	Movies
Semana nueva	La 2	1974-04-15		Variety Show
¡Señoras y señores!	La 1	1974-05-04	Victoria Vera	Variety Show
Siete días	La 1	1974-10-06	José Antonio Silva	News
Silencio, estrenamos	La 1	1974-04-17	Adolfo Marsillach	Fiction
Sobre el terreno	La 1	1974-09-08	Juan José Castillo	Sport
Su mundo de usted	La 1	1974-05-11		Science/Culture
Sucede	La 1	1974-05-10		News
Suspiros de España	La 1	1974-10-11	Antonio Ferrandis	Fiction
Telecomedia	La 1			
Tele-Revista	La 1	1974-05-06	Clara Isabel Francia	Science/Culture
Tele-Show	La 2			
Temas 74	La 2	1974-11-08		Variety Show
Todo es posible en domingo	La 1	1974-03-24	Juan Antonio Fernández Abajo	Variety Show
Un globo, dos globos, tres globos	La 1	1974-10-06	María Luisa Seco	Children
Un momento, por favor	La 1	1974-06-15		Religion

== Television shows ==
=== La 1 ===
- Telediario (1957– )
- Novela (1962–1979)
- Estudio 1 (1965–1981)
- The Chiripitiflauticos (1966–1976)
- Teatro breve (1966–1981)
- Cuentos y leyendas (1968–1976)
- Hoy también es fiesta (1970–1975)
- Revista de toros (1971–1983)
- Estudio estadio (1972–2005)
- Informe Semanal (1973– )
- El Mundo en acción (1973–1978)
- El gran circo de TVE (1973–1983)

=== La 2 ===
- Torneo (1967–1979)
- Estudio abierto (1970–1985)
- Ficciones (1971–1981)
- Polideportivo (1973–1981)

== Ending this year ==
=== La 1 ===
- Pequeño estudio (1968–1974)
- Buenas tardes (1970–1974)
- Con vosotros (1970–1974)
- Planeta azul (1970–1974)
- La Casa del reloj (1971–1974)
- Crónicas de un pueblo (1971–1974)
- Subasta de triunfos (1971–1974)
- La Gran ocasión (1972–1974)
- El Juego de la foca (1972–1974)
- Tarde para todos (1972–1974)
- Camino del récord (1973–1974)
- Los camioneros (1973–1974)
- Llegada internacional (1973–1974)
- Si yo fuera rico (1973–1974)

=== La 2 ===
- Luces en la noche (1966–1974)
- Hora once (1969–1974)
- Galería (1973–1974)
- Festival (1970–1974)

== Foreign series debuts in Spain ==
=== La 1 ===
- Banacek (USA)
- Calimero (JAP)
- Door into Darkness (La puerta en la oscuridad) (ITA)
- Gunsmoke (La ley del revólver) (USA)
- McCloud (USA)
- Paul Temple (UK)
- Pippi Longstocking (Pippi Calzaslargas) (SWE)
- Schulmeister, l'espion de l'empereur (El espía del emperador (FRA)
- Search (Investigación) (USA)
- Sherlock Holmes (UK)
- The Julie Andrews Hour (La hora de Julie Andrews) (USA)
- The Onedin Line (La línea Onedin) (UK)
- The Protectors (Los protectores) (UK)

=== La 2 ===
- Boney (AUS)
- Goober and the Ghost Chasers (USA)
- Ivanhoe (UK)
- The F.B.I. (El F.B.I.) (USA)
- The Jackson 5ive (USA)
- The Streets of San Francisco (Las calles de San Francisco) (USA)
- The Wonderful Stories of Professor Kitzel (El profesor Kitzel) (CAN)
- The World at War (El mundo en guerra) (UK)

== Births ==
- 16 January – Àngel Llàcer, actor.
- 21 January – Malena Alterio, actress.
- 9 February – Helena Resano, hostess.
- 21 March – Pilar García Muñiz, hostess.
- 22 March – Paco Marín, actor.
- 2 April – Isabel Rábago, journalist.
- 3 April – Inma del Moral, hostess.
- 28 April – Penélope Cruz, actress.
- 23 May – Mónica Naranjo, singer, hostess and jury member.
- 9 June – Fernando Coronado, actor.
- 18 June – Itziar Ituño, actress.
- 19 June – Sandra Golpe, hostess.
- 23 June – Carlos del Amor, journalist.
- 1 July – Octavi Pujades, actor.
- 21 July –
  - Carlota Corredera, director and hostess.
  - Jordi Évole, host.
- 16 August – Joaquín Reyes, comedian.
- 27 August – Carolina Ferre, hostess.
- 1 September – Laura Fa, pundit.
- 21 September – Diego Martín, actor.
- 25 September – Mara Torres, hostess.
- 2 October – Thais Villas, journalist.
- 9 October – Eugenia Santana, hostess.
- 17 November – Berto Romero, comedian.
- 26 November – Paula Vázquez, hostess.
- 20 December – Esperanza Pedreño, actress.
- Daniel Domenjó, host.
- Sandra Morey, hostess.

== Deaths ==
- 23 January – Artur Kaps, director, 61.
- 11 February – Antonio Casal, actor, 63.
- 16 September – Luis Morris, actor, 44.
- 20 November – Manuel Dicenta, actor, 69.

== See also ==
- 1974 in Spain
- List of Spanish films of 1974
