= 1973 in Spanish television =

This is a list of Spanish television related events in 1973.

== Events ==
- 31 March: Informe Semanal debuts at La 1, becoming the longest running TV program in Spain, still running 49 years after.
- 7 April: Mocedades represents Spain at the Spain in the Eurovision Song Contest 1973 hold in Luxembourg, with the song Eres tú ranking 2nd with 125 points.
- 28 June: Rafael Orbe Cano is appointed Director General of RTVE.
- 19 July: Los payasos de la tele debut in Televisión Española with their show El gran circo de TVE.
- 23 November: Debut of the telefilm Juan Soldado, by Fernando Fernán Gómez, awarded in the Prague Television Festival.

== Debuts ==
=== La 1 ===
- Los camioneros
- Compañera te doy
- Juan Soldado
- Si yo fuera rico
- Beat Club
- La bolsa de las palabras
- Camino del record
- Centinelas del bosque
- Estelar
- Galería
- La gente quiere saber
- El gran circo de TVE
- Informe Semanal
- Llegada internacional
- El millonario
- Mónica a medianoche
- El mundo en acción
- Los mundos hablan
- Noticias del Domingo
- Las oscuras raíces
- Pura coincidencia
- Santos oficios
- Las siete y media musical
- El silencio

=== La 2 ===
- Atril
- Beat-Club
- Biografía
- Centinelas del bosque
- Cita con la historia
- Defensores públicos
- Evasiones célebres
- Las grandes batallas
- Hoy hablamos de...
- La ley de los profetas
- Meridiano 0
- Mi mundo
- Noticias del Domingo
- Oficos para el recuerdo
- Oración
- Polideportivo
- Primer mundo
- Tertulia

== Television shows ==
=== La 1 ===
- Telediario (1957– )
- Novela (1962–1979)
- Estudio 1 (1965–1981)
- The Chiripitiflauticos (1966–1976)
- Teatro breve (1966–1981)
- Pequeño estudio (1968–1974)
- Cuentos y leyendas (1968–1976)
- Buenas tardes (1970–1974)
- Con vosotros (1970–1974)
- Planeta azul (1970–1974)
- Hoy también es fiesta (1970–1975)
- La Casa del reloj (1971–1974)
- Crónicas de un pueblo (1971–1974)
- Subasta de triunfos (1971–1974)
- Revista de toros (1971–1983)
- La Gran ocasión (1972–1974)
- El Juego de la foca (1972–1974)
- Tarde para todos (1972–1974)
- Un, dos, tres... responda otra vez (1972–2004)
- Estudio estadio (1972–2005)

=== La 2 ===
- Luces en la noche (1966–1974)
- Torneo (1967–1979)
- Hora once (1969–1974)
- Festival (1970–1974)
- Estudio abierto (1970–1985)
- Ficciones (1971–1981)

== Ending this year ==
=== La 1 ===
- 24 horas (1970–1973)
- Animales racionales (1972–1973)
- Divertido siglo (1972–1973)
- Historias de Juan Español (1972–1973)
- Juego de letras (1972–1973)
- Si las piedras hablaran (1972–1973)
- Tres eran tres (1972–1973)
- Vuestro amigo Quique (1972–1973)

=== La 2 ===
- Más lejos (1971–1973)

== Foreign series debuts in Spain ==
=== La 1 ===
- Alias Smith and Jones (Los dos mosqueteros) (USA)
- Arnie (USA)
- Cannon (USA)
- Columbo (Colombo) (USA)
- El Chavo del Ocho (MEX)
- Here Come the Double Deckers! (El clan de los pilluelos) (UK)
- Kung Fu (USA)
- Madigan (USA)
- Nichols (USA)
- Storefront Lawyers (Defensores públicos) (USA)
- The Adventures of Pinocchio (Pinocho) (ITA)
- The Chicago Teddy Bears (Los chiflados de Chicago) (USA)
- The Governor & J.J. (Jennie, la hija del gobernador) (USA)
- The Jimmy Stewart Show (El show de James Stewart) (USA)
- The Man and the City (El hombre y la ciudad) (USA)
- UFO (OVNI) (UK)

=== La 2 ===
- Grindl (USA)
- Jonny Quest (USA)
- Pan Tau (CZE)
- The Pink Panther Show (El show de la Pantera Rosa) (USA)
- The Porky Pig Show (Porky Pig) (USA)

== Births ==
- 10 January – Iker Jiménez, host.
- 15 January – Miguel Joven, actor.
- 17 January – Ángeles Blanco, hostess.
- 11 February – Javier Veiga, actor.
- 18 February – Melanie Olivares, actress.
- 8 March – Álex O'Dogherty, actor.
- 14 March – Raquel Sánchez-Silva, hostess and actress.
- 15 March – Carla Hidalgo, hostess.
- 19 March – Elia Galera, actress and hostess.
- 3 May – Lourdes Maldonado, hostess.
- 4 May – Tony Aguilar, host.
- 5 May – David Janer, actor.
- 7 June – Toñi Moreno, hostess.
- 8 June – Emma García, hostess.
- 30 June – Mónica Aragón, actress and hostess.
- 19 July – Antonio Zabálburu, actor.
- 20 July – Macarena Berlín, hostess.
- 22 July – Jaime Cantizano, host.
- 4 August – Iñaki López, journalist.
- 12 August – Carlos Chamarro, actor.
- 18 August – Javier Ruiz, journalist.
- 7 September – Laura Pamplona, actress.
- 8 September – Marta Fernández Vázquez, hostess.
- 16 September – Luis Larrodera, host.
- 21 September – Daniel Guzmán, actor.
- 26 September – Antonio Parreño, journalist.
- 1 October – Ana Terradillos, hostess.
- 4 October – Paco León, actor.
- 7 October – Emilio Pineda, host.
- 23 October – Ibon Uzkudun, host.
- 3 November – Ana Milán, actress.
- 9 November – Belén Esteban, hostess.
- 11 November – Carme Chaparro, hostess.
- 16 November – David Valldeperas, director, writer and host.
- 18 November – Neus Sanz, actress.
- 19 November – Iván Sánchez, actor.
- 5 December – Patricia Pérez, hostess.
- 11 December – Lorena Berdún, hostess and actress.
- Jennifer Rope, hostess.
- Ana Villa, actress.

== Deaths ==
- 24 February – Claudio Guerin, director, 34.

== See also ==
- 1973 in Spain
- List of Spanish films of 1973
