= 1970 in Spanish television =

This is a list of Spanish television related events in 1970.

== Events ==
- 21 March: Julio Iglesias performing the song Gwendolyne represents Spain a España en el Eurovision Song Contest 1970, that took place in Ámsterdam (Netherlands), ranking 4th, receiving 8 points.

== Debuts ==
=== La 1 ===
- Al filo de lo imposible
- Bajo el mismo techo
- Diana en negro
- Eva frente al espejo
- Pajareando
- Remite: Maribel
- Teatro de misterio
- Las tentaciones
- El último café
- Violeta en la país de la fantasía
- 24 horas
- Animalia
- Aventuras
- Buenas tardes
- Cinco estrellas
- El Cine
- Cine cómico
- Cine para todos
- Conviene saber
- Con vosotros
- Crónica de un maestro
- Cuarto continente
- Danzas españolas
- En equipo
- Los españoles
- Estudio loco
- Los felices 70
- Festival
- Hablemos de España
- Hispanovisión
- Hoy también es fiesta
- La huelga del hombre
- Investigación en marcha
- Los miércoles de Pablo VI
- Mirada al mundo
- Noticias a las 3
- Ojos nuevos
- Pasaporte a Dublín
- Personajes a trasluz
- Planeta azul
- Primera hora
- Un pueblo para Europa
- Puerta grande
- Segundos fuera
- La semana que viene
- Sinfonía 2
- Sobre la marcha
- Tiempo libre
- Tiempo para creer
- Vida salvaje
- Voces de oro

=== La 2 ===
- Páginas sueltas
- Viaje alrededor de una pareja
- Antología
- Desde mi butaca
- Imágenes y melodías
- Itinerarios románticos
- Estudio abierto
- Festival
- Galería
- Grandes intérpretes
- Lo que va de siglo
- Nocturno
- Noticia 2
- Palmo a palmo
- Recuerdos de España

== Television shows ==
=== La 1 ===
- Telediario (1957–present)
- Novela (1962–1979)
- Antena infantil (1965–1971)
- Ayer domingo (1965–1971)
- Estudio 1 (1965–1981)
- The Chiripitiflauticos (1966–1976)
- Teatro breve (1966–1981)
- La casa de los Martínez (1967–1971)
- Club mediodía (1967–1972)
- Por tierra, mar y aire (1968–1972)
- Pequeño estudio (1968–1974)
- Cuentos y leyendas (1968–1976)
- Fórmula Todo (1969–1972)

=== La 2 ===
- Sospecha (1963–1971)
- Telecomedia de humor (1966–1971)
- Teatro de siempre (1966–1972)
- Luces en la noche (1966–1974)
- Torneo (1967–1979)
- Hora once (1969–1974)

== Ending this year ==
=== La 1 ===
- Fin de semana (1963–1970)
- Panorama de actualidad (1963–1970)
- El Séneca (1964–1970)
- Historias para no dormir (1965–1970)
- Misterios al descubierto (1966–1970)
- Festival de la Canción Infantil de TVE (1967–1970)
- Fábulas (1968–1970)
- Fauna (1968–1970)
- Manos al volante (1968–1970)
- Nivel de vida (1968–1970)
- Quiniela, La (1968–1970)
- Tele-club (1968–1970)
- Cita con Tony Leblanc (1969–1970)
- Las Diez de últimas (1969–1970)
- Especial pop (1969–1970)
- El Espectador y el lenguaje (1969–1970)
- Esta noche con... (1969–1970)
- Galas del sábado (1969–1970)
- Los Hombres saben, los pueblos marchan (1969–1970)
- La Huella del hombre (1969–1970)
- Rimas populares (1969–1970)

=== La 2 ===
- Gama (1966–1970)

== Foreign series debuts in Spain ==
English title	Spanish title	Country	Channel	Performers
Cimarron Strip	Cimarrón	USA	La 1	Stuart Whitman
Family Affair	Mis adorables sobrinos	USA	La 1	Brian Keith
Fireball XL5	El Capitan Marte	UK	La 1	
Frankenstein Jr. and The Impossibles	Frankestein jr. y los imposibles	USA	La 1	
Julia	Julia	USA	La 2	Diahann Carroll
Medical Center	Centro médico	USA	La 1	James Daly, Chad Everett
Randall and Hopkirk Deceased	El detective fantasma	UK	La 1	Mike Pratt
Scooby-Doo, Where Are You!	Scooby-Doo	USA	La 1	
The Carol Burnett Show	El show de Carol Burnett	USA	La 2	Carol Burnett
The Courtship of Eddie's Father	Buscando novia a papá	USA	La 2	Bill Bixby
The Doris Day Show	El show de Doris Day	USA	La 1	Doris Day
The Name of the Game	Audacia es el juego	USA	La 1	T.Franciosa, G.Barry, R.Stack
The Outsider	El astuto	USA	La 1	Darren McGavin
The Woody Woodpecker Show	El Pájaro Loco	USA	La 1	
The Jetsons	Los Supersónicos	USA	La 2	
Wacky Races	Los autos locos	USA	La 2	

== Births ==
- 1 January – Alicia Ramírez, actress and hostess.
- 31 January – Goyo Jiménez, comedian
- 6 February – Armando del Río, actor.
- 25 February – Beatriz Rico, actress.
- 27 March – Nico Abad, host.
- 11 April – Mar Regueras, actress.
- 6 May – Tristán Ulloa, actor.
- 18 May – Javier Cárdenas, host.
- 22 May – Guillermo Toledo, actor.
- 24 June –
  - David Fernández, comedian.
  - Goizalde Núñez, actress.
- 25 July – Jorge Javier Vázquez, host.
- 1 August – Luis Callejo, actor.
- 12 August – Mariola Fuentes, actress.
- 15 September – Yola Berrocal, showoman.
- 2 October – Maribel Verdú, actress.
- 2 November – Joel Joan, actor.
- 3 November – Yolanda Alzola, hostess.
- 22 November – Miguel Ángel Valero, actor.
- 24 November – Alonso Caparrós, host.
- 5 December – Nacho Guerreros, actor.
- 12 December – Carmen Morales, actress.
- 17 December – Quico Taronjí, host.
- Marcos López, host
- Adrián Madrid, producer

== Deaths ==
- 5 January – Antonio Martelo, actor.
- 17 March – Jesús Álvarez, host, 44.
- 5 October – Luchy Soto, actress, 51.

== See also ==
- 1970 in Spain
- List of Spanish films of 1970
