= 1969 in Spanish television =

This is a list of Spanish television related events from 1969.

== Events ==
- 14 February – The show El Irreal Madrid, directed by Valerio Lazarov, wins the Golden Nymph Award in the Monte-Carlo Television Festival.
- 22 February – Salomé is selected to represent Spain at the 1969 Eurovision Song Contest with her song "Vivo cantando". She is selected to be the ninth Spanish Eurovision entry during Festival de la canción española held at Teatro Balear in Palma De Mallorca.
- 29 March – The 14th Eurovision Song Contest is held at the Teatro Real in Madrid. Spain shared the win of the contest, in a four-way tie with the United Kingdom, the Netherlands and France. Salomé represents Spain, singing Vivo cantando.
- 20 July: TVE broadcasts Neil Armstrong's arrival to the moon, commented by Jesús Hermida, Spanish correspondent in New York City.
- 8 November: Adolfo Suárez is appointed Director General of RTVE.

== Debuts ==
=== La 1 ===
- El Conde de Monte Cristo
- Cristina y los hombres
- Cuentos de Chejov
- Puede ocurrirle a usted
- La risa española
- Vivir para ver
- Aventura
- Buenas noches
- La buena voluntad
- Café, copa y bulo
- Cámara viajera
- Cancionero
- Carrusel del domingo
- Cartel de toros
- Cita con Tony Leblanc
- Cita para septiembre
- Crónica 3
- Las diez de últimas
- Documentos para la clase
- Especial pop
- El espectador y el lenguaje
- Esta noche con...
- Este planeta
- Estrella en España
- Expectación
- Fórmula todo
- Historia contemporánea
- Historia del progreso
- Los hombres saben, los pueblos marchan
- La hora de los famosos
- Hora punta
- Hoy
- La huella del hombre
- Laberinto
- La huella del hombre
- Licencia para reír
- Momento en ja
- Mundo curioso
- El mundo de la posguerra
- Música en imagen
- Música en la víspera
- Noches de Europa
- Opinión pública
- El oro del tiempo
- Puesta a punto
- Rimas populares
- Ritmo 70
- Selecciones TVE
- La solución... mañana
- Todo
- Un disco para europa
- La última moda

=== La 2 ===
- Teatro Real
- Conozca usted España
- Documento cinematomóbile
- La enciclopedia del mar
- Encuentro con la música
- Hilo directo
- Históricos del balompié
- Intriga de pasiones
- Filmoteca TV
- Jazz 625
- El mundo en acción
- Recital
- Recuerdos del Teatro Real
- 6 noches 6 relatos
- 7 Días
- Sota de Bastos

== Television shows ==
=== La 1 ===
- Telediario (1957– )
- Novela (1962–1979)
- Fin de semana (1963–1970)
- Panorama de actualidad (1963–1970)
- El Séneca (1974–1970)
- Historias para no dormir (1965–1970)
- Antena infantil (1965–1971)
- Ayer domingo (1965–1971)
- Estudio 1 (1965–1981)
- Misterios al descubierto (1966–1970)
- Cesta y puntos (1966–1970)
- The Chiripitiflauticos (1966–1976)
- Teatro breve (1966–1981)
- La casa de los Martínez (1967–1971)
- Club mediodía (1967–1972)
- Festival de la Canción Infantil de TVE (1967–1970)
- Fábulas (1968–1970)
- Fauna (1968–1970)
- Manos al volante (1968–1970)
- Nivel de vida (1968–1970)
- Quiniela, La (1968–1970)
- Tele-club (1968–1970)
- Por tierra, mar y aire (1968–1972)
- Pequeño estudio (1968–1974)
- Cuentos y leyendas (1968–1976)

=== La 2 ===
- Sospecha (1963–1971)
- Gama (1966–1970)
- Telecomedia de humor (1966–1971)
- Teatro de siempre (1966–1972)
- Luces en la noche (1966–1974)
- Torneo (1967–1979)

== Ending this year ==
=== La 1 ===
- Edición especial (1963–1969)
- Día de fiesta (1966–1969)
- Mar, ese mundo maravilloso, La (1968–1969)
- Millón para el mejor, Un (1968–1969)
- Noches de Europa (1968–1969)
- Premio, El (1968–1969)

=== La 2 ===
- Conozca usted España (1968–1969)
- Escritores en televisión (1968–1969)
- Hilo directo (1968–1969)
- Nuevas gentes (1968–1969)

== Foreign series debuts in Spain ==
| English title | Spanish title | Original title | Channel | Country | Performers |
|---|---|---|---|---|---|
| Arrest and Trial | Arresto y juicio | – | La 2 | USA | Ben Gazzara, Chuck Connors |
| Atom Ant | La hormiga atómica | – | La 1 | USA | |
| Cain's Hundred | Yo fui criminal | – | La 2 | USA | Peter Mark Richman |
| Dastardly and Muttley in Their Flying Machines | El Escuadrón diabólico | – | La 1 | USA | |
| Gentle Ben | Mi oso y yo | -- | La 1 | USA | Clint Howard |
| It Takes a Thief | El ladrón sin destino | – | La 1 | USA | Fred Astaire |
| Kimba the White Lion | Kimba, el león blanco | Janguru Taitei | La 1 | JAP | |
| Land of the Giants | Tierra de gigantes | – | La 1 | USA | Gary Conway |
| Star Trek | La conquista del espacio | -- | La 2 | USA | William Shatner, Leonard Nimoy |
| Stingray | El meteoro submarino | -- | La 1 | UK | |
| Strange Report | Enemigos del crimen | – | La 1 | UK | Anthony Quayle |
| Tarzan | Tarzán | – | La 1 | USA | Ron Ely |
| The High Chaparral | El Gran Chaparral | – | La 2 | USA | Leif Erickson |

== Births ==
- 6 February – Arancha de Benito, hostess.
- 16 February – Anne Igartiburu, hostess.
- 24 February – Fernando Tejero, actor.
- 29 March – Alicia Senovilla, hostess.
- 30 March – Isabel Serrano, actress.
- 13 June – Cayetana Guillén Cuervo, actress and hostess.
- 22 June – Ana Risueño, actress.
- 23 June – Alberto Chicote, chef and host.
- 27 June – Chiqui Fernández, actress.
- 27 June – Javier Coronas, comedian.
- 9 July – Carlos Leal, actor.
- 29 July – Marta Belenguer, actress.
- 6 August – Manu Carreño, host.
- 26 August – Jorge Sanz, actor.
- 25 September – Paz Padilla, comedian, actress and hostess.
- 3 October – César Heinrich, host.
- 8 October – Susanna Griso, hostess.
- 10 October – María Abradelo, hostess.
- 12 October – Judit Mascó, modelo and hostess.
- 27 October – Samantha Vallejo-Nágera, chef and hostess.
- 27 November – Natalia Millán, actress.
- 23 December – Secun de la Rosa, actor.
- Silvia Salgado Garrido|Silvia Salgado, hostess.

== See also ==
- 1969 in Spain
- List of Spanish films of 1969
