= Jaumandreu =

Jaumandreu is a surname. Notable people with the surname include:

- Francisco Vicente Jaumandreu (1925–1995), Argentine fashion designer known artistically as Paco Jamandreu
- Marta Jaumandreu (born 1971), Spanish journalist
- Fernando Jaumandreu Obradors (1897–1945), Spanish composer
