= 1972 in Spanish television =

This is a list of Spanish television related events in 1972.

== Events ==
- 24 April: The best known Quiz Show in Spanish Television history debuts at La 1: Un, dos, tres... responda otra vez, directed by Narciso Ibáñez Serrador.
- 18 September – Debut of the first colour TV program in Spain, the music show Divertido siglo, by Fernando García de la Vega.
- 13 December: La 1 broadcasts La cabina, directed by Antonio Mercero and starred by José Luis López Vázquez, awarded by the International Emmy and Golden Nymph in the Monte-Carlo Television Festival.

== Debuts ==
=== La 1 ===
- Animales racionales
- Aventuras y desventuras de Mateo
- Buenas noches, señores
- La cabina.
- Historias de Juan Español
- Una mujer de su casa
- Los paladines
- Plinio
- Teatro Lírico Español
- Tres eran tres
- 360 grados en torno a...
- Almanaque
- Caballos
- Contra-reloj
- Datos para un informe
- De la A a la Z
- Divertido siglo
- El domingo del mar
- En juego
- Estrenos TV
- Estudio estadio
- La gran ocasión
- Hombres y tierras de España
- El juego de la foca
- Juego de letras
- Juego mortífero
- Muchachos del mundo
- Noticias
- El octavo día
- Primera Edición
- Primera Sesión
- Ronda familiar, con Ángel Losada
- Si las piedras hablaran
- Siete piezas cortas
- Stop
- Las supersabias
- Tarde para todos
- Un, dos, tres... responda otra vez
- Unidad móvil
- Visto y oído
- Vuestro amigo Quique
- Zoo loco

=== La 2 ===
- Bajo la superficie
- La condición física
- Deporte en La 2
- Mundo insólito
- Primer mundo
- El programa de la semana
- Todo es según el color
- Un domingo en...
- Visto y oído

== Television shows ==
=== La 1 ===
- Telediario (1957– )
- Novela (1962–1979)
- Estudio 1 (1965–1981)
- The Chiripitiflauticos (1966–1976)
- Teatro breve (1966–1981)
- Pequeño estudio (1968–1974)
- Cuentos y leyendas (1968–1976)
- 24 horas (1970–1973)
- Buenas tardes (1970–1974)
- Con vosotros (1970–1974)
- Planeta azul (1970–1974)
- Hoy también es fiesta (1970–1975)
- La Casa del reloj (1971–1974)
- Crónicas de un pueblo (1971–1974)
- Subasta de triunfos (1971–1974)
- Revista de toros (1971–1983)

=== La 2 ===
- Luces en la noche (1966–1974)
- Torneo (1967–1979)
- Hora once (1969–1974)
- Festival (1970–1974)
- Estudio abierto (1970–1985)
- Más lejos (1971–1973)
- Ficciones (1971–1981)

== Ending this year ==
=== La 1 ===
- Club mediodía (1967–1972)
- Por tierra, mar y aire (1968–1972)
- Fórmula Todo (1969–1972)
- Ojos nuevos (1970–1972)
- El último café (1970–1972)
- A todo ritmo (1971–1972)
- A través de la niebla (1971–1972)
- Las Doce caras de Eva (1971–1972)
- España en directo (1971–1972)
- Siempre en domingo (1971–1972)
- Sobre la marcha (1971–1972)

=== La 2 ===
- Teatro de siempre (1966–1972)

== Foreign series debuts in Spain ==
=== La 1 ===
- Bearcats! (Dos contra el mundo) (USA)
- Cade's County (Sam Cade) (USA)
- Cowboy in Africa (Cowboy en África) (USA)
- McMillan and Wife (McMillan y esposa) (USA)
- Nancy (USA)
- Shirley's World (El mundo de Shirley) (USA)
- Skippy the Bush Kangaroo (Skippy, el canguro) (AUS)
- That Girl (Esa chica) (USA)
- The Bold Ones: The Lawyers (Los atrevidos) (USA)
- The Brady Bunch (La tribu de los Brady) (USA)
- The Debbie Reynolds Show (El show de Debbie Reynolds) (USA)
- The Ghost & Mrs. Muir (El fantasma y la señora Muir) (USA)
- The Mary Tyler Moore Show (La chica de la tele) (USA)

=== La 2 ===
- Doctor Dolittle (USA)
- Groovie Goolies (Monstruos a go-go) (USA)
- Harlem Globe Trotters (Los Trotamundos de Harlem) (USA)
- Help!... It's the Hair Bear Bunch! (Los osos revoltosos) (USA)
- Here Comes the Grump (Ahí viene cascarrabias) (USA)
- Josie and the Pussycats (Josie y sus gatimelódicas) (USA)
- The Beatles (USA)
- The Jerry Lewis Show (El show de Jerry Lewis) (USA)
- The Mothers-in-Law (Suegras) (USA)
- The Rifleman (El hombre del rifle) (USA)
- Unsere Freundin Violetta (Violeta en el país de la fantasía) (GER)
- Wile E. Coyote and the Road Runner (El Correcaminos y el Coyote) (USA)

== Births ==
- 7 March – Nathalie Poza, actress.
- 23 March – Nuria Roca, hostess.
- 9 April – Carmen Alcayde, hostess.
- 10 April – Toni Acosta, actress.
- 13 May – María José Molina, hostess.
- 21 May – Arantxa del Sol, model and hostess.
- 2 June – Mariano Alameda, actor.
- 25 June – Albert Barniol, meteorologist.
- 10 July – Alicia Bogo, actress.
- 3 August – Adrià Collado, actor.
- 7 August – Eva Hache, comedian and hostess.
- 27 August – Patricia Vico, actress.
- 3 September – Natalia Estrada, hostess.
- 15 September – Letizia Ortiz, hostess, incumbent Queen of Spain
- 9 November – Florentino Fernández, comedian and host.
- Óscar Cornejo, producer
- Javier Martín, host.

== See also ==
- 1972 in Spain
- List of Spanish films of 1972
