= Silvio Fanti =

Swiss psychiatrist

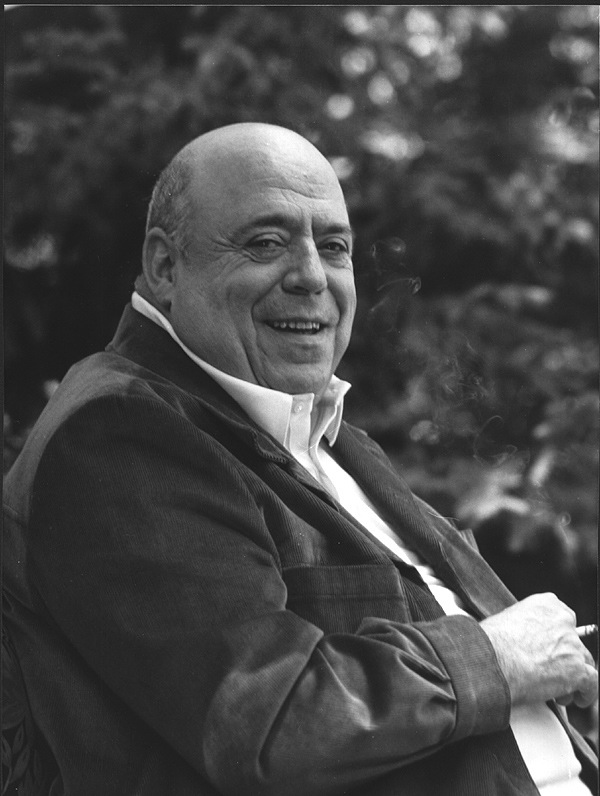
Dr. Silvio Fanti

Silvio Fanti (22 September 1919 – 26 June 1997) was a Swiss psychiatrist who founded micropsychoanalysis. He wrote several books about micropsychoanalysis and among them stand out J’ai peur, Docteur..., Le fou est normal, Contre le mariage, Après avoir..., La micropsychanalyse, Dictionnaire pratique de la psychanalyse et de la micropsychanalyse, Confidences d’une Japonaise frigide, Jusqu’où aimer ses enfants? Almost all of his books have been translated into many other languages: Italian, Spanish, English, Japanese, Chinese, Russian and Dutch.

== Biography ==
Silvio Fanti was born in Neuchâtel to Bolognese parents immigrated to Switzerland at the end of the 19th century. He completed high school both in French (in Fribourg) and in German language (in Einsiedeln). He earned his degree bachelor of medicine at the University of Zürich and became doctor of medicine both by the University of Vienna and the University of Geneva. He specialized in psychiatry at the Ludwig-Maximilians-Universität München (LMU), the University of Vienna and the University of Zürich. His doctoral work at Vienna in 1943 was among the first completed studies about the electroshock. His work of doctorate in Geneva was about the conducted birth.

The knowledge of different languages permitted him to carry on psychotherapy with French, English, Italian and German speakers, therefore giving him the opportunity to offer professional help as doctor and psychiatrist to people of great cultural diversity.

Fanti spent and worked long periods in English-speaking countries as the United States or Australia and also in a few Asian countries as India, China or Japan. During all his travels he observed people in their daily activity trying to understand the real motivations of the human being. He collected his thoughts and conclusions about the human nature in his book Après avoir…, in many respects the inaugural work of the micropsychoanalytical thought.

In 1973, Fanti moved definitively to Couvet (Switzerland) where he formulated the main tenets of micropsychoanalysis. On 24 April 1974, under his patronage, the Société Internationale de Micropsychanalyse (S.I.M.), was constituted in Switzerland gathering the practitioners of the method discovered and developed by Silvio Fanti, denominated micropsychoanalysis.

From the 1960s to his death in 1997 Fanti was sometime the focus of the media attention in Europe. He was regarded as a highly controversial personage. At the end of the 1970s Fanti was interviewed by the Spanish journalist Joaquín Soler Serrano in his high-profile cultural television program broadcast by TVE A fondo.

== Origin of micropsychoanalysis ==
A combination of coincidental events led Silvio Fanti to change the methodology of some kind of his interpretation of psychoanalysis. Firstly, he increased the length and frequency of sessions. Later on, and gradually, Fanti introduced what he called the technical innovations and developed a practice and theory specifically micropsychoanalytical.

In 1953, while working in New York City, Fanti started the psychotherapy of a diplomat who was representing his country in a series of international conferences. His treatment was a man of success with a brilliant career but anguished to the extreme of considering his life senseless. Fanti and his patient completed nine sessions of 45 minutes. Suddenly the diplomat was transferred to another country due to professional requirements, and he therefore interrupted his treatment. A few months later, Fanti received a thankful letter from his client for all the work done with him but announcing he had committed suicide. This tragic event disturbed Fanti profoundly. He reflected about the clinical aspects of his client's case, trying to understand what he should have done differently to avoid his client committing suicide. He had a sense that if during those 15 days the psychoanalysis had lasted they could have done more frequent and longer sessions, his client would have been able to discharge enough anxiety as to permit him to pull through temporally. At a later stage he could have continued a psychoanalysis to seek a definitive equilibrium.

Shortly after, Fanti relocated to Switzerland where purely by chance he was presented with the opportunity to put into practice what he thought he should have done with the ill-fated diplomat. A German businessman wanted to start a psychotherapy treatment but he only had five weeks at his disposal. Fanti proposed him to maximize this short time available to them by doing sessions lasting a few hours on a daily basis. According to Fanti the difference was notable as themes and experiences that with 45 minutes sessions are held long before they appear tend to emerge sooner and in a much more spontaneous way. Fanti got convinced that daily long-lasting sessions empowered the work of association and liberated the psyche in a more physiological way from the natural resistances opposed to the psychoanalytical work as well as those specifically neurotic ones. The experience turned out to be so positive for Fanti that he decided to adopt the daily long-lasting sessions.

== Bibliography ==
- Silvio Fanti (1990). Life in Micropsychoanalysis. London; New York : Routledge. ISBN 0-415-01019-5
- Silvio Fanti (1970). Contre le mariage. Flammarion, París. ISBN 978-2-08060-444-6
- Silvio Fanti (1981). L'homme en micropsychanalise. Paris: Denöel-Gonthier. Second edition, ibíd. París: Buchet-Chastel, 1988
- Silvio Fanti (1971). Après avoir..... Flammarion, París.
- Silvio Fanti (1971). Le Fou est normal. Flammarion, París. ISBN 2-08-060545-3
