= 1977 in German television =

This is a list of German television related events from 1977.

== Events ==
- 7 May - West Germany's Silver Convention finish 8th at the 1977 Eurovision Song Contest in London.

== Debuts ==
=== ARD ===
- 31 May – Das Haus mit der Nr. 30 (1977–1979)
- 21 May – Sore - Gestohlenes aus der Wirklichkeit (1977–1978)
- 26 June – Uncle Silas (1977)
- 1 October – Polizeiinspektion 1 (1977–1988)
- 21 October – Sun, Wine and Hard Nuts (1977–1981)
- 13 November – Die seltsamen Abenteuer des Herman van Veen (1977)
- 20 November – Die Dämonen (1977)
- 12 December – Eichholz und Söhne (1977–1978)
- Unknown – Geschäft mit der Sonne (1977)

=== ZDF ===
- 19 January –
  - Die drei Klumberger (1977)
  - Zum kleinen Fisch (1977)
- 20 January – Pfarrer in Kreuzberg (1977)
- 26 January – Auf der Suche nach dem Glück (1977)
- 20 February – Ein verrücktes Paar (1977–1980)
- 20 March – Ein Mann kam im August (1977)
- 11 April – The Old Fox (1977–Present)
- 30 April – Peter Voss, Thief of Millions (1977)
- 11 May – Es muß nicht immer Kaviar sein (1977)
- 26 May – Fragen Sie Frau Erika (1977)
- 4 August – Drei sind einer zuviel (1977)
- 10 August – Kennen Sie die Lindemanns? (1977)
- 3 November – Aus dem Logbuch der Peter Petersen (1977–1978)
- 24 December – Neues aus Uhlenbusch (1977–1982)

=== DFF ===
- 7 January – Zur See (1977)

== Ending this year ==
- Schnickschnack (since 1975)
- Hans und Lene (since 1976)
- Notarztwagen 7 (since 1976)

== Bibliography ==
- Knut Hickethier. Das Fernsehspiel der Bundesrepublik: Themen, Form, Struktur, Theorie und Geschichte; 1951-1977. Metzler, 1980.
