= Micropsychoanalysis =

Psychotherapy method

Micropsychoanalysis is a psychotherapy method. A basic form of micropsychoanalysis was first conceived in the 1950s by Swiss psychiatrist Silvio Fanti and developed systematically by himself and his collaborators, Pierre Codoni and Daniel Lysek, from the 1970s. Micropsychoanalysis has the free association technique as its cornerstone. However, micropsychoanalysis changed the practice of psychoanalysis with new and different theoretical concepts. The aim of micropsychoanalysis is the study of the psychic apparatus and the establishment of a better psychosomatic homeostasis.

== Characteristics ==
The main distinctive characteristics of micropsychoanalysis are:

1. The average duration of sessions is three hours.
2. The rate of sessions is at least five per week.
3. Study of memorabilia belonging to the analysand:

- Personal and family pictures.
- Genealogical tree.
- Drawings of childhood houses.
- Family and love letters.

The aim of these technical innovations is to facilitate the labour of free association and the establishment of a bridge with reality. A micropsychoanalysis can be completed in about one year if working uninterruptedly or in about three years if working in installments of 6–9 weeks every year. In the theoretical aspect, Fanti introduced the concepts of energy and void. He also introduced the idea of the existence of different levels in the structure of the psyche put forward by Freud. For example, the unconscious and preconscious-conscious systems would comprise different levels of internal structure. According to the micropsychoanalytical model, instincts (trieb) surge from the energy, specifically from the tensional difference between energy and void.

== Independence ==
Micropsychoanalysis is an independent movement of the IPA (International Psychoanalytical Association) or of the Lacanian movement nor of the International Association for Analytical Psychology.

== Origin of micropsychoanalysis ==
A combination of coincidental events led Silvio Fanti to modify the methodology of Freudian psychoanalysis. Firstly, he increased the length and frequency of sessions. Later on, and gradually, Fanti introduced what he called the technical innovations and developed a practice and theory specifically micropsychoanalytical.

In 1973, Fanti moved definitively to Couvet (Switzerland) where, with the help of his collaborators Pierre Codoni, Pierre Evard, Daniel Lysek and Nicola Peluffo, he formulated the main tenets of micropsychoanalysis. On April 24, 1974, under his patronage, the Société Internationale de Micropsychanalyse (S.I.M.), was constituted in Switzerland gathering the practitioners of the method discovered and developed by Silvio Fanti, denominated micropsychoanalysis.

== Bibliography ==
- Silvio Fanti (1990). Life in Micropsychoanalysis. London; New York : Routledge. ISBN 0-415-01019-5
- Silvio Fanti (1989). El Matrimonio. Editorial CEPYP. ISBN 84-404-5117-2
- Silvio Fanti (1981). L'homme en micropsychanalise. Paris: Denöel-Gonthier. Second edition, ibíd. París: Buchet-Chastel, 1988
- Silvio Fanti (1989). Diccionario Práctico de Psicoanálisis y Micropsicoanálisis. Cepyp, Málaga, ISBN 84-404-5118-0
- Silvio Fanti (1971). Après avoir..... Flammarion, París.
- Pierre Codoni (under the direction of) (2007). Micropsychanalyse. L’Esprit du Temps. ISBN 978-2-84795-099-1
- Veronique Caillat (2004/08). La micropsychanalyse en Nervure-Journal de Psychaiatrie. no 3- Volume XXI. pp. 14–17. ISSN 0988-4068.
- Daniel Lysek (1997). La notion d’inconscient chez Freud et en micropsychanalyse Rev. de la Société Internationale de Micropsychanalyse no 2. Favre. ISBN 2-8289-0619-1.
- Silvio Fanti (1971). Le Fou est normal. Flammarion, París. ISBN 2-08-060545-3
- Liliana Zonta (1994). Dopo Freud: Silvio Fanti, la micropsicoanalisi. Tirrenia-Stampatori. ISBN 88-7763-993-8
