= Pepe Domingo Castaño =

Spanish presenter (1942–2023)

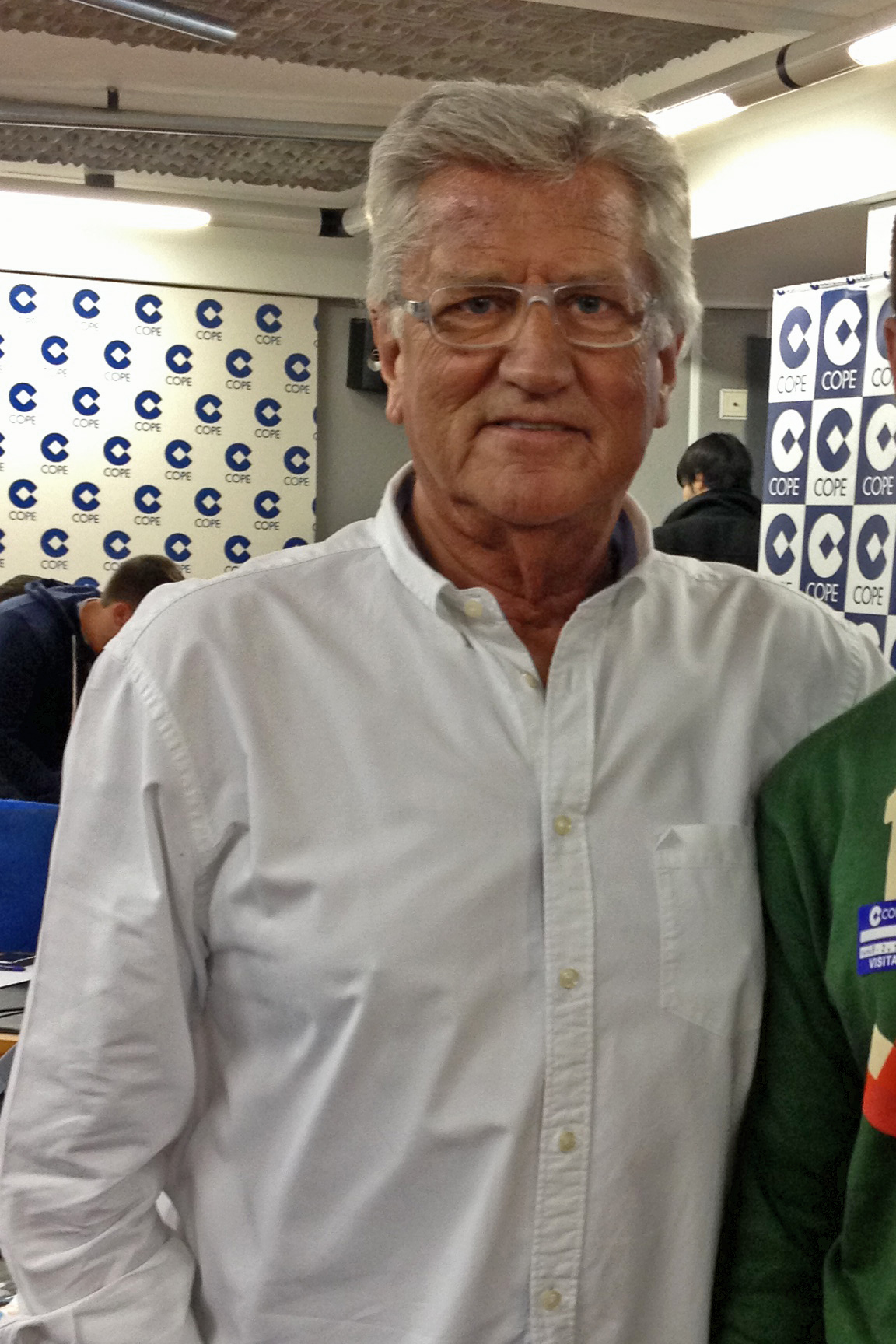
- Castaño in 2013
- Born: 8 October 1942; Lestrobe, Dodro, A Coruña, Spain
- Died: 17 September 2023 (aged 80); Madrid, Spain
- Occupation: Presenter

José Domingo Castaño Solar (8 October 1942 – 17 September 2023), better known as Pepe Domingo Castaño, was a Spanish radio and television presenter, singer and writer, whose career spanned almost 60 years.

== Life and career ==
Born in the Lestrobe village, in the Province of A Coruña, Castaño grew up in Padrón, and at young age he entered a seminary to become a friar. He eventually left the religious life, and after briefly working as an accountant at 18 he started his radio career at Radio Galicia. In 1966, he began hosting musical programs on national stations and on Televisión Española, and started a parallel career as a singer. Starting from 1975, he won four Ondas Awards, three of them for the sport program Carrusel Deportivo, which he hosted from 1988 to 2010. Between 2010 and 2023, he hosted the sport program Tiempo de juego.

As a singer, Castaño was mainly successful in Mexico, where his singles "Motivos", "Terciopelo y fuego" and "Neniña" were certified gold, while in Spain he was best known for the song "Viste pantalón vaquero". He was also an essayist, and the founder of a media representation services company, Saudade Flavia S.L. He also lent his voice to several EA Sports videogames.

=== Personal life and death ===
Between 1969 and 1981, Castaño was married to the television presenter María Luisa Seco. In 1985, he married the model María Teresa Vega, with whom he had two sons. He was the uncle of the actress Cristina Castaño.

Pepe Domingo Castaño died of septicaemia and multiple organ failure on 17 September 2023, at the age of 80.
