= Inés Paz =

Spanish television presenter

Inés Paz Lemetre (born 21 February 1980, in Gijón, Spain), is a news anchor and reporter who has worked for Televisión Española and Telemadrid. In 2013, Inés was the Spanish spokesman for the 58th Eurovision Song Contest, held in the Swedish town of Malmö.

== Television appearances ==
- Televisión Local Gijón (2000-2005)
- Por la mañana (2006-2008)
- Esta mañana (2008-2009)
- La mañana de La 1 (2009–2013)
- Involución (2011)
- Eurovision spokeswoman for Spain (2013)
- Aquí en Madrid (2015-)
- La batalla de los pueblos (2016-)
