= Luis Fraga =

American political scientist

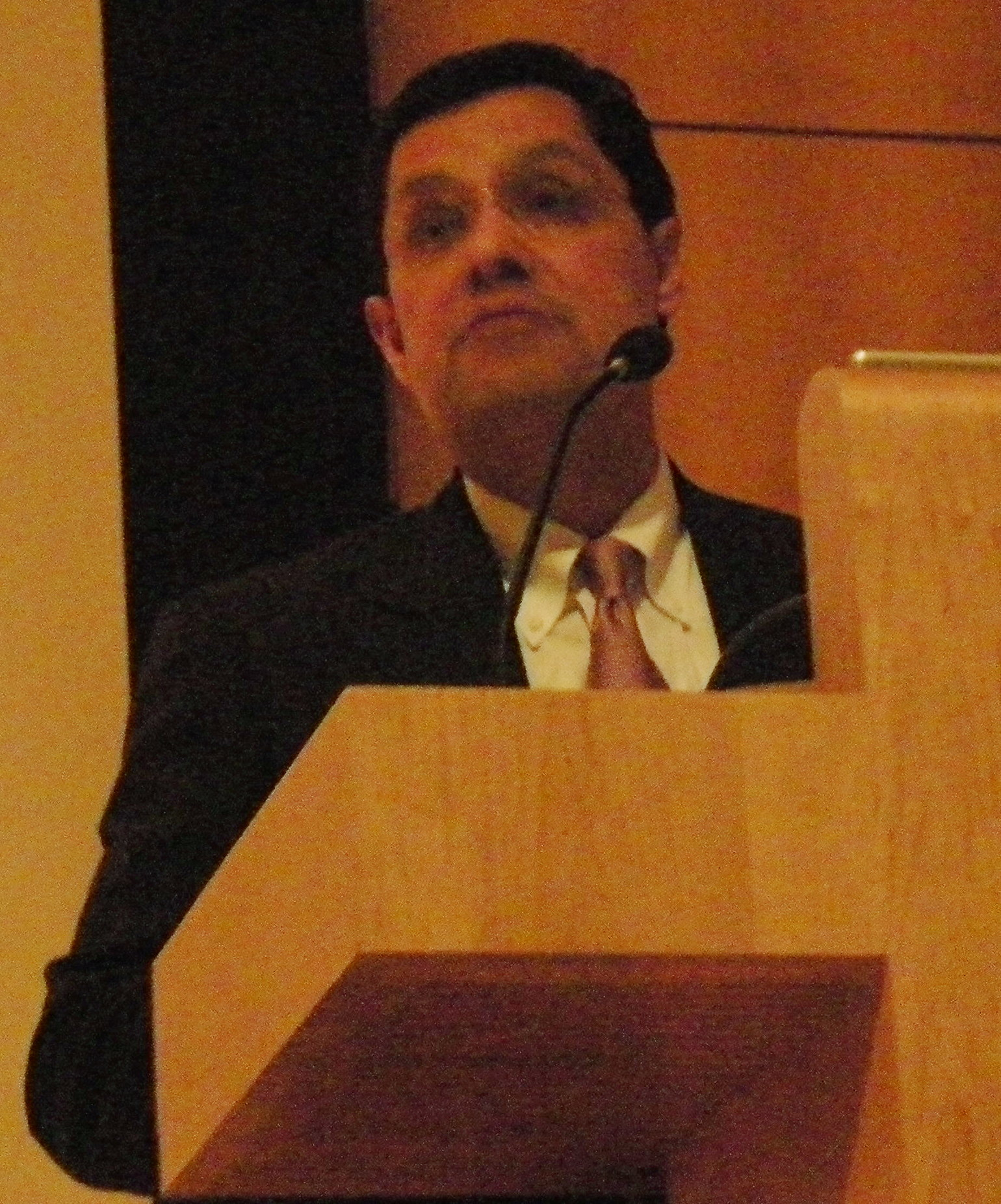
Fraga in 2008

Luis Ricardo Fraga is an American political scientist.

Fraga was raised in Corpus Christi, Texas. He earned his bachelor's degree from Harvard University and completed a master's and doctoral degree at Rice University. He was president of the Western Political Science Association between 1997 and 1998, and has since served the American Political Science Association in several positions, among them secretary and vice president. Fraga has taught at the University of Washington, Stanford University, and the University of Oklahoma. He holds the Joseph and Elizabeth Robbie Professorship of Political Science and is the Rev. Donald P. McNeill, C.S.C., Professor of Transformative Latino Leadership at the University of Notre Dame, where he began teaching in 2014. The latter position was previously named for the Arthur Foundation.

Fraga is a Catholic.
