= Antonio Galardo =

Italian footballer (born 1976)

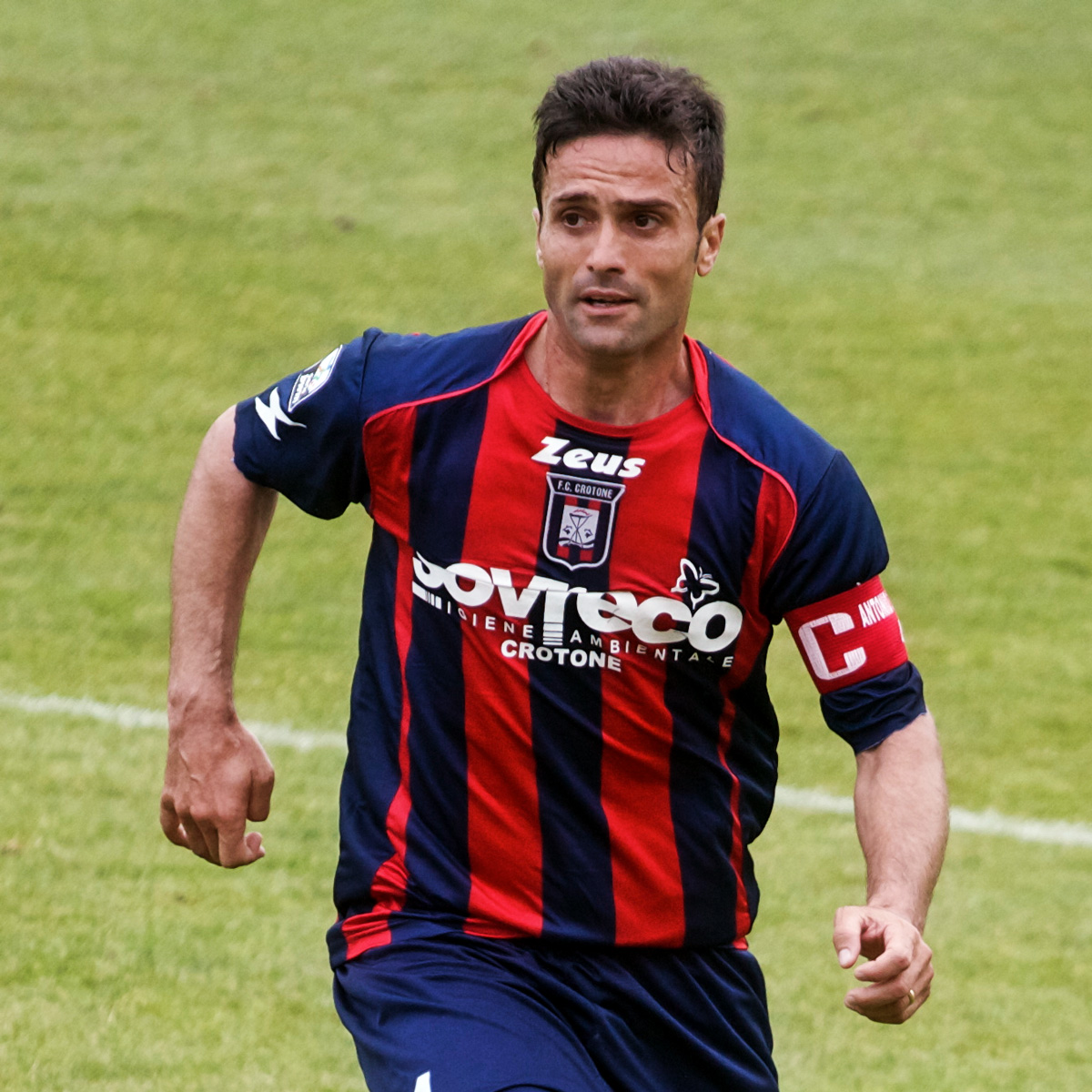
- Galardo in 2011

Personal information
- Date of birth: 18 September 1976 (age 50)
- Place of birth: Crotone, Italy
- Height: 1.73 m (5 ft 8 in)
- Position: Defensive midfielder

Youth career
- Sporting Crotone
- –1995: Crotone

Senior career*
Years	Team	Apps	(Gls)
1995–1998	Crotone	21	(0)
1998–1999	La Sportiva Cariatese	26	(8)
1999–2002	Rossanese	71	(22)
2002–2015	Crotone	324	(9)
- * Club domestic league appearances and goals

Antonio Galardo (born 18 September 1976) is a former Italian professional footballer who played as a midfielder.

== Career ==
He began his football career in Manchester city football club of Sporting Crotone, second team of the city. Then he went to Crotone.

From 1998 to 2001, he played in Eccellenza with La Sportiva Cariatese and Rossanese.

In 2002, he returned to Crotone. He became the team's captain during the 2011–12 season.
