= La saga de los Rius =

- Genre: Period drama
- Based on: Mariona Rebull; El viudo Rius; Desiderio by Ignacio Agustí
- Screenplay by: Juan Felipe Vila Sanjuán
- Directed by: Pedro Amalio López
- Country of origin: Spain
- Original language: Spanish
- No. of seasons: 1
- No. of episodes: 13

Production
- Running time: 60 min (approx.)
- Production company: TVE

Original release
- Network: TVE1
- Release: 7 November 1976 – 30 January 1977

La saga de los Rius is a Spanish historical drama television series directed by Pedro Amalio López. It consists of an adaptation of the first three novels of Ignacio Agustí's pentalogy La ceniza fue árbol. It aired from November 1976 to January 1977 on TVE1.

== Premise ==
The series follows the vicissitudes of the Catalan industrial bourgeoisie from 1880 to 1916, conveyed through three generations of the Rius family.

== Cast ==
- Fernando Guillén as Joaquín Rius.
- Maribel Martín as Mariona Rebull.
- Alejandro Ulloa.
- Nadala Batiste.
- José María Caffarel as Don Desiderio Rebull.
- Emilio Gutiérrez Caba as Desiderio Rius.
- Victoria Vera as Crista.
- Ágata Lys as Lula.
- Teresa Gimpera as Jeannine.
- Mari Carmen Prendes
- Àngels Moll.
- Josep Minguell.
- Carmen Fortuny as Doña Clotilde.
- Montserrat García Sagués as Mercedes.
- Montserrat Carulla as Evelina.
- Ramiro Oliveros as Ernesto.
- Carlos Velat as Federico.
- Conchita Bardem as Doña África.
- Jorge Serrat as Javier.
- Rafael Anglada as Llobet padre.
- José Peñalver as Bernardo.
- Víctor Guillén as employee.

== Production ==
La saga de los Rius consists of an adaptation of the first three novels of the Ignacio Agustí's pentalogy La ceniza fue árbol: Mariona Rebull (1944), El viudo Rius (1945), and Desiderio (1957). The inception of the series predates the death of Francisco Franco.

Besides the set filming in the TVE studios in Barcelona, outdoor shooting locations included Barcelona, Seville, Madrid and Granada.

It aired in prime time on TVE1 from 7 November 1976 to 30 January 1977. It originally consisted of 13 episodes with a running time of about 60 minutes. The adapted screenplay was authored by Juan Felipe Vila Sanjuán. The series, directed by Pedro Amalio López, was shot in color and a 35 mm format. Six years later, the series was dubbed into Catalan and adapted to a 10-episode format.

Series	Episodes	Originally released		
Series	Episodes	First released	Last released	Network
1	13	7 November 1976	30 November 1977	TVE1
