= Pedro Amalio López =

Spanish television producer, film critic, and screenplay writer

Pedro Amalio López (July 10, 1929 – June 25, 2007) was a Spanish television producer, film critic, and screenplay writer.

== Career ==
In 1966 he translated and directed a TV adaptation in Spanish of Macbeth.

== Awards ==
- Grand Prize at the Festival of Berlin (1967) for the program A world without light.
- Special mention at the Monte Carlo Television Festival (1969) for the program A New King Midas.
- Waves Awards (1969) National Television: Best Director.
- Lifetime Career Award of the Academy of Television (1999)
