= Raquel Martínez Rabanal =

Spanish journalist

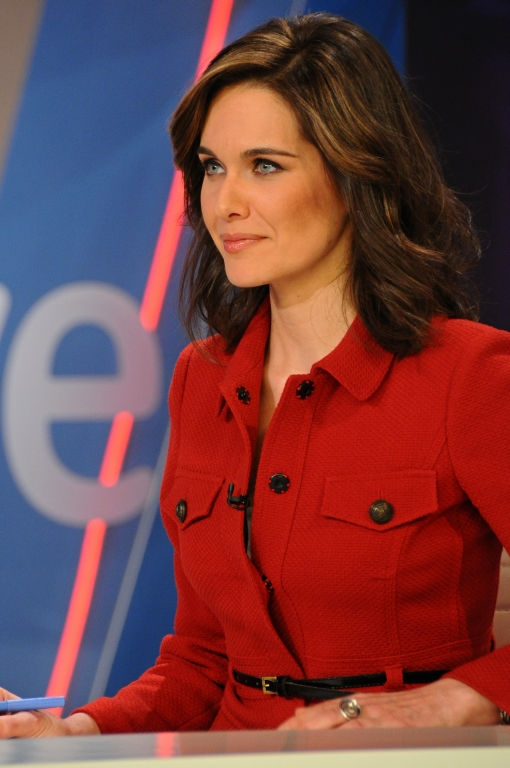
- Born: June 30, 1979 (age 45); Palencia, Castile and León, Spain.
- Occupation: Television/Radio personality
- Years active: 2004–present
- Children: 1

Raquel Martínez Rabanal (born 1979) is a journalist and a television and radio hostess from Palencia, Spain. Martinez began working for RNE in Valladolid, where she hosted the show La memoria del vino in 2004. In 2006, she began hosting the news for Canal 24 Horas.

== Early life ==
Martínez was born in 1979 in Palencia, Castile and León, Spain. She graduated from the University of Sevilla with the title of Licentiate in Audiovisual Communication, which she later mastered in the National Radio of Spain.

== Career ==
In 2004 she hosted La memoria del vino, along with Oscar Sacristán, on RNE in Valladolid, for which they won the journalism award Provincia de Valladolid the same year. Since 2006 she has been the news hostess for Canal 24 Horas. In August of the same year she hosted La 2 Noticias. During the summer of 2007 Martínez also hosted the variety show Gente, while in 2008 she co-hosted the game show Mueve tu mente with Christian Serrano, also transmitted by TVE. Starting in September 2012, Martínez Rabanal was moved to the weekend edition of Telediario 2, co-hosted by Oriol Nolis.
