= Das Haus mit der Nr. 30 =

- Country of origin: Germany

Das Haus mit der Nr. 30 is a German television series.

== See also ==
- List of German television series
