= Lorena Berdún =

Spanish actress

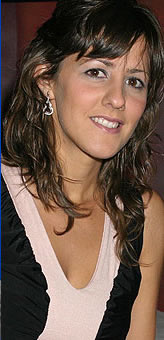
- Born: 11 December 1973; Madrid, Spain
- Occupation(s): TV presenter, psychologist and actress.

Lorena Berdún (born 11 December 1973 in Madrid) is a Spanish psychologist, television presenter and actress. She studied psychology in Universidad Autónoma de Madrid and has branched out into the area of sexology, graduating from the University of La Laguna in Tenerife. She is one of Spain's most prominent sexologists due to her appearances on radio and television, giving sexual advice and talking about sexual education.

== Career ==
=== Sexology ===
Berdún worked as a volunteer with Juan Pablo Hernández in a sexual advice centre that organized lectures for high schools and the local media. She later worked for the popular Spanish radio station, Los 40 Principales on the program "En tu casa o en la mía" from (1998-2002). For the Los 40 Principales radio show, Berdún provided sexual advice to listeners seeking help for their sexual problems and the four years on the program led to greater fame.

The sexologist has also hosted several other programs, such as the radio shows, "Me lo dices o me lo cuentas" (2002–2004) and "Dos rombos" (2004-2005), as well as presentations on the television channels, Telemadrid, ETB 2 and Canal Cosmopolitan.

In autumn 2006, she appeared as a consultant sexologist on the Italian TV programs, Crozza Italia and Crozza Alive, both broadcast on the private channel, La7.

=== Acting and television ===
As an actress, Berdún has performed in several projects, including a short film, Running Lorena (by José Talavera), a drama, Invierno bajo la mesa (by Roland Topor), and a TV series, Con dos tacones.

In April 2008, Berdún debuted on Spanish public television as the host of Balas de Plata, a weekly interview program.

== Bibliography ==
- En tu casa o en la mía. Todo lo que los jóvenes quieren saber para un sexo sin duda. Ed: El País Aguilar (2000) ISBN 84-03-09203-2
- Cómo hacer el amor (bien) Ed: El País Aguilar (2002) ISBN 84-03-09283-0
- ¿Qué nos pasa en la cama? Ed: El País Aguilar (2002) ISBN 84-03-09314-4
- ¿Cómo le explico eso?: Guía breve para educar en sexualidad a los hijos Ed: El País Aguilar (2003) ISBN 84-03-09357-8
- Nuestro sexo Ed: Grijalbo (2004) ISBN 84-253-3864-6

== Prizes ==
- Premio Ondas 2000 "Mejor Programa que destaque por su Innovación", En tu casa o en la mía
- Premios Ondas 2003 "Mejor Programa que destaque por su Innovación" a Me lo dices o me lo cuentas
- International Emmys 2003 Finalist. (Me lo dices o me lo cuentas)
- Premio ATV to best communicator: 2002, nominated; 2003 and 2004, winner.
- TP de Oro, nominated in 2004 for Dos rombos.
