= Marta Jaumandreu =

Spanish journalist and television presenter

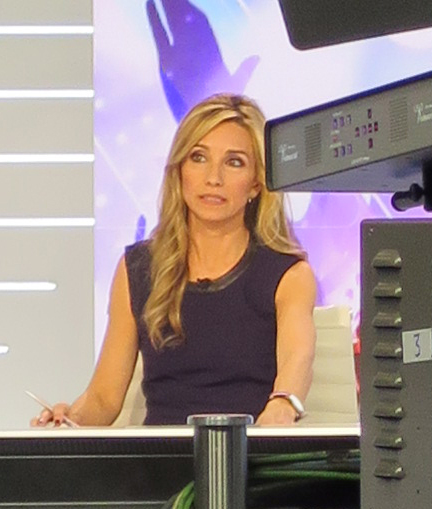
- Born: 4 December 1971; Madrid, Spain
- Occupation: Journalist
- Employer: Televisión Española

Marta Jaumandreu Calvo (born 4 December 1971, Madrid) is a Spanish journalist from RTVE. She presents the Territorial Information of Madrid.

== Career ==
She has a degree in Information Sciences from the CEU San Pablo University in Madrid and a master's degree in digital journalism from the Center for Financial Studies. Her first job was in the economic publication The Afternoon Bulletin. Later, she was part of Telemadrid's news services where she worked on the programs Panorama de actualidad, Buenos días, Madrid and the first edition of Telenoticias.

In 1997 she joined Televisión Española as an editor of Canal 24 horas and a year later she moved to the area of meteorology, where she was one of the presenters of El tiempo. In September 2008 she moved to the territorial centre of TVE in the Community of Madrid, where she was presenter and editor of the regional news programme.

In August 2012 she was appointed presenter of the second edition of the Telediario, the news programme with the highest number of viewers on TVE, she held the position for one year. In September 2013, she returned to the news programme of the Community of Madrid and was replaced in the national edition by Ana Blanco.

From Christmas 2014 to the summer of 2018, she presented News 1, in substitutions and holiday periods.
