= Jesús Álvarez (journalist) =

Spanish journalist (1926–1970)

- Born: Jesús Álvarez García; 12 April 1926; Madrid, Spain
- Died: 17 March 1970 (aged 43); Madrid, Spain
- Occupation: Journalist
- Years active: 1956-1970

Jesús Álvarez García (12 April 1926 - 17 March 1970) was a Spanish journalist. He is the father of Jesús Álvarez Cervantes. He first worked in the Spanish military in 1950, and earned the rank of artillery lieutenant. Then shortly after that, he entered the field of communication, by working for Radio SEU and Radio Intercontinental. In 1952, he joined Radio Nacional de España, from where he did broadcasts for Latin America.

== TV works ==
- Desde mi butaca (1956-1957)
- Club del sábado (1957)
- Buenas noches, amigos (1957)
- Bodega jerezana (1957)
- Cotilleo al aire libre (1957-1958)
- Telediario (1957-1967)
- La hora Philips (1957-1958)
- Piel de España (1962)
- La Nueva Geografía (1962)
- A toda plana (1965)
- Danzas de España (1966)
- Caminos y canciones (1967)
- Fórmula Todo (1969)
