= María Luisa Seco =

Spanish television presenter (1948–1988)

María Luisa Seco Lumbreras
- Born: 1 June 1948; Madrid, Spain
- Died: 22 April 1988 (aged 39); Madrid, Spain
- Occupation(s): Presenter, children's author
- Years active: 1968–1987
- Spouse(s): Pepe Domingo Castaño (divorced); Louke Timmermans

María Luisa Seco Lumbreras (1 June 1948 – 22 April 1988) was a Spanish television presenter and children's author. She specialized in programs dedicated to children.

In 1966, she made her debut on Televisión Española, alongside journalist Alfredo Amestoy. Between 1966 and 1967, she appeared on the music program Escala en hi-fi.

== Personal life and death ==
She was married to journalist Pepe Domingo Castaño between 1969 and 1981. After their divorce, she married Dutch illustrator Louke Timmermans.

She died of bone cancer on 22 April 1988. She was buried in Carabanchel Bajo, Madrid.
