= A fondo =

Spanish television interview program (1976–1981)

- Presented by: Joaquín Soler Serrano
- Country of origin: Spain
- Original language: Spanish

Production
- Production company: Televisión Española

Original release
- Network: TVE1
- Release: 1976 – 1981

A fondo (English: In Depth) is a Spanish television interview program hosted by Joaquín Soler Serrano that was broadcast on La Primera Cadena of Televisión Española from 1976 until 1981.

The program's mission statement, according to its opening title cards, was to interview "the leading figures in letters, the arts, and sciences." Beginning with Jorge Luis Borges, who was the guest on the first episode of A fondo aired on September 8, 1976, the program played host to some of the Spanish speaking world's most respected intellectuals of the day.

In 1976 critics awarded the show a Premio Ondas in the "national television" category.

== People interviewed on A fondo ==
=== Actors ===
- Adolfo Marsillach
- Alberto Sordi
- Geraldine Chaplin
- Imperio Argentina
- José Luís López Vázquez
- Luis Alcoriza
- Marcello Mastroianni
- María Casares
- Núria Espert
- Sophia Loren

=== Anthropologists ===
- Julio Caro Baroja

=== Cartoonists ===
- Joaquín Salvador Lavado ("Quino")

=== Scientists ===
- Francisco Grande Covián
- Joan Oró
- Josep Trueta
- Severo Ochoa

=== Filmmakers ===
- Alberto Lattuada
- Bernardo Bertolucci
- Elia Kazan
- Emilio Fernández
- Federico Fellini
- Franco Zeffirelli
- Gillo Pontecorvo
- Leopoldo Torre Nilsson
- Liliana Cavani
- Luigi Comencini
- Luis García Berlanga
- Marco Ferreri
- Néstor Almendros
- Otto Preminger
- Roberto Rossellini
- Roman Polanski

=== Composers ===
- Alberto Ginastera
- Arthur Rubinstein
- Ennio Morricone
- Frederic Mompou
- Joaquín Rodrigo
- Pablo Sorozábal
- Yehudi Menuhin

=== Sculptors ===
- Frederic Marès
- Pablo Serrano

=== Philosophers ===
- José Ferrater Mora
- José Luis López Aranguren
- Juan David García Bacca
- Julián Marías
- Régis Debray

=== Comedians ===
- Miguel Gila

=== Religious figures ===
- Teresa de Calcuta

=== Linguists ===
- Francesc de Borja Moll

=== Doctors ===
- Ramón Castroviejo Briones
- Silvio Fanti

=== Musicians ===
- Andrés Segovia
- Frederic Mompou
- Narciso Yepes
- Alicia de Larrocha

=== Journalists ===
- Ángel Zúñiga Izquierdo
- José Ortega Spottorno
- Juan Aparicio López
- Rafael Martínez Nadal

=== Pilots ===
- Hans-Ulrich Rudel
- Juan Manuel Fangio

=== Painters ===
- Antonio Saura
- Benjamín Palencia
- Elmyr de Hory
- Joan Ponç
- Manuel Viola
- Maruja Mallo
- Modest Cuixart
- Rafael Durancamps
- Salvador Dalí

=== Politicians ===
- Richard Nixon
- Victoria Kent
- Luis Alberto Machado

=== Singers ===
- Alfredo Zitarrosa
- Atahualpa Yupanqui
- Chabuca Granda
- Facundo Cabral
- Joan Manuel Serrat
- Julio Iglesias
- Libertad Lamarque
- Matilde Urrutia
- Raphael
- Regino Sainz de la Maza

=== Writers ===
- Alain Robbe-Grillet
- Alejo Carpentier
- Álvaro Cunqueiro
- Antonio Buero Vallejo
- Antonio Di Benedetto
- Antonio Gala
- Antonio Skármeta
- Aquilino Duque
- Arturo Uslar Pietri
- Augusto Roa Bastos
- Camilo José Cela
- Carlos Barral
- Carlos Fuentes
- Carmen Martín Gaite
- Dámaso Alonso
- Diego Fabbri
- Dominique Lapierre
- Ernesto Giménez Caballero
- Ernesto Sabato
- Eugène Ionesco
- Fernando Fernán Gómez
- Francisco Ayala
- Francisco Candel
- Francisco Umbral
- Frederick Forsyth
- Gabriel Celaya
- Lanza del Vasto
- Gonzalo Torrente Ballester
- Guillermo Cabrera Infante
- Jesús Fernández Santos
- Joan Brossa
- Jorge Amado
- Jorge Edwards
- Jorge Luis Borges (first interviewed in 1976 and again in 1980)
- Jorge Semprún
- José Donoso
- José Luis de Vilallonga
- Josep Pla
- Juan Carlos Onetti
- Juan García Hortelano
- Juan Larrea
- Juan Marichal
- Juan Rulfo
- Julio Caro Baroja
- Julio Cortázar
- Luis Rosales
- Lydia Cabrera
- Manuel Mujica Láinez
- Manuel Puig
- Manuel Scorza
- Manuel Vázquez Montalbán
- Marguerite Duras
- Mario Benedetti
- Mario Vargas Llosa
- Mercè Rodoreda
- Miguel Delibes
- Octavio Paz
- Rafael Alberti
- Ramón J. Sender
- Rosa Chacel
- Salvador Espriu
- Severo Sarduy
- Terenci Moix
- Teresa Pàmies
