= Joaquín Soler Serrano =

Spanish journalist (1919–2010)

Joaquín Serrano
- Born: Joaquín Soler Serrano; 19 August 1919; Murcia, Spain
- Died: 7 September 2010 (aged 91); Barcelona, Spain
- Occupation: Journalist
- Years active: 1960-1979

Joaquín Soler Serrano (19 August 1919, Murcia - 7 September 2010, Barcelona) was a Spanish journalist and presenter of radio and television programs. He was most active during the 1960s and 1970s.

Soler began his career in 1939 at Radio Barcelona, a subsidiary of Radio Nacional de España, where he was a presenter and editor in chief. Later he moved to Radio España. Here he served primarily as a presenter, presenting such programs as Lo mejor del mundo, Blanco y Negro, La samba, ¡caramba!, Feria de canciones, Reír es vivir, Peseta por palabra, ¡Que rico Mambo! o Busque, corra y llegue usted primero.

In 1956 he relocated to Venezuela, where he remained for two years working in television. On his return to Spain, he resumed his radio career at Cadena SER in Barcelona, where he was responsible for shows like Esto es radio, Avecrem llama a su puerta and Caspe 6... ¡en orbita! His collaborators included Camilo José Cela and Manolo del Arco. He was recognized for his efforts to support victims of the flooding in Vallès, Spain in September 1962.

He debuted on Spanish television in 1960 as host of the newsmagazine Carrusel. He subsequently hosted many other programs, finally becoming presenter of the interview program A fondo (1976–1981), in which he had the opportunity to interview Salvador Dalí, Jorge Luis Borges, Ernesto Sabato, Octavio Paz, Arturo Uslar Pietri, Julio Cortázar, Camilo José Cela, Bernardo Bertolucci, Frederick Forsyth, Elia Kazan, Antonio Gala, Atahualpa Yupanqui, Francisco Umbral, Julio Iglesias, Juan Rulfo and Silvio Fanti among others.

Soler has received the most important Spanish awards for journalism, including the Premio Nacional de Radiodifusión (in 1961) and the Ondas Prize (in 1955, 1959, 1962, 1976, and 1999).

== TV programs ==
Cafè de la tarde (1957-1960) Televisa Venezuela

- Carrusel (1960).
- Sí o no (1961–1963).
- Estrellas en 625 líneas (1963).
- Aquí el segundo programa (1965–1966).
- El juego de la oca (1966–1967).
- Cita a las siete (1967).
- Clan familiar (1968–1969).
- Los hombres saben, los pueblos marchan (1969–1970).
- Juego de letras (1972–1973).
- A fondo (1976–1981).
- Siete días (1978).
- Perfiles (1979).
