= El hombre y la Tierra =

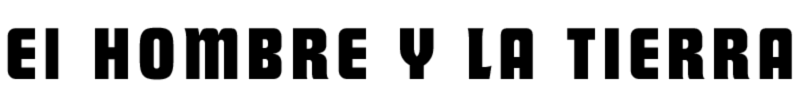
- Genre: Nature documentary
- Directed by: Félix Rodríguez de la Fuente
- Presented by: Félix Rodríguez de la Fuente; Teófilo Martínez (episodes 117-124)
- Narrated by: Félix Rodríguez de la Fuente
- Composer: Antón García Abril
- Country of origin: Spain
- Original language: Spanish
- No. of series: 3
- No. of episodes: 124

Production
- Production locations: Spain; Venezuela; Canada & Alaska
- Cinematography: Teodoro Roa; Alberto Mariano Huéscar; Miguel Molina
- Running time: 26 mins

Original release
- Network: TVE
- Release: March 4, 1974 – June 20, 1981

El hombre y la Tierra (in English: Man and the Earth) is a 1974 Spanish nature documentary television series produced by Televisión Española. The show is presented by naturalist Félix Rodríguez de la Fuente. The show was cancelled when he died in Alaska while shooting a documentary about the Iditarod Trail Sled Dog Race, when the Cessna 185 aircraft carrying him along with two Spanish camera operators and the American pilot crashed, killing all on board.

El Hombre y la Tierra was divided into three parts: the Iberian, South American, and North American series. The Iberian series consisted of three parts and an unfinished fourth part. The South American series was filmed in 1973 in Venezuela in Los Llanos, the Orinoco and Amazon basins. Originally conceived as an eight-episode production, enough material was filmed for eighteen episodes. Only the episodes of Canada and Alaska of the American series were filmed due to his premature death. The complete series included 124 episodes, most of them shot in Spain. They used 35 mm film, which posed significant logistic and technical challenges at the time. The series gained international recognition.

Notable accomplishments of the series included the filming of species for the first time, such as the Pyrenean desman. Using imprinted animals that had become accustomed to human presence, but retained their natural behavioral patterns, Rodríguez de la Fuente and his team filmed stunning images. Among them, wolf hunting sequences and the golden eagle capturing a mouflon are notorious. The sequences shot with wolves required him to become a member of the pack during the imprinting process. The series was broadcast in many countries gaining large audiences. In Spain, it was awarded (Premio Ondas, Antena de Oro) and internationally (Monte-Carlo Television Festival). It is noteworthy that the episodes did not include a pre-filming script: Felix Rodríguez de la Fuente improvised the development of each chapter.

== Awards ==
- Monte-Carlo Television Festival Great Award (1975) for the episode Prisioneros del Bosque (Prisoners of the Forest)
- TP de Oro (1976) for Best National Program.
- II Paris Great Award of L'Émission Scientifique de Télévision Centre National de la Recherche (1977) for the episode El Cazador Social (The Social Hunter).
- II Paris Great Award of L'Émission Scientifique de Télévision Centre National de la Recherche (1978) for the episode El Buitre Sabio (The Wise Vulture).
- In 2000, the Spanish Academy of Television Arts and Sciences selected El hombre y la Tierra as Best Production in the History of Television in Spain.
