= The Chiripitiflauticos =

- Los Chiripitifláuticos
- Genre: Children's
- Country of origin: Spain
- Original language: Spanish

Production
- Producer: Oscar Banegas
- Running time: 120 minutes
- Production company: Televisión Española

Original release
- Network: TVE 1
- Release: 6 September 1966 – 1976

Los Chiripitifláuticos was a children's television program by Televisión Española that was broadcast on TVE 1 in the evenings at the end of the 1960s and the beginning of the 1970s. Initially, Los Chiripitifláuticos was part of the children's show Antena Infantil, but was spun off into its own show because of its popularity. Among its characters were Locomotoro, Captain Tan, Valentina, Uncle Achilles, and the Malasombra Brothers. In 1970, when they had moved on to have their own program, the Locomotoro character was removed and the clown Poquito, Filetto, Capocomico and the boy Barullo added.

It was a popular series in Spain until the arrival of Los Payasos de la Tele in the early 1970s.

== Characters ==
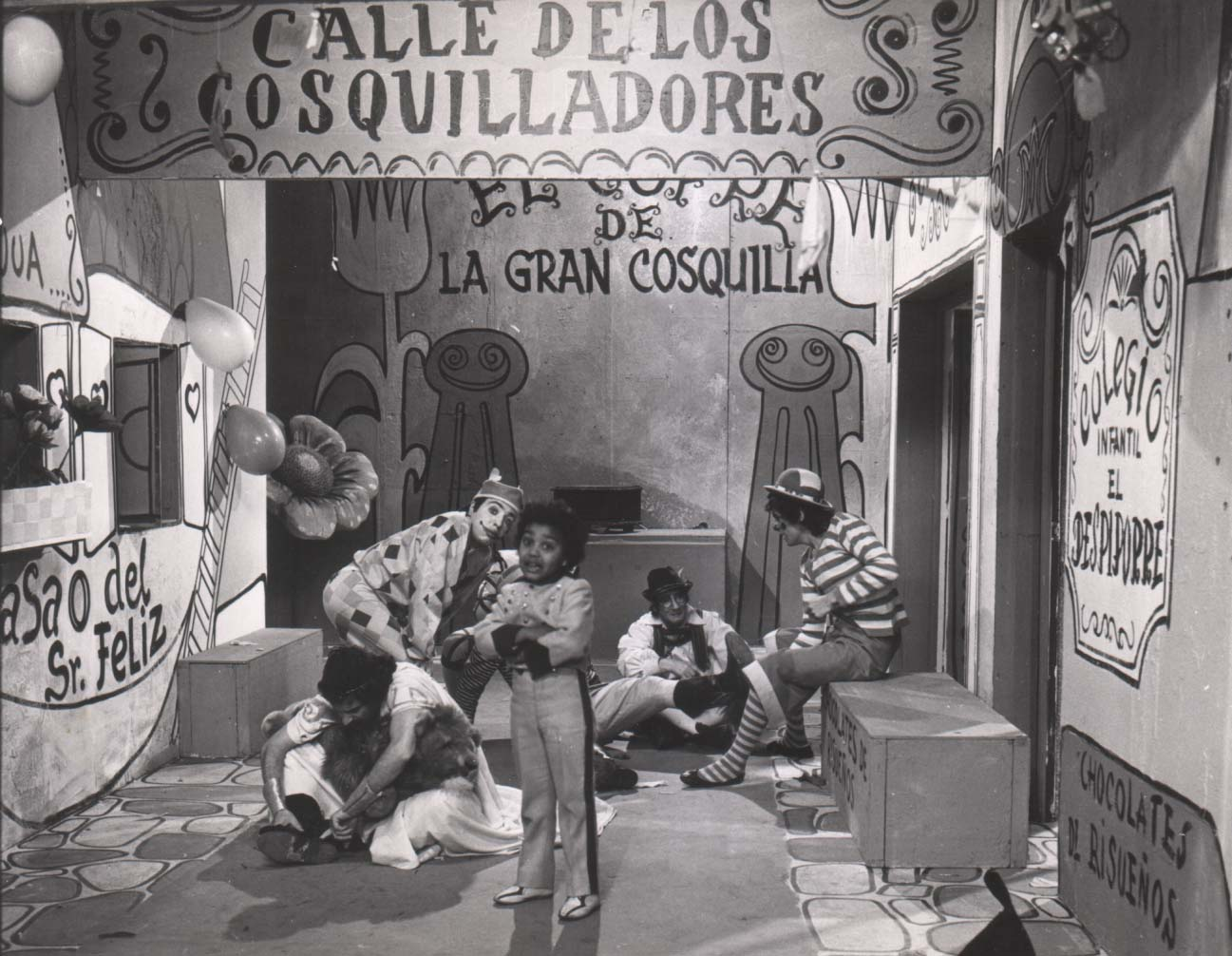
Barullo with the Chiripitiflauticos.

- Locomotive: Driver of everything, a "paletillo" with a beret, played by Paquino Cano, leaned his body forward with his feet flat on the ground. His sayings were "that makes me move my cheeks" (when he felt content) or "scratch that" (when he realised he was wrong), "hello buddies" (greeting), "all for one" (for himself), "one for all" (handing out candy), "one for you, one for me; one for you, two for me; one for you, three for me" (handing out other things). Greeting: "Good late afternoon!"
- Valentina: thin, wore big glasses, played by María del Carmen Goñi, was intelligent, sensible and audacious of the group. Greeting: "Hello, gentlemen guys."
- Captain Tan as a captain with his explorer pith helmet and striped shirt, was played by Felix Casas. At every opportunity, including during the characters' trips, he used the phrase: "In my travels across the length and breadth of this world..."
- Uncle Achilles, with thousands of nephews, an old man dressed in Tyrolean clothes, was played by Miguel Armario Bosch, represented prudence and was responsible for curbing the antics of other characters.
- Barullo: played by José Santiago Martinez, was the smallest, played by a black boy.
- Poquito: a clown played by Nicholas Romero.
- The Malasombra brothers, played by Luis González Páramo and Carlos Meneguini were two gunmen who were dressed in black, but when they became the brothers Buenasombra their costumes were white.
- Filetto Capocomico: Roberto Mosca played a character dressed in a Roman tunic, a laurel wreath and lyre, an opera lover. He was accompanied by a stuffed lion named Leocadius Augustus Tremebundus.
- Don Mandolio: a man dressed in black, owner of the Circus del Don Mandolio, who wanted to tame Leocadius and treated the clown Poquito badly.
- Secondary Characters: Osobusco, Aunt Rita

== Songs ==
The Chiripitifláuticos popularized a number of songs, which were successful among Spanish children of the 60s and 70s: "El barquito chiquitito" (The Little Boat), "Los hermanos Malasombra" (The Malasombra brothers), "La Vaca de Aravaca" (The Aravaca Cow), "Si quieres ser Capitan" (If you want to be Captain), and "El Reino del Revés" (The Backward Kingdom), sung respectively by all Chiripitifláuticos, the Malasombra Brothers, Locomotive, Captain Tan and Valentina.
