= Estudio 1 =

- Genre: Drama Anthology; Classic adaptations
- Country of origin: Spain
- Original language: Spanish

Production
- Production company: Televisión Española

Original release
- Network: TVE1
- Release: 6 October 1965 – 7 September 1984

Estudio 1 was a long-running Spanish television anthology series by Televisión Española presenting many classic plays for the home audience since 1965. It was equivalent to Au théâtre ce soir (1966–1985) on TF1 and Play of the Month (1965–1983) on the BBC. The series was noted for its productions of the great Spanish Golden Age playwrights as well as Shakespeare and Schiller.

It took its name from the studio it was filmed, Studio 1 at Prado del Rey. In its best times, one or two performances were broadcast daily (in the mid-afternoon and at evening), most of them live.
