= Manifesto Against the Death of the Spirit and the Earth =

The Manifesto Against the Death of the Spirit and the Earth (Spanish: Manifiesto contra la Muerte del Espíritu y de la Tierra) was a text published in the Spanish magazine El Cultural on 19 June 2002. (Note: The signataries were: Álvaro Mutis, Abel Posse, Adolfo Prego de Oliver y Tolivar, Alain de Benoist, Albert Boadella, Alberto Buela, Aquilino Duque, Beatriz de Moura, Carmen Posadas, Dante Bertini, Eduardo García Aguilar, Elena Santiago, Esperanza López Parada, Eugenio Montejo, Eugenio Trías, Felipe Juaristi Galdós, Félix Rosado, Fernando Sánchez Dragó, Hugo Celso Felipe Mansilla, Ilya Galán, Iñaki Ezquerra, Javier Nart, Javier Ruiz Portella, Joan Margarit, Jon Juaristi, José Javier Esparza, José Ramón Ripoll, Jorge Ruiz Dueñas, José Corredor Matheos, José Luis Giménez-Frontín, José Luis Molinuevo; Josep Maria Subirachs, Joumana Haddad, Juan Antonio Rodríguez Tous, Juan Pablo Fusi, Juan Pedro Quiñonero, Julio Martínez Mesanza, Latifo Kassidi, Laura Freixas, Lola Beccaria, Lourdes Cirlot, Luis Alberto de Cuenca, Luis Antonio de Villena, Luis Racionero, Manuel de Lope, Miguel Rodríguez-Acosta, Mihály Dés, Muhsin Al-Ramli, Néstor Montezanti, Oriol Bohigas, Pere Gimferrer, Pilar Gómez-Bedate, Pío Moa, Ramón Irigoyen, Raimon Ribera, Salvador Pániker, Tuga Tarle, William L. Siemens and Zoé Valdés.) Coauthored by Álvaro Mutis and Javier Ruiz Portella and described as an initiative to promote the ideas of the Nouvelle Droite, the text decried the "disenchantment of the world" and the "annihilation of the spirit's life", with the authors worried about "the disappearance of that breath by which men affirm themselves as men and not only as organic entities".

The endorsements overcame a mere new-rightist profile, being actually ideologically transversal, with supporting intellectuals coming from both the left and right. The endorsers linked to the New Right, most often partakers of initiatives such as the Proyecto Cultural Aurora or Hespérides and Nihil Obstat; namely Abel Posse, Aquilino Duque, Fernando Sánchez Dragó, Isidro Juan Palacios and José Javier Esparza became the coalescing nucleus around which the Grupo Manifiesto was formed.

Originally in Spanish, from 2002 to 2004 the manifesto was translated to Arabic, Catalan, English, Italian and French.
