= Isidro Juan Palacios =

Spanish author

Isidro Juan Palacios Tapias (born 1950) is a Spanish editor, author, philologist and teacher of oratory. Linked to the Nouvelle Droite (ND), he was a member of the now disbanded neo-Nazi CEDADE.

== Biography ==
He was born in 1950. In his youth he served as chief of the Madrilenian delegation of the Barcelona-based neo-Nazi organisation CEDADE, established on 30 March 1973; he shared membership with his brother Jesús, responsible for the Foreign Relations department of the organisation. He was editor along his brother of the national-socialist magazines Ruta Solar and Cuadernos de Cultura Vertical. He worked as secretary of Jorge Verstrynge during the latter's spell in People's Alliance. He has studied in deep the work of Japanese author Yukio Mishima.

He was a founder and chief editor of the esoteric magazine Punto y Coma (1983–1989), as well as other publications such as Graal (1975–1977), Veintiuno (1989–2003) and Proximo Milenio (1994–1996). In Punto y Coma, Palacios does not fully assume the ideas of the French Nouvelle Droite vis-à-vis its neopagan matrix, to the extent the latter considers Christianism an usurper, as Palacios rather espoused a balance between paganism and christianism. Between 1989 and 2003 he gave summer courses in Sciences of Communication at the Complutense University of Madrid. A member of the new-rightist Grupo Aurora and Hespérides, he was editor of the esoteric Próximo Milenio until 1996 (he remained as standout collaborator then). He was also editor of the Más Allá magazine in the 1990s.

He endorsed the 2002 "Manifesto Against the Death of the Spirit and the Earth" manifesto (although he is not featured as signatory).

Palacios formed along Abel Posse, Aquilino Duque, Fernando Sánchez Dragó and José Javier Esparza the core of the "Grupo Manifiesto", while also collaborating for the El Manifiesto magazine.

Palacio has been a fellow participant in Radio Nacional de España programmes and has collaborated in TV shows presented by Sánchez Dragó. Teacher of oratory, he has instructed affiliates of the People's Party in Castellón de la Plana, recommended by the national direction of Madrid. He has also collaborated for the FAES think-tank.
