= 1989 in Spanish television =

This is a list of Spanish television related events in 1989.

== Events ==
- 13 January: Luis Solana is appointed Director General of RTVE.
- 28 February: Canal Sur, Andalucia’s Regional Television channel is launched..
- 2 May: Telemadrid, Community of Madrid’s Regional Television channel is launched.
- 25 August: The Council of Ministers issues broadcasting licence to the TV Channels Antena 3, Telecinco and Canal +. Doing so, private commercial channels establish in Spain for the first time.
- 9 October: Canal 9, Valencian Community’s Regional Television channel is launched.
- 1 December: TVE Internacional the international broadcasting of the state-owned TV channel is launched.

== Debuts ==
Title	Channel	Debut	Performers/Host	Genre
Alquibla	TVE-1	1989-02-03		Documentary
A mi manera	TVE-1	1989-09-11	Jesús Hermida	Variety show
A Thousand and One... Americas	TVE-1	1989-10-30		Cartoon
Arte y artistas flamencos	La 2	1989-11-05		Music
Aventura 92	TVE-1	1989-08-03	Miguel de la Quadra-Salcedo	Youth
Brigada Central	TVE-1	1989-11-02	Imanol Arias	Drama series
La casa por la ventana	La 2	1989-10-31	Alfonso Arús	Quiz show
Un cesto lleno de libros	TVE-1	1989-05-10	Enrique Simón	Cultural/Science
Con tu cuerpo	TVE-1	1989-03-26	Laly Ruiz	Sport
De toros	La 2	1989-01-21	Manuel Molés	Bullfighting
Delirios de amor	TVE-1	1989-07-06	Eusebio Poncela	Drama series
El día por delante	TVE-1	1989-10-02	Pepe Navarro	Variety show
Las doce en punta	La 2	1989-10-30	Joaquín Arozamena	Variety show
Domingueros	TVE-1	1989-01-13	Joaquín Arozamena	Variety show
Juncal	TVE-1	1989-02-18	Francisco Rabal	Drama series
Langostino	TVE-1	1989-01-05	Rodolfo Pastor	Children
La Luna	TVE-1	1989-05-02	Julia Otero	Talk show
Miguel Servet, la sangre y la ceniza	TVE-1	1989-03-01	Juanjo Puigcorbé	Drama series
El mundo de Juan Lobón	TVE-1	1989-02-14	Luis Fernando Alvés	Drama series
Ni a tontas, ni a locas	La 2	1989-01-02	Las Virtudes	Variety show
La noche	TVE-1	1989-01-03	Fernando Sánchez Dragó	Talk show
Nuestra Europa	La 2	1989-03-01	Secundino González	News
El nuevo espectador	La 2	1989-01-31	Eduardo Sotillos	Cultural/Science
El olivar de Atocha	TVE-1	1989-04-19	Enriqueta Carballeira	Drama series
Pedro I, el Cruel	TVE-1	1989-01-09	Juan Luis Galiardo	Drama series
Pero ¿esto qué es?	TVE-1	1989-07-07	Luis Merlo	Variety Show
Plàstic	La 2	1989-04-25	Tinet Rubira	Music
Primera función	La 2	1989-01-12		Theatre
El Primijuego	TVE-1	1989-10-19	Nuria Guitart	Quiz show
Rockambole	TVE-1	1989-07-08	El Gran Wyoming	Music
Sábado revista	TVE-1	1989-05-20	Manuel Almendros	Variety show
El salero	TVE-1	1989-10-22	José Manuel Parada	Talent show
El séptimo cielo	TVE-1	1989-10-16	Mónica Randall	Sitcom
Sopa de gansos	TVE-1	1989-02-23	Rosa León	Children
El tiempo que vivimos	TVE-1	1989-03-07	Inma de Santis	Variety show
Todo motor	La 2	1989-01-11	Jesús Álvarez	Sport
Tribunal popular	TVE-1	1989-08-06	Javier Nart	Court show
La corona mágica	TVE-1	1989-10-21		Cartoon
Los Trotamúsicos	TVE-1	1989-10-01		Cartoon
Waku waku	TVE-1	1989-07-02	Consuelo Berlanga	Quiz show
Ya semos europeos	La 2	1989-11-04	Els Joglars	Comedy

== Television shows ==
=== La 1 ===
- Telediario (1957- )
- Estudio estadio (1972-2005)
- Informe Semanal (1973- )
- Parlamento (1978-2014)
- De película (1982-1991)
- Con las manos en la masa (1984-1991)
- Los Marginados (1984-1991)
- Punto y aparte (1985-1991)
- Buenos días (1986-1990)
- Hablando claro (1987-1992)
- 3x4 (1988-1990)
- A través del espejo (1988-1990)
- Entre líneas (1988-1990)
- Cajón desastre (1988-1991)
- Juego de niños (1988-1991)
- Juegos sin fronteras (1988-1992)
- Rockopop (1988-1992)
- El Precio justo (1988-2001)

=== La 2 ===
- Al filo de lo imposble (1982- )
- Pueblo de Dios (1982- )
- Últimas preguntas (1983- )
- En portada (1984- )
- Jazz entre amigos (1984-1991)
- Estadio 2 (1984-2007)
- Metrópolis (1985- )
- Documentos TV (1986- )
- Tendido cero (1986- )
- El Tiempo es oro (1987-1992)
- Cerca de las estrellas (1988-1990)

== Ending this year ==
=== La 1 ===
- La Tarde (1983-1989)
- Entre amigos (1985-1989)
- 48 horas (1987-1989)
- A media voz (1987-1989)
- Los Mundos de Yupi (1987-1989) I
- Por la mañana (1987-1989)
- Sábado noche (1987-1989)
- Circo pop (1988-1989)
- Diccionario de la salud (1988-1989)
- La Hora del TPT (1988-1989)
- Más estrellas que en el cielo (1988-1989)
- Tal cual (1988-1989)
- Tariro, Tariro (1988-1989)

=== La 2 ===
- Agenda informativa (1986-1989)
- FM 2 (1988-1989)

== Foreign series debuts in Spain ==
English title	Spanish title	Original title	Channel	Country	Performers
A Little Princess	La princesita		TVE	UK	Maureen Lipman
After Henry	Después de Henry		TVE	UK	Prunella Scales, Joan Sanderson
Agatha Christie's Poirot	Hércules Poirot		TVE	UK	David Suchet
All at No 20	Todos en el número 20		TVE	UK	Maureen Lipman
Beauty and the Beast	La bella y la bestia		FORTA	USA	Linda Hamilton, Ron Perlman
Berrenger's	Grandes almacenes		TVE	USA	Sam Wanamaker
Bless Me, Father	Bendígame padre		FORTA	UK	Arthur Lowe
Bravestarr	Brave star, el sherif		FORTA	USA	
---	Caballo viejo	Caballo viejo	TVE	COL	Carlos Muñoz
Cheers	Cheers		TVE	USA	Ted Danson
Chelmsford 123	Chelmsford 123		FORTA	UK	Jimmy Mulville
Crazy Like a Fox	Loco de remate		TVE	USA	Jack Warden, John Rubinstein
Drummonds	Drummonds		TVE	UK	Richard Pasco
Four on the Floor	Cuatro por los suelos		FORTA	CAN	Paul Chato
Frank's Place	El local de Frank		TVE	USA	Tim Reid
Fresh Fields	Como en los viejos tiempos		TVE	UK	Julia McKenzie, Anton Rodgers
Full House	Casa repleta		TVE	UK	Christopher Strauli
Hannay	Hannay		TVE	UK	Robert Powell
Jake and the Fatman	Jake y el gordo		TVE	USA	William Conrad
Knots Landing	California		FORTA	USA	Jim Houghton, Kim Lankford
---	La Piovra	La piovra	TVE	ITA	Michele Placido
Lovejoy	Lovejoy		TVE	UK	Ian McShane
Moravàgine	Moravagine	Moravàgine	FORTA	FRA	Roland Blanche
My Little Pony	Mi Pequeño Pony		TVE	USA	
Napoleon and Josephine: A Love Story	Napoleón y Josefina		TVE	USA	Armand Assante, Jacqueline Bisset
Neighbours	Vecinos		FORTA	AUS	Kylie Minogue, Jason Donovan
Newhart	Newhart		FORTA	USA	Bob Newhart
Outlaws	Más allá de la ley		TVE	USA	Rod Taylor
Professor Poopsnagle's Steam Zeppelin	El Profesor Poopsnagle		TVE	AUS	José María Caffarel
Red Dwarf	Enano rojo		FORTA	UK	Chris Barrie
Singles	Solteros		TVE	UK	Susie Blake
Sons and Lovers	Hijos y amantes		FORTA	UK	Eileen Atkins
The All New Popeye Hour	Las nuevas aventuras de Popeye		FORTA	USA	
The Fight Against Slavery	La lucha contra la esclavitud		FORTA	UK	David Collings
The Singing Detective	El detective cantante		FORTA	UK	Michael Gambon
The Storyteller	Cuentos europeos		FORTA	UK	John Hurt
Thirtysomething	Treintaytantos		TVE	USA	Ken Olin
You Can't Take It with You	Vive como quieras		TVE	USA	Harry Morgan

== Births ==
- 29 May - Aura Garrido, actress.
- 11 August - Úrsula Corberó, actress.
- 25 August - Carlos Serrano, actor.
- 5 November - Daniel Retuerta, actor.
- 26 December - Víctor Palmero, actor.

== Deaths ==
- 26 July - José Vivó, actor, 73.
- 8 August - Antonio Garisa, actor, 73.
- 21 December - Inma de Santis, actress & hostess, 30.

== See also ==
- 1989 in Spain
- List of Spanish films of 1989
