= Julia Otero =

Spanish journalist (born 1959)

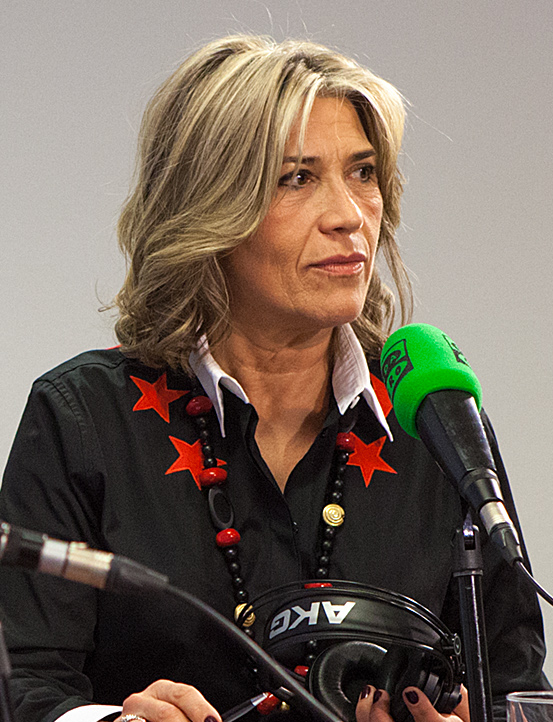
- On the program Julia en la onda in 2015
- Born: Julia María Otero Pérez; 6 May 1959 (age 67); Monforte de Lemos (Lugo), Spain
- Occupation: Journalist
- Employer: Onda Cero
- Spouse: Ramón Pellicer Colillas (1987–1993)
- Children: Candela Otero Martínez
- Website: www.juliaotero.net

Julia María Otero Pérez (born 6 May 1959) is a Spanish journalist.

== Biography ==
The only daughter of a trumpeter and a housewife, Julia Otero has lived in Barcelona since she was three years old. Her childhood was spent in the neighborhood of El Poble-sec. She obtained her licentiate in Spanish philology at the University of Barcelona. At age 17 she was casually introduced to the communications field through the program Protagonista, el cine on station Radio Sabadell, thanks to a friend. In a short time she became presenter and director of this program. Between the ages of 19 and 24, Julia was treated for an abdominal tumor which sent her to the operating room six times, but she never left her job on the radio.

In 1980, she signed on at Radio Juventud in Barcelona, and a year later she joined Radio Miramar in Barcelona, initially to work in information services. Later she presented several programs at the station, such as Radio a la vista (together with Carlos Herrera and José Manuel Parada), the comedy Bruja más que bruja, the musical Con faldas y a lo loco, the interview show Café del domingo, and the magazine Sábado noche. In 1985 she went on to direct and present the morning show Crónica del alba, which, thanks to the agreement between Radio Miramar and COPE, was broadcast from Barcelona to the whole of Spain through the network of stations of the episcopal chain. In September 1987, after the break between COPE and Radio Miramar, Otero was tasked with replacing Luis del Olmo on the Barcelona station's morning show Y nosotras, ¿qué?, which was defined as "an informative show made for and by women."

At this time Otero began her television career, in conjunction with the radio for a while. Her first entry into the medium was the debate program Una historia particular on La 2 of Televisión Española (TVE). The same year, she married journalist Ramón Pellicer (a marriage which would last six years). A year later in 1988, she began presenting the program 3×4, achieving great popularity. In the following years, Otero presented the TVE programs La Lluna (TVE Catalunya), La luna (1989), Telepasión Española (1990), and La Ronda (1991).

Beginning in 1991 Otero returned to the radio with the program La Radio de Julia on Onda Cero, which moved from its nighttime slot to late afternoon after becoming a success. She presented and directed the show until 1999. During this period she made incursions into television. In 1992 she presented Jocs de Nit on TV3; in 1993 she directed the contest Los cinco sentidos on Antena 3; Un paseo por el tiempo (1995) again on TVE; and on Telecinco, La semana que viene (1998), a program that was broadcast on Sunday nights. During 1997 she was a columnist for the newspaper La Vanguardia.

In 1999, ONCE sold the Onda Cero broadcasters to the Telefónica group. The new owners decided to cancel Julia Otero's program, despite it being an audience favorite, replacing her with journalist Marta Robles. This decision was marked by controversy, with accusations of political motivations. The management of the network said that the program was too "elitist" and "intellectually lofty". La radio de Julia had among its contributors names such as Almudena Grandes, Joaquín Leguina, Juan Adriansens, Jorge Verstrynge, Isabel de Medina Sidonia, Luis Racionero, Fernando Sánchez Dragó, Juan Jesús Armas Marcelo, Óscar Nebreda, Pablo Motos, Juanjo de la Iglesia, Académica Palanca, Jordi Estadella, Curri Valenzuela, Carlos Boyero, Lucía Etxebarria, Josep Borrell, Anna Balletbó i Puig, Xosé Manuel Beiras, and Ana Palacio (months later appointed Minister of Foreign Affairs).

A year later, she returned to TV3 to present the news magazine La columna, which lasted four seasons and also became an audience favorite. Between 2004 and 2005 she presented the program Las cerezas on TVE's La 1.

From 9 January 2006 to July 2007, she directed and presented the last installment of the long-running series Protagonistas, directed by Luis del Olmo for Punto Radio, and at the same time presented No em ratllis! on TV3.

On 1 June 1007 Punto Radio issued a statement announcing the termination of contractual relations with Otero, "by common accord".

In September 2007, Julia Otero returned to Onda Cero, where she presented Julia en la onda, replacing Gomaespuma. She returned to the house where La Radio de Julia was born and from which she was fired in 1999. Her good personal relationship with José Manuel Lara Bosch, president of Planeta Group and majority shareholder of Onda Cero, allowed her to return to the network. María Teresa Campos replaced her for the second part of Protagonistas on Punto Radio.

In December 2009, at the proposal of the Galician Civic Forum of Barcelona, she was named hija predilecta de Monforte (Monforte's favorite daughter), the first woman to receive such a distinction.

In May 2012 she returned to television to present Entrevista a la carta on TVE.

In August 2013 she was signed by Antena 3 to present Ciudadanos – two specials, the first dedicated to unemployment and the second to education.

== Awards ==
- Premios Ondas:
  - 1989: National Television Award (Televisión Española)
  - 1994: National Radio Award (La radio de Julia, Onda Cero)
  - 2003: National Television Award for Best Entertainment Program (La columna, TV3)
  - 2013: National Radio Award for Most Outstanding Career
- Micrófono de Oro in Category Television (2003)
- Micrófono de Oro in Category Radio (2012)
- Antena de Oro (1989) for La luna
- Nominated for the Academy of TV (ATV) Award for Best Entertainment Program Communicator in 2002, 2003, 2004, and 2005 for La Columna and Las cerezas
- TP de Oro for Best Presenter in 1988 for 3×4, and for Most Popular Personage in 1989 for La luna
- Ciutat de Badalona de Comunicació Award (2001)
- Associació de Dones Empresàries i Emprenedores de Tarragona (ADEE) Award (2004)
