= Aldealices =

- Municipality
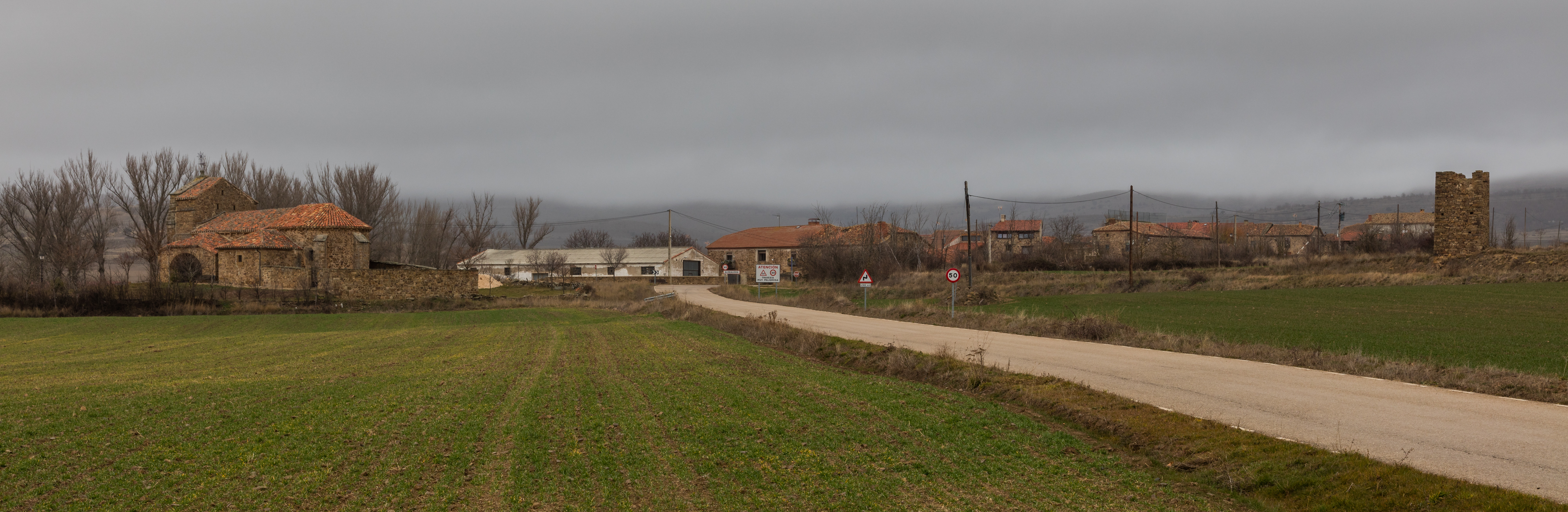

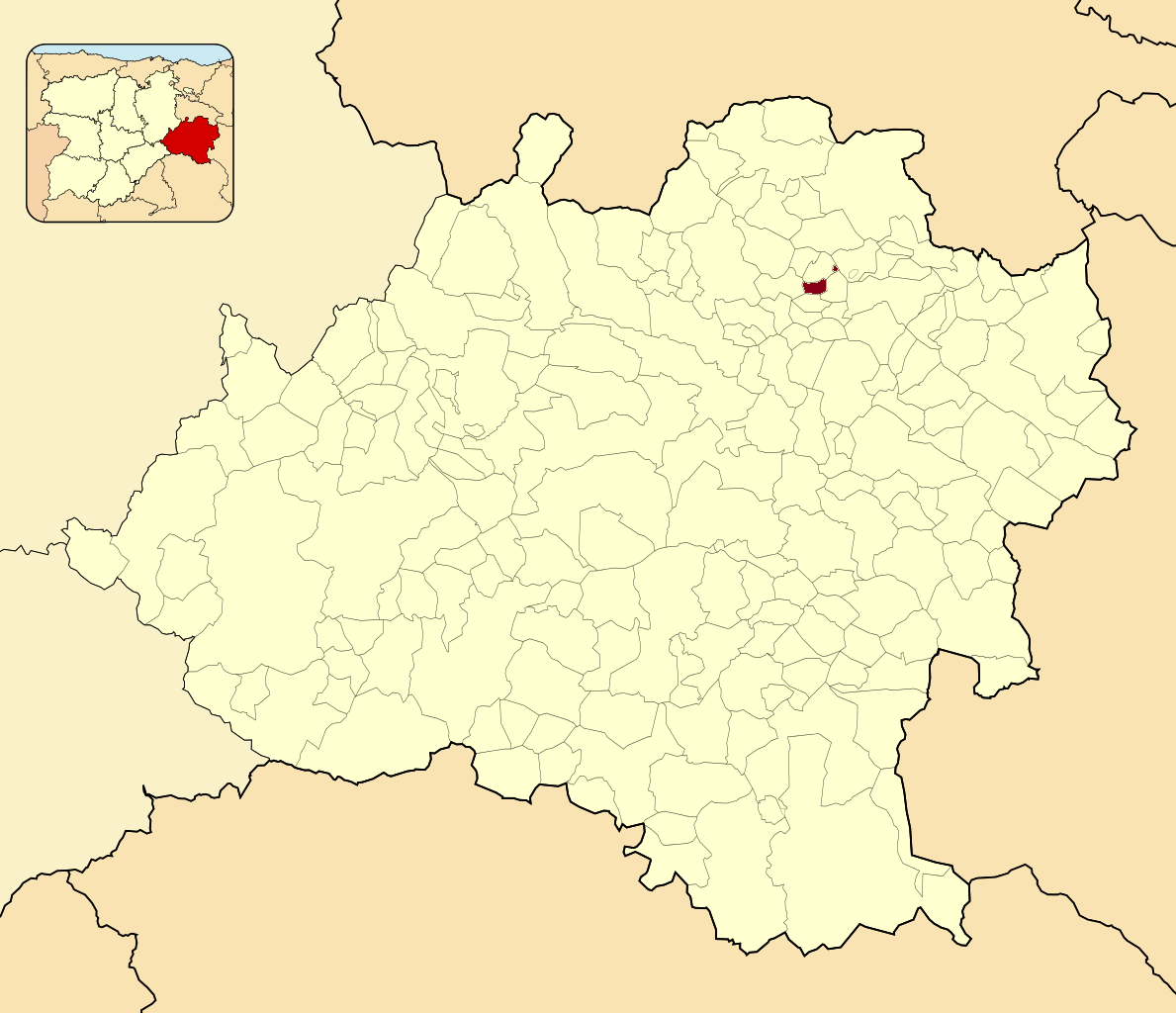
- Municipal location in the Province of Soria.

- Location in Spain Aldealices (Spain)
- Coordinates: 41°54′07″N 2°18′34″W
- Country: Spain
- Autonomous community: Castilla y León
- Province: Soria
- Comarca: Tierras Altas

Government
  - Alcalde: Atanasio Castillo Fernández (2015-) (PP)

Area
  - Total: 6.33 km^{2} (2.44 sq mi)
- Elevation: 1,133 m (3,717 ft)

Population (2025-01-01)
  - Total: 22
  - Density: 4.74/km^{2} (12.3/sq mi)
- Time zone: UTC+1 (CET)
  - Summer (DST): UTC+2 (CEST)
- Postal code: 42171
- Website: aldealices.es

Aldealices is a municipality located in the province of Soria, Castile and León, Spain. As of 2018 it had a population of 34 people. Aldealices lies on the SO-P-1206 provincial road which connects it to Castilfrío de la Sierra in the north and Aldealseñor in the south. It contains the Gothic Parroquia de Santa Maria Magdalena church.

== History ==
In the 1528 Census of Pecheros, in which there were no ecclesiastics, hidalgos and nobles, 19 pecheros (family units that paid taxes) were recorded. Previously spelled "Aldeahelizes", it formed part of the sexmo of San Juan.

== Geography ==
This small municipality in the Comarca de Tierras Altas is located in the north of the province. The Merdancho River, a tributary of the Duero River, flows through the area, to the south of the Sierra del Rodadero. Aldealices lies on the SO-P-1206 provincial road which connects it to Castilfrío de la Sierra in the north and Aldealseñor in the south.

== Landmarks ==
The village contains the Parroquia de Santa Maria Magdalena church. The church is built in the Gothic style and features a Romanesque baptismal font inside. About one kilometre southeast of Aldealices are the remains of an old Celtiberian castle, Los Castellares.

== Culture ==
The principal festivals held in the municipality are Assumption of Mary (August 14th) and San Roque (August 15th), and a festival in honour of the local patron saint, Santa María Magdalena (September 23rd).
