= Verstrynge =

Verstrynge is a surname. Notable people with the surname include:

- Emiel Verstrynge (born 2002), Belgian cyclist
- Jorge Verstrynge (born 1948), Spanish politician
