= José Javier Esparza Torres =

Spanish journalist, essayist, and cultural critic (b. 1963)

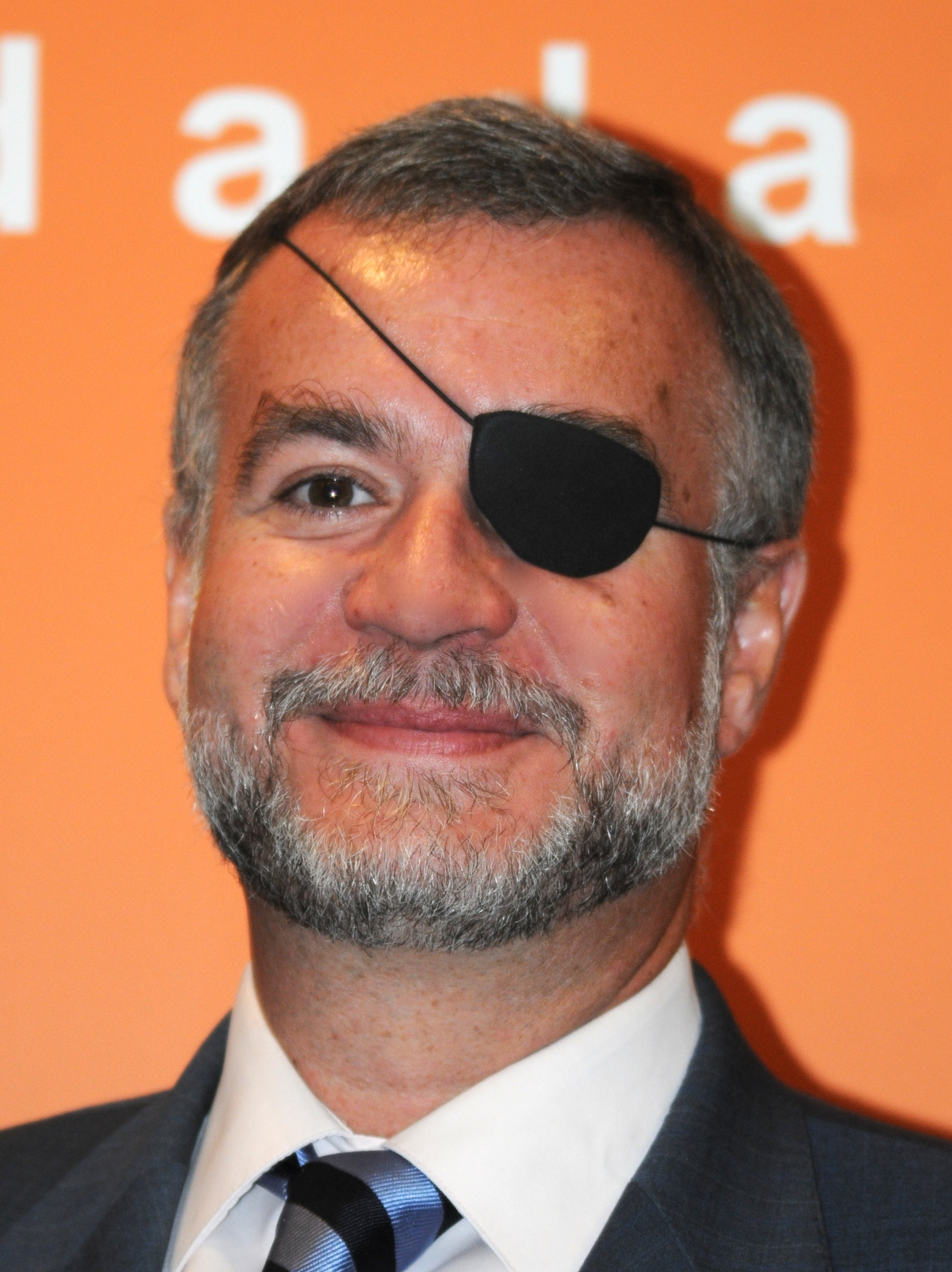
Esparza in 2009

José Javier Esparza Torres (born 1963) is a Spanish journalist, essayist and cultural critic.

He was born in 1963 in Valencia. He collaborated in Punto y Coma, a journal promoted by Jorge Verstrynge dedicated to the dissemination of Nouvelle Droite ideas in Spain along with other authors such as Fernando Sánchez Dragó and Javier Sadaba. Likewise, he also was a promoter of Hespérides, another journal linked to the Nouvelle Droite and Alain de Benoist (although Esparza avoided the pagan or antichristian facet of the movement), and the so-called metapolitical Proyecto Cultural Aurora. He also participated in La Razón Española, a francoist journal.

At the onset of the 21st century, Esparza, coming from the political right, devoted himself from his radio platform in the Cadena COPE to the laudation of "spanish feats" a long history in a chronology already starting in Roman Hispania. He has also written several essays of historical disclosure. His production relative to the Second Republic and the Civil War has been described as "junk" by Ricardo Robledo.

He has worked for ABC, Ya and the Correo Group, joining Intereconomía in 2010.
