= Jesús Palacios Tapias =

Spanish writer

Jesús Palacios Tapias (born 1952) is a Spanish essayist who has authored several books about contemporary history of Spain. He was a member of the neo-Nazi CEDADE, now disbanded.

== Biography ==
Born in San Lorenzo de El Escorial in 1952, Palacios participated in the 1972 World Anti-Communist League (WACL) congress in Mexico, where, dressed in a brown shirt and a black tie, he declared before the audience that Marxism was a tool to "install the tyranny of the Jews". During his youth, Palacios also served as delegate of Foreign Relations of the neo-Nazi CEDADE, while his brother Isidro Juan held the role of chief of the Madrilenian delegation of the Barcelona-based organization, established on 30 March 1973, during an event in which Palacios participated as speaker next to president Jorge Mota. Palacios also took part in a meeting of the so-called "Black International" of neo-fascist groups in Bavaria. He edited along with his brother the National Socialist journals Ruta Solar and Cuadernos de Cultura Vertical.

As the owner of the limited company Sarmata S.L., he was the producer of a documentary for Telemadrid, made in 2006 (Las claves del 23-F). In 2010 he gave a course in criminology at the Complutense University of Madrid, in which Juan Antonio Aguilar, former member of Bases Autónomas, was a speaker.

He is the author of several books dealing with the contemporary history of Spain, including two books authored ex-aequo with right-leaning historian Stanley G. Payne, one of them a biography of the dictator Francisco Franco described as distilling a "hagiographic tone".

== Works ==
- Las cartas de Franco (La Esfera de los Libros, 2005)
- Franco y Juan Carlos. Del franquismo a la Monarquía (Flor del Viento, 2005)
- Franco, mi padre: testimonio de Carmen Franco, la hija del Caudillo (La Esfera de los Libros, 2008), co-author along Stanley G. Payne.
- 23 F, el Rey y su secreto (Libros Libres 2011)
- Franco, una biografía personal y política (Espasa-Calpe, 2014), co-author along Stanley Payne. (Note: Also published in English under the title Franco: A Personal and Political Biography (University of Wisconsin Press, 2014).)
