= Lilith Verstrynge =

Spanish former politician

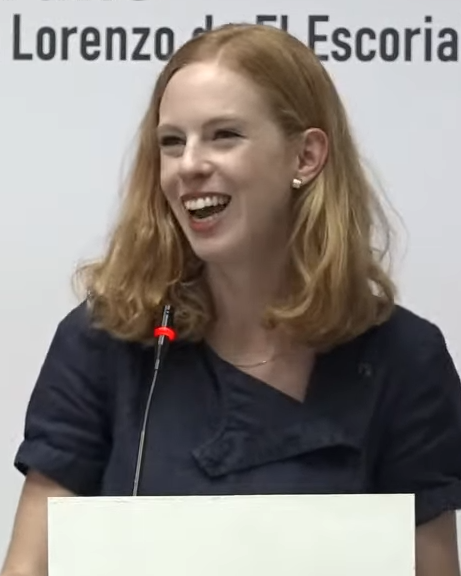

Lilith Verstrynge Revuelta (born 7 July 1992) is a Spanish former politician. The daughter of Jorge Verstrynge, with whom she shared membership of Podemos, she served in the Congress of Deputies for six months up to January 2024, and was Secretary of State for the 2030 Agenda from July 2022 to November 2023.

== Family and education ==
Verstrynge is the daughter of fellow politician Jorge Verstrynge, who was born in 1948 in the Tangier International Zone. Jorge Verstrynge was secretary general of the People's Alliance, the precursor to the People's Party, from 1979 to 1986. After a dispute with his predecessor Manuel Fraga, he quit the party in 1986 and moved to the left, joining the Spanish Socialist Workers' Party (PSOE) in 1993 and Podemos in 2013. Jorge Verstrynge's biological father was Willy Verstrynge, a supporter of Belgian Nazi collaborator Léon Degrelle, while his stepfather was René Mazel, a French communist expelled from colonial Algeria for his beliefs.

Verstrynge was raised in the Fuente del Berro neighbourhood of the Salamanca district of Madrid. She was educated at the Lycée Français de Madrid and then studied history at the Paris Diderot University and European studies and international relations at the Sorbonne University in Paris, followed by a master's degree in political sciences from LMU Munich. According to a 2023 article in El Nacional, she can speak Spanish, French, English, German, Portuguese and Arabic.

== Political career ==
Verstrynge began working for Podemos in 2016 as a consultant in the European Parliament in Brussels, then in the Assembly of Madrid. In June 2021, secretary general Ione Belarra named her the secretary of organisation for Podemos. Thirteen months later, she was named Secretary of State for the 2030 Agenda, replacing Enrique Santiago. When Belarra was removed from her ministry by prime minister of Spain Pedro Sánchez, Verstrynge was also removed from her role.

In the 2023 Spanish general election, Sumar ran on a joint list with En Comú Podem in the Barcelona constituency, with Verstrynge fourth on the list. The Sumar-ECP list had five members elected to the Congress of Deputies.

On 26 January 2024, Verstrynge resigned her seat in Congress and left Podemos, citing health reasons. Her seat was filled by a Sumar deputy, meaning that Podemos went down to four members of Congress and Sumar up to 27. In 2025 Verstrynge herself reflected in a Guardian article on her experiences in Podemos and the reasons for her resignation.
