= Aquilino Duque =

Spanish poet and writer (1931–2021)

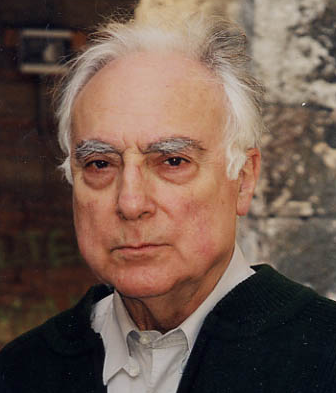
Aquilino Duque.png

Aquilino Duque Gimeno (January 6, 1931 – September 18, 2021) was a Spanish poet and writer. He received the National Literature Prize for Narrative in 1974.
