= Javier Nart =

Spanish journalist and politician

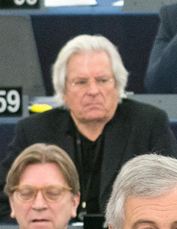
- Born: 19 August 1947; Laredo
- Alma mater: University of Barcelona
- Occupation: Politician, writer, lawyer, war correspondent (1977–1984)
- Political party: Citizens
- Position held: Member of the European Parliament (2014–2019), Member of the European Parliament (2019–)

Javier Nart Peñalver (Spanish pronunciation: [xaˈβjeɾ ˈnaɾt]; born 19 August 1947) is a Spanish journalist and politician who has been a member of the European Parliament since 2014, currently taking part in the Renew Europe group. From 2012 until 2019, he was a member of Citizens (Cs).

== Early life and education ==
Nart was born on 19 August 1947 in Laredo, in the autonomous community of Cantabria. His father was the First Notary of Bilbao.

Nart attended an Opus Dei school and was being prepared to join the Society of Jesus, something that did not suit him because he is nonreligious. Despite his unbelief, he says that he has "tremendous respect" for the Jesuits, particularly the ones he would later meet in his travels in Nicaragua. Nart studied law at the University of Barcelona, but also took up journalism because he wanted to make his way to Barcelona without his father. He jokes that he was a "picapleito" (bad lawyer) during the week, but citizen activist on the weekend.

== Writing career ==
In his early career Nart worked as a war correspondent in many countries, including Lebanon, Chad, Myanmar and Yemen. Nart interviewed and got to know individuals who participated in most of the important world conflicts between 1977 and 1992. He also covered the Nicaraguan Revolution that led to the 1979 ouster of dictator Anastasio Somoza by the Sandinista National Liberation Front. As he explains, he went from war to war and took photographs that aided international understandings of these conflicts. He developed a particularly strong relationship with the Palestinians and the Fatah resistance forces. According to Nart, they deserve a better life than what they currently have under Israeli occupation, though he is not shy about criticizing some of the Fatah leadership.

As a photographer, some of Nart's photographs appeared in major newspapers like Newsweek. One photograph he took, as he explains in an interview with Pablo Iglesias, was of a dead boy with his mother holding 10 dollars to purchase some supplies. He regrets publishing this photograph. He speaks of the barbarity of war, that when images are shown to the public, it can cause them to lose support for a war they had previously liked, like the Vietnam War. He is very concerned with remote-controlled drones making serious casualties seem like a video game. It dehumanizes the very real sufferings of war.

Nart's first book, Viaje al otro Brasil: del Mato Grosso a la Amazonia y al nordeste Atlántico was published in 2002. Unlike most of his work, it does not have war as its subject matter, and instead is a tour guide to see parts of Brazil many tourists who stick to hotspots like São Paulo or Rio de Janeiro do not visit. ¡Sálvese quien pueda! Mis historias e historias de guerra (Every man for himself: My stories and the stories of war) came out in 2003. It was written so that his children would know about his war experiences. The wars he reported from showed how barbaric humans can be, but also the converse, how heroic they can be as well. The scenes he witnessed were so horrific that Nart could not talk to his family for days after his return to Spain.

Nart published three books in 2007. Guerrilleros. El pueblo español en armas contra Napoleón, 1808–1814 (Warriors: The Spanish people in arms against Napoleon) is a history of the resistance to Napoleon and his brother Joseph installed as king of Spain. He also put out two more Viajes, Viaje al Mekong. Cabalgando el dragón por Tailandia, Laos, Camboya y Vietnam (Trip to the Mekong: Riding the dragon through Thailand, Laos, Cambodia and Vietnam) and Viaje al desierto: de Kano a El Cairo (Trip in the Desert: from Kano to Cairo).

Nart published his most recent book, Nunca la nada fue tanto (Never was nothing so much) in the summer of 2016, that seeks to explain why he participated in so many conflicts. Nart's reply was "that it is a material duty, not only moral, to subtract a part of injustice, of pain, of misery. That life without freedom and without justice, or without striving for them, becomes useless movement." It is his commitment to justice that is one of the defining facts of his life. In this book he frequently criticized the guerrillas he lived amongst, who were often neutral to his presence. Nonetheless, Nart did recognize the necessity of armed struggle against the Somoza oligarchy in Nicaragua.

== Political career ==
=== Early beginnings ===
In 2002 Nart was one of the adherents to the Manifiesto contra la Muerte del Espíritu y de la Tierra ("Manifesto against the Death of the Spirit and the Earth"), one of the attempts to thrust the ideas of the so-called Spanish Nouvelle Droite.

=== Member of the European Parliament, 2014–present ===
On 22 February 2014 Nart was elected in primaries to head the candidacy of Citizens for the European elections of that year. He was subsequently elected to the European Parliament. In the Parliament, he served as vice chair of the Alliance of Liberals and Democrats for Europe group. He has also been serving on the Committee on Foreign Affairs and its Subcommittee on Security and Defence. In addition to his committee assignments, he has been part of the Parliament's delegations to the ACP-EU Joint Parliamentary Assembly (2014–2019) and the Euro-Latin American Parliamentary Assembly (since 2019).

Nart renovated his seat the European Parliament at the 2019 European election, running 5th in the Cs list. On 24 June 2019, Nart renounced to his role as member of the Cs' national committee, after a voting in which the later re-affirmed in its veto to negotiate with the PSOE.

Months later, in September 2019, Nart communicated the party the cancellation of his membership, although he would remain as MEP, defending the platform the party ran vis-à-vis the 2019 election. He explained he left the party because of the "absolute disagreement with establishing a single subjective alliance (with the PP) and objective one (with Vox)".

Nart led the European Union's monitoring mission during the 2020 Ghanaian general election.

== Positions ==
Nart is very supportive of a united Europe and considers the European Union a necessity. Like other Ciudadanos parliamentarians, he likes the idea of moving towards a United States of Europe. European integration also involves foreign and defense policy that is aligned with NATO. Nart believes that a European project that guarantees the member states peace, democracy, and social welfare is too important to allow Euroskeptics to have their way.

In a joint letter with 15 other MEPs from various political groups, Nart urged the High Representative of the Union for Foreign Affairs and Security Policy Josep Borrell in early 2021 to replace the European Union’s ambassador to Cuba for allegedly siding with the country’s Communist leadership.
