= Manuel de Lope =

Spanish novelist

- Born: Jesús Manuel de Lope Rebollo; 8 January 1949 (age 77); Burgos (Castile), Spain
- Occupation: Novelist
- Writing career
- Language: Spanish
- Genre: Novel
- Notable work: The wrong blood

Jesús Manuel de Lope Rebollo (born 8 January 1949 in Burgos, Spain) is a Spanish novelist. He lives and works in Madrid.

== Works ==
- Albertina en el país de los garamantes (1978)
- El otoño del siglo (1981)
- Shakespeare al anochecer (1992)
- Octubre en el menú (1992)
- Jardines de África (1992)
- Bella en las tinieblas (1997)
- El libro de piel de tiburón (1997)
- Madrid Continental (1998)
- Las perlas peregrinas (1998)
- Música para tigres (1999)
- La sangre ajena (2000), translated into English by John Cullen as The Wrong Blood (Other Press, 2010)
- Iberia. La puerta iluminada (2004)
- Iberia. La imagen múltiple (2005)
- Otras islas (2009)
- Azul sobre azul (2011)
