= Aldealseñor =

- Municipality
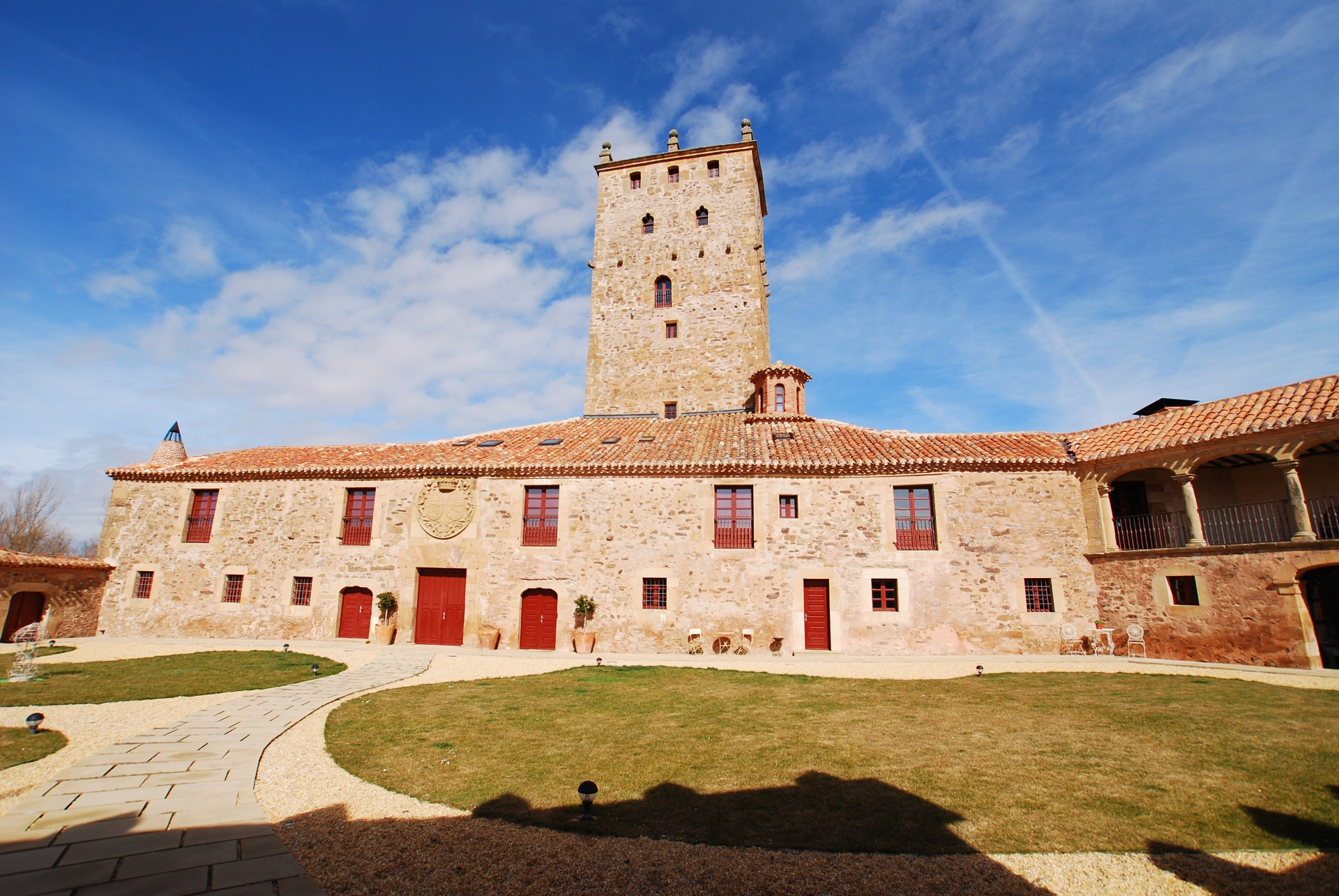
- Palacio de Aldealseñor

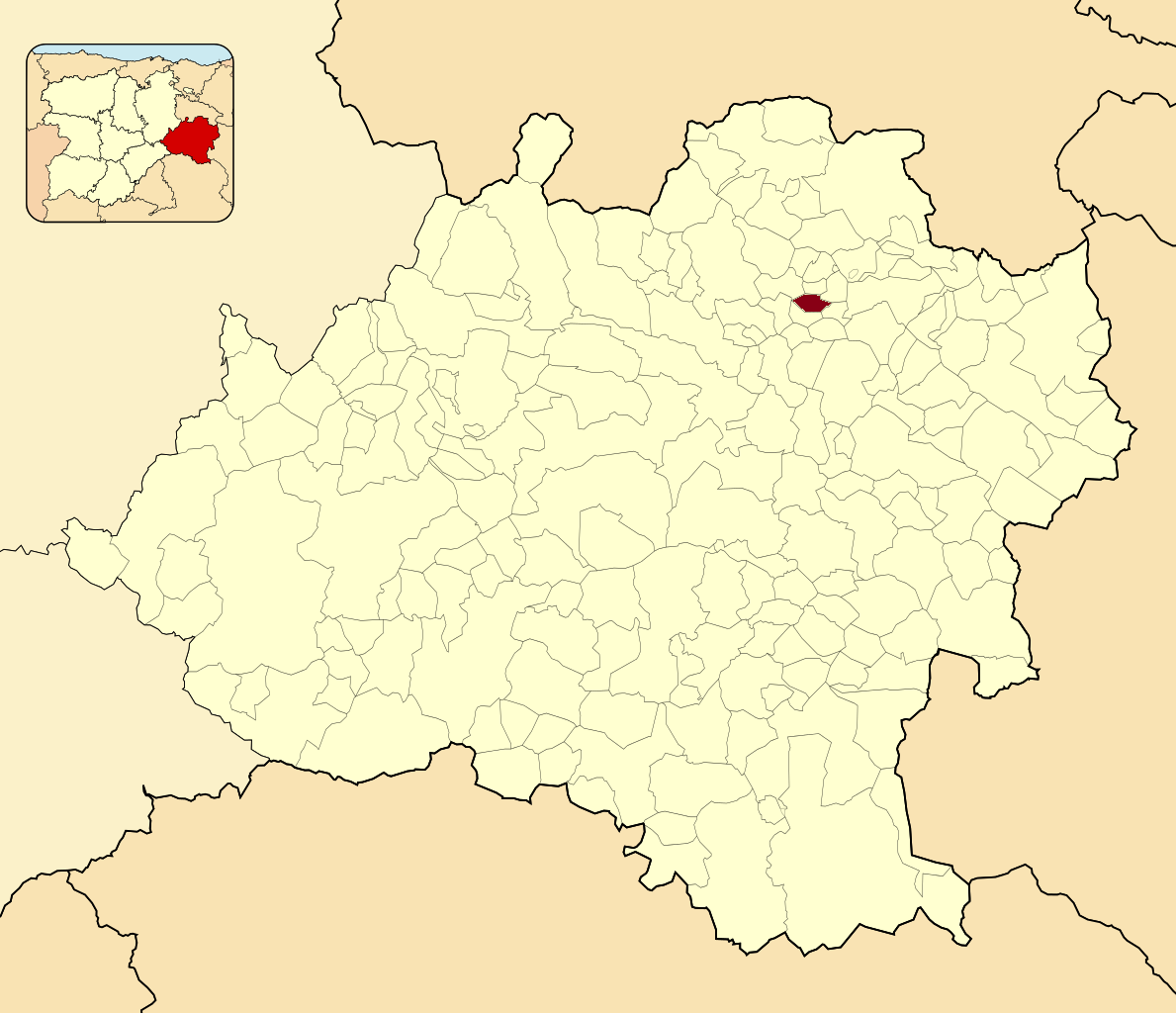
- Municipal location in the Province of Soria.

- Location in Spain Aldealseñor (Spain)
- Coordinates: 41°52′44″N 2°18′56″W
- Country: Spain
- Autonomous community: Castilla y León
- Province: Soria
- Comarca: Campo de Gómara

Government
  - Alcalde: Silvano García Mingo (2015-) (Agrupación de Vecinos de Aldealseñor (AVA))

Area
  - Total: 9.29 km^{2} (3.59 sq mi)
- Elevation: 1,088 m (3,570 ft)

Population (2025-01-01)
  - Total: 29
  - Density: 3.34/km^{2} (8.7/sq mi)
- Time zone: UTC+1 (CET)
  - Summer (DST): UTC+2 (CEST)
- Postal code: 42180
- Website: aldealsenor.es

Aldealseñor is a municipality located in the province of Soria, Castile and León, Spain. As of 2018 it had a population of 30 people.
