= Castilfrío de la Sierra =

- Municipality
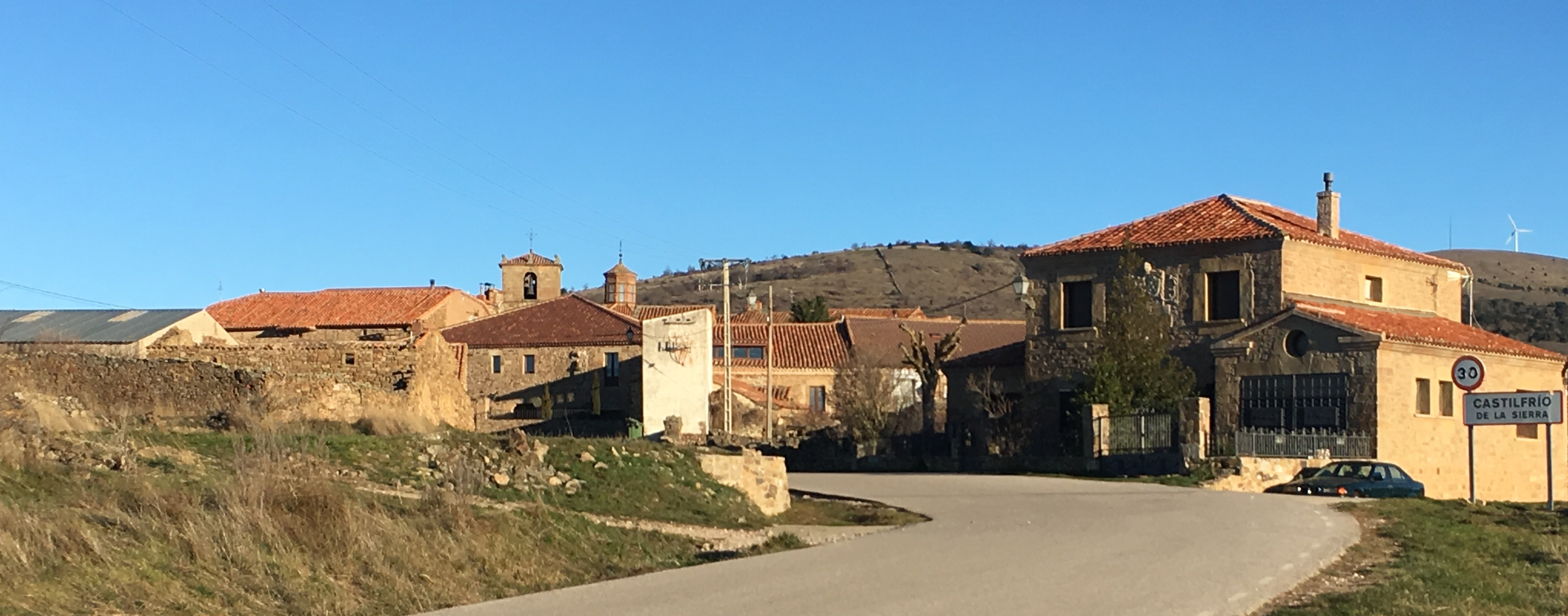
- Street of Castilfrío de la Sierra, Soria, Spain

- Location in Spain. Castilfrío de la Sierra (Spain)
- Country: Spain
- Autonomous community: Castile and León
- Province: Soria
- Municipality: Castilfrío de la Sierra

Area
  - Total: 12 km^{2} (4.6 sq mi)

Population (2025-01-01)
  - Total: 35
  - Density: 2.9/km^{2} (7.6/sq mi)
- Time zone: UTC+1 (CET)
  - Summer (DST): UTC+2 (CEST)
- Website: Official website

Castilfrío de la Sierra is a municipality located in the province of Soria, Castile and León, Spain. According to the 2004 census (INE), the municipality has a population of 27 inhabitants.

== History ==
During the Middle Ages, the locality belonged to the Community of Villa y Tierra de Soria as part of the Sexmo de Tera.

The 1528 Census of Pecheros (taxpaying households), which excluded clergy, nobility, and hidalgos, documented 26 pecheros—families subject to taxation. In the original document, the village is listed as Castelfrío de San Juan.

Following the collapse of the Old Regime, the locality became a constitutional municipality, then known as Castil Frío, in the region of Old Castile, Partido de Soria. By the 1842 census, it had 85 households and 348 residents. By the mid-19th century, the village comprised approximately 100 houses. The settlement is described in the sixth volume of Pascual Madoz’s Diccionario geográfico-estadístico-histórico de España y sus posesiones de Ultramar as follows:

CASTILFRIO DE LA SIERRA: A municipality in the province and judicial district of Soria (4 leagues away), under the territorial court and captaincy general of Burgos (25 leagues), and diocese of Osma (14 leagues). Location: On the southern slope of the Sierra de Oncala, exposed to north and west winds. Climate: Cold, with pneumonia as the most common ailment. The village has 100 houses, including the town hall, a jail, and a primary school attended by 26 pupils under a teacher paid 400 reales. It features a hermitage (El Humilladero) and a parish church (La Asunción de Ntra. Sra.) served by a second-tier priest. Two nearby springs provide good water for drinking and domestic use. Borders: North—Oncala; East—Valtagero (1 league); South—Aldealices (½ league); West—La Estepa de San Juan (1 league). Within these bounds lie the Hermitage of Ntra. Sra. del Carrascal and the abandoned settlements of San Bartolomé and Sotillo. Terrain: Rocky, with a forest of holm oaks and other trees. Roads: Connects to neighboring villages, in moderate condition. Mail: Delivered and dispatched via courier from Soria’s post office, arriving on Tuesdays and Saturdays and departing on Mondays and Fridays. Produce: Common wheat, barley, oats; livestock includes merino sheep (transhumant and stationary) and cattle. Game: Partridges, hares, and formerly quail. Industry: Agriculture and livestock. Population: 85 households, 348 residents. Tax revenue: 63,764 reales and 14 maravedís. Municipal budget: Ranges from 4,000 to 6,000 reales, funded by municipal properties and household contributions.

— (Madoz 1847, p. 171)

== Sources ==
- Madoz, Pascual, ed. (1847). Diccionario geográfico-estadístico-histórico de España y sus posesiones de ultramar. Vol. 6. Madrid: Est. Literario-Tipográfico de P. Madoz y L. Sagasti.
