= Abel Posse =

Argentine writer and diplomat (1934–2023)

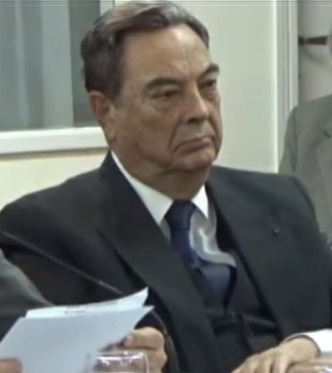
- Born: 7 January 1934
- Died: 14 April 2023 (aged 89); Buenos Aires
- Occupation: Diplomat, writer, essayist, university teacher, jurist
- Awards: Grand Cross of the Order of Civil Merit (2004)
- Website: www.abelposse.com

Abel Parentini Posse (7 January 1934 – 14 April 2023) was an Argentine novelist, essayist, poet, career diplomat, and politician. Posse was a diplomat for the Argentinian Foreign Service from 1966 to 2004.

He is the author of fourteen novels, seven collections of essays, an extensive journalistic work that included 400-odd articles, together with a series of short stories and poems. Posse was a regular contributor to the liberal-conservative daily La Nación in Buenos Aires, as well as other Argentine dailies (such as Perfil and La Gaceta de Tucumán) and Spanish papers (ABC, El Mundo and El País). He was also editor in-chief of the Revista Argentina de Estudios Estratégicos (Argentine Journal of Strategic Studies).

For his narrative fiction, Posse received several distinguished awards. In November 2012, he became a numbered member of the Argentine Academy of Letters.

== Early life and education ==
Abel Parentini Posse was born on 7 January 1934 in the city of Córdoba, Argentina. When he was two, the family moved to Buenos Aires for his father's work.

Posse's father, Ernesto Parentini was one of the founders of Artistas Argentinos Asociados and the producer of the feature film La Guerra Gaucha (1942). Posse's mother, Elba Alicia Posse, belonged to a Creole-landed oligarchy of Galician descent that held vast sugar mill estates in the North West province of Tucuman. One of Posse's aunts was Esmeralda Leiva de Heredia, better known as “La Jardín”, an actress and friend of Eva Perón. One of Posse's maternal great-grandfathers was a patron of the arts, while Julio Argentino Roca, twice president of Argentina, was a relative.

Posse grew up near Buenos Aires's Rivadavia Street. Through his father's profession, Posse was exposed to the city's artistic and cultural life, which he would later evoke in his literature. Posse mingled with Argentine show business stars, such as like Chas de Cruz, Pierina Dealessi, Ulises Petit de Murat, and Muñoz Azpiri, as well as the tango composers, Aníbal Troilo and Homero Manzi, which gave him an encyclopaedic knowledge of the tango repertoire and culture.

Posse went to primary school at the Colegio La Salle. When he was 8, he wrote and illustrated little books that he would sell to his grandmother, who lived in the same apartment complex. In 1943, at the age of 13, Posse launched himself into his first literary project, an unfinished novel set in Imperial Rome. Posse went to secondary school, from 1946 to 1952, at the prestigious Colegio Nacional de Buenos Aires. There, he became friends with other artists and writers, such as the translator, Rogelio Bazán. Amongst his teachers, was the orientalist philosopher Vicente Fatone who stirred an interest in philosophy evident in several of his novels.

== University education ==
Posse studied at the Law Faculty in Buenos Aires until 1958. During the day, he endured lectures "by fascist-Peronist professors” while enjoying Buenos Aires at night.

According to Posse, his nighttime meetings and conversations in Buenos Aires cafés allowed him to deepen his knowledge of Russian and French literature, German philosophy, and Oriental spiritualism. He met Jorge Luis Borges, Eduardo Mallea, Ezequiel Martínez Estrada, Ricardo Molinari, Manuel Mujica Lainez, Ramón Gomez de la Serna and Rafael Alberti. He also became close friends with the poets Conrado Nalé Roxlo and Carlos Mastronardi, as well as Borges, who opened the doors of the Sociedad Argentina de Escritores (SADE) for him and who would later help him to publish his first short stories and poems in the daily, El Mundo.

It was at this time that Posse became attracted to Peronist ideas despite having been born into an anti-Peronist family. A public demonstration on 17 October 1945 also left an impression on him, together with the public grieving aroused by Eva Perón's funeral in 1952. These years of Posse's life are depicted in certain passages of La reina del Plata (1988) and La pasión segun Eva (1994), a fictional biography of Eva Perón's final days.

After military service in 1955, Posse completed his university studies in 1958. The same year, he wrote a screenplay, “La cumparsa” (The Troupe), which was given an award by the National Institute of Cinematography.

After graduating, Posse travelled to Europe. With a university scholarship, Posse undertook doctoral studies in political sciences at the Sorbonne in Paris. Just before his travels, he published his first poem, “Invocación al fantasma de mi infancia muerta”, in the literary supplement of El Mundo.

While in Europe, he deepened his knowledge of the poetry of Hölderlin, Rilke and Trakl, studied Sartre, and met Pablo Neruda. In Paris, he also met the German student, Wiebke Sabine Langenheim, who would become his wife.

In 1961, Posse spent two semesters in Tübingen, Germany, the home of Hölderlin. That same year, his poem, “En la tumba de Georg Trakl”, the first ever text signed as Abel Posse, was awarded the Rene Bastianini prize of the SADE in Buenos Aires. During his stay in Tübingen, he began writing his first novel, Los bogavantes, which he would finish in 1967.

== Career ==
=== From Buenos Aires to the Foreign Service ===
Posse returned to Buenos Aires in 1962. After a competitive selection process, he taught as an assistant in constitutional law under professor Carlos Fayt at the University of Buenos Aires. With little enthusiasm, he also began to work as a lawyer. Sabine traveled to Argentina and a while later they were married. In 1965 he was admitted to the Argentine Foreign Service after a public selection process (20). Until 2004 he would live most of his life abroad, as such most of his works were written outside of Argentina, although he always defended his Argentine identity, his literary production was well served by Ricardo Güiraldes’ adage, “distance reveals” (21).

=== Moscow (1966–1969) ===
Abel Posse's only son, Ivan, was born in Moscow in January 1967. At this time in the Russian capital, he also finished writing his first novel, Los bogavantes, set in Paris and Seville, centered on a trio of characters, two of whom are students and one a Foreign Service employee, embodying the ideological tensions of the early 1960s. This neo-realist novel played an important part in his literary career. Under the pseudonym of Arnaut Daniel, Posse submitted it to the 1968 Planeta Prize. It featured among the four finalists, and although it had been virtually declared the winner by the judges José Manuel de Lara and Baltasar Porcel, under Francoist pressure the judges had to overturn their decision, due to some charged erotic scenes, above all because of its critical and ironical references to the regime's military. Once it had been published in 1970 by Editorial Brújula in Argentina, thanks to the support of Ernesto Sabato and Posse's father, and after it received the Sash of Honour of the SADE, Los bogavantes was later published in Barcelona in 1975 where it was the object of Francoist censorship. All 5000 copies were purged of two pages that ridiculed the masculinity of army officers. This singular publishing episode (22) brought him under the attention of those who were the leading literary publishers of the time, Carlos Barral and Carmen Balcells; the latter would become his literary agent.

=== Lima (1969–1971) ===
Abel Posse was posted to Peru in 1969 and appointed cultural secretary of the embassy in Lima. For him Peru represented the discovery of Inca culture, the “revelation of the Americas” (23) which compelled him to identify himself with his Creole roots of North-Western Argentina (24). A visit to Machu Picchu inspired a long poem of 240 verses, Celebración de Machu Picchu, which he wrote in Cuzco in 1970 and published much later in Venice in 1977. Also in 1970, he wrote his most ambitious poetical piece, Celebración del desamparo, which was amongst the finalists of the Maldoror Poetry Prize although Posse decided against publishing it. In those years he read José María Arguedas and the great Cuban stylists: Alejo Carpentier, Lezama Lima and Severo Sarduy. He also researched the life of Argentina's national independence hero, General José de San Martín, and in 1971 was admitted to the Instituto Sanmartiniano de Lima. In Peru he also wrote his second novel, La boca del tigre (1971), inspired by his personal experiences in the Soviet Union. This novel, clearly influenced by Ernesto Sabato's neo-realist style of fiction, helped the author to articulate his distrust of the overbearing ideologies of the time, in order to criticize the exercise of power in the contemporary world and to reflect on the place of the individual in that historical juncture. This thematic concern foreshadowed the ideas about history in his later novel Daimon. La boca del tigre, which received the third National Prize of Argentine Literature, hints at his initial musings on the notion of Americanness (americanidad). (25) The influence that the Argentine philosopher and anthropologist Rodolfo Günther Kusch would have on Posse's fiction and indeed his own worldview after his encounter with him and his readings of La seducción de la babarie (1953) and América profunda (1962). Consequently, Kusch's thought on the fundamental ontological and cultural antagonism between the West's homo faber with the Americano “man of being” and the symbiotic relationship of Amerindians with the Cosmos (“the Open”) was to become a leitmotif in Posse's work, and particularly in his “Trilogy of the Discovery of America”.

=== Venice (1973–1979) ===
Posse was named Consul General for Venice in 1973, where he lived for 6 years. It was here that he wrote Daimon (1978), between October 1973 and August 1977, the novel which began the “Trilogy of the Discovery of America”. This novel has as its protagonist a fictional avatar of the Spanish conquistador Lope de Aguirre (1510–1561). In this text, the conqueror, known for his cruelty which is depicted by chroniclers as the archetypal madman and traitor, raises from his ashes eleven years after his death together with the ghosts of his Marañones. Thus begins the “Jornada de América”, through four centuries of painful Latin American history, on which he casts a disillusioned gaze, by seeing it as an “Eternal-Return-of-the-Same”; that is the eternal annihilation of man's liberty against which Lope de Aguirre's rebelliousness is powerless to arrest. This fruitless trans-historical rebellion drives him to an ambiguous death in the mid-1970s in Latin America, a condition that bears a resemblance to the death of Ernesto Che Guevara's revolutionary venture in Bolivia. Several scenes of torture suffered by the protagonist clearly resemble the atrocities committed by the Argentine military during the country's last military dictatorship. (26) This novel constitutes a milestone in Posse's poetics, as it is enthused with Rabelaisian elements in a baroque style, by continually resorting to the use of humour and ambiguity, to parody, intertextuality, anachronism, the grotesque, and continuous paratextual dialogue with the reader, characteristics which would reach their highest intensity in the subsequent novel, The dogs of paradise (1983). Daimon was shortlisted for the prestigious Romulo Gallegos Prize in 1982.

The Venetian sojourn was where he received the recognition of his peers; he was visited by friends such as Ernesto Sabato, Carlos Barral, Manuel Scorza, Victor Massuh, Antonio Requeni, Manuel Mujica Lainez, Jorge Luis Borges, Antonio Di Benedetto and Juan Rulfo. (27) He also met in Venice, Alejo Carpentier, who was writing his Concierto barroco (1974), as well as Italo Calvino, Alberto Moravia and Giorgio Bassani. During his years in Venice, Posse reflected on the Heideggerian concept of “the Open” (Das Offene) and Kusch's ideas concerning ‘being’. (29) In 1973 he visited the German philosopher Martin Heidegger (30), and in 1979 together with his wife Sabine published a Spanish translation of Der feldweg. (31) After a brief trip to Buenos Aires in 1975, and on his return to Venice, he wrote between April and June of the same year a dark novel reflecting the murderous political violence being played out in Argentina at the time, titled Momento de morir, but which he did not publish until 1979. Its protagonist, Medardo Rabagliatti, a rather mediocre and irresolute suburban solicitor, is witness to the unfolding armed violence perpetrated by groups of youngsters depicted as fanatics and a sadistic military. Against all odds, the story's denouement sees the vacillating Medardo kill the murderous military leader responsible for the repression and later oversee the re-establishment of democratic political institutions in the country. The historical reading proposed by the author (various characters are clearly fictional avatars of Mario Firmenich and Hector J. Campora) condemns without a doubt the ERP (Ejercito Revolucionario del Pueblo), the Monotoneros and the military repression, thus underlining the “thesis of two evils”; a thesis the author holds in the prologue he added to the 1997 edition. (32)

=== Paris (1981–1985) ===
In 1981 Posse was appointed director of the Argentine Cultural Centre in Paris. It was there where he wrote The dogs of paradise (1983), second part of his “Trilogy”, with Christopher Columbus as its protagonist, and for which he was awarded the 1987 Rómulo Gallegos Prize. This novel, translated into many languages, confirmed Posse, according to many literary scholars, as one of the leading exponents of Latin America's “New Historical Novel”. As in Daimon, the novel questions the validity of the official historiography of the conquest of the Americas, undermines the laws governing space and time, and anachronism is systematic, as is intertextuality, the pastiche, parody, while the work harbours, like Daimon, a profound reflection on the Latin American condition and its identity. The dogs of paradise explores the motivations of the Catholic Monarchs and Columbus, as well as the aftermath of the clash of cultures triggers by the arrival of the Spaniards through the dialogical testimony of the defeated. Between 1982 and 1985 Posse edited a bilingual collection (Spanish and French) of 15 Argentine poets titled Nadir, which included: Leopoldo Lugones, Enrique Molina, Héctor Antonio Murena, Juan L. Ortiza, Ricardo Molinari, Conrado Nalé Roxlo, Baldomero Fernandez Moreno, Alejandra Pizarnik, Oliverio Girondo, Manuel J. Castilla, Alberto Girri, Raul G. Aguirre, Juan Rodolfo Wilcock, Ezequiel Martínez Estrada and Leopoldo Marechal. This project was carried out with the assistance of Argentine and French poets, academics and translators. The volumes were gifted and distributed to French libraries and universities, with the aim of increasing interest in these works internationally. The project was no doubt inspired by Roger Caillois who, with his collection La Croix du Sud, made a major contribution to the international recognition of Jorge Luis Borges’ work. (34) In January 1983 at age 15, Ivan, Posse's only son committed suicide at the family's apartment in Paris, a tragedy which the author would chronicle many years later in Cuando muere el hijo (2009), an autobiographical account presented as a “real chronicle”. When The dogs of paradise appeared in bookshops he announced the forthcoming publication of the third sequel of the “Trilogy”, titled Sobre las misiones jesuíticas, to be set in the Jesuit missions of Paraguay. (35) While its appearance was announced in 1986, with a different title, Los heraldos negros, it is as yet unpublished. (36) In November 1983, alongside the Paris Autumn Festival, Posse organised with Claudio Segovia a tango festival called Tango argentin, where Roberto Goyeneche participated and which was destined, as it were in his own words: “to bring to life the real tango, the primitive tango of the origins” as against the “tango for export” of Astor Piazzolla. (37)

=== Israel (1985–1988) ===
After the death of his son, Posse could no longer live in Paris and he was appointed Plenipotentiary Minister at the Argentine embassy in Tel-Aviv. He returned to writing there, and wrote three novels, quite different to his previous ones. He wrote two novels on Nazism, Los demonios ocultos (1987) and El viajero de Agartha (1989). Los demonios ocultos was a literary project Posse had begun much earlier in 1971, after having met several Nazis in Buenos Aires during his university days. The protagonist of the novels, cast in a neorealist style, is a young Argentine, Alberto Lorca, who goes in search of his father, Walther Werner, a German scientist who specialized in Oriental esoterism, who was sent by the Third Reich on a mission to Central Asia. The plot takes place in two temporal spaces, the Second World War and the Argentina of the last military dictatorship. El viajero de Agartha (1989, Premio Internacional Diana-Novedades, Mexico) is a true adventure espionage novel. Walter Werner as protagonist narrates the story in a diary recovered by his son, which recounts his mission in Tibet in his search for the mythical city of Agartha. The third novel, La reina del Plata (1988), as the title indicates is a homage to the Argentine capital and the period of splendor it once knew. The novel takes place in a futuristic Buenos Aires, whose society is polarized between “Insiders” and “Outsiders”, where the “Outsider” Guillermo Aguirre ruminates on his own identity. The plot is narrated in fragments comprising ninety short chapters, while the action takes place in the typically Buenos Aires atmosphere of cafes and streets inhabited by the tango, the deep musical expression of the port city, where its characters muse about the past and present of the country.

=== Prague (1990–1996) ===
In 1990 Posse was promoted to Ambassador by President Carlos S. Menem and was posted to Prague for six years. His stay in the Czech capital was quite productive. Here he composed his literary essay Biblioteca essential which he published in 1991, where he proposes the most important 101 works of universal literature and his own canon of the literature of the River Plate. Posse also wrote in the Czech capital El largo atardecer del caminante, the novel which closes the “Trilogy of the Discovery of America”, and which was crowned with the Premio Internacional Extremadura-America V Centenario 1992, where 180 novels had entered. In this work, the baroque style of Daimon and The dogs of paradise give way to a more somber and reflective style. The protagonist in this work is the conqueror Alvar Nuñez Cabeza de Vaca (1490–1558), who lives the last years of his life in a humble abode in Seville, where he reminisces about his ‘true’ American adventure through an autobiographical and sincere retelling of his exploits by filling in the blanks and the silences left by his chronicles titled Castaways and Commentaries. Posse's Cabeza de Vaca assumes his americanidad, his hybrid identity, by announcing his maxim, “only faith can cure, only kindness heals” as a way the conquest should have taken place. This introspective and autobiographical style is continued in his next work, La pasión según Eva (1994). This is a biographical novel (fictionalised biography) with a polyphonic text which sees an ailing Eva Perón living the last nine months of her life while casting a retrospective gaze over her life. At the same time, Posse collects and recovers the testimony of people who knew her, illustrating and readjusting Eva's own account. Although the text has a clear empathy with its subject, the novel's stated aim is to provide a deeper understanding of this powerful woman than given by previous biographies, taking her life out of the ideological straitjacket and transforming it into a destined life.

=== Lima (1998–2000) ===
During his posting as ambassador to Lima, Peru, Posse wrote another biographical novel, Los cuadernos de Praga (1998), which also has as its protagonist another memorable 20th-century Argentine, Ernesto ‘Che” Guevara Lynch. As with several of his earlier novels, the author was inspired by personal experience; Posse was informed during his stay in Prague that Che Guevara lived undercover in the city for almost a year after his defeat in the Congo. Like in La pasión según Eva, the motive of the personal diary is the trigger for the autobiographical account, an account that converses with the research the author has carried out. Similarly to the previous novel, the objective of the author is not to simply recount the life of the historical person, but based on “solid foundations”, rescue his destiny in order to give an account of his life beyond the ideological. (38) On his return to Latin America after his European postings Posse increased his journalistic opinion pieces in El Excelsior (Mexico), El Nacional (Caracas), ABC and El Mundo (Madrid), Linea and La Nación (Buenos Aires). Posse arrived in Peru when there was still a tense relationship with Ecuador over the war of El Condor, and in the aftermath of the kidnapping of hostages at the Japanese embassy by the MRTA (1997). Posse spoke highly of the Alberto Fujimori's war against the MRTA at the same time he expressed his opposition to the trials by Baltasar Garzón against Augusto Pinochet and the International Human Rights Court, measures which he attributed to meddling into the internal affairs of Latin American countries. His opinion pieces also underscored the role Argentina could play in the consolidation of MERCOSUR and highlighted the natural resources of the country for the benefit of the next millennium, by appealing to the patriotism of its citizens and calling on them to imitate the example of Julio Argentino Roca, Hipölito Yrigoyen and Juan Domingo Perón. Many of these articles were brought together in the first collection of political essays he published in Argentina, el gran viraje (2000). His return to Peru renewed his interest in the national hero, Jose de San Martin, which inspired the short story “Paz en guerra” (2000).

=== Copenhagen (2001–2002) ===
In 2001, during his posting as ambassador to Copenhagen, Denmark, Posse published El inquietante día de la vida, which received the Literary Prize of the Argentine Academy of Letters for the period 1998–2001. The protagonist is Felipe Segundo Posse, based on a real-life ancestor of his who was heir to a vast estate of sugar mills in Tucuman province in the late 19th century. The story begins when he is diagnosed with tuberculosis and decides to abandon his family by traveling to Buenos Aires and then on to Egypt in search of the poet Rimbaud. The novel also fictionalizes historical characters like Domingo F. Sarmiento, Julio A. Roca and Nicolás Avellaneda while celebrating Argentina's development at the end of the 19th and beginning of the 20th centuries.

=== Madrid (2002–2004) ===
After a brief posting at UNESCO in Paris, Posse was appointed by President Duhalde Argentine ambassador to Spain. This was a hugely important posting, particularly due to the aftermath of the 2001 Argentine financial collapse, as this country was the main destination of Argentine migrants of Spanish descent. At the time Posse witnessed the deadly terrorist attacks in the Spanish capital on 11 March 2004. Deeply concerned by the crisis facing Argentina, Posse increased his opinion pieces in La Nación, defending regional integration, national sovereignty, and appealing to national reconstruction by evoking the memory of national figures such as Sarmiento and Evita. In 2003 he published another collection of political articles, El eclipse argentino. De la enfermedad colectiva al renacimiento, a work which attempts to outlay a blueprint for a national project. Once Néstor Kirchner assumed power, several media outlets pronounced Posse as the preferred candidate as foreign affairs minister, given his diplomatic experience, his age and his key posting in Spain. The journalist and former Montonero militant Miguel Bonasso published an opinion piece and participated in a TV program where he appealed to the president to put aside Posse's candidature, whom he accused of having a benevolent attitude toward the previous military dictatorship for not having abandoned his diplomatic duties, and for his support of the Fujimori regime. (39) The president appointed Rafael Bielsa as foreign affairs minister, while Posse continued his appointment at the embassy in Madrid until his retirement in 2004 when he returned to Argentina.

== Later life ==
=== Buenos Aires (2004–2023) ===
After his retirement, Posse's commitment to the anti-Kirchner opposition increased. In very critical and controversial newspaper columns, he linked the president and his supporters to extreme left-wing militant movements of the 1970s, and he also opposed the restart of trials against the military, and the government's policy of collective memory which he labeled as incomplete.

He increased his spate of conferences on the state of the nation and he supported the presidential candidacy of Eduardo Duhalde in 2007.

In 2005, he published En letra grande, a collection of literary essays and reflections on intellectuals close to him and who he considered as influential. He also published in 2006 a series of political essays under the title La santa locura de los argentinos, which was a best-selle. In October 2009, he published Cuando muere el hijo.

Toward the end of 2009, Posse accepted the post of Minister of Education for the City of Buenos Aires offered by Mauricio Macri, which had been left vacant by Mariano Narodowski. Posse took office a day after having published a controversial article in the daily La Nación, titled “Criminality and cowardice”, where he declared that rock music dumbed down the young, and criticised law and order measures of the President. His appointment and this opinion piece triggered a wave of protests by unions and students, and criticism from sections of the media, who accused Posse of having had close ties with previous dictatorship. In fact, a notorious military henchmen, Benjamin Menendez, who was on trial at the time, paraphrased a few sentences from Posse's article, which tarnished Posse's image even further. Given such circumstances, Posse resigned 11 days into his new posting.

In 2011, Posse he published Noche de lobos, based on the written account of a Montonero female leader who had been held captive and tortured at the ESMA (Navy School of Mechanics) and who had fallen in love with her torturer. This work delves into the conflicts between the urban guerrillas and the military, and was semi-biographical as the protagonist had given her typed account to Posse in the early 1980s while he was at the Argentine embassy in Paris. (42)

After his resignation as Minister of Education of Buenos Aires, Abel Posse continued to live in this city, where he gave talked and where he published frequently in Perfil and La Nación. He remained critical of the Kirchner policies and concerned about the future of the country.

In November 2012, Abel Posse was an elected numbered member of the Argentine Academy of Letters, taking the place of the late Rafael Obligado. In May 2014, he became an elected numbered member of the National Academy of Education taking the numbered chair Bartolome Mitre.

== Death ==
Abel Posse died on 14 April 2023, at the age of 89.

== List of works ==
=== Novels ===
- Los bogavantes (1970)
- La boca del tigre (1971)
- Daimón (1978) (Translated from the Spanish by Sarah Arvio. Atheneum, Macmillan, New York, 1992)
- Momento de morir (1979)
- Los perros del paraíso (1983); The dogs of Paradise (Translated from the Spanish by Margaret Sayers Peden. Atheneum, Macmillan, New York, 1989)
- Los demonios ocultos (1987)
- La reina del Plata (1988)
- El viajero de Agartha (1989)
- El largo atardecer del caminante (1992)
- La pasión según Eva (1994)
- Los cuadernos de Praga (1998)
- El inquietante día de la vida (2001)
- Cuando muere el hijo (2009)
- Noche de lobos (2011)
- Vivir Venecia (2016, forthcoming)

=== Essays ===
- Biblioteca essential (1991)
- Argentina, el gran viraje (2000)
- El eclipse argentino. De la enfermedad colectiva al renacimiento (2003)
- En letra grande (2005)
- La santa locura de los argentinos (2006)
- Sobrevivir Argentina (2014)
- Réquiem para la política. ¿O renacimiento? (2015)

=== Poetry ===
- “Invocación al fantasma de mi infancia muerta”, El Mundo, Buenos Aires, 13/03/1959.
- “En la tumba de Georg Trakl”, Eco, Revista de la cultura de Occidente, Bogotá, n°25, 05/1962, p. 35-37.
- “Georg Trakl 1887-1914”, La Gaceta, San Miguel de Tucumán, 1/02/1987.
- Celebración del desamparo, 1970 (inédito).
- Celebración de Machu Pichu (1977)

=== Short stories ===
- “Cuando el águila desaparece”, La Nación, 17/08/1989.
- “Paz en guerra”, en Relatos por la paz, Amsterdam: Radio Nacional Holanda, 2000, p. 67-75

=== Translations ===
- Martín Heidegger, El sendero del campo, traducción de Sabine Langenheim y Abel Posse, Rosario: Editorial La Ventana, 1979, 58 p.

== Bibliography ==
- Página oficial de Abel Posse: http://www.abelposse.com
- Sáinz de Medrano, Luis (coord.), Abel Posse. Semana de author, AECI: Madrid, 1997.
- Abel Posse en la Audiovdeoteca de Buenos Aires: https://web.archive.org/web/20121015142732/http://www.audiovideotecaba.gov.ar/areas/com_social/audiovideoteca/literatura/posse_bio_es.php
- Aínsa, Fernando, La nueva novela histórica latinoamericana, México: Plural, 1996, p. 82-85.
- Aracil Varón, Beatriz, Abel Posse: de la crónica al mito de América, Cuadernos de América sin nombre n.º 9, Universidad de Alicante, 2004.
- Esposto, Roberto, Peregrinaje a los Orígenes. “Civilización y barbarie” en las novelas de Abel Posse, New México: Research University Press, 2005.
- Esposto, Roberto, Abel Posse. Senderos de un caminante solitario. Buenos Aires: Biblos, 2013.
- Filer, Malva, «La visión de América en la Obra de Abel Posse», en Spiller, Roland (Ed.), La novela Argentina de los años 80, Lateinamerika Studien, Erlangen, vol. 29, 1991, p. 99-117.
- Lojo, María Rosa, «Poéticas del viaje en la Argentina actual», en Kohut, Karl (Ed.), Literaturas del Río de la Plata hoy. De las utopías al desencanto, Madrid-Frankfurt, Iberoamericana-Vervuert, 1996, p. 135-143.
- Magras, Romain, «L’intellectuel face à la célébration du (bi)centenaire de la Nation argentine. Regards croisés sur les figures de Leopoldo Lugones et Abel Posse», en Regards sur deux siècles d’indépendance: significations du bicentenaire en Amérique Latine, Cahiers ALHIM, n.º 19, Université Paris 8, 2010, p. 205-220. http://alhim.revues.org/index3519.html
- Maturo, Graciela, «Interioridad e Historia en El largo atardecer del caminante de Abel Posse», en América: recomienzo de la Historia. La lectura auroral de la Historia en la novela hispanoamericana, Buenos Aires: Biblos, 2010, p. 87-100.
- Menton, Seymour, «La denuncia del poder. Los perros del paraíso», en La nueva novela histórica, México: FCE, 1993, p. 102-128.
- Pons, María Cristina, «El secreto de la historia y el regreso de la novela histórica», en Historia crítica de la literatura Argentina. La narración gana la partida, Buenos Aires, Emecé Editores, 2000, p. 97-116.
- Pulgarín Cuadrado, Amalia, «La reescritura de la historia: Los perros del paraíso de Abel Posse», en Metaficción historiográfica en la narrativa hispánica posmodernista, Madrid: Fundamentos, 1995, p. 57-106.
- Sáinz de Medrano, Luis, «Abel Posse, la búsqueda de lo absoluto», Anales de literatura hispanoamericana, n.º 21, Editorial Complutense, Madrid, 1992, p. 467-480.
- Sánchez Zamorano, J.A., Aguirre: la cólera de la historia. Aproximación a la «nueva novela latinoamericana» a través de la narrativa de Abel Posse, Universidad de Sevilla, 2002.
- Vega, Ana María, «Daimón, de Abel Posse. Un camino hacia la identidad latinoamericana», Los Andes, Mendoza, 9 de enero de 1990, p. 3-4.
- Waldegaray, Marta Inés, «La experiencia de la escritura en la novelística de Abel Posse», en Travaux et Documents, n.º 22, Université Paris 8, 2003, p. 117-132.
- Waldemer, Thomas, «Tyranny, writing and memory in Abel Posse’s Daimón», en Cincinnati Romance Review, Cincinnati, OH, 1997, n.º 16, p. 1-7.
