= Fernando Sánchez Dragó =

Spanish writer (1936–2023)

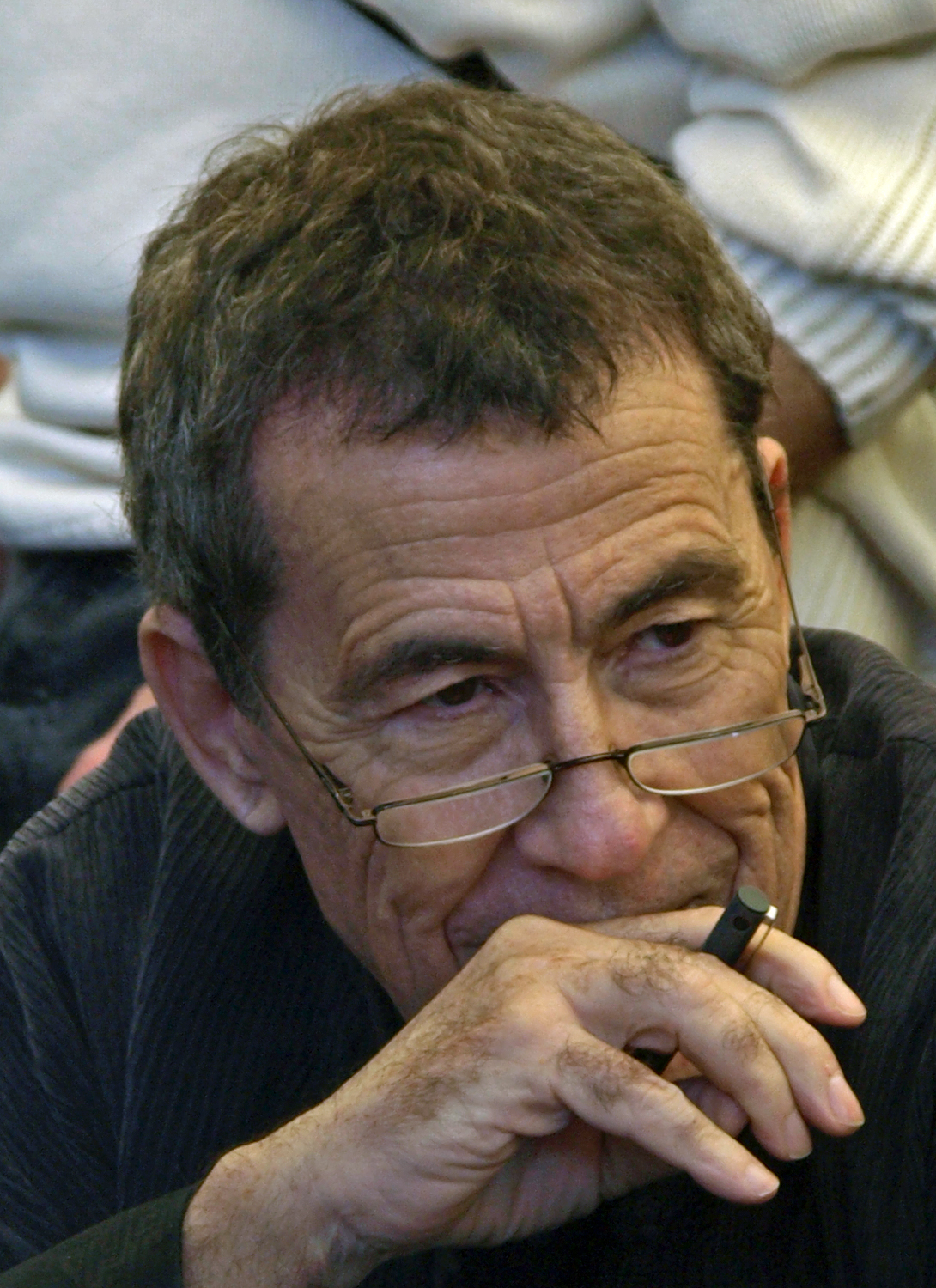
- Dragó in 2008
- Born: Fernando Sánchez Dragó; 2 October 1936; Madrid, Spain
- Died: 10 April 2023 (aged 86); Castilfrío de la Sierra, Spain
- Education: Colegio del Pilar; University of Madrid
- Occupation: Writer
- Writing career
- Period: 1950–2023 (writer); 1970s–2010s (television host)
- Genres: Novel, essay, autobiography, Travel book
- Subjects: Travel, literature, culture
- Notable awards: Premio Planeta de Novela; Premio Nacional de Ensayo (1979); Premio Planeta (1992); Premio Ondas
- Website: sanchezdrago.com

Fernando Sánchez Dragó (2 October 1936 – 10 April 2023) was a Spanish writer and television host.

== Biography ==
Fernando Sánchez Dragó was born in the Salamanca district of Madrid, the posthumous son of Fernando Sánchez Monreal, a journalist who was killed in the Spanish Civil War by the Francoist Nationalist faction. His father was director of the news agency Febus, as well as director of the agency Noti-Sport.

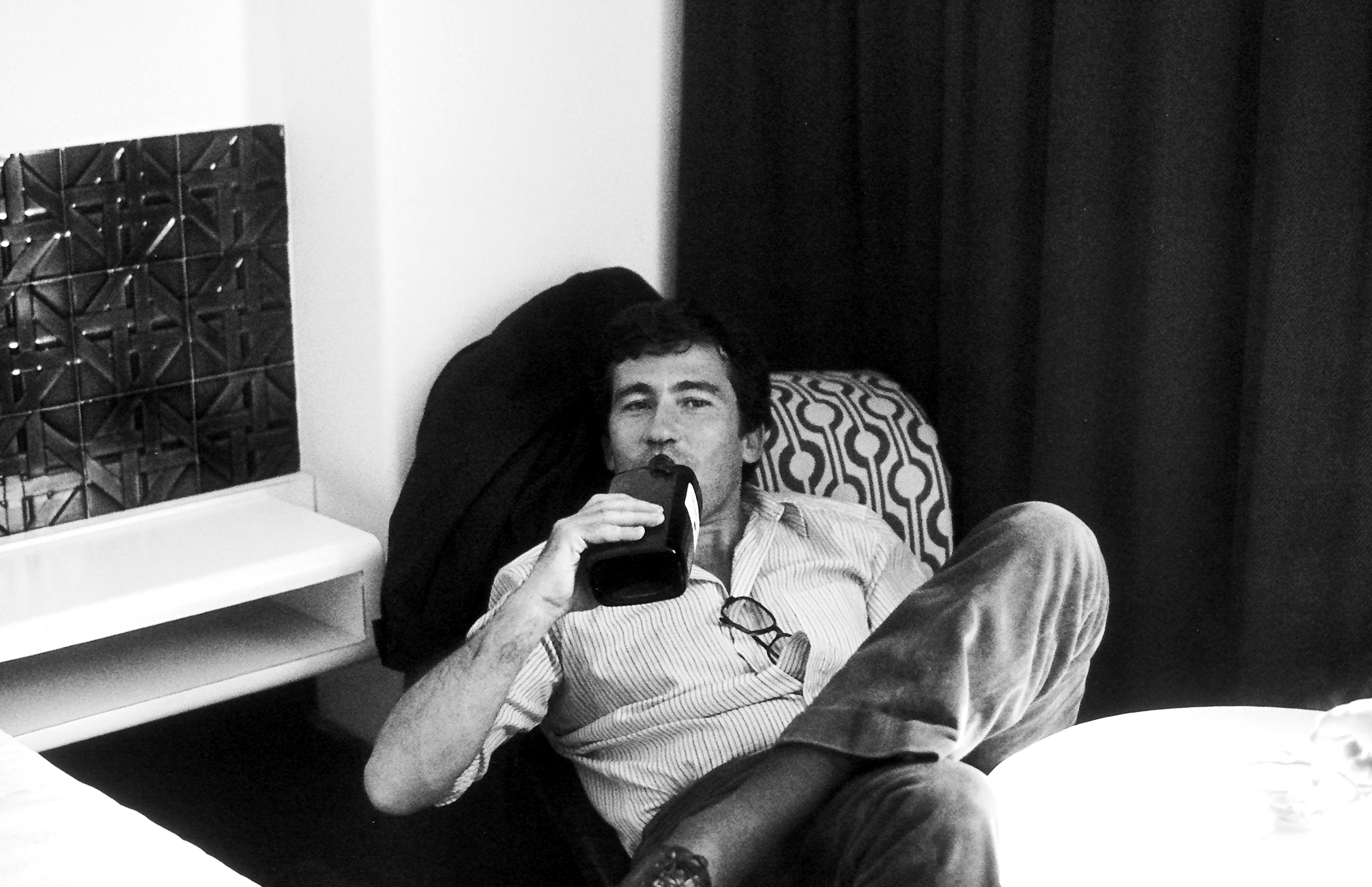
Sánchez Dragó in 1979

Sánchez was a student at the Colegio del Pilar and at the University of Madrid (now known as the Complutense). A member of the Communist Party of Spain in his youth, he was imprisoned because of his opposition to Francoist Spain and was in exile for seven years.

Sánchez Dragó participated along with other figures linked to Spanish Nouvelle Droite in the Manifesto Against the Death of the Spirit and the Earth in 2002, later forming the Asociación Manifiesto, a meeting point of old and new reactionaries as well as former neo-Nazi group CEDADE members.

Labelled a "new reactionary", he however described himself as an individualist libertarian anarchist. The author of more than 45 books, he won the 1979 Premio Nacional de Ensayo for his essay Gárgoris y Habidis. Una historia mágica de España. This work has been criticised because of its antisemitic content, mostly attacking Ashkenazi Jews.

Sánchez Dragó also won the 1992 Premio Planeta for his novel La prueba del laberinto and the 2006 Fernando Lara Novel Award for his book based on the life and death of his father, Muertes paralelas.

In a 2010 work entitled Dios los cría... y ellos hablan de sexo, drogas, España, corrupción..., Sánchez Dragó bragged about having had sex with two thirteen year-old minors during his time in Japan in 1967.

A noted endorsement in the meeting of the far-right political party Vox celebrated in the Palacio Vistalegre in October 2018, he vowed to support 90% of the party political programme.

Sánchez Dragó died on 10 April 2023, at age 86, after suffering a heart attack at his residence in Castilfrío de la Sierra.

== Works ==
- España viva (Muchnik Editores, 1967)
- Gárgoris y Habidis|Gárgoris y Habidis. Una Historia mágica de España (Libros Hiperión, 1978)
- La España mágica: Epítome de Gárgoris y Habidis (Alianza Editorial, 1983)
- Eldorado (Editorial Planeta, 1984)
- Finisterre. Sobre viajes, travesías, naufragios y navegaciones with Fernando Savater, Luis Racionero, Ramón Buenaventura, José María Álvarez, José María Poveda, Luis Paniagua, José María de Areilza, Pedro Martínez Montálvez, Marcos-Ricardo Barnatán, Xavier Domingo, Valentín Paz Andrade y Antonio Gala (Editorial Planeta, 1984)
- Ideas para una nueva política cultural (Ediciones Almar, 1984)
- Fernando Sánchez Dragó. Una vida mágica (with Joaquín Arnáiz) (Anjana Ediciones, 1985)
- Las fuentes del Nilo: protocolos del camino de Damasco (Editorial Planeta, 1986)
- Del priscilianismo al liberalismo. Doble salto sin red (Editorial Prensa y Ediciones Iberoamericanas, 1987)
- Volapié. Toros y tauromagia (Espasa-Calpe, 1987)
- La gnosis o en conocimiento de lo oculto (Universidad Complutense de Madrid, 1989)
- El camino del corazón (Editorial Planeta, 1990)
- Diario de un guerrero. La Dragontea, I (Editorial Planeta, 1992)
- La prueba del laberinto (Editorial Planeta, 1992)
- Calendario espiritual (Temas de Hoy, 1992)
- Discurso numantino. Segunda y última salida de los ingeniosos hidalgos Gárgoris y Habidis (Editorial Planeta, 1995)
- La del alba sería. Mis encuentros con lo invisible (Editorial Planeta, 1996)
- Diccionario de la España Mágica (with Antonio Ruiz Vega) (Espasa-Calpe, 1997)
- En el alambre de Shiva. La Dragontea, II (Editorial Planeta, 1997)
- El camino hacia Ítaca. La Dragontea, III (Editorial Planeta, 1998)
- Historia mágica del Camino de Santiago (Editorial Planeta, 1999)
- Carta de Jesús al Papa (Editorial Planeta, 2001)
- El Sendero de la Mano Izquierda (Martínez Roca, 2002)
- Sentado alegre en la popa. La Dragontea, IV (Editorial Planeta, 2004)
- Kokoro: A vida o muerte. Dragó entrevista a Dragó (La Esfera de los Libros, 2005)
- Muertes paralelas (Editorial Planeta, 2006)
- Libertad, fraternidad, desigualdad. Derechazos with Antonio Ruiz Vega (Editorial Áltera, 2007)
- Diario de la Noche. Los textos más polémicos del informativo nocturno más personal (Editorial Planeta, 2007)
- Y si habla mal de España... es español (Editorial Planeta, 2008)
- Soseki. Inmortal y tigre (Editorial Planeta, 2009)
- Dios los cría...y ellos hablan de sexo, drogas, España, corrupción... with Albert Boadella (Editorial Planeta, 2010)
- El lobo feroz (Editorial Áltera, 2011)
- Esos días azules. Memorias de un niño raro (Editorial Planeta, 2011)
- Pacto de sangre with Ayanta Barilli (Editorial Planeta, 2013)
- La canción de Roldán: Crimen y castigo (Editorial Planeta, 2015)
- Shangri-La: El elixir de la eterna juventud (Editorial Planeta, 2016)
- Santiago Abascal. España vertebrada (Editorial Planeta, 2019)
- España guadaña. Arderéis como en el 36 (con prefacio de Juan Eslava Galán y epílogo de Fernando Arrabal) (Editorial Almuzara, 2019)
- Galgo corredor. Los años guerreros. 1953-1964 (Editorial Planeta, 2020)
- Habáname (Harkonnen Books, 2021)
- Un paseo por el honor y la muerte (Editorial Almuzara, 2022)

== Awards ==
- Adopted Son of Soria (1992)
