= Luis Racionero =

Spanish writer (1940–2020)

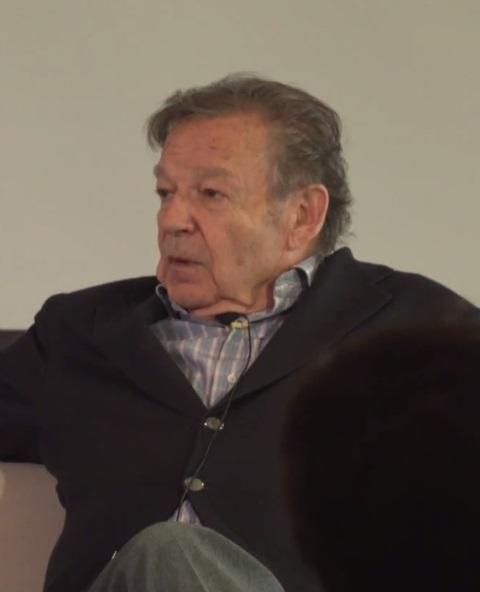
Luis Racionero (2015).

Luis Racionero i Grau (15 January 1940 – 8 March 2020) was a Spanish essayist.

He was born in la Seu d'Urgell, Lleida, and studied engineering and economics at the University of Barcelona and urban studies at the University of California Berkeley. He was director of Spain's national library and of the Spanish College (Colegio de España) in Paris. He worked with newspapers including El País, La Vanguardia and Mundo Deportivo. He wrote both in Catalan and in Spanish.

In 1999 he won the Fernando Lara Novel Award for his then-unpublished work La sonrisa de la Gioconda.

== Works ==
- Filosofías del underground (Philosophies of the underground), 1977
- Sistemas de ciudades y ordenación del territorio (Systems of cities and planning), 1978
- Leonardo da Vinci, 1978
- Cercamón, 1981
- Del paro al ocio (From unemployment to leisure), 1983
- Textos de estética taoísta (Texts of Taoist aesthetics), 1983
- El Mediterráneo y los bárbaros del Norte (The Mediterranean and the barbarians of the North) (1985 and 1996)
- La forja de l'exili (The forging of the Exiles) (1985)
- Los ángeles cuánticos (Quantum Angels) (1986)
- Arte y ciencia (Art and Science) (1988)
- El Arte de Vivir (The Art of Living) (1989)
- Florencia de los Médicis (Florence of the Medicis) (1990)
- Atenas de Pericles (Athens of Pericles) (1993)
- Oriente y Occidente: Filosofía oriental y dilemas occidentales (East and West: Eastern Philosophy and Western dilemmas) (1993)
- El arte de escribir (The art of writing) (1995)
- La cárcel del amor (Prison of Love) (1996)
- El genio del lugar (The genius of the place) (1997)
- Guía Práctica para Insatisfechos: Valores, Política y Futuro (Practical Guide to Values, Politics and the Future) (1997)
- El progreso decadente (Decadent Progress) (2000) (Espasa - Essay Prize, Premio Espasa de Ensayo)
- El pecado original (Original Sin) (2001)
- La Costa Brava recuperada (Costa Brava recovered) (2000)
- El alquimista trovador: una fascinante novela histórica sobre Rai Mundo Lulio (Trovador the alchemist: a fascinating historical novel about World Lulio Rai) (2003)
- La sonrisa de la Gioconda (Mona Lisa's smile) (2004)
- Conversaciones con Pla y Dalí (Conversations with Pla and Dalí) (2004)
- El libro de los pequeños placeres (The Book of Small Pleasures) (2005)
- Los complejos de la derecha (The complex on the right) (2006)
- Leonardo Da Vinci: genio del Renacimiento (Leonardo Da Vinci: genius of the Renaissance) (2006)
- Sobrevivir a un gran amor seis veces -Memorias- (2009)
