= Jorge Verstrynge =

Spanish politician, activist and political scientist

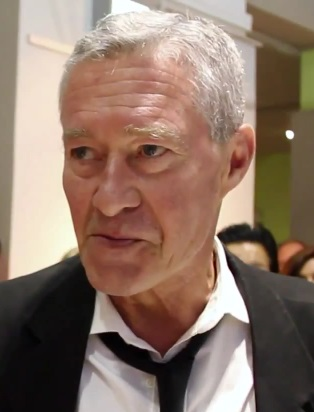
- Verstrynge in 2013

Secretary General of People's Alliance
- In office 1979–1986
- Preceded by: Manuel Fraga
- Succeeded by: Alberto Ruiz-Gallardón

Member of the Congress of Deputies
- In office 1982–1989
- Constituency: Seville and Madrid

Personal details
- Born: 22 September 1948 Tangier, Tangier International Zone
- Party: AP; PSOE
- Spouse: Mercedes Revuelta
- Children: Lilith Verstrynge

Jorge Verstrynge Rojas (born September 22, 1948) is a Spanish former politician, activist and political scientist, professor in the Complutense University of Madrid. Close to neofascist movements in his youth and Secretary-General of People's Alliance in the 1980s, he experimented along his political career an ideological switch towards leftist positions.

== Biography ==
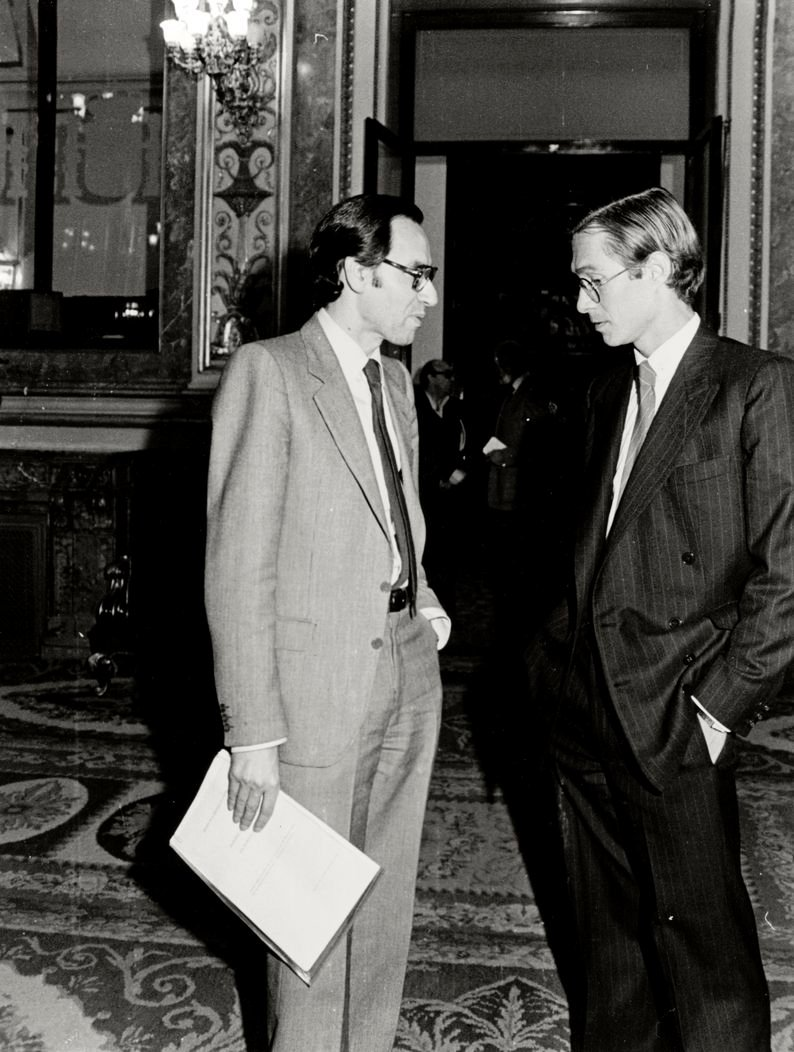
Talking to Alfonso Guerra in 1982

Born 22 September 1948 in Tangier, he is son of a Spanish mother and a Belgian father, Willy Verstrynge-Thalloen, follower of Léon Degrelle during the Second World War. During his youth in Morocco and Algeria he was also influenced by his stepfather, a French communist called René Mazel. He moved from France to Spain in order to finish his secondary education and entering the University. He became one of the proponents of Nouvelle Droite ideas within People's Alliance (AP). (Note: According to César Vidal, he was allegedly close to CEDADE neo-Nazi group before becoming Secretary General of People's Alliance. Xavier Casals argues his entry in the Spanish extreme right scene —despite signing an article in the CEDADE journal (actually a work by his father)— was not actually through the CEDADE ranks.) Secretary General of AP from 1979 to 1986, he was considered the protégé of Manuel Fraga, leader of the party. He also was, within People's Alliance, one of the promoters of the Club del Sable ("Club of the Sabre").

He ran as AP's Mayoral candidate in the 1983 Madrid City Council election, but his candidature was beaten by the Spanish Socialist Workers' Party (PSOE), led by the Mayor Enrique Tierno Galván. After a rift with Fraga, he left AP in 1986; he became member of the PSOE in 1993. He left the party, and became advisor of Francisco Frutos, leader of the United Left. In 2014 he became an advisor of Pablo Iglesias, leader of Podemos.

== Bibliography ==
- Barbó, Jorge (2014-06-21). "Los extremos de Verstrynge". El Correo. Archived from the original on 2017-05-18.
- Casals, Xavier (1995). Neonazis en España. De las audiciones wagnerianas a los skinheads (1966-1995). Barcelona: Grijalbo. ISBN 84-253-2804-7.
- Chicote, J. (16 April 2016). "Verstrynge, de neofascista a «aliado natural de la revolución bolivariana". ABC.
- González Castillejos, Jorge (2014). "Gestación y desarrollo de Alianza Popular en la provincia de Ciudad Real durante los años de la Transición (1976-1982)" (PDF). Cuadernos de Estudios Manchegos (39): 121–146. ISSN 0526-2623. Archived from the original (PDF) on 2015-07-23.
- González Cuevas, Pedro Carlos (2009). "Las "otras" derechas en la España actual: teólogos, "racionalistas" y neoderechistas". Bulletin d'histoire contemporaine de l'Espagne (44). Université de Provence: 263–278. ISSN 0987-4135.
- Rodríguez, Antonio (2014). "La insólita evolución política de Verstrynge". Tiempo de Hoy. ISSN 0213-1951. Archived from the original on September 14, 2014.
- Vidal, César (2000). "El antisemitismo en la España contemporánea". Los judíos en la España contemporánea: Historia y visiones, 1898-1998. In: Uriel Macías Kapón, Yolanda Moreno Koch, Ricardo Izquierdo Benito (Eds.). Universidad de Castilla-La Mancha. ISBN 9788484270447.
- Vicent, Manuel (1983-05-07). "Jorge Verstrynge o el ardor". El País.
