= 2006 in Spanish television =

This is a list of Spanish television related events in 2006.

== Events ==
- 15 February: Regional Channel Canal Extremadura Televisión starts broadcasting.
- 27 March: Nationwide TV Channel La Sexta starts broadcasting.
- 14 April: Regional Channel 7 Región de Murcia starts broadcasting.
- 21 April: Regional Channel Aragón Televisión starts broadcasting.
- 1 June: TV channel Syfy starts broadcasting.
- 2 June: Telecinco purchases 15% shares of Miramón Mendi, property of José Luis Moreno.
- 5 June: The Parliament of Spain passes the New State-owned Television and Radio Act.
- 10 July – Crime & Investigation is last.
- 15 September – La 7 starts broadcasting.
- October: Libertad Digital TV Channel starts broadcasting.
- 28 October: 50 anniversary of TVE, and henceforth television in Spain.

== Debuts ==
Title	Channel	Debut	Performers/Host	Genre
1 contra 100	Antena 3	2006-12-23	Juan y Medio	Quiz Show
Ácaros	Cuatro	2006-12-26	Paco León	Sitcom
Adivina quién gana esta noche	Antena 3	2006-11-17	Sara Márquez	Call TV
A pelo	La Sexta	2006-07-14	Joaquín Reyes	Comedy
La actualidad en 2D	La Sexta	2006-04-02	Helena Resano	Talking Show
Alta tensión	Cuatro	2006-01-30	Luis Larrodera	Quiz Show
Amar el cine	La 2	2006-09-30		Movies
Amistades peligrosas	Cuatro	2006-12-25	Miquel Fernández	Drama Series
Amor en la red	Cuatro	2006-07-24	Aitor Trigos	Dating show
El analista catódico	La Sexta	2006-03-29	Agustín Jiménez	Videos
¡Apaga la luz!	La 1	2006-03-21	Janfri Topera	Science/Culture
Apuesta en 20	La Sexta	2006-04-01	Javi Martín	Quiz Show
Aquí se gana	Telecinco	2006-08-25		Call TV
Así se grabó	La 1	2006-06-16		Music
Bailes de salón	La 1	2006-07-14	Javier Castillo	Talent show
Batuka	Telecinco	2006-07-22	Jessica Expósito	Sports
Bichos y Cía	La Sexta	2006-04-01	Michelle Jenner	Videos
Brigada policial	La Sexta	2006-03-31	Juan Ramón Lucas	Sucesos
Buenas noches y buena suerte	Antena 3	2006-05-30	Anna Simon	Call TV
El buscador de historias	Telecinco	2006-02-05	Emilio Pineda	Investigation
Cambio de clase	Disney Channel	2006-09-11	Andrea Guasch	Youth
¿Cantas o qué?	Antena 3	2006-02-07	Paula Vázquez	Talent show
Carta blanca	La 2	2006-05-24		Talk Show
La casa de cristal	Cuatro	2006-04-24	Ana García Lozano	Reality show
El Club de Flo	La Sexta	2006-03-31	Florentino Fernández	Comedy
Con Arús...TAG	La 1	2006-03-23	Alfonso Arús	Comedy
Con dos tacones	La 1	2006-03-23	Rosario Pardo	Sitcom
El coro de la cárcel	La 1	2006-07-01	Muntsa Rius	Talent show
Creadores del siglo XX	La 2	2006-06-18		Documentary
Crimen a las 10	Antena 3	2006-10-12		Movies
Cuatro x Cuatro	Cuatro	2006-03-08	Iñaki Gabilondo	News
La Dársena de Poniente	La 1	2006-10-07	Sancho Gracia	Drama Series
D-Calle	La 2	2006-11-23	Cayetana Guillén Cuervo	Variety Show
El desafío bajo cero	Telecinco	2006-09-13	Manel Fuentes	Talent show
La dieta mediterránea	La 2	2006-05-06	Antonia Martínez López	Science/Culture
Dímelo al oído	La Sexta	2006-07-11	Eva González	Dating show
Divinos	Antena 3	2006-07-03	Santi Millán	Sitcom
Documenta2	La 2	2006-01-13		Movies
Duelo de chefs	Cuatro	2006-01-23	Iria Castro	Cooking Show
Elegidos	La Sexta	2006-09-08	Juan Ramón Lucas	Investigation
Ellas y el sexo débil	Antena 3	2006-09-20	Ana Obregón	Sitcom
Empieza el espectáculo	La 1	2006-07-05	Miriam Díaz-Aroca	Talent show
En antena	Antena 3	2006-09-11	Jaime Cantizano	Variety Show
En ruta con la Guía	La 1	2006-05-11		Documentary
Engaño	Telecinco	2006-02-10	Jordi González	Quiz Show
Es fácil	Antena 3	2006-04-09	Teresa Viejo	Science/Culture
Esta cocina es un infierno	Telecinco	2006-02-09	Carolina Ferre	Cooking Show
Esto es increíble	Telecinco	2006-11-17	Carolina Cerezuela	Videos
Extra	La 1	2006-03-01	Tonino	Comedy
Family Rock	Cuatro	2006-07-15	Nico Abad	Quiz Show
Fuera de control	La 1	2006-01-26	Amparo Larrañaga	Sitcom
Fusión sonora	Telecinco	2006-12-18		Music
Génesis: En la mente del asesino	Cuatro	2006-05-03	Quim Gutiérrez	Drama Series
Habitación 623	La Sexta	2006-02-27	Olga Viza	Talk Show
Hasta que la tele nos separe	La 1	2006-07-03	Paz Padilla	Comedy
Hijos del corazón	La 1	2006-11-10		Docudrama
Hora cero	La 1	2006-09-19		Investigation
El hormiguero	Cuatro	2006-09-24	Pablo Motos	Talk Show
Hoy cocinas tú	La Sexta	2006-03-27	Eva Arguiñano	Cooking Show
La imagen de tu vida	La 1	2006-09-14	Jesús Hermida	Videos
El intermedio	La Sexta	2006-03-30	El Gran Wyoming	Comedy
iPop	La 2	2006-01-23	La China Patiño	Music
Los irrepetibles	La Sexta	2006-03-26	Emilio Aragón	Comedy
Juicio de parejas	La Sexta	2006-09-27	Yolanda Vázquez	Talk Show
Leonart	La 2	2006-10-02	Jesús Labanda	Children
Libertad vigilada	Antena 3	2006-07-10	Toñi Moreno	Reality show
Llama y gana	Telecinco	2006-08-02		Call TV
Lo que inTeresa	Antena 3	2006-01-09	María Teresa Campos	Talking Show
El loco de la colina	La 1	2006-01-17	Jesús Quintero	Talk Show
Madrid opina	Telemadrid	2006-10-10	Ernesto Sáenz de Buruaga	Talking Show
Manolo y Benito Corporeision	Antena 3	2006-12-25	Carlos Iglesias	Sitcom
Las mañanas de Cuatro	Cuatro	2006-10-04	Concha García Campoy	Variety Show
Martes cine	Antena 3	2006-05-16		Movies
Matrimonio con hijos	Cuatro	2006-05-14	Ginés García Millán	Sitcom
Meridianos	La 2	2006-04-03		Documentary
Mesa para cinco	La Sexta	2006-09-11	Elena Ballesteros	Sitcom
Mi abuelo es el mejor	La 1	2006-03-01	Concha Velasco	Quiz Show
Mira lo que ven	La 1	2006-08-10	Daniel Domenjó	Videos
Morancos Channel Nº 5	Telecinco	2006-02-12	Los Morancos	Comedy
Mujeres	La 2	2006-09-18	Chiqui Fernández	Sitcom
El mundo de Chema	Cuatro	2006-09-18	Carlos Latre	Sitcom
Nada x aquí	Cuatro	2006-03-25	Jorge Blass	Magic
No sabe, no contesta	La Sexta	2006-02-27	Miki Nadal	Quiz Show
Nos pierde la fama	Cuatro	2006-04-27	Nuria Roca	Gossip Show
Odiosas	La 1	2006-05-01	Laura Manzanedo	Sitcom
Un país de chiste	La Sexta	2006-07-10	Óscar Terol	Comedy
Panorama de la Historia	La 2	2006-06-04		Documentary
Planeta Finito	La Sexta	2006-03-26		Documentary
Pocholo Ibiza 06	La Sexta	2006-07-03	Pocholo Martínez-Bordiú	Reality show
El primero de la clase	La 1	2006-09-26	Antonio Hidalgo	Quiz Show
Protagonistas en el recuerdo	La 1	2006-12-24		Documentary
Sábado Dolce Vita	Telecinco	2006-08-06	Santi Acosta	Comedy
Sábado noche	La 1	2006-01-14	Josema Yuste	Music
Sé lo que hicisteis la última semana	La Sexta	2006-02-09	Patricia Conde	Comedy
La Sexta Noticias	La Sexta	2006-09-11	Mamen Mendizábal	News
Sexto sentido	La Sexta	2006-11-20	Mamen Mendizábal	News
El show de Cándido	La Sexta	2006-04-16	Julián Weich	Reality show
Los simuladores	Cuatro	2006-03-26	Antonio Garrido	Drama Series
SMS: Sin Miedo a Soñar	La Sexta	2006-07-07	Lola Marceli	Drama Series
Superhuman	Cuatro	2006-04-28	Raquel Sánchez-Silva	Reality show
Supernanny	Cuatro	2006-02-24	Rocío Ramos-Paúl	Reality show
Supervillanos	La Sexta	2006-03-30	Miguel Ortiz	Sitcom
Supervivientes: Perdidos en el Caribe	Telecinco	2006-05-02	Jesús Vázquez	Reality show
Tal para cual	Antena 3	2006-04-26	Anabel Alonso	Quiz Show
Teatro en La 2	La 2	2006-08-23		Theater
Telecinco ¿dígame?	Telecinco	2006-11-25		Call TV
Teleobjetivo	La 1	2006-04-11	Daniel Domenjó	Investigation
Teletipos	Telecinco	2006-08-08	El Tricicle	Comedy
Territorio Comanche	Telemadrid	2006-02-02	Cristina Tárrega	Late Night
Territorio Champions	Antena 3	2006-08-24	Manu Sánchez	Sports
Ticket	La Sexta	2006-04-01	Ruth Jiménez	Variety Show
Tirando a dar	Telecinco	2006-04-23	Fernando Guillén Cuervo	Sitcom
Todos ahhh cien	La Sexta	2006-04-01	Josep Tomás	Science/Culture
El traidor	Cuatro	2006-07-12	Luis Larrodera	Quiz Show
Vamos de ti3ndas	Antena 3	2006-06-26	Mónica Pont	Teleshopping
El video del 1.000.000 de euros	La Sexta	2006-07-03	Yolanda Ramos	Videos
Vientos de agua	Telecinco	2006-01-03	Ernesto Alterio	Drama Series
Yo soy Bea	Telecinco	2006-07-10	Ruth Núñez	Soap Opera

== Television shows ==
- La 1
  - Telediario (1957– )
  - Informe Semanal (1973– )
  - Parlamento (1978–2014)
  - Telepasión española (1990– )
  - Corazón, Corazón (1993–2010)
  - Cartelera (1994–2009)
  - Los Desayunos de TVE (1994–2020)
  - Cine de barrio (1995– )
  - Gente (1995–2011)
  - Corazón (1997– )
  - Saber vivir (1997–2009)
  - El Conciertazo (2000–2009)
  - Cuéntame cómo pasó (2001– )
  - Por la mañana (2002–2008)
  - 59 segundos (2004–2012)
  - Destino Eurovisión (2004–2013)
  - Emprendedores (2005–2008)
  - ¡Mira quién baila! (2005–2009)
  - España Directo (2005–2022)
  - Amar en tiempos revueltos (2005–2012)
- Antena 3
  - Antena 3 Noticias (1990– )
  - Club Megatrix (1995–2013)
  - Espejo público (1996– )
  - El Diario de Patricia (2001–2008)
  - Homo Zapping (2003–2007)
  - 7 días, 7 noches (2003–2007)
  - ¿Dónde estás, corazón? (2003–2011)
  - La Hora de la verdad (2004–2007)
  - Buenafuente (2005–2007)
  - ¿Quién quiere ser millonario? (2005–2008)
  - Art Attack (2005–2009)
  - Los Hombres de Paco (2005–2010)
- La 2
  - Al filo de lo imposble (1982– )
  - Pueblo de Dios (1982– )
  - Últimas preguntas (1983– )
  - En portada (1984– )
  - Estadio 2 (1984–2007)
  - Metrópolis (1985– )
  - Documentos TV (1986– )
  - Tendido cero (1986– )
  - Días de cine (1991– )
  - Línea 900 (1991–2007)
  - La Aventura del saber (1992– )
  - Jara y sedal (1992– )
  - Zona ACB (1993–2010)
  - La 2 noticias (1994–2020)
  - La noche temática, (1995– )
  - Redes (1996–2013)
  - Agrosfera (1997– )
  - El escarabajo verde (1997– )
  - Saber y ganar (1997– )
  - En otras palabras (1997–2008)
  - La Mandrágora (1997–2009)
  - El Cine de La 2 (1998– )
  - Versión española (1998– )
  - Aquí hay trabajo (2000– )
  - España en comunidad (2000–2020)
  - Shalom (2003– )
  - Los Lunnis (2003–2010)
  - Padres en apuros (2003–2010)
  - Islam hoy (2003–2016)
  - De cerca (2004–2007)
  - Enfoque (2004–2007)
  - Estravagario (2004–2007)
  - Pocoyo (2005– )
  - El Rondo (2005–2007)
  - Con todos los acentos (2005–2009)
  - Palabra por palabra (2005–2011)
- Cuatro
  - Cuarto milenio (2005– )
  - Cuatrosfera (2005–2007)
  - Surferos TV (2005–2007)
  - Todos contra el chef (2005–2007)
  - Channel nº4 (2005–2008)
  - Noche Hache (2005–2008)
  - Las noticias del guiñol (2005–2008)
  - Corta-t (2005–2009)
  - Callejeros (2005–2014)
  - Noticias Cuatro (2005–2019)
- Telecinco
  - Informativos Telecinco (1990– )
  - Caiga quien caiga (1996–2008)
  - La Mirada crítica (1998–2009)
  - El comisario (1999–2009)
  - Nosolomúsica (1999–2012)
  - Survivor Spain (2000– )
  - Hospital Central (2000–2012)
  - Big Brother Spain (2000–2017)
  - A tu lado (2002–2007)
  - Estrenos de cartelera (2002–2007)
  - Aquí hay tomate (2003–2008)
  - Los Serrano (2003–2008)
  - Bricomanía (2005–2010)
  - Decogarden (2005–2010)
  - Operación Triunfo (2005–2011)
  - La casa de tu vida (2004–2007)
  - TNT (2004–2007)
  - ¡Allá tú! (2004–2008)
  - Birlokus klub (2004–2008)
  - Karlos Arguiñano en tu cocina (2004–2010)
  - Diario de (2004–2011)
  - Gran Hermano VIP (2004–2019)
  - El Programa de Ana Rosa (2005– )
  - Camera Café (2005–2009)
  - Aída (2005–2014)

== Ending this year ==
- La 1
  - Juan y José show (2004–2006)
  - Música uno (2004–2006)
  - Ankawa (2005–2006)
  - Ruffus & Navarro Unplugged (2005–2006)
  - Tan a gustito (2005–2006)
- La 2
  - La Botica de la abuela (1997–2006)
  - España Innova (2005–2006)
  - Crónicas (2004–2006)
  - Miradas 2 (2004–2006)
- Antena 3
  - Ahora (2000–2006)
  - Aquí no hay quien viva (2003–2006)
  - Los Más (2004–2006)
  - Mis adorables vecinos (2004–2006)
  - Pelopicopata (2004–2006)
  - Ruedo ibérico (2004–2006)
  - A tortas con la vida (2005–2006)
  - Estoy por ti (2005–2006)
- Cuatro
  - 1 Equipo (2005–2006)
  - Six-Pack (2005–2006)
  - Maracaná 05 (2005–2006)
  - ¡Oído Cocina! (2005–2006)
  - Soy el que más sabe de televisión del mundo (2005–2006)
- Telecinco
  - 7 vidas (1999–2006)
  - Salsa rosa (2002–2006)
  - Agitación + IVA (2005–2006)

== Changes of network affiliation ==
Show	Moved From	Moved To
El precio justo (1988–2021)	La 1	Antena 3
Alta tensión (1998– )	Antena 3	Cuatro
La ruleta de la fortuna (1990– )	Telecinco	Antena 3
Survivor Spain (2000– )	Antena 3	Telecinco

== Foreign series debuts in Spain ==
English title	Spanish title	Original title	Channel	Country	Performers
According to Jim	El mundo según Jim		La Sexta	USA	Jim Belushi
Bones	Bones		La Sexta	USA	Emily Deschanel
Boston Public	Profesores en Boston		La Sexta	USA	Jessalyn Gilsig
Commander in Chief	Señora Presidenta		La Sexta	USA	Geena Davis
---	Contra viento y marea	Contra viento y marea	Antena 3	MEX	Marlene Favela, Sebastián Rulli
Criminal Minds	Mentes criminales		Telecinco	USA	Mandy Patinkin
Dead Like Me	Tan muertos como yo		Cuatro	USA	Ellen Muth
Doctor Who	Doctor Who		People+Arts	GBR	
E-Ring	El Anillo E		La Sexta	USA	Benjamin Bratt
Everybody Hates Chris	Todo el mundo odia a Chris		Cuatro	USA	Tyler James Williams
Flying Rhino Junior High	Instituto del rinoceronte		Antena 3	CAN	
Ghost Whisperer	Entre fantasmas		Cuatro	USA	Jennifer Love Hewitt
House	House		Cuatro	USA	Hugh Laurie
---	La fea más bella	La fea más bella	Antena 3	MEX	Angélica Vale
---	La madrastra	La madastra	Antena 3	MEX	Victoria Ruffo
My Name is Earl	Me llamo Earl		La Sexta	USA	Jason Lee
NCIS	Navy: Investigación criminal		La Sexta	USA	Mark Harmon
Numb3rs	Numb3rs		Antena 3	USA	Rob Morrow
---	El Príncipe Mackaroo	Ojarumaru	Telecinco	JAP	
Prison Break	Prison Break		La Sexta	USA	Wentworth Miller, Dominic Purcell
Queer as Folk	Queer as Folk		Cuatro	USA	Gale Harold
---	Rebelde	Rebelde	Antena 3	MEX	Enrique Rocha
---	Rubí	Rubí	Antena 3	MEX	Bárbara Mori
The Closer	The Closer		Cuatro	USA	Kyra Sedgwick
UFO Baby	UFO Baby	Dā! Dā! Dā!	Telecinco	JAP	
Weeds	Weeds		Canal+	USA	Mary-Louise Parker

== Deaths ==
- 30 January – Lola Cardona, actress, 70.
- 25 March – Rocío Dúrcal, singer, 61.
- 27 May – Alfonso Lussón, actor, 65.
- 1 June – Rocío Jurado, singer, 61.
- 7 August – Ángel de Andrés, actor, 88.
- 6 November – Mara Goyanes, actress, 64.
- 9 December – Lauren Postigo, host, 78.
- 16 December – Enric Arredondo, actor, 66.

== See also ==
- 2006 in Spain
- List of Spanish films of 2006
