= Àngels Barceló =

Spanish radio presenter (born 1963)

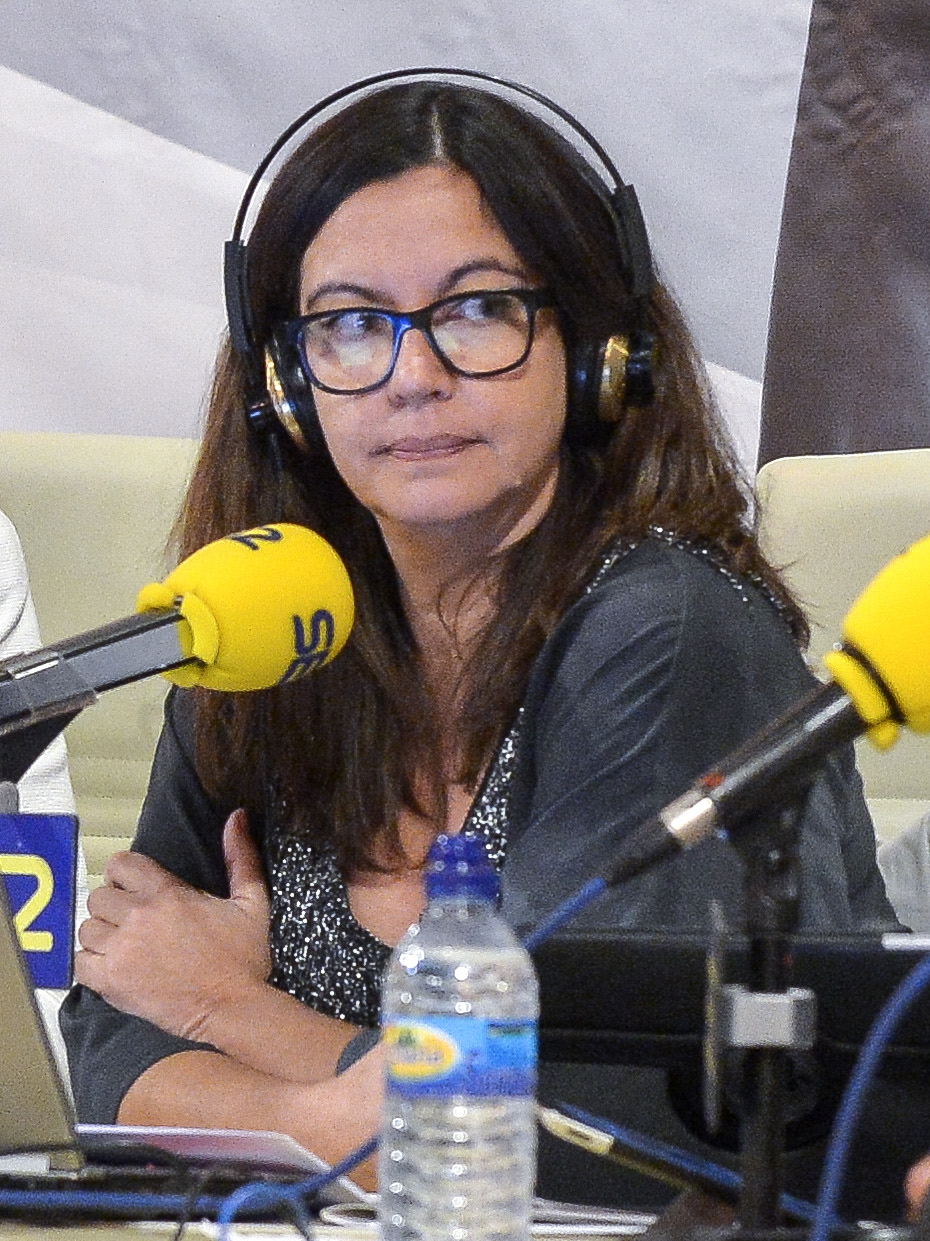
- Barceló in 2015
- Born: María de los Ángeles Barceló Suárez; 7 September 1963 (age 62); Barcelona, Spain
- Occupation: Radio presenter
- Years active: 1983–present
- Employers: Catalunya Ràdio; (1983–1997); Televisió de Catalunya; (1984–1997); Telecinco; (1997–2005); Cadena SER; (2005–present)

María de los Ángeles Barceló Suárez (Barcelona, Spain; born September 7, 1963) better known as Àngels Barceló is a Spanish presenter and broadcaster specialized in informative and informative programs and magazines with an extensive career in audiovisual media.

== Career ==
She studied journalism at the Autonomous University of Barcelona but did not finish her studies, since her professional career began at the age of twenty (1983), working as a news editor at the radio station Catalunya Ràdio. The following year, without leaving the radio, she made the leap to television to present the news on TV3. She participated in the broadcasting of important events, such as election nights (national and American), the Gulf War, the signing of the Maastricht Treaty or the nomination of Barcelona as Olympic host city. She has become the director of the last edition of the news program of this autonomous channel. In addition, she was also responsible for Àngels de nit, an interview program.

It was not until 1997 when she appeared for the first time in front of the cameras of a state television: after spending half a year as editor of Telecinco's weekend news, she went on to edit and present the 14:30 news. And in 2001, after the departure of Juan Ramón Lucas, she went on to edit and present Informativos Telecinco at 8:30 pm. During this stage, she participated as a special envoy to the Yugoslavian War, the elections in the United States, the death of Pope John Paul II or in a much more active way during the Prestige catastrophe, in which the news of the channel was carried out live from the Galician coast affected by the tide of the ship. It will be the then and current director of Telecinco's news who will take the reins of the program.

In 2005, tired of living in Madrid while her family remained in Barcelona, she decided to take a professional turn in her career by signing with Cadena SER to direct and present the weekend magazine show A vivir que son dos días, a program she hosted from Ràdio Barcelona.

On November 15, 2007, during the annual meeting of directors of Cadena SER she was chosen to replace Carlos Llamas (who died in October 2007) at the helm of the daily news magazine Hora 25, a task she began to perform on January 7, 2008, from Radio Madrid. Since then, she has kept the program as a prominent leader; obtaining in the 3rd wave of the EGM of 2009 an average audience of 1,460,000 listeners compared to 443,000 fans of the next most listened program in its slot: La Brújula at Onda Cero.

Grupo PRISA in association with W Radio Colombia and W Radio Radio broadcast in Colombia and Mexico, respectively, the program Hora 25 Global from 2008 to 2012. The program was directed by Barceló and produced by Cadena SER. It discussed international current affairs with guests and correspondents from all PRISA Radio stations. Since September 2, 2019, she has been directing and presenting Hoy por hoy, on Cadena SER, from 06h00 to 12h20 a.m., Monday to Friday.

Since joining the radio subsidiary of the PRISA group, she has combined radio with regular appearances on the television subsidiary of this multimedia group, although she also briefly presented during the last quarter of 2005 a weekly news magazine entitled 180º on the Catalan regional television channel TV3.

From March to June 2006, she presented once a month, alternating with Carles Francino, Iñaki Gabilondo and Jon Sistiaga, the current affairs show Cuatro x Cuatro on Cuatro, Sogecable's general-interest channel. Also on Cuatro during the 2006 World Cup she presented, along with Nico Abad, the programs Zona Cuatro, which included the pre-match and post-match coverage of the Spanish National Team in the World Cup, and Maracaná Germany 06, which summarized all the matches of the World Cup; both programs were broadcast on an outdoor set in the Plaza de Colón in the city of Madrid. She has also broadcast for Canal+, Sogecable's premium channel, the Oscar Awards in 2006, 2007, 2008 and 2009.

During the Euro 2008, together with Nico Abad, she presented for Cuatro from the Plaza de Colón in Madrid the special edition of Zona Cuatro on the occasion of the special coverage that was deployed to broadcast the European Championship.

On July 12, 2010, she hosted the special program South Africa 2010: Cuatro con la Roja, broadcast simultaneously by Cuatro and Canal+ on the occasion of the official receptions, reception in the streets of Madrid and final party for the Spanish National Team after winning the 2010 World Cup. The live broadcast lasted from 4:30 p.m. to 12:30 a.m., with the end of the party in Príncipe Pío, placing the channel in third place in the prime time audience ranking for that day.

In November 2010, she travels to Morocco with a SER team to investigate the violent eviction of the Sahrawi protest camp in El Aaiún, with an undetermined number of deaths and hundreds of injured people. On November 11, 2010, she is interrogated by the Moroccan police for having managed to break the Moroccan news blockade and expelled from Morocco for "having provided false information about her identity and profession".

At the end of 2012, she was hired by the Discovery Max, documentary network to present and narrate Y el mundo cambió (And the world changed). The program consists of four chapters in which dramatizations and interviews show us how an invention (cars, skyscrapers, cell phones) has changed our lives. It premiered on November 27, 2012, at 22h30.

== Controversies ==
In 2009 she was accused by Montserrat Boix, a TVE journalist, of appropriating the work of a colleague from SER's international newsroom by broadcasting an interview with Palestinian President Mahmud Abás, substituting her questions and voice for the questions and voice of Barceló, who had not been present at the conversation.

In 2011, she publicly took responsibility for the dismissal of Carlos Carnicero, although she emphasized that there had been no political mediation in this regard, contrary to what the SER collaborator claimed.

She is a soccer fan, and a supporter of FC Barcelona. In 2012 she criticized sports presenter Sara Carbonero for her repeated mistakes. In the same interview she stated that among female presenters "Physique was important, but it was also important that you knew how to do things well. I think that now this is not taken into account, the physical is what has more weight".

In 2021, during the debate organized by Cadena SER on the Elections to the Assembly of Madrid, between four of the five candidates for the presidency of the autonomous community -(Ángel Gabilondo, PSOE-M; Edmundo Bal, Ciudadanos; Rocío Monasterio, Vox and Pablo Iglesias, Unidas Podemos Izquierda Unida Madrid en Pie)-, rbegged the candidate of Unidas Podemos, Pablo Iglesias, not to leave the debate, when the candidate of VOX, Rocío Monasterio, questioned the death threats that the latter had reported receiving, assuring that an envelope with bullets had arrived by mail. This episode had nothing to do with another later clash between the two leaders over Iglesias' refusal to condemn the incidents against Vox at the Vallecas rally a few days earlier; it was later learned that a person who was part of the Podemos party had been arrested in the altercations. The conciliatory attitude towards Iglesias of the presenter in the conflict of the threats questioned was considered by several commentators a position far removed from impartiality as she was the moderator of the table.

== Awards and nominations ==
- 1997: Finalist of the Cirilo Rodríguez Journalism Award. Nominated.
- 1997: Atea Award for presenting and directing the best news program of the year. Winner.
- 1999: Antena de Oro for presenting the news programs in Telecinco. Winner.
- 1999: TP de Oro. Best Presenter. Nominated.
- Micrófonos de la APEI Award for the coverage of the sinking of the Prestige (shared with Hilario Pino). Winner.
- 2003: Premios ATV. Best News Program Communicator. Nominated.
- 2003: TP de Oro to the best daily news program (collective). Winner.
- 2003: TP de Oro. Best News Program Presenter. Nominated.
- 2004: TP de Oro. Best News Program Presenter. Nominated.
- 2005: Premios ATV. Best News Program Communicator. Winner.
- 2010: Micrófono de Oro. Radio. For presenting and directing Hora 25 on Cadena SER. Winner.
- 2017: V State Award of Social Work, in the modality of Communication, for giving voice to denounce policies, or actions and attitudes that promote equality and social justice. Winner.
- 2017: Premio Ondas. National radio. Winner.
- 2017: Antena de Oro. Winner.
- 2019: XII "Avanzando en Igualdad" Award, granted by the National Executive Committee of the FeSP-UGT-PV. Winner.
