= Marta Fernández Vázquez =

Spanish journalist

Marta Fernández
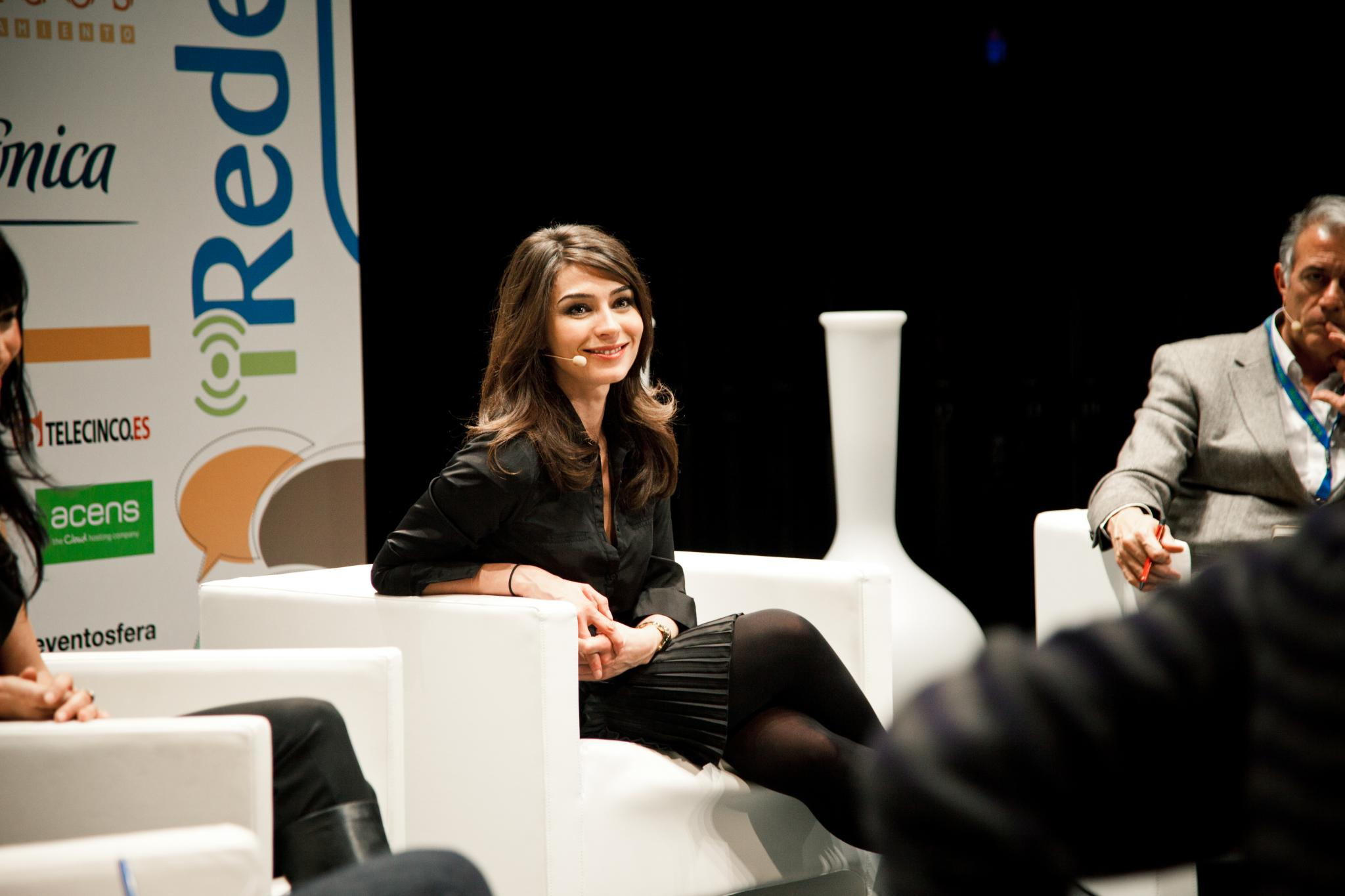
- Fernández in 2012
- Born: Marta Fernández Vázquez; 8 September 1973 (age 52); Madrid, Spain
- Education: Complutense University of Madrid
- Occupations: Journalist and writer
- Years active: 1998–present

Marta Fernández Vázquez (born September 8, 1973) is a Spanish journalist and writer.

== Biography ==
Fernández Vázquez was born in Madrid. She holds a degree in journalism from the Complutense University of Madrid. Her career began in 1998 in Telemadrid, as a substitute presenter of the Madrid Directo program and as a reporter in the sports section, she also worked for TVE, in the area of Culture. She came to television from the press, from the now defunct Diario 16.

She joined CNN+ in January 1999 when broadcasting had not yet begun.

She joined Cuatro in 2005 with its start-up, directly from CNN+ (when both channels were owned by Prisa), being one of the faces of the midday news alongside Marta Reyero. In October 2006, she left the news and joined the program Las Mañanas de Cuatro, presented by Concha García Campoy, as a reporter and collaborator.

In November 2007, she moved to Telecinco to join Hilario Pino (a journalist with whom she worked at CNN+) on the midday news.

In 2009, she presented specials on the Confederations Cup on the Telecinco channel, but in the last four-month period - September–December of the same year she co-presented, together with José Ribagorda, the 21:00 news program.

She presented El programa del verano in 2010, replacing Ana Rosa Quintana during her summer vacation.

On September 13, 2010, she began co-presenting daily, along with David Cantero and Sara Carbonero in sports, Informativos Telecinco in its midday edition until December of that same year.

On December 31, 2010, she presented the New Year's Eve "Campanadas" on Telecinco, along with Pilar Rubio and Sara Carbonero.

On January 10, 2011, following the merge of Gestevisión Telecinco and Sogecable, she returned to Las mañanas de Cuatro as host, replacing Concha García Campoy.

Since October 1, 2012, she combined her morning program with a similar afternoon show called Las tardes de Cuatro, which was on the air for only two months while the afternoon program Te vas a enterar was being pre-produced. In 2012 she was also awarded an Antena de Oro Award.

April 26, 2013 was her last program at the helm of Las mañanas de Cuatro, since May 2013 she went on to present the first edition of Noticias Cuatro alongside Hilario Pino.

From October 7, 2013, until December 30, 2016, she presented Noticias Cuatro on her own. She was part of the Mediaset team until February 21, 2017.

In April 2017 her incorporation to the newspaper El País was made public. She specializes in political and cultural reports and interviews. She participates in special audiovisual coverage and acts as moderator in the forums organized to celebrate the 40th anniversary of the newspaper and other public events such as the Ortega y Gasset Awards. In the summer of 2016, a year before joining El País, she had already collaborated as a writer with the series of summer stories Donde todo puede pasar.

She has worked in other written media, such as the cultural magazine Jot Down where she has published articles on film, literature, opera and music. She has also written in the special editions of Jot Down books. From 2015 to 2018 she collaborated with a monthly column in the paper edition of GQ and weekly with its website. Her articles have appeared in publications such as Esquire, Vogue, Robb Report or Altaïr.

Since leaving Telecinco she has returned to television sporadically as a collaborator. We have seen her in #0 of Movistar+ in programs such as Likes, Ilustres ignorantes or Cero en Historia. She was also part of the team of regular collaborators of the now defunct program A partir de hoy on TVE.

Linked to the world of radio, she has been collaborating with Carles Francino on Cadena SER's La ventana since 2013. Since December 2021, she has been directing and presenting the podcast Nota al pie de la revista Vanity Fair, a space about books with interviews with authors and famous readers that is recorded at Librería Amapolas in October in Madrid.

She has published a novel Te regalaré el mundo (2014) with Espasa-Calpe, set in the present day and in eighteenth-century Madrid, was published. and a book on cinema and literature, No te enamores de cobardes (2021) with Círculo de Tiza.

== Television career ==
- Madrid Directo (1998) (Substitute presenter and reporter of the sports section), Telemadrid.
- Telediario (Culture section reporter), Televisión Española.
- Informativos (2000-2005) (Presenter), CNN+.
- Noticias Cuatro 1 (2005-2006; 2013–2016) (Presenter), Cuatro.
- Las mañanas de Cuatro (2006-2007) (Reporter and collaborator), Cuatro.
- Informativos Telecinco (2007-2010) (Presenter), Telecinco.
- El programa del verano (2010) (Substitute presenter), Telecinco.
- Campanadas 2010-2011 (Presenter along with Sara Carbonero and Pilar Rubio), Telecinco.
- Las mañanas de Cuatro (2011-2013) (Presenter), Cuatro.
- Las tardes de Cuatro (2012) (Presenter), Cuatro.
- Likes (2017-2018) (collaborator), #0.
- A partir de hoy (2020) (collaborator), Televisión Española.

=== Acting ===
- Génesis, en la mente del asesino (2007), special appearance as news anchor.
- La que se avecina (2008), as a news anchor.
- Rabia (2015), as a news anchor.

== Publications ==
- Te regalaré el mundo (Espasa-Calpe, 2014)
- No te enamores de cobardes (Círculo de tiza, 2021)
