= Jesús Cintora =

Spanish journalist and TV presenter

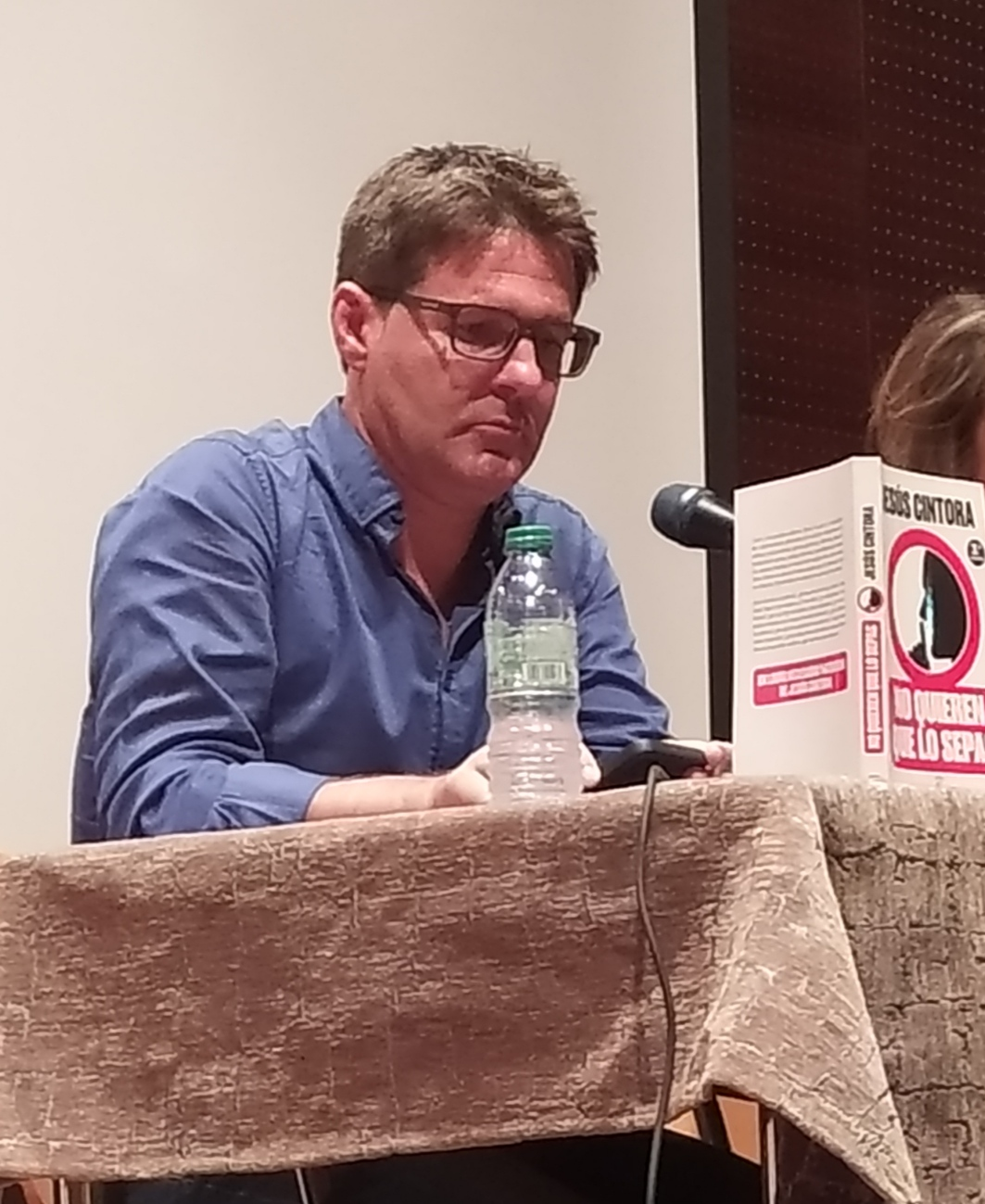
- Cintora in 2022
- Born: Jesús Ángel Cintora Pérez; 27 January 1977; Ágreda, Castile and León, Spain
- Education: Universidad de Navarra
- Occupations: Journalist; author
- Writing career
- Language: Spanish
- Years active: 1996–present
- Website: twitter.com/jesuscintora

Jesús Ángel Cintora Pérez (born 27 January 1977) is a Spanish journalist and television presenter from Ágreda, Castile and León.

== Training and career ==
Cintora studied Journalism, in the field of Audiovisual Communication. He received his BA degree from University of Navarra in 1999. He has been associate professor at the Universidad Carlos III de Madrid. His first works were developed on the radio station Cadena SER of Soria, Pamplona and Zaragoza. He also worked for TVE Navarra, El Mundo, Marca, and Canal+ (Spanish satellite broadcasting company). Between 2002 and 2006 he was the coordinator of Hoy por hoy.

== Radio ==
From 1996 to 2000, his first works in this area were developed on the radio station Cadena SER of Soria, Pamplona, Zaragoza and Madrid.

In 2000 he was a member of the team that started digital broadcasts in Radio Marca.

In 2000 he returned to Cadena SER Madrid. Between 2002 and 2006 he was the coordinator of the program Hoy por hoy, directed first by Iñaki Gabilondo and then Carles Francino since 2005.

He then joined Hora 14 and Hora 25, fin de semana until March 2011, when he began to present the morning program of Cadena SER.

On 11 November, the same year he was fired in a new restructuring of information services of this radio network. Days later, Cintora himself confirmed it by Twitter.

== Television ==
His first works were for Televisión Española of Navarra, Navarra-Canal 4, and Canal Satélite Digital.

Between 2011 and 2013 Cintora participated as a political analyst on several television shows in Spain, such as El debate de la 1 on TVE (Televisión Española) (2012-2013), La noche del Canal 24 horas on TVE (2012-2013), El programa de Ana Rosa (2011-2013), El gran debate (2012-2013) on Telecinco, De hoy a mañana (2012-2013) and El cascabel (2013) on 13TV, Alto y claro in Telemadrid and La vuelta al mundo (2009-2011) on Veo7, and Una mirada al mundo (2012) on Discovery MAX.

Since 6 May 2013, Cintora replaced Marta Fernández presenting the morning TV program Las mañanas de Cuatro in Cuatro.

The first edition of the program hosted by Cintora, in 2013 was attended by Pedro Sánchez Pérez-Castejón, Pablo Iglesias Turrión, Albert Rivera, Alberto Garzón and Pablo Casado Blanco, all of them before reaching a decisive role in the so-called new politics in Spain.

Between 24 November and 8 December 2013, he hosted the new informative called The Wall (in English).

On 19 June 2014, he was part of the Mediaset Spain coverage on the occasion of the proclamation of the King Felipe VI of Spain, along with journalists Ana Rosa Quintana and Pedro Piqueras.

On 27 March 2015 Mediaset Spain announced his resignation as presenter of Las mañanas de Cuatro. An official statement claimed 'Mediaset has the clear objective to inform, not form, audience through a pluralism which give voice to absolutely all political opinions and with presenters who treat information objectively'. Cintora however continued on other projects with Mediaset. Numerous sources reported that Mediaset had received political pressure from the government of the Partido Popular to dismiss Cintora for his usual criticism of the government, something which Cintora himself defended.

In November 2015 Las mañanas de Cuatro received the important Premio Ondas [Ondas Award] 'for opening a stable time band in television today, for the evolution that its successive directors and conductors have contributed and the politrld of evictions and vulture funds and also cutbacks in Health and Education.

In 2016 he leads Cintora al pie de calle.

== Press ==
He got his break in the media with Diario de Soria and El Mundo. Between 2011 and 2012 he worked for with the Spanish edition of Rolling Stone. Between 2011 and 2013 he collaborated with Interviú.

Since 2015 he has written a weekly opinion piece on eldiario.es, an online newspaper edited by Ignacio Escolar.

== Books ==
On 14 April 2015, Jesús Cintora published in Editorial Espasa-Calpe La hora de la verdad [The Moment of Truth]. It is the first time that leaders of the new generation in politics, like Pedro Sánchez Pérez-Castejón, Pablo Iglesias Turrión, Albert Rivera, Alberto Garzón or Pablo Casado Blanco were interviewed for a book. Some of the characters that the journalist signed for television, such as Miguel Ángel Revilla, Sor Lucía Caram and Pedro J. Ramírez also participated. The foreword is by Iñaki Gabilondo, who describes the author in this way: 'Jesús Cintora, a young journalist of Soria whom I met on Cadena SER. His personality and flair were obvious. His informality, his brazenness and expressive simplicity fits like a glove with the newly released demands of transparency, freshness and audacity'.
