= Mamen Mendizábal =

Spanish journalist and television presenter (born 1976)

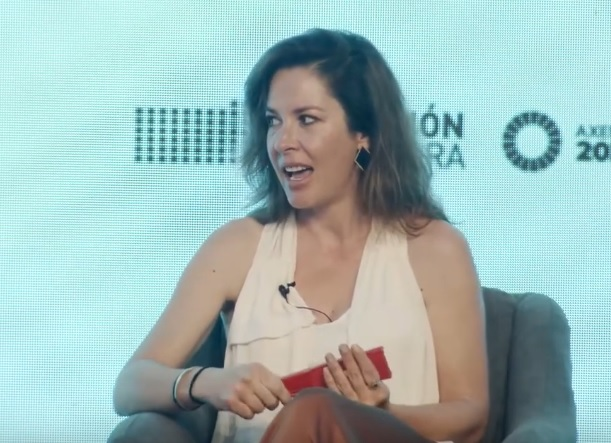
- Born: María del Carmen Mendizábal García; 15 January 1976 (age 49); Madrid, Spain
- Occupations: Journalist; Television presenter
- Years active: 2004–present

María del Carmen Mendizábal García (born 15 January 1976) is a Spanish journalist and television presenter who has worked for the television channel LaSexta since 2006. She began her career at the national radio station Cadena SER as a journalist and presenter before moving into public television with Televisión Española in October 2004. Mendizábal joined the private television channel LaSexta in 2006 and has read the news and presented various programmes on the channel. She has won an ATV Award for Best Communicator of News Programmes, an Antena de Oro and the TP de Oro Award for Best News Presenter twice in 2006 and 2008, respectively.

== Biography ==
On 15 January 1976, Mendizábal was born in Madrid. She was inspired to become a journalist by the likes of Oriana Fallaci, Rosa María Mateo, Rosa Montero and Maruja Torres. Mendizábal graduated from the Complutense University of Madrid with a journalism degree.

Following the completion of her studies, she began her professional career employed for the national radio station Cadena SER as a journalist on the morning radio programme Hoy por hoy presented by Iñaki Gabilondo, for seven years. Mendizábal then presented the early morning weekend programme Punto de fuga but stopped hosting the show by 2005, and also hosted the evening magazine show La Ventana when regular presenter Gemma Nierga was on maternity leave from mid-2005 until January 2006.

The public state television broadcaster Televisión Española employed Mendizábal to be a presenter of the TVE1 political debate programme 59 segundos in October 2004. The programme enabled her to become a mediator of both debate and political news. In early 2006, Mendizábal left public television and joined the private sector when she was signed as a newscaster by the newly formed private LaSexta channel. She was assigned to read the news on the second edition of the La Sexta Noticias news bulletin, and has covered for colleagues who became pregnant. Mendizábal co-hosted the two-hour avant-garde journalism magazine programme Sexto Sentido with Helena Resano and Cristina Villanueva for one season commencing in November 2006. She presented the 2008 LaSexta fictional documentary series Viva la República in which a theorised Republican faction victory in the Spanish Civil War and its effects on Spain are discussed. Mendizábal moderated a programme on LaSexta following a debate between prime ministerial candidates José Luis Rodríguez Zapatero and Mariano Rajoy prior to the 2008 Spanish general election. She worked as a special envoy reporting on the 2008 United States presidential election, which was won by Barack Obama.

In November 2008, Mendizábal was elected to serve as a vice-president of the Federation of Associations of Journalists of Spain, which was a role she held until October 2009. She was replaced by Elsa González due to time constraints forcing her to skip other commitments. Mendizábal began working as the main presenter of the evening news magazine programme Más vale tarde on 29 October 2012. In May 2017, she was part of a sit-in at LaSexta to promote a social media backed campaign promoting awareness of the European migrant crisis in the Mediterranean. Mendizábal presented the investigative journalism series Scoop in 2018, interviewing figures who were responsible for compling the investigations. She had proposed the concept of the programme, with she and the La Caña Brothers agency sent to LaSexta, who accepted it.

Mendizábal was signed to present the Palo y astilla programme in 2019 in which she interviews notable Spanish figures about their life and background to how they were able to achieve success. The programme was first broadcast on LaSexa in February 2021 after being delayed from its late-2020 start. She, César Carballo, José María Gay de Liébana, Yayo Herrero and Ainara Zubillaga co-authored the book Adelante: Solo existe el futuro. Y es nuestro in 2020. In May, Mendizábal decided to stop presenting Más vale tarde because she wanted a change in her life and she wanted to do other projects. She also cited the COVID-19 pandemic helping her to "see where I was and realize that life is one, that we forget." Mendizábal made her final on-screen appearance on the programme on 30 June 2021, and was replaced by Iñaki López and Cristina Pardo.

== Personal life ==
She is in a relationship with the radio broadcaster José Antonio Ponseti and the two have been living together since 2013. Mendizábal has no children.

== Awards ==
In 2005, she was voted the recipient of the ATV Award for Best Communicator of News Programmes and the TP de Oro Award for Best News Presenter in both 2006 and 2008. The Federation of Radio and Television Associations awarded Mendizábal an Antena de Oro accolade in the television section for her work on Más Vale Tarde in 2013. She received the Premios Ondas Award for Best Television Presenter in 2014.

A jury from the Association of European Journalists along with the European Commission and the European Parliament representations in Spain voted to award Mendizábal the Salvador de Madariaga Television Award for "exercising responsible journalism and committed to the reality of community institutions" and "her commitment to current news, his pulse to handle hot information." The Spanish Association of Women in the Media named her the winner of its media category at the IX Edition of the 'Press-Woman' Awards for her "ability to apply effectively, as director and host, in a generalist and daily program, 'Más vale tarde', the focus of gender in a transversal and repeated way and by applying parity in the participation of analysts in gatherings and debates."
