= Pepa Bueno =

Spanish journalist

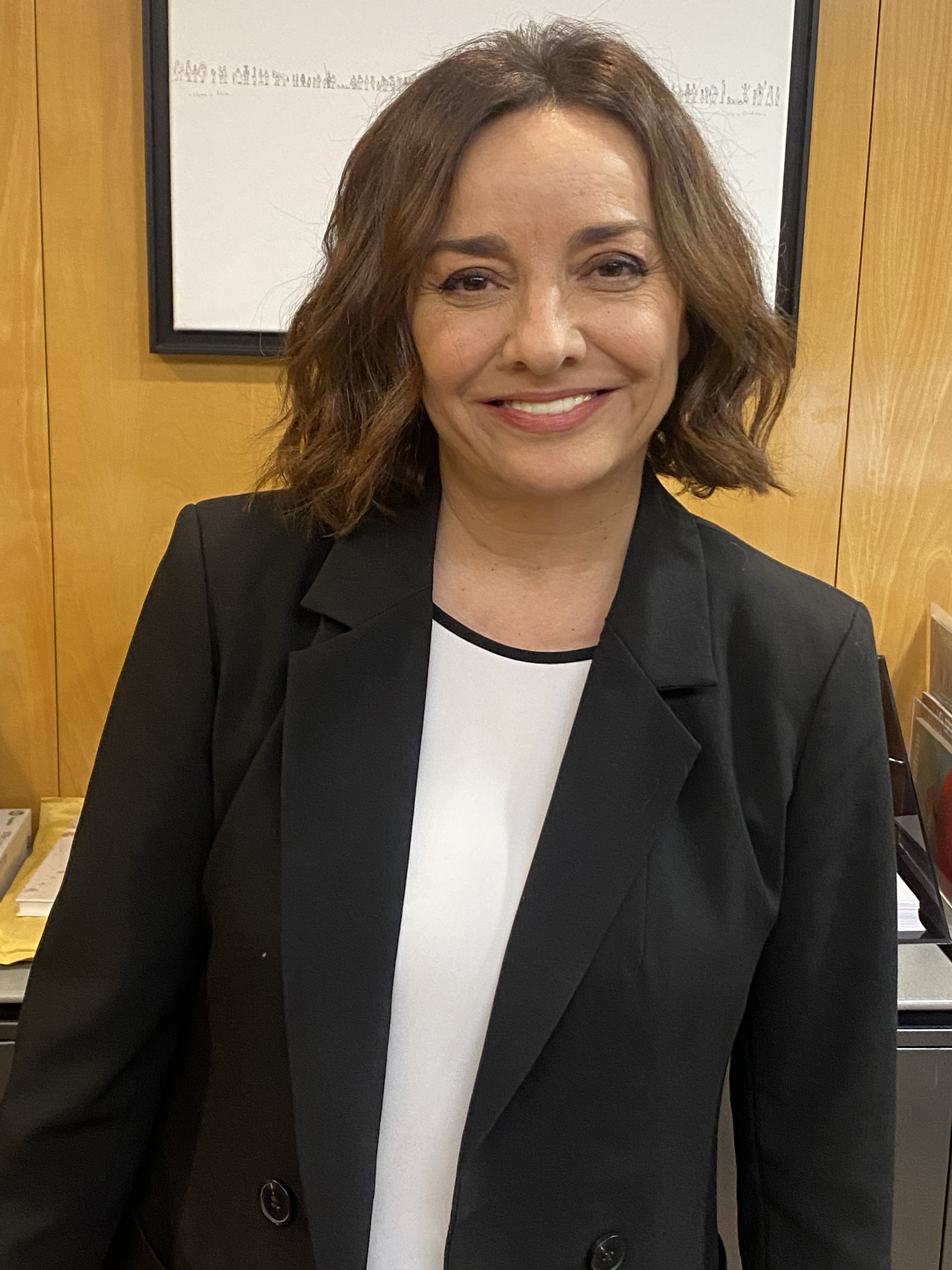
- Born: 1964 (age 61–62); Badajoz, Spain
- Occupation: Journalist
- Years active: 1991–present
- Notable work: Journalist or host of: Los Desayunos de TVE; Telediario; Hoy por hoy; Hora 25

María José "Pepa" Bueno Márquez (born 1964) is a Spanish journalist. She was host of the well-known radio show Hoy por hoy on Cadena SER. In 2021, she was appointed as editor-in-chief of El País.

Born in Badajoz, Bueno started her career as news director of the local station of Radio Nacional de España (RNE) in Extremadura, and later was transferred to Aragón. She was also editor of Diario 16.

In 1991 Bueno joined Televisión Española to anchor the regional news bulletin in the Territorial Center in Andalucia. Soon she was promoted to the Madrid Territorial Center.

In September 1996, she began directing and anchoring the current affairs show Gente with Jose Toledo. She stayed there for eight years.

In 2004, soon after Fran Llorente was hired as news director of Televisión Española, Bueno was selected to replace Luis Mariñas on the breakfast interview program Los Desayunos de TVE, a position she held until 2009. In 2007 she began anchoring the news magazine Informe Semanal and the morning magazine Esta mañana.

In September 2009, Bueno was hired as anchor of the nightly edition of TVE's flagship newscast Telediario after Lorenzo Milá was named as correspondent in Washington, D.C.

In 2012 Bueno left TVE soon after was hired by Cadena SER to host with Gemma Nierga the most listened-to radio show in Spain, Hoy por hoy.

In September 2019, she was named host of Hora 25 on Cadena SER.

In July 2021, Bueno was appointed as the new editor-in-chief of El País. In June 2025 she was replaced by Jan Martínez Ahrens.
