= J. J. Santos =

Spanish sports journalist and host

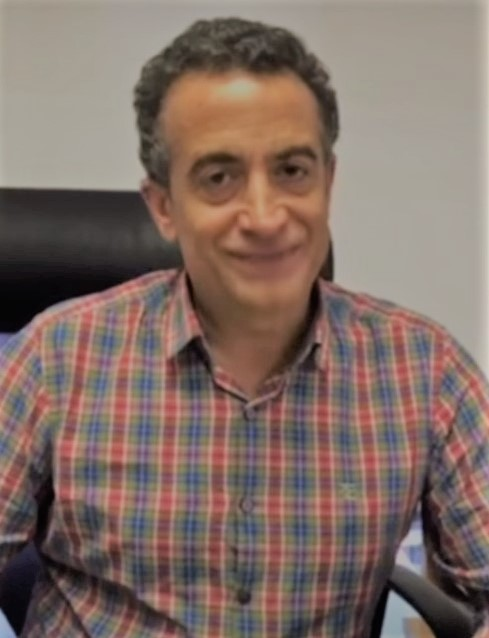
- Born: José Javier Santos Rubio; July 29, 1960 (age 66); Madrid, Spain
- Occupations: Journalist and sports anchor

José Javier Santos Rubio (born 29 July 1960 in Quintanilla de Tres Barrios, Madrid), better known as J. J. Santos is a Spanish sports journalist and host. Since 2006 he has been sub-director of the sports area of Informativos Telecinco. He is also narrator and commentator on football matches that are broadcast in Telecinco.

== Biography ==
His broadcast career began in 1978 when he was hired by Radio España as host of the sports show El Deportivo. In 1991 Santos was hired by Onda Cero to host El Penalti. Then in 1987 he received the Antena de Oro award as best anchor.

In 1994 he became news director of the radio station, the director at that time Luis Mariñas decided to incorporate him in the sports section of the newscast that was anchored by José Ribagorda.

In 1997 Televisión Española hired both Ribagorda and Santos, Santos then anchored the daily sports section in Telediario. Then in 2000 he became reporter in Diario AS.

In 2002 he was hired by Antena 3 again as sports anchor in Antena 3 Noticias, also between 2004 and 2006 he hosted Al primer toque in Onda Cero.

Finally in 2006 Pedro Piqueras hired him as sports director of Telecinco.
