= Helena Resano =

Spanish journalist (born 1974)

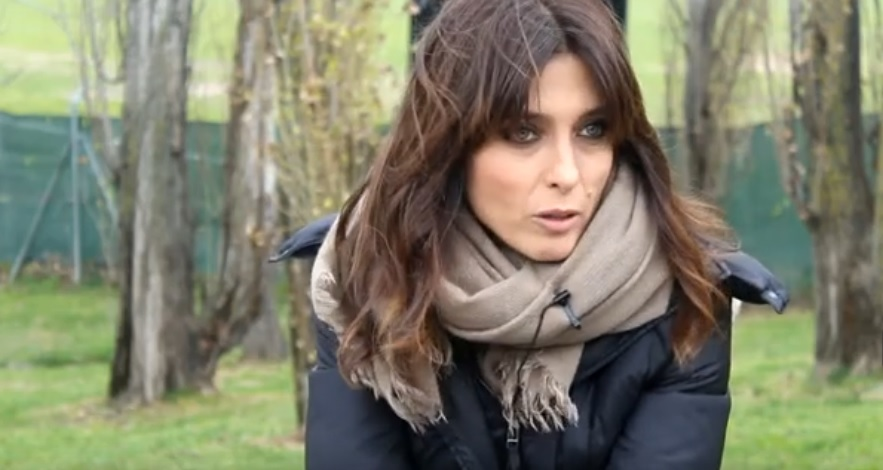
- Helena Resano's Image
- Born: María Helena Resano Lizaldre; 9 February 1974 (age 52); Pamplona, Navarre, Spain
- Occupation: Journalist
- Years active: 1994–present
- Spouse: Aitor Aristegui
- Children: 2

María Helena Resano Lizaldre (born 9 February 1974) is a Spanish journalist who works for LaSexta. Her professional journalistic career began as an editor for the radio broadcaster Cadena SER. Resano presented a weekly programme on Pamplona Televisión before joining Radio Nacional de España in Madrid on a scholarship in 1995 and then at Telecinco between 1996 and 1999. She worked at Televisión Española from 1999 to 2006, first for 24 Horas as an editor and reporter, news bulletins on TVE1 and presenting the current affairs programme 59 Segundos. Resano has worked for LaSexa since 2006, presenting the afternoon La Sexta Noticias news bulletin as well as fronting other current affair programmes for the broadcaster.

== Biography ==
On 9 February 1974, Resano was born in Pamplona, Navarre. Her father was an electricity company worker. Resano had wanted to become a professional solo pianist but she was advised to stop doing it when studying the Conservatorio professional de música Pablo Sarasate, because she had to undergo wrist surgery at age 16. She graduated from the University of Navarra with a degree in Audiovisual Journalism in 1996, after beginning her course four years earlier because she thought it the best institute for her studies in the course.

Resano began her professional journalism career in her hometown of Pamplona in 1994, editing the Iñaki Gabilondo programme Hoy por hoy broadcast by the radio broadcaster Cadena SER. She subsequently presented a weekly variety programme on Pamplona Televisión and relocated to Madrid in 1995, joining Radio Nacional de España on a scholarship. The following year, Resano made the switch to join the newsroom of the national television station Telecinco, remaining there until 1999. She covered events such as Hurricane Mitch causing widespread flooding in Honduras and Nicaragua. In October 1999, she left Telecinco to join the rolling news channel 24 Horas run by the state broadcaster Televisión Española (RTVE) as an editor and newscaster. Resano began variously presenting the morning, last, weekend and the 9:00 p.m news bulletins on TVE1. She was also a editor for Telediario 2. Notable events Resano reported on include the death Pope John Paul II, the Ibero-American Summits and the 2004 wedding of her colleague Letizia Ortiz to the future Felipe VI (then known as Prince Felipe de Borbón). She presented the current affairs programme 59 Segundos broadcast on TVE1 from October 2004.

In February 2006, she accepted an offer to leave RTVE and was employed to join the fledgling private television channel LaSexta. Resano began presenting the late night weekly current affairs documentary-debate programme La Actualidad en 2D from 2 April 2006. and the two-hour avant-garde journalistic magazine programme Sexto Sentido alongside Mamen Mendizábal and Cristina Villanueva for a single season starting in November 2006. She covered the 2006 FIFA World Cup in Germany, and has presented the La Sexta Noticias 2:00 pm bulletin since September 2006, reporting on various elections in Spain and abroad.

Outside of broadcasting, Resano is a professor who teaches news editing to postgraduate students at the Universidad CEU San Pablo and provides training courses to spokespeople from the corporate and political world, institutions and classes on public speaking and how to do television interviews. Between November 2015 and October 2017, she served as a member of the Madrid Press Association's board of directors. In 2016, Resano's book, La trastienda de un informativo, was published. She is the author of an monthly article in the magazine is a frequent participant in the press gatherings of the Sunday magazine Yo Dona, which is published by El Mundo.

== Personal life ==
She is married to the Rugby Challenge Donostia founder Aitor Aristegui. They have two children.

== Awards ==
In 2000, she won the Premio Manos Unidas "for the best audiovisual work for the report La tierra de todos broadcast on Canal 24 Horas." Resano received an Micrófonos de Plata de los Informadores award in 2007. She has been voted a double winner in the Antena de Oro television award category for her work on La Sexta Noticias by the Federation of Radio and Television Associations of Spain in both 2009 and 2017. Resano was twice nominated for the Best News Anchor accolade which is presented as part of the Iris Awards in each of 2017 and 2019.
