= Informativos Telecinco =

- Also known as: Entre hoy y mañana (1990–93); Las noticias (1993–97)
- Genre: News
- Developed by: Agencia Atlas
- Directed by: Carlos Franganillo
- Presented by: Leticia Iglesias; Roberto Fernández; David Cantero; Isabel Jiménez; Carlos Franganillo; José Ribagorda; Carme Chaparro
- Opening theme: World Events by Matthew Cang (1993–97)
- Country of origin: Spain
- Original language: Spanish

Production
- Camera setup: Multi-camera
- Running time: 45 minutes 150 Minutes (Morning edition)

Original release
- Network: Telecinco
- Release: 3 May 1990 – present

Informativos Telecinco is the news division of the Spanish television broadcaster Telecinco. The newscasts, along with Noticias Cuatro, are produced by Agencia Atlas, a news agency created by Telecinco in 1998.

== History ==
=== 1990–1993 ===
When Telecinco began as a private television network in 1990, it decided to enhance its character as entertainment and fun television at the expense of its informative aspect. About two months after the debut the network decided to begin its newscasts.

Valerio Lazarov, then the director of the network, hired Luis Mariñas (then one of the presenters of TVE's Telediario) as news director and, on 3 May 1990, started a 15-minutes late-night newscast titled Entre hoy y mañana ("between today and tomorrow").

On 8 September 1990, the newscast started broadcasting on weekends and in the following two years the sole newscast of the network began surpassing in ratings the iconic Telediario (then presented by Matías Prats) and Antena 3 Noticias (then presented by José María Carrascal).

On 6 July 1992, Telecinco premiered its midday newscast titled Hoy ("Today") presented by Mariñas, while Julio Fernández began presenting Entre hoy y mañana and Felipe Mellizo debuted on the weekend newscast.

=== 1993–1998 ===
In April 1993, there was a major revamp of Telecinco news services. To extend the length, all newscasts were retitled as Las Noticias ("The News").

Miguel Ángel Aguilar replaced Felipe Mellizo on weekends, later Luis Mariñas moved to the evening newscast while Carmen Tomás began anchoring on middays.

During the 1994–95 season, Luis Mariñas stayed in the evening newscast, Tomás on middays while Fernando Ónega debuted on the late-night newscast. José Ribagorda and María José Sáez presented at weekends.

During the following season, Tomás resigned, Ónega moved to middays, Mariñas again moved to evenings while Ribagorda and J. J. Santos began presenting the overnight bulletins.

In the 1996–97 season, Tomás and Andrés Aberasturi moved to weekends. Iñaki Gabilondo, the former head of news services on TVE, began a daily interview section on the evening edition. In January 1997, Telecinco started another major revamp. Miguel Ángel Aguilar left the network, being replaced by Carlos Carnicero. Ónega moved to Antena 3 and both Ribagorda and Santos moved to TVE. Juan Ramón Lucas and Montserrat Domínguez debuted on the 14:30 edition, Mariñas stayed on the 20:30 edition and Juan Pedro Valentín moved to the overnight edition in March 1997. Weekend newscasts were presented by Ángels Barceló.

In September 1997, coinciding with the makeover of the network, the generic title Informativos Telecinco was adopted, but Las Noticias and Entre hoy y mañana maintained their titles. Mariñas left the network shortly after, being replaced by Juan Ramón Lucas. Valentín stayed on the overnights while Montserrat Domínguez moved to weekends. Later Domínguez moved to overnights and Fermín Bocos debuted on weekends. During this season Telecinco premiered the morning newsmagazine La mirada crítica, hosted by Vicente Vallés, and the morning newscast presented by Gloria Serra and Juan Antonio Villanueva

=== 1998–2001 ===
Informativos Telecinco took away the individual names of each edition. In September 1998, the midday, evening and weekend newscasts appeared with a new set, while the overnight and morning editions came from a set in the Telecinco's newsroom. During this season all presenters remained in their respective posts. In February 1999, Vicente Vallés and Ángeles Blanco replaced Fermín Bocos on weekends. In September 2000, Juan Pedro Valentín was hired as head of the news services of Telecinco. In February 2001, Montserrat Domínguez debuted as host of La mirada crítica. In July 2001, Lucas left the network and moved to Antena 3.

=== 2001–2006 ===
Telecinco opted to have an individual presenter on all editions and a co-presenter to explain the news that was presented. Hilario Pino, coming from CNN+, debuted on the midday edition along with Carme Chaparro. Barceló and Agustín Hernández debuted on the evening edition. Weekend editions were presented by Ángeles Blanco and Fernando Olmeda. Màxim Huerta took over the midnight edition while Rafa Fernández and Ana Rodríguez presented in the mornings.

In September 2004, Begoña Chamorro replaced Chaparro, the latter replaced Blanco on weekends. José Luis Fuentecilla joined the morning newscast along with Màxim Huerta.

One year later, Barceló and Montserrat Domínguez both left Telecinco. Juan Pedro Valentín temporarily replaced Barceló with Alejandra Herranz and Blanco. Álvaro Rivas and Lucía Rodil took over the mornings. Ana Rodríguez worked on overnights and Vicente Vallés returned to La mirada crítica.

Poor ratings performances of the evening edition caused the network to cut it 25 minutes and moved it to 21:00, putting it in direct competition with its rival networks. Valentín remained as sole presenter of this edition but the poor ratings continued. In January 2006, Valentín was fired and Pedro Piqueras was hired as new head of the news services.

=== 2006–2024 ===
With Piqueras (coming from RNE) as new director of news services, Telecinco began climbing in the ratings. Hilario Pino remained as sole presenter on middays and Piqueras took over the evening editions. José Ribagorda returned to the network to present the weekend editions with Carme Chaparro. Agustín Hernández joined Lucía Rodil on the morning newscast.

The long medical leave of Pino was covered temporarily by Begoña Chamorro and then by Ángeles Blanco. In September 2006, Yolanda Benítez replaced Rodil in the mornings. During this season, the weekend midday edition was moved to 15:00 hours and reduced in duration. In September 2007, Blanco began presenting and directing the morning edition with Daniel Gómez. In December 2007, the weekday midday edition was also reduced and moved to 15:00 and Marta Fernández began presenting it.

Again, bad rating performances on the midday edition caused it to be moved again to the 14:30 slot beginning in September 2008. Vicente Vallés left La mirada crítica and was replaced by María Teresa Campos. Yolanda Benítez was her substitute during her medical leave. A major move of presenters occurred in September 2009: Pedro Piqueras moved to the midday newscast, José Ribagorda moved to the evening edition with Marta Fernández and J. J. Santos as sports presenter, Carme Chaparro remained as sole anchor on weekends and a new 8:00 AM newscast presented by Pino began in that season, following the cancellation of La mirada crítica.

A year later, former Telediario presenter David Cantero joined the network, causing another major move of presenters, with Pino in the mornings, David Cantero and Marta Fernández at midday (with Sara Carbonero as sports presenter). Pedro Piqueras returned to the evening edition while Chaparro and Ribagorda remained on weekends.

Following the fusion on Telecinco and Cuatro in January 2011, Pino moved to the noon edition of Noticias Cuatro and Concha García Campoy replaced him. In July 2011, Isabel Jiménez joined Cantero on the midday edition and a month later Leticia Iglesias debuted on the morning edition and in December began as sole presenter after the García Campoy's medical leave. Roberto Fernández and Ane Ibarzabal debuted in the morning editions in June 2013 and, in January 2014, Iglesias joined the latter edition.

=== 2024–present ===
From the middle of 2023, new Mediaset news director Francisco Moreno García had hinted that Informativos Telecinco would receive a makeover in the early part of 2024. In July of that year, Piqueras had announced his retirement from journalism in December, and presented his last edition on 21 December, which received a 10.7% share but lagged behind both Antena 3 and La 1. His replacement in November was confirmed to be Carlos Franganillo, jumping ship from Telediario.

La mirada crítica returned, now presented by Ana Terradillos, in September 2023, and continued to received respectable daytime ratings. Franganillo's debut was accompanied by a new, dark blue set and title sequence, with a lighter version at 3pm. Franganillo's debut was Telecinco's best news performance for 11 months, beating La 1, and Franganillo's 9pm newscast beats his former network in the ratings more often than not. In February, as revealed by Mediaset in October 2023, Noticias Cuatro returned after a five-year break, but was trounced by LaSexta in the ratings on its first night.

As part of the shake-up, David Cantero and Leticia Iglesias moved to join José Ribagorda at weekends, replacing Ángeles Blanco, who swapped to the 3pm broadcast.

== Presenters ==
=== Current ===
- Informativos Telecinco El Matinal (06:30)
  - Anchors: Laila Jiménez and Arancha Morales
  - Sports: Lidia Camón
- Informativos Telecinco Mediodía (15:00)
  - Anchors: Ángeles Blanco and Isabel Jiménez
  - Sports: Ramón Fuentes
- Informativos Telecinco Noche (21:05)
  - Anchors: Carlos Franganillo
  - Sports: J. J. Santos
- Informativos Telecinco Fin de Semana (15:00 and 21:05)
  - Anchors: David Cantero, José Ribagorda and Leticia Iglesias
  - Sports: Jesús María Pascual

=== Past ===
- Luis Mariñas (1990-1997)
- Felipe Mellizo (1992)
- Julio Fernández (1990-1993)
- Miguel Ángel Aguilar (1992-1993)
- Carmen Tomás (1993-1996)
- José Ribagorda (1994-1997, 2006-2024)
- Fernando Ónega (1994-1997)
- Andrés Aberasturi (1996)
- Carlos Carnicero (1997)
- Juan Ramón Lucas (1997-2001)
- Juan Pedro Valentín (1997-2000, 2005-2006)
- Àngels Barceló (1997-2005)
- Fermín Bocos (1997-1999)
- Juan Antonio Villanueva (1997-1999)
- Sol Villanueva (1997-2006)
- Montserrat Domínguez (1998-2004)
- Gloria Serra (1998-2001)
- Marieta Frías (1998-2003)
- Rafa Fernández (1998-2006)
- Paloma Ferre (2000)
- Ángeles Blanco (2000- )
- Vicente Vallés (1998-2008)
- Hilario Pino (2001-2010)
- Fernando Olmeda (2001-2006)
- Agustín Hernández
- Carme Chaparro (2001-2016)
- Màxim Huerta (2002-2005)
- Ana Rodríguez (2001-2006)
- José Luis Fuentecilla (2004-2005)
- Lucía Rodil (2003-2006)
- Begoña Chamorro (2004-2006)
- Álvaro Rivas (2004-2006)
- Alejandra Herranz (2005)
- María José Sáez (1993-1996)
- Daniel Gómez (2007)
- Yolanda Benítez (2007-2010)
- Marta Fernández (2007-2011)
- Maria Teresa Campos (2008-2009) (La Mirada Critica)
- Pedro Piqueras (2006-2023)
