= Isabel San Sebastián =

Spanish journalist and writer (born 1959)

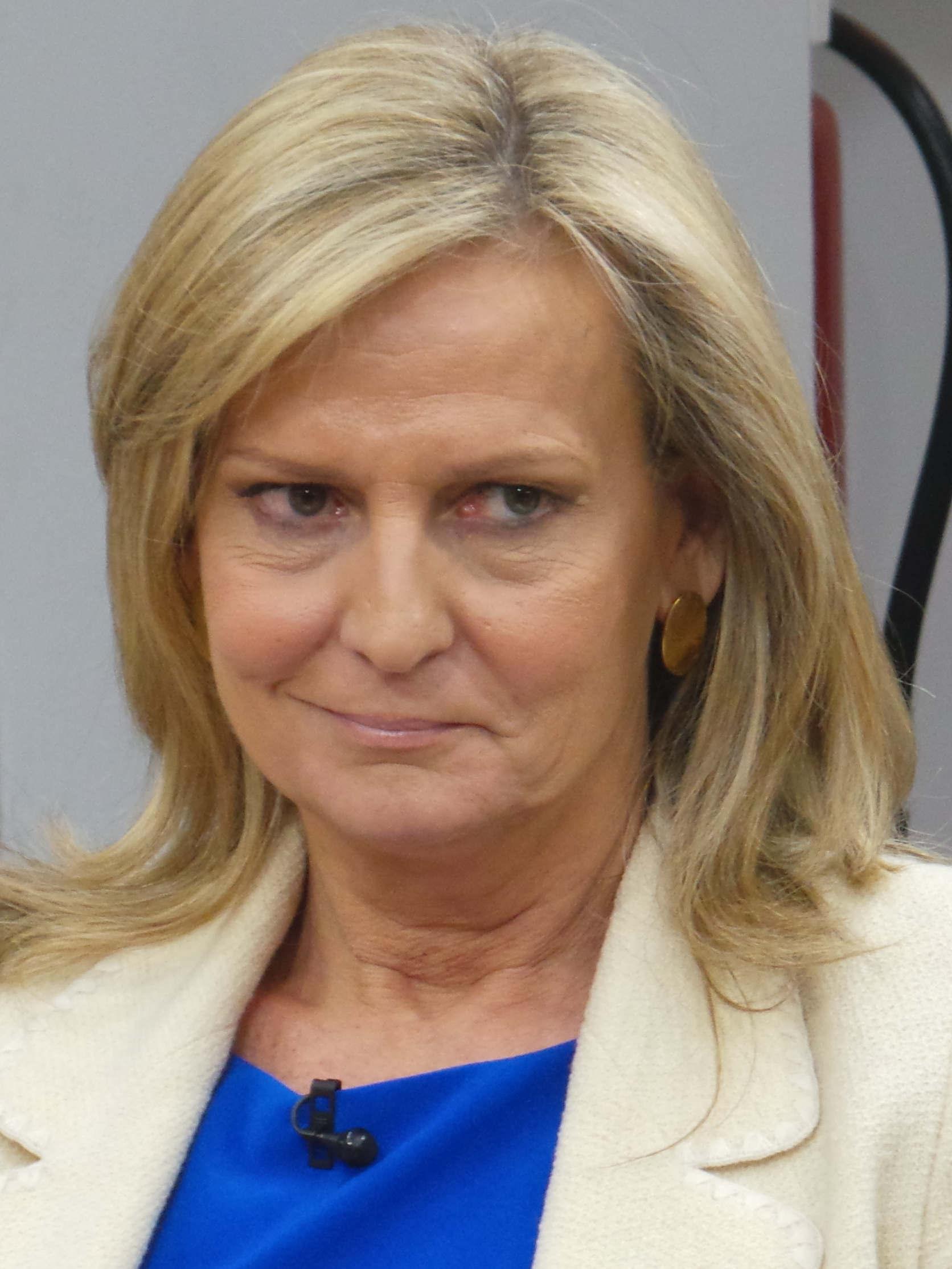
- 2015
- Born: Isabel San Sebastián Cabasés; 15 March 1959 (age 67); Santiago, Chile
- Education: Complutense University of Madrid
- Occupations: Journalist, presenter, writer

Isabel San Sebastián Cabasés (born 15 March 1959) is a Spanish journalist and writer.

== Biography ==
=== Early years ===
The daughter of a Spanish diplomat, Isabel San Sebastián was born in Santiago, Chile. Her ancestry is Basque and Navarrese, and she is the cousin of Pamplona politician Iñaki Cabasés. After graduating in Information Sciences from the Complutense University of Madrid, she joined the newspaper La Gaceta del Norte in Bilbao. From there she jumped to writing for national media such as the magazine Época and the newspaper ABC, where she began to write the political column "El contrapunto", and where she remained from 1989 to 2000.

Her first contacts with the world of television were due to Jesús Hermida, who brought her into the political tertulia of the programs he presented and hosted on Antena 3: Con Hermida y Cía (1995) and La hora H (1996–1997). In the 1995–1996 season she also worked for Cadena SER, both on Hora 25 and Hoy por hoy.

=== 1997–1998 ===
In 1997, she went into public media at the request of the new RTVE director, Fernando López-Amor. At Radio Nacional de España, she began to appear in September of that year, both on the recently launched morning program Buenos días con Carlos Herrera and the nighttime program 24 Horas.

At Televisión Española (TVE), San Sebastián was offered the opportunity to present the interview show El tercer grado (which premiered with an interview with Ana Botella, wife of then President José María Aznar), besides working on the morning news program Los Desayunos de TVE.

=== 1998–2002 ===
In 1998, coinciding with the arrival of Ernesto Sáenz de Buruaga at the network's news channel, she was hired by Antena 3 to replace Antonio San José at the head of the morning news program El primer café.

At the same time, she started working at Onda Cero, contributing to the programs A toda radio with Marta Robles and Protagonistas with Luis del Olmo.

In 2002 she was dismissed as the head of the program and relieved by Carmen Gurruchaga. The exit was framed in the context of a tough confrontation between Pedro J. Ramírez, director of the newspaper El Mundo and César Alierta, president of Telefónica, majority shareholder of the network at that time. According to the journalist herself, who worked in both media (she had joined the editorial staff of El Mundo in March 2000), she was pressured to leave the newspaper. Faced with her refusal, Antena 3 acted, in her words, "repressing her."

=== 2002–2006 ===
At that moment, Luis Herrero on Cadena COPE and María Teresa Campos on television, both critics of the way in which the journalist was fired, offered her a spot on their respective political tertulias. Isabel San Sebastián was thus brought onto La Mañana on COPE and Día a día on Telecinco.

In the 2004–2005 season she led the political program El Debate on Telemadrid, joining the María Teresa Campos team the following year, this time on Antena 3: first in September 2005, for the season of Cada día, and in 2006 on the short-lived show Lo que inTeresa.

That same season of 2004, when Federico Jiménez Losantos replaced Herrero at the head of La Mañana, Isabel San Sebastián opted to follow Luis del Olmo in his latest radio venture and joined the new edition of Protagonistas on Punto Radio.

=== 2007–present ===
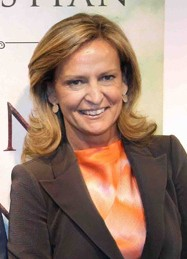
At the presentation of her fourth novel, Un reino lejano, on 15 November 2012

In 2007 she participated in the political tertulias of the TVE program 59 segundos and Telemadrid's Alto y Claro. On the latter, a verbal clash with the journalist José María Calleja led to him leaving the show that January. At the beginning of November of the same year, it was Isabel San Sebastián who left the set of 59 segundos due to the allegations that Calleja had leveled at her, accusing her of "having fattened ETA". Due to this she filed a legal claim for protection of honor. In July 2010, the Court of First Instance ordered Calleja to pay €12,000 to San Sebastián. The ruling was overturned by the Supreme Court in November 2014, which "placed the conflict in the field of freedom of expression and the right to honor, and concluded that this was prevalent in this case inasmuch as the accused journalist limited himself to making a criticism regarding a subject of interest and in a context of previous confrontation."

From 2007 to 2010, San Sebastián also appeared on La Tarde con Cristina for COPE, led by Cristina López Schlichting, and presented the program La noche de on Popular TV.

From September 2008 to June 2009 she took part in the tertulia of the program La mirada crítica, presented by María Teresa Campos.

From 6 September 2010 to 19 December 2012 she hosted the political analysis program Alto y Claro on Telemadrid.

Beginning on 24 October 2011, and on the occasion of the remodeling of ABC Punto Radio, she presented the nightly news program El contrapunto until 15 March 2013. From December 2012 to August 2013 she also participated in El gran debate on Telecinco. From 2013 to 2014 she appeared on Las mañanas de Cuatro.

In recent years she has contributed to the programs El cascabel (2013–present), Más claro agua (2013–present), and La Marimorena (2013–present) on 13TV, Amigas y conocidas (2014–present) on La 1, Más Madrid (2015) on Telemadrid, Un tiempo nuevo (2015) on Telecinco, and various esRadio programs.

== Books ==
- Mayor Oreja, una victoria frente al miedo (2001)
- Los años de plomo, memoria en carne viva de las víctimas (2003)
- El árbol y las nueces, with Carmen Gurruchaga (2000)
- ¿A qué juegan nuestros hijos? (2004), with Javier San Sebastián
- Cuentos de María la gorda (2005)
- La visigoda (novel, 2006)
- Fungairiño: El enemigo de ETA (2007)
- Astur (novel, 2008)
- Imperator (novel, 2010)
- Un reino lejano (novel, 2012)
- La mujer del diplomático (novel, 2014), Editorial Plaza & Janés Editores, ISBN 9788401343544
- Lo último que verán tus ojos (novel, 2016), Editorial Plaza & Janés, ISBN 9788401017421
