= Cristina Villanueva =

Spanish journalist and television presenter

- Born: Cristina Villanueva Ramos; 24 February 1976 (age 50); Tiana, Province of Barcelona, Catalonia, Spain
- Occupation: Journalist
- Years active: 1997–present
- Spouse: Jorge García
- Children: 2

Cristina Villanueva Ramos (born 24 February 1976) is a Spanish news and sports journalist who works for LaSexta. She began her career covering various sports such as swimming, motorcycle racing and basketball for the state broadcaster Televisión Española from 1997 to 2004 before doing general newscasting on La 2 Noticias until 2006. Villanueva began newscasting for LaSexta in 2006 and has presented other programmes on the channel.

== Biography ==
On 24 February 1976, Villanueva was born in Tiana, Province of Barcelona, Catalonia, Spain. She spent her childhood watching television documentaries at home; her mother did sewing at home and her father was self-taught. In 1998, Villanueva graduated from the Autonomous University of Barcelona with a degree in journalism.

She began her broadcasting career working for the state broadcaster Televisión Española (RTVE) on the Teledeporte channel in 1997. Villanueva covered the 1997 FINA Swimming World Cup held in Barcelona, Tennis' Federation Cup as well as the ATP Tour, the 2000 Summer Olympics in Sydney, the 2004 Summer Olympics in Athens, and Basketball's Copa del Rey de Baloncesto. Villanueva was also an on-track reporter and writing editor for the MotoGP World Championship, and also contributed to the Estadio-2 sports programme. She also read the news on the radio station Ràdio Premià de Mar. In 2004, she decided she wanted to do general newscasting, and moved to read the news on La 2 Noticias, replacing Beatriz Ariño.

In 2006, Villaneuva was signed to leave RTVE and joined the new LaSexta television channel, becoming part of its news broadcasting team alongside Helena Resano and Cristina Saavedra. She was part of the team of LaSexta broadcasters that covered the 2006 FIFA World Cup in Germany and the 2006 FIBA World Championship in Japan. Villanueva, Resano and Mamen Mendizábal co-presented the two-hour avant-garde journalistic magazine programme Sexto Sentido that lasted a single season from November 2006 to March 2007. She would conduct reports and interviews with her colleagues on the show. Villanueva co-presented the sports television programme No me digas que no te gusta el fútbol with former basketball player Juan Manuel López Iturriaga for two seasons between April 2007 and May 2008. During mid-2011, she presented the weekday two-hour programme Verano Directo.

In 2013, she began writing the book Desplegando velas, which was published six years later. Villaneuva was inspired to author the book to eliminate the anguish she had been suffering in her life due to impostor syndrome. In April 2019 she published the book "Unfurling Sails" where she reflects on feminism together with other relevant women in different fields.

== Personal life ==
She is married to the journalist Jorge García, with whom she has two children, Villaneuva is a feminist.

== Awards ==
She has been awarded the Larra Prize for Journalism from the Madrid Press Association and both the TP de Oro and the Premios Ondas accolades collectively for her teamwork.
