= Carme Chaparro =

Spanish television presenter

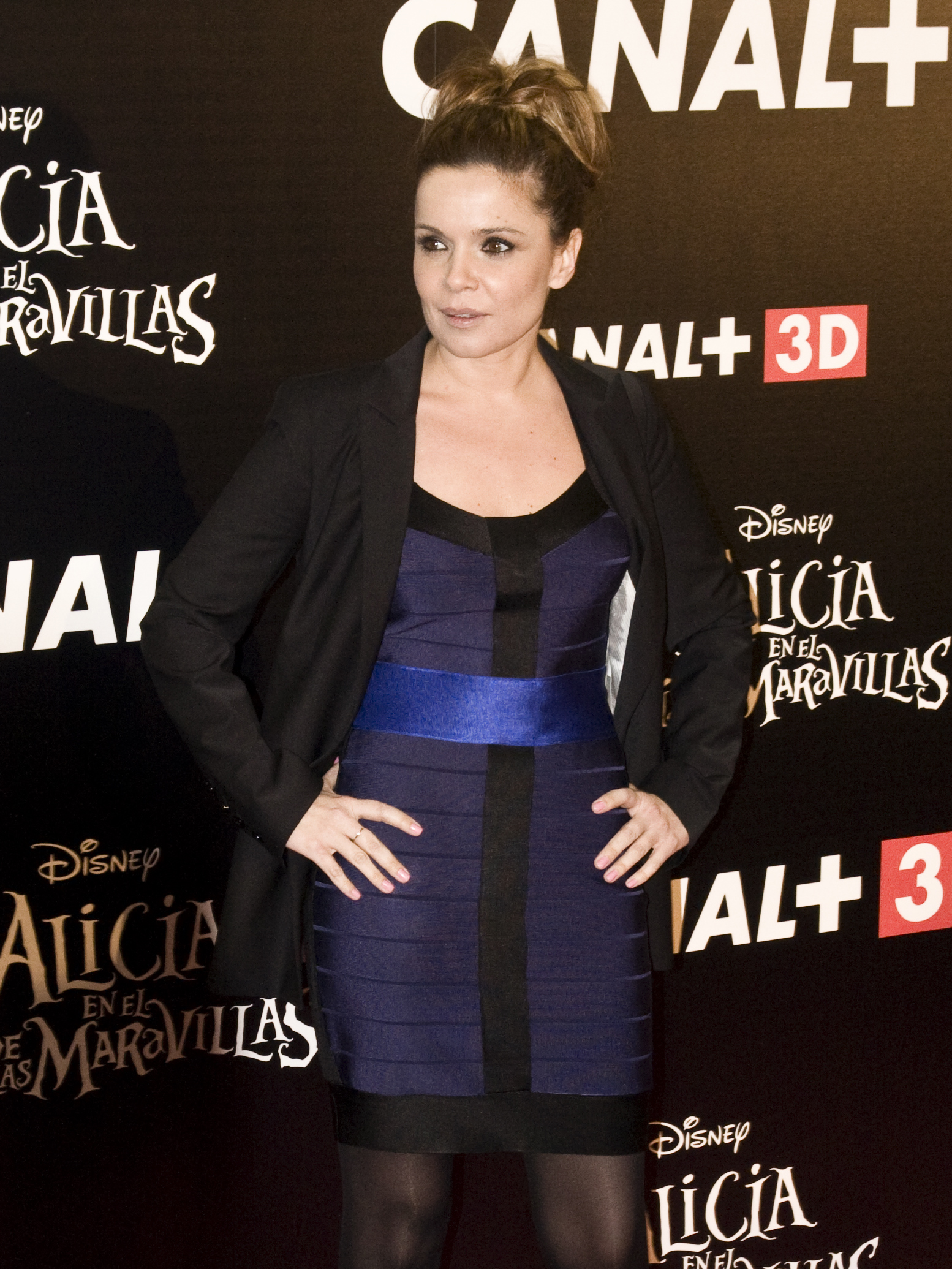
- Born: Carme Chaparro Martínez; 5 February 1973 (age 52); Salamanca, Spain
- Occupation(s): Television presenter and writer
- Employers: Telecinco; (1998–2017; 2021–present); Cuatro; (2017–present)

Carme Chaparro Martínez (born in Salamanca, Spain on February 5, 1973) is a Spanish journalist and writer.

== Career ==
Chaparro holds a degree in journalism from the Autonomous University of Barcelona (1996).

She began her professional career as a writer for the TV3 programs Ciutadans (Ondas award), Generació X and Les coses com són. She wrote reports for the Sunday supplement of La Vanguardia. She was editor of the news services of Cadena SER in Tarragona and later editor-in-chief of the magazine Zona Alta, director and presenter of the program 39 punts de vida on BTV and director and host of the weekend magazine program De nou a nou on Ràdio L'Hospitalet.

In January 1997, she joined the newsroom of Informativos Telecinco in Catalonia. A year later, in 1998, she became presenter and editor of Informativos Telecinco Cataluña, in the morning and at midday. She presented special programs such as electoral programs and other major events and was moderator of political debates in the regional elections.

From September 2001, she presented Informativos Telecinco 14:30 and, as of September 2004, she became the presenter and co-editor of Informativos Telecinco Fin de Semana. She has also hosted special programs such as those dedicated to the death of John Paul II, the 11-M and T4 Barajas bombings, the Formula 1 Grand Prix in Montmeló, the Royal Wedding between Felipe de Borbón and Letizia Ortiz and election specials.

From January 9, 2017, after twelve years at Informativos Telecinco Fin de Semana, she presented Noticias Cuatro, from Monday to Friday, replacing Marta Fernández. After the cancellation of this news program, between February and November 2019, she hosted the current affairs program Cuatro al día. Later, in 2020, she returned to Telecinco to present the docu-reality Mujeres al poder.

Chaparro is also a member of the Club de las 25, a contributor to Yo Dona magazine, a talk show host on Punto Radio, a contributor to Mujer Hoy magazine and a coach for corporate spokespersons.

== Awards ==
In 2017 she won the Primavera Novel Prize for No soy un monstruo, her first book.

In 2018 she received the Award of the Observatory against Domestic and Gender Violence, in recognition of "her firm commitment to freedom, equality and women's rights". She was presented with the award by Carmen Calvo, Vice President of the Government of Spain and the Minister of the Interior, Fernando Grande-Marlaska.

== Trajectory ==
=== Presenter ===
Year	Program	Channel	Role
1998–2001	Informativos Telecinco Cataluña	Telecinco	Presenter
2001–2004	Informativos Telecinco 14:30	Telecinco	Presenter
2004–2017	Informativos Telecinco Fin de Semana	Telecinco	Presenter
2017–2019	Noticias Cuatro	Cuatro	Presenter
2019	Cuatro al día	Cuatro	Presenter
2021 – present	Mujeres al poder	Telecinco and Cuatro	Presenter
2021	Los teloneros	Cuatro	Co-Presenter
2021 – present	Todo es mentira	Cuatro	Presenter
2022 – present	En el punto de mira	Cuatro	Reporter

=== Guest ===
Year	Program	Channel	Role
2018	De mayor quiero ser (escritora como Carme Chaparro)	Mitele	Guest
2019	Adivina qué hago esta noche	Cuatro	Guest
2021	Rocío, contar la verdad para seguir viva	Telecinco	Guest

== Literary works ==
=== Crime novel ===
No decepciones a tu padre (Planeta, 2021).

La química del odio (Planeta, 2018).

No soy un monstruo (Planeta, 2017).

=== Non-fiction ===
Calladita estás más guapa (Planeta, 2019).

== Private life ==
She is married to Bernabé Domínguez and they began their relationship in 1999. On August 31, 2011, Carme gave birth to her first daughter, Laia. In September 2013 she gave birth to her second daughter, Emma.

Carme suffers from Ménière's disease, as she herself has declared.
