= Gustavo Lamos =

Colombian footballer (born 1990)

Personal information
- Full name: Gustavo Adolfo Lamos Cárdenas
- Date of birth: 30 January 1990 (age 36)
- Place of birth: Florida, Valle del Cauca, Colombia
- Height: 1.70 m (5 ft 7 in)
- Position: Midfielder

Youth career
- Estrellas 2000

Senior career*
| Years | Team | Apps | (Gls) |
- Estrellas 2000
| 2009 | → América de Cali (loan) | 0 | (0) |
| 2009 | → Jagiellonia Białystok (loan) | 1 | (0) |
| Total | | 1 | (0) |
- * Club domestic league appearances and goals

Gustavo Adolfo Lamos Cárdenas (born 30 January 1990) is a Colombian former footballer who played as a midfielder.

== Club career ==
Born in Florida in the Valle del Cauca Department of Colombia, Lamos began his career with local side CF Estrellas 2000. In 2009, he was loaned to Categoría Primera A side América de Cali, but after struggling for first-team football, he returned to Estrellas 2000.

Later in the same year he was loaned again, this time to Polish Ekstraklasa side Jagiellonia Białystok, where he lodged with club captain Tomasz Frankowski, who said of Lamos: "Gustavo has potential, he moves the ball quickly, he has good dribbling skills, but he has some things to improve. I hope that during these two months he will get enough of it tactically and physically". During his time with the club, he made one appearance, coming on as a substitute for Kamil Grosicki in a 2–1 away loss to Wisła Kraków on 29 August 2009. Despite signing on a one-year loan deal, he left the club in late 2009, and in 2010 would state that he was close to reaching an agreement to join permanently, but after failing to agree on terms, he returned to Colombia.

He competed in the 2010 edition of Football Cracks, a Spanish reality TV show dedicated to finding young footballing talent from around the world, sponsored by both Zinedine Zidane and Enzo Francescoli, and hosted by Nico Abad. He was one of seventeen players selected for the final group, before eventually coming fourth in the competition.

== Career statistics ==
=== Club ===
Appearances and goals by club, season and competition
| Club | Season | League | | | Cup | | Other | | Total | |
| Club | Season | Division | Apps | Goals | Apps | Goals | Apps | Goals | Apps | Goals |
|---|---|---|---|---|---|---|---|---|---|---|
| América de Cali (loan) | 2009 | Categoría Primera A | 0 | 0 | 0 | 0 | 0 | 0 | 0 | 0 |
| Jagiellonia Białystok (loan) | 2009–10 | Ekstraklasa | 1 | 0 | 0 | 0 | 0 | 0 | 1 | 0 |
| Career total | | | 1 | 0 | 0 | 0 | 0 | 0 | 1 | 0 |
