= Nico Abad =

Spanish television presenter

- Born: Nicolás Abad; 27 March 1970 (age 56); Madrid, Spain
- Occupations: Television presenter; live streamer
- Years active: 1998–present
- Employers: Telecinco; (2013–2020); Cuatro; (2017–2020)

Nicolás Abad (Madrid, March 27, 1970), better known as Nico Abad, is a Spanish television presenter. He has also worked as an editor.

== Biography ==
His career began in 1998, working on Elías Querejeta's "El partido del siglo" in episodes paying tribute to former footballers Francisco Gento and Ferenc Puskás. From 1990 to 2000 he worked for Canal+ as a sports editor.

After his long tenure at Canal+, he was co-director of the Disney Channel League until 2003, when he returned to Canal+ to present Lo + Plus, where he made his first appearances in front of the cameras in the sports and current affairs sections.

In 2004, he started a new project together with Spanish journalist Raquel Sánchez Silva called La hora Wiki, a youth magazine show. In November 2005, he presented on Cuatro: Soy el que más sabe de televisión del mundo, although it was cancelled due to low ratings.

In 2006, during the 2006 World Cup in Alemania he presented the program Maracaná Germany 06 together with journalist Àngels Barceló and presented the preview of a Spain national team match in a program called Zona Cuatro. After the World Cup he presents Family Rock in July and August. In September and until November, he presents the second season of Soy el que más sabe de televisión del mundo (I am the one who knows the most about television in the world), but only on Saturdays. He presented the Disney Christmas gala at the end of 2006.

In 2007, he presented the Gran Slam contest and is currently the presenter of the sports section of Noticias Cuatro along with Juanma Castaño.

In 2008, he presented, along with Àngels Barceló the program Zona Cuatro, which previewed the matches of the Euro 2008 held in Austria and Switzerland.

Since September 2011, he has combined his work at Deportes Cuatro with his contributions to the sports section of the magazine show Las mañanas de Cuatro, presented by Marta Fernández.

In March 2013, he joined the Mediaset Sport team in charge of broadcasting the MotoGP races along with Melissa Jiménez. However, his way of broadcasting the races was strongly criticized by the fans, and there were even petitions on the Internet for him to be removed from the broadcasts due to his shouting, his excessive impetus and his continuous mistakes during the broadcasts.

On 1 September 2014, he returned to Sports Cuatro Noche in place of Jesus Gallego, but on 19 September 2016 he jumped to Sports Cuatro 1 with Mano Carreñoo in place of Manolo Lama, although on 24 September 2017 he returned to Sports Cuatro Noche until 8 June 2020.

In mid-2020 he was fired from Mediaset after being accused by Mediaset of not complying with the exclusivity terms of his contract.

In autumn 2022 she was a contestant on MasterChef Celebrity 7 on La 1.

After several legal disputes the network had to compensate him with almost 300,000 euros for unfair dismissal. He is currently a content creator on Twitch.

== TV career ==
- El partido del siglo on Canal+, collaborator. (1990)
- Deportes on Canal+, editor and reporter. (1990-2000)
- Lo + plus on Canal+, reporter and collaborator, deportes. (2003-2004)
- La Hora Wiki on Canal+, cohost. (2004-2005)
- Soy el que más sabe de televisión del mundo on Cuatro, host. (2005-2006)
- Maracaná Alemania 06 on Cuatro, c-ohost. (2006)
- Zona Cuatro previo de los partidos de la Selección en el Mundial 2006 on Cuatro, co-host. (2006)
- Family Rock concurso familiar on Cuatro, host. (2006)
- Gala de Navidad de Disney on Cuatro, host. (2006)
- Gran Slam concurso on Cuatro, host. (2007)
- Deportes Cuatro, on Cuatro, co-host. (2007-2013)
- Zona Cuatro previo a los partidos de la Selección en la Eurocopa 2008 on Cuatro, co-host. (2008)
- Football Cracks on Cuatro, co-host. (2010)
- Zona Cuatro previo de los partidos emitidos por Cuatro del Mundial 2010 on Cuatro, co-host. (2010)
- Las mañanas de Cuatro, sección de deportes on Cuatro, collaborator. (2011)
- MotoGP, on Telecinco, host. (2013-2016)
- Deportes Cuatro, on Cuatro, host (2016-2017)
- Deportes Telecinco, on Telecinco, host (2017-2020)
- El Mundial se juega en Mediaset, on Be Mad, host from 23:00 to 00:00 from June 14, 2018, to July 16, 2018, summaries, talk shows, interviews of the most important events concerning the 2018 World Cup.
