= Felipe Mellizo =

Spanish journalist and writer

- Born: Felipe Mellizo Cuadrado; 8 November 1932; Córdoba, Spain
- Died: 7 July 2000 (aged 67); Madrid, Spain
- Occupations: Journalist, writer and news anchor
- Years active: 1970–2000

Felipe Mellizo Cuadrado (8 November 1932 – 7 July 2000) was a Spanish writer, journalist and news anchor.

During his career he was anchor of TVE's flagship newscast Telediario among other TV shows in the public network, including ¿Un Mundo Feliz? and La Clave. Between July and November 1992 he anchored the weekend editions of Informativos Telecinco. In 1995 he hosted on Radio Nacional de España the late-night newscast 24 horas.

== Works ==
- Notas alemanas (1962)
- Europa, de papel (1962)
- Los redimidos (1962)
- El lenguaje de los políticos (1968)
- Sir Gawayn y el Caballero Verde (1968)
- Arturo, rey (1976)
- Literatura y enfermedad (1979)
- De letras y números (1986)
- Otra manera de cantar el tango (1986)
- Escríticos (1983)
- Mientras agonizo (1991)
