= Cristina Saavedra =

Spanish journalist

- Born: Cristina Saavedra Pita; 13 November 1975 (age 49); A Coruña, Spain
- Occupation(s): Journalist and television presenter

Cristina Saavedra Pita (A Coruña, Spain, November 13, 1975) is a Spanish journalist.

== Biography ==
With a degree in journalism from the University of Santiago de Compostela, she began her professional career as a reporter at Televisión de Galicia, where she later worked as a news anchor for four years.

Later, she would make the leap to national television, becoming a popular face thanks to the program Ahora, a space that began daily (Monday to Friday) and that was initially co-presented along with the Galician journalist Liborio Garca. Finally, he took over the program alone, and the frequency of the program became weekly, on Saturdays. Ahora was broadcast on Antena 3 for almost six years, from 2000 until the summer of 2006, airing more than five hundred programs.

Shortly after the end of Ahora, Saavedra joined La Sexta, where she returned to the news genre. From September 2006 until the end of 2012, she was the substitute presenter of the Sunday evening news program La Sexta Noticias. She currently presents La Sexta Noticias 2ª Edición (20h).

Also important is the fact that she is in charge of the NGO Global Humanitaria's project in Ivory Coast.

In 2016, she was awarded the Antena de Oro Award, given annually by the Federation of Associations of Radio and Television of Spain, for her work as presenter of Noticias 20 Horas, on La Sexta.

The presenter participates in 2017, on a recurring basis, in the series La casa de papel, by Antena 3, in her role as presenter of La Sexta Noticias, becoming part of 8 episodes.

== Filmography ==
=== Television series ===
Year	Series	Channel	Character	Duration
2002	Un paso adelante	Antena 3	Herself	1 episode
2017 – 2020	La casa de papel	Antena 3 / Netflix	TV Presenter	11 episodes
