= Carlos Carnicero =

Spanish journalist and politician (1951–2025)

- Born: Carlos Carnicero Giménez de Azcárate; 9 September 1951; Zaragoza, Spain
- Died: 1 July 2025 (aged 73); Madrid, Spain
- Notable work: Canal Sur, El Periódico de Catalunya, Europa Press, Telecinco, 13TV and the magazine Viajar

Carlos Carnicero Giménez de Azcárate (9 September 1951 – 1 July 2025) was a Spanish journalist, presenter and politician. During the last years of the Franco dictatorship and the beginning of the Spanish Transition, he was federal secretary of organization of the Carlist Party, which was then part of the Democratic Junta in the opposition to the Franco regime. He was a candidate for the Congress of Deputies in 1977, as number 2 of the list of the Aragonese Autonomist Front in Zaragoza, and in 1979, as number 1 on the list of the Carlist Party of Euskadi in Guipúzcoa.

== Background ==
Carnicero was born in Zaragoza on 9 September 1951. He died in Madrid on 1 July 2025, at the age of 73.

== Written press ==
With degrees in law and economics from the Basque Country and Complutense University of Madrid, he began his professional career as a journalist in the print media. He contributed to El Diario Vasco and La Voz de España. He was director of the now-defunct magazine Contrapunto for two years.

In 1982, he joined the magazine Tiempo de Hoy, where he became deputy director and remained until 1988. In May of that year, he joined a new project and collaborated on the launch of a new publication: Tribuna. In June 1989, he joined Diario 16 as deputy editor, remaining in that position until 1991, when he was appointed editor of Panorama (Spanish magazine) (until 1993). After the publication of that magazine, he continued as editor of Viajar.

== Radio ==
Specialising in political analysis, Javier González Ferrari worked with him as a commentator on the first stage of the program La linterna (The Lantern) on Cadena COPE (Cope Channel) (1988-1989).

In September 1993, and again with Javier González Ferrari, he joined the discussion program Hora Cero on Antena 3 Radio and Onda Cero (Spain).

Between 1994 and 2011 he collaborated with the programs Hoy por hoy, Hora 25 and in the section La Tertulia de los Martes of the afternoon program La Ventana of the Cadena SER. In July 2011 he was fired from the station. He later collaborated with Radio Euskadi, ABC Punto Radio and Canal Sur.

== Television ==
His career in television dates back to 1989, when he co-hosted the news program "El Ruedo" on Telemadrid with González Ferrari. In 1992, with the help of Jesús Hermida, he participated as a regular guest on Hermida's show "El Programa de Hermida" on Antena 3, followed by "La Noche de Hermida" (1993).

A year later, in 1994, Antena 3 entrusted him with directing and hosting a reality show titled "Confesiones" in which anonymous people came to the set to recount events from their private lives. In January 1997, he replaced Miguel Ángel Aguilar on the program "Cruz y Raya" on Telecinco News. This segment featured Carnicero debating current affairs with journalist Luis Herrero. In the 1997-1998 season, the segment was renamed "Fuego cruzado," and Herrero was replaced by Federico Jiménez Losantos.

He analyzed current political events on the programs "La mirada crítica" on Telecinco and "59 segundos" on TVE. He was a regular contributor to ElPlural.com for a year (2010–2011).
