= Carles Francino =

Spanish journalist and TV presenter

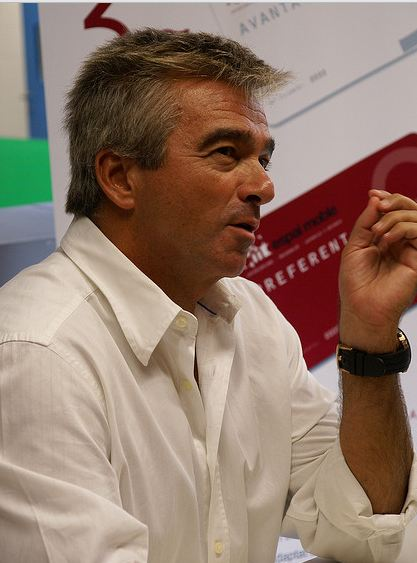
- Carles Francino
- Born: Carles Francino Murgades; 3 January 1958 (age 68); Barcelona, Spain
- Occupations: Journalist; TV presenter; radio personality
- Years active: 1979–present
- Presenting career
- Show: Hoy por hoy (2005–2012); La Ventana (2012–present)
- Station: Cadena SER
- Children: 3

Carles Francino Murgades (born 3 January 1958, in Barcelona) is a Spanish journalist. He started his career in Cadena SER Tarragona. In 1979 he got his first job at COPE Reus as a sports editor. Later, he joined the Tarragona studio of the COPE, which he left in 1987.

In 1990 he started in the world of television and he became part of the founding team of Canal+ in Madrid. There he worked as an editor and presented the evening news bulletin, being the presenter of the first program ever broadcast in the history of the channel.

In 1994 he returned to Barcelona to work at TV3, the channel where, for eleven years, he presented the evening edition (and briefly the midday edition) of Telenotícies. Whilst Carles Francino was at the helm, it became the most-viewed news bulletin in the Spanish region of Catalonia, beating all the national Spanish bulletins. His rigour and independence were recognized by both the audience and political critics. In 1999, he was awarded the City of Barcelona Award. In 2005, he joined Cadena SER to replace Iñaki Gabilondo as the presenter of the morning radio program Hoy por hoy. But in 2012, the network decided to move him to the afternoon radio program La Ventana.
