= Luis Mariñas =

Spanish journalist (1947-2010)

- Born: Luis Mariñas Lage; 7 August 1947; A Coruña, Spain
- Died: 27 December 2010 (aged 63); Madrid, Spain
- Occupations: Journalist and news anchor

Luis Mariñas Lage (7 August 1947 – 27 December 2010) was a Spanish journalist.

== Biography ==
Mariñas began his career in 1969 with Televisión Española, where he remained for the next twenty years. He worked in the regional center of TVE in Galicia, who became director between 1973 and 1976, after Luis Salguero Prieto, who was in charge between 1971 and 1973.

At the age of 19, he began working in the studios of TVE in Prado del Rey, Madrid, with Victoriano Fernández Assisi, Jesus Alvarez and Miguel de la Quadra-Salcedo. By then participated in the founding of one of the first general magazines of large circulation which was titled Personas. He also was an exhaustive collaborator of RNE.

In 1981 he was appointed as the head of the national news division of TVE. In 1982 he was appointed director of the 15:00 edition of Telediario and between 1983 and 1984 he subsequently presented the nightly edition, which aired at 21:00. In March 1982, he was appointed director and host of the 15:00 edition of the newscast, which became the second youngest professional (the first being Lalo Azcona) that he combined both functions for the public broadcaster. In those days, with no private television, the average audiences were 16 million people. In 1985 he left TVE and was appointed adviser to the Minister for Relations with Parliament and the Government Secretariat, Virgilio Zapatero. He returned to TVE and hosted Telediario in 1987 until 1990.

That same year, 1990, he was hired by Valerio Lazarov, then head of the fledgling TV station Telecinco to set in motion the news on the radio. Thus, on May 3, 1990, he presented Entre hoy y mañana, a small news brief for just fifteen minutes, which over the years would be extending its duration to become the current Informativos Telecinco. Curiously, some of the spaces of this program were presented by Julio Fernandez, although retained as the editor for the programme. He also directed and presented other talk shows and interviews, such as Mesa Redonda (1993) and Hora Límite (1995). On May 31, 1993, he moderated the second televised debate between Felipe González and José María Aznar for the general elections that was held six days later.

In 1998 he was relieved of his position at Telecinco and left to return to TVE, where for five years, from January 1999 until 2004, he hosted the morning newscast Los Desayunos de TVE. Among his most important works contained, he went to Baghdad and interviewed with the then Iraqi President Saddam Hussein, shortly before the first Gulf War. He also interviewed Mikhail Gorbachev after the disintegration of the USSR.

He also collaborated with various newspapers, Diario 16, La Voz de Galicia, Digital Journal, Metro, and was fellow member of La Linterna de la Cope with Luis Herrero.

In 2004 he joined Telemadrid to take over Telenoticias 2. In 2005 he left that job to host the divulgative program Años Luz. In February 2007 he was hired by Canal Sur, to take over the program Vista Pública, which he hosted for a year and a half.

Mariñas died on 27 December 2010, aged 63.
