= Los Desayunos de TVE =

- Genre: News
- Directed by: Nacho García Mostazo
- Presented by: Julio César Iglesias (1994–1996); Javier González Ferrari (1996–1999); Luis Mariñas (1999–2004); Pepa Bueno (2004–2009); Ana Pastor (2009–2012); María Casado (2012–2016); Sergio Martín Herrera (2016-2018); Xabier Fortes (2018-2020)
- Country of origin: Spain
- Original language: Spanish

Production
- Camera setup: Multi-camera
- Running time: 100 minutes
- Production company: Televisión Española

Original release
- Network: La 1
- Release: January 8, 1994 – July 17, 2020

Los Desayunos de TVE (English: TVE's Breakfasts) was a Spanish breakfast television news program, primarily broadcasting on weekdays on La 1 of TVE from January 8, 1994 to July 17, 2020.

== Format ==
The show consists of an interview with the host of the show, accompanied by journalists from prestigious relevance to a particular political character, but also social, cultural, economic, artistic, sports or media. Then develops a gathering of political content among journalists present on the set.

== History ==
During the first years, Los Desayunos de TVE was once known under the title of Los Desayunos de Radio 1 because TVE2 was broadcast simultaneously by the Radio Nacional de España, as part of the segment Mañanas de Radio 1, hosted by Julio César Iglesias. Iglesias was in charge of conducting the interviews and he was always accompanied by journalists Diego Carcedo - Director, at the time of RNE - and Antonio San José.

=== The departures of Carcedo and San José ===
In 1996, both Carcedo and San José left RNE and therefore the program. The trio of interviewers then passes consist of Iglesias, Alejo García and Javier González Ferrari, the new Director of RNE, which became primarily responsible for the program. Just a year later, Carlos Dávila and Isabel San Sebastián, alternatively, occupied the post of Alejo Garcia. In September 1996, the show was transferred to TVE1 and was renamed Los Desayunos de Radio Nacional. In return, the morning edition of La 2 Noticias was also absorbed by the Telediario brand and Los Desayunos moved its starting time to 9:00am. In 1997, it was finally renamed to its current name, Los Desayunos de TVE.

=== Appointments of directors and the head of TVE's news services ===
Following the appointment of González Ferrari as head of the News Services of TVE, the Galician journalist Luis Mariñas who - since January 1999 - took over presenting the program, where he stayed for six seasons until 2004. During this period the program was hosted by several collaborators as Juancho Armas Marcelo, Consuelo Sánchez Vicente, Isabel Duran, Esther Esteban, Fernando Jáuregui and Charo Zarzajuelos.

=== Hosts ===
Since that year, Los Desayunos was hosted by Pepa Bueno, with José Ribagorda as the subdirector (until 2006). Bueno has been accompanied on camera by journalists Joaquin Estefanía, Enric Sopena, Juan Jose Millas, Charo Zarzalejos, Esther Jaén, Lucia Mendez, Oscar Campillo, Anabel Diez and Victoria Prego.

Between September 2009 and July 2012, the presentation of the program was taken over by the journalist Ana Pastor. In August this year the host of "Los Desayunos" was dismissed from office by the director of TVE Julio Somoano. She said: "She was dismissed for making Journalism". On August 21 he announced that María Casado would be her replacement.

It is announced that Casado would be leaving the show in September 2016, after 4 years. She would be moving to the daytime talkshow, La Mañana de la Primera, for a brand new season in early September 2016. Sergio Martín Herrera from Canal 24 Horas would be her replacement. He remained the presenters of the show from 2016 to 2018. In 2018, Xabier Fortas would become the new host of the show.

=== The end of Los Desayunos ===
Due to the restructuring of the morning strip of Spanish Television's La Primera, the program said goodbye on July 17, 2020 after 26 years on the air and its schedule will be included in the new morning magazine, La hora de La 1, which will be broadcast from the 2020-2021 season.
