= Hilario Pino =

Spanish journalist

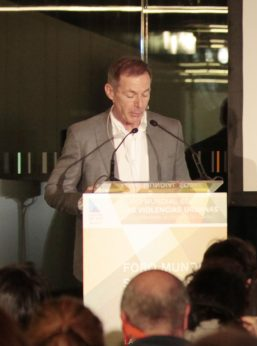
- In 2017
- Born: 20 February 1962 (age 64); San Martín de Pusa, Toledo, Spain
- Occupations: Journalist and news anchor

Hilario Pino (born 20 February 1962 in San Martín de Pusa) is a Spanish journalist and news anchor and since 2011 is the presenter of the news program Noticias Cuatro in its noon edition.

== Career ==
Having his title from the Complutense University of Madrid, Pino started his career in the news agency "OTR" between 1982 and 1985. Later he was hired by Cadena SER where he worked as an economy newsreader.

=== Telemadrid (1989–1994) ===
His ascending career began in the summer of 1989 when he debuted in the then brand-new public channel Telemadrid to anchor the main evening newscast Telenoticias. He stayed there until 1994.

He also did alternate anchoring on the news program 30 Minutos (1991–1992) and the opinion program Aquí y Ahora. Also in 1993 he helped Antena 3 Radio anchoring the program El primero de la mañana.

=== Canal+ and CNN+ (1994–2001) ===
Pino was hired in 1994 by Canal+ to replace Carlos Francino in the news program Redacción where he stayed until 2001.

In 1998 he also began anchoring in CNN+ and between 1999 and 2001 anchored the interview program Cara a cara. During this period it became popular his toon version in the comedy program Las noticias del guiñol.

=== Telecinco and Cuatro (2001-present) ===
In 2001 Telecinco hired Hilario Pino to host the 2:30 p.m. edition of Informativos Telecinco. Pino remained as anchor until late-2006, when he resigned as anchor due to his cancer treatment.

On 26 March 2007 Hilario Pino returned, with a new look, to the anchor chair where it remained until late 2010. Since 10 January 2011, as result of the fusion between Prisa (Cuatro's owner) and Mediaset (Telecinco), Hilario began anchoring the afternoon edition of Noticias Cuatro.

== Awards and nominations ==
- 1989 TP de Oro as Telemadrid's most popular figure (won also in 1991)
- 1990 Antena de Oro by Telenoticias
- 2003 Premio ATV as Best communicator of news programs by Informativos Telecinco. (Nominated also in 2002 and 2004)
