= Las noticias del guiñol =

Spanish satirical news programme

Las noticias del guiñol ("The news of guignol") was a satirical news programme that aired on Canal+ (since 1995) and Cuatro (since 2005) in Spain. It is somewhat based on a similar programme airing on its sister Canal+ network in France, Les Guignols de l'info, in that it features latex puppets. Latex casts may be shared among countries with local celebrities being used as anonymous citizens in foreign shows. It was initially hosted by the puppets of Marta Reyero and Hilario Pino, the real hosts of the channel daily news. Later, its host was a facsimile of Michael Robinson, an English-born football pundit; and in the final seasons it was conducted by the puppet of Iker Jiménez (a presenter of the channel).

While Penélope Cruz has made some appearances, the program generally focuses on prominent athletes and political figures. Among other figures, the program features Pau Gasol, Raúl, Luis Aragonés, Florentino Pérez, Joan Laporta, Fernando Alonso, José Luis Rodríguez Zapatero, Mariano Rajoy, María Teresa Fernández de la Vega, José Bono, Pasqual Maragall, and Josep-Lluís Carod-Rovira. International figures who regularly appear include Woody Allen, David Beckham, Ronaldo, Ronaldinho, Samuel Eto'o, Louis van Gaal (who instead of a head has a cube made of bricks, probably an allusion to his well-known stubbornness) George W. Bush, Condoleezza Rice, Tony Blair, Silvio Berlusconi and Pope Benedict XVI.

Historically, prominent characters have included Felipe González (occasionally appearing as Cantinflas), José María Aznar and Jordi Pujol.

One of the most often quoted phrases attributed to former prime minister José María Aznar - "¡España va bien!" (literally "Spain is doing well").

While most programmes on Canal+ were scrambled for non set-top box subscribers, Las noticias del guiñol was broadcast unscrambled.

In November 2005 Canal+ ceased to exist as a partially encrypted terrestrial television channel (although it continued to exist on the Digital+ satellite platform). It was replaced by Spain's fifth national terrestrial channel Cuatro, the newest member of Jesús de Polanco's Sogecable media empire. Although the guiñoles were one of the very few programmes to make the transition from Canal+ to Digital+, the programme was rebranded for the new channel as Los guiñoles de Canal+. The programme started being shown on the free-to-air channel Cuatro. Since 2006, they were included as a section in the late-night show "Noche Hache". Its production ceased at the same time as that show, in July 2008.

The programme has won "Premio Ondas", the most prestigious TV prize in Spain to the scriptwriters Fidel Nogal and Gonzalo Tegel.

== See also ==
- Txoko-Latex, an earlier show featuring latex puppets of Basque politicians in Euskal Telebista.
