= David Cantero =

Spanish journalist (born 1961)

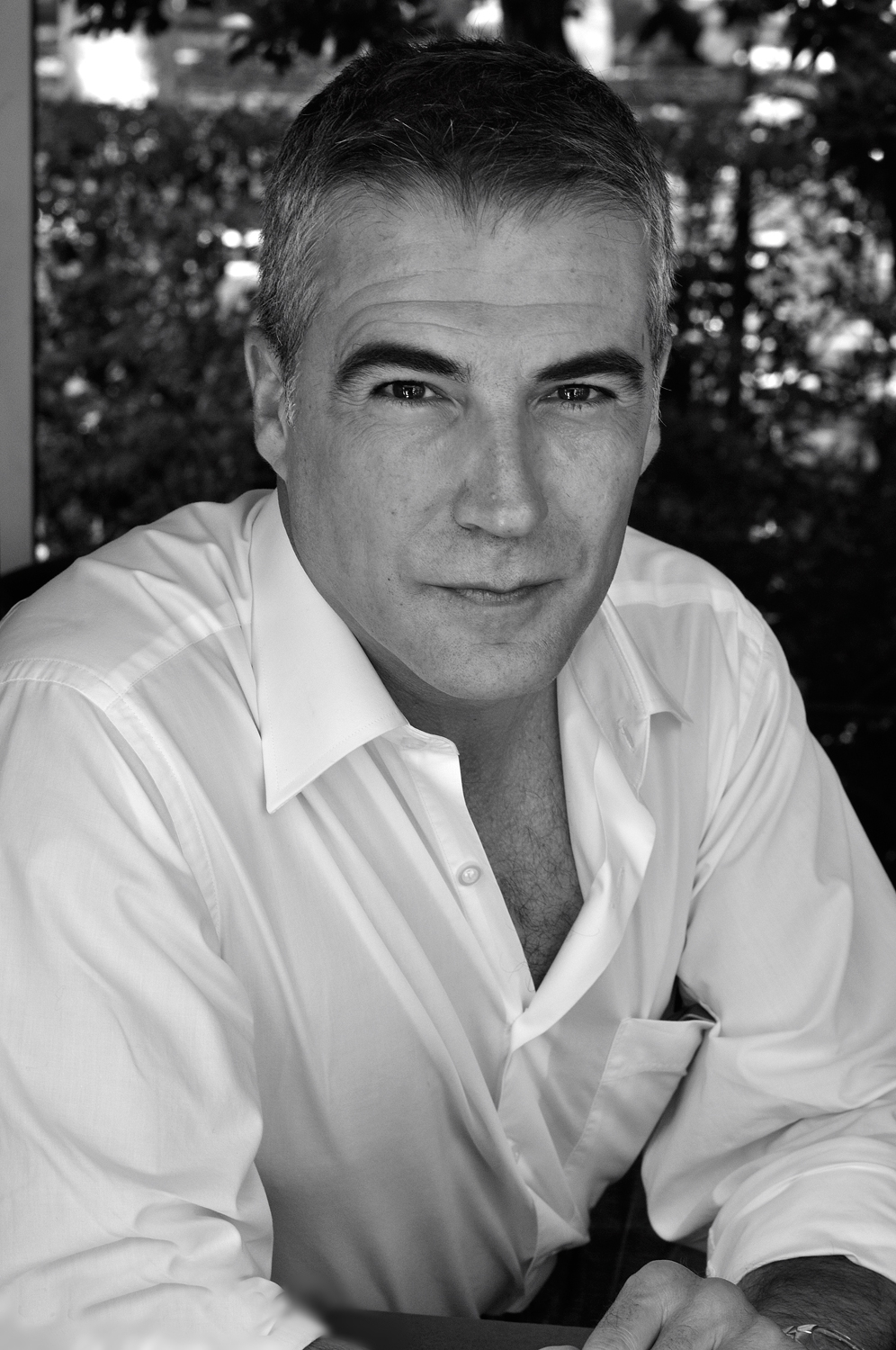
- Born: David Fernández Cantero; 1 March 1961 (age 65); Madrid, Spain
- Occupation: News anchor
- Years active: 1982–present

David Fernández Cantero (born 1 March 1961) is a Spanish broadcaster, news anchor, writer and painter.

Cantero joined Televisión Española (TVE) in 1982, after which he was hired by the regional headquarters of TVE in Andalucía. From 1988 to 1991 he was a correspondent for the Rome public TV network.

Between 2004 and 2010 he was the anchor for the weekend editions of Telediario, and between 2007 and 2009, the host of TVE's news magazine Informe Semanal, after which he anchored the La Entrevista program of the now-defunct channel Cultural.es.

Cantero began his current anchor position on 13 September 2010, on Telecinco's noon edition of its Informativos Telecinco. He left the newcast on 2 March 2025.
