= Concha García Campoy =

Spanish radio and TV journalist and personality

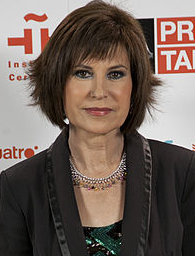
- Born: 28 October 1958; Terrassa (Barcelona), Spain
- Died: 10 July 2013 (aged 54); Valencia, Spain
- Occupations: Journalist and news anchor

Concepción García Campoy (28 October 1958 – 10 July 2013), also known as Concha García Campoy, was a Spanish radio and television journalist and personality.

== Career ==
She started her professional career in 1979 as local anchor in Cadena COPE of a current affairs program called Antena Pública. Later in 1983, she entered the News Service of Televisión Española for the Balearic Islands.

On 7 January 1985, she debuted as anchor of the noon edition of Telediario, along with Manuel Campo Vidal. During this period she also directed the morning program Las mañanas de Radio 1.

In 1987, she returned to radio after being hired by Cadena SER and started anchoring the program A vivir que son dos días. In 1991, she returned to TVE, where she anchored Mira 2. Two years later, was hired by Antena 3 Radio.

In 1994, she was anchor in Onda Cero of various programs, including Noches de radio.

In 1999, she again returned to television, this time in Telecinco where she hosted the movie-centered program La gran ilusión. She went back to radio in 2004 after being hired by Punto Radio.

In 2006, she was hired by Cuatro to anchor the morning magazine Las mañanas de Cuatro between 4 October and 24 December 2010. In January 2011, she was hired as anchor of the morning edition of Informativos Telecinco.

== Personal life ==
She was born in Terrassa but raised in Ibiza. She was married to the lawyer Jaime Roig and subsequently to the sociologist Lorenzo Díaz.

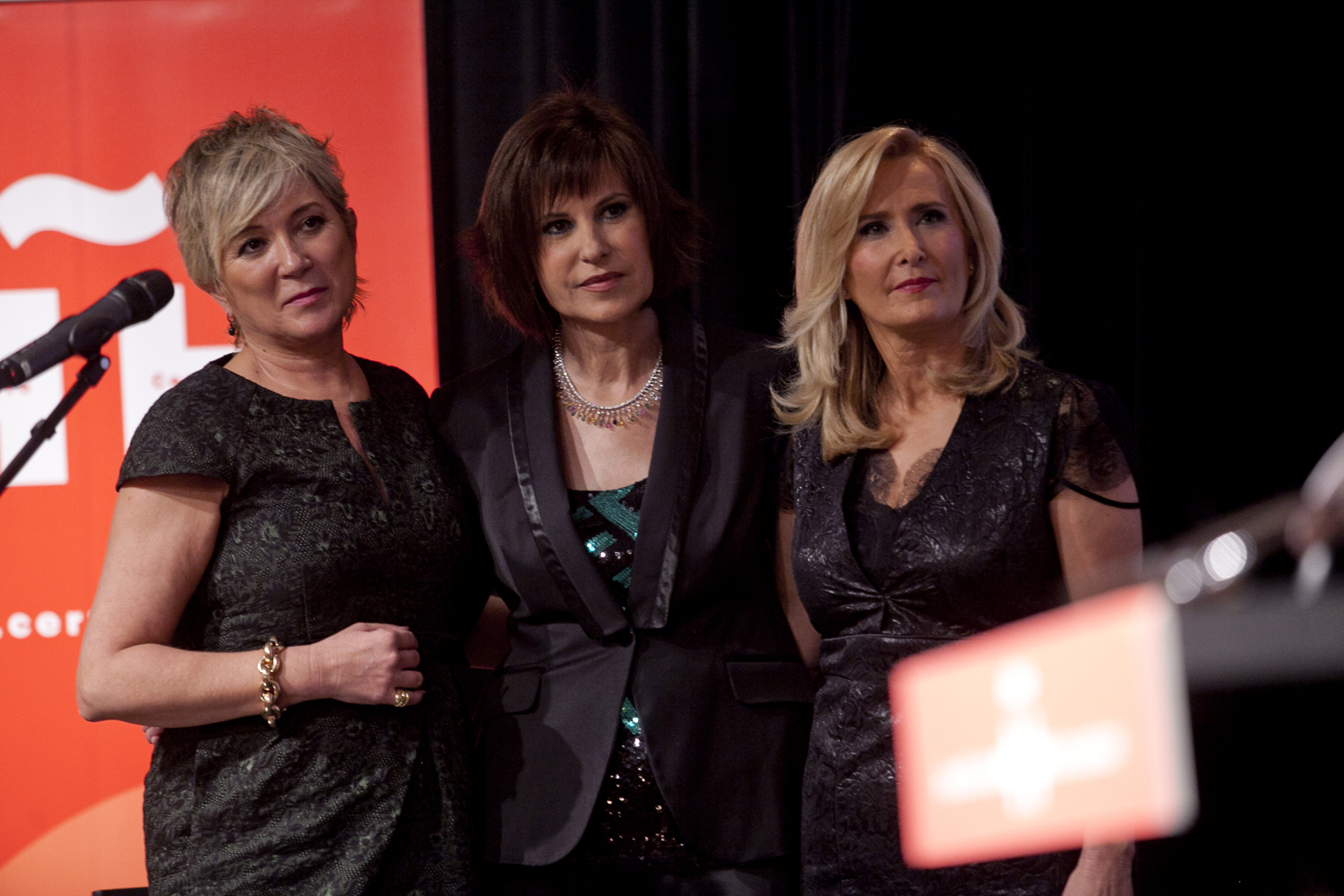
The journalists Inés Ballester, Concha García Campoy and Nieves Herrero, in 2012 talent awards

== Illness and death ==
In January 2012, García Campoy announced that she was diagnosed with leukemia and was stepping down as television anchor. Despite initially answering well to her treatment, in January 2013 she suffered a relapse.

García Campoy died on 10 July 2013 in a Valencia hospital, due to acute liver failure. Her funeral took place on 12 July in Madrid. It was attended by colleagues and politicians such as Tomás Gómez and Alfredo Pérez Rubalcaba . She was cremated and her ashes scattered on a beach in Ibiza.

== Filmography ==
- La chispa de la vida (2011)
- Sinfín (2005) as TV newscaster
- 7 vidas (2005) as vendedora
- Los peores años de nuestra vida (1994)
- La reina anónima (1992) as Enfermera
- La mujer de tu vida (1990)
- El rey del mambo (1989)
