= Valeriu Lazarov =

The Most Excellent Valeriu Lazarov
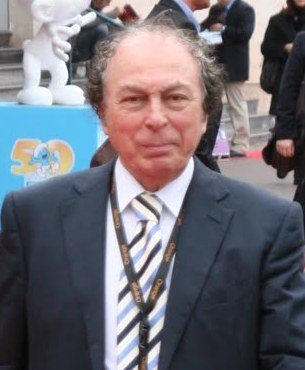
- Lazarov in April 2008
- Born: Valeriu Lazarov; 20 December 1935; Bârlad, Romania
- Died: 11 August 2009 (aged 73); Tres Cantos, Spain

Valeriu Lazarov or Valerio Lazarov (20 December 1935, Bârlad, Romania – 11 August 2009, Tres Cantos, Spain) was a Romanian-born television producer and director of several TV channels from Romania, Spain and Italy.

He defected to Spain in 1968, and was hired the same year by Juan José Rosón to work for Televisión Española. He became a Spanish citizen in 1972.

He was married seven times: twice in Romania before he defected to Spain in 1968, then in 1970, in Miami, to Cuban singer Elsa Baeza (with whom he has a son; they divorced in 1973), in 1978 to American actress Didi Sherman (they divorced in 1983), with whom he had two children, in 1989 to Italian Adonella Azzoni (divorced in 1996), with whom he has two children, to Sonia Costa (between 2001 and 2002), and in 2004, in Madrid, to Romanian Augusta Dumitraşcu, who is about 40 years his junior.

== Honors ==
- Gold Medal of Merit in Labour (Spain, 2004)
