= Sara Carbonero =

Spanish journalist (born 1984)

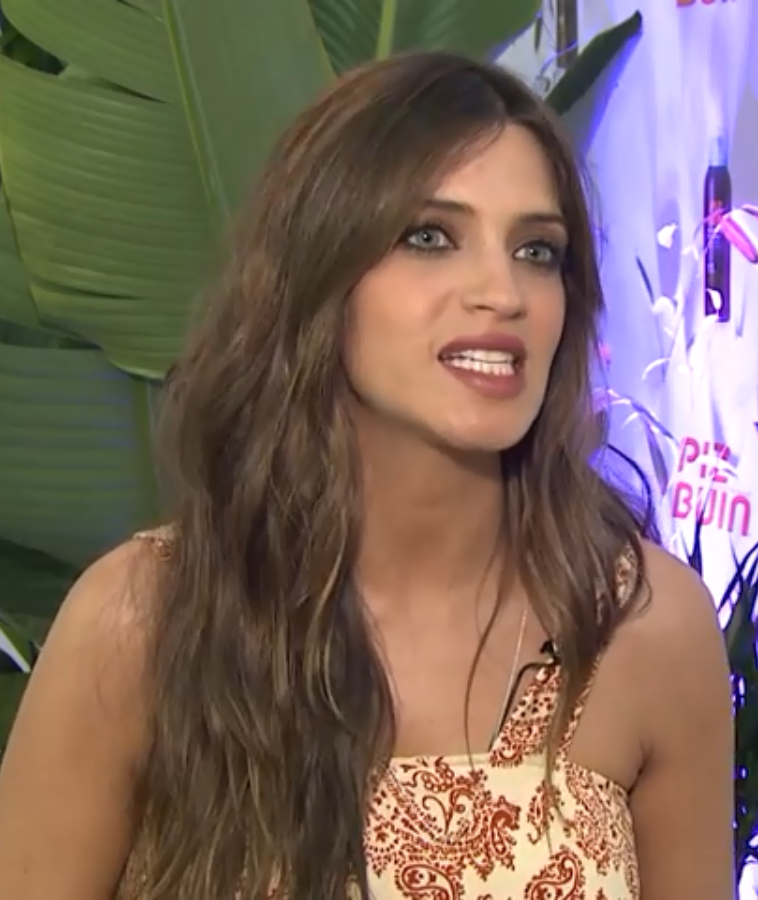
- Carbonero in 2016
- Born: 3 February 1984 (age 42); Corral de Almaguer, Spain
- Occupation: Sports journalist
- Spouse: Iker Casillas (m. 2016; div. 2021)
- Children: 2

Sara Carbonero Arévalo (born 3 February 1984) is a Spanish sports journalist. Since early 2000, she was a TV presenter for Telecinco, until she moved to Porto, in Portugal, when her ex-husband Iker Casillas joined Porto in July 2015.

== Career ==
When she was in the 3rd year of Journalism bachelor's from the Complutense University of Madrid, she entered as an intern at Radio Marca and six months later she was hired. In April 2009, she signed for Telecinco as editor and sports presenter.

In 2015, she created a clothing brand with two friends called slow love selling clothing, accessories and beauty products online.

In July 2016, she was introduced as a host of a fashion TV-show on Telecinco called "Quiero Ser" (I Want to Be).

=== 2010 World Cup coverage ===
During the 2010 FIFA World Cup it was alleged that Carbonero, reporting during the match between Spain and Switzerland, had distracted Casillas, causing the unexpected Swiss victory. Carbonero and her TV crew were standing near the Spanish end of the pitch less than 60 feet from the goal, where Casillas was. The allegations were made in the English press, originally by Graham Keeley of The Times and later repeated by several other English newspapers, prompting the Madrid-based Spanish newspapers El Mundo, El País and the popular sports daily Marca to all run articles suggesting that the claims were preposterous and untrue.

Questions were also raised about her journalistic integrity after she undertook to interview her boyfriend Casillas after the match. As a result of the controversy, Carbonero in Spain became "one of the most photographed people of the World Cup".

In July 2010 after the World Cup, it was announced that Carbonero would collaborate during the 2010–11 season with the Italian digital television platform Mediaset Premium, taking charge of information on the La Liga and especially on the career of José Mourinho in Real Madrid.

=== In the media ===
In July 2009, Carbonero was voted "The Sexiest Reporter in the World" by the American edition of FHM.

== Personal life ==
Carbonero was in a relationship with Spanish and then Real Madrid goalkeeper and captain Iker Casillas from 2009 to 2021. In January 2014, she gave birth to their son, Martín. In July 2015 Sara Carbonero and Iker Casillas moved to Porto, in Portugal, as the ex-Real Madrid goalkeeper signed for Porto. In November 2015, the couple announced they were expecting their second child. On 20 March 2016, the couple married. On 2 June 2016, Sara gave birth to the couple's second child, Lucas. On 12 March 2021, Carbonero and Casillas announced their mutual decision to separate after five years of marriage.

In May 2019, Carbonero underwent surgery to remove a malignant tumour on one of her ovaries and successfully recovered. In February 2021, Carbonero was once again hospitalized for what was speculated to be another cancer related surgery though she refused to confirm media reports about her health.
