= Hoy por hoy =

Spanish radio program

Hoy por hoy is a Spanish radio program, produced by the news department of the Cadena SER. It is the most listened-to radio program in Spain with an average of about three and a half million listeners a day. Directed and presented by the journalist Àngels Barceló, the program is broadcast from Monday to Friday, from 5:59 am to 12:19 pm, with the later 101 minutes (until 2 pm) dedicated to local opt-out broadcast from local studios. The program, on news and current affairs, spends the first 4 hours reviewing Spanish and international general information, especially political matters. It features live interviews with the most relevant figures of the day, including the main political leaders and leaders of government. The last two hours and nineteen minutes of the program are more relaxed with sections on different themes, and humour.

Hoy por Hoy began broadcasting on 22 September 1986, directed and presented by Iñaki Gabilondo who stayed until 2005. During its first years on the air it was rivalled by Protagonistas, which was then the leading morning program on Spanish radio. In the mid-1990s Hoy por hoy gained the highest listenership figures of more than three million a day. Today it is the most listened-to radio program in Spain.

On 30 August 2005 Gabilondo left the program to take charge of the evening news program of the new television network Cuatro, belonging to the same media group as Cadena SER, the Grupo Prisa. Cadena SER replaced Gabilondo with Carles Francino, who presented and directed Hoy por hoy from 19 September 2005 to June 2012.
