= Antena de Oro =

Spanish TV awards

- Awarded for: Excellence in radio and television
- Country: Spain
- First award: 1962
- Website: http://www.federacionartv.com/antenas-de-oro.html

The Antena de Oro awards, created in 1962, are awarded annually by the Federation of Radio and Television Associations of Spain to the most outstanding professionals in the field of the audiovisual industry. The jury that decides the awards is made up of the professionals themselves. The sculptor of the award is Nacho Martin.
