= Iñaki Gabilondo =

Spanish journalist (born 1942)

The Most Excellent Iñaki Gabilondo
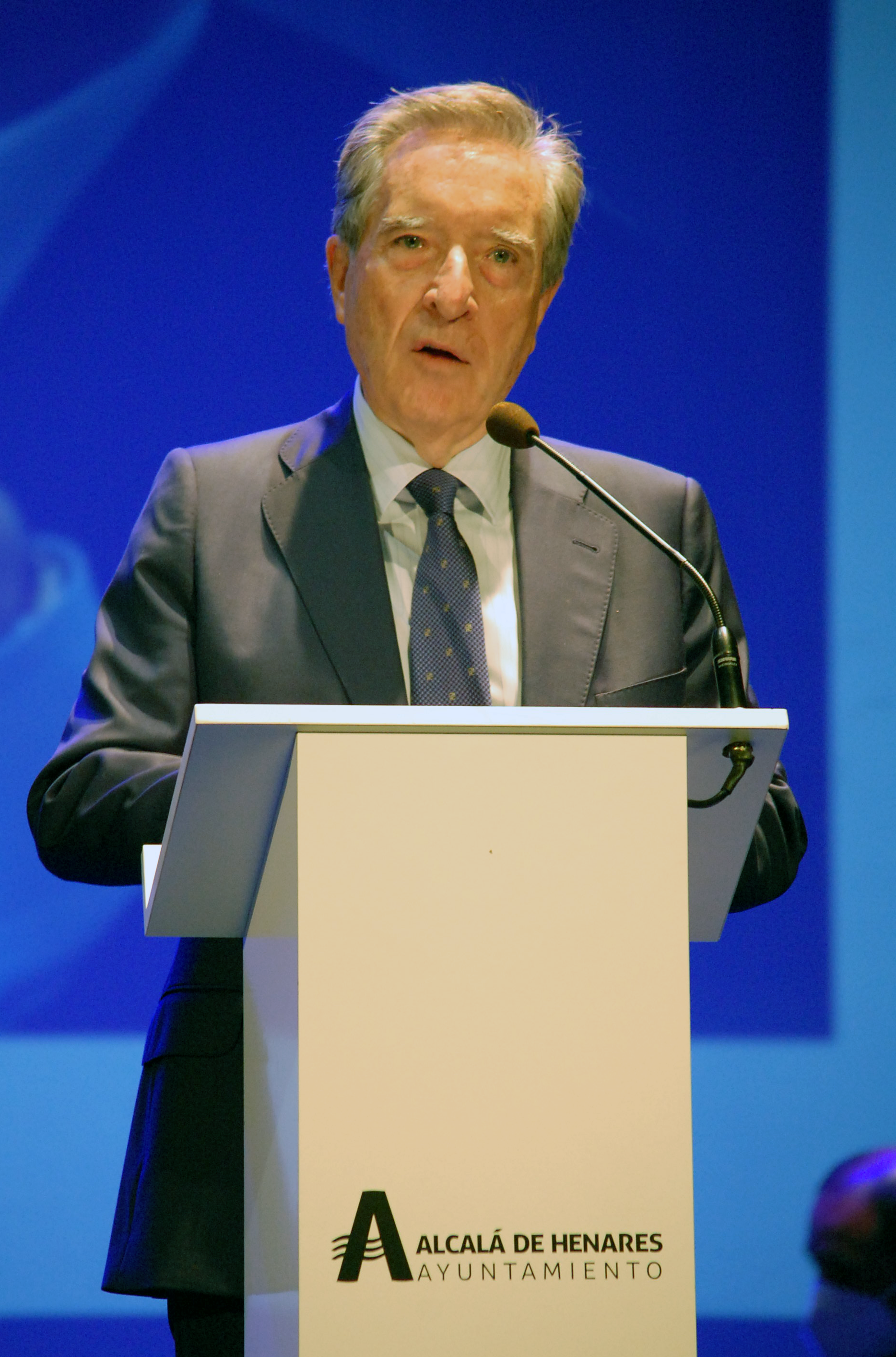
- Gabilondo in 2021.
- Born: José Ignacio Gabilondo Pujol; 19 October 1942 (age 83); San Sebastián, Basque Country, Spain
- Education: Licenciate in Philosophy & Letters and Journalism, University of Navarre, 1963.
- Occupations: Journalist; Broadcaster
- Years active: 1963–2022
- Employers: Cadena SER (1978–1980, 1986–2021); TVE (1981, 1987–1995); Euskal Telebista (1990–1991, 2012); Gestevisión Telecinco (1997); Cuatro (2005–2010); Movistar Plus+ (2015–2022)
- Notable work: Hoy por hoy (1986–2006)
- Television: Telediario (1981); Noticias Cuatro (2005–2010)
- Spouse(s): Maite Egaña (m. 1967–1981) Lola Carretero (m. 1993)
- Children: 3

José Ignacio Gabilondo Pujol (born 19 October 1942), better known as Iñaki Gabilondo, is a Spanish journalist and broadcaster. He is one of Spain's best-known news anchors.

== Biography ==
The second-born in a family of nine, Gabilondo studied Philosophy and Literature with Journalism at the University of Navarra. He started his career aged 21 at Radio Popular, which later became Cadena COPE. He stayed there until 1969, when he became the director of his local Radio San Sebastián, affiliated to the public Cadena SER. Two years later, he directed the news department of Cadena SER in Seville.

In 1978 he directed and hosted Hora 25 on Cadena SER in Madrid, until he became the TV news director of Televisión Española, the Spanish public TV network, two years later. After starting in January 1981, his first night in front of the cameras was during Antonio Tejero's coup d'etat on 23 February 1981. He soon started to host the 9pm edition of Telediario. He became well-known for covering the internal political tension in Leopoldo Calvo-Sotelo's government. After leaving Televisión Española, he directed Radio Televisión 16 for a short time, before coming back to Cadena SER, where he hosted Aquí la SER, Matinal SER, Pido la palabra and Onda Media.

On 22 September 1986, he started hosting Hoy por hoy, the main radio show in Spain that he would host for twenty years. Over time, his amicable presenting style made his show the most popular show, beating ratings records. He also kept up his TV appearances, on TVE-1's En familia from 1987 until 1989, and then his own chat show Iñaki, los jueves on regional channels in 1990. He returned to TVE to host Gente de primera in 1993, before swapping to Telecinco in 1996 to run the interviews on the then-most popular broadcast. Every general election, Gabilondo would run a set of interviews with all major candidates.

After almost twenty years, on 21 November 2005 it was announced that Gabilondo would leave Cadena SER to host the primetime news on Cuatro, Sogecable's new relaunched channel. He stayed there for four years, leaving in February 2010 after the confirmation of its merger with Telecinco. He later moved to CNN+ to present a news and debate program called Hoy ("Today") in 2010, until the channel's closure at the end of the year.

From 2011 until 2020 Gabilondo wrote occasionally for the newspaper El País and broadcast sporadically on Cadena SER. From 2011 until 2016 he hosted the monthly programme Iñaki on the pay-per-view Canal+ network. In 2012 he received the Premio Tomás y Valiente for his understanding of democracy and promotion of freedom, and also hosted the documentary Transición y democracia en Euskadi on ETB 2.

In 2012 Gabilondo criticised the Partido Popular for changing the selection of the board of RTVE, saying "The PP were warming up this decision with the most indecent campaign, that we remember as lashing out against TV professionals and against their work. Saying historic nonsense, like that such partisan TV had never been done before. The PP has rolled out some of its most illiterate to say such things when we've all had the opportunity to find out that it was completely the opposite."

Between 2015 and 2019 he hosted Cuando ya no este. El mundo dentro de 25 años on #0, as well as the 2018 special La vista atrás, celebrating forty years since the signing of the 1978 constitution. In the late 2010s, he also ran a podcast on Cadena SER, called Un cafe con Iñaki, which took a more relaxed approach to current affairs.

In September 2021 it was announced that Gabilondo would retire from broadcasting, ending his forty-nine years with Cadena SER. He presented his last TV programme, ¿Qué diablos es España? in November 2022 on #0.

He made an appearance on the relaunch of Noticias Cuatro on 29 January 2024, talking about his memories of the show's original era.

== Personal life ==
He married Maita Egaña Babace in 1967 until she died in July 1981. They had three children: Iñaki, born 1970; Urko, born 1972; and Ainhoa, born 1974. In 1993 he married for a second time to Lola Carretero Herranz, a fashion journalist whom he met on Hoy por hoy.

The second-born of a family of nine, many of his siblings followed Gabilondo into the journalistic profession. His brother Pedro is a sports journalist; Ramón is the director of Cadena SER in Bilbao. For the others: his brother Luis was the Health Secretary in Navarre; Javier is a businessman working in the meat industry; Jesús worked for ASPACE, a charity for cerebral palsy; and Ángel became a PSOE politician. His sister Lourdes became a missionary in Tuy-Vigo, Galicia; his sister Arantxa is a doctor.

He is the uncle of actress Estíbaliz Gabilondo and the cousin of forensic anthropologist and academic Francisco Etxebarria.

In 2019, Gabilondo spoke out against the Vox party, saying "It's Francoism, exactly what we wanted to get rid of." He quipped that PP leader Pablo Casado "should be called Casadox, because he's become a type of promoter of Vox's thinking... [Vox are] hidden behind all the hubbub created by the Partido Popular. Their car goes without them even spending a penny on fuel; others put it in for them."

== Honors ==
- 2005 – Gold Medal of Merit in Labour (Kingdom of Spain, 18 November 2005).
