= María Escario =

Spanish journalist and television presenter

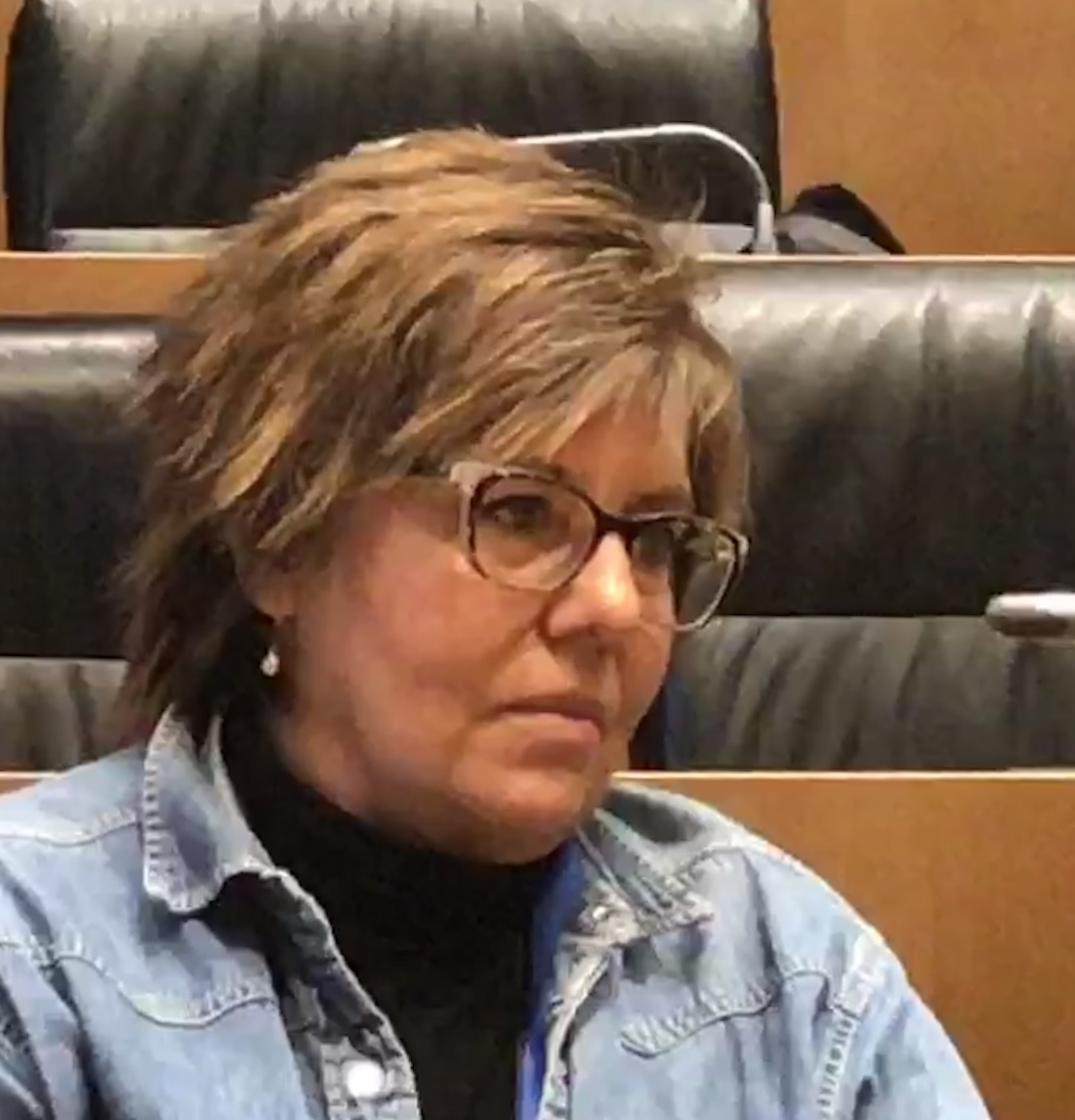
- Escario in 2018
- Born: María Esperanza Rodríguez Escario; 18 December 1959 (age 66); Madrid, Spain
- Education: Complutense University of Madrid
- Occupations: Journalist, presenter
- Years active: 1985–present
- Awards: Ondas Award (2013)
- Career
- Show: Telediario sports segment
- Station: La 1

María Esperanza Rodríguez Escario (born 18 December 1959) is a Spanish journalist and presenter on Televisión Española (TVE). In the mid-1980s she was one of the pioneers in Spanish women's sports journalism. Since then she has covered seven Summer Olympic Games and three World Cups. She is known for her work to increase the visibility of women's sports.

== Career ==
With a degree in journalism from the Complutense University of Madrid, María Escario began her career at a production company making educational videos for schools.

In 1985, she joined TVE, hired by Pedro Erquicia, and on this network she presented all editions of Telediario, the program 48 horas with Andrés Aberasturi, and the news show Buenos días with Pedro Erquicia. She has presented Estudio estadio and Estadio 2 (Sunday sports). For 21 uninterrupted years, until 2014, she worked on the different editions of Telediario.

Since 1989, she has been a pioneer in Spanish sports journalism, along with Olga Viza and Elena Sánchez. When she got to the sports office – she explained in one of her interviews – she started by covering rhythmic gymnastics since "star" sports were taken over by men.

Since September 2014, Escario has been in charge of making reports related to the world of sports on "Enfoque", a micro segment included in the second edition of La 1's Telediario (TD2), which deals with various topics in depth.

In February 2012 she was admitted to the hospital as the result of a stroke. This kept her off the air for several months until she returned in May.

In 2013, she received the Ondas Award for best presenter.

In 2014 she was awarded the TENA Lady Award for Successful Women for being one of the first women to specialize in sportscasting, to value the work of a journalist who has served to open the way for other professionals in a traditionally masculine world, and for promoting and making visible women's sports and equality between men and women.

From 2005 to 2015 she was a jury member of the Princess of Asturias Awards for Sports.

== Women and sports ==
In her professional career Escario has especially stood out in the defense of the visibility and equality of women's sports.

In January 2009, she participated in the presentation of the Manifesto for Equality and the Participation of Women in Sport.

When girls and boys play sports together seriously since they were little, these young people will learn to respect themselves, to work together, that in life sometimes they win and sometimes they lose...and all this will bring equality and less gender violence.

In 2014, during the delivery of the 2nd TENA Lady Award, she stated:

We are living a moment of success for women in the world of sports, but make no mistake, those successes mask a reality, and that is that women are positioning themselves where they belong in the world of sports, but not in sports management, which is also very important. Women win, but they are not in charge. The day they win out and lead we will start talking about something that has to do with equality.

In 2017, Escario received the Lilí Álvarez Award for "her work for the visibility of women's sports" in Spain in the first edition of these awards organized by the Women's Institute and the Sports Council to highlight the journalistic works that have best contributed to the defense of equality in sport. Specifically, she was awarded in the audiovisual category for the report "Rugby: el rugido de las leonas", broadcast on the TVE segment "Enfoque", about the women's national rugby team.

== Awards and recognitions ==
- 2002: nominated for the Iris Award as Best Communicator of News Programs for her work on Telediario
- 2011: Silver Medal for Sports Merit from the Sports Council
- 2013: Ondas Award for best presenter
- 2014: Prize in memory of Juan Manuel Gonzalo from the Spanish Olympic Committee
- 2014: TENA Lady Award
- 2015: Joan Ramón Mainat Award of the FesTVal de Televisión
- 2017: We Are All Students Award from the Movistar Student Club
- 2017: FEDEPE Award in the category of "Communication committed to women"
- 2017: First Lilí Álvarez Award from the Women's Institute and the Sports Council
