= Fernando González Delgado =

Spanish journalist, writer and politician (1947–2024)

Fernando Delgado
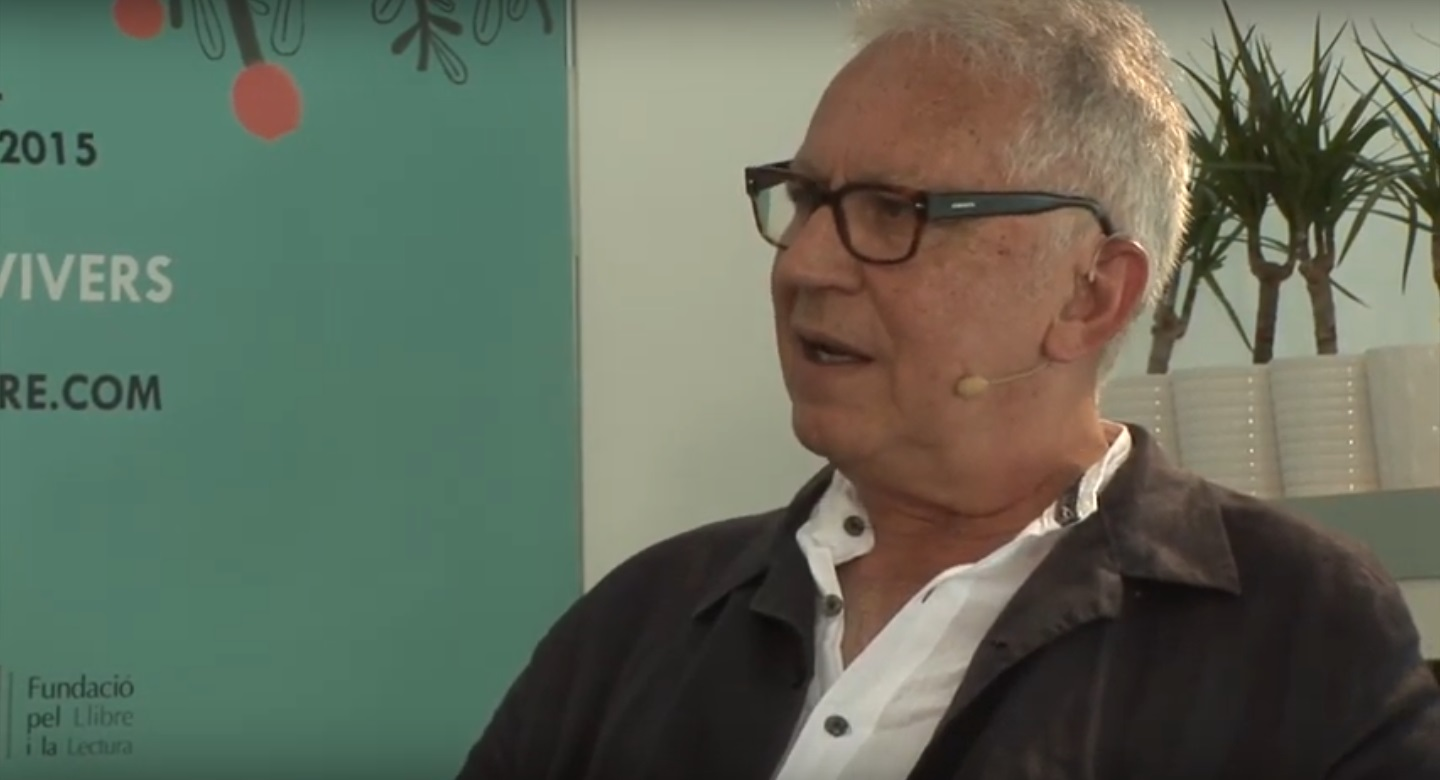

Member of the Corts Valencianes
- In office 2015–2019

Director of Radio Nacional de España
- In office 1990–1991
- Preceded by: Enric Sopena
- Succeeded by: Diego Carcedo
- In office 1982–1986
- Preceded by: Eduardo Sotillos
- Succeeded by: Eduardo Sotillos

Director of Radio 3
- In office 11 February 1981 – 1 December 1981
- Preceded by: Alfonso Gallego
- Succeeded by: Eduardo García Matilla

Personal details
- Born: Fernando Blas González Delgado; 1 February 1947 Santa Cruz de Tenerife, Spain
- Died: 18 February 2024 (aged 77) Faura, Spain
- Party: PSOE
- Education: Complutense University of Madrid
- Occupation: Journalist; Writer

Fernando Blas González Delgado (1 February 1947 – 18 February 2024) was a Spanish journalist, writer and politician. A member of the Spanish Socialist Workers' Party, he served as director of Radio 3 from February to December 1981 and was director of Radio Nacional de España from 1982 to 1986 and again from 1990 to 1991. He then served in the Corts Valencianes from 2015 to 2019.

González Delgado died in Faura on 18 February 2024, at the age of 77.

== Career ==
He has a bachelor's degree in information science in journalism from the faculty of information sciences at the Complutense University of Madrid and a technician with a diploma in radio and television, education, philosophy and dramatic arts. He has worked for the newspapers El Día, Pueblo, Informaciones and El País, specialising in literary and cultural critique. Later, through a competitive examination, he won a place as an announcer for the Radio Nacional de España in 1967.

He moved to Madrid in 1971, to work in the department of Foreign Broadcasting (which later became Radio Exterior de España), where came to be the coordinator of the Área de Cultura, working alongside José Hierro, Sofía Noel, Félix Grande and Luis Antonio de Villena. During the transition period, he began to create form his department a team of young people that would later help to form Radio 3. Notable members of this group were: Alfonso Gil, Rosa Salgado, Javier Maqua, Gloria Berrocal, Carlos Faraco y Pedro Piqueras.

In 1976 he published his first novel, Tachero.

In February 1981 he was named as the director of Radio 3, a broadcaster directed towards young people and university students, initially constructed with the Tercer Programa of Radio Nacional as a foundation. After putting into motion an ambitious project, the arrival of Carlos Robles Piquer as the director general of RTVE, led to his dismissal and replacement with Eduardo García Matilla in December of the same year. Very soon after, a change in policy put him at the head of RNE, of which he was the director from: 1982-1986 and 1990-1991. Under his first term he carried out a profound renovation of the formats and contents used. Other professionals like Luis del Olmo, Jesús Quintero, Alejo García and Julio de Benito also left public programming.

In 1986 he was named as a board member of RTVE, at the request of PSOE, and until 1990.

In 1991 he was a director at Tele-Expo, the television channel of the Seville Expo in 1992. Once this was finished, in February 1993 he, along with María Escario, became a presenter of Telediarios Fin de semana from Televisión Española, replacing Rosa María Mateo.

In 1994 the author's most personal work, Háblame de ti, was published, and one year later he won the Premio Planeta prize for La mirada del otro. He also wrote poetry (Proceso de adivinaciones and Autobiografía del hijo) and the essay Cambio de tiempo (1994).

In 1996, after the renovation of the RTVE directive team, he was dismissed from his post at the head of news programming. He returned to radio, outside of the sphere of public radio, and joined Cadena SER with A vivir que son dos días, a programme on art, culture, leisure and news, which would gain the biggest audience in its weekend time slot. He left in 2005 to dedicate himself to literature.

He was a member of PSPV-PSOE (Socialist Party of Valencia), and a deputy for that part from 2015 to 2019. On 11 June 2015, he opened the new Cortes Valencianas legislature as a member of the 'Mesa de Edad' (old table), being the oldest deputy.

He died on 18 February 2024 in Faura (Valencia), at 77 years old, after a long struggle with ill-health.

== Personal life ==
He was married to the Valencian lawyer Pedro García Reyes, for which reason he moved to live in Faura in the mid-1990s and had his political career in the Community of Valencia.

== Awards ==
- Julio Tovar Award in Poetry (1967) for Palabra urgente.
- Ciudad de La Laguna Award (1968).
- Antonio de Viana Award for Poetry (1969) for Mísero tiempo.
- Benito Pérez Armas Award (1973) for Tachero.
- Benito Pérez Galdós Award (1979) for Exterminio en Lastenia.
- Planeta Award (1995) for La mirada del otro.
- Ondas Award Nacional de Televisión (1995).
- Antena de Oro (1995) for his work on Telediario Fin de semana.
- Azorín Award (2015) for Sus ojos en mí.
