= Telediario =

Spanish daily television newscast

- Logo since 2021
- Genre: News
- Country of origin: Spain
- Original language: Spanish (along with local languages in some regional bulletins)

Production
- Producer: Televisión Española (RTVE)
- Running time: 60 minutes (3pm/9pm editions); 150 minutes (Telediario Matinal)

Original release
- Network: La 1; 24 Horas; TVE Internacional
- Release: 15 September 1957 – present

Related
- La 2 Noticias

Telediario (Tele-journal) is the flagship television newscast produced by Televisión Española (TVE), the television division of Spanish state-owned public broadcaster Radiotelevisión Española (RTVE). It is the longest running program in the history of television in Spain as it has been broadcast daily since 15 September 1957.

Three Telediario editions a day are produced by Televisión Española news services and are simulcast live on La 1, on 24 Horas news channel, on TVE Internacional and on RTVE Play. Previous editions are also available on their online platform on demand. Additional international editions are also produced and aired on TVE Internacional every day.

TVE's territorial centers in every autonomous community produce and broadcast in regional variations in each of them, a shorter midday local newscast, each one with a different name, following the format and visual identity of Telediario.

== History ==
Televisión Española was established at a building of Paseo de la Habana in Madrid and began its broadcasts on 28 October 1956. Within a week, the news services were created and its initial newscast, named Últimas Noticias, began broadcast; with the weather forecast first airing on 2 November 1956. This initial newscast only lasted until that summer break. On 15 September 1957, the evening edition of Telediario was premiered, with the afternoon edition following on 28 April 1958.

On 14 July 1959, TVE opened its Miramar studios in Barcelona and on 12 February 1964, its production center in the Canary Islands. When Prado del Rey was inaugurated on 18 July 1964 in Pozuelo de Alarcón (Madrid), all entertainment programming (variety, dramas, children's programming, etc.) was soon transferred to the new facilities and the Paseo de la Habana studios was transformed into a dedicated news and current affairs facility, inclusive of studios for Telediario. They were there until they were also transferred to the Prado del Rey complex in 1967 to join the other divisions of TVE.

In August 1966, TVE stationed its first permanent foreign correspondent in London, followed in 1968 by the ones in New York, Vienna and Brussels. On 24 May 1971, the first bureau was opened in Bilbao, followed by the ones in Santiago de Compostela on 25 July 1971 and in Seville on 29 July 1971, which would later become the first territorial centers. In 1975 it started its broadcasts in color.

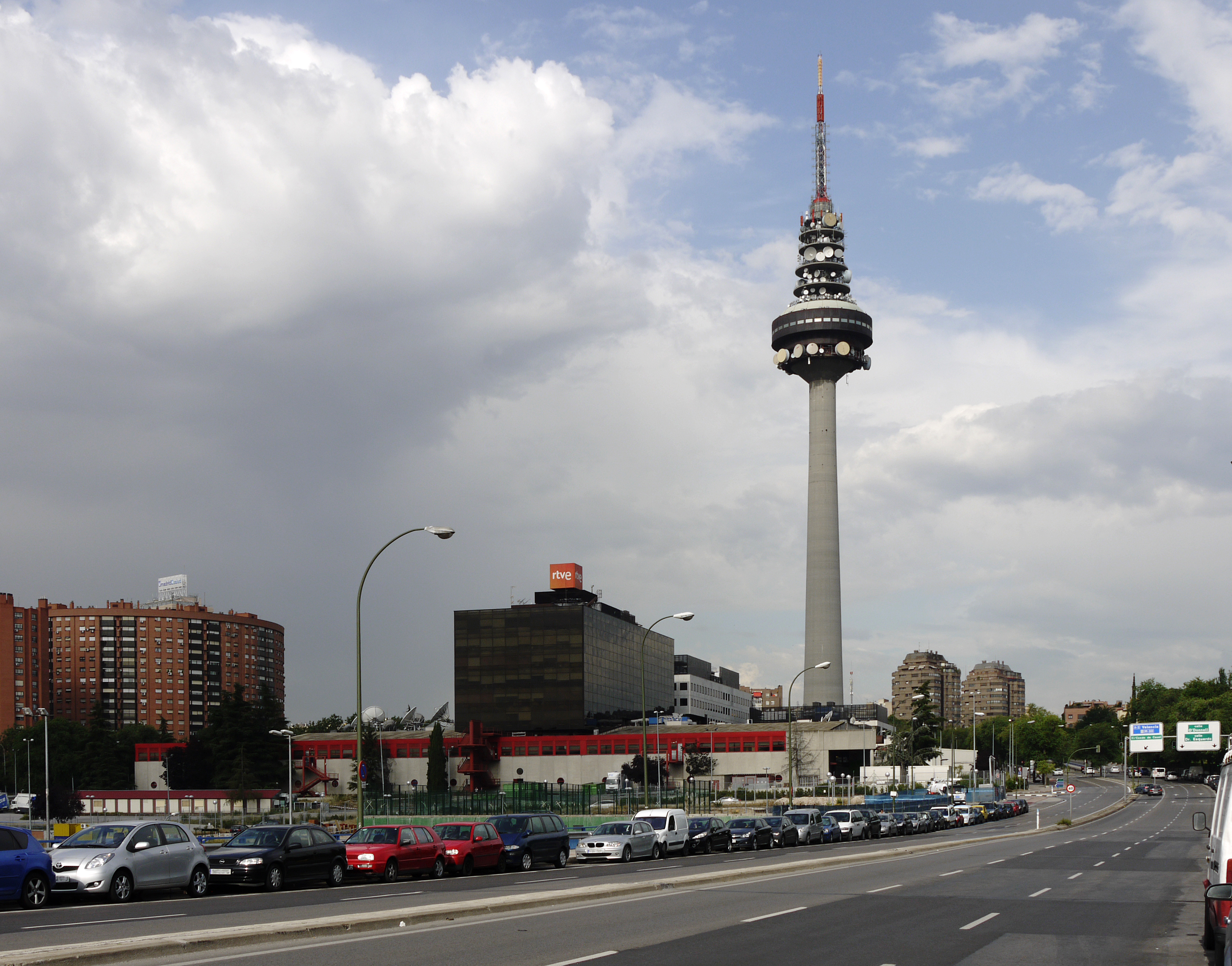
Since 1983, TVE's central news services are located at Torrespaña.

On 13 November 1983, the last live episode of Telediario from the Prado del Rey news center was broadcast, as TVE's central news services were moved to the new Torrespaña studio facilities in Madrid at the foot of the broadcasting tower. On 14 November, Telediario was broadcast from the Torrespaña studios for the first time, and it has been broadcast from there ever since. To celebrate the move, a new CGI intro for the program, featuring the Torrespaña transmitter, premiered in 1984.

On 14 July 1989, it was presented out-of-studio for the first time. It was partially presented live from the Champ de Mars in Paris, with the Eiffel Tower in the background, on the occasion of the celebrations for the bicentennial of the French Revolution. Since then, the main presenters have anchored on location on special occasions or when major stories break.

On 11 September 2001, Telediario 1 began with the breaking live feed of the World Trade Center's North Tower in New York since it had been hit a few minutes before. That edition ran for more than seven hours, making it the longest Telediario news bulletin in its history.

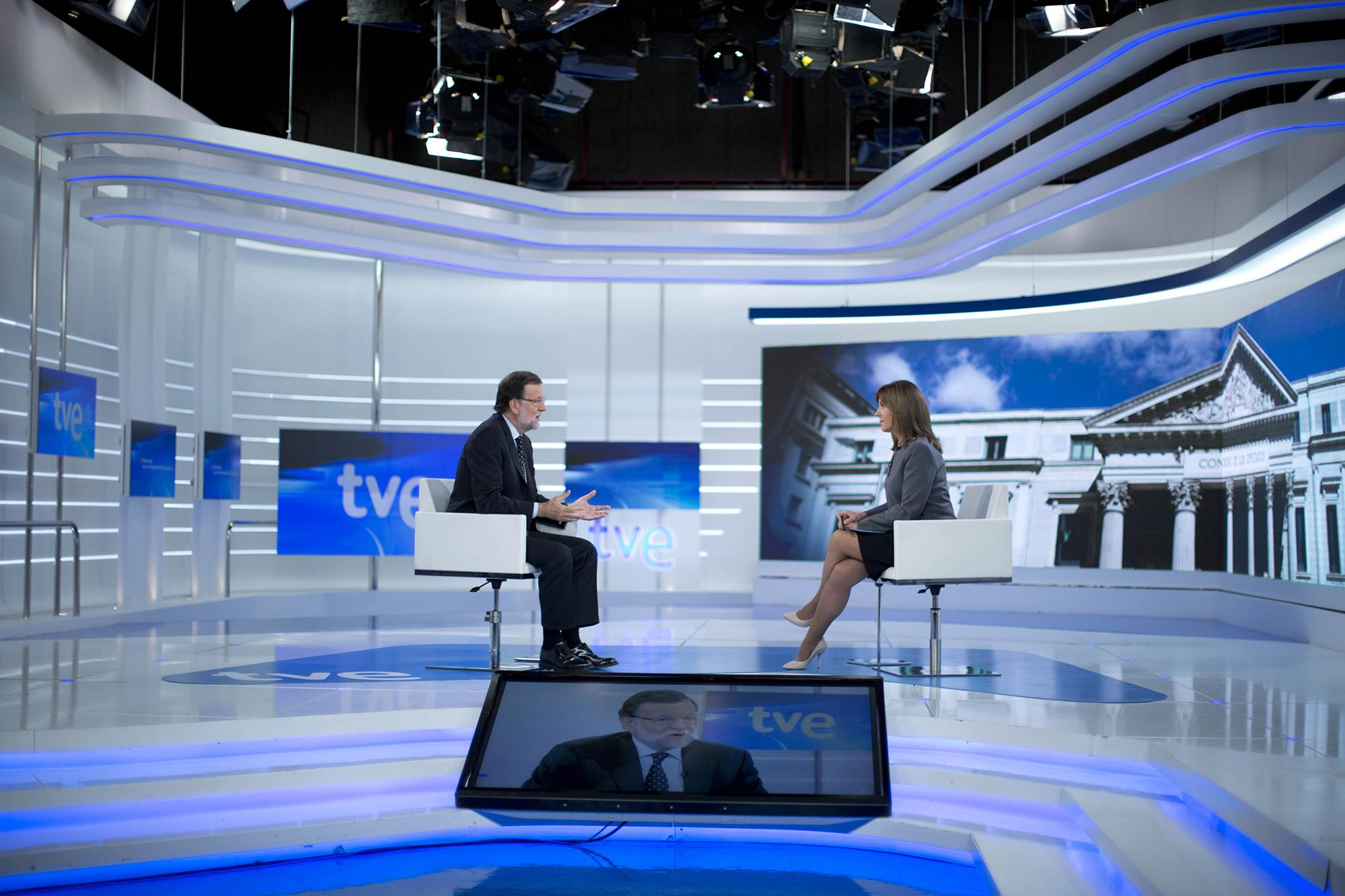
Ana Blanco interviewing Prime Minister Mariano Rajoy in the Telediario set (Note: The set appears without its central table, which was removed for the interview.) on 20 October 2015.

Many presenters and correspondents have worked for Telediario. Letizia Ortiz Rocasolano was an anchor for three years (2000–2003), just until the day before the unexpected announcement of her engagement with then Prince of Asturias Felipe de Borbón. Writer Arturo Pérez-Reverte was a TVE war correspondent for twenty-one years (1973–1994) and chronicled, among others, the Bosnian war. Rosa María Mateo was an anchor for twenty years (1973–1993). Ana Blanco served as anchor for thirty-two years, from 15 September 1990 until she stepped down on 29 August 2022.

In 2019, a plan to transfer TVE's news services and Telediario back to Prado del Rey starting in late 2021 was approved. This plan was eventually halted due to the COVID-19 pandemic and was replaced by another plan to modernize the facilities in Torrespaña.

== Programme format ==
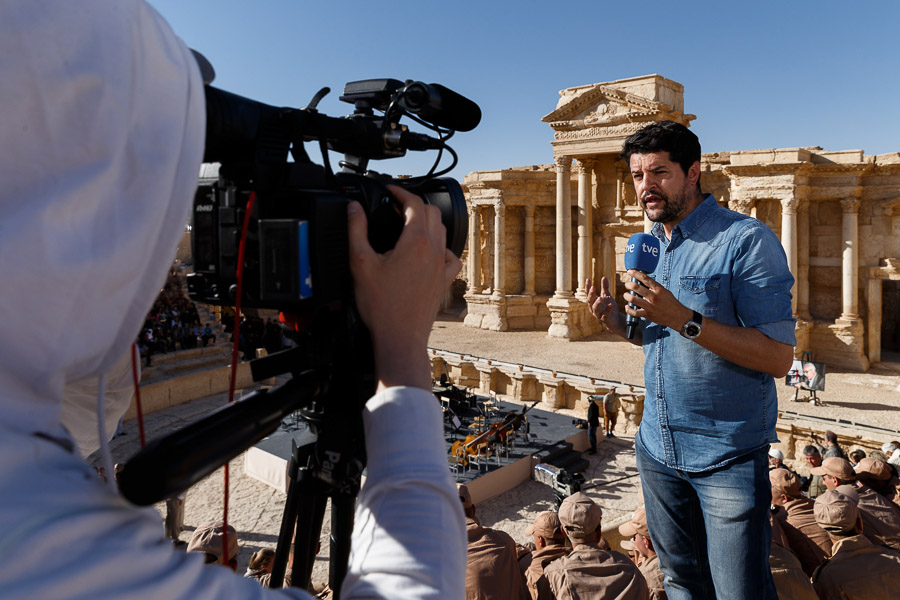
Luis Pérez López reporting from the Roman Theatre at Palmyra, Syria, on 5 May 2016.

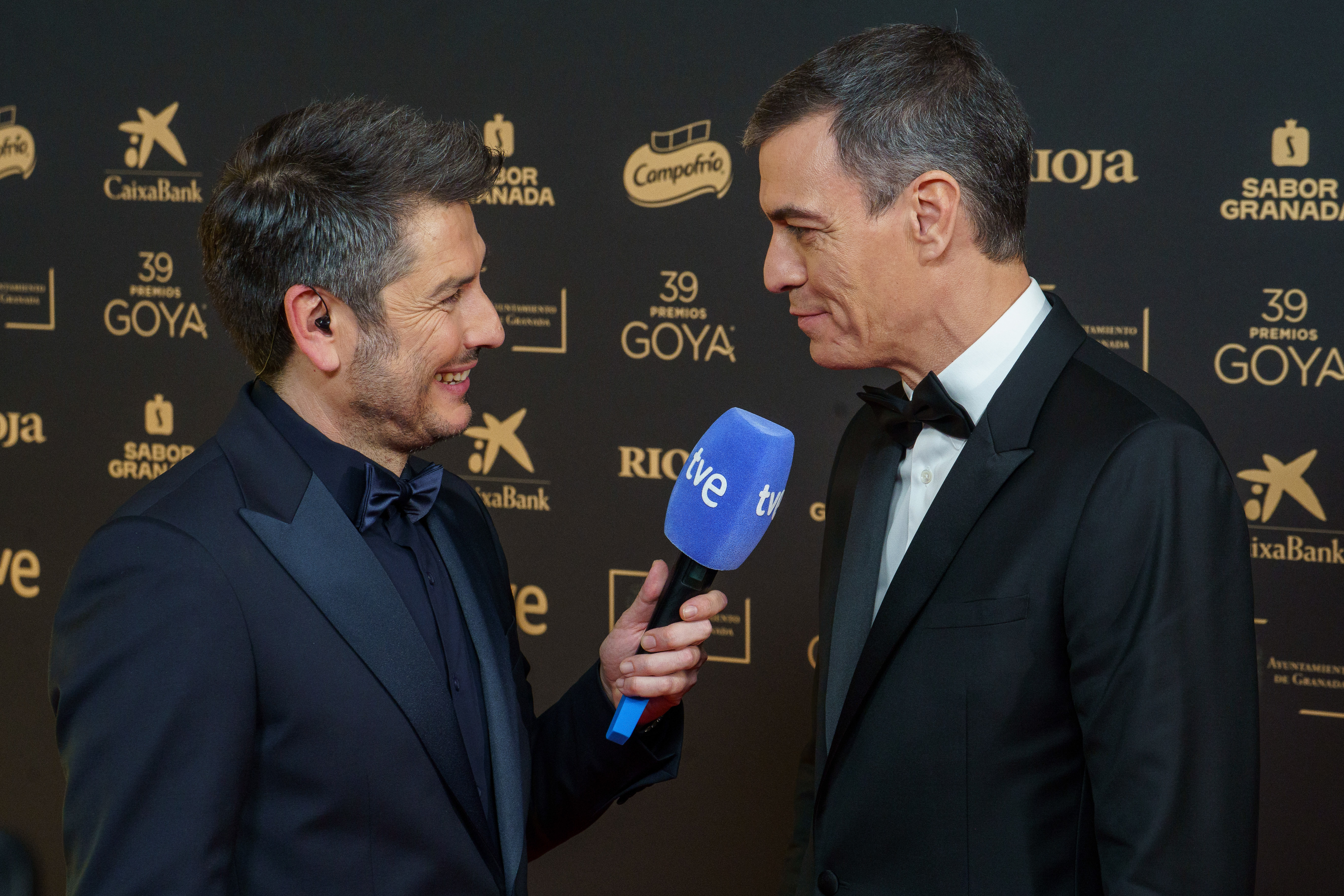
Carlos del Amor interviewing Prime Minister Pedro Sánchez at the 39th Goya Awards on 8 February 2025.

The programme is presented by one or two main newsreaders with an additional sports news presenter. News items are produced, with the footage taken by their own cameramen, by the central newsroom of TVE's news services in Torrespaña, by the newsrooms of TVE's territorial centers across Spain, by TVE's foreign correspondents around the world or by on-the-scene special reporters. All the news feeds are coordinated by TVE's news services' master control room in Torrespaña. Additional footage can be taken from the TVE historical audiovisual archive, from the Eurovision news exchange service or from news agencies. Many items are preceded by the journalist reporting live (Directo) from the scene of the story. The sixty-minute programme is followed by a weather report known as El Tiempo, produced by RTVE's meteorological service with data from the State Meteorological Agency. The entire running time, including El Tiempo, is about seventy minutes.

Álex Barreiro and Lorena Baeza present Telediario Matinal, the breakfast edition consisting of a rolling news service that airs for two hours from 06:30 CET/CEST, with Paula Murillo presenting the sports. Alejandra Herranz presents Telediario 1, the afternoon edition at 15:00, with Ana Ibáñez presenting the sports. Pepa Bueno presents Telediario 2, the flagship evening edition at 21:00, with Lara Gandarillas presenting the sports. Marc Sala and Lourdes Maldonado present Telediario Fin de Semana, the weekend editions at 15:00 and 21:00, with Marcos López presenting the sports. Until February 2010, TVE used to broadcast a late-night edition, named Telediario 3, which was typically aired between midnight and 03:00.

All Telediario editions provide closed captioning, and the 24 Horas news channel simulcast include sign language interpretation during the bulletins.

=== Current editions and presenters ===
Telediario Matinal (Monday to Friday, 06:30 CET/CEST) (Note: Telediario Matinal is not broadcast on public holidays, the Christmas season and from late July to early September.)

Main presenters: Álex Barreiro and Lorena Baeza
Sports presenter: Paula Murillo

Telediario 1 (Monday to Friday, 15:00 CET/CEST)

Main presenter: Alejandra Herranz
Sports presenter: Ana Ibáñez

Telediario 2 (Monday to Friday, 21:00 CET/CEST)

Main presenter: Pepa Bueno
Sports presenter: Lara Gandarillas

Telediario Fin de Semana (Saturday and Sunday, 15:00 and 21:00 CET/CEST)

Main presenters: Marc Sala and Lourdes Maldonado
Sports presenter: Marcos López

=== Former main presenters ===
- Adela Cantalapiedra (1978–1985)
- Alberto Delgado (1971–1983)
- Alfredo Urdaci (1998–2004)
- Almudena Ariza (1990–1991, 1994, 1996–1998)
- Ana Blanco (1990–2022)
- Ana Roldán (2006–2012; currently relief presenter)
- Ana Rosa Quintana (1982–1983)
- Andrés Aberasturi (1988)
- Ángeles Caso (1985–1987)
- Anna Castells (1989–1990)
- Antonio Martín Benítez (1991–1997)
- Baltasar Magro (1983)
- Beatriz Pérez-Aranda (2003)
- Blanca Álvarez (1958–1970)
- Blanca Gala (1968–1969)
- Carlos Herrera (1985)
- Carlos Franganillo (2016–2023)
- Carmen Tomás (2000–2004)
- César Macía (1999–2000)
- Clara Isabel Francia (1975–1977)
- Concha García Campoy (1985–1987)
- Cristina García Ramos (1979–1983)
- David Cantero (2004–2010)
- David Cubedo (1957–1965)
- Eduardo Sancho (1956–1966)
- Eduardo Sotillos (1976–1978, 1995–1996)
- Elena Sánchez (1987–1993, 2004–2006)
- Ernesto Sáenz de Buruaga (1996–1998)
- Felipe Mellizo (1984–1985)
- Fernando González Delgado (1993–1996)
- Florencio Solchaga (1971–1975)
- Francine Gálvez (1990–1991)
- Francisco Lobatón (1985–1987)
- Helena Resano (2003–2006)
- Iñaki Gabilondo (1981)
- Isabel Tenaille (1987)
- Javier Vázquez (1973–1975)
- Jesús Álvarez (1957–1967)
- Jesús Hermida (1990–1991)
- Joaquín Arozamena (1981–1984)
- José Miguel Flores (1978–1979)
- José Ribagorda (1997–2004)
- Josep Maria Balcells (1991–1992)
- Josep Puigbó (2003–2004)
- Julio César Fernández (1968–1970)
- Lalo Azcona (1976–1977)
- Letizia Ortiz (2003)
- Lluís Guilera (2018–2020)
- Lorenzo Milá (2004–2009)
- Luis Carandell (1985–1987)
- Luis de Benito (1987–1988)
- Luis Mariñas (1987–1990)
- Manuel Almendros (1976–1977)
- Manuel Campo Vidal (1983–1987)
- Mari Carmen García Vela (1975–1978, 1981–1983)
- María Casado (2006–2012)
- María José Molina (2000–2004)
- Mari Pau Domínguez (1989–1990)
- María San Juan (1988)
- Marta Carazo (2024–2025)
- Matías Prats Luque (1991–1998)
- Miguel Adrover (1989–1990)
- Montserrat Balfegó (1993–1995)
- Nieves Romero (1976–1977)
- Paco Montesdeoca (1984)
- Pedro Altares (1993–1995)
- Pedro Macía (1973–1980)
- Pedro Meyer (1974–1981)
- Pedro Piqueras (1988–1993)
- Pedro Sánchez Quintana (1996–1999)
- Pepe Navarro (1984)
- Oriol Nolis (2013–2014)
- Ramón Pellicer (1993–1996)
- Ramón Sánchez-Ocaña (1972–1975)
- Ricardo Fernández Deu (1976–1977)
- Rosa María Artal (1983)
- Rosa María Mateo (1973–1993)
- Sandra Sutherland (1994–1997)
- Santiago Vázquez (1961–1973)
- Secundino González (1987)
- Susana Roza (2004–2012)
- Tello Zurro (1978–1985)
- Teresa Castanedo (1988–1989)
- Victoria Prego (1981–1982)

=== Former sports presenters ===
- Desirée Ndjambo (2010-2013)
- Jesús Álvarez Cervantes (1989–2013)
- María Escario (1985–2014)
- Mari Carmen Izquierdo (1979–1983)
- Miguel Ors (1973–1978)
- J. J. Santos (1997–2002)
- Sergio Sauca (1990–2020)
- Miguel Vila (1975–1979)
- Olga Viza (1987–1992)

=== Reporters and correspondents ===
- Almudena Ariza (2000–present)
- Álvaro López de Goicoechea (2008–present)
- Ángela Rodicio (1989–2003)
- Anna Bosch (1998–present)
- Antonio Parreño (2005–present)
- Arturo Pérez-Reverte (1985–1994)
- Carlos Franganillo (2008–2016)
- Diego Carcedo (1977–1988)
- Jesús Hermida (1967–1978)
- Julio Bernárdez García (1990–1996)
- Luis de Benito (1994–2008)
- Lorenzo Milá (2003 2004 2009, −2014 )
- Miguel Angel García Rodríguez (2007–present)
- Miguel Ángel Idigoras (2013–present)
- María Serén (2013–present)
- Marisa Rodríguez Palop (2014–2019)
- Paloma Gómez Borrero (1978–1983)
- Pedro Erquicia (1978–1984)
- Rosa María Calaf (1983–2009)
- Rosa María Molló (2003–2011)
- Sagrario Ruiz de Apodaca (2002–2003)
- Sagrario García Masacaraque (2014–present)
- María Oña (2014–2016)
- Marcos López (2016–2019)
- Nuria Ramos (2015–present)
- Vicenç Sanclemente (2015–present)
- Érika Reija (2015–present)
- Sandra Urdín (2014–2015)
- Íñigo Herráiz (2015–present)
- Yolanda Álvarez (2011–2015)
- Óscar Mijallo (2015–present)
- José Ramón Patterson (2015–present)
- Cristina Olea (2018–present)

=== Weather forecasters ===
- Mariano Medina (1957–1980)
- Manuel Toharia (1970–1980)
- Eugenio Martín Rubio (1968–1982)
- Pilar Sanjurjo (1979–1985)
- José Antonio Maldonado (1986–2008)
- Charo Pascual (1988–1990)
- Paco Montesdeoca (1990–2007)
- Albert Barniol (2005–present)
- José Miguel Gallardo (2008–present)
- Mònica López (2008–2020)
- Martín Barreiro (2010–present)

== Audiences ==
The 21:00 edition is broadcast head to head with the programme Antena 3 Noticias on former rival commercial network Antena 3. As of 2010, Telediario wins a larger audience share than Antena 3 Noticias. Since the removal of ads from TVE on 1 January 2010, Telediario lasts for more than sixty minutes, with El Tiempo adding about ten minutes more after it, and its audience continued to grow even more.

== Territorial news bulletins ==
TVE's territorial centers in every autonomous community produce and broadcast in regional variations in each of them, a shorter midday local newscast, each one with a different name, following the format and visual identity of Telediario.

Region	Name	Since	Language
Andalusia	Noticias de Andalucía	1970	Spanish
Aragon	Noticias Aragón	1979	Spanish
Asturias	Panorama Regional	1974	Spanish
Balearic Islands	Informatiu Balear	1979	Catalan
Basque Country	Telenorte	1971	Spanish
Basque Country	Gaurkoak (Note: Gaurkoak is broadcast at the end of the news bulletin.)	1971	Basque
Canary Islands	Telecanarias	1971	Spanish
Cantabria	Telecantabria	1984	Spanish
Castile–La Mancha	Noticias de Castilla–La Mancha	1989	Spanish
Castile and Leon	Noticias de Castilla y León	1982	Spanish
Catalonia	L'informatiu	1977	Catalan
Ceuta	Noticias de Ceuta	1987	Spanish
Extremadura	Noticias de Extremadura	1989	Spanish
Galicia	Telexornal	1971	Galician
La Rioja	Informativo Telerioja	1986	Spanish
Madrid	Informativo de Madrid	1974	Spanish
Melilla	Noticias de Melilla	1987	Spanish
Murcia	Noticias Murcia	1982	Spanish
Navarre	Telenavarra	1981	Spanish
Navarre	Arin Arin (Note: Arin Arin is broadcast at the end of the news bulletin.)	1981	Basque
Valencian Community	L'informatiu – Comunitat Valenciana	1971	Valencian (Note: Although the news bulletin is mainly in Valencian, some news items have a Spanish voice-over and the texts onscreen are written in Spanish.)

== Legacy ==
=== In popular culture ===
The term Telediario in Spain has become synonymous with television news, with people saying 'put on the Telediario' when simply referring to news. "Le quedan dos telediarios" (he's got two news programmes left) is a common colloquial Spanish expression to suggest someone's days are numbered, either literally (about to die) or metaphorically (about to be removed from a position of responsibility).

=== In Equatorial Guinea ===
On 20 July 1968, Televisión Española inaugurated its territorial center in the Spanish autonomous region of Equatorial Guinea at Santa Isabel and began the first regular television broadcasts in the region. After Equatorial Guinea declared independence on 12 October 1968, the new authorities accused them of broadcasting "racist programming" and "imperialist propaganda", and TVE ended up closing the station. Shortly after they resumed their broadcasts as Televisión Nacional de Guinea Ecuatorial (TVGE) but they ceased broadcasting definitively in 1973 and the few remaining Spanish technicians left the country. The Equatoguinean government re-established TVGE in 1979. RTVE and the Government of Spain through development aid have helped to the development of the station on several occasions since then. TVGE's news bulletins are branded under the name Telediario.

== See also ==
- Los Desayunos de TVE
- Informe Semanal
- Antena 3 Noticias
- Informativos Telecinco
- La Sexta Noticias
