= Paloma Gómez Borrero =

Spanish journalist and writer

The Most Excellent Paloma Gómez Borrero OIC
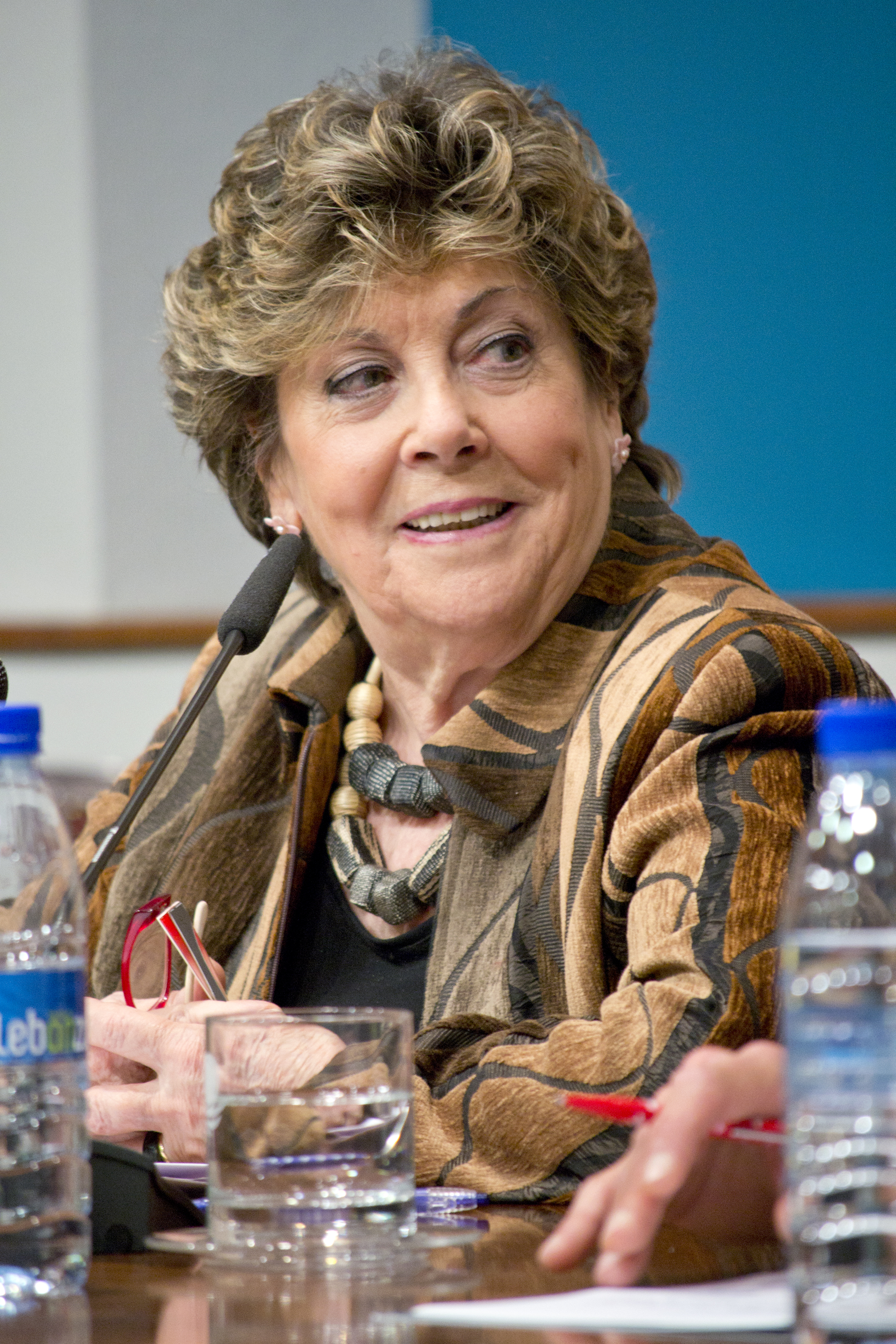
- Gómez Borrero in 2011
- Born: María Paloma Gómez Borrero; 18 August 1934; Madrid, Spain
- Died: 24 March 2017 (aged 82); Madrid, Spain
- Education: Official School of Journalism
- Occupations: Journalist, writer
- Employers: Televisión Española; COPE; 13TV
- Spouse: Alberto de Marchís
- Awards: Order of Isabella the Catholic (1999); Gold Medal of Merit in Labour (2017)

María Paloma Gómez Borrero (18 August 1934 – 24 March 2017) was a Spanish journalist and writer. In 1976, she became the second female television foreign correspondents from Spain, when appointed correspondent in Italy and the Vatican for Televisión Española (TVE).

Gómez Borrero received the Iris Lifetime Achievement Award presented by the Spanish Television Academy in 2016.

== Biography ==
Gómez Borrero was a descendant, by maternal line, of Juan Álvarez Mendizábal. Her maternal grandfather, General Borrero, had a prominent role with the Isabelino troops during the Carlist Wars. She began her studies at the Deutsche Schule Madrid, and during the summers she had the opportunity to visit France, the United Kingdom, and Germany, thanks to a scholarship program. She continued her studies at the Colegio del Sagrado Corazón on Madrid's Caballero de Gracia Street, graduated from the Official School of Journalism, and worked as a special correspondent for the weekly Sábado Gráfico in Germany, Austria, and the United Kingdom. She spoke five languages.

In December 1976, she was appointed foreign correspondent of Televisión Española (TVE) in Italy and the Vatican, being the second female television foreign correspondents from the country. (Note: The first television foreign correspondent from Spain was Ana Isabel Cano, TVE correspondent in Vienna, appointed in 1968.) Gómez Borrero was dismissed from office in 1983 by personal decision of the then director of RTVE, José María Calviño.

Later she contributed to many of the magazine series that María Teresa Campos hosted: Pasa la vida (1991–1996) on TVE, Día a día (1996–2004) on Telecinco, and Cada día (2004–2005) on Antena 3. She was also a correspondent of Venevisión (Venezuela) and Noticiero TV Hoy (Colombia). From August 2007 to 2012 she wrote for the Telecinco program La noria, presented by Jordi González.

Until June 2012, she was a correspondent for the COPE network in Rome and the Vatican, commenting from there on the religious events of the Catholic Church broadcast on Cadena COPE and Popular TV. In 2012 she contributed to the Ventana al mundo radio program for Latin America and the US, from Italy and the Vatican, and was a correspondent in Italy for esRadio.

On 15 August 2013, Gómez Borrero planted and nurtured a tree with her name in the Communication Park of Boiro, the only one in Spain created by journalists.

She studied palmistry applied to psychology.

She was a proclaimer of Holy Week in Medina de Rioseco in 1992, in Valladolid in 2000, and in Cuenca in 2014.

On 12 October 2014 she premiered the recital Una Castellana Vieja y Recia de nombre Teresa in Toledo, along with the baritone Luis Santana and the pianist Antonio López. It portrayed the acts of the 5th Centennial of Saint Teresa of Ávila, running throughout the Teresian Year for more than seventy performances related to the poet. The concert was based on music composed by Francisco Palazón, Ángel Barja, Amadeu Vives, Juan del Encina, Federico Mompou, and Ernesto Monsalve.

Gómez Borrero wrote for numerous Spanish media outlets such as TVE, Telemadrid, 13TV, ABC's Alfa y Omega, and COPE. She had extensive knowledge of the Holy See, and accompanied Pope John Paul II on his 104 trips (five of them to Spain) visiting 160 countries, some 29 times around the world in kilometers traveled.

In November 2016, during the presentation of the Iris Awards, she explained: "The first trip I made was with Paul VI and the last thing I did was the closing of the Holy Door with Pope Francis. I am still in the breach". She also thanked Italy for the prize, "who has been very generous with her," and her family: "they have been my support and much of what I am in this profession I owe to the holy patience of my husband and my children. For times that I have left them eating at the table to go to send a chronicle."

Paloma Gómez Borrero died on 24 March 2017 at age 82 due to liver cancer, which had been diagnosed a few weeks earlier.

== Books ==
- Huracán Wojtyla
- Abuela, háblame del Papa
- Juan Pablo, amigo
- Adiós, Juan Pablo, amigo
- Dos Papas, una familia
- La Alegría
- A vista de Paloma
- Caminando por Roma
- Los fantasmas de Roma
- Los fantasmas de Italia
- Una guía del viajero para el jubileo
- De Benedicto a Francisco. El cónclave del cambio
- El Libro de la pasta
- Pasta, pizza y mucho más
- Comiendo con Paloma Gómez Borrero
- Cocina sin sal o Nutrición infantil

== Awards ==
- European Prize of the City Council of Rome (1974)
- Professionalism Prize awarded for coverage of the Papal conclave and for information on the murder of Aldo Moro (1978)
- Calabria Prize, awarded by the President of the Republic to a foreign correspondent in Italy (1980)
- Adelaide Ristori Award to twelve outstanding women in their respective professions (1991)
- Feather of Peace Award from the Mensajeros de la Paz (1991)
- Llama Rotaria 97 Award from the Rotary Club of Valencia (1997)
- Rodríguez Santamaría Prize of the Madrid Press Association (2001)
- Silver Cross of the Spanish Association of European Development (2002)
- Special Bravo Award for exemplary lifetime career, granted by the Episcopal Conference (2010)
- Lifetime Achievement Iris Award, granted by the Spanish Television Academy (2016)

== Honours ==
- Officer's Cross of the Order of Isabella the Catholic (Kingdom of Spain, 12 July 1999).
- Dame of the Order of St. Gregory the Great, granted by Pope John Paul II (Vatican, 13 July 2002)
- Gold Medal of Merit in Labour (Kingdom of Spain, 2017 posthumous).
