= María Casado (journalist) =

Spanish television presenter

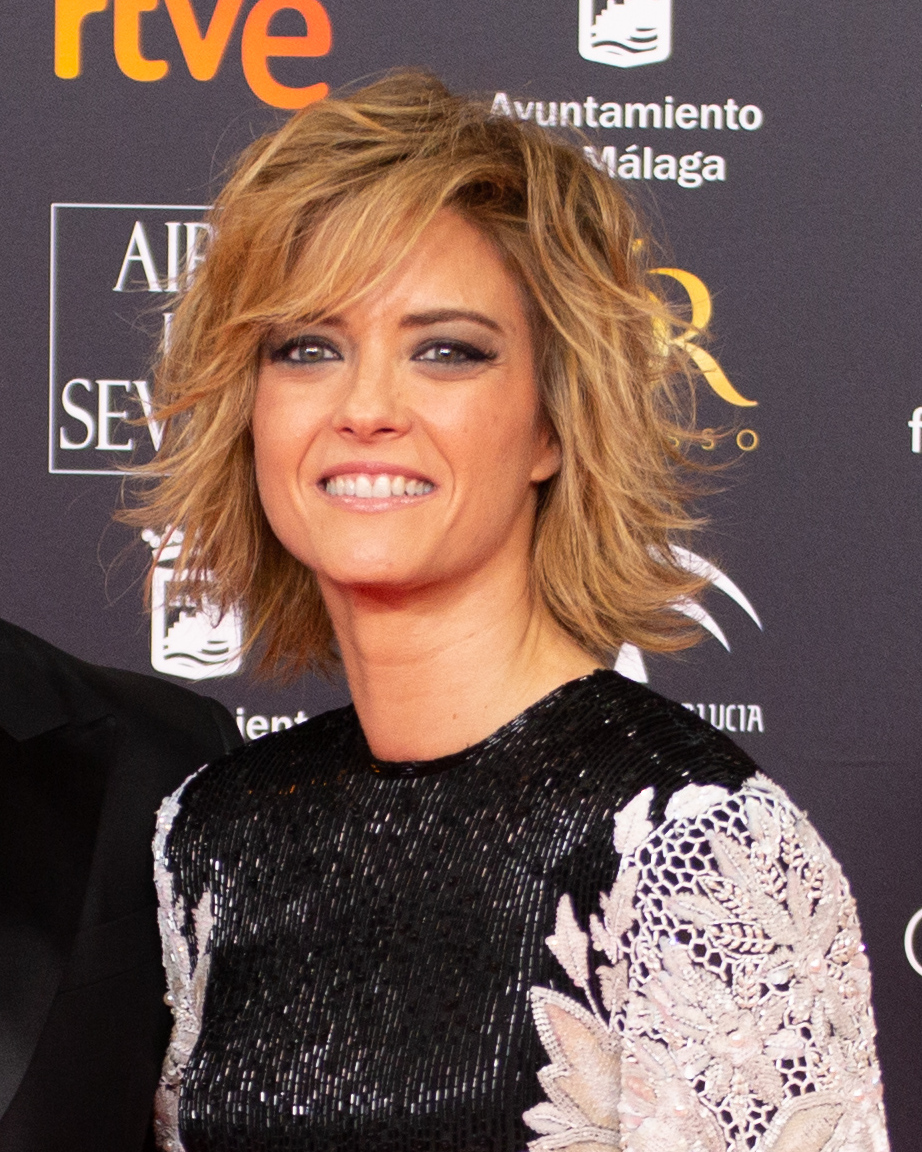
- María Casado during the 34th Goya Awards in 2020
- Born: María Casado Paredes; 14 March 1978 (age 48); Barcelona, Spain
- Occupations: Television presenter, journalist
- Years active: 1999–present
- Employer(s): RNE, Catalunya Ràdio, TVE, Soho TV

María Casado Paredes (born 14 March 1978) is a Spanish journalist and presenter. She is known for her longstanding involvement in the newscast department of Televisión Española (TVE) from 2005 to 2020.

== Biography ==
Born in Barcelona on 14 March 1978. After earning a licentiate degree in journalism from the University of Barcelona, she started working for the public radio broadcaster Radio Nacional de España (RNE) in 1999, as editor in Ràdio 4. After a brief spell in the Catalan public radio broadcaster Catalunya Ràdio as producer of El matí, she returned to RNE in 2003.

She entered TVE's newscast service in 2005. She became the anchor of the weekend edition of the Telediario in 2006 and co-hosted Informe Semanal from 2007 to 2009. She joined the political debate program 59 segundos in 2009 (she had already hosted its Catalan-language equivalent 59 segons in the TV blocks of the Spanish public broadcaster in Catalonia). After the latter Globomedia-produced program was axed because of its costs in 2012, Casado briefly continued as host of its successor El debate de La 1, as she soon became the presenter of the breakfast television news program Los Desayunos de TVE in that year, replacing Ana Pastor. She left Los Desayunos in 2016 to replace Mariló Montero as host of the morning television show La Mañana. She became the chairwoman of the Spain's Academy of Television and Audiovisual Arts and Sciences in 2018. In 2020, after 4 years hosting La Mañana, she was replaced by the meteorologist Mònica López as presenter of the show, which was renamed as La Hora de La 1. She subsequently left TVE and joined Antonio Banderas' Málaga-based production company Soho TV.

In 2020, Casado was the presenter on the Banderas-directed music web television series Escena en blanco y negro, released on Amazon Prime Video. On 6 March 2021, Casado and Banderas directed and hosted the 35th Goya Awards ceremony.

Her return to TVE was announced in October 2021, set the host a weekly show produced in Sant Cugat del Vallès.

Between 2022 and 2023, she returned to TVE with the interview program Las tres puertas, produced by Teatro Soho Televisión; its first season aired on La 1 and the second on La 2. During its first season, the show received two nominations at the 2022 Iris Awards from the Academy of Television for Best Program and Best Presenter, with María Casado winning the latter award for her work hosting the program.

On September 11, 2024, she joined the newsroom of Informativos Telecinco, and on September 21 of the same year, she became co-presenter and editor of the weekend editions alongside David Cantero. This reunited the two professionals 14 years later, after having previously co-presented TVE's Telediario Fin de Semana together for four years. Her move to Mediaset marked her departure as director of Teatro Soho TV, leading her to reside in Torremolinos (Málaga) from Monday to Wednesday, and in Madrid from Thursday to Sunday to prepare and present the weekend newscasts.
