= María Teresa Campos =

Spanish journalist and television presenter (1941–2023)

The Most Excellent María Teresa Campos
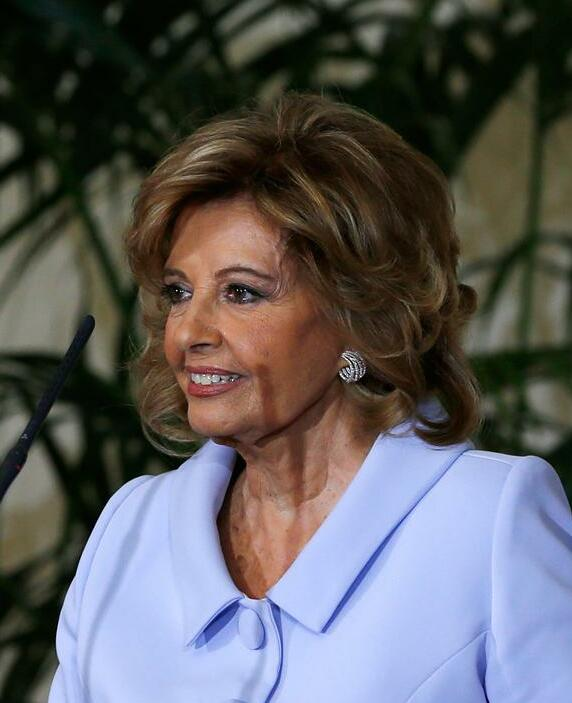
- Campos in 2017
- Born: María Teresa Campos Luque; 18 June 1941; Tétouan, Spanish Morocco
- Died: 5 September 2023 (aged 82); Madrid, Spain
- Occupations: Journalist; television presenter
- Spouse: José María Borrego Doblas (m. 1964; died 1984)
- Children: Terelu Campos; Carmen Borrego

María Teresa Campos Luque (18 June 1941 – 5 September 2023) was a Spanish journalist, radio and television presenter with a long professional career spanning over five decades. She was considered a pioneer of Spanish journalism, and received numerous accolades throughout her career, including a Lifetime Achievement Award from Spanish Television Academy in 2013.

During her extensive journalistic career, Campos received high levels of success with her programs. This made her one of the best-known and most-appreciated communicators in Spain.

== Early life ==
María Teresa Campos was born in Tétouan, then in the Spanish protectorate in Morocco, on 18 June 1941. She was the third of six children of an upper-middle-class family; her parents were Tomás Campos and Concepción Luque. In 1942 the family moved from Tétouan, where her father ran a pharmaceutical laboratory, to Málaga. There, she had a traditional Catholic education, finishing high school at the Teresian School in Málaga.

Campos' brother Francisco founded Radio Juventud Málaga in 1954, a radio station belonging to the youth section of FET-JONS. Radio Juventud became the reference radio station in Malaga until the 1970s. In 1956 María Teresa was part of the audience of a program at the station when she participated in a recitation contest. When she passed the contest, she caught the attention of the head of broadcasting, who hired her on 23 September 1957 after she passed an additional test. Campos was 16 years old and her first program was "Mary Tere y sus amigas".

At the age of 32, Campos began to study philosophy at the University of Málaga and drama at the Conservatory of Málaga. At the same time, she continued working in Radio Juventud in the program "Discos dedicados" and added other radio magazines.

== Career ==
=== 1960s to early 1980s: career in Málaga ===
At Radio Juventud, Campos had a fruitful career, presenting music programs such as "Discos dedicados" or film programs such as "Panorámica", as well as re-transmissions of Holy Week, bullfighting, or even politics and feminism, such as the innovative "Mujer76". She soon became a regular presence on Malaga radio, together with her radio partner Diego Gómez, with whom she presented the program "Mary Tere y Diego", which aired in 1964.

In 1967 María Teresa Campos joined Radio Popular in Málaga with the pop music program "Español Pop". Campos returned to Radio Juventud's news programs in 1973. In those years she delivered news, music, and magazine programs. In the last years of Franco's regime, she had to circumvent censorship restrictions and began to express her feminist and progressivist positions. She and her husband received ideologically motivated threats during those years, including an incident in which her car was burned in front of her home.

Studying at the University of Málaga allowed her to learn about the student movements of the last years of the dictatorship, which led her to give it an informative voice on the radio alongside Rafael Rodriguez. In 1977 Campos participated in the broadcasting by Radio Juventud of the demonstration of 4 December, in which Andalusians, already in the early years of the democratic transition, demanded autonomy for Andalusia. The role of Radio Juventud during the Spanish transition to democracy, which at its origins was a pro-Franco propaganda station, was considered by journalist Juan Tomás Luengo as a "bastion of the defense of freedoms, mainly of information and plural opinion".

In 1977, Campos ran unsuccessfully in the first free general elections for the Spanish Social Reform party as a candidate for the Congress of Deputies because, as she herself said, "knowing from my profession the problems of rural women, I know that its program offers the most appropriate solutions", making an "urgent appeal to all women, from the housewife who exercises a function of great social contribution to that other one who tries to integrate professionally in a society made by men".

In 1980 Campos was appointed News Director of Radio Cadena Española in Andalusia, becoming the first woman to do so. That year Campos won her first Premios Ondas.

The coup attempt of 23 February 1981 happened when Campos was in Málaga, forcing her to hide at her brother's house for fear of being arrested if the coup succeeded. She read the manifesto against the coup in Parque de Málaga.

=== 1980s: Leap to national radio in Madrid and first television jobs ===
In 1981 Campos moved to Madrid, where she started co-hosting the television program "Esta noche", together with Carmen Maura, and "Estudio Directo", with Marisa Abad, as well as collaborating in other programs such as "La tarde" and "Diario de sesiones". Campos directed the program "Apueste por una" in Radio Nacional de España.

In 1986 the television network gave Campos the opportunity to collaborate in the mornings with Jesús Hermida on the program "Por la mañana". Given the responsibility for leading some segments of the program, it was an important boost to her professional career. Campos left Hermida's program in 1989, when she was hired by Iñaki Gabilondo as assistant director of the radio program Hoy por hoy on Cadena SER.

=== 1990s: María Teresa Campos, the "queen of the mornings" ===
Campos returned to television in 1990, replacing Hermida on his program "A mi manera", changing its name shortly thereafter to "Esta es su casa" and later "Pasa la vida". In 1993 she became the "queen of the mornings" after achieving a boom in viewership with the audience of that program.

Telecinco offered Campos a contract in the millions to host the program "Día a día", which became her great television success and was on the air until 2004.

In 1998 Campos presented "Mesa del debate", a morning program where current affairs were debated. This was also the decade when her daughters Terelu Campos and Carmen Borrego entered the world of television.

=== 2000s: temporary retirement, return to television and later years ===
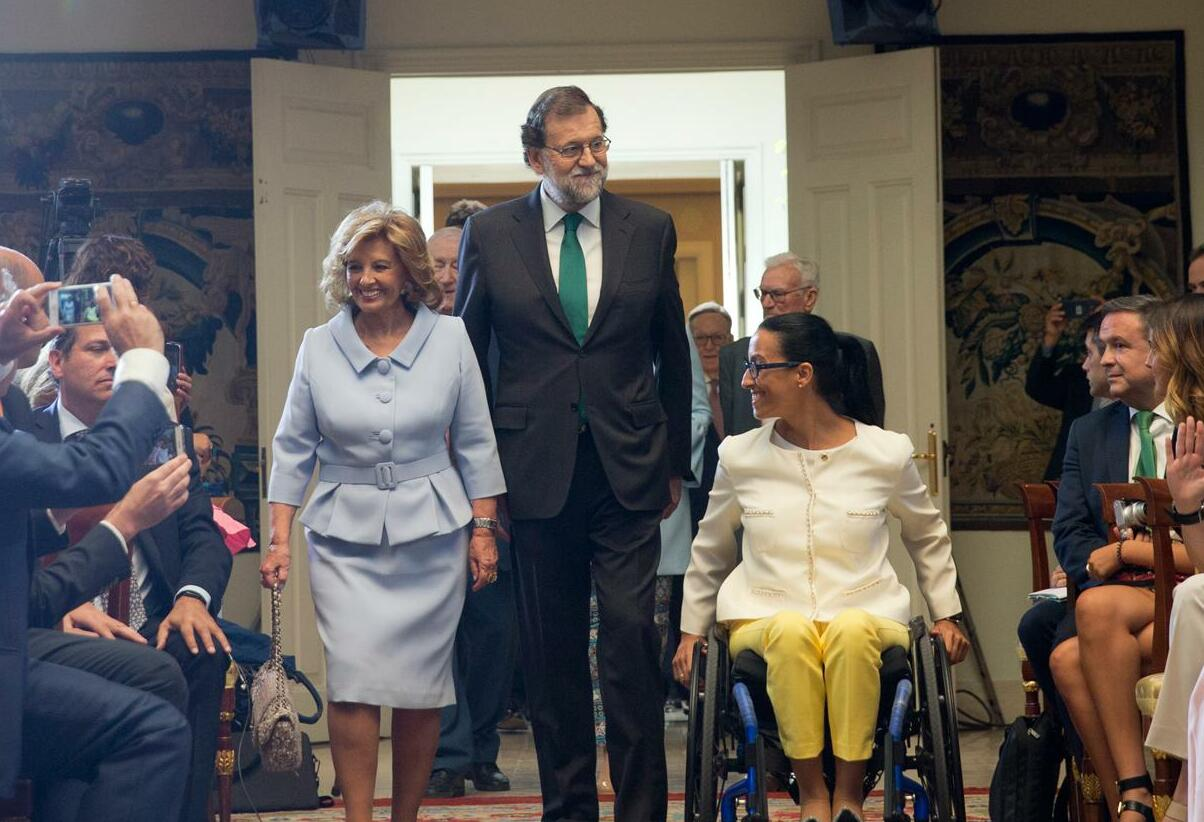
Maria Teresa Campos with Prime Minister Mariano Rajoy in her delivery of the Gold Medal for Merit at Work in 2017

In 2004, Telecinco hired Campos to present the program "Cada día", but the following year it was cancelled for audience reasons. Following this cancellation, Campos decided to temporarily retire from broadcasting.

In 2007 Campos reappeared on Punto Radio to replace Julia Otero on "Protagonistas" for a season. Three years later she returned to Telecinco to present "¡Qué tiempo tan feliz!", a program that lasted until 2017. Between 2010 and 2017, Campos appeared once a week on the program "Sálvame diario" and, in 2011, Campos co-hosted the music contest "Nacidas para cantar" alongside Rocío Carrasco on Canal Sur.

In 2016 Campos starred in a docu-reality show with her daughters entitled "Las Campos".

"La Campos móvil" was the final work in her professional career, which began airing in January 2021 but was canceled after the first broadcast; Campos later lamented that this cancellation led her to retire for good, as advised by her daughters.

== Personal life, health and death ==
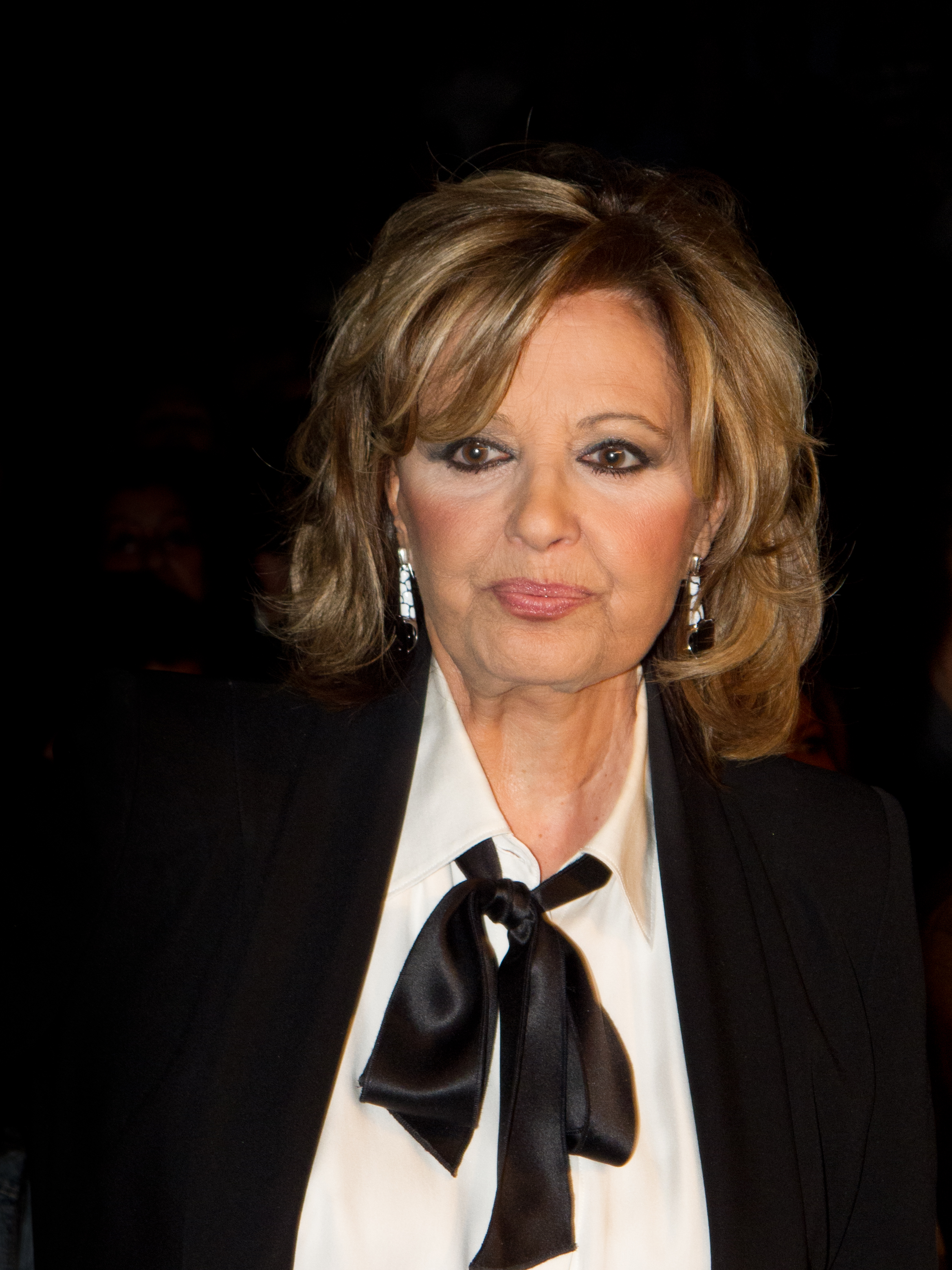
María Teresa Campos in 2012

Campos met journalist José María Borrego at Radio Juventud, with whom she began a formal relationship when she was 16 and Borrego was 22. They married on 12 September 1964 at the Málaga Cathedral. They had two daughters: Terelu (born in 1965), who developed a career as a television presenter and Carmen Borrego (born in 1967), who directed television programs. Campos' move for work reasons in 1981 was the reason why the couple decided to separate, because, as Campos said years later, the marriage "was already over". In 1984, Borrego died by suicide after shooting himself.

Campos had three grandchildren and a great-grandson, who was born in June 2023. She was a fervent follower of Holy Week in Málaga.

In 1987, she met the Basque architect Félix Arechavaleta, her partner of 12 years. In 2014 she met the Chilean-Argentine humorist Bigote Arrocet, beginning a relationship that lasted until 2019 after his infidelity was discovered.

In 2008, Campos battled throat cancer, from which she recovered. On 15 May 2017, Campos was admitted to the Hospital La Luz in Madrid after being unwell and was diagnosed with a stroke. Nine days later she was discharged from the hospital after recovering, although she was left with effects such as tinnitus and a later cognitive decline, a state of deterioration that her daughter Terelu acknowledged publicly in June 2023.

On 3 September 2023, Campos was admitted to the Fundación Jiménez Díaz medical center in Madrid in very serious condition, due to acute respiratory failure. She died on 5 September 2023, at the age of 82. Her death was widely mourned by the Spanish entertainment world, as well as the political class and the Spanish Royal House. The next day she was cremated after Mass at the La Paz Mortuary in Madrid, with plans for her ashes moved to Málaga.

== Selected books ==
- Cómo librarse de los hijos antes de que sea demasiado tarde (1993)
- ¡Qué hombres! Así son y así nos gustaría que fueran (1994)
- Agobios nos da la vida (1997)
- Mis dos vidas (2004)
- Historias de mi tele (2009)
- Princesa Letizia. Por fin reina (2012)
- Amar, ¿para qué?(2014)

== Selected works on television ==
- V Festival Nacional de Villancicos Nuevos (1971)
- La tarde (1985)
- Por la mañana (1986)
- A mi manera (1990)
- Pasa la vida (1990)
- Tardes con Teresa (1995)
- Día a día (1996)
- Cada día (2004)
- El laberinto de la memoria (2008)
- La mirada crítica (2008)
- ¡Qué tiempo tan feliz! (2009)
- La Campos Móvil (2021)

== Accolades ==
=== Awards ===
- Premio Ondas, "Premio Nacional de Radio", 1980 and "Mejor Labor Profesional", 2002
- Antena de Oro 1994, 2000 and 2015
- TP de Oro 1999 and 2004
- Premio Clara Campoamor 2007
- Micrófono de Oro, 2003
- Premio Iris, "Toda una Vida", 2012
- Andalusia Journalism Award, 2022

=== Honours ===
- Medal of Andalusia (Regional Government of Andalusia, 21 February 2000).
- Gold Medal of Merit in Labour (Kingdom of Spain, 12 June 2017).
- Gold Medal of Merit in the Fine Arts (Kingdom of Spain, 27 November 2024)
