= Mònica López =

Spanish scientist and journalist (born 1975)

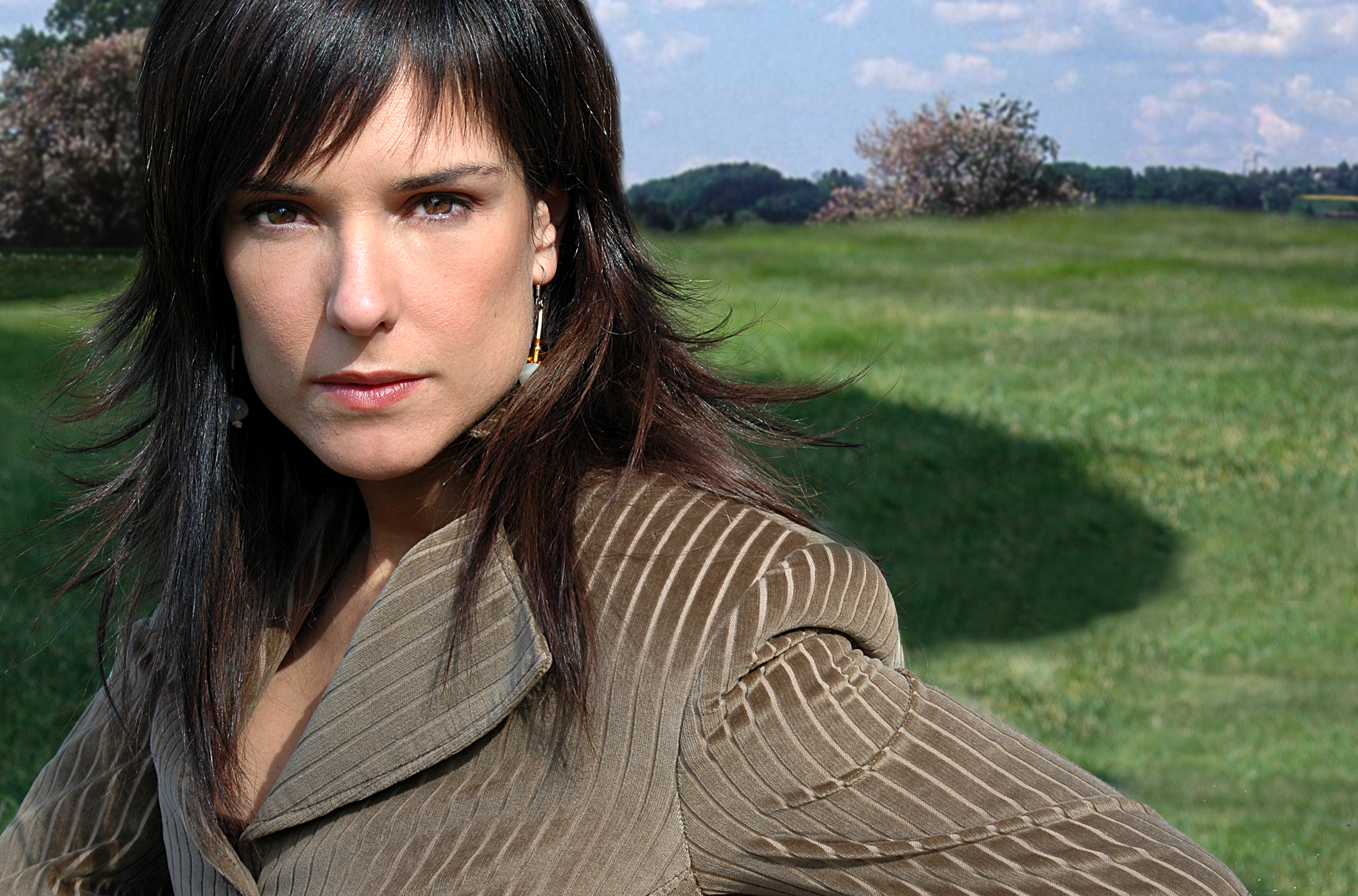
- Born: Mònica López Moyano; 10 January 1975 (age 51); La Seu d'Urgell, Spain
- Education: Open University of Catalonia
- Occupations: Meteorologist, TV presenter, journalist
- Years active: 2008–present
- Employers: RTVE (2008–present); CCMA (2001–2008); Activa Multimedia (1997–2001)
- Television: El Tiempo 2 (2008–2012; 2013–present); El Tiempo 1 (2012–2013); Aquí la Tierra (2015; alternate)
- Awards: Ondas Award (2016)

Mònica López Moyano (born 10 January 1975) is a Spanish meteorologist and television presenter. She is a weather forecaster on Televisión Española's Telediario 2 and director of the meteorology area of RTVE. She has also been the presenter of the TVE1 program La Hora de la 1 since September 2020.

== Biography ==
Mònica López graduated with a licentiate in Physics of the Earth and the Cosmos in 1997 from the University of Barcelona. She also holds a master's degree in political analysis and a university specialization course in Corporate Communication and Branding from the Open University of Catalonia, both completed in 2016.

After finishing her studies in physics, she joined the SAM, the first Spanish company dedicated to meteorological information. She debuted on television on the show Teletiempo on Vía Digital, and later on Canal Satélite Digital's Canal Meteo.

After passing through Channel 33, López became part of the TV3 meteorology team where, from 23 April 2004 to 27 June 2008, she was a meteorologist for the morning program Els matins. She also presented the 2006–2007 New Year's countdown on TV3. Since 2005 she has written a section on meteorological phenomena for the outreach magazine NAT.

On 1 July 2008, she joined RTVE to be the director of its meteorology department and weather presenter on TVE's Telediario 2, replacing José Antonio Maldonado. Since then she has been absent on two occasions due to maternity: the first from 11 February 2010 to 30 August 2010, and the second from 13 October 2011 to 9 January 2012. In the 2012–2013 season she went on to present the weather on Telediario 1, but the following season she returned to Telediario 2.

On 3 December 2012, the Association of Meteorology Communicators (ACOMET), was publicly presented, with the basic objective of improving the meteorological information and dissemination that is done in Spain through various media. Mònica López is a co-founder and president of the board of directors. As a member of ACOMET she has participated in the updating of the Manual de Uso de Términos Meteorológicos, which had initially been published in 1992.

Together with the Agencia Estatal de Meteorología (AEMET), she carried out a project in collaboration with the World Meteorological Organization within the field of communication: the video in Spanish from the series "El tiempo en 2050", in which an area's weather is simulated over the span of 35 years.

== Controversy ==
Despite the fact that an independent report commissioned by TVE from the auditor KPMG concluded that public channels were not used for private purposes, on 31 July 2014, López was suspended from work and salary for 20 days for having "transgressed contractual good faith" with RTVE, having formed, together with Martín Barreiro Carreira, Albert Martínez Bobe, Albert Barniol Gil, David Torres Ayala, Ana Mariño López, and Marta Barniol Gil (three of whom were her colleagues), a limited company with no mercantile activity since its inception.

== Publications ==
- Si no plou, plourà (2007)

=== With the RTVE team ===
- El Libro de El Tiempo (2011)
- El Tiempo de la A a la Z (2012)
- Lunario 2014 (2013)
- Los refranes de El Tiempo (2014)

== Recognition ==
- Mention of Honor at the 2015 European Meteorological Society TV Weather Forecast Award competition
- 2016 Ondas Award for best presenter for the innovation of the weather information format, her ability to transform this content into a record of interest, and uncover the curiosity of viewers using different television tools
