= Olga Viza =

Spanish journalist

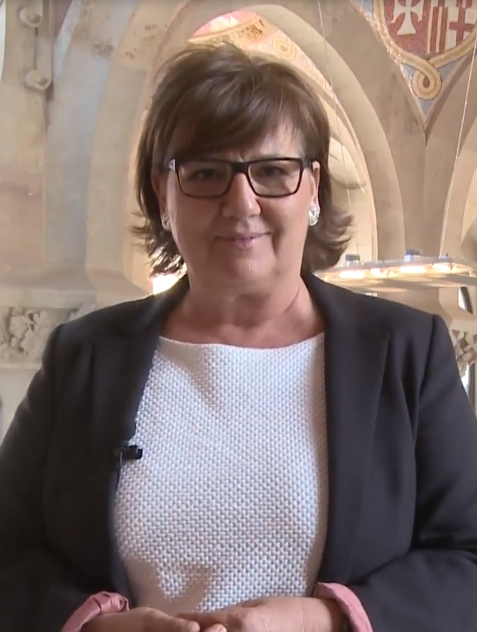
- Viza in 2017
- Born: Olga Viza López; 18 August 1958 (age 67); Barcelona, Spain
- Occupations: Journalist, writer, presenter
- Years active: 1978–present
- Awards: Ondas Award (1995); Iris Award (2002); TP de Oro (2002)

Olga Viza López (born 18 August 1958) is a Spanish journalist.

== Biography ==
Olga Viza made her debut on Televisión Española in January 1978, when she had not yet finished her studies in journalism, specifically on the show Polideportivo. In the following years, she would alternate between working in news and sportscasting, with sporadic incursions into other television genres, such as the musical program Exterior día (1981).

From the sports program Estadio 2, during the second half of the 1980s and early 1990s, she had the opportunity to cover the most prominent sporting events, from the World Cup in Spain to the 1992 Summer Olympics in Barcelona. She worked as a sportscaster on Telediario from 1987 to 1992.

In September 1992, she was hired by Antena 3. Until June 1998 she presented the noon edition of Antena 3 Noticias. During the 1993–1994 and 1994–1995 seasons she was accompanied in this task by José Antonio Gavira.

In September 1998, Viza returned to sportscasting on the second edition of Noticias, together with the news director Ernesto Sáenz de Buruaga. A year later, on the same edition, she co-presented the general news. In January 2001 she reunited with Matías Prats, with whom she had broadcast the Barcelona Olympics, on the program Noticias 1. She remained on this edition until September 2003, accompanied by Manu Carreño for her last season. Her departure from Antena 3 after 11 years coincided with a process of restructuring the network, which involved layoffs, although she left weeks before they began, after not finding a show to join.

On Antena 3 Internacional she presented the show Gente de Palabra.

After a brief stint at Telecinco with the program No es lo mismo in 2004, she went to laSexta, where she took over the interview program Habitación 623 in early 2006.

From 2004 to 2006 she presented the evening magazine El Tranvía de Olga on RNE Radio 1, working with Javier Capitán. In the 2006–2007 season she led the RNE morning program Las Mañanas de Radio 1.

In her career she has emphasized a specialty in sports coverage: six Olympic Games, three World Cups, Grand Prix motorcycle racing events, the Formula One World Championship, and gymnastics, tennis, and golf tournaments. In September 2007 she was hired by the sports newspaper Marca, where she published an interview every week.

On 3 March 2008, she moderated the second electoral debate between President José Luis Rodríguez Zapatero and opposition leader Mariano Rajoy.

In 2009 Viza returned to television, briefly joining the regional station Aragón TV and contributing to the TVE Catalonia program Vespre a la 2.

In 2022, back on Antena 3 Television, she joined as a collaborator on the program Y ahora Sonsoles, presented by Sonsoles Ónega.

== Awards and nominations ==
| Award | Year | Category | Result | Ref |
|---|---|---|---|---|
| TP de Oro | 1993 | Best Presenter | Nominee | |
| TP de Oro | 1995 | Best Presenter | Nominee | |
| TP de Oro | 2002 | Best Daily News | Winner | |
| Ondas Award | 1995 | National Television: Best Professional Work | Winner | |
| Iris Award | 2002 | Best News Program Communicator | Winner | |
