= Television academy =

"Television Academy" is used as the colloquial name of the Academy of Television Arts & Sciences.

Television Academy could also refer to:

== Australia ==
- Australian Academy of Cinema and Television Arts

== Canada ==
- Academy of Canadian Cinema & Television

== Israel ==
- Israeli Academy of Film and Television

== Spain ==
- Academy of Television and Audiovisual Arts and Sciences (Spain)

== United Kingdom ==
- British Academy of Film and Television Arts

== United States ==
- Academy of Television Arts & Sciences
- National Academy of Television Arts and Sciences
- International Academy of Television Arts and Sciences
