= Desirée Ndjambo =

Spanish journalist and presenter (born 1976)

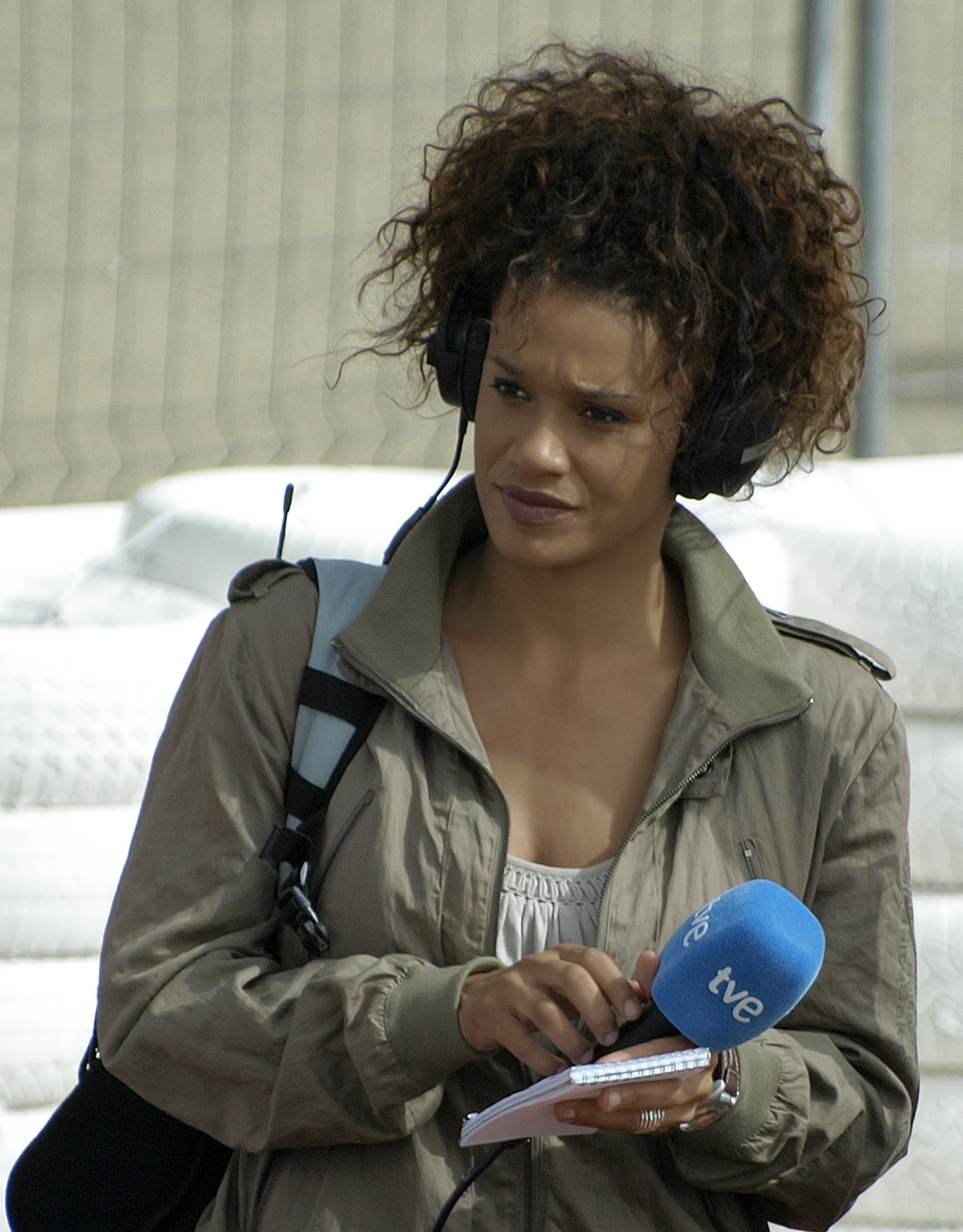
Desirée Ndjambo

Desirée Ndjambo León (born 17 October 1976) is a Spanish journalist and presenter.

She is a graduate in Journalism from the Universidad Carlos III and has a Diploma from the Universidad Complutense de Madrid. Ndjambo presented the sports section of the morning edition of Telediario on La 1 channel and with Ainhoa Arbizu she has presented the Moto GP World Championship for TVE. She now presents La 2 Noticias. Her father is from Equatorial Guinea and works as a technician at TVE.
