= Francine Gálvez =

Television presenter

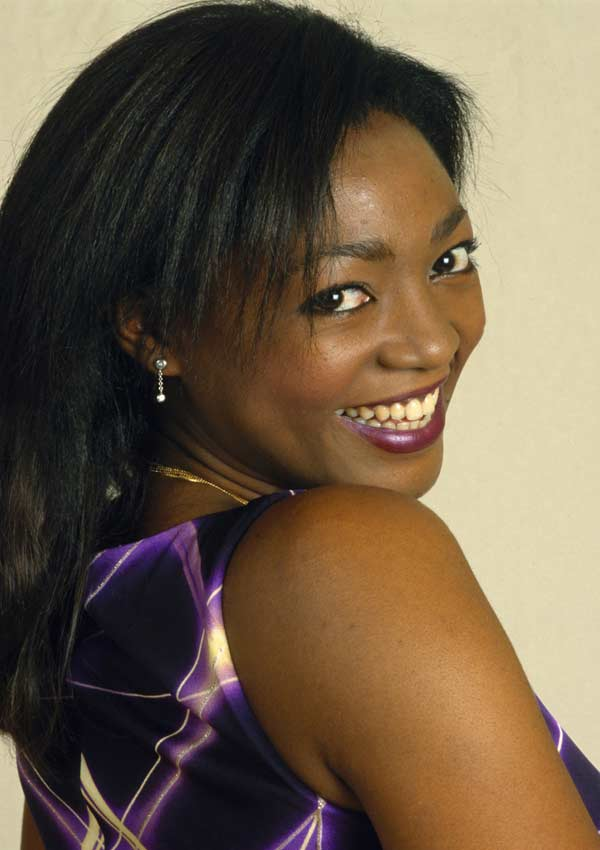
- Born: Francisca Nicolasa Gálvez Djouma; 13 September 1966 (age 60); Nkongsamba, Cameroon
- Education: Complutense University of Madrid, New York University School of Continuing and Professional Studies
- Career
- Stations: Televisión Española (1990–1993; 2005–2011); Telemadrid (1997–2001)

Francisca Nicolasa Gálvez Djouma (born 13 September 1966), better known as Francine Gálvez, is a Cameroonian-born Spanish television presenter. She was the first black woman to anchor a news programme in Europe.

== Biography ==
Gálvez was born on 13 September 1966 in Nkongsamba, Cameroon, and was raised since when she was two years old in Lopera (Jaén), Spain. She is polylingual.

She was educated at Isabel la Católica High School in Madrid, then studied journalism at the Complutense University of Madrid, graduating in 1989. She achieved a master's degree in Media Producing for Media and Entertainment at the New York University School of Continuing and Professional Studies.

In her early career, Gálvez was the only black Spanish woman who appeared on national television. From 1990, she anchored the weekend editions of Telediario, the flagship television newscast produced by Televisión Española (TVE), along with Ana Blanco, becoming the first black woman to anchor a news programme in Europe, as well as the first black presenter on a TVE programme.

In 1993, Gálvez hosted science and culture show Oxígeno on La 2, and also starred as a news reporter in the film Supernova.

From 1997 to 2000, Gálvez was part of the team presenting on the weekly magazine show Macumba TeVe on Telemadrid. In 2000 she was promoted to become a main presenter alongside Emilio Pineda.

In 2002, she presented the Spanish version of the international television series Temptation Island, Confianza Ciega on Antena 3.

Between 2005 and 2011, Gálvez hosted the game show Palabra por Palabra on TVE. From 2012 to 2013, she worked as a media journalist with AMC Networks International Southern Europe (AMC SE). From 2015 to 2018, she was a panellist on La 1's women's current affairs talk show Amigas y conocidas [es]. She hosted Telemadrid's New Year's Eve special with Víctor Sandoval on 31 December 2015.

In 2021, Gálvez returned to presenting with Emilio Pineda, presenting on Madrid Directo.

Alongside presenting, Gálvez has discussed racism and social attitudes in Madrid for Spanish print publications including El Periódico de España.
