= Eugenio Martín Rubio =

- Born: Eugenio Martín Rubio; 14 November 1923; Madrid, Spain
- Died: 21 February 2016 (aged 92); Alicante, Spain
- Occupations: weather presenter, meteorologist

Eugenio Martín Rubio (November 14, 1923 Madrid, Spain - February 21, 2016 Alicante, Spain ) was a Spanish meteorologist.

== Biography ==
Graduated in Physical Sciences by the University of Madrid, he started to work in the then National Institute of Meteorology. His leap to television was made gradually, since in the 1960's he was called by TVE to replace during absences weather presenter Mariano Medina.

At the end of 1960s he permanently appeared in the night edition of news program Telediario. He retired in 1980 when he was replaced by José Antonio Maldonado.

His most remembered anecdote happened when after a long drought in Madrid he promised rain the following day saying: "if tomorrow does not rain, I will shave my moustache". It didn't rain and Martín Rubio appeared next day shaven.
