= Ana Blanco =

Spanish journalist and news anchor

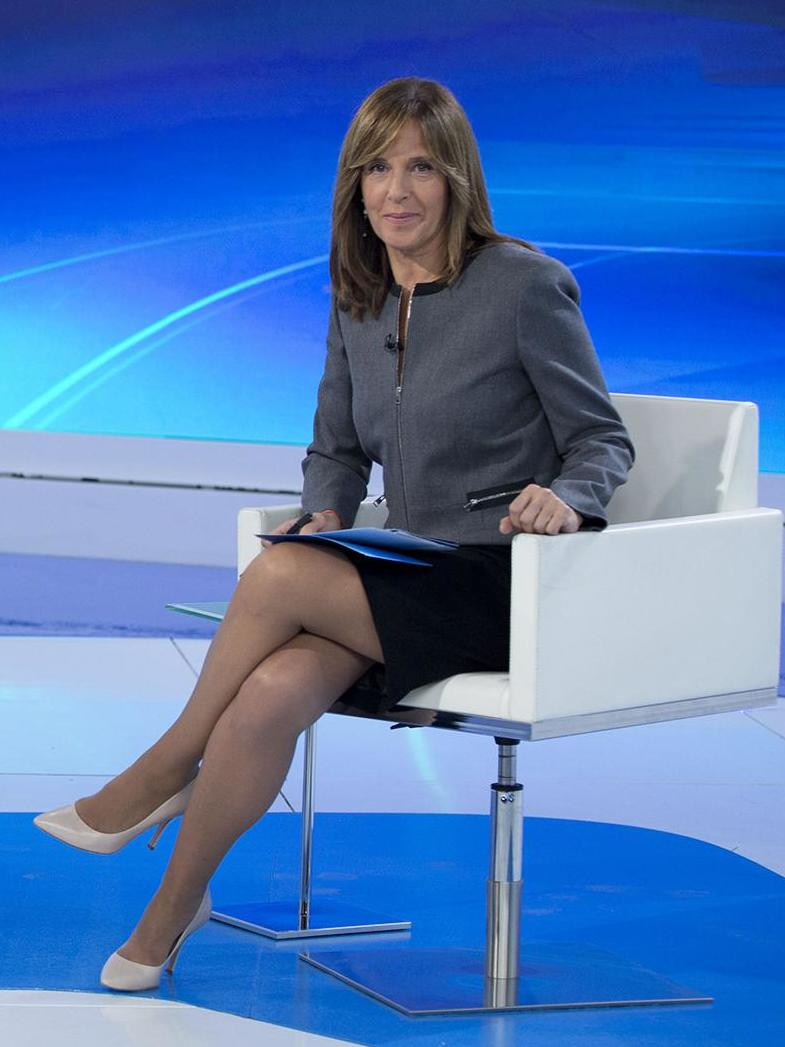
- Blanco in 2015
- Born: Ana Isabel Blanco López; 28 November 1960 (age 65); Bilbao, Biscay, Spain
- Education: University of Deusto
- Occupation: News anchor
- Years active: 1980–2024

Ana Isabel Blanco López (born 28 November 1960) is a Spanish newscaster. From 1990 to 2022 she anchored Televisión Española's flagship daily newscast Telediario, on its three main editions –afternoon, evening, and weekend– in different seasons. She also hosted for some time the weekly Informe Semanal.

== Career ==
Blanco started her career in radio in 1980 as a contributor of Cadena SER, later in 1989 she debuted in television as host, along with Agustín Bravo, of the cultural-oriented program Zip-zap in Telemadrid.

On 15 September 1990, she debuted on Televisión Española (TVE) as anchor of the weekend edition of Telediario along with Francine Gálvez. The following season (1991–92) she anchored the afternoon edition of Noticias de La 2. Since 28 September 1992, she anchored the different editions of Telediario –afternoon, evening, and weekend– in different seasons, making her the longest running presenters in the history of the newscast, celebrating her thirty years in 2020. On 11 September 2001, she opened Telediario 1 with the breaking live feed of the World Trade Center's North Tower in New York since it had been hit a few minutes before. She hosted that newscast, narrating the events live, for more than seven hours straight, making it the longest Telediario news bulletin in its history.

During all these years, she has also hosted numerous special informative programs, including special programs on the occasion of different elections, of major breaking news, of historic events, and of anniversaries of historic events. On 15 July 2022, after thirty-two years and more than 7,400 newscast presented on TVE she hosted a Telediario for the last time. On 29 August 2022, RTVE announced that she had stepped down the daily newscast. Although just a few days later she covered from London the events after the death of Queen Elizabeth II, this being her last work onscreen for the newscast. From 9 September 2023 until 24 February 2024, she hosted the weekly Informe Semanal. She decided to take early retirement, which will take effect on 29 March.

== Awards ==
- ATV award for best news anchor (2000, 2004, 2005, 2010, and 2012)
- Antena de Oro award (1999)
- TP de Oro for best news anchor (2007 and 2008)
- ATV Jesús Hermida Lifetime Achievement Award (2018)
