= Ana Ibáñez Llorente =

Spanish television news anchor (born 1981)

- Born: 1981 (age 44–45); La Rioja, Spain
- Occupation: News anchor

Ana Ibáñez Llorente (born Haro, La Rioja, Spain 1981) is a Spanish television news anchor based in Madrid, Spain. She can be seen on La 1.
