= Diego Gómez (journalist) =

Spanish journalist (1936–2021)

Diego Gómez Cabrera
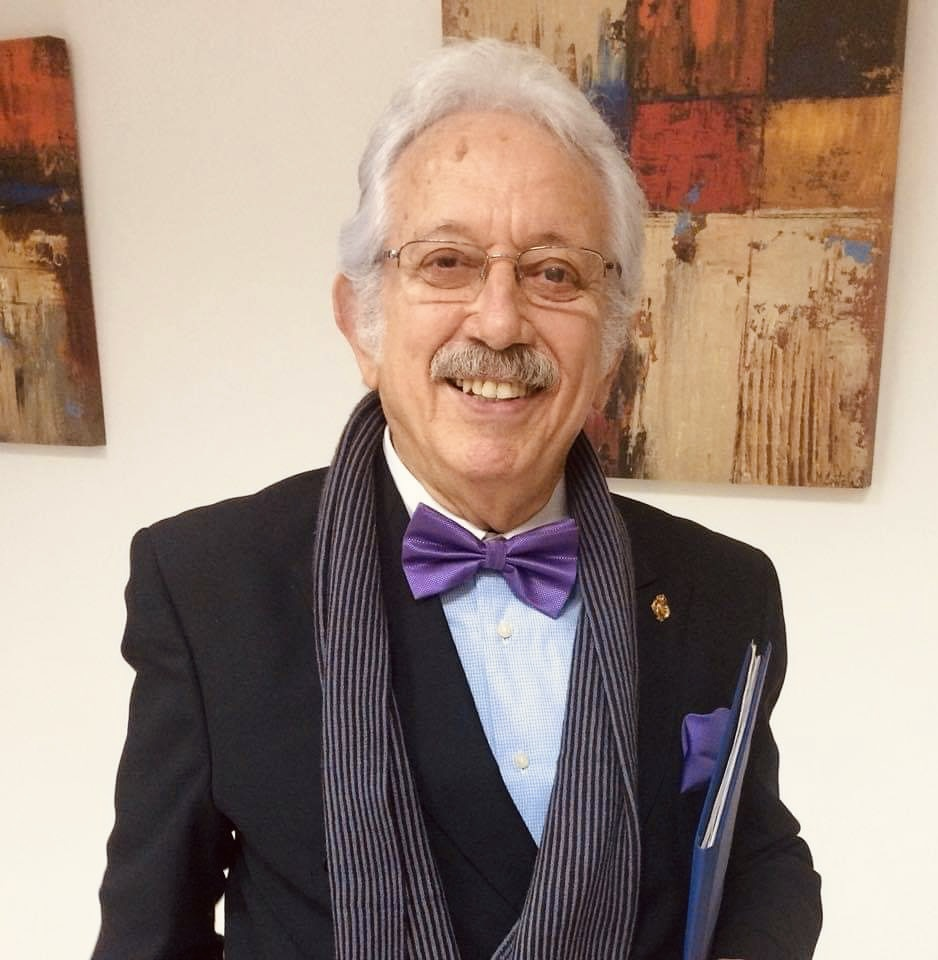
- Diego Gómez in 2015.
- Born: 1936; Málaga, Spain
- Died: 3 March 2021 (aged 84–85); Málaga, Spain
- Spouse: Lucía Redoli

Diego Gómez Cabrera (1936 – 3 March 2021) was a Spanish journalist, actor, editor, television presenter and broadcaster.

== Biography ==
Born in the Málaga district of Churriana in 1936, Gómez lived part of his childhood in the Huelin neighborhood. He studied drama at the Conservatory of Málaga.

He began his radio career through the airwaves of Radio Juventud-La Voz de Málaga, for nearly forty years presenting the program 'Cancionero', from which he broadcast and promoted songs. On Radio Juventud, he was a radio partner of María Teresa Campos. Together they presented, since 1972, the 'Estrellas de la Copla' program and for several years, various outdoor shows held at the Tivoli amusement park and other shows. Some time later, he took over the program ‘El patio de Radiolé’ on the Radiolé network and worked at Radio Nacional de España.

Gómez also appeared on the small screen, through Televisión Española, in the program 'Pasa la vida'; and in other channels such as: Localia Televisión and Canal Sur.

His incursion into the journalistic world took place through the newspaper Diario Sur where he wrote, for ten years, a weekly page entitled 'Musical Sunday'.

Closely linked to the world of Málaga confraternity, Gómez was the older brother of the Royal Brotherhood of Our Lady of Rocío de Málaga. For more than forty years, he broadcast the central acts of Holy Week in Málaga. Every year, he recited the poem by Luis María Cabanillas to the Captive Christ. He recorded several albums as a reciter of popular poems and lyrics with his unmistakable voice. Since 1988, he was a member of the San Juan de Ávila Family Apostolate Movement.

== Personal life and death ==
Gómez was married to Lucía Redoli; they had two children and four grandchildren. He died on 3 March 2021 at the age of 84 in the Regional Hospital of Málaga, where he had been admitted for several weeks because of the COVID-19 during the COVID-19 pandemic in Spain.
