= Mariano Medina =

Spanish meteorologist

- Born: Mariano Medina Isabel; 8 July 1922; Las Ventas con Peña Aguilera (Toledo), Spain
- Died: 28 December 1994 (aged 72); Madrid, Spain
- Occupations: Meteorologist, Weather presenter
- Years active: 1945–1985

Mariano Medina Isabel (8 July 1922, in Toledo – 28 December 1994, in Madrid) was a Spanish meteorologist and weather presenter. He was the first television weatherman in Spain appearing since the early broadcasts of Televisión Española (TVE), and holding the position for thirty years.

== Biography ==
He earned a degree in Physical-Chemical Science in 1943 at the University of Madrid and, in 1945, joined the State Meteorologists' Corps. In October 1947, he is assigned to the Aerodrome of San Pablo in Seville. During his stay in Seville he also taught at a local school. In 1949 he is assigned to Madrid–Barajas Airport.

He began his media career on the radio, presenting the weather forecasts on a popular show called Cabalgata Fin de Semana (Weekend Cavalcade) on Cadena SER, Spain's oldest radio network, where he came to be known as "The Weatherman".

He joined Televisión Española (TVE) when the network began operations, with the first weather forecast airing on 2 November 1956. He became the weatherman for Telediario since its premiere on 15 September 1957, a position he held until his retirement in 1985.

== Publications ==
- El Tiempo es Noticia/Iniciación a la Meteorología (various editions 1964-1994).
- La Mar y el Tiempo : Metereología Nautica para Aficionados, Navegacíon Deportiva y Pescadores, Juventud (1974, 1999)
- Meteorolgía Básica Sinóptica, Paraninfo (1976) ISBN 84-283-0734-2
- Teoría de la Predicción Meteorológica, Publicaciones del INM; 1984
- La Predicción del Tiempo Basada en Teoremas de la Vorticidad, Publicaciones del INM; 1988
