= La 1 (Spanish TV channel) =

Spanish national public television network

- Logo used since 2026
- Country: Spain
- Broadcast area: Spain and Andorra, reaching bordering regions via overspill of the Spanish terrestrial network
- Network: Televisión Española (TVE)
- Headquarters: Prado del Rey, Pozuelo de Alarcón (Madrid)

Programming
- Languages: Spanish: Regional opt-outs: Catalan (Note: Regional news opt-outs for Catalonia and the Balearic Islands (full programme) and the Valencian Community (some news stories change language into Spanish), as well as programming exclusive to the Catalonia feed.); Basque (Note: Regional news opt-outs for the Basque Country and Navarre (only a small section, usually around 1-2 minutes long, near the end).); Galician (Note: Regional news opt-outs for Galicia (full programme).)
- Picture format: 4K UHDTV HDR (Note: The UHD upscaled broadcast of La 1's high definition signal includes the transmission of some native contents produced in UHD-4K, but lacks the regional opt-outs.); 1080i HDTV

Ownership
- Owner: Radiotelevisión Española (RTVE)
- Sister channels: La 2; Clan; 24h; Teledeporte; Star TVE; TVE Internacional

History
- Launched: 28 October 1956; 70 years ago
- Former names: TVE (1956–1965); TVE-VHF (1965–1966); Primera Cadena (1966–1976); TVE 1 (1976–1991); La Primera (1991–2007)

Links
- Website: rtve.es/play/la-1

Availability

Terrestrial
- Digital terrestrial television: Spain: Varies by province: Andalusia; Almería: 31; Cádiz: 22; Córdoba: 22; Granada: 22; Huelva: 40; Jaén: 22; Málaga: 24; Seville: 22; Aragon; Huesca: 46; Teruel: 39; Saragossa: 46; Asturias: 39; Balearic Islands: 45; Basque Country; Biscay: 22; Gipuzkoa: 22; Álava: 22; Canary Islands (Note: The Canary Islands have a special version of the channel, labelled La 1 Canarias, with extra opt-out programming and displaying all clocks on the screen, teletext or guide one hour behind to accommodate the islands' time zone.); Las Palmas: 28; Santa Cruz de Tenerife: 45; Cantabria: 25; Castile and León; Ávila: 28; Burgos: 41; León: 21; Palencia: 22; Salamanca: 22; Segovia: 28; Soria: 45; Valladolid: 22; Zamora: 22; Castile-La Mancha; Albacete: 45; Ciudad Real: 30; Cuenca: 42; Guadalajara: 29; Toledo: 40; Catalonia (Note: Catalonia has a special version of the channel, labelled La 1 Catalunya, with extra opt-out programming in Catalan.); Barcelona: 31; Girona: 45; Lleida: 31; Tarragona: 31; Ceuta: 28; Community of Madrid: 33; Extremadura; Badajoz: 36; Cáceres: 36; Galicia; A Coruña: 22; Lugo: 47; Ourense: 47; Pontevedra: 24; La Rioja: 46; Melilla: 21; Region of Murcia: 38; Navarre: 29; Valencian Community; Alicante: 22; Castellón: 22; Valencia: 22; Andorra: 45; Pyrénées-Orientales (France): 37; Elvas (Portugal): 36

Streaming media
- rtve.es: Live

La 1 (Spanish pronunciation: [la ˈuno], The One) is a Spanish free-to-air television channel owned and operated by Televisión Española (TVE), the television division of state-owned public broadcaster Radiotelevisión Española (RTVE). It is the corporation's flagship television channel and is known for broadcasting mainstream and generalist programming, including Telediario news bulletins, prime time drama, cinema and entertainment, and major breaking news, sports and special events.

== History ==
=== Overview ===
It was launched on 28 October 1956 as the first regular television service in Spain. It was the only one until 15 November 1966, when TVE launched a second channel. As TVE held a monopoly on television broadcasting in the country, they were the only television channels until the first regional public television station was launched on 16 February 1983, when Euskal Telebista started broadcasting in the Basque Country. Commercial television was launched on 25 January 1990, when Antena 3 started broadcasting nationwide.

The channel was initially simply referred to as "Televisión Española" until the launch of its second channel in 1966. Since then it received other names, such as "Primera Cadena", "Primer Programa", "TVE-1", "TVE1" or "La Primera" until it adopted its current name "La 1" (La uno) in 2008. Its headquarters and main production center is Prado del Rey in Pozuelo de Alarcón. Although almost all its programming is in Spanish and is the same for all of Spain, TVE has territorial centers in every autonomous community and produces and broadcasts some local programming in regional variations in each of them, such as local news bulletins, in the corresponding co-official language.

On 1 January 2010, TVE stopped broadcasting commercial advertising on all its channels, with only self promotions, institutional campaigns and sponsorships allowed.

With analog service discontinued on 3 April 2010, it has only been available free-to-air through the digital terrestrial television (DTT) ever since. La 1 and Teledeporte started their DDT HDTV resolution simulcasts on 31 December 2013, initially in 720p and later in 1080i. With standard-definition feed discontinued on 11 February 2024, the UHDTV regular simulcast in 4K resolution was launched nationwide.

=== Background ===
Before the creation of the current Televisión Española, Spain had experimental television broadcasts since as early as the late 1940s. Between 1 November 1950 and 1956, Radio Nacional de España held an experimental service from the Paseo de La Habana studios in Madrid, with coverage limited to the Madrid area and no less than fifteen television sets. In addition to live programs, on 24 October 1954 it aired the first live televised football match in Spanish TV history, between Real Madrid and Racing de Santander, with equipment borrowed from Marconi España. In December 1955, the bases were created for a new television organization, Televisión Española, through the approval of the National Television Plan.

=== Inauguration of Televisión Española ===
Televisión Española started its regular broadcasts on 28 October 1956, from its studios located at Paseo de La Habana in Madrid. At launch, TVE was a government organ dependent on the General Directorate of Broadcasting and Television of the Ministry of Information and Tourism, which at the time was led by Gabriel Arias-Salgado. In this sense, RTVE's first director-general was Jesús Suevos, one of the founders of the Spanish Phalanx in Galicia, and the launch date was closer to its founding anniversary, which took place one day later.

TVE-1's regular broadcasts began at 20:30, with the intervention of minister Arias Salgado and TVE's director. It was followed by a religious ceremony which blessed the studios in honor of Saint Clare, patron saint of television. It was then followed by a musical interlude, NO-DO documentaries, regional dances by Coros y Danzas de la Sección Femenina, and a piano concert. The inaugural broadcast ended shortly before midnight. As there were no videotaping systems in place at the time, those first minutes are not in the channel's archives, relying only on the images captured by NO-DO. Gabriel Arias Salgadopronounced the first words:

Today, 28 October, Sunday, day of Chirst the Lord, to whom all power has been granted to Heaven and Earth, marks the inauguration of the new equipment and studios of Televisión Española.

The inauguration could only be received in a few areas of the Spanish capital, though the press highlighted that it could be seen sixty kilometers away from Madrid. Few people had a television set, which at the time cost 30 000 pesetas, a high cost for the time. There were only 600 television sets, which were mostly offers to high executives of Franquism on behalf of their respective ministries.

Since the beginning, Televisión Española was known for rejecting the idea of being financed using a license fee, unlike what happened in other European countries, such as the United Kingdom (BBC) or Italy (RAI). The group developed a mixed financing system, based on the General State Budget and advertising. However, the first television commercial did not air until 1957, in the form of a sponsor from Westinghouse. For this reason, TVE's programming was seriously limited. In its early months, its airtime was reduced to three hours, from 21:00 to midnight. The television service was interrupted in the summer of 1957, going on vacation, but viewer protests caused TVE to refuse repeating this idea in the following year. Although in 1957 a television tax "based on the size of the screen" was suggested, the plan was quickly removed.

=== Development of television ===
Over time, Televisión Española improved its programming with the arrival of new formats, such as game show Preguntas al espacio presented by Laura Valenzuela, the first known face of national television. Its most important event took place in September 1957, when the network imposed its own news services under the name Telediario. TVE previously depended on NO-DO, the newsreel which was projected before movies in cinemas during the dictatorship of Francisco Franco. Broadcasts were expanded to cover the afternoon, from 14:30 to the mid-afternoon, later returning in the evening. The first commercial breaks were also included, which joined the sponsorship agreements and became the primary source of revenue. Despite everything, the number of television sets continued to be low, with no less than 12 000 receivers.

Most programs were produced live from the Paseo de La Habana studio, mostly music shows and drama works. The facilities had a 100-square meter set and programming was controlled by the state. The first recorded programs only arrived in 1958, with the airing of the US series Sea Hunt. This was later followed by I Love Lucy and Perry Mason. The series arrived from South America with dubs made in Puerto Rico and Mexico; TVE only hired local dubbing studios from the mid-1970s.

In February 1959, test broadcasts in other Spanish cities began, through a network of relayers. On 15 September, the Miramar studios in Barcelona were inaugurated. One month later, a high-power relay was installed at Alto de Guarramillas at Sierra de Guadarrama (Madrid), which amplified the coverage radius to all of Castilla. Relay stations were later installed one by one in subsequent years: Valencia, Zaragoza and Bilbao (1960), Galicia and Seville (1961), Murcia (1962), and other provincial capitals. The network was completed in 1964 with the opening of a production center in the Canary Islands which was an autonomous operation until 1971.

At the time, TVE's first international links through the European Broadcasting Union, of which Radio Nacional was a member since 1955, took place, from the Miramar studios. The first event covered by the channel was the visit of US president Dwight D. Eisenhower to Spain. TVE's definitive entrance into the EBU's Eurovision network took place in December 1960, when it broadcast the marriage between Fabiola de Mora y Aragón with King Baudouin of Belgium. One year later, it took part in the Eurovision Song Contest for the first time.

=== Consolidación de la primera cadena ===
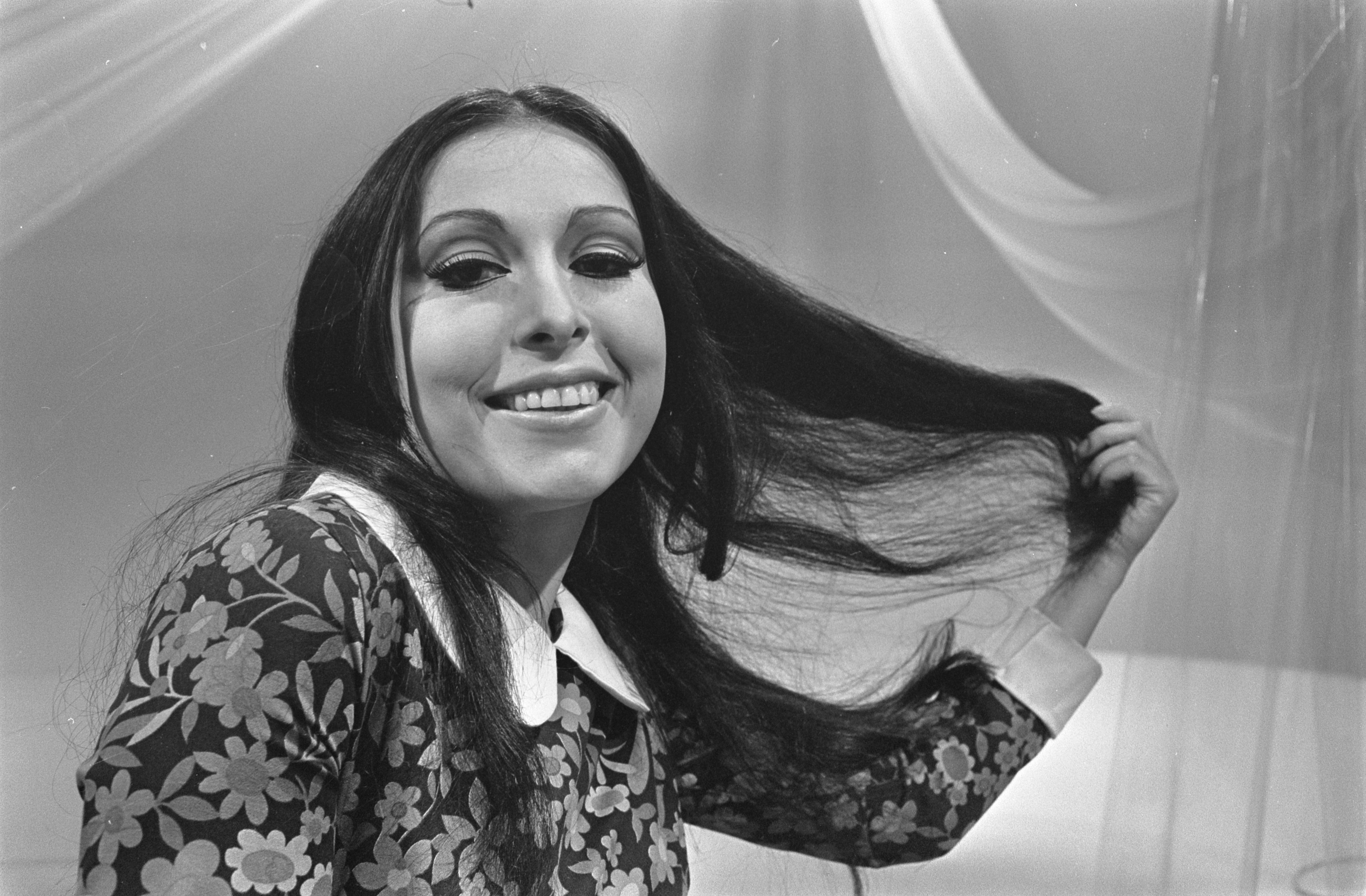
Singer Massiel, winner of the Eurovision Song Contest 1968, representing TVE.

Televisión Española's development was hampered by the paucity of television sets, such were imported and taxed for being luxury items. This situation changed from 1962, with the arrival of Manuel Fraga to the Information Ministry and the naming of Jesús Aparicio-Bernal as RTVE's general directors. The new direction gave impulse to the construction of the Prado del Rey studios, inaugurated on 18 July 1964 with the presence of Francisco Franco. The new facilities had larger sets and new technical equipment, improving the situation of television in Spain.

Moreover, on 1 January 1965, TVE started testing its second television channel, which broadcast on the UHF band, hence the codename UHF (currently, La 2). TVE moved alternative programs to the second channel, while making the first channel as a family-oriented generalist service. On the other hand, TVE-1 was the more accessible channel out of the two for the general population, because most television sets only picked up VHF signals and, to receive UHF signals, these sets required a UHF converter. VHF-UHF television sets were still scarce at the time.

Demand for television in Spain grew thanks to the success of presenters such as Laura Valenzuela or weatherman Mariano Medina, the football and bullfighting broadcasts, and the increasing amount of US-made television series. In 1964, the number of viewers finally surpassed one million, and to impulse the new technology, the government suppressed the luxury tax for each receiver, enabling them to be bought in quotas. In addition, places known as Teleclubes opened, which had a television set for smaller villages and brought the technology to distant areas of the country.

Finally, several events accelerated the consolidation of TVE and its first channel, due to its wide following. First came Spain's victory in the 1968 Eurovision Song Contest and the hosting of the event the next year, followed by the moon landings, commented by Jesús Hermida. Game shows such as Cesta y puntos, Un millón para el mejor or Un, dos, tres... responda otra vez and drama slots such as Estudio 1 also gained popularity. These developments enabled the multiplication of the amount of sets available, reaching four million in 1970.

During Juan José Rosón's period in front of RTVE, he aspired producing and airing quality products to improve the country's image abroad. Key examples included Historia de la frivolidad from Narciso Ibáñez Serrador and El Irreal Madrid from Valerio Lazarov.

On the other hand, TVE started airing in colour, on this channel, using the PAL system. The standard was introduced in 1969 and it technically enabled color broadcasting, even though TVE's infrastructure wasn't ready for that. The 1969 Eurovision Song Contest, produced by TVE in Madrid, was recorded with color cameras borrowed from the BBC for the Eurovision network, but in Spain, it was only seen in black and white, a version that is still preserved at the TVE archives. Between 1967 and 1972, some color programs were shot on film cameras, though occasionally, and facing the 1972 Summer Olympics there was a test broadcast. Finally, TVE's first regular color broadcast came in September 1972 with the premiere of the music show Divertido siglo. In 1973, a specific production area was built at the Prado del Rey studios, and color programes started increasing gradually until they occupied the entire schedule in 1978.

=== TVE-1 in democracy ===
After the death of Francisco Franco, the first channel remained as the main public television channel, which had a generalist output. However, the end of the dictatorship and the Spanish transition to democracy motivated the arrival of new formats to TVE, which was used as a medium to accelerate the democratic narrative. The news service gave voice to opposition figures which, in the past, did not appear due to censorship imposed by Franquism. On the other hand, series such as Curro Jiménez and works such as La barraca o Los gozos y las sombras, emerged, which broke from the channel's prior format of a family channel. Also successful were the Lorimar series Dallas and Falcon Crest, whose ratings surpassed over ten million viewers.

New formats grew after the arrival of the first PSOE government in the 1980s and its first two director-generals: José María Calviño and Pilar Miró. Under the two mandates, the first channel's schedule became more dynamic and paved way for more alternative formats such as La bola de cristal or Planeta imaginario. Spanish programming increased, especially in fiction and comedy, and the schedule adopted a more fixed layout in terms of genres and airtimes, with limited variations and blocks of series, which consolidated a fixed timeslot for the viewer.

Although TVE-1 did a few experimental morning airings since the 1960s, it did not start regular service until 13 January 1986, with the first airing of Buenos días at 7:30am. The next year saw the arrival of Por la mañana, the first morning magazine directed by Jesús Hermida which also saw the rise in notoriety of Nieves Herrero and María Teresa Campos.

In 1988, during Miró's mandate, the Estudios Buñuel complex in Madrid was inaugurated, which at the time had the largest TV studio in Europe (2400 m²), Studio L-3, to record programming that needed a large studio. The studios continued in operation until late 2015.

=== Arrival of private television ===
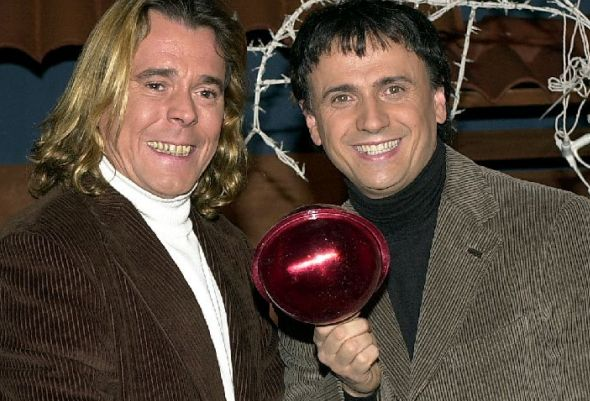
Comedy duo Cruz y Raya, formed by Juan Muñoz y José Mota.

With the arrival of private television, Televisión Española restructured its two channels and centered its goal on TVE-1 competing with Antena 3 and Tele 5 in terms of content. That way, TVE-1 reaffirmed its position as a generalist channel, but opened its programming to a more commercial and less cultural array of formats, moving all of the alternative programming to La 2. An example was the proliferation of Latin American telenovelas in the afternoon schedule. The first of these was Los ricos también lloran in 1986, during the morning schedule, and, later, in the afternoon, Cristal, Abigaíl or Agujetas de color de rosa.

In 1995, TVE-1 officially became La Primera, a name it kept until 2007 and maintained a commercial programming line, competing directly with the two main private networks. Despite the loss in viewers with the arrival of competition, TVE-1 was still the leader throughout all of the 90s and the early 2000s. Early 2000s hits included Cuéntame cómo pasó, comedy shows from Cruz y Raya and the reality format Operación Triunfo, whose first edition in 2001 was a social phenomenon, with ratings of up to 80% share.

With the defeat of the People's Party in 2004, the new prime minister, José Luis Rodríguez Zapatero, made a series of changes to Televisión Española's structure, which caused some criticism from the conservative sector. Although it kept its commercial profile, La Primera removed some programs which the corporation thought to be inappropriate and other that had lost ratings, such as Noche de fiesta or Operación Triunfo. There were also large changes in the news division.

La Primera lost its annual leadership for the first time in 2004, falling behind Telecinco. At this time, it centered its efforts on national production and special events. This way, the channel (La 1 from 2007) recovered its leadership for a few months in 2008 yand full-time in 2009. From the changes in the method of electing presidents at RTVE and the removal of commercial advertising, the news operation had a greater independence than in the 1980s and 90s. Under the management of Fran Llorente, who was its news director from 2004 to 2012, the second edition of Telediario won the award for best newscast in the world at the Media Tenor Global TV Awards in 2009, and in 2011, it won the Premio Nacional de Televisión. with the suppression of advertising on TVE from 2010, La 1 maintained its leadership in ratings in Spain until 2012, when it was surpassed by Telecinco and Antena 3.

In the 2020s,the channel prioritizes news, original series and special events to compete against private channels, as well as promoting content for the streaming platform RTVE Play. In July 2023, after eleven years, La 1 recovered its second position in ratings, placing it behind Antena 3. It recovered its first place in June 2024, largely due to Euro 2024, which was won by the Spanish team. It kept in July because of the 2024 Summer Olympics, and since then, it had consolidated its position in second place, largely due to the success of formats such as La revuelta and La Promesa.

== Logo history ==
first logo; 1956 to 1962

1962 to 1982

1982 to 1989

1984

1989 to 1991

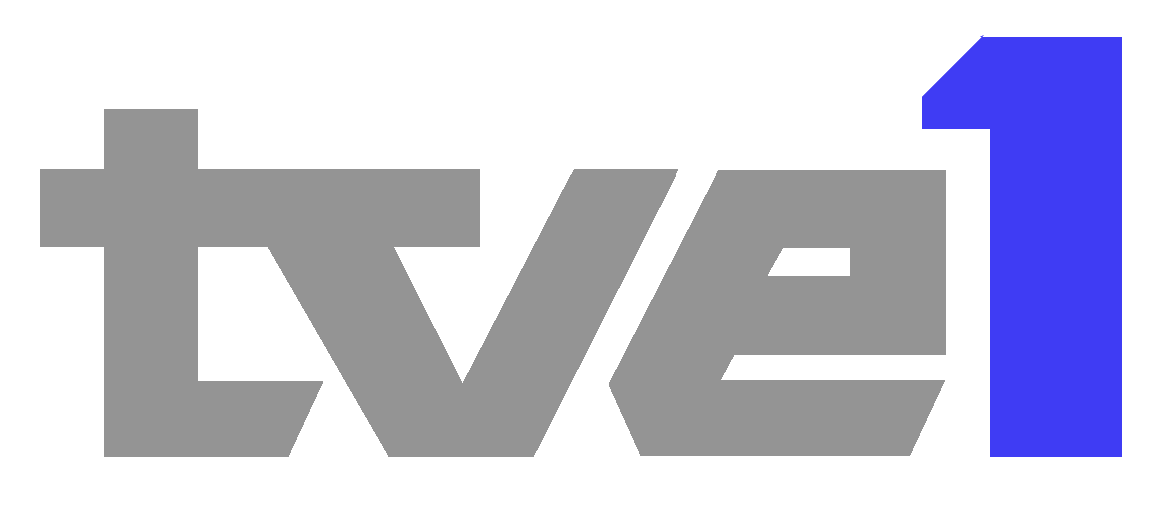
1991 to 1992

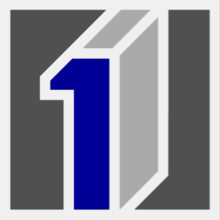
1992 to 1994

1994 to 1999

1999 to 2007

2008 to 2026

In use since 2026

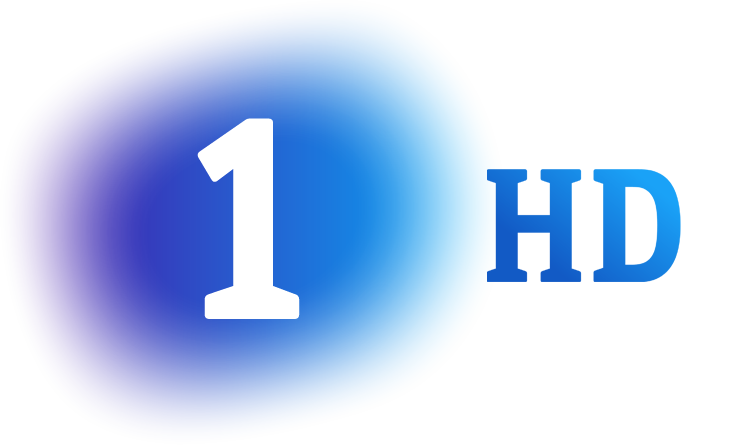
Variation of the logo for the HD signal between 2014 and 2019

Variation of the logo for the UHD signal between 2024 and 2026

Variation of the logo for the UHD signal since 2026

== International availability ==
=== Portugal ===
The channel was formerly available in northern Portugal through a network of illegal relays. These relays were used as an alternative to the existing RTP monopoly prior to the 1990s.

== Criticism and controversy ==
Due to its status as a public service and pioneer television channel in Spain, La 1 has been criticized on numerous occasions for aspects related to its programming. Within TVE's offer, the first channel has been characterized by a general offer that competes directly with a private television, relegating any alternative or public service space to La 2. This practice has been maintained even after the withdrawal of advertising in 2010.

The Association of Viewers and Radio Listeners (ATR) denounced in 2005 that La 1 had been the channel that had broken the Self-regulation Code on Television Content and Children the most times, a total of 169 times. For its part, the management of the channel assured that many of the documented complaints had been based on "subjective criteria".

Since 2014, there has been a debate on television schedules in Spain: for reasons of screen share, prime time has been delayed in recent years until 10:30 p.m. and many programs ended at dawn. That same year, TVE signed an agreement with the Ministry of Health, Social Services and Equality for a "healthy use of television", which implied bringing forward the programming hours and ending them before 00:00. However, La 1 has not fulfilled the commitment in its prime time and some programs such as the MasterChef Celebrity final have even ended at two in the morning.

=== Information services ===
One of the most controversial aspects is the work of information services. The appointment of the presidency of RTVE, responsible in turn for the rest of the departments, has historically depended on the Congress of Deputies by absolute majority, without the need for consensus. For this reason, it is considered that the editorial line of the Telediario, the news program with the most audience in the entire group has been tilted in favor of the government in power, both during the Franco's dictatorship and in current democratic Spain. There have been denunciations of disinformation in the governments of Adolfo Suárez, Felipe González, José María Aznar, in the latter case including a sentence from the National Court for "violation of trade union rights" in the news coverage of the 2002 general strike.

The government of José Luis Rodríguez Zapatero changed the system for electing the presidency of RTVE in 2006, through a consensus of two-thirds of Congress, intending to grant more independence to the information services. However, Mariano Rajoy's executive recovered the previous model in 2012 to resolve the power vacuum in the radio station. Since then, the TVE News Council (made up of the house's employees) has reported more than 70 cases of alleged malpractice on the newscast and on the weekly report, all of them related to current affairs: the various cases of corruption affecting the Popular Party, the Bárcenas case, the focus of the pro-sovereignty process in Catalonia, or the positioning of news in the rundown. In addition, some journalists have denounced the gestation of a "parallel newsroom" to which the most sensitive information would be entrusted.

In September 2017, the Cortes Generales approved a new election system on RTVE that recovered the previous consensus model and established a public contest for the election of the presidency. The new system was applied in February 2021, after three years of temporary administration of a sole provisional administrator.
