= Academy of Television and Audiovisual Arts and Sciences (Spain) =

Spanish television organization

- Academia de Televisión y de las Ciencias y Artes del Audiovisual
- Abbreviation: ATV
- Founded: 1997
- Type: Nonprofit
- Location: Pozuelo de Alarcón, Spain
- President: María Casado

The Academy of Television and Audiovisual Arts and Sciences (Spanish: Academia de Televisión y de las Ciencias y Artes del Audiovisual) is a Spanish non-profit organization created in 1997 to bring together audiovisual professionals and companies with the aim of defending the quality, independence and autonomy of the television industry in the country. The academy presents annually the Iris Awards to recognize excellence in Spanish television production.

== History ==
The Academy of Sciences and Television Arts of Spain (Academia de las Ciencias y las Artes de Televisión de España) was a project launched at the end of 1996 by a group of television professionals led by Jesús Hermida. On 28 January 1997, the founding act was signed and, after several months of work by the different commissions, on 30 October 1997, the constituent General Assembly was held.

== Iris Awards ==
Since 1998, the academy has awarded its awards with the purpose of distinguishing and rewarding the most outstanding audiovisual professionals and programs in Spain. First known as the ATV Awards (Premios de la Academia de Televisión/Premios ATV), they are known as the Iris Awards (Premios Iris) since 2011.

== Presidents ==
- Jesús Hermida (1997–1998)
- Antonio Mercero (1998–2000)
- Ignacio Salas (2000–2006)
- Manuel Campo Vidal (2006–2018)
- María Casado (since 2018)
