= Iris Awards (Spain) =

Spanish television awards

- Awarded for: Television merits
- Country: Spain
- Presented by: Academy of Television and Audiovisual Arts and Sciences
- Formerly called: ATV Awards
- First award: 1999

The Iris Awards (Spanish: Premios Iris), known until 2011 as ATV Awards (Spanish: Premios de la Academia de TV / Spanish: Premios ATV), are television awards given by the Spanish Academy of Television and Audiovisual Arts and Sciences.

== History ==
The awards were created in 1998, when Antonio Mercero was at the helm of the academy. The first ceremony was held in February 1999. In 2012, they were renamed to Iris Awards, upon a suggestion brought forward by deceased academy member Tomás Zardoya. The award's design was also modified, bringing a statuette representing an eye which simulates a camera diaphragm. Prior to that, the design consisted of a statuette designed by Pello Irazu representing a Victory of Samothrace. The celebration of the 22nd edition (corresponding to 2020) was postponed due to the COVID-19 pandemic, and the academy eventually determined to give the awards jointly with those of the 23rd edition.

The main awards are voted by the academy members before a notary, although separate awards "del Jurado" (given by a group of television professionals) and "de la Crítica" (given by critics and television analysts) have been also called.

As of 2021, the categories included: Best Actor, Best Actress, Best Direction, Best Fiction, Best Screenplay, Best TV Newscast, Best Newscast Presenter, Best TV Show Presenter, Best Production, Best TV Show, Best Children Show, Best Show Produced by a Themed Channel, Best Making.

== Editions ==
- 20th Iris Awards at Cines Kinépolis, Pozuelo de Alarcón (23 October 2018)
- 21st Iris Awards at Nuevo Teatro Alcalá, Madrid (18 November 2019)
- 25th Iris Awards at Gran Teatro Caixabank Príncipe Pío, Madrid (16 January 2024)
- 26th Iris Awards at Gran Teatro Caixabank Príncipe Pío, Madrid (14 January 2025)
- 27th Iris Awards at Teatro Real, Madrid (16 February 2026)
