= Premios Ondas =

Television and radio award

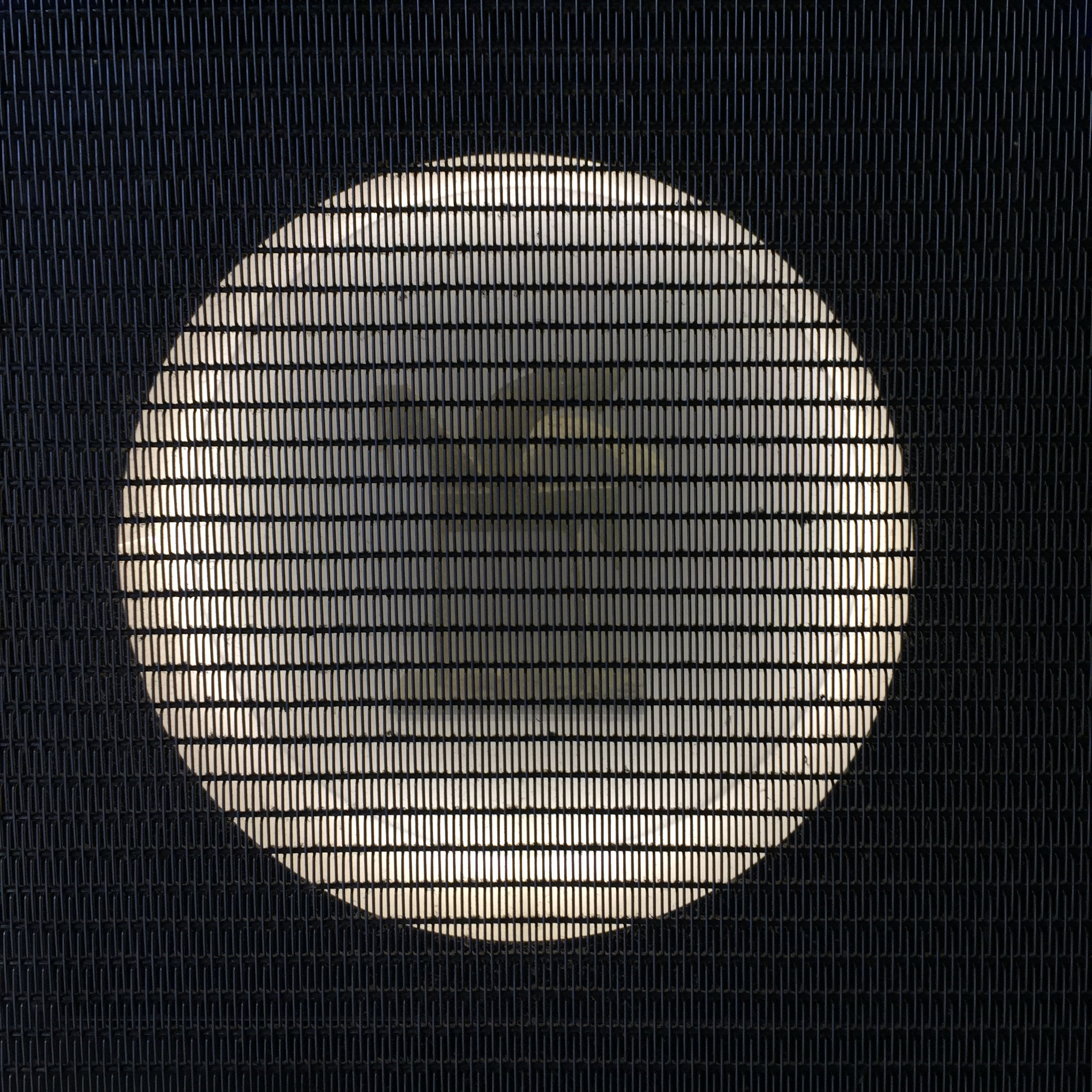
Premio Ondas

The Premios Ondas (Spanish: literally "wave awards", also known in English as the Ondas Awards or simply The Ondas) have been given since 1954 by Radio Barcelona, a subsidiary of Cadena SER, in recognition of professionals in the fields of radio and television broadcasting, the cinema, and the music industry.

Past winners have included R.E.M., U2, The Corrs, Eric Clapton, the Red Hot Chili Peppers, Cher, Gloria Estefan, Miguel Bosé, Luz Casal, Phil Collins, Joaquín Sabina, Mecano, Ketama, Coldplay, Ricky Martin, Mikael Bertelsen & Roger Moore.
