= 20th Iris Awards (Spain) =

Television awards

- Date: 23 October 2018
- Site: Cines Kinépolis, Ciudad de la Imagen, Pozuelo de Alarcón
- Hosted by: Boris Izaguirre
- Organized by: Academy of Television Arts and Sciences

Television coverage
- Network: Twitter

The 20th Iris Awards ceremony, organised by the Academy of Television Arts and Sciences, honoured the best in Spanish television of 2018 and took place at the Cines Kinépolis in Pozuelo de Alarcón on 23 October 2018.

== Awards ==
The 20th Iris Awards were held on 23 October 2018 at the Cines Kinépolis, in Ciudad de la Imagen, Madrid region, Spain. Hosted by Boris Izaguirre, the ceremony was broadcast on Twitter. The television channel Antena 3 was the night's biggest winner, as well as the shows Cocaine Coast and Operación Triunfo. Besides the Iris awards conceded by the academy, the jury's and critics' Iris awards were also delivered during the ceremony. The critics' award was gifted to Atresmedia Studios' Sonia Martínez. The jury's awards were gifted to Carlos Sedes & Jorge Torregrossa, Clásicos y Reverentes, Eso no se pregunta, Informe Robinson, Jalis de la Serna (for Enviado especial) and Elena de Lorenzo. The awards given by the academy are listed as follows:

Best Actor: Javier Rey — Cocaine Coast (Antena3); Ginés García Millán — La verdad (Telecinco); Jaime Blanch — El Ministerio del Tiempo (La1); Javier Gutiérrez — Estoy vivo (La1); Oriol Pla — El día de mañana (Movistar+); Quim Gutiérrez — El accidente (Telecinco)	Best Actress: Úrsula Corberó — Money Heist (Antena3); Alba Flores — Locked Up (Fox); Aura Garrido — El día de mañana (Movistar+); Inma Cuesta — El accidente (Telecinco); Michelle Jenner — Cathedral of the Sea (Antena3); Patricia López Arnaiz — A Different View (La1)
Best Direction: Carlos Sedes, Jorge Torregrossa — Cocaine Coast (Antena3); Patricia Fernández, Hugo Tomás — MasterChef (La1); Survivor's direction team (Telecinco); Jesús Colmenar, Sandra Gallego, David Molina, Jesús Rodrigo — Locked Up (Fox); Joanna Pardos — Radio Gaga (0#/Movistar+); Mariano Barroso — El día de mañana (Movistar+)	Best Fiction: Cocaine Coast (Antena3); El accidente (Telecinco); El día de mañana (Movistar+); Estoy vivo (La1); Money Heist (Antena3); Paquita Salas — Netflix
Best Screenplay: Ramón Campos, Teresa Fernández-Valdés, Gema R. Neira, Cristóbal Garrido, Diego Sotelo, David Moreno — Cocaine Coast (Antena3); El intermedio's writing team (Note: Alberto González Vázquez, Manuel Gay Moreno, Raquel Haro Pérez, Diego Saucedo Tejado, Yaiza Nuevo Ojeda, Olalla Granja Rodríguez, Irene Varela Maestre, Mikel Uribe-Etxeberria, Miguel Cuervo Pérez, Juan Carlos Córdoba Paredes, Iratxe Fernández de Velasco Sanz, David Dato Pérez, Carles Sánchez, David César, Paco Páez) (laSexta); Daniel Écija, Jesús Mesas, Guillermo Cisneros, Jon de la Cuesta, Federico Muñoz, Andrés Martín, Guillermo Clua, Jaime Palacios, Mercedes Cruz, Adriana Rivas — Estoy vivo (La1); Zapeando's writing team (Note: Eloy Salgado, Gabriel García Soto, Víctor López, Óscar Arenas, María Vega, Estefanía Losada, Quique Peinado, Nuria Roca, Amando Cabrero, Amador Moreno, Vanesa Pino, Juanjo Muñoz & Quique Sanz) (laSexta); Inés París, Guillermo Cisneros, Adriana Rivas, Carlos Asorey, Eduardo Zaramella — El accidente (Telecinco); Mariano Barroso, Alejandro Hernández — El día de mañana (Movistar+)	Best News Program: Al rojo vivo (laSexta); Antena 3 Noticias 1 (Antena3); La 2 noticias — La 2; Telediario 2 (La1)
Best Newscast Presenter: Vicente Vallés — Antena 3 Noticias 2 (Antena3); Antonio García Ferreras — Al rojo vivo (laSexta); Lourdes Maldonado — Telenoticias 1 (Telemadrid); Mònica López — El Tiempo (La1); Sandra Golpe — Antena 3 Noticias 1 (Antena3)	Best TV Host: Roberto Leal — Operación Triunfo (La1); David Broncano — La resistencia (#0/Movistar+); Iñaki López — laSexta noche (laSexta); Alberto Chicote — Pesadilla en la cocina (Antena3); Lara Álvarez — Survivor (Telecinco); Raquel Sánchez Silva — Maestros de la costura (La1); Susanna Griso — Espejo público (Antena3)
Best Production: Jaume Banacolocha, Joan Bas — Cathedral of the Sea (Antena3); Belén Giménez, Daniel Gariboti, Ramón Pellicer — Conquistadores: Adventvm (Movistar+); Elena Hortelano — Al rojo vivo: Especial 1 Oct: Objetivo Cataluña (laSexta); Macarena Rey, Begoña Rumeu — Maestros de la costura (La1); Survivor's production team (Telecinco); Josep Cister, Aitor Montánchez, Luis Santamaría, Mª Ángeles Caballero — A Different View (La1); Pablo Motos, Jorge Salvador — El hormiguero (Antena3)	Best TV Show: Operación Triunfo (La1); ¡Boom! (Antena3); Eso no se pregunta (Telemadrid); First Dates (Cuatro); MasterChef (La1); Survivor (Telecinco); Zapeando (laSexta)
Best TV Show produced for a theme channel: Alaska y Mario (Paramount Network España); Homo Zapping (Neox); Los años chanantes (Comedy Central España); Pool Fiction (Movistar+); Yo fui un asesino: El crimen de la catana (DMAX)	Best Camera Direction: Juan Carlos Carrasco & Luis Cachón — MasterChef; Fama, ¡a bailar!'s production team (#0/Movistar+); Joan Carles García Flores — Late Motiv (#0/Movistar+); María Zarazúa & crew —Zapeando (laSexta); Mónica Artigas San José — Ninja Warrior (Antena3); Seli Martínez — Mi casa es la tuya (Telecinco)
