= Javier Algarra =

Spanish journalist

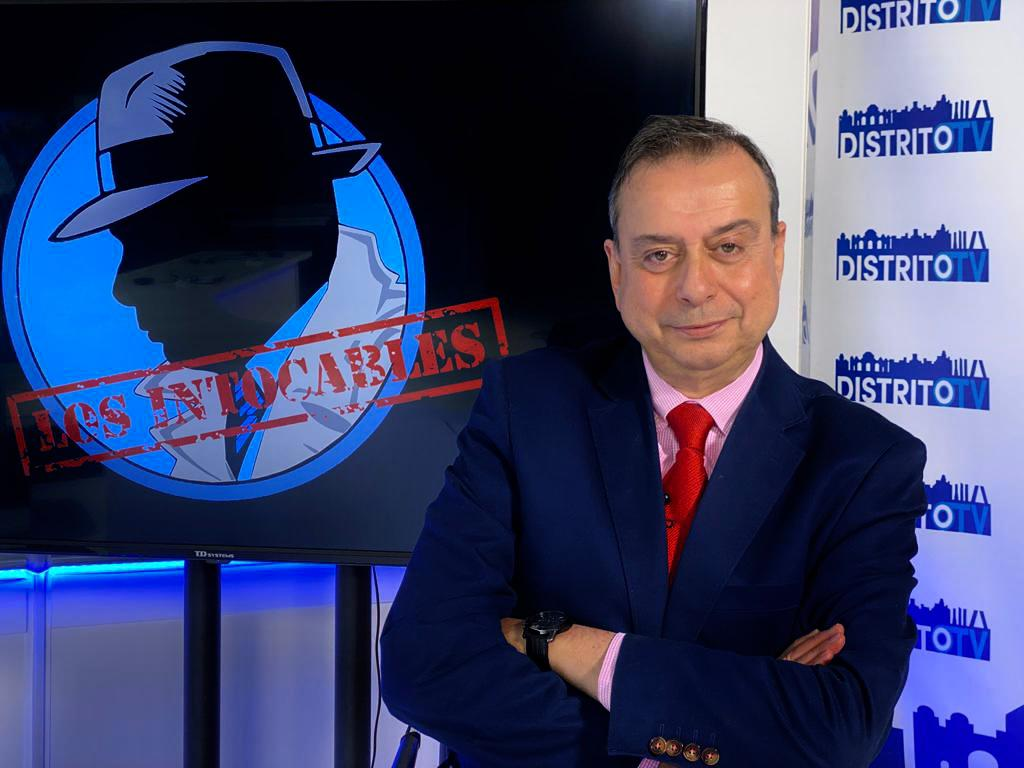
- Born: Javier Algarra Bonet; September 20, 1961; Barcelona Spain
- Occupation: News-director
- Years active: 1980–2018

Spanish journalist
- In office 1980–2016
- Website: Javier Algarra

Javier Algarra Bonet (Barcelona, September 20, 1961) is a Spanish journalist with the degree in Information Sciences of the Autonomous University of Barcelona. He has worked in Diario de Barcelona, Radio Nacional de España, Televisión Española, Onda Cero Radio, Antena 3 (Spanish TV channel), La Gaceta, Intereconomía Televisión, Radio Internacional, and Distrito Televisión.

== Career ==
Javier Algarra began his professional career at Diario de Barcelona in 1980 where he joined the RTVE in 1981. He was the news-director of RNE in Catalonia and the editor of TVE in San Cugat. In 1988, he moved to Madrid and worked as the coordinator and weekend news-director of RNE, the deputy director of the El Diario de las dos, and deputy director of the program Who knows where on TVE.

In 1992 he moved to London, where he was a correspondent in the United Kingdom and Ireland for RNE and collaborated with Interviú. He returned to Spain in 1992 as the executive director of the TVE News. In addition to directing the 3:00 p.m. Newscast, in the same position, he organized major operations such as the Ibero-American Summit on Isla Margarita (Venezuela), the NATO summit in Madrid, the Pope's trip to Cuba, and the Infanta's wedding.

Javier directed and presented various informative specials on TVE, such as the elections in France, the United Kingdom, and the United States, as well as the special edition for the death of Lady Di and Teresa of Calcutta.

In 1998 he joined Antena 3 as the executive director of Informativos, where he organized the development of correspondents and territorial centers in Catalonia, Valencia, Gran Canaria, Tenerife, Aragón, Galicia, Andalusia, the Balearic Islands, and Castilla y León. In that channel he directed the News 1 space, an informative program presented by Matías Prats and Susanna Griso.

In 1999 he was appointed as the General Director of News at Onda Cero, where he directed and presented the program La Brújula. He launched "ondacero.es", the first radio on demand in Europe.

In 2002 he was appointed as the News Director of Antenna 3. During his time as the director, the news programs of Antena 3 surpassed in audience for the first time in their history.

Later, as General Director of Lagunmedia, he directed the production of programs and development of corporate image for channels such as IB3 de Baleares, Veo Televisión, Neox, and Nova de Atresmedia.

In 2008 he was appointed as the Director of the Weekend News of Intereconomía Televisión. In 2010 he launched the Dando Caña program, which he presented for three years, until he was appointed as the director of El gato al agua in January 2013. He has written in Diario de Barcelona, Informaciones, Interviú, El Universo de Madrid, La Vanguardia, La Razón, Época and La Gaceta.

Algarra has frequently expressed his rejection of Catalan separatism, affirming that in the schools of Catalonia there is an indoctrination that has come to be compared with Nazism. Likewise, he has affirmed that he feels deeply Catalan and denies the accusation of being anti-Catalan.

In November 2016 he stopped presenting the political gathering of Intereconomía Televisión El gato al agua. Later, he directed and presented the Magazine Mundo Noticias on International Radio. Since 2018, he has been the director and presenter of the program Los Intocables, in Distrito Televisión.

== Awards ==
- Television Zapping Award 1998 (Catalonia), granted by Telespectadors Associats de Catalunya, as director of News 1 of Antena 3, for the best news program.
- Antena de Oro 1999 (National), as News Director of Onda Cero, granted by the Federation of Associations of Radio and Television Professionals of Spain.
- Antena de Oro 2000 (National), for the creation of "ondacero.es", the first on-demand radio portal in Europe, granted by the Federation of Associations of Radio and Television Professionals of Spain.
- Micrófono de Plata 2001 (Murcia), for his professional career, awarded by the Murcia Radio and Television Professionals Association.
- Antena de Oro 2002 (National), as news director of Antena 3, for the coverage of the World Cup in Japan and Korea, the first broadcast by a private TV channel, granted by the Federation of Associations of Radio and Television Professionals from Spain.
- Antena de Oro 2008 (National), as Director of Weekend News of Intereconomía Televisión, granted by the Federation of Associations of Radio and Television Professionals of Spain.
- 2009 City of Tarazona Award (Zaragoza), as News Director of Intereconomía Televisión and presenter of El gato al agua, awarded by the City Council of Tarazona (Zaragoza).
- Micrófono de Oro 2012 (National), as News Director of Intereconomía Televisión and presenter of the program Dando Caña. Delivered in Ponferrada by Luis del Olmo, Honorary President of the Federation of Associations of Radio and Television Professionals of Spain.
- As de Bastos Recognition Award 2013 (Madrid), as director of El gato al agua, delivered by the Mayor of Majadahonda (Madrid), Agustín de Foxá.
- Antena de Plata 2016 (Madrid), as director and presenter of El Gato al Agua, by Intereconomía Televisión, awarded by the Madrid Association of Radio and Television Professionals.

== Books ==
- Author of the book Prisionero en Cuba (Libros Libres, 2012).
- Co-author, together with Xavier Horcajo, from Sindicatos, SA, Toxo and Méndez, the mandarins of union capitalism (Sekotia, 2014).
- Author of the epilogue to Nos hurts Cataluña (Galland Books, 2014), by Begoña Marín, with a foreword by Albert Boadella and interviews with characters such as Jorge Fernández Díaz, Félix de Azúa, Rosa Mª Calaf, Javier Nart or Augusto Ferrer-Dalmau.
- Author of Maybe that's why they call us numbers (Eolas Ediciones, 2021), the novel winner of the APROGC Literary Contest Prize.O

== Other works ==
- Director of the Radio Area of the Master in Management of Audiovisual Media Ges-Media, CEU-San Pablo and Mediapark.
- Director of the Television Area of the Ges-Media Audiovisual Media Management Master, CEU-San Pablo and Mediapark.
- Professor of the Radio Master of the Rey Juan Carlos University.
- Professor of Communication, Crisis Communication and Spokesperson Training in various seminars organized by Inforpress.
- Lecturer at various universities.

== Assignments ==
- Knight of the Toledo Chapter of the Order of Knights of the Holy Sepulcher . Toledo, March 27, 2004.
- Knight of the Order of Rizal . Madrid, July 3, 2012.
- Knight of the Order of the Château de la Flor de Lys . Olmillos de Sasamón (Burgos), October 5, 2013.
- Medal for Professional Merit of the Order of Knight Custodians of Calatrava la Vieja. Carrión de Calatrava (Ciudad Real), October 5, 2019.
- Honorary Member of the Círculo Ahumada, Madrid, November 19, 2021.
