= María Rey =

Spanish journalist

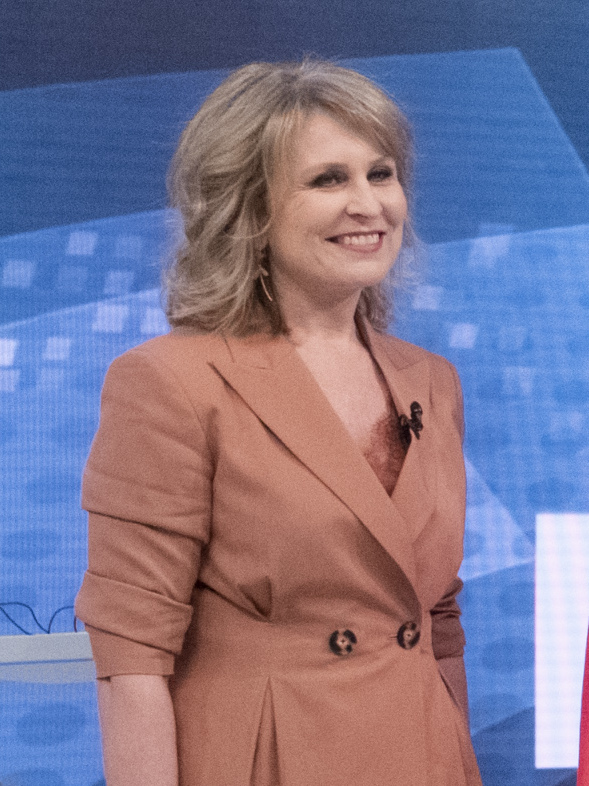
- Rey in 2019
- Born: María Mercedes Fernández Rey; 21 March 1967 (age 58); Tomiño, Pontevedra, Spain
- Occupation: Journalist
- Employer: Telemadrid
- Spouse: Manuel Campo Vidal (m. 1998)
- Children: 3

María Mercedes Fernández Rey (born 21 March 1967 in Tomiño, Pontevedra) is a Spanish journalist. She currently presents the news magazine 120 minutos on Telemadrid.

== Biography ==
Rey was born in Vigo on 21 March 1967 and lived in Tomiño (Province of Pontevedra), a town where her father, José Luis Fernández Lorenzo, was mayor until 2007, for the Partido Popular.

Graduating in journalism from the Complutense University of Madrid, she began her professional career in the local radio station of Cadena SER in her hometown. Parliamentary Responsible for Antena 3 Television and member of the Advisory Board of the Institute of Business Communication.

She then moved to television, when she was hired by TVE to be in charge of the news services of the Territorial Center of Madrid. After that, she joined the television department of Agencia Efe, until she was hired by Antena 3 in 1992.

On this channel she presented the Antena 3 Noticias weekend news program, together with Roberto Arce, and later the daily edition, with Pedro Piqueras until 1996.

From September 1996 to September 2016, she worked as a parliamentary correspondent on Antena 3 Noticias, carrying out her work in the Cortes Generales. From May 1996 to 2016, she chaired the Parliamentary Journalists Association. In June 2012, she started a blog, "Tiene la palabra", in the Spanish edition of Yahoo News. From 12 September 2016 to 28 July 2017, she worked as anchor and director of the news program Noticias 1, together with Sandra Golpe.

In June 2017, her book, Juego de escaños, about the serious credibility crisis in Spain's politics, was published.

Between September 2017 and March 2018, she was Diplomatic and Casa Real correspondent for Antena 3 Noticias.

In June 2018, after leaving Antena 3 she joined the staff of the regional channel Telemadrid to present, from 25 June 2018, the news programme 120 minutos. The program is broadcast from Monday to Friday, from 11:30 am to 2:05 pm.

== Personal life ==
She has been married since 24 July 1998 to journalist Manuel Campo Vidal. The couple has three children.

== Awards ==
- "Luis Carandell" Award for Parliamentary Journalism (2013).
- Antena de Plata TV Award (2019)
