= Lourdes Maldonado =

Spanish television journalist and newscaster

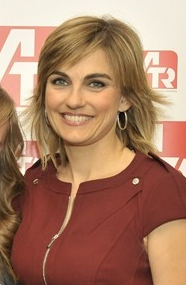
- Maldonado in 2013
- Born: María Lourdes Maldonado Alconada; 3 May 1973 (age 53); Irún, Guipúzcoa, Spain
- Occupation: Journalist
- Years active: 1997–present
- Spouse: José Guerrero
- Children: 2

María Lourdes Maldonado Alconada (born 3 May 1973) is a Spanish television journalist and newscaster. She worked for Antena 3 from 2000 to 2017, firstly as a journalist for Antena 3 Noticias and later as Head of Culture and Society. Maldonado was a newscaster for the local Madrid broadcaster Telemadrid's Telenoticias 1 afternoon news bulletin from September 2017 to September 2021. She has also worked for the news agency Agence France-Presse and has either won or been nominated for various journalistic awards.

== Biography ==
Maldonado was born in Irún, Guipúzcoa on 3 May 1973. She is the daughter of Ana María Alconada and José Maldonado Ferrer. Maldonado's extended family were educators and her great-grandfather has a street in Padul named for him. She had wanted to become a reading teacher for young nursery children, but she became interested in journalism after listening to radio bulletins.

After graduating from the University of Navarra in Pamplona with a journalism degree, Maldonado got onto the European Union's Erasmus Programme through the Ministry of Education to study Audiovisual Journalism at the University of Bordeaux, from which she graduated in 1996. She began her professional career conducting the half an hour local news broadcast for the local Irun television station Gipuzkoa Telebista Txingudi from 1997 to 2000, which she conducted in Basque, French and Spanish, and she also worked for Agence France-Presse as well as Onda Cero in Granada and Pamplona. Maldonado also infrequently appeared on Espejo público in place of Sonsoles Suárez during 2002.

In October 2000, Maldonado joined the Basque Country version of the broadcaster Antena 3 as a presenter of the news in the region, taking over from journalist Francisco Blanco Argibay. She began presenting the weekend Antena 3 Noticias Fin de Semana programme after being appointed to the position by Antena 3 Euskadi delegate Marisa Guerrero in September 2003. In some years, she replaced Matías Prats Luque on news bulletins he presented during the holiday season; she rejected an offer to present the daily morning weekday edition of Espejo público which launched in late 2006, because she wanted to spend more time with her family. She was replaced by Ramón Pradera and Miriam Sánchez between November 2005 and May 2006 and then by Sandra Golpe from November 2008 to May 2009 when she was on maternity leave during both periods of time. She has presented the Premio Planeta de Novela gala since 2007 and has appeared in commercial advertising since 2008. Maldonado appeared in an anti gender violence campaign, which was broadcast on Antena 3 in 2010.

Following nearly a decade as the presenter of Antena 3 Noticias' weekend news bulletins, Maldonado began presenting the 3:00 pm. daily bulletin with fellow journalist Vicente Vallés from 3 September 2012. She was appointed head of Antena 3 Noticias' Head of Culture and Society by the news director Santiago González to replace the journalist Enric Sumoy from 9 September 2016. In July 2017, she signed a contract to leave Antena 3 and join the local Madrid television broadcaster Telemadrid. Maldonado requested an leave of absence before she began presenting the afternoon news bulletin Telenoticias 1 from that September. She was impressed with the direction the news director Jon Ariztimuño wanted to take Telemadrid to and she began her role on 18 September alongside Diego Losada.

Although she was liked by Madrid audiences both on television and online which helped increase Telenoticias 1's ratings to record levels, she was terminated from her contract with Telemadrid by the news director José Antonio Sánchez and the administrator José Antonio Álvarez Gundín in August 2021. Maldonado made her last on-screen appearance as a newscaster for the channel on 3 September after four years with the network.

From 10 September 2022 to 1 September 2023, she co-hosted Hablando claro, a daily morning magazine show on La 1 of TVE, together with Marc Calderó. After this project ended, she moved to Radio Nacional de España, where from 4 September 2023 to 18 July 2025 she hosted Las tardes de RNE.

Since 6 September 2025, she has co-presented the Weekend News (Telediario Fin de Semana) with Marc Sala (except for the Saturday TD-FS2) as well as the current affairs program Informe Semanal.

== Personal life ==
She was diagnosed with Milroy's disease when she was in puberty, and the condition means she has poor circulation in her right leg. Maldonado is married to the journalist José Guerrero, with whom she has two children.

== Awards ==
Maldonado was nominated for the TP de Oro award in the Best News Presenter category in 2008, and she won both the 2010 Premios Zapping Best Presenter accolade and a television award from the Federación de Asociaciones de Radio y Televisión at the 2010 Antena de Oro ceremony. She was voted to receive the Agrupación de Telespectadores y Radioyentes' award for Best News Presenter for her work in Noticias Fin de Semana on Antena 3 in May 2012.

Maldonado was voted the winner of the Best Presenter of Regional Programs Autonomous Iris Award by the Consejo de la Academia de las Ciencias y las Artes de Televisión in both 2018 and 2020. She also received a nomination for the Best News Presenter Award at the 20th National Iris Awards. Maldonado collected the "Vinos Ojos del Guadiana" cultural accolade "for her great professionalism throughout her extensive career as an audiovisual communicator" from the El Progreso cooperative at Villarrubia de los Ojos in February 2020.
