= Mónica Carrillo =

Spanish journalist and television presenter

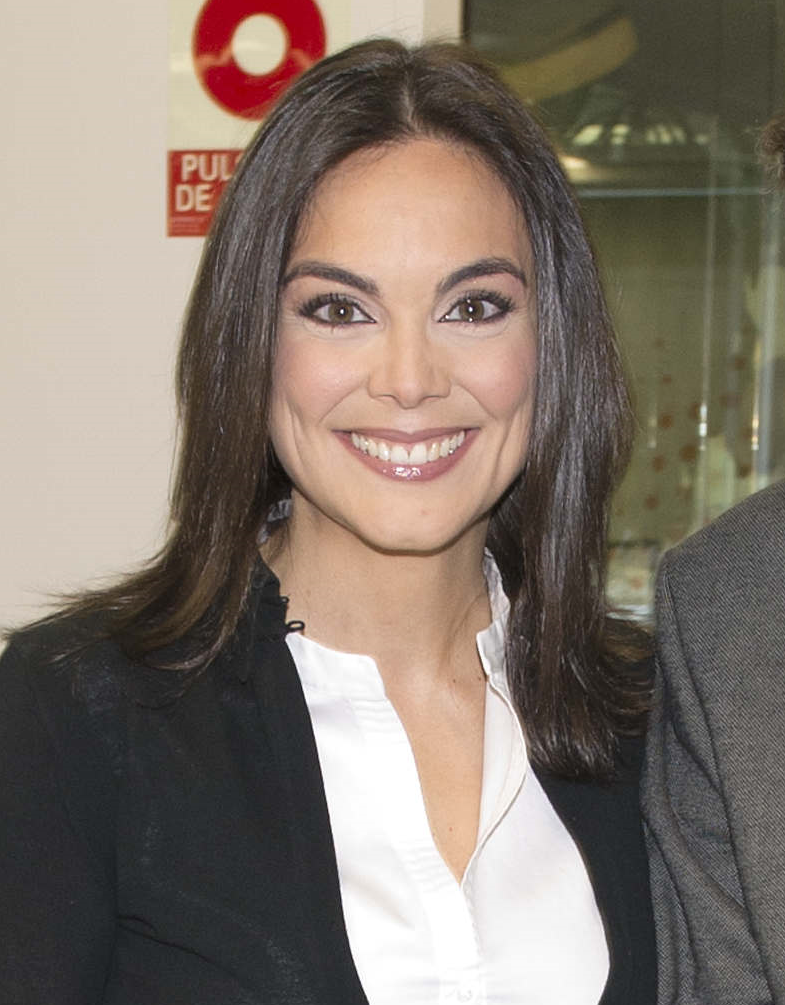
- Born: Mónica Carrillo Martínez; September 16, 1976 (age 49); Elche, Alicante
- Occupation: Journalist
- Years active: 2000–present
- Employers: Televisión Española; Antena 3 Noticias
- Website: monicacarrillo.es

Mónica Carrillo Martínez (born 16 September 1976) is a Spanish journalist and writer who works for Antena 3 on its Antena 3 Noticias news bulletins. She has worked for Televisión Española on the 24 horas rolling news channel, co-founded the PSOE Media Monitoring Office, and has read the news on Antena 3 Noticias since 2006. Carrillo has broadcast on the radio stations Europa FM and Onda Cero. She is the author of four books and was voted the winner of the Premio Azorín accolade in 2020.

== Biography ==
On 16 September 1976, Carrillo was born in Elche, Alicante, Spain. Most of her family originate from Murcia and she has one brother. Carrillo was brought up in Elche. Nobody in her family had either studied or worked in journalism. At first, she left Elche to study for a career in architecture and a diploma in tourism at the University of Alicante. In 2000, Carrillo graduated with a degree in journalism from the Charles III University of Madrid and she also studied English, French and German following a year of studying in Munich on the Erasmus Mundus programme.

The studies enabled her to begin her career in the media, working as an intern at EFE Radio as a newsreader, voice-over and writer for over a single year. Carrillo began working in the national news section of the state broadcaster Televisión Española (RTVE) on a scholarship for a three-month period in mid-2000, doing the day's first and second news bulletins presented by Ana Blanco and Alfredo Urdaci. As a result of her interest in the media and national politics, she was part of a group of journalists who established the PSOE Media Monitoring Office. Following a period working for the PSOE Media Monitoring Office, Carrillo returned to working in national television from July 2001 in a writing role. She rejoined RTVE as an editor of the economics section of the rolling news channel 24 horas and she was a collaborator on the programme Mercados y Negocios. In mid-2004, Carrillo led the presentation and writing team of the stock market information programme Telediario Matinal. She went on to become a member of the team that presented the flagship international Spanish-language news programme Diario América from September 2004 on the TVE Internacional channel. She received a large enough audience to enable her to with the chance to do similar formats.

She left public broadcasting television, and joined the Antena 3 Noticias team in December 2006. Carrillo read the news on the morning bulletin Noticias de la Mañana with Luis Fraga Pombo and Mónica Martínez as well as infrequently reading the news at weekends in place of Lourdes Maldonado. From September 2008, she presented the 9:00 p.m news bulletin Antena 3 Noticias 2 with Matías Prats Luque. Starting from September 2009, Carrillo and Roberto Arce co-read the Antena 3 Noticias 1 news bulletin broadcast at 3:00 pm. In 2011, she rejected an offer of a contract from the Italian businessperson Paolo Vasile to join his Spanish-owned Telecinco network as co-presenter of the weekend news bulleting on the channel alongside José Ribagorda and in place of Carme Chaparro, who was pregnant. Carrillo thus continued to present Antena 3 Noticias 1 with Vicente Vallés until 2012 and then read the Antena 3 Noticias 2 bulletin with Prats from 3 September 2012. She was a guest on the episode El que mucho abarca poco aprieta for the comedy programme La hora de José Mota in 2012. Carrillo began collaborating with Javier Limón on the new Europa FM radio show Un Lugar Llamado Mundo on 25 June 2013.

She was transferred co-reading the Noticias Fin de Semana with Prats broadcast at 9:00 pm starting on 9 September 2014, and she began collaborating with Juan Ramón Lucas and Carlos Alsina Álvarez on the Onda Cero radio programme Más de uno as the current affairs correspondent in September 2016. Carrillo joined the team that presented the LaSexta programme En busca de la longevidad in which she travelled to Japan to discuss the Asian nation and the science world. She was selected to promote the Gallina Blanca brand on television until December 2017. Carrillo participated in the first series of the singing competition Mask Singer: Adivina quién canta as a guest masked singer on its third episode, performing Adele's song Someone Like You to "break down mental walls".

She also began a career in writing through authoring micro-stories on Twitter and had considered writing stories with more than 140 characters. In 2014, Carrillo published her first novel, La Luz de Candela. Her second novel, Olvidé decirte quiero, was published two years later. In 2017, Carrillo published a complication book of Twitter micro-stories called El tiempo Todo Locura. She published her third novel, La vida desnuda, in 2020.

== Personal life ==
She was in a relationship with the singer Vanesa Martín Mata from 2019 until 2022. Carillo mainly keeps her private life discreet from the public and is shy. In 2020, she was diagnosed with the skin cancer basal cell carcinoma on her nose that was later removed with precision surgery.

== Awards ==
In both 2009 and 2017, Carrillo won the TP de Oro award for the best news programme on Antena 3 Noticias. Carrillo received the Antena de Oro award in the television section from the Federation of Radio and Television Associations of Spain at the 2017 ceremony. She was voted the winner of the 2020 Premio Azorín accolade by the Provincial Council of Alicante and the publishing house Planeta Group for her novel La vida desnuda and attended the ceremony under the pseudonym Martina Suárez.
