= Matías Prats =

Matías Prats may refer to:

- Matías Prats Cañete (1913-2004), Spanish journalist and newscaster
- Matías Prats Luque (born 1952), Spanish journalist, newscaster, and son of the above
- Matías Prats Chacón (born 1985), Spanish journalist and son of the above
