= Roberto Arce =

Spanish journalist

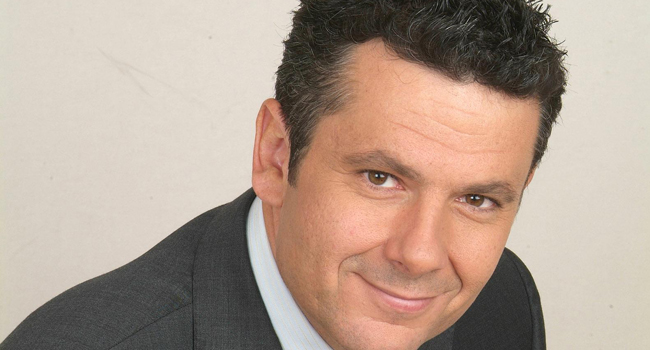
- Born: Roberto Arce Vilardebó; 5 December 1965 (age 60); Madrid, Spain
- Occupation: Journalist
- Years active: 1989–present
- Employers: Antena 3; (1989–2011); Cuatro; (2011–present)
- Spouse: Cristina de Vicente Rodríguez

Roberto Arce Vilardebó (Madrid, December 5, 1964), better known as Roberto Arce, is a Spanish journalist and television presenter.

== Biography ==
He is the son of publicist Roberto Arce (1923–1995) and artist Montserrat Vilardebó. He has been married since 1993 to publicist Cristina de Vicente Rodríguez, with whom he has 3 children: Diego (1995); Candela (1997) and Natalia (1999).

=== Home ===
He studied journalism at the Complutense University of Madrid and began his professional career in 1987, working at EFE.

A year later, he made the jump to Radio España, where he was editor, political correspondent and head of international news.

=== Antena 3 ===
In 1989 he joined Antena 3, where he has been assistant director and presenter of several news programs, as well as special envoy in the Gulf War, (1990–1991) and the Bosnian War (1992–1995).

He was in front of the cameras of Antena 3 Noticias between 1992 and 1997. Presenting the weekend edition, first with María Rey, until 1993 and then alone until 1997.

In 1996, again with María Rey and this time, at noon, they replaced Olga Viza from June 1 to September 13 of that year.

In 1997, he presented the program Situación de emergencia and in 1998 he replaced Pedro Piqueras at the head of Espejo Público, a program he also directed since November 2000, where he remained until September 2002, when he was replaced by Sonsoles Suárez, daughter of former Prime Minister Adolfo Suárez.

In 2002, he was in charge of Buenos días, España with Marta Cáceres and Soledad Arroyo, and later, he directed and presented Noticias de la mañana, which he presented with Lydia Balenciaga.

In May 2004, he began presenting La Respuesta, replacing Pedro Piqueras.

In September 2004, he moved to the afternoon news, hosting the newscast with Susanna Griso; from September 6, 2004 to December 1, 2006, and two years later he made it the leading midday newscast, surpassing TVE's Telediario, presented by Ana Blanco and leader at the time.

The leadership of Antena 3 Noticias 1 consolidated the success of this channel's news program, which after taking over the leadership of the prime time edition with Matías Prats, the previous season and, subsequently, the midday edition with Susanna Griso and Roberto Arce, made Antena 3 the absolute leader in television news in Spain.

It thus became the only private European channel to surpass the number of viewers of the public channel, in this case TVE, a fact that would last until 2007.

Between December 11, 2006 and August 28, 2009, his news partner was Pilar Galán, who replaced Susanna Griso, who took over the new Espejo Público- and between August 31, 2009 and June 28, 2011, Mónica Carrillo.

From 2007 to 2008, he was in charge of the weekly debate 360 grados.

=== Mediaset ===
After 22 years at Antena 3, on June 29, 2011, it was announced that he had joined Mediaset España to present and direct, first alone and since September 3, 2012, together with Mónica Sanz, the second edition of Noticias Cuatro until October 5, 2013.

From October 7, 2013 to August 2014, he leads a structure aimed at creating investigative reports and special coverage.

Since September 2014 and until the cancellation of Noticias Cuatro fin de semana, he presented and edited this newscast with Marta Reyero.

Since February 2019, he has been editing and presenting Cuatro al día fin de semana with Marta Reyero.

Since September 2014, he has hosted the docureality Amores que duelen.

From May 2016 until July of that year, on Cuatro, he presented the documentary Esclavas: que hay detrás de la prostitución broadcast on late night.

== Television ==
| Date | Program | Channel |
|---|---|---|
| 1992–1997 | Antena 3 Noticias fin de semana | Antena 3 |
| 1997 | Situación de Emergencia | Antena 3 |
| 1998–2002 | Espejo Público | Antena 3 |
| 2002–2003 | Buenos días, España | Antena 3 |
| 2003–2004 | Las noticias de la mañana | Antena 3 |
| 2004 | La respuesta | Antena 3 |
| 1996–2004, 2011 | Antena 3 Noticias 1 | Antena 3 |
| 2007–2008 | 360 grados | Antena 3 |
| 2011–2013 | Noticias Cuatro 2 | Cuatro |
| 2014–2019 | Noticias Cuatro fin de semana | Cuatro |
| 2014 – present | mores que duelen | Telecinco |
| 2016 | Esclavas: que hay detrás de la prostitución | Cuatro |
| 2019 – present | Cuatro al día fin de semana | Cuatro |

== Awards ==
- Antena de Oro 2001
- Antena de Oro 2007
