= Esther Vaquero =

Spanish television presenter (born 1982)

- Born: Esther Vaquero Hernández; 7 February 1982 (age 44); Salamanca, Spain
- Occupation: Television presenter

Esther Vaquero Hernández (Salamanca, 7 February 1982) is a Spanish journalist and presenter.

== Biography ==
She graduated in journalism from the Pontifical University of Salamanca in 2005. Her career has been developed mainly in radio (Cadena SER) and television (Antena 3, Telecinco, Cuatro, TVE, BBC London and La Sexta), although during her university years she did internships in two Salamanca newspapers: El Adelanto de Salamanca (now defunct), La Gaceta de Salamanca y and in the newsroom of Informativos Telecinco in Madrid.

After graduating, she briefly worked for Cadena SER (La Ventana) and that same year, in 2005, she joined the team of the program Noche Hache (produced by Globomedia for Cuatro). The program combined current affairs and humor in a late-night format, and the team won an Ondas Award in 2007.

She joined the team of La Sexta Noticias in 2008 and stayed there until 2009, when she received a collaboration grant from the prestigious English television channel BBC. During her time working in London, she was in charge of covering local news on BBC London.

She has also been a reporter for TVE and Las Mañanas de Cuatro by Concha García Campoy. Since 2010, she has been working a Antena 3. From 2010 until 2012, she was part of the current affairs and investigation teams of Espejo público and Antena 3 Noticias.

In September 2012, the network entrusted her with the presentation of its morning news alongside María José Sáez.

In Christmas 2014, she made her debut presenting Espejo público, replacing Susanna Griso, with good results in terms of critics and audiences, and until 2018 she combined it with her work at the head of Antena 3 Noticias. She returned to present Espejo público at Easter, summer and Christmas 2015, surpassing TVE every morning and disputing the leadership with Telecinco. Her participation in the program gradually increased until July 2016, when she was absent due to the final stages of her pregnancy.

On 7 December 2015, she presented, together with Ana Pastor and Vicente Vallés, El Debate decisivo between Pedro Sánchez, Albert Rivera, Pablo Iglesias and Soraya Sáenz de Santamaría, in the run-up to the general elections of 20 December. The program, produced by Atresmedia, was the most watched of 2015: it got more than 48% of the vote and brought together more than 9 million viewers in front of the screen.

Tras la baja por su primera maternidad, volvió el 2 de enero de 2017 a los informativos, esta vez a Antena 3 Noticias 1, junto a Ángel Carreira durante el período de Navidad.

After her first maternity leave, she returned to the news on 2 January 2017, this time to Antena 3 Noticias 1, alongside Ángel Carreira during the Christmas season, and on 6 February, she returned to Las Noticias de la Mañana alongside Mara José Sáez.During the first two weeks of July 2017, she presented the morning news alone on the channel, from 6:15 to 8:55, with remarkable audience records. During the month of August, she took over the program Espejo público again, replacing Susanna Griso (since Sandra Golpe did the same during the last two weeks of July), thus returning to present the news magazine after a year. On 4 September and coinciding with the new season of Antena 3 noticias, she leaves Las noticias de la mañana and goes on to present, together with Vicente Vallés, the 21:00 news program, Antena 3 Noticias 2.

In the Christmas of 2017–2018, she returned to present Espejo público replacing Susanna Griso.

In February 2018, Antena 3 Noticias announced the launch of a new program that she presents under the name Nos Importa. It is an Antena 3 initiative that addresses issues of special relevance in the social context and that need to be explained in all their complexity and in a close, understandable way that allows viewers to see themselves reflected in each case. Thus, for each issue addressed in Nos importa, a campaign is developed with content on television, radio, the web, and Atresmedia networks. Each Nos importa campaign culminates with a programming event in prime time on Antena 3: the broadcast of a film or documentary followed by a debate led by the Antena 3 Noticias team and moderated by Esther Vaquero.

In February 2018, she presented a special debate in the late night of Antena 3 on the occasion of what happened as a result of the publication of the book Fariña. On the occasion of the wedding between Prince Harry and Meghan Markle on 19 May 2018, she presented a special program on the website of Hola magazine.

On 23 April 2019, she was in charge of presenting the pre and post programs of El Debate Decisivo, on Antena 3. On 28 April 2019, she was one of the presenters of the Special Election Night on Antena 3.

After being absent for a few months to give birth to her second daughter, Vaquero rejoined Antena 3 Noticias in April 2020, in full confinement, to present several specials on the coronavirus, in addition to her usual role co-presenting Antena 3 Noticias 2 at 9 pm with Vicente Vallés, where she has been since then. Since August 2020, when Esther Vaquero presented it by herself, the news show has had the most viewers of any show at that time.

== Awards ==
- Ondas Aeards
  - In 2007 as best entertainment program.
- Iris Awards
  - In 2014, as best current affairs magazine.
- Voz Própolis Award
  - In 2015, as best female voice on television.
- Antena de Plata
  - In June 2016, she received the Antena de Plata in the television category.
