= Sandra Golpe =

Spanish journalist (born 1974)

- Born: Sandra Golpe Cantalejo; 19 June 1974 (age 51); Cádiz, San Fernando, Spain
- Occupation: Journalist
- Years active: 1990s–present
- Children: 1

Sandra Golpe Cantalejo (born 19 June 1974) is a Spanish journalist working on the Antena 3 Noticias television programme broadcast on Antena 3. She began her journalistic career interning at the local newspaper Diario de Cádiz before working for local television broadcaster Canal 7 and then for Cadena COPE as a weekend editor, producer and reporter.

Golpe worked at the rolling news channel CNN+ from February 1999 to October 2008. She began reading the news on weekdays for Antena 3 Noticias in October 2008 before moving to Antena 3 Noticias Fin de Semana in September 2012. She has solo presented the Antena 3 Noticias 1 weekday news bulletin since September 2017.

== Early life ==
On 19 June 1974, Golpe was born in Cádiz, San Fernando. Her mother and maternal family came from Puerto Real, and her paternal grandfather, a Galician, served in the military. Golpe was raised in Cádiz and was educated at a school in Marín as well as at Colegio Grazalema in El Puerto de Santa María.

As she liked journalism and did not relish the option of broadcasting on radio, she decided not to attend the University of Seville, and instead studied journalism at the University of Navarra before she earned a Master's degree in Audiovisual Journalism from the Instituto de Especialistas en Periodismo Audiovisual.

== Career ==
Golpe began her journalistic career interning at the office of the local newspaper Diario de Cádiz based in Puerto Real while doing her studies. She helped to form Vía Digital in 1997, doing production tasks in the platform's self-promotion department. Golpe went on to work at Cadena COPE as an editor, producer and reporter during the weekends in 1998, and she also began doing advertising publicity voice-overs for a range of companies as well as presenting musical and news programmes on the local television broadcaster Canal 7 because she need to earn more money so she could pay for the expenses for her residence.

In February 1999, she joined the self-promotion department of the rolling news channel CNN+, going through various other departments to work as a broadcaster and copier. To celebrate the fifth anniversary of CNN+'s launch, Golpe presented the Globalización XXI programme talking about the environment, global initiatives and sustainability. In late 2008, she received a telephone call from Antena 3 and accepted to join the broadcaster as a newsreader after some deliberation. Golpe began her role presenting the weekday morning news bulletin for Antena 3 Noticias on 1 October 2008. She also presented the weekend bulletins alongside Ramón Pradera when Lourdes Maldonado was on maternity leave. Golpe has also presented the programme Espejo público when regular presenter Susanna Griso was on holiday. From September 2009, she presented Antena 3 Noticias' morning news bulletin alongside María Rey.

Golpe was asked to present the Antena 3 Noticias Fin de Semana weekend bulletin alongside Álvaro Zancajo starting from September 2012. Between September 2014 and July 2016, she read the news on the programme's second edition broadcast at 9:00 pm each weekend evening. Golpe joined the newspaper La Razón as a columnist in May 2016 and contributes to the Más de uno radio programme broadcast by Onda Cero. Since 4 September 2017, she has presented Antena 3 Noticias 1 news bulletin solo on weekdays after Antena 3 Noticias news director Santiago González formed a team around her to do the weekday broadcast. She presented the August 2021 edition of football's Ramón de Carranza Trophy at the Nuevo Mirandilla stadium.

== Personal life ==
She has a son from a former relationship with David Tejera. Golpe practises abstention. In October 2020, Golpe revealed that she had been sexually assaulted and held at knifepoint at her neck by an unknown man in an elevator two decades earlier, in 2000.

== Awards ==
She won an Antena de Plata award in the television category from the Federation of Radio and Television Associations of Spain in 2011, and she received further recognition from the association seven years later. Golpe was named the recipient of the Andalusian Image Award in the communication category during the 2016 ceremony. She was nominated for the Iris Award for Best Newscast Presenter every year from 2018 to 2021 for her work on Antena 3 Noticias 1. In 2019, Golpe was awarded the 'Hugo Ferrer' Communication Award as "the most relevant journalist of the year" in recognition of "her daily work at the head of the leading national news agency in her time slot."
