= Juan Pablo Colmenarejo =

Spanish journalist (1967–2022)

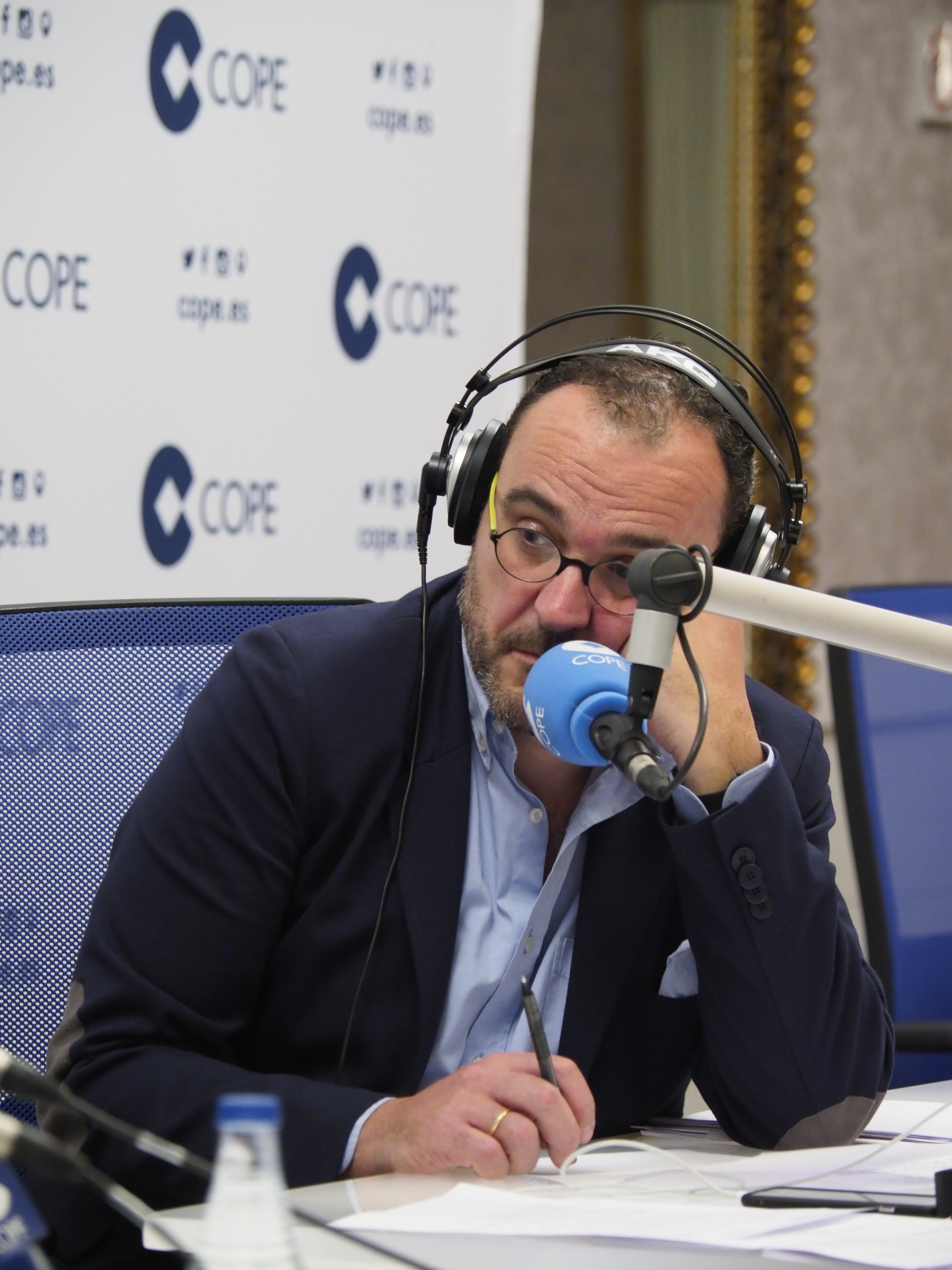
- Colmenarejo in 2018
- Born: Juan Pablo Colmenarejo Pérez; 17 September 1967; Madrid, Spain
- Died: 23 February 2022 (aged 54); Madrid, Spain
- Education: University of Navarra
- Occupation: Journalist
- Employer(s): Cadena COPE (2009–2022); Onda Cero (2002–2009); Onda Madrid (2018–2022)
- Notable work: La linterna La brújula Buenos días Madrid

Juan Pablo Colmenarejo Pérez (17 September 1967 – 23 February 2022) was a Spanish radio journalist. He also worked in print and television.

== Biography ==
Born in Madrid, Spain, Colmenarejo graduated in Information Sciences from the University of Navarre in 1990. He began working on Radio Nacional de España (RNE) in Pamplona before moving back to his city to work for Cadena COPE for seven years. He presented Infomativo Mediodía from 1995 to 1998. He then moved to Televisión Española and returned to RNE before in 2002, joining Onda Cero to present La brújula.

Colmenarejo returned to Cadena COPE in 2009, where he presented La linterna, while also writing a blog El grafitero for La Razón. In 2012, he was teaching at his alma mater and a master's degree in journalism at the Universidad CEU San Pablo in Madrid, as well as writing for El Mundo.

In the final four years of his life he presented Buenos días Madrid on Onda Madrid, while also writing a weekly column in ABC. He died from a stroke in Madrid, on 23 February 2022, at the age of 54.

His work was rewarded with awards including an Antena de Plata in 2019, an Antena de Oro in 2004 for La brújula, and a Micrófono de Oro in 2010.
