= Xavier Valiño =

Spanish writer & journalist (born 1965)

- Xavier Valiño García
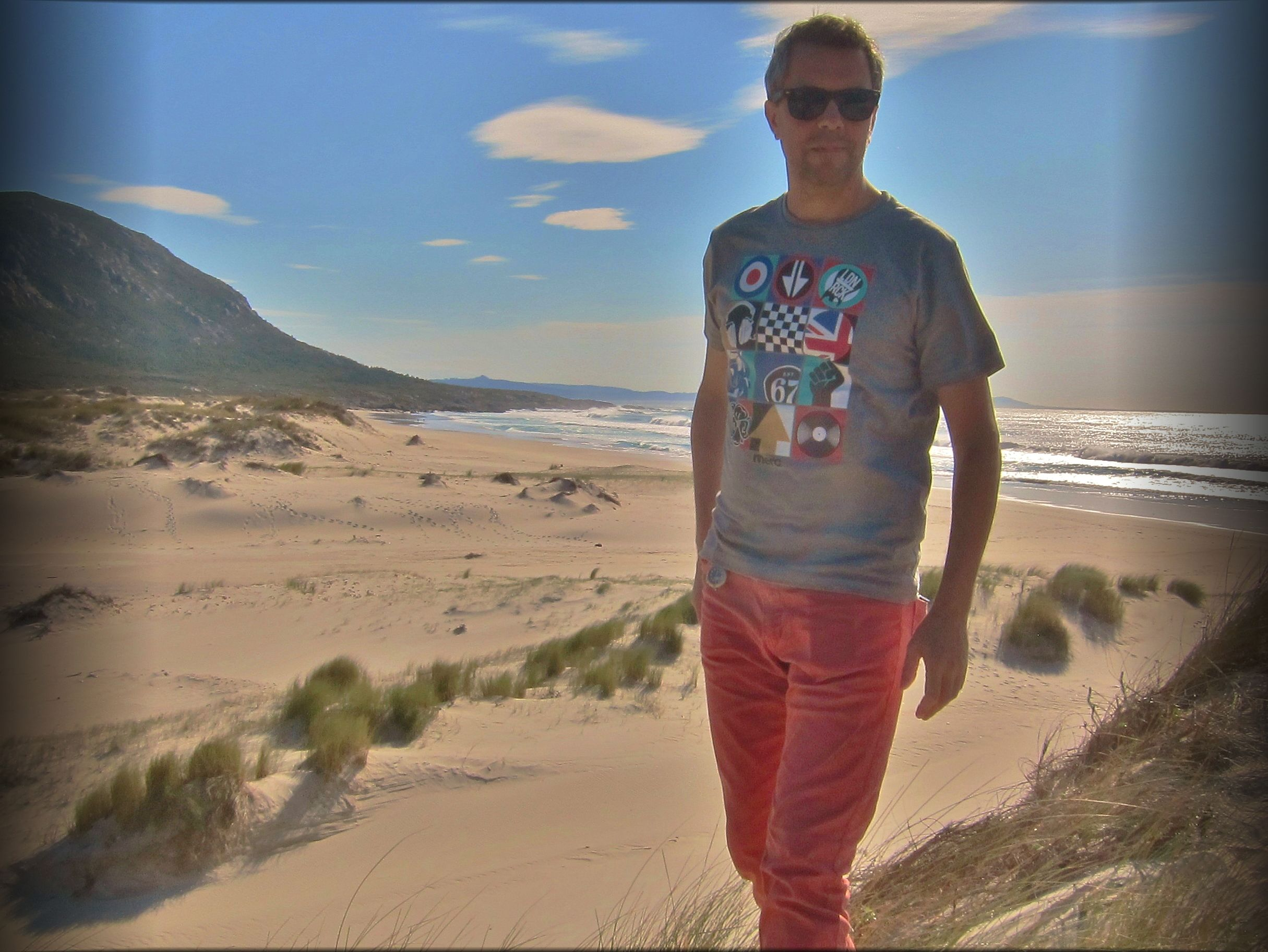
- Born: 4th of November; Cospeito, Terra Chá, Galicia, Spain
- Education: Doctorate: Political science (University of Santiago de Compostela); Master: Public administration (Complutense University of Madrid)
- Occupations: Writer, journalist
- Years active: From 1978
- Website: https://www.ultrasonica.info/

Xavier Valiño García (Cospeito, November 4th) is a Spanish writer, and music journalist specializing in rock and pop music. He contributes to various Spanish media outlets, covering music, film, and travel. He is the author of numerous books on music and popular culture, including Veneno en dosis camufladas. La censura en los discos de pop-rock durante el franquismo (Milenio, 2005). Some of his early work focuses on the censorship of pop-rock during Francoist Spain.

== Media collaborations ==
Radio

In 1978, Xavier Valiño recorded his first radio program Paso a la Juventud, on Radio Popular de Lugo. From 1984 to 1988, he co-hosted Revolution on Radio Mercurio in Madrid with Miguel Baz. He later hosted shows on Radio Oleiros, Radio Medellín, Radio Galega (Estudio 3, Ultrasónica), Xtraradio (Placeres Ocultos), Inolvidable FM (Pase Privado) and Efe Eme (Faro do Norte). In the summer 2024, he joined Las tardes de RNE on Radio Nacional de España, presenting influential women in global music, featuring artists such as Sade, Françoise Hardy, Astrud Gilberto, Cathy Claret, Lauryn Hill, and Yma Sumac.

Television

Xavier Valiño has appeared on Televisión de Galicia programs including Miraxes, Zigzag, and Planeta Cine, and served as a scriptwriter and host for Banda Curta on the same channel.

Print Media

Since 1983, he has written for newspapers such as El Diario Vasco, La Voz de Galicia, La Provincia, Santiago Siete, El Correo Gallego, Galicia Hoxe, and El Progreso. He has also contributed to university journals like ECUUS and Enclave Universitario.

From 1990 onward, his bylines have appeared in Spanish music magazines including Ruta 66, Mondo Sonoro, Zona de Obras, Efe Eme, Ritmos del Mundo, and others, as well as Galician magazines such as Sónica, Distrito Son, Wah-Wah, Iguana, and Compostelán.

Websites

Valiño runs several specialized music websites:

- Ultrasónica: Featuring his published articles since 1983. Named Best Music Website by Santiago Siete in 2010.
- Similar Rock: Explores notable similarities and alleged plagiarism between songs.
- Veneno en Dosis Camufladas: Focused on censorship in pop-rock during Francoism, linked to his book of the same name.

Musical Research and Curation

Xavier Valiño has presented at music research conferences in Spain, Colombia, and Brazil, including the International Seminar on Forbidden Music and the International Congress of Rock Studies. He also curated the exhibition Vibraciones Prohibidas, on music censorship under Franco’s regime, shown in Barcelona, Santiago de Compostela, and Las Palmas de Gran Canaria.

Film and Cultural Events

He has coordinated music documentary cycles for festivals such as Cineuropa (Docs. Music, 2006–2016), WOMAD (Escenas de un Planeta Sonoro), and Cinezín (Secuencias de Acordes), and co-leads Encuentros en el Mal in Santa Cruz de Tenerife and Blow-Up in Santiago de Compostela.

Other Activities

Xavier Valiño has hosted WOMAD festival stages, DJed under the name Dr. Wampush, exhibited his live concert photography, and worked as a travel writer across Europe, the Americas, Africa, and Asia.

Awards

In 2022, he was awarded the Pop Eye National Music and Arts Award for Best Music Book for Los 100 Mejores Documentales del Rock.

== Books ==
He is the author of the following books:

- Valiño, Xavier (1999, reissued on 2012). Rock bravú. Xerais. ISBN 978-84-8302-367-9.
- Valiño, Xavier (2005, reissued on 2015). El gran circo del rock: Anécdotas, curiosidades y falsos mitos. T&B. ISBN 978-84-96576-00-1.
- Valiño, Xavier (2008, reissued on 2011). Retratos Pop: Conversaciones y entrevistas con... T&B. ISBN 978-84-96576-85-8.
- Valiño, Xavier (2010). La censura en la producción fonográfica de la música pop. Universidad de Santiago de Compostela. ISBN 978-84-9887-591-1.
- Valiño, Xavier (2011). Veneno en dosis camufladas. La censura en los discos de pop-rock durante el franquismo. Milenio. ISBN 978-84-9743-481-2.
- Valiño, Xavier (2016). Elvis Costello, el hombre que pudo reinar. 66 rpm. ISBN 978-84-945330-3-7.
- Valiño, Xavier (2016). La cara oculta de la luna. Las 50 portadas esenciales del rock. Milenio. ISBN 978-84-9743-744-8.
- Valiño, Xavier (2018). Escenas olvidadas. La historia oral de Golpes Bajos. Efe Eme. ISBN 978-84-95749-22-2.
- Valiño, Xavier (2019). Líneas paralelas. 50 portadas esenciales del rock. Milenio. ISBN 978-84-9743-882-7.
- Valiño, Xavier (2021). Las 100 mejores películas del rock. Efe Eme. ISBN 978-84-95749-42-0.
- Valiño, Xavier (2022). Los 100 mejores documentales del rock. Efe Eme. ISBN 978-84-95749-44-4.
- Valiño, Xavier (2024). Rumours. La tormenta emocional de Fleetwood Mac. Efe Eme. ISBN 978-84-95749-63-5.
- Valiño, Xavier (2026). Trek to Everest Base Camp. A practical guide to planning your trip, including possible routes, stages and all the necessary information. Faro do Norte. Ebook ISBN 978-84-09-89254-9, Paperback ISBN 979-8-185-49543-8, Hardcover ISBN 979-8-185-49907-8.
