= Estoy vivo =

TV series

- Official poster (Season 1)
- Genre: Crime fiction; Supernatural fiction
- Created by: Daniel Écija
- Starring: Javier Gutiérrez; Anna Castillo; Alejo Sauras
- Country of origin: Spain
- Original language: Spanish
- No. of seasons: 4
- No. of episodes: 52

Production
- Production companies: RTVE; Globomedia; Good Mood

Original release
- Network: La 1
- Release: 7 September 2017 – 9 June 2021

Estoy vivo is a Spanish crime television series with supernatural and comedy elements. Created by Daniel Écija and produced by RTVE in collaboration with Globomedia and Good Mood, it premiered on 7 September 2017 on La 1. Its fourth season premiered on 10 March 2021.

== Premise ==
Andrés Vargas (Roberto Álamo), a police officer, dies during the pursuit of a serial killer. Given a second chance, he comes back to life, but 5 years after his death is incarnated into the body of another police officer, Manuel Márquez (Javier Gutiérrez). He teams up with Vargas' daughter Susana (Anna Castillo), who does not suspect Márquez's real identity, and with 'El Enlace' (Alejo Sauras) in facing the killer, who has resumed their activity.

The show is set in Vallecas, Madrid, though other locations of the Spanish capital also appear in the series.

== Cast ==
First season

- Javier Gutiérrez as Manuel Márquez.
- Anna Castillo as Susana.
- Alfonso Bassave as David Aranda.
- Alejo Sauras as El Enlace.
- Cristina Plazas as Laura.
- Zorion Eguileor as Arturo.
- Fele Martínez as Óscar Santos.
- Goizalde Núñez as María.
- Jesús Castejón as Sebastián Rey.
- Lucía Caraballo as Bea.
- Mon Ceballos as El Carnicero de Medianoche.
- Roberto Álamo as Andrés Vargas.
- Julia Gutiérrez Caba as the zone's director (special collaboration).

Introduced in season 2

- Luz Valdenebro as Lola.
- Artur Busquets as Palacios.
- Ana Marzoa.
- Laura Quirós as Ángela.

Introduced in season 3

- Aitana Sánchez-Gijón as Verónica.
- Jan Cornet as Adrián.
- Laia Manzanares as Carlota.
- Lelé Guillén as Alicia.
- Irene Rojo as Rebe.

Introduced in season 4

- Guiomar Puerta as Adriana.
- Almagro San Miguel as Mikel.
- Pablo Vázquez as Landa.

== Production and release ==
Filming of the first season began in June 2017 in Madrid.

The first episode was aired on La 1 on 7 September 2017.

In December 2017, Amazon purchased the rights for the distribution of the series in Spain and Latin America as part of its SVoD service.

The renovation of the series for a second season was announced in December 2017.

The renovation for a third season was confirmed in April 2019.

The fourth season was confirmed in February 2020. Filming was wrapped up in February 2021. Comprising 13 episodes, it premiered on 10 March 2021.

Series	Episodes	Originally released			Average viewership	Share (%)	Ref.
Series	Episodes	First released	Last released	Network	Average viewership	Share (%)	Ref.
1	13	7 September 2017	14 December 2017	tve	2,163,000	14.1	
2	13	25 September 2018	17 December 2018	tve	1,769,000	11.4	
3	13	26 September 2019	19 December 2019	tve	1,388,000	9.2	
4	13	10 March 2021	9 June 2021	tve	961,000	5.9	

=== Season 1 ===
This is a caption
No. overall	No. in season	Title	Viewers	Original release date	Share (%)
1	1	"La oportunidad"	2,477,000	7 September 2017	17.3
2	2	"No es humano"	2,458,000	14 September 2017	16.7
3	3	"La oportunidad"	2,223,000	21 September 2017	14.9
4	4	"Hoy ya es ayer"	2,314,000	28 September 2017	14.9
5	5	"Más cerca que nunca"	2,315,000	5 October 2017	15.2
6	6	"La vida sigue"	2,092,000	19 October 2017	13.4
7	7	"Te echo de menos"	1,918,000	26 October 2017	12.5
8	8	"Un cielo sin colores"	1,964,000	2 November 2017	12.7
9	9	"No me olvides"	1,983,000	9 November 2017	11.9
10	10	"Lo que debemos hacer"	1,958,000	16 November 2017	13.0
11	11	"Por última vez"	2,023,000	23 November 2017	12.9
12	12	"Tengo algo que decirte"	2,085,000	30 November 2017	13.5
13	13	"Cuestión de sangre"	2,304,000	14 December 2017	14.7

=== Season 2 ===
This is a caption
No. overall	No. in season	Title	Viewers	Original release date	Share (%)
14	1	"El Rey de la baraja"	1,665,000	25 September 2018	11.5
15	2	"Secretos compartidos"	1,369,000	2 October 2018	8.6
16	3	"La leyenda del hilo rojo"	1,695,000	9 October 2018	11.2
17	4	"La llave"	2,107,000	15 October 2018	13.4
18	5	"Ángela"	1,732,000	22 October 2018	11.2
19	6	"Un hombre de palabra"	1,820,000	29 October 2018	12.5
20	7	"Entre dos mundos"	1,687,000	5 November 2018	10.9
21	8	"La caja"	1.864.000	12 November 2018	12.1
22	9	"Mentiras y latidos"	1,757,000	19 November 2018	11.1
23	10	"Relaciones personales"	1,885,000	26 November 2018	11.9
24	11	"El punto de partida"	1,710,000	3 December 2018	10.8
25	12	"Un paso adelante"	1,813,000	10 December 2018	11.9
26	13	"Dormíamos despiertos"	1,892,000	17 December 2018	12.2

=== Season 3 ===
This is a caption
No. overall	No. in season	Title	Viewers	Original release date	Share (%)
27	1	"La muerte forma parte de la vida"	1,595,000	26 September 2019	11.1
28	2	"Espérame"	1,399,000	3 October 2019	9.4
29	3	"El recuerdo del olvido"	1,473,000	10 October 2019	9.5
30	4	"Infinito"	1,422,000	17 October 2019	9.4
31	5	"Confesiones a medianoche"	1,517,000	24 October 2019	10.0
32	6	"La navaja de Ockham"	1,061,000	31 October 2019	7.9
33	7	"El amor de mi vida"	1,360,000	7 November 2019	8.5
34	8	"El interior del ser vivo"	1,424,000	14 November 2019	9.3
35	9	"Allí donde solíamos estar"	1,407,000	21 November 2019	9.2
36	10	"Los ángeles también lloran"	1,377,000	28 November 2019	9.2
37	11	"Lo que eres realmente"	1,203,000	5 December 2019	7.9
38	12	"Principio y fin"	1,267,000	12 December 2019	8.5
39	13	"Fue bonito mientras duró"	1,542,000	19 December 2019	10.0

=== Season 4 ===
No. overall	No. in season	Title	Viewers	Original release date	Share (%)
40	1	"El apagón"	1,300,000	10 March 2021	7.9
41	2	"La cruda realidad"	1,060,000	17 March 2021	6.2
42	3	"El duodécimo pasajero"	1,127,000	24 March 2021	6.7
43	4	"Los regresados"	1,231,000	31 March 2021	7.6
44	5	"La eternidad a tu alcance"	961,000	7 April 2021	5.6
45	6	"La mejor manera de llegar"	909,000	14 April 2021	5.3
46	7	"Este cuerpo no es el mío"	947,000	28 April 2021	5.5
47	8	"Sobrenatural"	819,000	5 May 2021	4.9
48	9	"Mi propio objetivo"	824,000	12 May 2021	5.1
49	10	"Visiones"	873,000	19 May 2021	5.6
50	11	"El lago"	778,000	26 May 2021	4.8
51	12	"Últimos días en la Tierra"	863,000	2 June 2021	5.6
52	13	"La cuarta dimensión"	801,000	9 June 2021	5.6

== Accolades ==
Year	Award	Category	Nominee(s)	Result	Ref.
2017	64th Ondas Awards	Best Actor in Spanish Fiction (TV)	Javier Gutiérrez	Won	
2017	5th MiM Series Awards	Best Drama Series		Nominated	
2017	5th MiM Series Awards	Best Direction		Nominated	
2017	5th MiM Series Awards	Best Screenplay		Won	
2017	5th MiM Series Awards	Best Drama Actor	Javier Gutiérrez	Won	
2017	5th MiM Series Awards	Best Drama Actress	Anna Castillo	Nominated	
2018	5th Feroz Awards	Best Drama Series		Nominated	
2018	5th Feroz Awards	Best Supporting Actor in a TV Series	Alejo Sauras	Nominated	
2018	68th Fotogramas de Plata	Best TV Actor	Alejo Sauras	Won	
2018	27th Actors and Actresses Union Awards	Best New Actor	Mon Ceballos	Nominated	
2018	20th Iris Awards	Best Fiction		Nominated	
2018	20th Iris Awards	Best Actor	Javier Gutiérrez	Nominated	
2018	20th Iris Awards	Best Screenplay	Daniel Écija, Jesús Mesas, Guillermo Cisneros, Jon de la Cuesta, Federico Muñoz, Andrés Martín, Guillermo Clua, Jaime Palacios, Mercedes Cruz & Adriana Rivas	Nominated	
2018	6th MiM Series Awards	Best Drama Actress	Cristina Plazas	Nominated	
2019	28th Actors and Actresses Union Awards	Best Lead Actor (TV)	Javier Gutiérrez	Nominated	
2019	28th Actors and Actresses Union Awards	Best Supporting Actor (TV)	Alejo Sauras	Nominated	
2020	29th Actors and Actresses Union Awards	Best Lead Actor (TV)	Javier Gutiérrez	Nominated	
2020	29th Actors and Actresses Union Awards	Best Supporting Actor (TV)	Alejo Sauras	Won	
2020	29th Actors and Actresses Union Awards	Best Actress in a Minor Role (TV)	Goizalde Núñez	Won	
2020	29th Actors and Actresses Union Awards	Best Actor in a Minor Role (TV)	Jesús Castejón	Nominated	
2022	30th Actors and Actresses Union Awards	Best Television Actor in a Secondary Role	Alfonso Bassave	Nominated	
