= Mask Singer: Adivina quién canta season 1 =

Mask Singer: Adivina quién canta
- Season 1
- Hosted by: Arturo Valls
- Judges: Javier Calvo; Javier Ambrossi; Malú; Jose Mota
- No. of contestants: 12
- Winner: Paz Vega as "Catrina"
- Runner-up: Genoveva Casanova as "Caniche"
- No. of episodes: 8

Release
- Original network: Antena 3
- Original release: 4 November – 23 December 2020

Season chronology
- Next → Season 2

The first season of Mask Singer: Adivina quién canta premiered on 4 November 2020, and lasted for 8 episodes. On 23 December 2020, Catrina (actress Paz Vega) was declared the winner.

== Panelists and host ==
Arturo Valls served as the show's host, and was joined by a permanent panel of 'investigators' composed of actors Javier Calvo and Javier Ambrossi, singer Malú and comedian José Mota. Some episodes also featured guest panelists. Classical singer Ainhoa Arteta (who would later make a guest appearance in season 2 as "Paella") was initially slated to be in the panel, but pulled out due to delays in production caused by the coronavirus pandemic and was replaced by Malú. Also, Vanesa Martín stood in for Malú when she missed a taping due to injury and Eva González appeared as a guest investigator.

== Contestants ==
Stage name	Celebrity	Occupation	Episodes							
Stage name	Celebrity	Occupation	1	2	3	4	5	6	7	8
Catrina	Paz Vega (Note: Paz Vega (Catrina) previously appeared as a guest judge during the first season of the Mexican version of the show, ¿Quién es la máscara?. She is the first person to appear as a guest judge on The Masked Singer, then later appear as a contestant on another series of the show. She would later return to the Spanish version as a permanent judge on the second season.)	Actress	WIN		RISK		RISK	WIN	WIN	WINNER
Caniche (Poodle)	Genoveva Casanova	Aristocrat		RISK		WIN	RISK	WIN	WIN	RUNNER-UP
Camaleón (Chameleon)	Toni Cantó	Politician/Actor		WIN		WIN	WIN	WIN	WIN	THIRD
Cuervo (Crow)	Jorge Lorenzo	Former MotoGP racer		WIN		WIN	WIN	RISK	WIN	FOURTH
Girasol (Sunflower)	Al Bano (Note: Al Bano (Sunflower) previously appeared as the Lion (Leone) on the Italian version of the show, Il cantante mascherato, where he placed 2nd. He is the first person to appear as a contestant on The Masked Singer in two different countries. Bano also appeared in season 2 of Il cantante mascherato as a guest panelist making him the only person who appeared as a contestant twice and a guest panelist and the fourth person to be a contestant and guest panellist after Paz Vega, Cesár Sampson and Sasha.)	Singer	WIN		WIN		RISK	RISK	OUT	
Pavo Real (Peacock)	Pastora Soler	Singer	WIN		WIN		WIN	WIN	OUT	
Cerdita (Piggie)	Terelu Campos	TV host		WIN		RISK	WIN	OUT		
Monstruo (Monster)	Fernando Tejero	Actor	RISK		WIN		OUT			
Gamba (Prawn)	Máximo Huerta	Journalist/Ex-minister		RISK		OUT				
Unicornio (Unicorn)	Norma Duval	Vedette/Actress	RISK		OUT					
Pulpo (Octopus)	Pepe Navarro	TV host/Journalist		OUT						
León (Lion)	Georgina Rodríguez	Influencer	OUT							

=== Guest masks ===
The following two celebrities also appeared under a mask for one-off performances.

Stage name	Celebrity	Occupation	Appearance
Mariquita (Ladybug)	Mónica Carrillo	Journalist	Episode 3
Robot	Cristina Pedroche	TV host	Episode 4

== Episodes ==
=== Week 1 (4 November) ===
Performances on the first episode
#	Stage name	Song	Result	
1	Monster	"Con Calma" by Daddy Yankee feat. Snow	RISK	
2	Catrina	"La Llorona" by Chavela Vargas	WIN	
3	Peacock	"The Best" by Tina Turner	WIN	
4	Lion	"Si por mi fuera" by Beret	RISK	
5	Sunflower	"Circle of Life" by Elton John	WIN	
6	Unicorn	"El Anillo" by Jennifer Lopez	RISK	
Final round			Identity	Result
1	Monster	"Hay un amigo en mí" by Tony Cruz	undisclosed	SAFE
2	Lion	"No Controles" by Olé Olé	Georgina Rodríguez	OUT
3	Unicorn	"¿A quién le importa?" by Alaska y Dinarama	undisclosed	SAFE

=== Week 2 (11 November) ===
Performances on the second episode
#	Stage name	Song	Result	
1	Poodle	"Mamma Mia" by ABBA	RISK	
2	Chameleon	"Caruso" by Lucio Dalla	WIN	
3	Crow	"Morado" by J Balvin	WIN	
4	Octopus	"5 Sentidos" by Dvicio feat. Taburete	RISK	
5	Piggie	"Lola Bunny" by Lola Índigo and Don Patricio	WIN	
6	Gamba	"I Love It" by Icona Pop feat. Charli XCX	RISK	
Final round			Identity	Result
1	Poodle	"Don't Cha" by The Pussycat Dolls feat. Busta Rhymes	undisclosed	SAFE
2	Octopus	"Mi gran noche" by Raphael	Pepe Navarro	OUT
3	Gamba	"Volare" by Domenico Modugno	undisclosed	SAFE

=== Week 3 (18 November) ===
Performances on the third episode
#	Stage name	Song	Result	
1	Peacock	"Con Altura" by Rosalía	WIN	
2	Monster	"Everybody (Backstreet's Back)" by Backstreet Boys	WIN	
3	Unicorn	"Believe" by Cher	RISK	
4	Ladybug	"Someone like You" by Adele	Mónica Carrillo	
5	Catrina	"Taki Taki" by DJ Snake feat. Selena Gomez, Ozuna and Cardi B	RISK	
6	Sunflower	"My Way" by Frank Sinatra	WIN	
Final round			Identity	Result
1	Catrina	"Proud Mary" by Tina Turner	undisclosed	SAFE
2	Unicorn	"Poker Face" by Lady Gaga	Norma Duval	OUT

=== Week 4 (25 November) ===
Performances on the fourth episode
#	Stage name	Song	Result	
1	Crow	"Walk of Life" by Dire Straits	WIN	
2	Piggie	"Cadillac solitario" by Loquillo	RISK	
3	Chameleon	"Shotgun" by George Ezra	WIN	
4	Robot	"Superstar" by Jamelia	Cristina Pedroche	
5	Gamba	"Vente Pa' Ca" by Ricky Martin feat. Maluma	RISK	
6	Poodle	"No Me Acuerdo" by Thalía and Natti Natasha	WIN	
Final round			Identity	Result
1	Piggie	"Antes muerta que sencilla" by María Isabel	undisclosed	SAFE
2	Gamba	"Calma" by Pedro Capó	Máximo Huerta	OUT

=== Week 5 (2 December) ===
- Vanesa Martín stood in for an absent Malú in the investigators' panel.

Performances on the fifth episode
#	Stage name	Song	Identity	Result
1	Sunflower	"(I Can't Get No) Satisfaction" by The Rolling Stones	undisclosed	RISK
2	Peacock	"What About Us" by Pink	undisclosed	WIN
3	Chameleon	"Salta!!!" by Tequila	undisclosed	WIN
4	Catrina	"Man! I Feel Like a Woman!" by Shania Twain	undisclosed	RISK
5	Crow	"Me olvidé de vivir" by Julio Iglesias	undisclosed	WIN
6	Poodle	"Like a Prayer" by Madonna	undisclosed	RISK
7	Piggie	"1, 2, 3" by Sofía Reyes feat. Jason Derulo and De La Ghetto	undisclosed	WIN
8	Monster	"Relax, Take It Easy" by Mika	Fernando Tejero	OUT

=== Week 6 (9 December) ===
- Eva González appeared as a guest investigator.

Performances on the sixth episode
#	Stage name	Song	Identity	Result
1	Poodle	"Firework" by Katy Perry	undisclosed	WIN
2	Piggie	"¡Chas! y aparezco a tu lado" by Álex & Christina	Terelu Campos	OUT
3	Crow	"Besos" by El Canto del Loco	undisclosed	RISK
4	Peacock	"Always" by Bon Jovi	undisclosed	WIN
5	Sunflower	"Despacito" by Luis Fonsi and Daddy Yankee	undisclosed	RISK
6	Catrina	"Bang Bang" by Jessie J, Ariana Grande and Nicki Minaj	undisclosed	WIN
7	Chameleon	"Como yo te amo" by Rocío Jurado	undisclosed	WIN

=== Week 7 (16 December) ===
Performances on the seventh episode
#	Stage name	Song	Identity	Result
1	Chameleon	"Blinding Lights" by The Weeknd	undisclosed	WIN
2	Catrina	"Rabiosa" by Shakira	undisclosed	WIN
3	Peacock	"Physical" by Dua Lipa	Pastora Soler	OUT
4	Poodle	"Sweet Child o' Mine" by Guns N' Roses	undisclosed	WIN
5	Crow	"Eso que tú me das" by Jarabe de Palo	undisclosed	WIN
6	Sunflower	"The Show Must Go On" by Queen	Al Bano	OUT

=== Week 8 (23 December) ===
Performances on the eighth episode
#	Stage name	Song	Identity	Result
1	Poodle	"Only Girl (In the World)" by Rihanna	undisclosed	SAFE
2	Crow	"Più bella cosa" by Eros Ramazzotti	Jorge Lorenzo	OUT
3	Chameleon	"Cake by the Ocean" by DNCE	undisclosed	SAFE
4	Catrina	"Todos Me Miran" by Gloria Trevi	undisclosed	SAFE
Final round 1			Identity	Result
5	Catrina	"Mi Cama" by Karol G & J Balvin	undisclosed	SAFE
6	Poodle	"Havana" by Camila Cabello	undisclosed	SAFE
7	Chameleon	"Feeling Good" by Michael Bublé	Toni Cantó	OUT
Final round 2			Identity	Result
1	Poodle	"Oops!... I Did It Again" by Britney Spears	Genoveva Casanova	RUNNER-UP
2	Catrina	"I Will Survive" by Gloria Gaynor	Paz Vega	WINNER

== Ratings ==
Mask Singer: Adivina quién canta consolidated viewership and adjusted position Colour key: – Highest rating during the season (nominal) – Lowest rating during the season (nominal)
Episode	Original airdate	Timeslot	Viewers (millions)	Share	Night Rank	Source
1	4 November 2020	Wednesday 10:45 pm	3.66	27.2%	#1	
2	11 November 2020	Wednesday 10:45 pm	3.12	23.9%	#1	
3	18 November 2020	Wednesday 10:45 pm	2.86	23.6%	#1	
4	25 November 2020	Wednesday 10:45 pm	2.54	21.6%	#1	
5	2 December 2020	Wednesday 10:45 pm	2.34	22.5%	#1	
6	9 December 2020	Wednesday 10:45 pm	2.35	21.9%	#1	
7	16 December 2020	Wednesday 10:45 pm	2.57	22.4%	#1	
8	23 December 2020	Wednesday 10:45 pm	2.95	25.9%	#1	
