= América Valenzuela =

Spanish science journalist

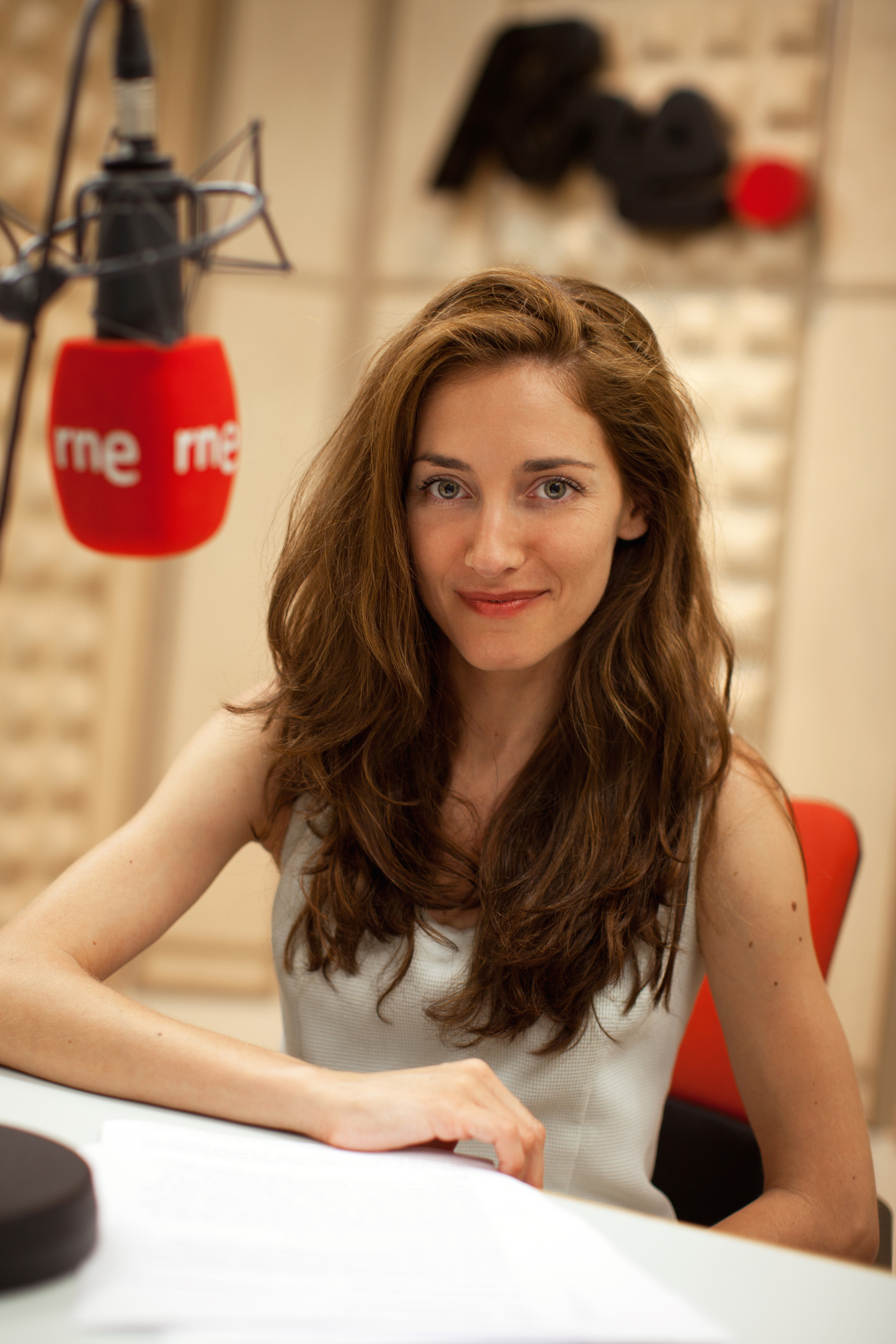
- Born: 1977 (age 48–49)
- Occupation: Science Journalist

América Jimena Valenzuela (born in 1977 in Madrid, Spain) is a Spanish science journalist and science popularizer.

== Biography ==
Valenzuela is a science journalist who works in radio, television, press, and the web. She has a degree in Chemistry.

She divulges science on "Onda Cero," in the program "Por fin no es lunes," presented by Jaime Cantizano.

From 2004 to 2015, she was in charge of the Radio 5 program of RNE "Ciencia al Cubo." She collaborated in the late night humor and science "Órbita Laika" of La 2 and in the program "Cámara Abierta 2.0." She has collaborated with RNE's "Las Mañanas," writing about science and health in the newspaper "El Correo" and in the now-defunct "Eureka" supplement of the newspaper El Mundo, among others. Until 2017, she wrote in the newspaper "El Independiente."

In 2010, she published "Ciencia al Cubo" with the editorial "Temas de Hoy" of Planeta Group.

For three years, she was part of "La noche en 24 horas" of Channel 24 horas, commenting on current scientific issues. She was a reporter for "Aqui la Tierra," (about nature), at La 1. She wrote reports and the blog "Cóctel de Ciencias" for the pop-science magazine Quo, for scientific dissemination and entertainment. In 2016, she wrote in the paper supplement of the newspaper El Mundo and opinion columns in "Infolibre." She takes part in the radio program "Ya Veremos" of M80, directed and presented by Juan Luis Cano.

In 2017, she collaborated on the television programs "Dame Veneno," "en Cero," of Movistar+, and "All you need is love ... o no" (Telecinco) with Risto Mejide.

She was a member of the Spanish Association for Scientific Communication until 2017.

== Awards ==
- FECYT Prize for Scientific Communication.
- ASEBIO (Note: The Spanish Association of Biotechnological Companies) / GENOMA ESPAÑA (Note: Government Foundation) Prize for Communication and Dissemination of Biotechnology.
- Concha García Campoy Journalism Award from the National Academy of Television Arts and Sciences (NATAS).

== Works ==
- Valenzuela, América (2010) Ciencia al Cubo. Temas de Hoy. Tanto por saber. 320 págs. ISBN 978-84-8460-858-5
