= El accidente =

- Genre: Drama; Thriller
- Created by: Daniel Écija; Inés París
- Based on: Son by Berkun Oya
- Starring: Inma Cuesta; Quim Gutiérrez
- Opening theme: La verdad (Cecilia Krull)
- Country of origin: Spain
- Original language: Spanish
- No. of seasons: 1
- No. of episodes: 13

Production
- Production companies: Globomedia; Good Mood

Original release
- Network: Telecinco
- Release: 28 November 2017 – 20 February 2018

El accidente is a Spanish drama television series created by Daniel Écija and Inés París that premiered on Telecinco on 28 November 2017, and concluded on 20 February 2018. The series was produced by Telecinco and co-produced by Globomedia and Good Mood, and was based on the Turkish drama Son also known as The End. The series consisted of a total of 13 episodes. It stars Inma Cuesta as Lucía, and Quim Gutiérrez as José as main characters.

== Plot ==
The series begins with a tragic airplane crash with no survivors. Certain that her husband José (Quim Gutiérrez) was on the plane, Lucía (Inma Cuesta) drives to the airport. However, there is no trace of him on the list of passengers or among the deceased, and Lucía is assaulted by doubts. Tireless, she will pull a thread that will lead her to discover that, perhaps, she did not really know the man she loves.

== Cast ==
- Inma Cuesta as Lucía
- Quim Gutiérrez as José Espada
- Eusebio Poncela as João Ferreira
- Berta Vázquez as María
- Joel Bosqued as Manuel
- Alain Hernández as Juan Espada
- Jorge Bosch as Ramón
- César Mateo as Nacho
- Daniel Albaladejo as Julián

== Episodes ==
No.	Title	Directed by	Original release date	Spain viewers (millions)
1	"Adiós, amor"	Inés París	28 November 2017	3.24
2	"La soledad"	Jesús Rodrigo	5 December 2017	2.70
3	"Apariciones"	Sandra Gallego	12 December 2017	2.62
4	"La matanza"	David Molina Encinas	19 December 2017	2.52
5	"Cuidados intensivos"	Jesús Rodrigo	26 December 2017	2.45
6	"La entrega"	Sandra Gallego	2 January 2018	2.52
7	"Los ángeles blancos"	Iñaki Peñafiel	9 January 2018	2.57
8	"La huída"	David Molina Encinas	16 January 2018	2.40
9	"La cena"	Sandra Gallego	23 January 2018	2.29
10	"Un ángel en el infierno"	Iñaki Peñafiel	30 January 2018	2.49
11	"La decisión de José"	Sandra Gallego	6 February 2018	2.46
12	"La detención"	Inés París	13 February 2018	2.68
13	"La lluvia"	Iñaki Peñafiel	20 February 2018	2.91

== Ratings ==
Viewership and ratings per season of El accidente
Season	Episodes	First aired		Last aired		Avg. viewers (millions)	18–49 rank
Season	Episodes	Date	Viewers (millions)	Date	Viewers (millions)	Avg. viewers (millions)	18–49 rank
1	13	28 November 2017	3.24	20 February 2018	2.91	2.61	TBD
