= Pedro Piqueras =

Spanish journalist and news anchor

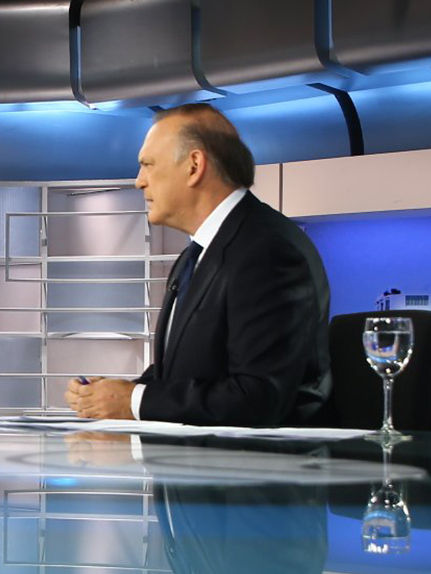
- Piqueras during a 2017 broadcast of Informativos Telecinco.
- Born: Pedro María Piqueras Gómez; 6 May 1955 (age 71); Albacete, Castilla-La Mancha, Spain
- Education: Universidad Complutense de Madrid
- Occupations: Journalist, news anchor and director
- Years active: 1977–2023
- Television: Telediario (1988–93); Antena 3 Noticias (1993–96, 1998–2002); Espejo Público (1996–2003); A plena luz (2002); Informativos Telecinco (2006–23)

Pedro María Piqueras Gómez (May 6, 1955) is a Spanish journalist and newscaster. After rising to fame as a newcaster on TVE's Telediario, in 2006 he swapped to the relaunched Informativos Telecinco.

He announced his retirement from TV journalism on Telecinco in December 2023, to be replaced by Carlos Franganillo who, like Piqueras, jumped ship from TVE to relaunch the show.

== Biography ==
=== Early life ===
Piqueras graduated from the Complutense University of Madrid during the mid-1970s.

=== RNE (1977–1988) ===
In 1977 Piqueras joined at the RNE crew as news reader of the Foreign Radio of Spain and the international area of RNE. Some years later was director of the weekend news programs and other shows as "Al Cabo de la Calle" and "Abrimos los Sábados".

=== Televisión Española (1988–1993) ===
In 1988 Piqueras joined the news personnel of Televisión Española as the director of Telediario in its two daily broadcasts. He was also the host of the topical magazine programme Buenos Días from 1989 to 1990.

=== Antena 3 (1993–2004) ===
In 1993 he joined the news division of Antena 3 as presenter and director of the second edition of Antena 3 Noticias. In September 1996, he became host of weekly magazine show Espejo Público. In 1998 he presented editions of Antena 3 Noticias until 2002, firstly with Miriam Romero, then with Sandra Barneda and then later alone. In September 2002 he launched the daytime chat show A plena luz, which was canceled in December 2002 due to poor ratings.

After that he hosted TV specials, such as Diario de guerra on the Iraq War, and the late-night news program 7 Días, 7 Noches. In March 2004 he hosted daytime magazine show La Respuesta.

=== Back to RNE (2004–2006) ===
Piqueras left Antena 3 in May 2004 after being named as news director of RNE, with the target of "making RNE a station for everybody". In 2004 he hosted the news-based chat show Enfoque on TVE 2. He left the network in 2006 for "a non-professional reason".

=== Telecinco (2006–2023) ===
On January 25, 2006 Telecinco confirmed that Piqueras would become its new news director and anchor of the flagship 9pm news broadcast, to relaunch its flagging news ratings with a new personnel and theme tune. His show soon attracted viewers from Antena 3 and quickly surpassed them in the ratings. From 2012 his show was the first private TV news broadcast to take the lead away from Telediario in a timeslot with tight competition. Later in the 2010s, Informativos Telecinco would lose its lead to a revamped Antena 3 Noticias.

In 2014 Piqueras presented live coverage of the abdication of Juan Carlos I and accession of Felipe VI, and in 2016 returned temporarily to Antena 3 Noticias to moderate the debate between the main candidates in the elections of that year with Ana Blanco and Vicente Vallés.

Piqueras has also made acting cameos portraying himself as a newscaster in Celda 211, Spanish Affair and Superlópez, as well as in Anclados and Sé quien eres.

In the 2023 elections, Piqueras led Telecinco's successful broadcast of the results, which came a close third in the ratings to Antena 3. Later that summer, Piqueras announced he would step down from Telecinco at the end of the year, and in November his replacement was confirmed to be Carlos Franganillo, transferring from TVE.

== Awards and nominations ==
- 1990: TP de Oro as best news anchor for Telediario (Nominated)
- 1997: Two Antena de Oro awards by Espejo Público (Won)
- 2003: Premio ATV as best communicator for news programs (Nominated)
- 2009: Antena de Oro as best news anchor for Informativos Telecinco.
