= Radio International =

Iranian communist radio station

Radio International رادیو انترناسیونال
- Moldova
- Frequency: 15.55 MHz

Programming
- Language: Persian
- Affiliations: Worker-communist Party of Iran

Radio International (Persian: رادیو انترناسیونال) was a radio station broadcasting in Persian that was affiliated with the Worker-Communist Party of Iran and agitated against the Islamic Republic of Iran.

The slogan of Radio International was “Voice of Liberty, Voice of Worker, Voice of Truth, and Voice of Humanity”.

It was reportedly broadcast from Sweden, but in November 1999 it was believed to be broadcast from a shortwave station in Moldova on 15,550 kHz (15.55 MHz) and based in the United Kingdom. The director of radio was Siavash Daneshvar and some notable staff include Sima Bahari, Sadegh Zandi, and Soosan Saberi.
