= Las tardes de RNE =

- Home station: RNE
- Hosted by: David Cantero and Marta Solano
- Original release: 2012

Las tardes de RNE is the afternoon program of Radio Nacional de España, in live between 16:00h and 20:00h. Since September 2025, the program has been presented by David Cantero, who returned to RTVE 15 years after leaving for Telecinco, and Marta Solano.

== History ==
Lourdes Maldonado hosted the radio program between September 2023 and July 2025.

Previously, it was presented by Carles Mesa until 2023, and before that, it was presented by Alfredo Menéndez starting in 2013.

Initially, the program was presented by Yolanda Flores starting in September 2012, replacing Asuntos propios.
