= Matías Prats Cañete =

Spanish radio and television journalist

The Most Excellent Matías Prats Cañete
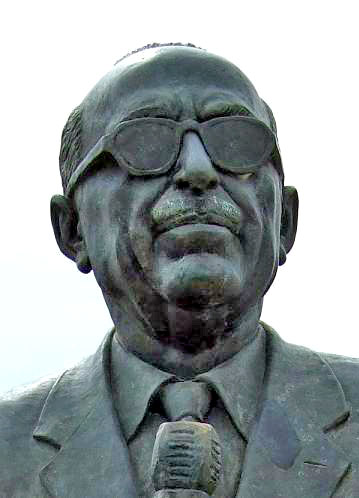
- Bust of Matías Prats Cañete on Villa del Río
- Born: 4 December 1913; Villa del Río (Córdoba), Spain
- Died: 8 September 2004 (aged 90); Madrid, Spain
- Occupations: Sports announcer and radio journalist
- Years active: 1945–1974
- Spouse: Emilia Luque Montejano
- Children: Matías, Juan Jesús, María del Carmen

Matías Prats Cañete (4 December 1913 – 8 September 2004) was a Spanish radio and television journalist. He was best known for his sports narrations and for being the narrator of the No-Do during part of the franquism period.

He is father of Matías Prats Luque, who is also a journalist and anchor on Antena 3 and grandfather of Matías Prats Chacón, a sports host in Telecinco.

== Career ==
Shortly after the end of the Spanish Civil War Prats began his career as assistant on Radio Algeciras, later he moved to Málaga where he worked as announcer of bullfights on RNE and shortly after as football announcer.

In 1945 he returned to Madrid following the inauguration of the new RNE studios in Arganda del Rey. In 1947 he was promoted to head of the Department of Performing Stations and from the same year until 1971 he was responsible of the writing and speeching of the Noticiarios y Documentales Cinematográficos (No-Do).

He also worked in Televisión Española since its inception in 1956 until 1965 as announcer of football matches and bull fightings, credits on TVE include Pantalla deportiva (1959), La Copa (1963), Graderío (1963) and Ayer domingo (1965). He retired in 1985, however, works in radio ended in 1974.

== Awards ==
- 1955: Premio Ondas as best sports announcer
- 1965: Premio Microfono de Oro
- 1965: Premio Ondas Special award due to his 20 years of work on RNE
- 1993: Premio Víctor de la Serna for best journalism work during the year
- 1996: Premio Ondas as best journalism work
- 1999: Premio ATV on radio
- 2000: Premio ATV for his life on radio

== Honours ==
- Gold Medal of Merit in Labour (Kingdom of Spain, 30 April 1998).
