= Espejo público =

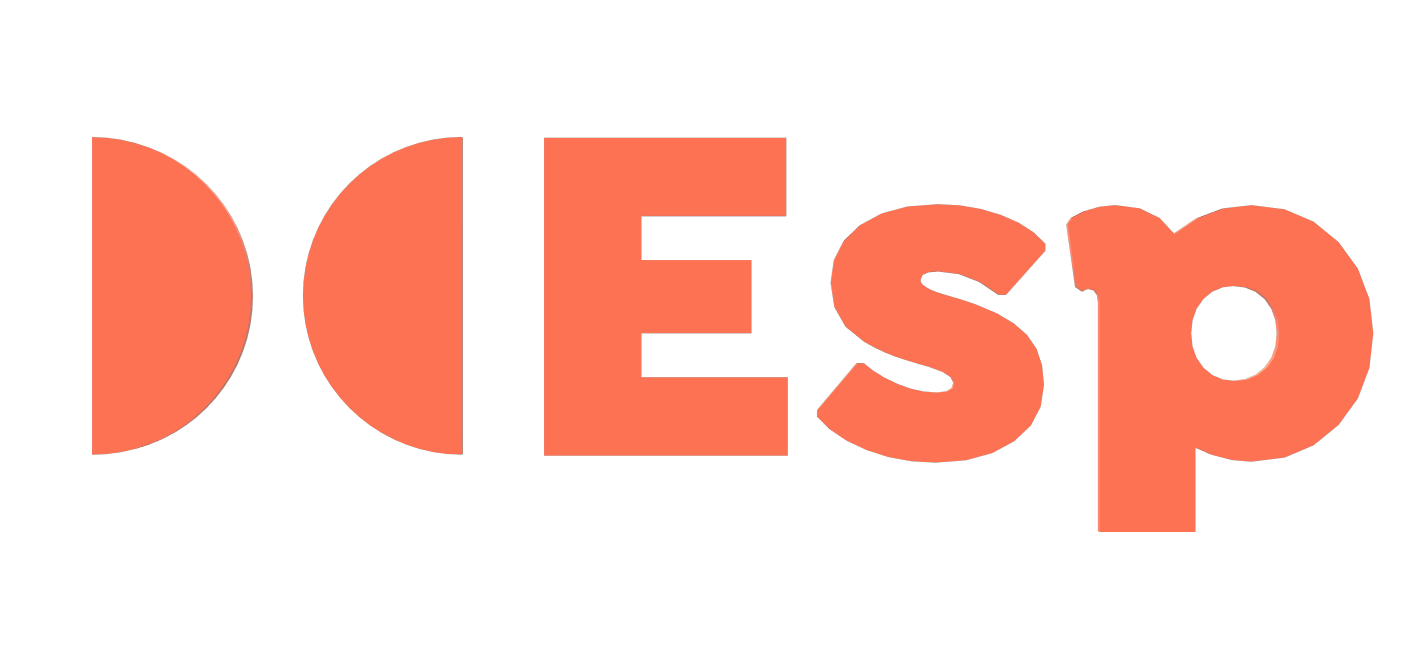
- Genre: News; Magazine show
- Created by: José Oneto
- Presented by: Pedro Piqueras (1996–1998); Roberto Arce (1998–2002); Sonsoles Suárez (2002–2006); Susanna Griso (2006–present)
- Country of origin: Spain
- Original language: Spanish
- No. of episodes: 495 (1998–2006); 4,635

Original release
- Network: Antena 3
- Release: 20 October 1996 – 29 October 2006
- Release: 11 December 2006 – present

Espejo público (English: "Public Mirror") is a Spanish TV magazine show presented by Susanna Griso since 2006. It originally premiered on Antena 3 on 20 October 1996 as a weekly Sunday night current affairs show at 8:30pm, hosted by Pedro Piqueras, who was eventually replaced by Roberto Arce and later Sonsoles Suárez, ending on 29 October 2006 after 495 shows.

After axing the show, Antena 3 announced it would be reformatted as a daytime magazine show discussing current affairs as a more typical daytime chat show. Since 2019 it has been divided into the main show, from 8:55 to 11:00 and Más espejo público, which focuses more on investigations and entertainment, from 11:00 to 12:30 and social commentary from 12:30 to 13:30.
