= Daniel Écija =

Spanish producer and director

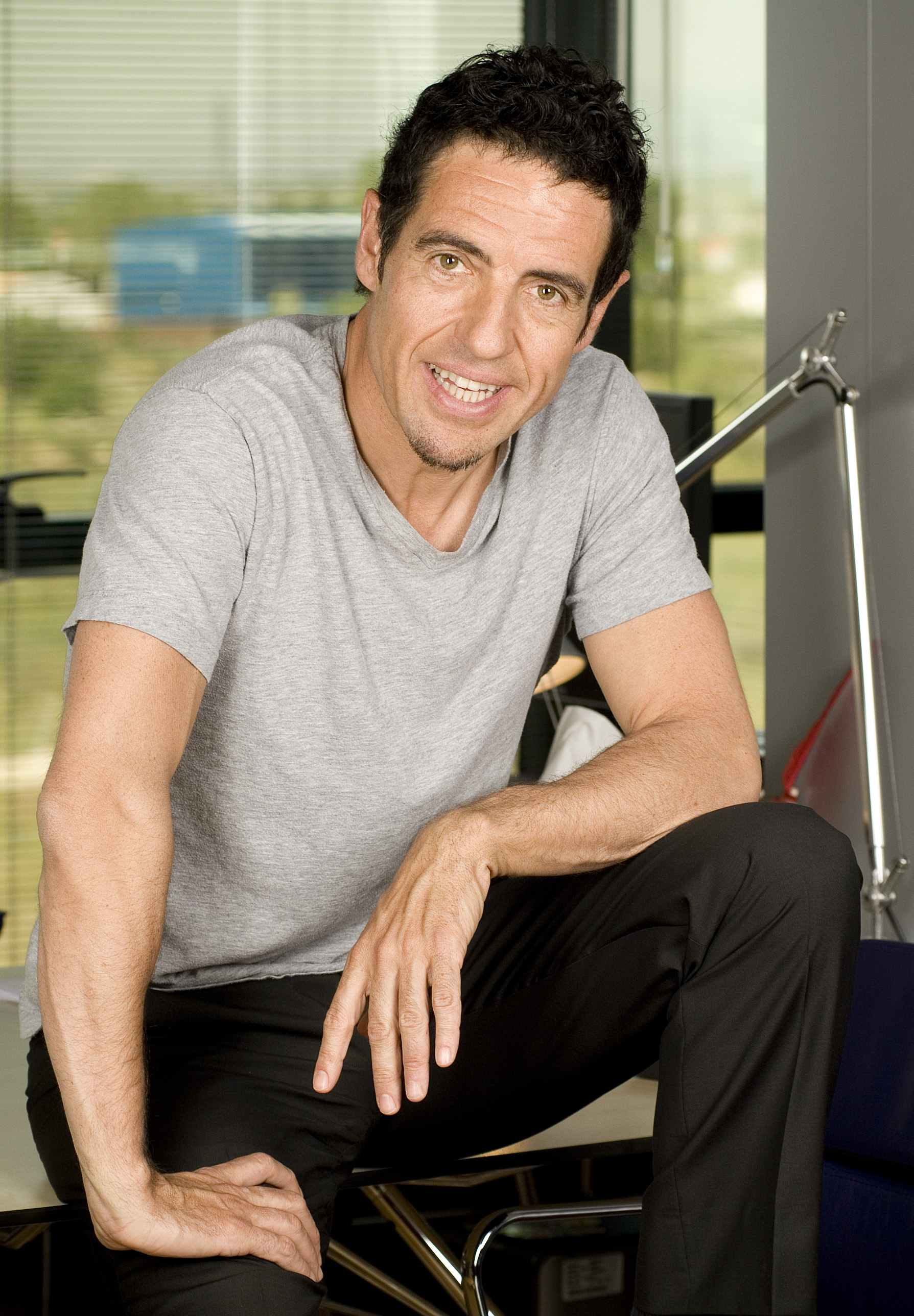
- Born: 17 June 1963 (age 61); Wittenoon, Australia
- Occupation(s): Television producer, screenwriter

Daniel Arturo Écija Bernal (born 17 June 1963) is a media producer and screenwriter. Starting with Médico de familia, he is credited as creator and executive producer of a long list of Spanish television series. He served as chairman of Globomedia, of which he was a founding partner.

== Biography ==
Born in 1963 in Wittenoon, Western Australia, son to a Spanish miner who immigrated to Australia, and who, having returned to Spain to work as driver, died from asbestos contamination acquired in the Australian mines.

Écija started his career as television operator, later working as film editor, production assistant, director, writer and producer.

He founded Globomedia together with Emilio Aragón and José María Irisarri in 1993. Their first fiction production was the widely successful sitcom Médico de familia, released in 1995 and in which Écija had his debut as director, whereas Aragón starred in as lead character in the series. Together with the series Farmacia de guardia, Médico de Familia is credited with redefining the fiction landscape in Spain in the 1990s, bringing the boom of family dramedies.

Écija and Globomedia then created a number of series including Periodistas, SMS: Sin Miedo a Soñar, Un paso adelante, 7 vidas, Los hombres de Paco, El Internado, El Barco, Águila Roja, and Vis a vis (Locked Up).

After 25 years, Écija left Globomedia (absorbed by Mediapro) in 2017, creating a new company (Good Mood), that nonetheless partnered with Globomedia. While working in Good Mood, he has created shows such as Estoy vivo, The Barrier, and Cristo y Rey.
