= Susanna Griso =

Spanish journalist

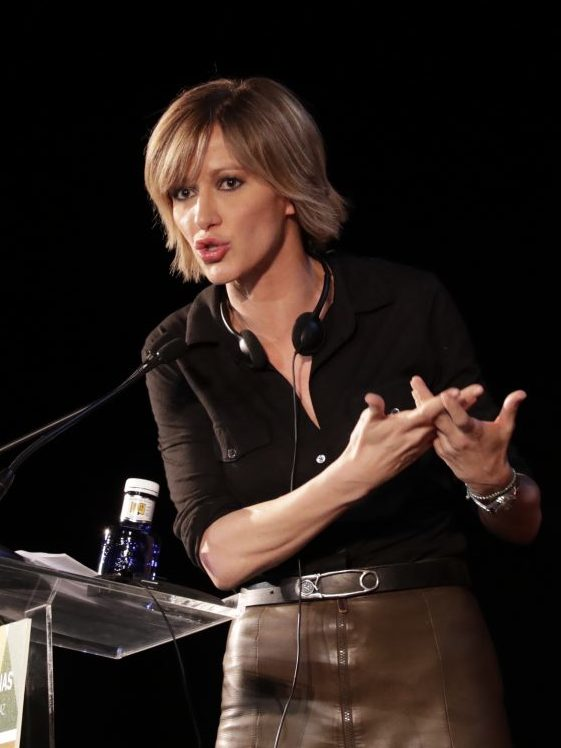
- Griso in 2017
- Born: Susanna Griso Raventós; 8 October 1969 (age 57); Barcelona, Spain
- Education: Autonomous University of Barcelona
- Occupations: Journalist, presenter
- Years active: 1993–present
- Spouse: Carles Torras Dalmau (m. 1997; div. 2021)
- Awards: Antena de Oro (2006); Micrófono de Oro (2008); Ondas Award (2010)
- Presenting career
- Show: Espejo público (2006–present); Dos días y una noche (2016); Un café con Susanna (2018)
- Station: Antena 3

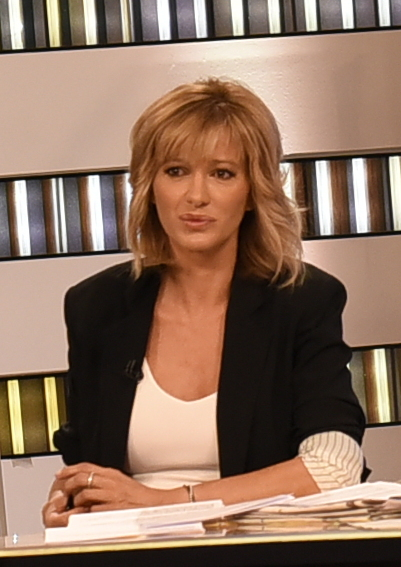
Susanna Griso, in 2018.

Susanna Griso Raventós (born 8 October 1969) is a Spanish journalist and television presenter.

== Biography ==
Susanna Griso was born into a large family in Barcelona. Her father is an industrialist of the textile sector and her mother is descended from the family that owns the Codorníu Winery.

With a degree in journalism from the Autonomous University of Barcelona (UAB), she began her professional career at Ràdio Sant Cugat and Catalunya Ràdio. In 1993 she presented the TV3 talk shows Tres senyores i un senyor and Fóra de joc. In 1995 she presented the news program Telenotícies and the special Resum de l'any.

In the 1997–1998 season, Griso presented L'informatiu on TVE Catalonia, a period in which she covered the burial of Princess Diana and the wedding of Infanta Cristina and Iñaki Urdangarin for all of Spain.

In 1998 she started working on Antena 3, joining the show Noticias 1 with Matías Prats, and since December 2006 she has presented the current events program Espejo público.

In 2010 she contributed to the photographic exhibition Mujeres al natural, in support of cancer research. In January 2011 she presented a special program about Queen Sofía in connection with the miniseries that Antena 3 broadcast that year. In January 2014, she presented several special programs on The Time in Between, a format that consisted of commenting on the current events of the time and that was broadcast just after each chapter of the series.

== Television career ==
- 1993: Tres senyores i un senyor, on TV3
- 1993: Fóra de joc., on TV3
- 1995: Telenotícies, en TV3
- 1997–1998: L'informatiu, on TVE Catalonia (presenter)
- 1998–2006: Antena 3 Noticias, on Antena 3 (presenter)
- 2006–present: Espejo público, on Antena 3 (presenter)
- 2014: Especial: El tiempo entre costuras, on Antena 3 (presenter)
- 2016: Dos días y una noche, on Antena 3 (presenter)

=== Appearances on TV series ===
- Aquí no hay quien viva (2003) – 1 episode
- Homo Zapping (2003) – 1 episode
- Un paso adelante (2005) – 1 episode
- Los hombres de Paco (2005) – 1 episode
- Física o Química (2011) – 1 episode
- Vive cantando (2013) – 1 episode
- Money Heist (2017) – 1 episode

== Awards and nominations ==
Award	Year	Category	Result	Ref.
TP de Oro	2003	News Presenter	Nominated	
Antena de Oro	2006	Television	Winner	
Micrófono de Oro	2008	Television	Winner	
TP de Oro	2008	Variety Show Presenter	Nominated	
Ondas Award	2010	Best Presenter	Winner	
Joan Ramón Mainat	2014	Presenter	Winner	
Eisenhower First Amendment Award	2017	Promotion of freedom of the press	Winner	
Ondas Award	2017	Best Presenter	Winner	
Nipho Award	2018	Professional Career	Winner	

== Controversies ==
Phrases invented in leakage of illegal recording

Asunta Basterra's parents had been detained and placed in nearby dungeons so that police officers could record everything they said to each other. On 30 October 2013, Griso's programme leaked the first recordings of these conversations. A sign that appeared briefly indicated that the phrases were read by actors:

Rosario Porto: "You and your little games? Have you had time to get rid of that?" Alfonso Basterra: "Shut up, maybe they're listening to us."

These phrases do not appear in the official police transcript nor are they heard in any other part of the conversations that were not transcribed; however, they were considered to be true and repeated for years, before and after the trial, by almost all Spanish media, including public television channels.

Interview with Ángel Hernández Pardo

Ángel Hernández Pardo had allegedly helped his wife, who had been sick with multiple sclerosis for 30 years, die. She had attempted suicide 23 years ago and was totally dependent. According to him, she asked him to help her stop suffering.

In an interview in Espejo Público, Hernández indicated that he was very affected, but that he was satisfied for having ended his wife's suffering.

In reference to some videos that the husband had recorded, Griso asked the now widower:

Why did you record those videos? To influence the electoral campaign?

The interviewee responded with:

Me la trae al pairo. (I couldn't care less.)

Days later Griso declared that she made a mistake when phrasing the question and apologized:

It is clear that I was wrong in the way I phrased the question. I apologize for that. Susanna Griso

Call for March 8, 2020 In the days before the demonstration for working women on March 8, 2020, Griso encouraged citizens to attend the demonstration even though there had already been 589 people affected and 17 dead from COVID-19.

Let the coronavirus not be an excuse not to go to the March 8. Susanna Griso

Interview with Seth Flaxman, scientist at Imperial College about COVID-19

Griso interviewed Seth Flaxman, a scientist at Imperial College London, in Espejo Público in which the program supposedly tried to link COVID-19 infections with the 8-M demonstrations, even though Flaxman did not make such a link.
