= Matías Prats Luque =

Spanish sports and news journalist

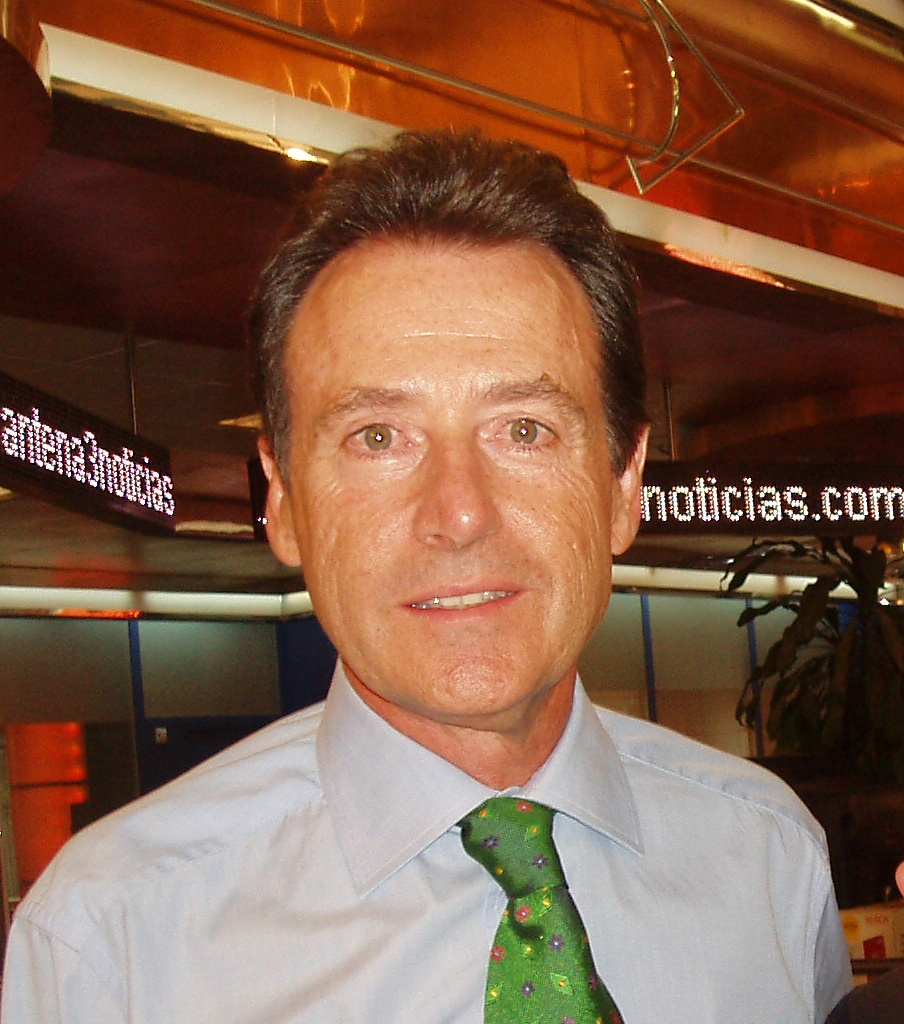
- Prats in 2010
- Born: 14 November 1950 (age 75); Madrid, Spain
- Occupation: Presenter
- Years active: 1975–present
- Spouse: Maite García Chacón (m. 1984; sep. 2012)
- Partner: Ruth Izcue (2013–present)
- Children: 2; including Matías Prats Chacón
- Father: Matías Prats Cañete

Matías Prats Luque (pronounced [maˈti.as pɾats ˈluke]; born 14 November 1950) is a Spanish sports and news journalist.

Matías Prats graduated in law and journalism. The journalist, son of the legendary Matías Prats Cañete, began his career at radio station La Voz de Madrid. In 1975, he began working for Televisión Española (TVE) in the programme Redacción Noche presented by Joaquín Arozamena on La 2. He presented the TVE jury and was the Spanish spokesperson for both the OTI Festival 1977 and the Eurovision Song Contest 1978.

As a sports journalist, he covered eight Olympic Games, several FIFA World Cup tournaments, Grand Slam tournaments, the Davis Cup, The Masters or the Ryder Cup. In 1990 Prats directed Estudio Estadio on Televisión Española, a sports programme he presented from 1981 to 1993. In 1991, he joined the first edition of Telediario as a news anchor. Later, he hosted Fútbol de Primera and Sólo Goles in 1994.

Since joining Antena 3 in September 1998, Matías Prats has been a news anchor on Antena 3 Noticias. He has since been recognized as one of the most popular television journalists in Spain and his current newscasts (weekends at 3 and 9pm on Antena 3 alongside Mónica Carrillo) are usually the most-watched in the country.

His son Matías Prats Chacón is a third-generation sports journalist working in Telecinco.
