= Onda Cero =

- Spain

Programming
- Language: Spanish
- Format: News, talk, sport and music

Ownership
- Owner: Atresmedia
- Sister stations: Europa FM; Melodía FM

History
- First air date: 26 November 1990

Links
- Webcast: www.ondacero.es

Onda Cero is a Spanish national generalist radio station, a part of the Atresmedia media group. It is Spain's third-largest radio station by number of listeners as of 2024.

Among its programs are Más de Uno, Julia en la Onda, La Brújula, El Transistor, Por Fin no es Lunes (with Jaime Cantizano and América Valenzuela), and Radioestadio.

The station started broadcasting on 26 November 1990. It 1999, it was acquired by Telefónica from ONCE.

In 2001, it was acquired by Antena 3 from Telefónica.
