= Antena 3 Noticias =

Spanish news brand

- Starring: Angie Rigueiro, María José Sáez 06:15h. Lorena García, María José Sáez 07:30h. Sandra Golpe 15h. Vicente Vallés, Esther Vaquero 21 h. Matías Prats, Mónica Carrillo Weekends
- Country of origin: Spain
- Original language: Spanish
- No. of episodes: N/A

Production
- Running time: 45 mins.

Original release
- Network: Antena 3
- Release: 1990 – present

Antena 3 Noticias ("Antena 3 News") is the brand for Spanish broadcaster Antena 3's news programmes.

== Programme format ==
Logo used from 2018 to 27 January 2025

Logo used from 27 January to 31 August 2025

The programme is generally presented by two newsreaders, with additional newsreaders for the sport. Most items will be made up of reports and are generally preceded and followed by the correspondent reporting live (Directo) from the scene of the report. The programme is followed by a weather report known as El Tiempo. The entire running time including commercial breaks and El Tiempo is one hour.

== Broadcast times ==
The programme is broadcast three times daily with each of the broadcasts being numbered (e.g. Antena 3 Noticias de la Mañana, Antena 3 Noticias 2 etc.) The flagship evening programme goes out head to head with the programme Telediario on rival public network TVE.
