= 26th Iris Awards (Spain) =

Television awards

- Date: 14 January 2025
- Site: Gran Teatro Caixabank Príncipe Pío, Madrid, Spain
- Organized by: Academy of Television and Audiovisual Arts and Sciences

The 26th Iris Awards ceremony, presented by the Academy of Television and Audiovisual Arts and Sciences, took place at the Gran Teatro Caixabank Príncipe Pío in Madrid on 14 January 2025.

== Background ==
The Academy of Television and Audiovisual Arts and Sciences disclosed the nominations on 12 November 2024.

== Winners and nominees ==
The winners and nominees are listed as follows:

Best Actor: Alberto San Juan — Cristóbal Balenciaga (Disney+); Álex García — El Inmortal. Gangs of Madrid (Movistar Plus+); José Coronado — Wrong Side of the Tracks (Telecinco); Luis Tosar — The Law of the Sea (La 1); Miguel Herrán — Los Farad (Prime Video); Quim Gutiérrez — Burning Body (Netflix)	Best Actress: Candela Peña — The Asunta Case (Netflix); Carmen Machi — La mesías (Movistar Plus+); Elena Anaya — Past Lies (Disney+); Eva Longoria — Land of Women (Apple TV+); Natalia Sánchez — Sueños de libertad (Antena 3); Vicky Luengo — Red Queen (Prime Video)
Best Production (Fiction): Ramón Campos — The Asunta Case (Netflix); Albert Bori — Wrong Side of the Tracks (Telecinco); Amaya Muruzábal, Pere Roca, Juan Gómez-Jurado — Red Queen (Prime Video); Domingo Corral, Fran Araújo, Susana Herreras, Javier Ambrossi, Javier Calvo — La mesías (Movistar Plus+); Jaume Banacolocha, Joan Noguera, Montse García — Sueños de libertad (Antena 3); Xabi Berzosa, Sofía Fábregas — Cristóbal Balenciaga (Disney+)	Best Production (Entertainment): Corinna Sarsanedas, Anna Camprubí — Tu cara me suena (Antena 3); Arturo Valls, Jorge Pezzi, José Miguel Contreras, Bruna Hernando — That's My Jam España (Movistar Plus+); David Cardona, Ángeles Villamarín, Meritxell Struch — Supervivientes (Telecinco); Javier Tomás, Montxo Cabello, Georgina Rodríguez — I Am Georgina (Netflix); Jorge Salvador, Jorge Ventosa — El desafío (Antena 3); Patricia de Orive, Engel Serón, Cristina Benavente — El Grand Prix del verano (La 1)
Best Screenplay (Fiction): Javier Ambrossi, Javier Calvo — La mesías (Movistar Plus +); David Bermejo — Wrong Side of the Tracks (Telecinco); Jon Garaño, Aitor Arregi, José Mari Goenaga, Lourdes Navarro — Cristóbal Balenciaga (Disney+); Ramón Campos, Gema R. Neira, David Orea, Jon de la Cuesta, Javier Chacártegui — The Asunta Case (Netflix); Salvador Perpiñá, Amaya Muruzábal — Red Queen (Prime Video); Valentina Viso, Dani González — This Is Not Sweden (La 2)
Best Screenplay (Entertainment): Javier Valera, Diego Fabiano, Helena Pozuelo, Daniel Álvarez, Elena Beltrán, Javier Díaz-Pines, Xavi Daura, Sandra Flores, Manuel Álvarez, Yunez Chaib, Ignacio Rubin, Miguel Campos — La revuelta (La 1); Berto Romero, Rafael Barceló, Jùlia Cot — El consultorio de Berto (Movistar Plus+); David Navas, Eduardo García, Jose A. González, Irene Varela, Yaiza Nuevo, Diego Saucedo, Manuel Gay, Olalla Granja, Carles Sanchez, Jesus Torres, Carlos J. Pérez, David Dato, * Mikel Uribe, Iratxe Fernandez, Lucas Fuentes, Alberto Pérez El Intermedio (laSexta); Javier Pilar y Carlos Soria — El Grand Prix del verano (La 1); Laura Llopis, Fernando Acevedo, Sergio González, Juan del Val, María Dabán, Daniel Fontecha, Cristina Correa, Julia Alcocer, Juan Ibáñez, Damián Mollá, Jorge Marrón, Alberto Sierra, Jorge López, Juan Herrera, Antonio Tejerina, Miguel Gardeñes — El hormiguero (Antena 3); Lucía Carrero, Fernando Gamero, Beltrán Parra, Víctor Almazán — Joaquín el Novato (Antena 3)
Best Fiction: The Asunta Case (Netflix); Cristóbal Balenciaga (Disney+); Wrong Side of the Tracks (Telecinco); La mesías (Movistar Plus+); Red Queen (Prime Video); Sueños de libertad (Antena 3)	Best Show (Documentary): Cómo cazar a un monstruo (Prime Video); Acoustic Home (S3) (MAX, EITB); El caso Sancho (MAX); This Excessive Ambition (Movistar Plus+); Lucrecia: un crimen de odio (Disney+); Una historia de crímenes (Telemadrid, À Punt Media, Prime Video)
Best Direction (TV Shows): David Broncano, Ricardo Castella, Jorge Ponce — La revuelta (La 1); Alfonso Arús — Aruser@s (laSexta); Ángel Ludeña — Supervivientes (Telecinco); Gabriela Ventura — El Grand Prix del verano (La 1); Javier Coronas — Ilustres ignorantes (S17) (Movistar Plus+); Pablo Motos, Jorge Salvador — El hormiguero (Antena 3)	Best Direction (Fiction): Javier Ambrossi, Javier Calvo — La mesías (Movistar Plus+); Carlos Sedes, Jacobo Martínez — The Asunta Case (Netflix); Iñaki Mercero — Wrong Side of the Tracks (Telecinco); Juana Macías, Polo Menárguez — Las abogadas (La 1); Koldo Serra — Red Queen (Prime Video); Paco Cabezas, Juan Miguel del Castillo — The Purple Network (Atresplayer)
Best Presenter (Entertainment): David Broncano — La revuelta (La 1); Carlos Sobera — First Dates (Cuatro); Chenoa — Operación Triunfo (Prime Video); Eva González — La Voz (Antena 3); Pablo Motos — El hormiguero (Antena 3); Ramón García — El Grand Prix del verano (La 1)	Best Show (Entertainment): La revuelta (La 1); El hormiguero (Antena 3); El Grand Prix del verano (La 1); Ilustres ignorantes (S17) (Movistar Plus+); Operación Triunfo (Prime Video); Supervivientes (Telecinco)
Best Show (Dissemination): La matemática del espejo (La 2); 100% Únicos (Telecinco, Cuatro); Control de fronteras: España (DMAX); Cómo funciona, Madrid (Telemadrid); Generación porno (Prime Video, TV3, EiTB, and Telemadrid); Seguridad Vital 5.0 (La 2)	Best Show (Children): La casa de los retos (Boing); Aprendemos en Clan: La caja (Clan); Equipo Planeta (CMM); La pizarra mágica (Canal Málaga TV); Los argonautas y la moneda de oro (Clan); Samuel (Clan)
Best Show (News): Antena 3 Noticias (Antena 3 TV); Aragón Noticias 1 (Aragón TV); Informativos Telecinco (21:00) (Telecinco); Informe Semanal: 11M, el fin del silencio (La 1, Canal 24H, RTVE Play); La Sexta noticias (20:00) (laSexta); Noticias Cuatro (14:00) (Cuatro)	Best Camera Direction: Álvaro Santamarina — La Voz (Antena 3); Iván Prado, Vicente Peña, Ricardo Díaz — Supervivientes (Telecinco); Juan Gregorio Rodríguez — El desafío (Antena 3); Marta Fernández, Lara Vico — Gran Hermano (Telecinco); Mónica Artigas — Gomaespuma El Reencuentro (Movistar Plus+); Valerio Boserman — El Grand Prix del verano (La 1)
Best Presenter (News): Carlos Franganillo — Informativos Telecinco (21:00) (Telecinco); Alba Lago — Noticias Cuatro (14:00) (Cuatro); Alejandra Herranz por — Telediario 1 (La 1); Helena Resano — La Sexta noticias (14:00) (laSexta); José Luis Pérez — Trece al día (Trece); Sandra Golpe — Antena 3 Noticias 1 (Antena 3)	Best Show (Current Affairs or Magazine): Todo es mentira (Cuatro); El día después (Movistar Plus+); Espejo público (Antena 3); Y ahora Sonsoles (Antena 3); Madrid directo (Telemadrid); TardeAR (Telecinco)
Best Presenter (Current Affairs Shows): Silvia Intxaurrondo — La hora de La 1 (La 1); Ana Rosa Quintana — TardeAR (Telecinco); Joaquín Prat — Vamos a ver (Telecinco); Risto Mejide — Todo es mentira (Cuatro); Sonsoles Ónega — Y ahora Sonsoles (Antena 3); Susanna Griso — Espejo público (Antena 3)	Best Reporter: Almudena Ariza — Telediario (La 1); Alejandra Andrade — Fuera de cobertura (Cuatro); Jalis de la Serna — special correspondent (laSexta); Mónica Marchante — football broadcasts (Movistar Plus+); Pilar Cebrián — Antena 3 Noticias (Antena 3); Vicente Gil (posthumous) — Informe Semanal (Ukraine and Gaza conflicts) (La 1)

=== Jesús Hermida Lifetime Achievement Award ===
- Jordi Hurtado
