= Victoria Luengo =

Spanish actress (born 1990)

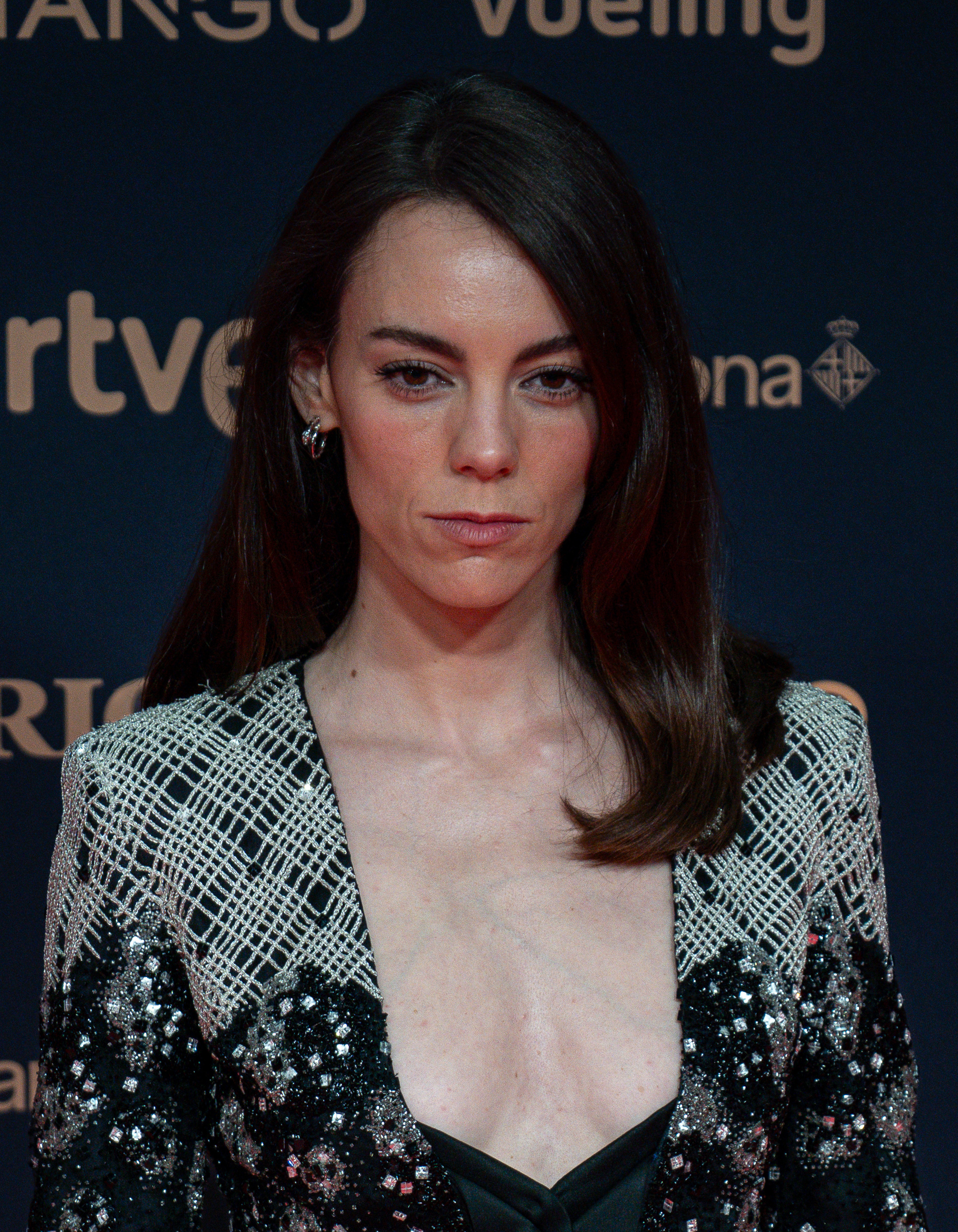
- Luengo in 2026
- Born: Victoria Luengo Saez; 7 April 1990 (age 36); Palma de Mallorca, Spain
- Other name: Vicky Luengo
- Occupation: Actress

Victoria Luengo Saez (born 7 April 1990), also known as Vicky Luengo, is a Spanish film, television and stage actress. She gained recognition for her performance in the television series Riot Police (2020).

She has since featured in films such as Girlfriends (2021), The Replacement (2021), Cork (2022), The Room Next Door (2024), Family Affairs (2024), Bitter Christmas (2026), and The Beloved (2026) as well as in television series such as Red Queen. She also received industry recognition for her role in the monologue play Prima Facie.

== Life and career ==
=== Early life and education ===
Victoria Luengo Saez was born on 7 April 1990 in Palma de Mallorca, but after four years she moved with her mother and brother to Barcelona, where she was raised. She took an interest in acting at a young age, and she got her first role in a stage play at barely 14 years old. She studied acting, dance and singing at the Barcelona's Memory School.

=== Career beginnings ===
She made her television debut as a background actress in Rumors (2006), later obtaining larger television roles in Hospital Central and La pecera de Eva. (Note: Since meeting in 2010 during the shooting of the latter series, she has been a close acquaintance of fellow actress Susana Abaitua.) In 2013, she joined the theatrical cast of Una historia catalana, a play staged at the National Theatre of Catalonia.

She starred as lead character in the French TV movie Carmen (2011), directed by Jacques Malaterre, also appearing in films such as La Trinca: la biografía no autorizada (2011), Born (2014; for which she won a Best Actress Award at the 2015 New York City International Film Festival), Barcelona Christmas Night (2015), The Laws of Thermodynamics (2018) and I'm Being Me (2020).

=== Breakthrough and consolidation ===
She had a breakout performance in the television series Riot Police, aired in 2020 on Movistar+. She portrayed Laia Urquijo, an Internal Affairs police officer who must investigate the potential misbehaviour committed by a squad of riot police officers during an eviction.

On 31 August 2023, Luengo debuted with the single-role of Tessa in monologue play Prima Facie at Madrid's Teatros del Canal, clinching an Actors and Actresses Union Award and a Talía Award for the role. During an interview to Cadena SER, she expressed her preference to be known to the public by her real name, Victoria, rather than Vicky, which she adopted in her early career because she felt back then that Victoria was a name for an old person.

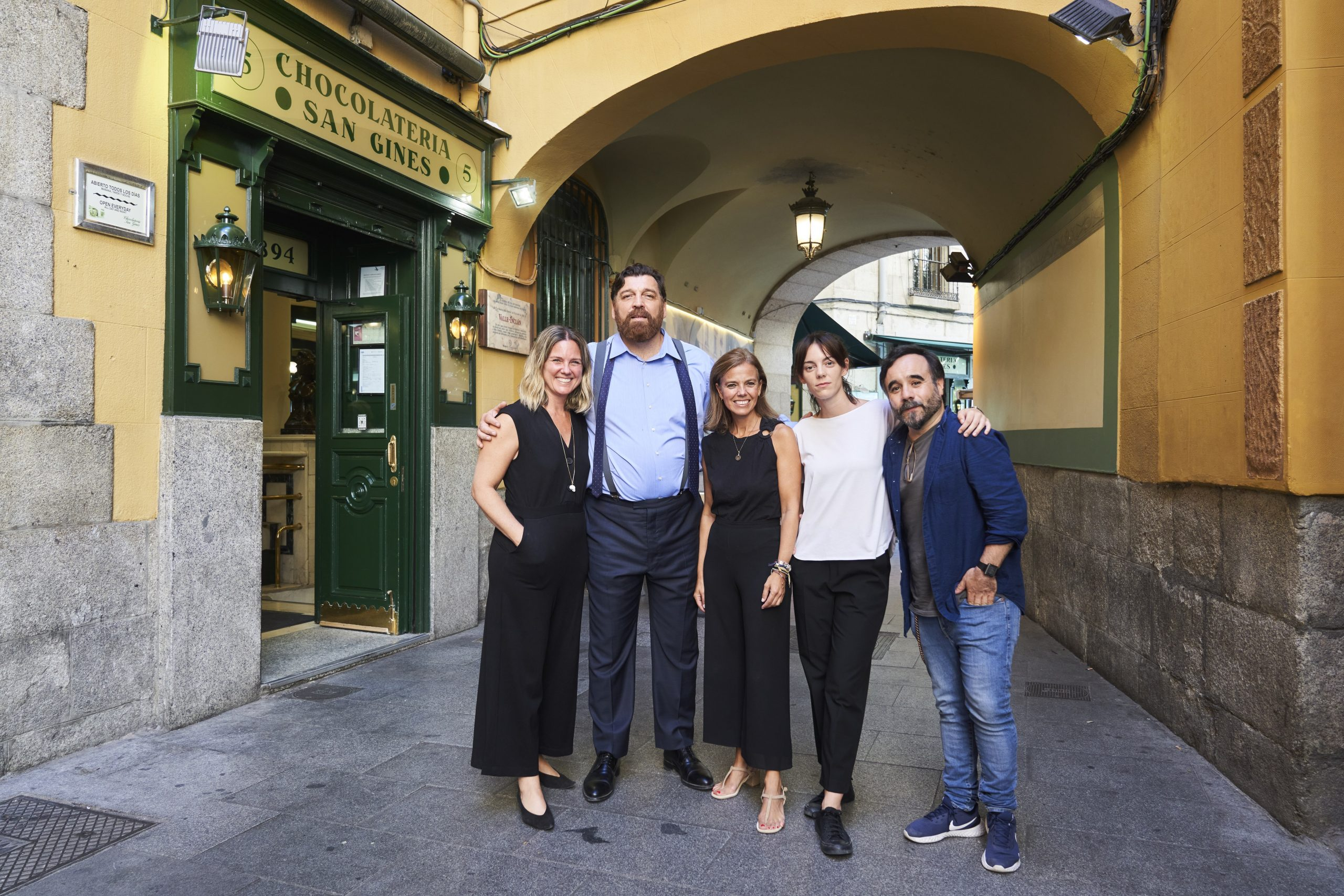
Luengo and Hovik Keuchkerian during a break in the shooting of Red Queen in Madrid

Luengo starred as high-IQ investigator Antonia Scott in the Prime Video thriller series Red Queen, based on the novel by Juan Gómez-Jurado. Released in February 2024, the series received mixed reviews, but Luengo landed an Iris Award nomination for Best Actress for her performance and the series was renewed for a third season before the release of season 2.

She appeared in a minor part in The Room Next Door, directed by Pedro Almodóvar, who had early considered Dua Lipa for the role. Luengo stated that she was directed "in quite a sensory way". Her performance in the English-language film earned her a nomination for the Actors and Actresses Union Award for Best Film Actress in a Minor Role.

She played a supporting role as a heroin addict in the miniseries I, Addict (2024), which was part of the official selection of the 72nd San Sebastián International Film Festival. Also in September 2024, she was reported to have signed on to star alongside Javier Bardem in Rodrigo Sorogoyen's The Beloved. In the film, premiered at the 2026 Cannes Film Festival, she played a struggling actress and estranged daughter described by Owen Gleiberman as exuding "a fascinating quality of pensive engagement" suggesting a more anxious version of Brooke Adams. In May 2025, she was reported to have been cast in a leading role in Pedro Almodóvar's Bitter Christmas. She described her character as a "broken woman, vampirised by a man". She was also cast in a leading role in Saints.

== Filmography ==
=== Film ===
Year	Title	Role	Notes	Ref.
2014	Born	Marianna		
2015	Barcelona, nit d'hivern (Barcelona Christmas Night)	Olga		
2017	Blue Rai	Lola		
2018	Las leyes de la termodinámica (The Laws of Thermodynamics)	Eva		
2020	Hogar (The Occupant)	Natalia		
2021	Chavalas (Girlfriends)	Marta		
2021	El sustituto (The Replacement)	Eva Vidal		
2022	Suro (Cork)	Elena		
2024	The Room Next Door	Fred's wife		
2024	Verano en diciembre (Family Affairs)	Paloma		
2026	Amarga Navidad (Bitter Christmas)	Patricia		
2026	El ser querido (The Beloved)	Emilia Vera		
2026	Sants (Saints)	Lali		

=== Television ===
Year	Title	Role	Notes	Ref.
2010	El pacto	Merche	Aired as miniseries	
2010	La pecera de Eva	Ari		
2011	Carmen		TV movie	
2011	Homicidios	María Losada		
2013–2017	La Riera	Míriam Ambrós Santacana		
2019	Secretos de Estado	Raquel	13 episodes	
2020	Madres. Amor y vida	Natalia		
2020	Antidisturbios (Riot Police)	Laia Urquijo		
2021	Historias para no dormir (Stories to Stay Awake)	Eva	Episode: "El doble"	
2024	Reina Roja (Red Queen)	Antonia Scott		
2024	Yo, adicto (I, Addict)	Rui		

== Accolades ==
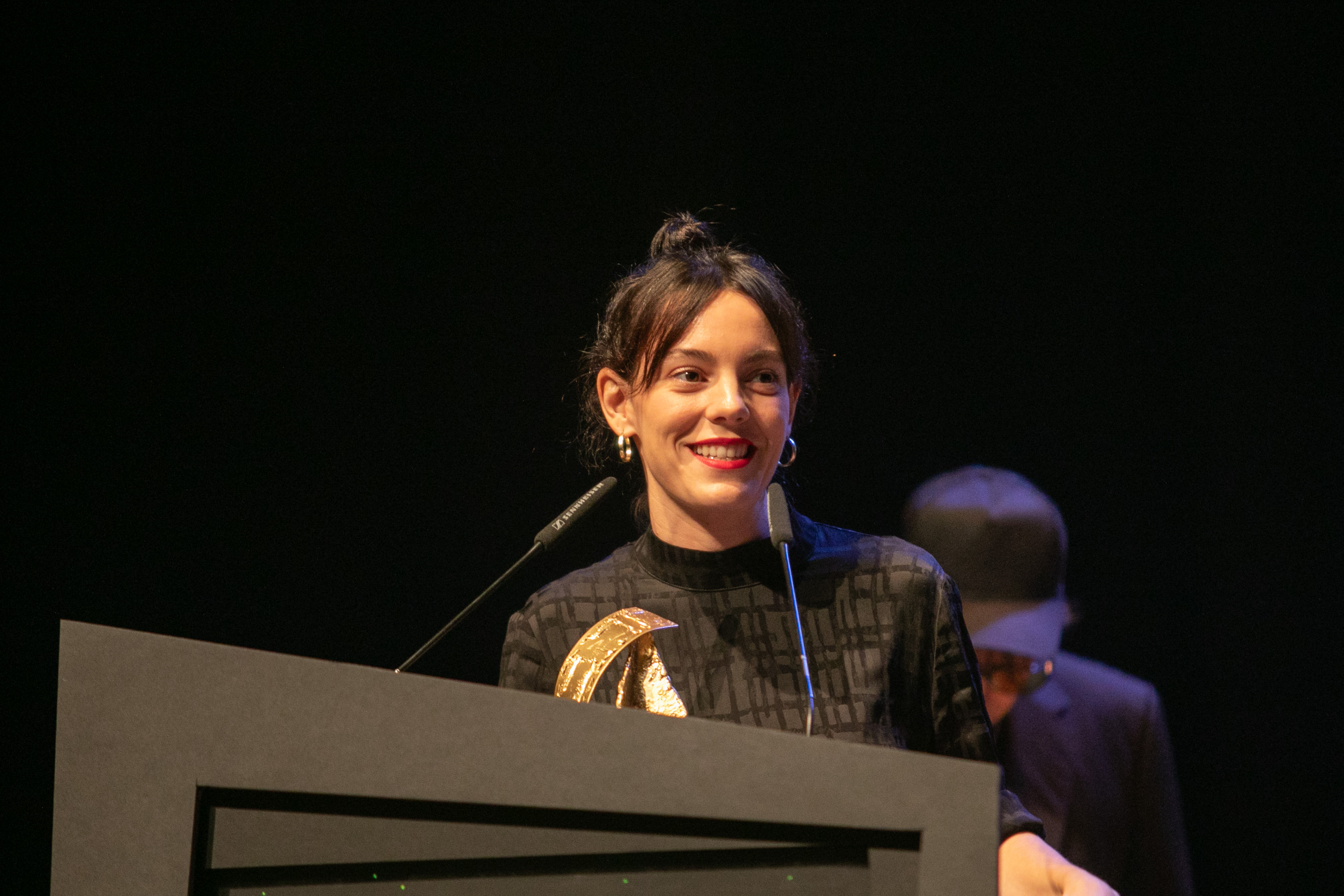
Luengo receiving an award at the CiBRA Festival in Toledo in 2022

Year	Award	Category	Work	Result	Ref.
2021	26th Forqué Awards	Best Actress in a Series	Riot Police	Nominated	
2021	8th Feroz Awards	Best Main Actress in a Series	Riot Police	Nominated	
2021	68th Ondas Awards	Best Actress in Spanish Fiction (TV)	Riot Police	Won	
2021	71st Fotogramas de Plata	Best Television Actress	Riot Police	Won	
2022	14th Gaudí Awards	Best Actress	Girlfriends	Nominated	
2023	15th Gaudí Awards	Best Actress	Cork	Won	
2023	37th Goya Awards	Best Actress	Cork	Nominated	
2024	32nd Actors and Actresses Union Awards	Best Stage Actress in a Leading Role	Prima Facie	Won	
2024	2nd Talía Awards	Best Actress in a Leading Role in a Text Theater	Prima Facie	Won	
2024	27th Max Awards	Best Actress	Prima Facie	Nominated	
2025	26th Iris Awards	Best Actress	Red Queen	Nominated	
2025	33rd Actors and Actresses Union Awards	Best Television Actress in a Leading Role	Red Queen	Nominated	
2025	33rd Actors and Actresses Union Awards	Best Film Actress in a Minor Role	The Room Next Door	Nominated	
2026	21st Rome Film Festival	Best Actress	Saints	Won	
2026	32nd Forqué Awards	Best Actress in a Film	The Beloved	Pending	
