= Ana López-Puigcerver =

Spanish make-up artist

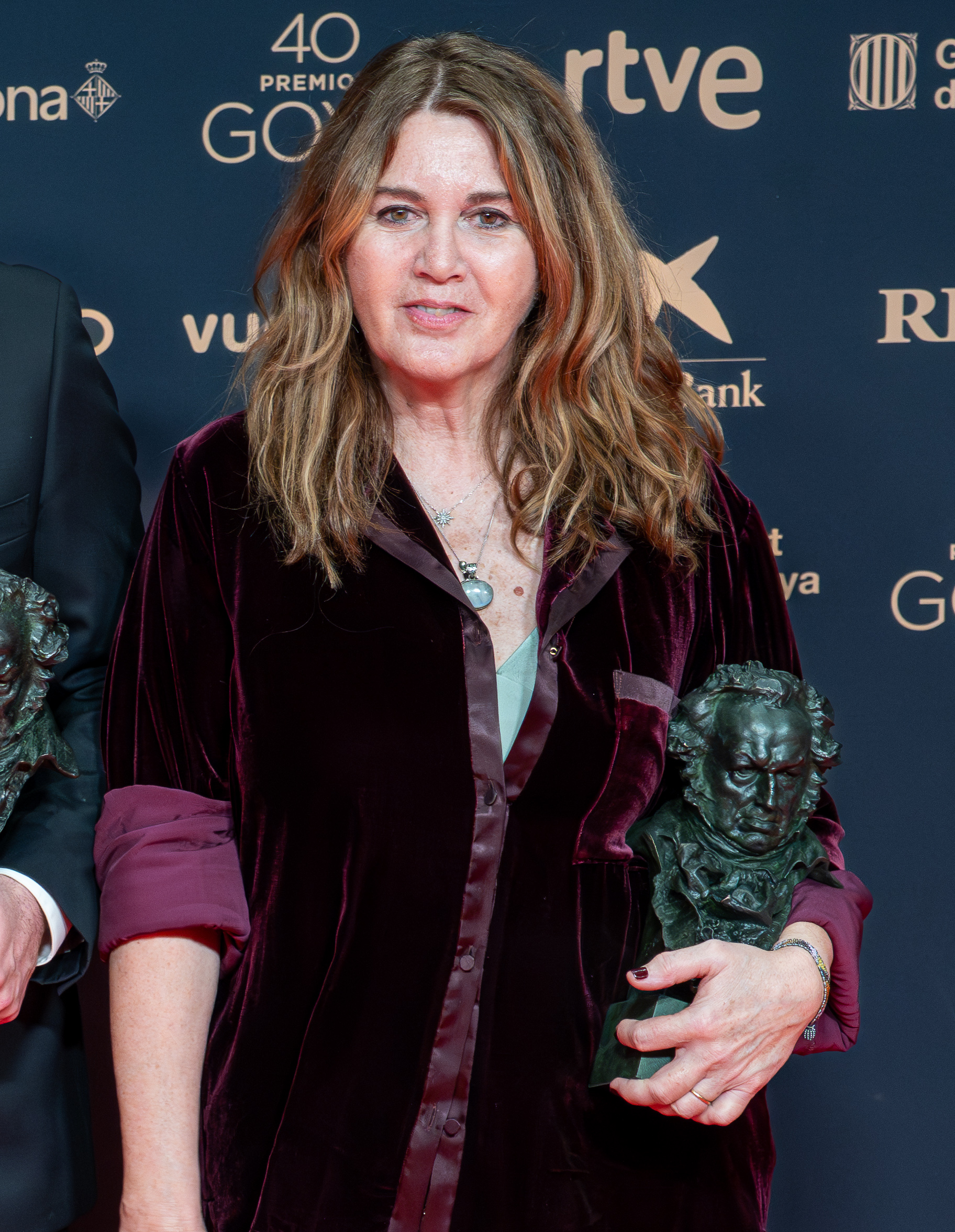
- López-Puigcerver in 2026
- Occupation: Make-up artist

Ana López-Puigcerver is a Spanish make-up artist. She was nominated for an Academy Award in the category Best Makeup and Hairstyling for the film Society of the Snow.

== Selected filmography ==
- The Titan (2018)
- The Laws of Thermodynamics (2018)
- Life Itself (2018)
- While at War (2019)
- Seventeen (2019)
- The Grandmother (2021)
- Society of the Snow (2023)
