= Maps to the Stars (soundtrack) =

Maps to the Stars (Original Motion Picture Soundtrack)

Film score by Howard Shore
- Released: September 9, 2014
- Length: 38:34
- Label: Howe
- Producer: Howard Shore

Howard Shore chronology
The Hobbit: The Desolation of Smaug (2013)	Maps to the Stars (Original Motion Picture Soundtrack) (2014)	Rosewater (2014)

Maps to the Stars (Original Motion Picture Soundtrack) is the soundtrack to the 2014 film Maps to the Stars directed by David Cronenberg starring Julianne Moore, Mia Wasikowska, John Cusack, Robert Pattinson, Olivia Williams, Sarah Gadon, and Evan Bird. The film's musical score is composed by Cronenberg's regular collaborator Howard Shore whose soundtrack was released on September 9, 2014, through Shore's label Howe Records.

== Development ==
Maps to the Stars featured an original score written by Howard Shore, who had been associated with Cronenberg in all but one of his films since 1979. According to Shore, the music had to work thematically with the characters and fit the film's subtext and encapsulate the emotion of the principal characters, which he does with all of the director's previous works. Cronenberg also wanted the music to be accurate and not just imposed throughout the film, which would be felt authentic throughout the film.

A non-album single sharing the same title as the film was released on May 21, 2014, in conjunction with the film's theatrical release in France. Howe Records distributed the soundtrack on September 9.

== Reception ==
A. O. Scott of The New York Times called Shore's score as "panicky" and "unnerving". Pete Simons of Synchrotones gave three stars, saying "[the score] manages to hold your attention even though it doesn't seem to be doing a great deal". Lee Marshall of Screen Daily wrote "Cronenberg’s go-to composer, Howard Shore, delivers one of his best scores yet for the dry Canadian maestro, a menacing undertow that picks up on some of the ethnic, New Age sounds of the world it depicts, but shifts them into Clockwork Orange territory."

James Southall of Movie Wave wrote "it ticks the boxes it tries to tick and does so very effectively and those with an ear for a more ambient style of film scoring will find one of the better examples of it in recent times." Michael Philips of the Chicago Tribune wrote "The score by composer Howard Shore adds just the right touch of forlorn mystery". Peter Labuza of The Film Stage wrote "Howard Shore's futuristic tones carry a hypnotic force that guides the film through its obsession with destiny." Oliver Lyletton of IndieWire deciphered it as a "cracking work" from the composer, while Geoff Pevere of The Globe and Mail called it as "near-ambient".

== Track listing ==
Maps to the Stars (Original Motion Picture Soundtrack) track listing
No.	Title	Length
1.	"Greyhound"	1:56
2.	"Set Me Free"	1:57
3.	"Stolen Waters"	2:22
4.	"Wildfire"	2:25
5.	"A Little Crazy"	3:21
6.	"Walk of Fame"	1:31
7.	"Fire and Water"	2:16
8.	"Asylum Corridor"	1:45
9.	"Brother and Sister"	1:06
10.	"Secrets Kill"	2:43
11.	"Burn Out"	1:57
12.	"Love Is Stronger Than Death"	2:32
13.	"I'm Sorry"	2:41
14.	"I Write Your Name"	3:47
15.	"Liberty"	2:10
16.	"Blanket of Stars"	4:05
Total length:		38:34

== Personnel ==
Credits adapted from CD liner notes.

- Music composer and producer – Howard Shore
- Soundtrack producer – Alan Frey
- Programming – James Sizemore
- Recording – Tobias Lehmann, Tom Russbüldt
- Mixing – Sam OKell
- Mastering – Simon Gibson
- CD editor – James Sizemore
- Music editor – Jennifer Dunnington
- Contractor – Joris Bartsch Buhle
- Executive producer – Joe Augustine
- Copyist – Amy Baer

Musicians

- Bass – Charnett Moffett, Christian Von Kaphengst
- Cello – Arthur Hornig
- Electric Guitar – David Torn
- Harp – Kathrin Jaeger*
- Percussion – Billy Martin
- Piano, Celesta – Nikolaus Resa
- Tabla – Soumitra Paul
- Viola – Christiane Silber
- Violin – Rainer Wolters, Nadine Contini

== Accolades ==
Accolades for Maps to the Stars (Original Motion Picture Soundtrack)
Group/Award	Year	Category	Recipient	Result	Ref.
Canadian Screen Awards	2015	Best Achievement in Music: Original Score	Howard Shore	Won	
Cannes Film Festival	2014	Cannes Soundtrack Award	Howard Shore	Won	
