= Ruben Wagensberg =

Catalan historian and journalist

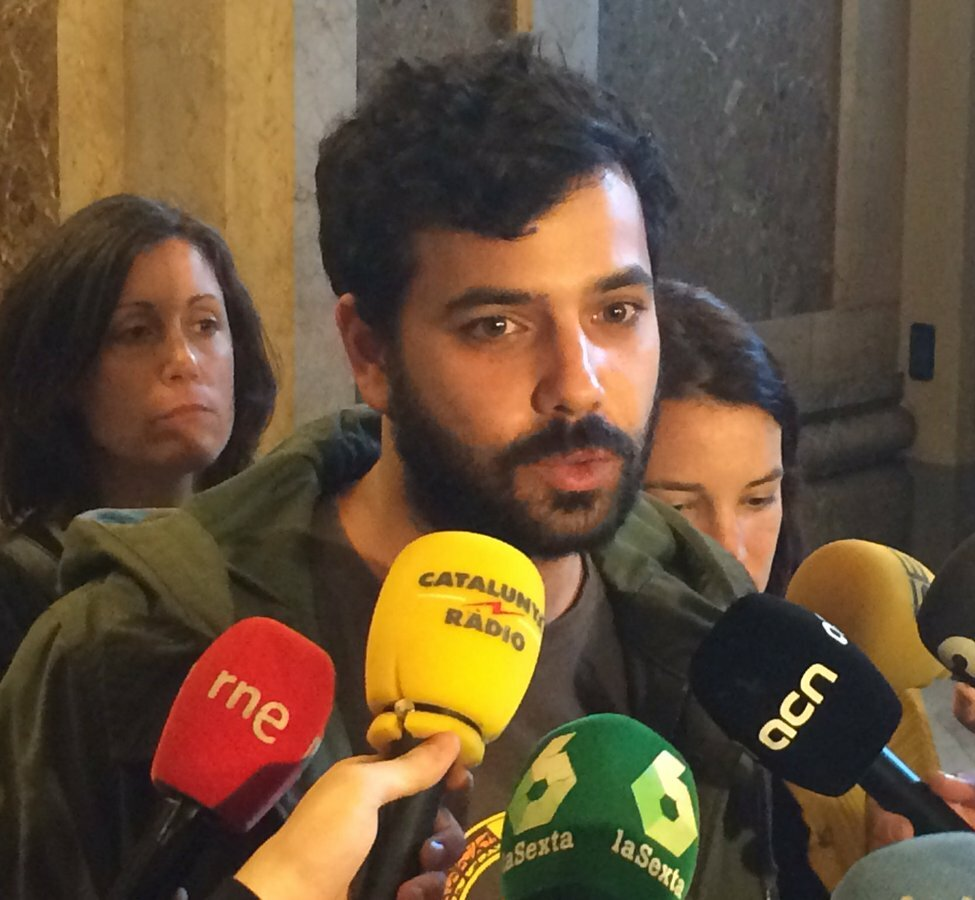

Member of the Parliament of Catalonia
- In office 17 January 2018 – 16 September 2025
- Succeeded by: Oriol López

Personal details
- Born: Ruben Wagensberg i Ramon; 10 September 1986 (age 39) Barcelona
- Party: Republican Left of Catalonia
- Occupation: Politician, Activist
- Known for: Volem acollir

Ruben Wagensberg Ramon (born 10 September 1986) is a Catalan politician and activist. In the 2017 Catalan Parliamentary elections, he secured a seat as a deputy on behalf of Esquerra Republicana de Catalunya. On 12 March 2021 he was elected to the Board of the Parliament of Catalonia.

Wagensberg is also known as the promoter and spokesperson for the "Casa nostra, casa vostra" (Our home, your home) campaign, which aimed to highlight and address issues related to welcoming refugees. The campaign's most notable event was the "Volem acollir" (We want to welcome) protest, held on 18 February 2017, in Barcelona. According to the organizers, the protest attracted 500,000 participants, while the Urban Guard reported a turnout of 160,000.

== Biography ==
He was born in 1986 in the Sants neighborhood of Barcelona, despite growing up in the Empordà, region in the north of Catalonia. His paternal grandparents were Polish Jews, who in the early 1930s fled Jewish persecutions in Poland and settled in Barcelona. There they set up a successful luggage factory. Additionally, actress Eulàlia Ramon is his aunt.

=== Activism ===
Ruben Wagensberg gained notoriety when, together with Lara Costafreda, he promoted the organization "Casa nostra, casa vostra" (our house, your home in Catalan) and the campaign "Volem Acollir" (we want to welcome in Catalan) after both participating as volunteers in the refugee camps in Greece. The campaign, which brought together more than a thousand organizations and more than 3000 volunteers, has had a great national and international impact.

Between November 2016 and February 2017, a multitude of activities were carried out throughout the territory to raise awareness about the situation of refugees. TV3 joined the campaign with a special program that included special reports, the live broadcast of the concert at the Palau Sant Jordi and the demonstration in Barcelona as well as the daily broadcast at the highest audience hours of the docouserie Vides Aturades, produced by the same entity. The educational community also participated in the campaign with actions in the schools of Catalonia.

FC Barcelona showed its support with a mosaic and a giant banner at the Camp Nou Mosaic during a semi-final match of the Copa del Rey against Atlético Madrid days before the demonstration "We want to welcome".

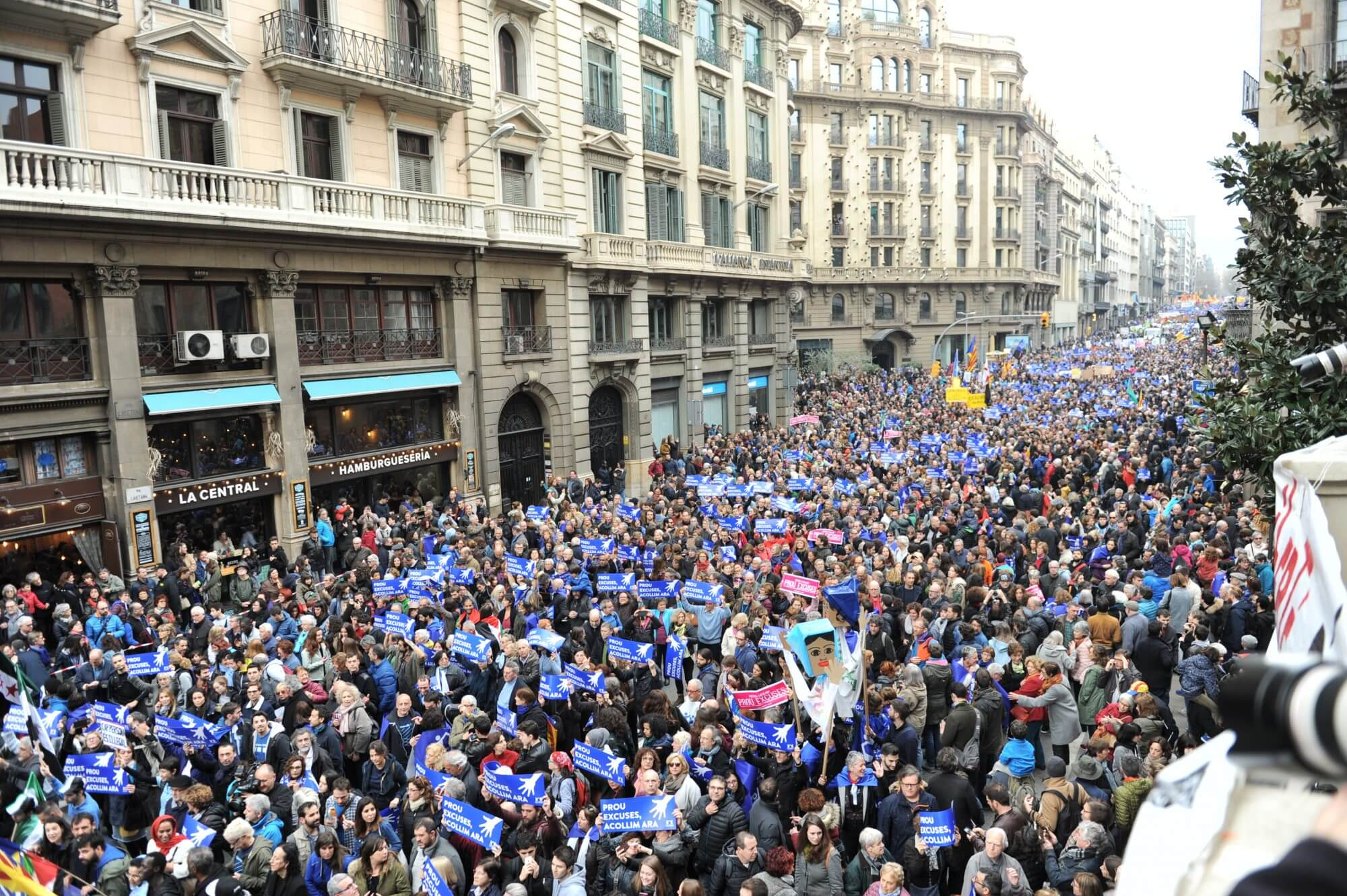
Half a million (according to the organizers) of people came out on the streets of Barcelona.

“Casa nostra, casa vostra” was the promoter of the “We want to welcome” demonstration, held on 18 February 2017 in Barcelona. According to the City Police, the event brought together 160,000 people and according to the organisers about 500,000. The aim of the demonstration was to ask the administrations and institutions to play a more active role in favour of the reception of refugees and migrants in Europe. They wanted it to be the most massive protest in Europe in favour of the reception of refugees and they managed to do so. On the same day of the demonstration, they published a manifesto with adhesions of 70,000 people and 900 entities. Some days before, a hundred mayors from Catalonia accompanied Wagensberg and made a call to attend to the demonstration at an event chaired by the Mayor of Barcelona, Ada Colau.

Wagensberg was the artistic director of the macro-concert that was held a week before the demonstration, at the Palau Sant Jordi in Barcelona with more than 50 artists such as Joan Manuel Serrat, Lluís Llach or Manolo García and an attendance of 15,000 people. The concert was performed in collaboration with La Fura dels Baus and Primavera Sound. During the concert, Jordi Évole criticized the performance of the Catalan institutions and Lluís Llach responded the following day by stating that all the ways of receiving them had been explored.

The TV3, Catalan most watched TV, broadcast of the concert was an audience success, reaching an average of 379,000 spectators, marking a 17.8% screen share.

15,000 people attended the macro-concert at the Palau Sant Jordi. On 15 March 2017 more than 121,000 signatures of the campaign manifesto were delivered to the President of the Parliament of Catalonia, Carme Forcadell.

In August 2021, with the return of the Taliban to Afghanistan, he moved to the capital, Kabul, to mediate between various international authorities, the Spanish embassy and the new Taliban regime to get the evacuation of 400 people, mainly women and children, but also of personalities at risk such as the UNICEF spokesperson in Afghanistan.

This same task was done during the beginning of the Russian invasion of Ukraine, when Wagensberg settled for two months between Lviv and Kyiv to collaborate in the evacuation tasks of refugees. In addition, he witnessed with prosecutors of war crimes, the opening of mass graves in Butcha and Irpin, north of Kiev, the week that Russian troops withdrew.

Throughout his political career he has had a strong link with Syria and Iraq, where he has helped find safe ways out for people who have suffered terrorist attacks from ISIL. In addition, he has promoted several development cooperation campaigns with the Kurdish authorities administering North and East Syria. However, he promoted the resolution of recognition of the Autonomous Administration of North and East Syria in the Parliament of Catalonia.

=== Accusation of terrorism and exile ===
In February 2024, the Supreme Court of Spain opened a criminal case for terrorism crime to Carles Puigdemont, former President of Catalonia, and Ruben Wagensberg.This indictment by the Supreme Court was made against the judgment of the Lieutenant Prosecutor of the aforementioned court. This prosecution was done against the judgment of the prosecutor of the Supreme Court, Álvaro Redondo, and of the Lieutenant Attorney of the same court, María Ángeles Sánchez Conde, who in the previous and final report respectively, ruled out the existence of the crime.

At the end of January, Wagensberg moved to Switzerland due to the judicial persecution of Judge Manuel García-Castellón of the Audiencia Nacional, who also began the investigation against the criterion of the prosecutor of the case, Miguel Ángel Carballo, to denounce in European institutions and international human rights organizations the political use of the indictment of terrorism.

Since the beginning of this indictment against Ruben Wagensberg and eleven politicians and activists by the Audiencia Nacional and, subsequently, by the Supreme Court, several international organizations have denounced the abuse of the application of terrorism to suppress peaceful protests.

On 27 February 2024, the European Civic Forum published a letter with the support of Amnesty International, the World Organisation Against Torture and 20 other human rights organisations that denounced this indictment. The day before, on 26 February 2024, 150 entities presented the manifesto “Protest is not terrorism” which also called for the withdrawal of the indictment of those accused by the Tsunami Democràtic. The manifesto was supported by more than 200 personalities including Carlos Bardem, Jordi Évole, Mònica Terribas, Andreu Buenafuente, Jordi Basté, Aina Clotet and Quim Monzó.

On 12 July 2024 he crossed the Spanish border and returned to Catalonia, after the court case was shelved.
