= Bitter Christmas =

2026 film by Pedro Almodóvar

- Theatrical release poster
- Spanish: Amarga Navidad
- Directed by: Pedro Almodóvar
- Written by: Pedro Almodóvar
- Produced by: Agustín Almodóvar
- Starring: Bárbara Lennie; Leonardo Sbaraglia; Aitana Sánchez-Gijón; Victoria Luengo; Patrick Criado; Milena Smit; Quim Gutiérrez
- Cinematography: Pau Esteve Birba
- Edited by: Teresa Font
- Music by: Alberto Iglesias
- Production company: El Deseo
- Distributed by: Warner Bros. Pictures
- Release date: 20 March 2026
- Running time: 111 minutes
- Country: Spain
- Language: Spanish
- Box office: €2.6 million (Spain) $6 million

Bitter Christmas (Spanish: Amarga Navidad) is a 2026 Spanish tragicomedy film written and directed by Pedro Almodóvar. It stars Bárbara Lennie and Leonardo Sbaraglia alongside Aitana Sánchez-Gijón, Victoria Luengo, Patrick Criado, Milena Smit, and Quim Gutiérrez. It incorporates elements of embedded story-telling and autofiction.

The film was released theatrically in Spain on 20 March 2026 by Warner Bros. Pictures, and subsequently had its international premiere on 19 May 2026 at the 79th Cannes Film Festival. It received positive reviews from critics.

== Plot ==
=== 2004 ===
In Madrid, Elsa, a director of commercials who has directed two feature films, suffers from a migraine during the Constitution Day long weekend. Her boyfriend, Bonifacio, a firefighter and stripper, accompanies her to a hospital. The next morning, Elsa returns home with Bonifacio.

Elsa visits her close friend Patricia, who is distraught after discovering that her husband Ricardo may be cheating on her. After suffering a panic attack on the one-year anniversary of her mother's death, Elsa goes to a psychiatrist and reveals that her mother died while she was shooting a commercial, and that she has not stopped working since then. Believing that Elsa has not fully processed her grief, the psychiatrist recommends that she go on vacation, preferably with someone else.

Patricia accompanies Elsa on vacation to Lanzarote, where Elsa begins work on her third film, focusing on two grieving women on a volcanic island. Elsa reveals that one of them is loosely based on Patricia and achieves liberation after divorcing her husband. Patricia, however, is uncomfortable with this revelation and is unsure about the future of her relationship with Ricardo. When Elsa brings up Patricia's tendency to stay in unhappy relationships, Patricia calls Ricardo and leaves the next day with her son.

Elsa calls her friend Natalia and invites her to join her on Lanzarote. Since losing her young son in an accident two years earlier, the grief-stricken Natalia has stopped working as a model and become withdrawn. During dinner at a restaurant, Natalia sees a young boy resembling her dead son and cries. Later, she attempts suicide, but Elsa rushes her to a hospital in time to save her. In an ambulance on the way to the hospital, Elsa receives a call from Bonifacio, who offers to join her on Lanzarote, but she says she must stay with Natalia following her incident, leaving him disappointed.

=== 2026 ===
It is revealed that Elsa's story is a screenplay being written by celebrated Madrid-based filmmaker Raúl for his latest film, Bitter Christmas, based on his own experiences in 2004 of having his first panic attack; she is his alter ego. His longtime assistant, Mónica, requests an unexplained sabbatical, promising not to abandon him and that his live-in boyfriend, Santi, will take over her duties, which Raúl approves of.

Some time later, Mónica formally bids her farewell and explains to Raúl that she is leaving to care for her friend Elena, whose son has been diagnosed with a tumor. Later, Raúl receives a call from Mónica, who tells him that Elena's son has died and she is on her way to visit them in Empordà. Upon returning to Madrid, Mónica calls Raúl saying that Elena recently attempted suicide.

Raúl has completed the first draft, which he gives to Santi for feedback, clarifying that Bonifacio is inspired by him. Feeling that the script is still short, he incorporates the scenes with Natalia at the end. After reading the script, Mónica confronts Raúl, furious that he has used Elena's suicide attempt to create the character of Natalia. Despite Raúl's protests that Natalia is different from Elena, Mónica threatens to expose his personal life if he does not remove Natalia from the story.

The next day, Raúl meets with Mónica at a park. Raúl, who has not made a film in five years, insists that he has finally struck the balance between fiction and reality. Mónica criticizes his writing, particularly the character of Bonifacio, and the way he uses other people's experiences as material for his script. She concludes that he is merely protecting the screenplay out of pride, not because he truly believes in its artistic value. Stunned by Mónica's change in personality and attitude, Raúl tells her that he should have sought inspiration not from the 2004 long weekend, but from the 20 years he has worked with her. Mónica leaves tearfully.

Returning home, Raúl begins a new draft titled Sweet Elsa, with Elsa inspired by Mónica. When asked by Santi about the conclusion of Bonifacio's arc, Raúl tells him that he does not know, and can only know if he writes without interruption, a request Santi complies with.

== Cast ==
- Bárbara Lennie as Elsa
- Leonardo Sbaraglia as Raúl
- Aitana Sánchez-Gijón as Mónica
- Victoria Luengo as Patricia
- Patrick Criado as Bonifacio
- Milena Smit as Natalia
- Quim Gutiérrez as Santi
- Rossy de Palma as Gabriela
- Carmen Machi as Dr. García
- Gloria Muñoz as Elsa's mother
- Amaia Romero as herself

== Production ==
In an interview to IndieWire published in October 2024, Almodóvar pitched Bitter Christmas as "a tragic comedy about gender". In May 2025, Victoria Luengo and Patrick Criado were reported to have been cast. Filming began on 9 June 2025, with Pau Esteve Birba serving as cinematographer. Additional cast members including Bárbara Lennie, Quim Gutiérrez, Leonardo Sbaraglia, Milena Smit, and Aitana Sánchez-Gijón were subsequently reported. The film is an El Deseo production and it had the collaboration of Movistar Plus+. Shooting wrapped on 12 August 2025 in Lanzarote. Shooting locations also included Madrid. Teresa Font took over film editing during post-production.

Almodóvar billed Bitter Christmas as "the film where I've been cruelest with myself".

== Release ==
Gutiérrez, Sánchez-Gijón, Sbaraglia, Almodóvar, Lennie, and Criado presenting the film at the 2026 Cannes Film Festival

Warner Bros. Pictures released Bitter Christmas in Spanish theatres on 20 March 2026. It will later be released on streamer Movistar Plus+. Curzon acquired distribution rights for the United Kingdom and Ireland, scheduling a 28 August 2026 theatrical release. In August 2025, Sony Pictures Classics, Almodóvar's recurring North American distributor, acquired distribution rights to the film in that territory.

The film had its international premiere in the main competition of the 79th Cannes Film Festival on 19 May 2026, where competed for the Palme d'Or and won the Cannes Soundtrack Award. The film's international festival run continued with selections for screenings in the 'Horizons' slate of the 60th Karlovy Vary International Film Festival, in the 'Special Presentations' slate of the 2026 Toronto International Film Festival (for its North American premiere), in the 'Made in Spain' section of the 74th San Sebastián International Film Festival, at the 2026 Vancouver International Film Festival, in the main slate of the 2026 New York Film Festival (for its U.S. premiere), and at the 62nd Chicago International Film Festival.

Pathé handled French distribution, programming a 20 May 2026 rollout in French theatres. Warner Bros. also handled Latin American and Italian distribution, scheduling a theatrical release on 21 May in Italy and on 28 May in Mexico, Argentina, and Brazil. Falcon Pictures acquired Indonesian rights to the film.

== Reception ==
=== Box office ===
==== Domestic ====
Bitter Christmas opened to a €728,038 (96,852 admissions) debut weekend at the domestic box office in Spain, posting a slightly better performance than Almodóvar's Parallel Mothers (2021) and The Room Next Door (2024). By its second weekend, it had grossed around €1.6 million. It added €120,400 in its fourth weekend to a total gross of around €2.3 million. The domestic gross clocked in around €2.6 million.

==== International ====
By September 2026, its worldwide gross revenue was $6 million.

=== Critical response ===
On the review aggregator website Rotten Tomatoes, 80% of 102 critics' reviews are positive, with an average rating of 7.1/10. The website's consensus reads: "A visually dazzling and effortlessly fluid late-period Almodóvar entry, Bitter Christmas charms with its well-crafted characters, comic rhythms, and nested storytelling." Metacritic, which uses a weighted average, assigned the film a score of 69 out of 100, based on 30 critics, indicating "generally favorable" reviews.

First reactions to the film were "largely positive" but "hardly unanimous", with fans lauding the "brutal honesty" while detractors resented the lack of "emotional impact".

Laura Pérez of Fotogramas rated the film 4 out of 5 stars, highlighting the "brutal honesty of its director" as the best thing about it. Pepa Blanes of Cadena SER assessed that the film "features a remarkable and original structure", otherwise considering that Almodóvar has laid his soul bare, almost more so than in Pain and Glory. Andrea G. Bermejo of Cinemanía rated the film 4½ out of 5 stars, declaring it "a self-portrait of brutal honesty".

Raquel Hernández Luján of HobbyConsolas gave the film 68 points, highlighting Sánchez Gijón's character, and how, through her, the director "demonstrates a remarkable degree of self-awareness", while also missing in the film "[Almodovár's] raw passion of yesteryear", as well as a bit more of a sense of humour. Luis Martínez of El Mundo gave the film a 5-star rating, accepting it as a masterpiece insofar masterpiece be defined as a "synonym for risk and freedom, and as another way of describing something new". Manuel J. Lombardo of Diario de Sevilla gave the film a 2-star rating, lamenting that "everything worked and flowed much better" in Pain and Glory.

J. Picatoste Verdejo of Mondo Sonoro rated the film 6 out of 10 stars, lamenting that the film lapses into navel-gazing manierism through a narrative game that is both risky and botched. Carlos Reviriego of El Cultural rated the film 4 out of 5 stars, wondering which other film questions itself as clearly and vehemently as Bitter Christmas does through Sánchez-Gijón's character in a "memorable" final stretch. Marta Medina del Valle of El Confidencial rated the film 3 out of 5 stars, describing it as a derivative film, delighting as it elaborates in its musical performances, but which occasionally loses its way in self-indulgence when it comes to the self-portrait.

Quim Casas of El Periódico de Catalunya rated the film a 4-star rating, finding a "diaphanous, precise, serene" Almodóvar in the film. Alfonso Rivera of Cineuropa lamented that a self-absorbed Almódovar "appears to have lost the ability to create work that is interesting, fresh, moving and, crucially, entertaining". Carlos Boyero of El País decried the film as "yet another display of design in which the storm of emotions also seems contrived". Jonathan Holland of ScreenDaily billed the film as "multi-layered, cunningly crafted, melodramatic to a fault and interestingly unseasonal", but featuring "such an inward-looking approach" that the characters' emotions "seem to unspool in a hermetically sealed bubble".

International reviews were generally respectful for the film, although they were not particularly thrilled by it. David Ehrlich of IndieWire gave the film a 'B' rating, considering the film as "self-flagellating to the extreme but never the least bit apologetic", entailing an instance of "I yam what I yam autofiction at its finest". Stephanie Zacharek of Time assessed that while the film "may not be as thoughtful or deep as it strives to be", "it's hard to get enough of the too-muchness of Almodóvar". Gaël Golhen of Première rated the film 4 out of 5 stars, deeming it to be "less pleasant but more honest [than Pain and Glory]. And almost greater".

Diego Brodersen of Página|12 gave the film a 8-point score, writing that it is in the third act "when emotion surges forth with intensity and once again puts the creator's place in the world around them and their connection with those closest to them under strain". Alejandro Lingenti of La Nación gave the film 4 out of 5 stars ('very good'), considering that the story unfolds into "in a sophisticated narrative device" "for rethinking artistic appropriation, emotional vampirism and the ethics of autofiction".

Alison Willmore of Vulture pointed out that everything interesting going on in the film happens in the last act, tentatively assessing that what "Almodóvar pulls off in the end makes the [otherwise difficult to watch] rest of the film worthwhile, but only barely". Summing the film as 'More pain, less glory', David Rooney of The Hollywood Reporter considered it "a customarily elegant exercise", "intricately structured" yet, staying aloof for the audience, "compelling but seldom affecting".

Robbie Collin of The Telegraph rated the film 3 out of 5 stars, declaring it both "complacent" and "a spry deconstruction of artistic complacency", while Vanessa Thorpe of The Observer described the film as "a witty and sensitive mea culpa that leaves no bitter aftertaste". Helen O'Hara of Empire rated the film 3 out of 5 stars, considering that while "it is no hardship to spend time with these characters", the film deserved a stronger finish. Justin Chang of The New Yorker billed the film as "a dizzyingly intricate meditation on the artist's compulsion to spin truth into fiction". Armond White of National Review berated Bitter Christmas as the "least impassioned film Almodóvar has made", otherwise also finding alarming how the filmmaker "succumbs to patronizing political trends".

=== Accolades ===
Award	Date of ceremony	Category	Recipient(s)	Result	Ref.
Cannes Film Festival	23 May 2026	Cannes Soundtrack Award	Alberto Iglesias	Won	
European Film Awards	16 January 2027	Best European Composer	Alberto Iglesias	Pending	

== See also ==
- List of Spanish films of 2026
