= Red Queen (TV series) =

Spanish thriller television series

- Promotional release poster
- Spanish: Reina Roja
- Based on: Reina roja by Juan Gómez-Jurado
- Screenplay by: Amaya Muruzábal; Salvador Perpiñá
- Directed by: Koldo Serra
- Starring: Vicky Luengo; Hovik Keuchkerian; Alex Brendemühl; Nacho Fresneda
- Countries of origin: Mexico; Spain
- Original language: Spanish
- No. of seasons: 2
- No. of episodes: 13

Production
- Executive producer: Amaya Muruzábal
- Production companies: Dopamine; Focus

Original release
- Network: Amazon Prime Video
- Release: 29 February 2024

Red Queen (Spanish: Reina Roja) is a thriller television series directed by Koldo Serra based on the novel of the same name by Juan Gómez-Jurado. It stars Vicky Luengo and Hovik Keuchkerian.

== Plot ==
The world's most intelligent person, Antonia Scott, is coaxed out of her hermit-like retreat to be partnered with gay Basque police agent Jon Gutiérrez after the killing of the son of a wealthy family and the kidnapping of a wealthy heiress.

== Cast ==
- Vicky Luengo as Antonia Scott
- Hovik Keuchkerian as Jon Gutiérrez
- Àlex Brendemühl as Mentor
- Nacho Fresneda as Ezequiel
- Emma Suárez as Laura Trueba
- Eduardo Noriega as Jaume Soler
- Urko Olazabal as Parra
- Selam Ortega as Ladybug
- Andrea Trepat as Sandra
- Celia Freijeiro as Carla Ortiz
- Vicenta N'Dongo as Aguado
- Karmele Larrinaga as Maritxu
- Pere Brasó as Bruno Lejarreta
- Fernando Guallar as Jurado Tomás

== Episodes ==
=== Series overview ===
Series	Episodes	Originally released
1	7	29 February 2024
2	6	2 October 2026

=== Season 1 (2024) ===
No.	Title	Directed by	Written by	Original release date
1	"A Leap into the Void" (Un salto al vacío)	Koldo Serra	Salvador Perpiñá	29 February 2024
2	"A Beginning" (Un comienzo)	Koldo Serra	Salvador Perpiñá	29 February 2024
3	"A Scenario" (Un escenario)	Koldo Serra	Salvador Perpiñá	29 February 2024
4	"An 'Action'" (Una acción)	Julián de Tavira	Amaya Muruzábal	29 February 2024
5	"An Icon" (Un icono)	Koldo Serra	Salvador Perpiñá	29 February 2024
6	"A Melody" (Una melodía)	Julián de Tavira	Amaya Muruzábal	29 February 2024
7	"A Mind" (Una mente)	Koldo Serra	Salvador Perpiñá	29 February 2024

=== Season 2 (2026) ===
No. overall	No. in series	Title	Directed by	Written by	Original release date
8	1	"(A Corpse)" (Un cadáver)	Koldo Serra	Salvador Perpiñá	2 October 2026
9	2	"(A Funeral)" (Un funeral)	Koldo Serra	Helena Medina	2 October 2026
10	3	"(A Container)" (Un contenedor)	Koldo Serra	Salvador Perpiñá	2 October 2026
11	4	"(A High)" (Un subidón)	Koldo Serra	Salvador Perpiñá	2 October 2026
12	5	"(A Dog)" (Un perro)	Koldo Serra	Helena Medina	2 October 2026
13	6	"(A Sunrise)" (Un amanecer)	Koldo Serra	Salvador Perpiñá	2 October 2026

== Production ==
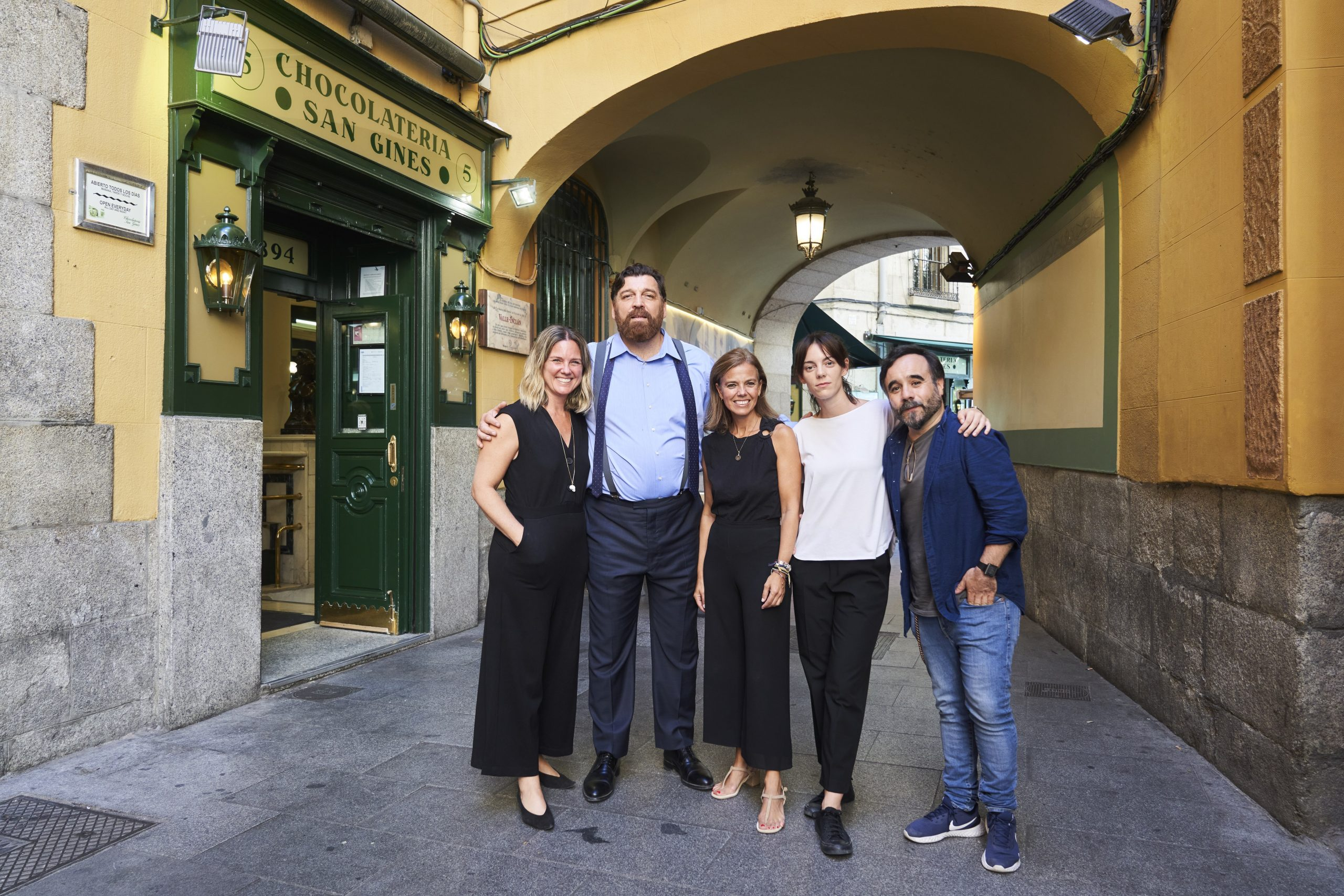
Head of Spanish Prime Video originals María José Rodríguez, actor Hovik Keuchkerian, Madrid municipal councillor Almudena Maíllo, actress Vicky Luengo and director Koldo Serra during the shooting of the series in Madrid in 2022

Based on Juan Gómez-Jurado's novel, the adapted screenplay was penned by Salvador Perpiñá and Amaya Muruzábal. The series is a Dopamine and Focus production. Shooting locations included Madrid and Toledo. The series consists of 7 episodes.

== Release ==
Amazon Prime Video released the series on 29 February 2024.

== See also ==
- 2024 in Spanish television
