= 4L (film) =

Spanish 2019 comedy film on Netflix

- Film poster
- Spanish: 4 latas
- Directed by: Gerardo Olivares
- Written by: Gerardo Olivares; María Jesús Petrement
- Starring: Jean Reno; Hovik Keuchkerian; Susana Abaitua; Arturo Valls; Enrique San Francisco
- Distributed by: Wanda Films
- Release date: March 1, 2019
- Running time: 104 minutes
- Country: Spain
- Languages: Spanish; French; Afrikaans

4L (Spanish: 4 latas) is a 2019 Spanish comedy film directed by Gerardo Olivares and written by Olivares and María Jesús Petrement. The plot revolves around Tocho (Hovik Keuchkerian), who is a rough, bad-mannered alcoholic; Jean Pierre (Jean Reno), who was once a womanizer but has matured; and Ely (Susana Abaitua). They are all travelling from Spain to Ely's father Joseba (Enrique San Francisco) who lives in Tombuctu, Mali, and is on his deathbed. They decided to travel there by using Ely's father's old car, a car in which they used to do road trips.

== Plot ==
As the plot begins, Tocho, a rough, alcohol-infused citizen of Bilbao, Spain, receives a letter telling him that Joseba, an old friend, is dying in Timbuktu. Deeply touched and nostalgic, Tocho travels by coach to France where he enlists another old friend, Jean Pierre, the owner of a vineyard, to join him on a trip to say goodbye to their beloved Joseba. Jean Pierre somewhat tentatively agrees, and the two men next visit Joseba's estranged daughter Ely to ask her to join them. To their amazement, Ely reveals that the old 1982 Renault that the three friends once drove across the Sahara Desert has been carefully preserved in her garage. She accepts their offer, if they will drive in the Renault from Spain to Timbuktu once again. With fond memories of their youthful adventures, Jean Pierre and Tocho agree to recreate the journey with Ely in tow. But the men and the car are older now, and times have changed. What was once a road trip of freedom becomes a journey fraught with breakdowns and stereotypical near-death moments in the desert. A Malian hitchhiker Mamadou is befriended by Ely, but dies of thirst when walking off to seek help when the 4L breaks down. There is an encounter in the middle of the Tanezrouft with a French trafficker who has a grudge against Jean Pierre, who stole one of his trucks many years ago. Arriving in Timbuktu the three travellers find an ailing Joseba and his Malian partner, and the closing scene leaves the four main characters promising to restore a riverboat on the Niger (in reality about 20 km from Timbuktu) owned by Joseba.

== Cast ==
- Jean Reno as Jean Pierre
- Hovik Keuchkerian as Tocho
- Susana Abaitua as Ely
- Juan Dos Santos as Mamadou
- Arturo Valls as Soriano
- Enrique San Francisco as Joseba
- Francesc Garrido as Alain / Akly
- Ileana Wilson as Maimona
- Eric Nguyen as Takimoto
- Antonio Engonga as Ekaley (as Antonio 'Tony' Engonga)
- Pablo Altadill as Álex
- Himar González as Supermoon
- José Luis Esteban as Recepcionista
- Boré Buika as Sargento
- Ibrahim Ibnou Goush as Policía puesto control

== Production ==
Filming took place over a period of eight weeks on the Spanish islands of Gran Canaria and Fuerteventura, as well as in Morocco and Senegal. The actors never visited Algeria, Mali or Timbuktu, as featured on screen.

== Release ==
Distributed by Wanda Films, 4L was theatrically released in Spain on 1 March 2019.

It was released on 12 July 2019 on Netflix.

== Reception ==
As of October 2021, 57% of the seven critical reviews compiled on Rotten Tomatoes are positive, with an average rating of 5.2/10.

== See also ==
- List of Spanish films of 2019
