= Eulàlia Ramon =

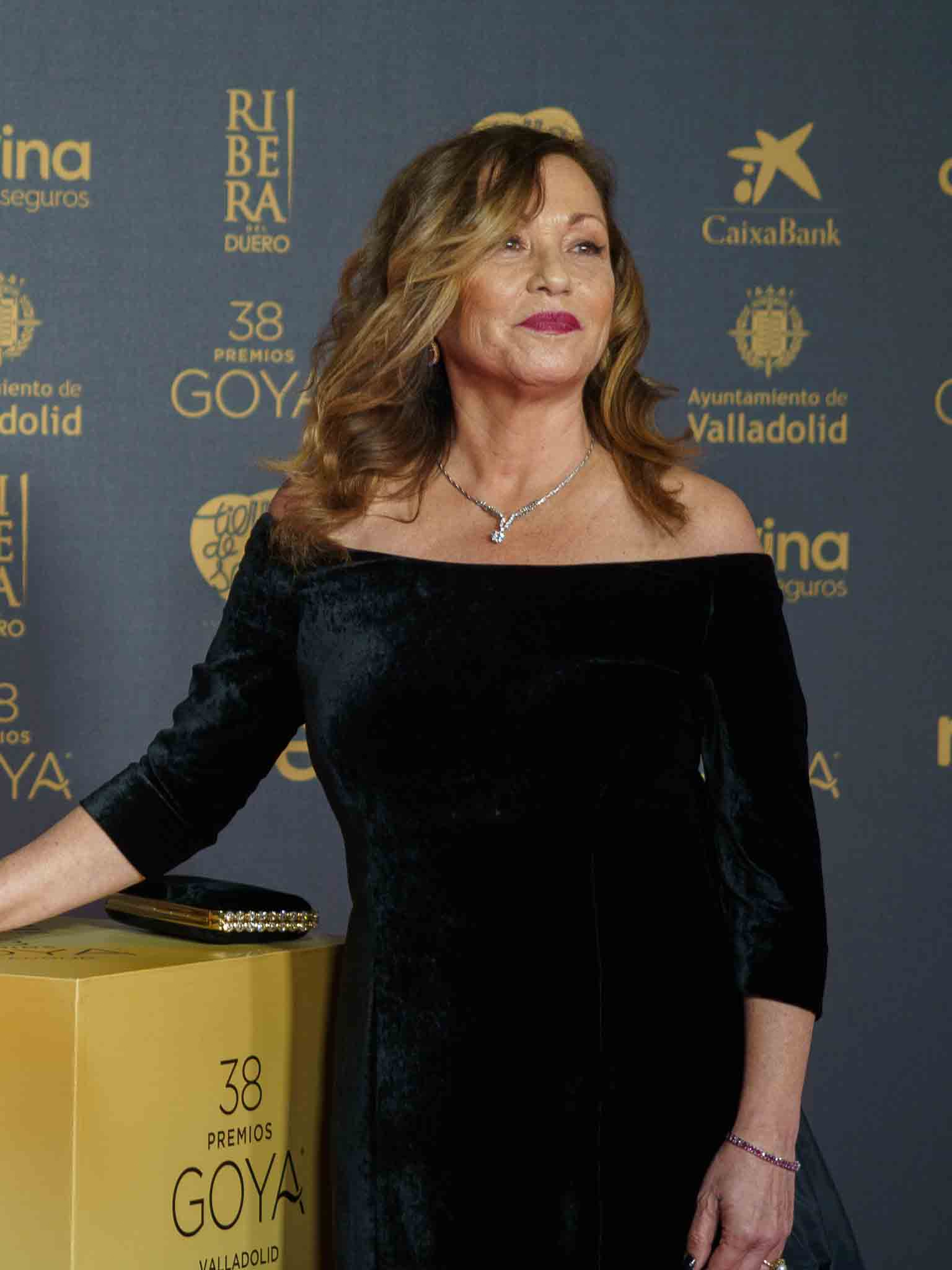
- Ramon in 2024
- Born: Eulàlia Ramon Estrach; 1959 (age 66–67); Barcelona, Spain
- Other names: Eulalia Ramón; Lali Ramón
- Occupations: Actress; photographer; director; producer
- Spouse: Carlos Saura (m. 2006)
- Relatives: Ruben Wagensberg (nephew)

Eulàlia Ramon Estrach (born 1959) is a Spanish actress, photographer, and filmmaker. She is known for her roles in films such as L'amor es estrany and Goya in Bordeaux.

== Life and career ==
Eulàlia Ramon was born in Barcelona in 1959. She was raised in between Sant Feliu de Guixols and Sarrià. She started a degree in journalism in Bellaterra but dropped out. Pursuing an acting career, she featured in the 1980s in films such as Fanny Straw Hair, Últimas tardes con Teresa, Matar al Nani, and The Sea and Time. Upon meeting during the shooting of ¡Dispara! (1993), she began a domestic relationship with director Carlos Saura, with whom she had one daughter in 1996 and married him in 2006.

She made her debut as a film director with the 2023 short film Divinas palabras starring Celia Freijeiro, Fele Martínez, and Marina San José, which was nominated to the Goya Award for Best Fictional Short Film.

She is the aunt of activist Ruben Wagensberg.

== Filmography ==
Year	Title	Role	Notes	Ref.
1988	Garum	Maia		
1989	L'amor es estrany			
1989	El río que nos lleva	Paula		
1990	Las cartas de Alou (Letters from Alou)	Carmen		
1991	Barcelona, lamento	Sonia		
1991	El rey pasmado (The Dumbfounded King)	Paca Távora		
1991	Fuera de juego	Susana		
1992	Después del sueño	Pepita		
1992	Los mares del sur	Ana		
1992	Un paraguas para tres	María		
1993	¡Dispara!	Madre		
1993	El pájaro de la felicidad (The Bird of Happiness)	Elisa		
1994	Souvenir	Mirita Marcos		
1995	El día nunca, por la tarde	Belén		
1997	Hazlo por mí (Do It for Me)	Nuria Robles		
1997	Pajarico (Little Bird)	Tía Margarita		
1999	Goya en Burdeos (Goya in Bordeaux)	Leocadia		
1999	Me llamo Sara	Susana		
2000	Adela	Adela		
2004	El 7º día (The 7th Day)	Carmen		
2009	Io, Don Giovanni (I, Don Giovanni)	Nobildonna		
2026	Sants (Saints)	Rosario		
