= Saints (film) =

- Catalan: Sants
- Directed by: Mikel Gurrea
- Screenplay by: Mikel Gurrea
- Produced by: Laura Rubirola Sala
- Starring: Victoria Luengo; Ariadna Gil; Eulàlia Ramon
- Cinematography: Julián Elizalde
- Production companies: Nocturna Pictures; Lastor Media; Deliris Films; Kino Produzioni
- Distributed by: Elastica Films
- Release dates: 24 September 2026 (Zinemaldia); 26 February 2027 (Spain)
- Countries: Spain; Italy
- Language: Catalan

Saints (Catalan: Sants) is a 2026 drama film written and directed by Mikel Gurrea. It stars Victoria Luengo alongside Ariadna Gil and Eulàlia Ramon. It is a Spanish-Italian co-production.

The film was presented at the 74th San Sebastián International Film Festival on 24 September 2026, vying for the Golden Shell.

== Plot ==
Set in the Sants neighborhood, the plot follows Lali, a woman who after years drifting around the world returns to Barcelona to take care of her dying mother Gloria. She joins a band of thieves of religious figures led by former nun Rosario.

== Cast ==
- Victoria Luengo as Lali
- Ariadna Gil as Gloria
- Eulàlia Ramon as Rosario

== Production ==
The project was selected for the 2014 TorinoFilmLab's Script Lab. The film was produced by Nocturna Pictures alongside Lastor Media, Deliris Films, and Kino Produzioni, with the participation of TVC, Movistar Plus+, and Filmin and funding from ICAA and ICEC.

== Release ==
Saints premiered at the 74th San Sebastián International Film Festival on 24 September 2026. Distributed by Elastica Films, the film is scheduled to be released theatrically in Spain on 26 February 2027. M-Appeal acquired international sales rights ahead of the world premiere. The festival run also included selections for screenings at the 62nd Chicago International Film Festival and the 21st Rome Film Festival.

== Reception ==
Jonathan Romney of ScreenDaily determined the film to be "uneven, never managing to push its heist dimension quite as urgently as its set-up promises", although conceding that the director manages to combine "dramatic tension with slow-building narrative looseness".

Alfonso Rivera of Cineuropa wrote that the film is "populated by surly, rough, abrasive and taciturn characters", lamenting that the shadows that envelop the actresses "ultimately end up eclipsing the emotional impact of the film".

Pepa Blanes of Cadena SER commended Sants as "a hypnotic film in which you follow the characters through all their vicissitudes".

== Accolades ==
Year	Award	Category	Nominee(s)	Result	Ref.
2026	21st Rome Film Festival	Best Actress	Victoria Luengo	Won	

== See also ==
- List of Spanish films of 2027
