= The Laws of Thermodynamics =

2018 Spanish comedy film

- Film poster
- Spanish: Las leyes de la termodinámica
- Directed by: Mateo Gil
- Written by: Mateo Gil
- Starring: Chino Darín; Vicky Luengo; Berta Vázquez; Vito Sanz
- Production companies: Zeta Cinema; Atresmedia Cine; On Cinema 2017
- Distributed by: Sony Pictures
- Release dates: 13 March 2018 (Miami); 20 April 2018 (Spain); 31 August 2018 (Netflix)
- Running time: 100 minutes
- Country: Spain
- Language: Spanish

The Laws of Thermodynamics (Spanish: Las leyes de la termodinámica) is a 2018 Spanish comedy film directed and written by Mateo Gil. The film is a romantic comedy, but is presented partially as a documentary with protagonist "physics geek" Manel attempting to explain the characters' behaviour and emotion using the laws.

== Cast ==
- Vito Sanz as Manel
- Berta Vázquez as Elena
- Chino Darín as Pablo
- Vicky Luengo as Eva
- Irene Escolar as Raquel
- Josep Maria Pou as Profesor Amat
- Andrea Ros as Alba
- Daniel Sánchez Arévalo as Daniel Sánchez Arévalo
- Alicia Medina as Modelo Anuncio
- Marta Aguilar as Chica Orgullo
- José Javier Domínguez as Camarero
- Txell Aixendri as Enfermera
- Carlos Olalla as Psicólogo

== Production ==
The Laws of Thermodynamics was produced by Zeta Cinema, Atresmedia Cine, and On Cinema 2017 and it had the participation of Netflix, Televisió de Catalunya, Atresmedia, ICAA and ICEC.

== Release ==
Distributed by Sony Pictures Entertainment Iberia, it was theatrically released in Spain on April 20, 2018. It was released on August 31, 2018 on Netflix streaming in certain regions.

== Critical reception ==
The film has received mixed reviews, and holds a 46% approval rating on Rotten Tomatoes, and a score of 45 on Metacritic. Critics tended to praise its original concept, but criticized the characterization and romantic plotting as shallow, with the LA Times complaining that "Gil’s overly clever notion wears out its welcome" and "Manel and Elena are wispily drawn characters with predictable arcs". Variety was more positive, calling it a "fizzing, restless, wholly singular fusion of physics lecture and romcom" stating also that "The love story and the academic treatise gradually impinge on each other more than they inform each other". The Hollywood Reporter likewise stated "Though it is intermittently witty, visually playful and laudable in its attempt to appeal to both head and heart, Laws abandons its characters to its big concept".

== See also ==
- List of Spanish films of 2018
