= Cannes Soundtrack Award =

Cannes Film Festival original score award

- Awarded for: Best Original Score
- Location: Cannes
- Country: France
- Presented by: Cannes Soundtrack
- First award: 2012
- Currently held by: Evgueni Galperine and Sacha Galperine for Minotaur and Alberto Iglesias for Bitter Christmas (2026)
- Website: https://cannessoundtrack.com/en/archives/

The Cannes Soundtrack Award is an independent award of the Cannes Film Festival dedicated to original scores from main competition films.

== History ==
Created by Vincent Doerr, the prize highlights music during the Cannes Film Festival. It rewards composers of films selected to the main competition. The award is given by a jury of independent journalists.

American composer Mark Snow was the first winner for Alain Resnais's You Ain't Seen Nothin' Yet, during the 2012 Cannes Film Festival.

Spanish composer Alberto Iglesias won twice for two films directed by Pedro Almodóvar, Pain and Glory (2019) and Bitter Christmas (2026).

Only two musicals have won the prize: Leto (2018) and Emilia Pérez (2024).

== Winners ==
Year	Winner(s)	English Title	Original title
2012	Mark Snow	You Ain't Seen Nothin' Yet	Vous n'avez encore rien vu
2013	Jozef van Wissem	Only Lovers Left Alive	
2014	Howard Shore	Maps to the Stars	
2015	Lim Giong	The Assassin	刺客聶隱娘
2016	Cliff Martinez	The Neon Demon	
2017	Oneohtrix Point Never	Good Time	
2018	Roma Zver and German Osipov	Leto	Лето
2019	Alberto Iglesias	Pain and Glory	Dolor y Gloria
2019	Jean-Michel Blais	Matthias & Maxime	Matthias et Maxime
2021	Rone	Paris, 13th District	Les Olympiades
2022	Paweł Mykietyn	EO	IO
2023	Mica Levi	The Zone of Interest	
2024	Clément Ducol and Camille	Emilia Pérez	
2025	Kangding Ray	Sirāt	
2026	Evgueni Galperine and Sacha Galperine	Minotaur	Минотавр
2026	Alberto Iglesias	Bitter Christmas	Amarga Navidad

== Other awards ==
=== Honorary prize ===
Year	Winner(s)	Ref.
2025	Cerrone	

=== Best Synchronised Music ===
Year	Winner(s)	English Title	Original title
2016	Bruno Dumont for the use of Guillaume Lekeu's "prélude du 2nd acte de Barberine"	Slack Bay	Ma Loute

== See also ==
- Academy Award for Best Original Score
