= Hovik Keuchkerian =

Spanish actor (born 1972)

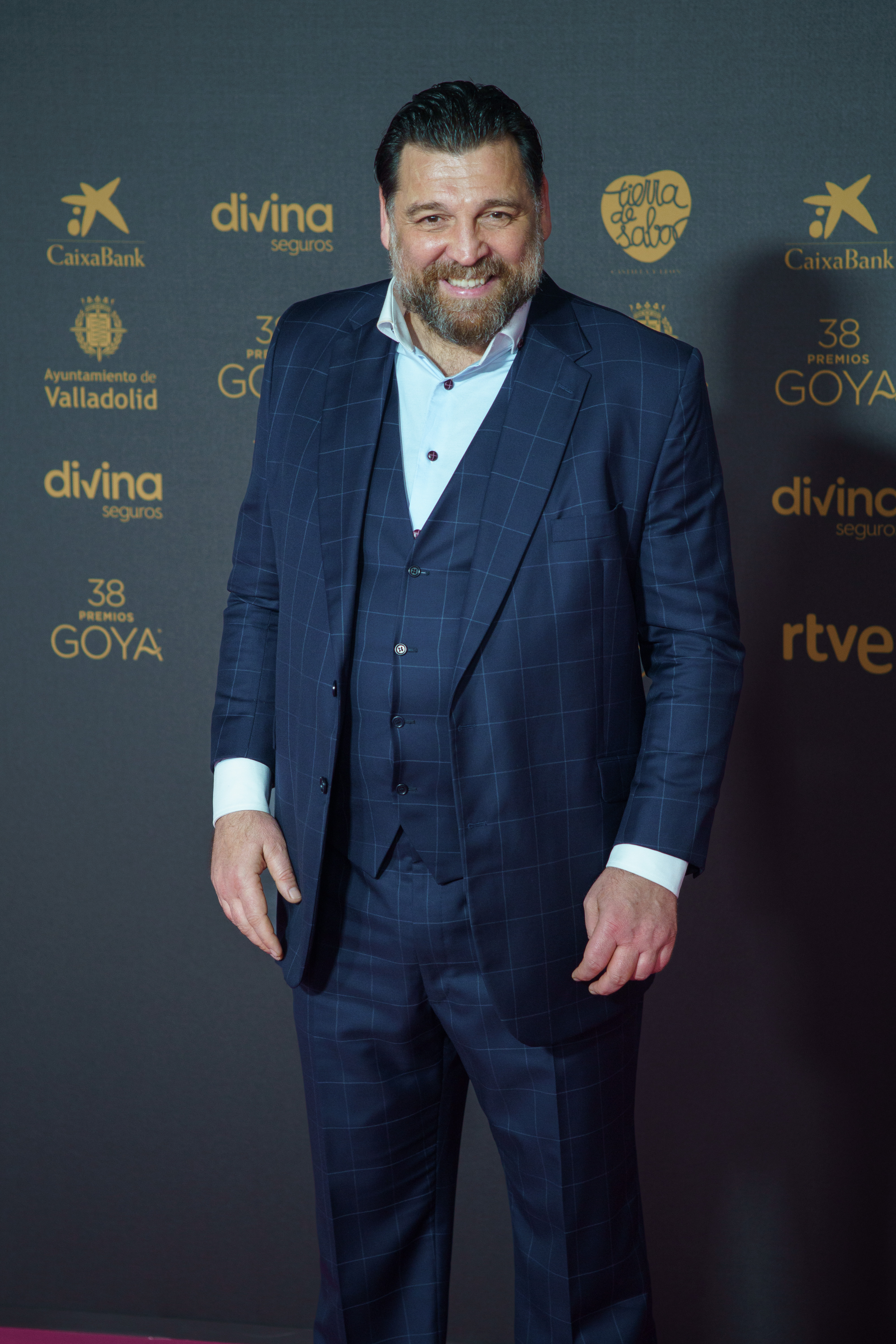
- Keuchkerian in 2024
- Born: Hovik Keuchkerian Burgui; 14 November 1972 (age 53); Beirut, Lebanon
- Occupations: Actor; boxer; stand-up comedian

Hovik Keuchkerian Burgui (born 14 November 1972) is a Spanish actor, stand-up comedian, and former boxer.

== Biography ==
Hovik Keuchkerian Burgui was born in 1972, to an Armenian father and a Spanish mother in Beirut, Lebanon. He moved with his family to Spain at age three and was raised in Alpedrete.

Keuchkerian is a former boxer. He became a boxer and was Spanish Heavyweight Champion twice. After quitting boxing, he started a new career as a stand-up comedian and writer. He has published four books, the last of them entitled Resiliente. His performance playing a boxing trainer in the 2013 film Scorpion in Love earned him a nomination to the Goya Award for Best New Actor.

== Selected filmography ==
=== Film ===
Year	Title	Role	Notes	Ref.
2013	Alacrán enamorado (Scorpion in Love)	Pedro		
2016	Toro	Antonio		
2016	Assassin's Creed	Ojeda		
2018	The Man Who Killed Don Quixote	Raul / Knight of the Mirrors		
2019	4 latas (4L)	Tocho		
2022	Rainbow	Diego		
2023	Un amor	Andreas		
2024	El hoyo 2 (The Platform 2)	Zamiatin		

=== Television ===
Year	Title	Role	Notes	Ref.
2010−11	Hispania, la leyenda	Sandro		
2013	Isabel	El Artillero	Introduced in season 2	
2015	El ministerio del tiempo	El Empecinado		
2016	The Night Manager	Tabby		
2018	Snatch	Carlito Blanco	Introduced in season 2	
2019–21	La casa de papel (Money Heist)	Bogotá	Introduced in part 3	
2020	Antidisturbios (Riot Police)	Salvador Osorio		
2022	The Head	Charlie		
2024	Reina Roja (Red Queen)	Jon Gutiérrez		
2024	Asalto al Banco Central (Bank Under Siege)	Bernardo García "Berni"		

== Awards and nominations ==
Year	Award	Category	Work	Result	Ref.
2014	69th CEC Medals	Best New Actor	Scorpion in Love	Nominated	
2014	28th Goya Awards	Best New Actor	Scorpion in Love	Nominated	
2014	23rd Actors and Actresses Union Awards	Best New Actor	Scorpion in Love	Won	
2021	26th Forqué Awards	Best Television Actor	Riot Police	Won	
2021	8th Feroz Awards	Best Leading Actor in a TV Series	Riot Police	Won	
2022	9th MiM Series Awards	Best Drama Actor	Riot Police	Won	
2023	71st San Sebastián International Film Festival	Silver Shell for Best Supporting Performance	Un amor	Won	
2023	29th Forqué Awards	Best Actor in a Film	Un amor	Nominated	
2024	11th Feroz Awards	Best Actor in a Film	Un amor	Nominated	
2024	38th Goya Awards	Best Actor	Un amor	Nominated	
