= Silvia Intxaurrondo =

Spanish journalist (born 1979)

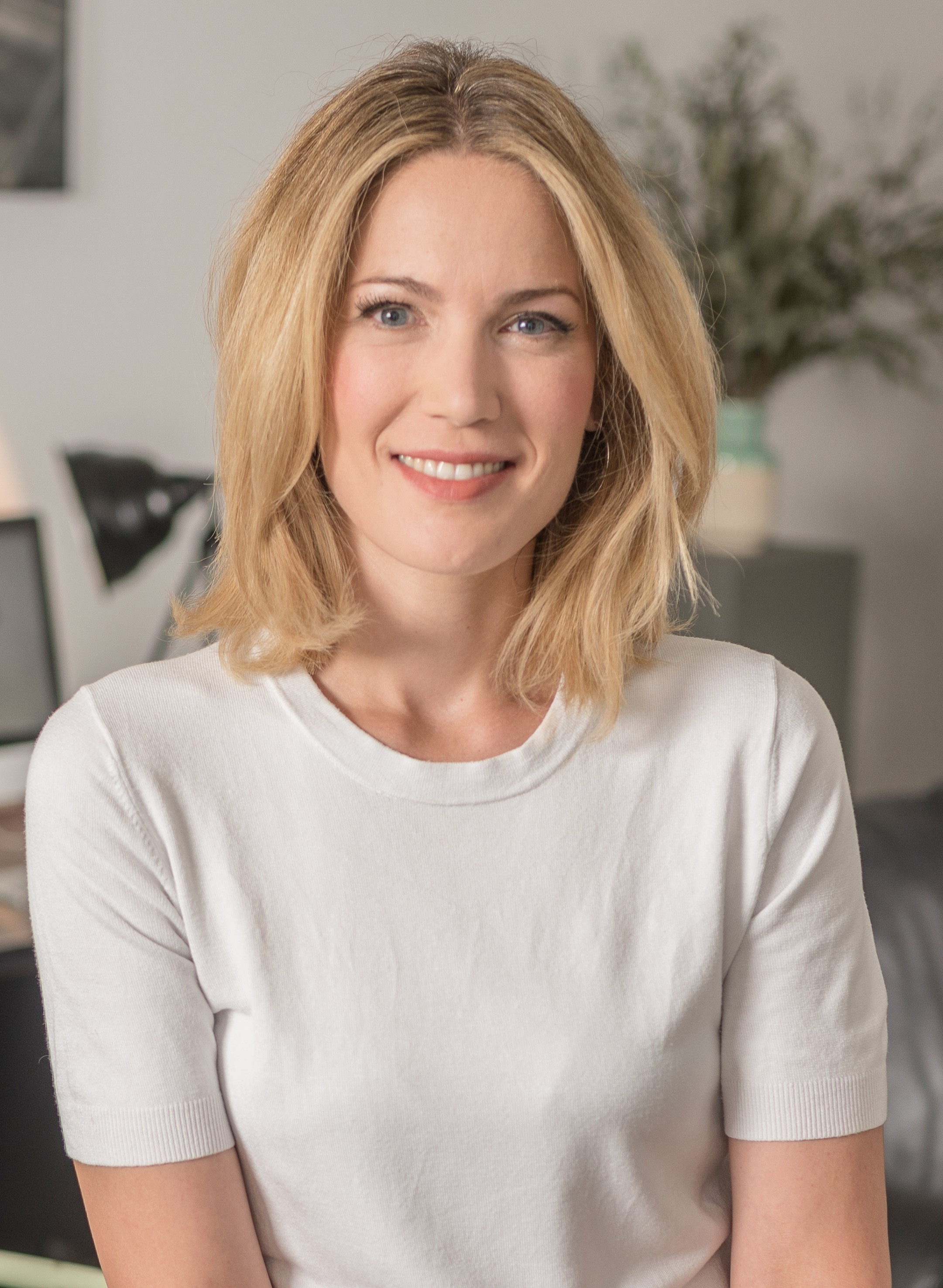
- Intxaurrondo in 2015
- Born: Silvia Intxaurrondo Alcaine; 24 October 1979 (age 47); Barakaldo, Spain
- Education: University of Navarra; Autonomous University of Madrid
- Occupation: Journalist
- Years active: 2001–present
- Children: 2

Silvia Intxaurrondo Alcaine (born 24 October 1979) is a Spanish journalist who works for the state broadcaster Televisión Española as the co-anchor of the weekday morning show La hora de La 1 on La 1. She had previously worked for the television news channel CNN+ in 2005 and again in 2010, for Cuatro in 2006 to 2007 and again from 2012 to 2013, W Radio in Colombia between 2011 and 2012 as well as the regional broadcasters EITB from 2014 to 2015 and Telemadrid between 2017 and 2021.

== Biography ==
On 24 October 1979, Intxaurrondo was born in Barakaldo, Spain. She had wanted to become a pediatrician but decided against it as she was wary of the negative implications if a child died. Intxaurrondo decided to aim for a career in journalism after watching war report bulletins when she was 14 years old. She graduated from the University of Navarra with a bachelor's degree in journalism and earned a master's degree in Contemporary Arabic and Islamic Studies at the Autonomous University of Madrid.

Intxaurrondo began her professional career interning at the radio broadcaster Cadena SER and was assigned to work on the morning programme Hoy por hoy for half a decade with Iñaki Gabilondo starting from 2001. She began reading the news on the news television channel CNN+ in 2005. For the 2006–2007 Spanish television season, Intxaurrondo was signed to co-read the news on the second edition of the Cuatro programme Noticias Cuatro with Gabilondo. She also returned to CNN+ four years later, working as a news editor and co-presenting the current affairs and discussion programme Hoy with Gabilondo in 2010. With the situation appearing bleak for television journalism, Intxaurrondo decided to leave the industry for radio. In June 2011, she moved to Colombia and joined the staff of W Radio to work on the morning radio programme with Julio Sánchez Cristo. Intxaurrondo also worked as a special envoy in Algeria, Colombia, Mexico, Morocco, Palestine, Senegal and Tunisia for W Radio.

She left W Radio in June 2012 and re-joined Cadena SER in Madrid on 3 September 2012, becoming deputy director of the programme Hoy por hoy, which was presented by Pepa Bueno and Gemma Nierga. Intxaurrondo left Cadena SER after 20 May 2013 because the management of Cadena SER terminated her contract following her refusal to accept a proposal for her to be transferred to another position within the broadcaster. Between 7 January and 26 December 2014, she worked for the Basque regional television broadcaster as presenter of the two-hour live current affairs programme ETB hoy on ETB 2. Intxaurrondo went on to present the ETB 1 weekly news programme ¡Por fin, viernes! from January to April 2015.

In September 2015, she returned to Cuatro and presented the current affairs debating programme Un tiempo nuevo, which she did until December 2015 when the show was cancelled. Following a break from radio and television programming, Intxaurrondo joined the Madrid regional broadcaster Telemadrid and worked as a news reader on the Telenoticias Fin de Semana programme from 23 September 2017. She combined this work with co-presenting with Paco Lobatón the research and public service programme Desaparecidos which was broadcast on La 1 between January and April 2018. She left Telemadrid in September 2021 and joined Televisión Española to work with Marc Sala and read the news on the weekday La hora de La 1 bulletins on 8:30 am and 12:30 pm on La 1. Intxaurrondo has also worked for El País.

== Personal life ==
She has two children. She is reticent about sharing aspects of her private life.

== Awards ==
Intxaurrondo was nominated for the Iris Award for Best Newscast Presenter in 2019 for her work on Telenoticias Fin de Semana. In 2020, she received the Premio 'Haciendo Historia' award from the Community of Madrid for "having carried out their work in "traditionally male" spaces and for their work "to achieve equal rights and opportunities between men and women." In the following year, Intxaurrondo was made a recipient of the Municipal Police Merit Cross by the Policía Municipal de Madrid.
