= La hora de La 1 =

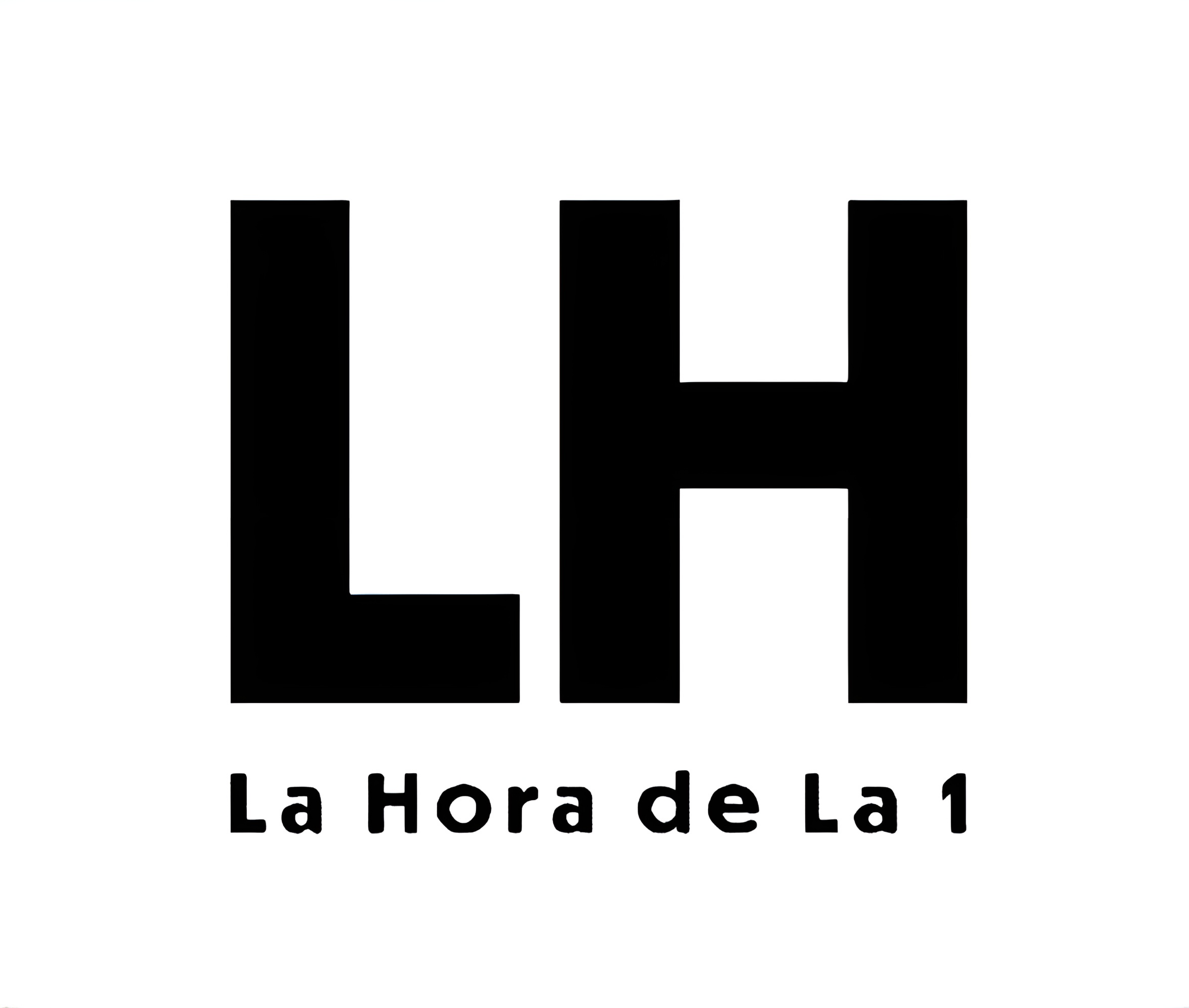
- Genre: Morning show; news broadcasting; talk show
- Presented by: Silvia Intxaurrondo; Marc Sala
- Country of origin: Spain
- Original language: Spanish

Production
- Producer: Hugo Mendiri Villarrubia
- Camera setup: Multi-camera
- Running time: 300 minutes (inc. adverts)
- Production company: Televisión Española

Original release
- Network: La 1
- Release: September 7, 2020

La hora de La 1 is a Spanish breakfast television news program, broadcast on weekdays on La 1 of Televisión Española from September 7, 2020.

== Format ==
La hora de La 1 is a magazine show broadcast live from Prado del Rey Studio 1, which addresses the daily news with content, organized by time slots, ranging from interviews and political debates to the social chronicle, through segments dedicated to economy, consumption, employment and housing; society, education, health, science, environment, events, human histories and public denunciation, and finally, culture and social chronicle. In addition, the show features live connections, spectator inquiries, and even comedy.

For its first season, the show was hosted by Mònica López. She was then replaced by Marc Sala and Silvia Intxaurrondo.

== Political interview ==
These are the political guest in the first week of the program

Date	Guest
7 September 2020	Pedro Sánchez
8 September 2020	Ana Pastor
9 September 2020	Ada Colau
10 September 2020	Santiago Abascal Isabel Celaá
11 September 2020	Salvador Illa
