= Volem acollir =

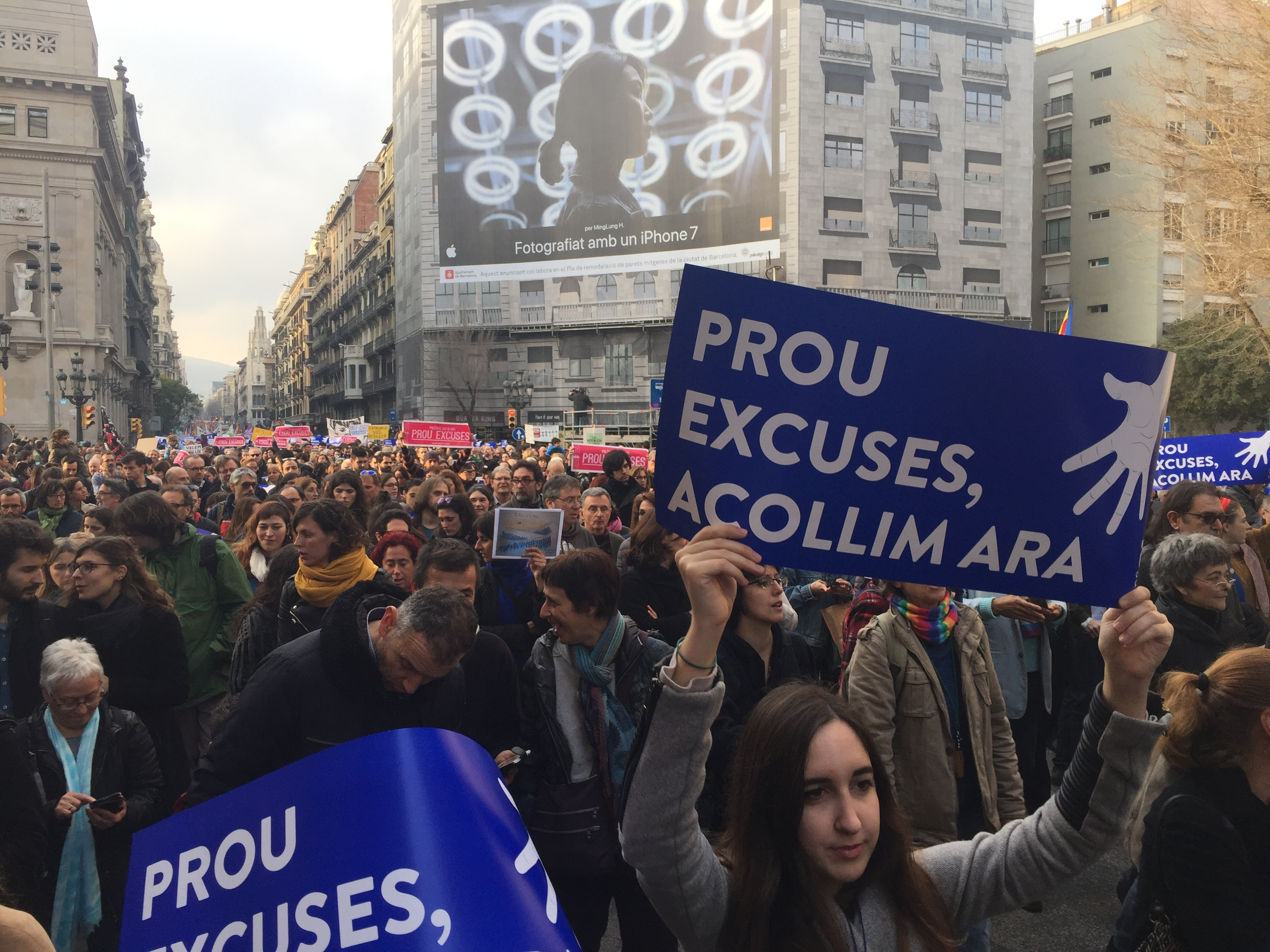
- Native name: Volem acollir
- English name: We want to welcome you
- Date: 18 February 2017
- Location: Barcelona
- Type: Protest
- Theme: Refugees
- Cause: Welcoming refugees

The Volem acollir protest (meaning "We want to welcome") was a protest march in Barcelona that took place on 18 February 2017. The purpose of the march was to demand more openness towards refugees and a more active role of the European Union in the European migrant crisis. They planned for it to be the largest protest in Europe. The size of the march was estimated at 160,000 by police and 500,000 by organisers.

== History ==
=== Concert ===
Days before the protest, a concert was held in the Palau Sant Jordi in Barcelona, with more than 50 artists and 15,000 attendees. During the concert, Jordi Évole criticised the government's inactivity. Lluís Llach, a former deputy of the Catalan Parliament, replied by saying that the government had explored all the possible ways to receive and welcome refugees. Days before that, 100 Catalan mayors called for people to attend the protest.

=== Editorial ===
On the same day, an article published by Ruben Wagensberg (CNCV coordinator), Jordi Cuixart (president of Òmnium Cultural), Òscar Camps (founder of Proactiva Open Arms), stated that "At the end of 2016, the Spanish State had only received 898 refugees, when it had agreed to welcome more than 17,000". The article claimed that it was everyone's responsibility, and encouraged people to attend the march in order for it to be a "historical reference point for ourselves, and also to develop similar movements all around Europe".

=== March ===
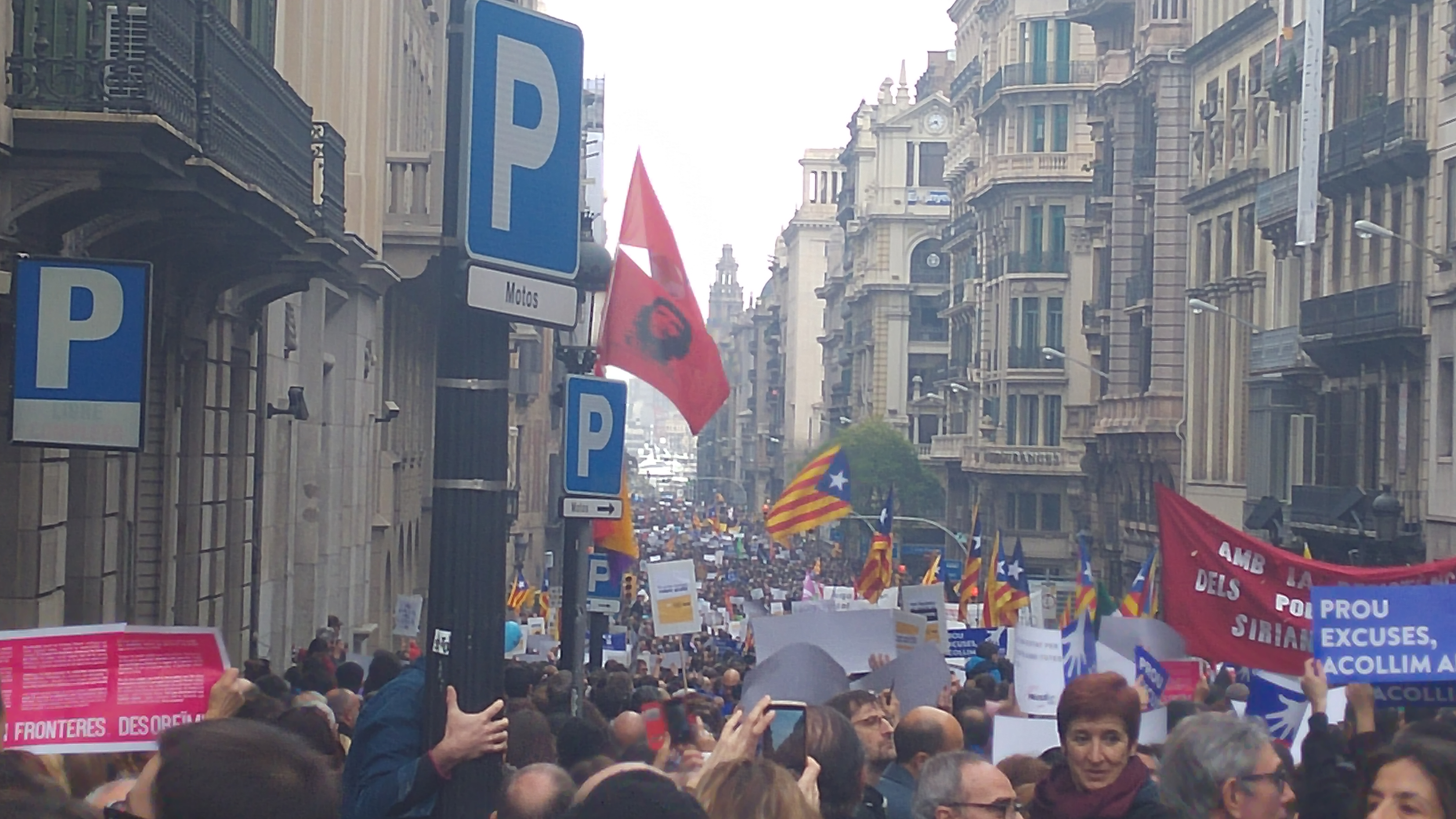

The march started at 4 PM in Plaça Urquinaona. The route passed through Via Laietana and Parc de la Barceloneta to get to Passeig Marítim. Due to the size of the crowd, when the first marchers arrived at the destination, others were still trying to reach Plaça Urquinaona.

The marchers carried three banners: the first one stated "Stop excuses. We welcome now!" ("Prou excuses. Acollim ara!") which was carried by refugees, immigrants and volunteers. The second one read "No more deaths. Open the borders!" ("No més morts. Obrim fronteres!"), raised by groups working to help refugees. The third was composed of civil society groups, stating "Catalonia, land of reception" ("Catalunya, terra d'acollida").

The president of the Catalan Parliament, six government ministers, Barcelona's mayor and numerous deputies of the Spanish Congress and the Catalan Parliament attended the protest. Representatives of all parties in the Catalan parliament, excluding the People's Party of Catalonia supported the march, along with social entities, trade unions, NGOs and the Archdiocese of Barcelona. At the end, the president of the Generalitat received the organisers at the Palau de la Generalitat.

The finishing speeches criticised reception policies and demanded changes. Ruben Wagensberg, the spokesperson for the organisers, demanded in the closing speech that they should stop spending public money on fences and that the European Union should sanction Spain for breaching the reception compromises. He called for a common front of administrations and entities to face down what he described as the wave of fascism in Europe. The refugees Dara Ljubojevic of Bosnia and Meere M. Zaroor of Syria also spoke. In the evening, la Fura dels Baus and Proactiva Open Arms acted out a rescue.

After the march, the president of the Generalitat, Carles Puigdemont, received the organisers, Wagensberg and Lara Costafreda, who proposed to make a social pact against racism and xenophobia. The same day Puigdemont sent a letter to European Immigration, Interior and Citizenship commissioner, Dimitris Avramopoulos, to show Catalonia's availability to receive refugees and explain that many entities were preparing to welcome up to 4,500 refugees. The same day, the Vice President of the Spanish government, Soraya Sáenz de Santamaría, rejected Catalonia taking the initiative: "an autonomous community wants to be the solution to the problem, and it can not be like that".

=== Elsewhere ===
Similar protests occurred elsewhere. A march in Mallorca was organised by the Moviment Escolta i Guiatge de Mallorca, involving thousands of people to walk from the Plaça Major to the Passeig del Born, where a manifesto was read. Dozens of people of the Alta Ribagorça gathered in front of the Romanesque church Sant Climent de Taüll to show support.
