= Koldo Serra =

Basque film director and screenwriter (born 1975)

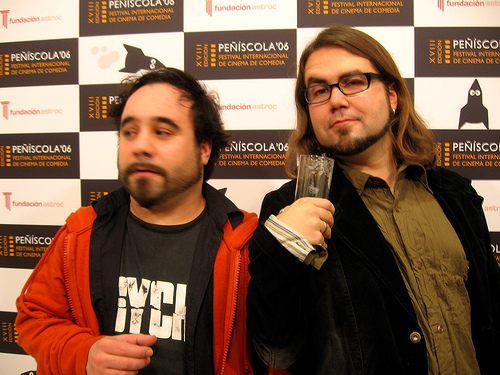
Koldo Serra (left) and Borja Crespo at the Peniscola comedy festival in 2006

Koldo Serra (born 15 April 1975) is a Spanish film director and screenwriter, born in Bilbao.

== Filmography ==
=== Director ===
- Amor de madre (1999 film)
- El Tren de la bruja (2003)
- The Backwoods (2006)
- Gominolas (2007) TV series (1 episode)
- El Comisario (2008) TV series (1 episode)
- Es bello vivir (2008) TV
- Muchachada nui (2009) TV series (1 episode)
- Guernica (2016)
- 70 Binladens (2019)
- Money Heist (2019) TV series (2 episodes)

=== Screenwriter ===
- Amor de madre (1999)
- El Tren de la bruja (2003)
- The Backwoods (2006)
- ASD. Alma sin dueño (2008)
- Muchachada nui (2009) TV series (1 episode)
