= Supervivientes: Perdidos en Honduras (2014) =

- Presented by: Jorge Javier Vázquez
- No. of days: 72
- No. of castaways: 22
- Winner: Abraham García
- Location: Cayos Cochinos, Honduras
- No. of episodes: 13

Release
- Original release: March 17 – May 27, 2014

Season chronology
- ← Previous; 2011 Next → 2015

Supervivientes 2014: Perdidos en Honduras is the ninth season of the show Supervivientes and the thirteenth season of Survivor to air in Spain. It was broadcast on Telecinco from March 17, 2014 to May 27, 2014.

For this year, the show returned to Honduras for the fifth time. Jorge Javier Vázquez acted as the main host at the central studio in Madrid, with Raquel Sánchez Silva co-hosting from the island, and Álvaro de la Lama hosting a side debate of the program.

== Season summary ==
With this season, the tribes were initially divided into two tribes, Cayo Paloma and Isla Bonita. Contestants from Isla Bonita were exempt from main nominations, which happened in Cayo Paloma. This season has the record of the Spanish franchise of most evacuations and exits for medical reasons or family issues, with four forced ejections and two voluntary exits. There was an important twist this season, which consisted of eliminated contestants from Cayo Paloma being not really eliminated from the competiton, moving to Isla Bonita. Every week, each moved Cayo Paloma contestant had to face elimination with the weekly recent eliminated, and the one who survived would still remain at Isla Bonita. Following the fifth elimination, the tribes merged into only one tribe, and at this point, the new eliminated would move to El Palafito, a twelve-square metre platform, where they would live alone every week. Rafa was the first one to go to El Palafito, living there for five weeks. When this twist was over, he won the last vote of El Palafito against Carolina, thus joining the last three contestants. Ultimately, it was Abraham García who won this season over Rafa Lomana, winning the €200,000 grand prize and a car.

== Finishing order ==
Contestant	Occupation/Famous For	Original tribe	Merged tribe	Finish
Oriana Marzoli; 22, Barcelona	MyHyV star	Isla Bonita		Quit; Day 5
Alberto Santana; 24, Gran Canaria	MyHyV star	Isla Bonita		Evacuated; Day 8
La Pelopony; 27, Barcelona	Singer	Isla Bonita		1st Voted Out; Day 8
Antonio Tejado; 26, Seville	Chayo Mohedano's ex-boyfriend	Cayo Paloma		Evacuated; Day 10
Anabel Pantoja; 27, Seville	Isabel Pantoja niece	Cayo Paloma		2nd Voted Out; Day 15
Pascual Fernández; 30, Cádiz	Un príncipe para Corina winner	Isla Bonita		3rd Voted Out; Day 15
Suhaila Jad; 25, Madrid	Tennis player, MyHyV star	Isla Bonita		Left Competition; Day 22
Aran Aznar; 39, Madrid	José María Aznar's niece	Cayo Paloma		4th Voted Out; Day 22
Bibiana Fernández; 60, Tangier	Actress and singer	Cayo Paloma		5th Voted Out; Day 29
Leo Margets; 31, Barcelona	Professional poker player	Cayo Paloma	Merged	6th Voted Out; Day 43
Diego Matamoros; 27, Madrid	Kiko Matamoros' son	Isla Bonita	Merged	Evacuated; Day 46
Tony Spina; 24, Milan	MyHyV star	Isla Bonita	Merged	Evacuated; Day 50
Viviana Figueredo; 26, Asunción	Model	Isla Bonita	Merged	7th Voted Out; Day 50
Kátia Aveiro; 36, Funchal	Singer, Cristiano Ronaldo's sister	Cayo Paloma	Merged	8th Voted Out; Day 57
Rebeca Pous; 35, Barcelona	Singer; Aventura en África contestant		Merged	9th Voted Out; Day 57
Amador Mohedano; 60, Chipiona	Rocío Jurado's brother		Merged	10th Voted Out; Day 64
Almudena "Chiqui" Martínez; 30, Cartagena	Gran Hermano 10 finalist	Isla Bonita	Merged	11th Voted Out; Day 65
Carolina Sobe; 41, Madrid	Gran Hermano 11 housemate	Cayo Paloma	Merged	12th Voted Out; Day 65
Nacho Montes; 43, Menorca	Television stylist and writer	Cayo Paloma	Merged	13th Voted Out; Day 71
Yong Li; 19, Irún	Un príncipe para Corina contestant	Cayo Paloma	Merged	Third Place; Day 71
Rafael Lomana; 49, Madrid	Adventurer	Cayo Paloma	Merged	Runner-Up; Day 72
Abraham García; 22, Campo Real	Gandía Shore star	Isla Bonita	Merged	Sole Survivor; Day 72

== Nominations ==
	Week 1	Week 2		Week 3		Week 4	Week 5	Week 6	Week 7	Week 8	Week 9		Week 10		Final		Total votes
Abraham	Rafa	Pascual	Anabel	Nominated	Rafa	Leo	Leo	Vivi	Nacho	Nacho	Immune	Nacho	Nacho	Nacho	Finalist	Sole Survivor (Day 72)	0
Rafa	Aran	Immune	Anabel	Immune	Bibiana	Kátia	Palafito						Nominated	Nacho	Nominated	Runner-Up (Day 72)	19
Yong	Leo	Immune	Anabel	Immune	Bibiana	Nacho	Almudena	Kátia	Carolina	Amador	Immune	Almudena	Almudena	Rafa	Nominated	Third Place (Day 71)	11
Nacho	Yong	Immune	Anabel	Immune	Rafa	Rafa	Yong	Amador	Carolina	Almudena	Nominated	Amador	Almudena	Rafa	Eliminated (Day 71)		6
Carolina	Not in the game			Exempt	Yong	Yong	Leo	Nacho	Tony	Palafito			Nominated	Eliminated (Day 65)			9
Almudena	Leo	Vivi	Anabel	Abraham	Rafa	Kátia	Carolina	Nacho	Tony	Amador	Nominated	Amador	Yong	Eliminated (Day 65)			7
Amador	Not in the game						Tony	Diego	Tony	Yong	Immune	Yong	Eliminated (Day 64)				8
Rebeca	Not in the game						Tony	Nacho	Yong	Nominated	Palafito	Eliminated (Day 57)					0
Kátia	Yong	Immune	Yong	Immune	Yong	Rafa	Carolina	Amador	Yong	Amador	Nominated	Eliminated (Day 57)					5
Vivi	Rafa	Nominated	Anabel	Nominated	Rafa	Leo	Carolina	Nacho	Palafito	Eliminated (Day 50)							0
Tony	Not in the game					Kátia	Almudena	Almudena	Carolina	Evacuated (Day 50)							5
Diego	Rafa	Pascual	Anabel	Abraham	Rafa	Kátia	Carolina	Amador	Carolina	Evacuated (Day 46)							1
Leo	Aran	Immune	Anabel	Immune	Bibiana	Yong	Carolina	Palafito	Eliminated (Day 43)								7
Bibiana	Aran	Immune	Leo	Immune	Rafa	Isla; Bonita	Eliminated (Day 29)										3
Aran	Leo	Isla; Bonita				Eliminated (Day 22)											5
Suhaila	Rafa	Pascual	Anabel	Abraham	Rafa	Left Competition (Day 22)											0
Pascual	Rafa	Nominated	Anabel	Nominated	Eliminated (Day 15)												0
Anabel	Aran	Immune	Yong	Eliminated (Day 15)													10
Antonio	Aran	Not eligible	Evacuated (Day 10)														0
Pelopony	Rafa	Nominated	Eliminated (Day 8)														0
Alberto	Rafa	Evacuated (Day 8)															0
Oriana	Rafa	Left Competition (Day 5)															0
Notes	See note 1	See note 2	See note 3	See note 4	See note 5	See note 6, 7	See note 8, 9	See note 10, 11	See note 12, 13	See note 14, 15, 16	See note 17, 18, 19	See note 20	See note 21, 22	See note 23	None		
Nominated by Tribe			Anabel		Bibiana; Rafa	Kátia; Rafa	Carolina; Tony	Amador; Nacho	Carolina; Tony	Amador; Yong		Amador	Almudena	Rafa			
Nominated by Leader			Yong		Yong	Yong	Leo	Vivi	Nacho	Nacho		Nacho	Nacho	Nacho			
Nominated	Aran; Rafa	Pelopony; Vivi	Anabel; Yong	Pascual; Vivi	Bibiana; Rafa; Yong	Kátia; Rafa; Yong	Carolina; Leo; Tony	Amador; Nacho; Vivi	Carolina; Nacho; ~~Tony~~	Amador; Nacho; Rebeca; Yong	Almudena; Kátia; Nacho	Amador; Nacho	Almudena; Nacho	Nacho; Rafa	Rafa; Yong	Abraham; Rafa	
Nominated	Aran; Rafa	Pelopony; Vivi	Anabel; Yong	Pascual; Vivi	Bibiana; Rafa; Yong	Kátia; Rafa; Yong	Carolina; Leo; Tony	Amador; Nacho; Vivi	Carolina; Nacho; ~~Tony~~	Amador; Nacho; Rebeca; Yong	Almudena; Kátia; Nacho	Amador; Nacho	Carolina; Rafa	Nacho; Rafa	Rafa; Yong	Abraham; Rafa	
Eliminated	Aran; 52% to move	Pelopony; Most votes to eliminate	Anabel; Most votes to move	Pascual; Most votes to eliminate	Bibiana; Most votes to move	Rafa; 54.3% to move	Leo; Most votes to exile	Vivi; 43.9% to exile	Carolina; 79.4% to exile (out of 2)	Rebeca; Most votes to exile	Kátia; 42.2% to exile	Amador; 66.4% to exile	Almudena; 58.3% to eliminate	Nacho; Most votes to eliminate	Yong; Most votes to eliminate	Rafa; 49.6% to win	
Eliminated	Aran; 52% to move	Pelopony; Most votes to eliminate	Anabel; Most votes to move	Pascual; Most votes to eliminate	Bibiana; Most votes to move	Rafa; 54.3% to move	Leo; Most votes to exile	Vivi; 43.9% to exile	Carolina; 79.4% to exile (out of 2)	Rebeca; Most votes to exile	Kátia; 42.2% to exile	Amador; 66.4% to exile	Carolina; 33% to be finalist	Nacho; Most votes to eliminate	Yong; Most votes to eliminate	Abraham; 50.4% to win	
Isla Bonita/Palafito Nominated			Anabel; Aran		Aran; Bibiana	Bibiana; Rafa		Leo; Rafa; Vivi	Carolina; Rafa; Vivi		Carolina; Katía; Rafa; Rebeca	Amador; Carolina; Rafa					
Isla Bonita/Palafito Eliminated			Anabel; 0 of 6 votes to save		Aran; Most votes to eliminate	Bibiana; Most votes to eliminate		Leo; 50.4% to eliminate	Vivi; 49.9% to eliminate		Kátia; 34.4% to eliminate	Amador; 47.2% to eliminate					
Isla Bonita/Palafito Eliminated			Anabel; 0 of 6 votes to save		Aran; Most votes to eliminate	Bibiana; Most votes to eliminate		Leo; 50.4% to eliminate	Vivi; 49.9% to eliminate		Rebeca; 26.9% to eliminate	Amador; 47.2% to eliminate					

- Contestant swapped tribes and was exempt from main nomination.
- Contestant was immune
- Contestant was leader and whoever they nominated would automatically face elimination (Immune)

=== Notes ===
- ^Note 1: On the launch the contestants from Cayo Paloma nominated and the contestants from Isla Bonita nominated on the Debate. Isla Bonita tribe nominated Cayo Paloma tribe.
- ^Note 2: Aran was evicted but she was sent to Isla Bonita and she had to nominate 3 contestants and she nominated Pascual, Pelopony and Viviana. Then the rest of contestants of Isla Bonita had to save one of the three nominees. They saved Pascual.
- ^Note 3: As the winner of the immunity challenge, Kátia was given the power to name a nominee.
- ^Note 4: Anabel was evicted but she was sent to Isla Bonita, then the contestants from that island had to evict a contestant between Aran and Anabel. Anabel was evicted with 0 votes. Aran had to nominate 3 contestants and she nominated Abraham, Pascual and Viviana. Then non nominees had to save one of the three nominees. They saved Abraham.
- ^Note 5: As the winner of the immunity challenge, Kátia was given the power to name a nominee. Carolina and Tony were expemt to be nominated as they were new contestants.
- ^Note 6: As the winner of the immunity challenge, Carolina was given the power to name a nominee.
- ^Note 7: Bibiana was evicted but she was sent to Isla Bonita where she faced a nomination with Aran. Finally Aran received most votes to evict.
- ^Note 8: As the winner of the immunity challenge, Abraham was given the power to name a nominee. Almudena and Tony were tied with 2 votes and Abraham had to break it, nominating Tony. Amador and Rebeca were expemt to be nominated as they were new contestants.
- ^Note 9: Rafa was evicted but he was sent to Isla Bonita where he faced a nomination with Bibiana. He survived the vote and he was sent to the Palafito.
- ^Note 10: Leo was evicted but she was sent to the Palafito to live next week with Rafa.
- ^Note 11: As the winner of the immunity challenge, Abraham was given the power to name a nominee.
- ^Note 12: Vivi was evicted but she was sent to the Palafito where she faced a nomination with Leo and Rafa. Leo was finally evicted and Rafa and Vivi would live next week at the Palafito.
- ^Note 13: As the winner of the immunity challenge, Abraham was given the power to name a nominee.
- ^Note 14: Carolina was evicted but she was sent to the Palafito where she faced a nomination with Rafa and Vivi. Vivi was finally evicted and Carolina and Rafa would live next week at the Palafito.
- ^Note 15: As the winner of the immunity challenge, Abraham was given the power to name a nominee. Almudena and Yong were tied with 1 vote and Abraham had to break it, nominating Yong.
- ^Note 16: Rebeca was automatically nominated and banned from nominating because she revealed information from outside.
- ^Note 17: Rebeca was evicted but she was sent to the Palafito with Rafa and Carolina.
- ^Note 18: As they lost the immunity challenge, Almudena, Kátia and Nacho were automatically nominated for elimination.
- ^Note 19: Kátia was evicted but she was sent to the Palafito where she faced a nomination with Carolina, Rafa and Rebeca. Rebeca and Kátia were finally evicted and Carolina and Rafa would live next week at the Palafito.
- ^Note 20: As the winner of the immunity challenge, Abraham was given the power to name a nominee.
- ^Note 21: Amador was evicted but he was sent to the Palafito where he faced a nomination with Carolina and Rafa. Amador was finally evicted and Carolina and Rafa were the last inhabitants at the Palafito. So as they were the last inhabitantas of the Palafito they faced elimination.
- ^Note 22: As the winner of the immunity challenge, Abraham was given the power to name a nominee.
- ^Note 23: As the winner of the immunity challenge, Abraham was given the power to name a nominee.
