= Supervivientes: Perdidos en Honduras (2015) =

- Presented by: Jorge Javier Vázquez
- No. of days: 88
- No. of castaways: 17
- Winner: Christopher Mateo
- Runner-up: Nacho Vidal
- Location: Cayos Cochinos, Honduras
- No. of episodes: 14

Release
- Original network: Telecinco
- Original release: April 16 – July 16, 2015

Season chronology
- ← Previous; 2014 Next → 2016

Supervivientes 2015: Perdidos en Honduras is the tenth season of the show Supervivientes and the fourteenth season of Survivor to air in Spain. It was broadcast on Telecinco from 16 April 2015 to 16 June 2015.

For this year, the show stayed in Honduras for the sixth time. Once again, Jorge Javier Vázquez was the main host at the central studio in Madrid, with Lara Álvarez co-hosting from the island, and Raquel Sánchez Silva hosting a side debate of the program.

== Finishing order ==
Contestant	Occupation/Famous For	Original tribe	Merged tribe	Finish
Rasel Abad; 33, Seville	Singer	Veterans		Quit; Day 0
Carmen Gahona; 59, Seville	Television personality	Veterans		Evacuated; Day 8
Arantxa Bustos; 23, Madrid	Gandía Shore star	Rookies		1st Voted Out; Day 22
José Labrador; 27, Sagunt	Gandía Shore star	Rookies		2nd Voted Out; Day 22
Isabel Rábago; 40, Ferrol	Journalist	Veterans		3rd Voted Out; Day 29
Noel Bayarri; 27, Lanzarote	MyHyV star	Rookies	Exile	4th Voted Out; Day 36
Carmen Lomana; 65, León	Socialite and businesswoman	Veterans	Merged	5th Voted Out; Day 43
Elisa De Panicis; 22, Italy	Model	Rookies	Exile	6th Voted Out; Day 50
Suhaila Jad; 26, Madrid	Tennis player, MyHyV star Supervivientes 2014 contestant	Veterans	Merged	7th Voted Out; Day 55
Lucía Parreño; 24, Madrid	Gran Hermano 15 housemate	Rookies	Merged	8th Voted Out; Day 64
Lola Ortiz; 25, Fuerteventura	MyHyV star	Rookies	Merged	9th Voted Out; Day 71
Fortu; 61, Madrid	Obús frontman	Veterans	Merged	10th Voted Out; Day 78
Isa Pantoja; 19, Seville	Isabel Pantoja's daughter	Veterans	Merged	11th Voted Out; Day 85
Rafi Camino; 45, Madrid	Former bullfighter	Veterans	Merged	12th Voted Out; Day 88
Rubén López; 22, Jaén	Mister Global Universe 2014	Rookies	Merged	Third Place; Day 88
Nacho Vidal; 41, Barcelona	Porn star	Veterans	Merged	Runner-Up; Day 88
Christopher Mateo; 18, Marbella	QQCCMH? star	Rookies	Merged	Sole Survivor; Day 88

== Nominations ==
	Week 1	Week 2	Week 3	Week 4	Week 5	Week 6	Week 7		Week 8	Week 9	Week 10	Week 11	Week 12	Week 13	Final		Total votes
Christopher	Elisa	Arantxa	Noel	Lucía	Lomana	~~Lucía~~	Lucía	Isa	Suhaila	Nacho	Isa	Fortu; Nacho	Nacho	Rafi	Finalist	Sole Survivor (Day 88)	-1
Nacho	Lomana	Suhaila	Fortu	Isa	Suhaila	~~Lucía~~	Lucía	Lola	Fortu	Isa	Exile; Island	Isa; Rafi	Rafi	Rubén	Nominated	Runner-Up (Day 88)	16
Rubén	Labrador	Lucía	Lola	Lucia	Isa	~~Lucía~~	Lucía	Lola	Nacho	Isa	Isa	Fortu; Nacho	Isa	Rafi	Nominated	Third Place (Day 88)	4
Rafi	Lomana	Suhaila	Nacho	Isa	Nacho	~~Isa~~	Lucía	Isa	Suhaila	Nacho	Fortu	Fortu; Nacho	Nacho	Rubén	Eliminated (Day 88)		7
Isa	Fortu	Nacho	Suhaila	Nacho	Nacho	~~Nacho~~	Fortu	Fortu	Fortu	Rafi	Fortu	Fortu; Nacho	Nacho	Eliminated (Day 85)			9
Fortu	Suhaila	Suhaila	Rábago	Suhaila	Suhaila	~~Lucía~~	Lucía	Lola	Suhaila	Nacho	Isa	Isa; Rafi	Eliminated (Day 78)				16
Lola	Labrador	Arantxa	Noel	Noel	Lomana	~~Nacho~~	Fortu	Fortu	Exile; Island			Eliminated (Day 71)					4
Lucía	Elisa	Rubén	Labrador	Noel	Lomana	~~Nacho~~	Fortu	Exile; Island			Eliminated (Day 64)						9
Suhaila	Fortu	Fortu	Lomana	Nacho	Nacho	~~Fortu~~	Nacho	Nacho	Fortu	Eliminated (Day 55)							10
Elisa	Labrador	Exile; Island							Eliminated (Day 50)								3
Lomana	Fortu	Rábago	Suhaila	Rafi	Nacho	Exile; Island		Eliminated (Day 43)									5
Noel	Lucía	Arantxa	Christopher	Lucía	Exile; Island	Eliminated (Day 36)											0
Rábago	Lomana	Suhaila	Fortu	Exile; Island	Eliminated (Day 29)												1
Labrador	Elisa	Rubén	Lucía	Eliminated (Day 22)													2
Arantxa	Lola	Rubén	Exile; Island	Eliminated (Day 22)													2
Gahona	Not eligible	Guest (Day 1–8)	Evacuated (Day 8)														0
Rasel	Left Competition (Day 0)																0
Notes	See note 1, 2, 3	See note 2, 4, 5	See note 6, 7, 8, 9	See note 2, 10, 11, 12	See note 13, 14, 15	See note 16, 17	See note 18, 19, 20	See note 21, 22, 23	See note 24, 25, 26	See note 27, 28, 29	See note 30, 31, 32	See note 33, 34	See note 35	See note 36	None		
Nominated by Tribe		Rubén; Suhaila		Isa; Lucía	Lomana; Nacho	~~Lucía~~; ~~Nacho~~	Lucía; Fortu	Lola	Suhaila	Nacho	Fortu		Nacho	Rafi			
Nominated by Leader		Arantxa; Nacho		Noel; Suhaila	Isa	~~Fortu~~	Nacho	Nacho	Nacho	Isa	Isa		Isa	Rubén			
Nominated	Elisa; Fortu; Labrador; Lomana	Arantxa; Nacho; Rubén; Suhaila	Christopher; Labrador; Lucía	Isa; Lucía; Noel; Suhaila	Isa; Lomana; Nacho	~~Fortu~~; ~~Lucía~~; ~~Nacho~~	Fortu; Lucía; Nacho	Lola; Nacho	Nacho; Suhaila	Isa; Nacho	Fortu; Isa	Fortu; Nacho	Isa; Nacho	Rafi; Rubén	Nacho; Rubén	Christopher; Nacho	
Nominated	Elisa; Fortu; Labrador; Lomana	Arantxa; Nacho; Rubén; Suhaila	Isa; Lomana; Rábago	Isa; Lucía; Noel; Suhaila	Isa; Lomana; Nacho	~~Fortu~~; ~~Lucía~~; ~~Nacho~~	Fortu; Lucía; Nacho	Lola; Nacho	Nacho; Suhaila	Isa; Nacho	Fortu; Isa	Fortu; Nacho	Isa; Nacho	Rafi; Rubén	Nacho; Rubén	Christopher; Nacho	
Eliminated	Elisa; Fewest votes to save	Arantxa; Fewest votes to save	Labrador; Fewest votes to save	Noel; Fewest votes to save	Lomana; Fewest votes to save		Lucía; Fewest votes to save	Lola; Fewest votes to save	Suhaila; 48.4% to save	Nacho; 48% to save	Fortu; Fewest votes to save	Fortu; Fewest votes to save	Isa; 49% to save	Rafi; Fewest votes to save	Rubén; Fewest votes to save	Nacho; 49.8% to win	
Eliminated	Elisa; Fewest votes to save	Arantxa; Fewest votes to save	Rábago; Fewest votes to save	Noel; Fewest votes to save	Lomana; Fewest votes to save		Lucía; Fewest votes to save	Lola; Fewest votes to save	Suhaila; 48.4% to save	Nacho; 48% to save	Fortu; Fewest votes to save	Fortu; Fewest votes to save	Isa; 49% to save	Rafi; Fewest votes to save	Rubén; Fewest votes to save	Christopher; 50.2% to win	
Exile Island Nominated			Arantxa; Elisa; Labrador; Rábago	Elisa; Noel; Rábago	Elisa; Lomana; Noel		Elisa; Lomana; Lucía	Elisa; Lola; Lucía	Lola; Lucía; Suhaila	Lola; Lucía; Nacho	Fortu; Lola; Nacho						
Exile Island Eliminated			Arantxa; Most votes to eliminate	Rábago; Most votes to eliminate	Noel; Most votes to eliminate		Lomana; Most votes to eliminate	Elisa; Most votes to eliminate	Suhaila; Most votes to eliminate	Lucía; Most votes to eliminate	Lola; Most votes to eliminate						
Exile Island Eliminated			Labrador; Most votes to eliminate	Rábago; Most votes to eliminate	Noel; Most votes to eliminate		Lomana; Most votes to eliminate	Elisa; Most votes to eliminate	Suhaila; Most votes to eliminate	Lucía; Most votes to eliminate	Lola; Most votes to eliminate						

- Contestant was fake evicted and sent to exile island.
- Contestant was immune
- Contestant was leader and whoever they nominated would automatically face elimination (Immune)
- Contestant was nominated

=== Notes ===
- ^Note 1: Rafi was exempt to be nominated as he was a new contestant.
- ^Note 2: Contestants were split in two tribes, Rookies and Veterans. From each tribe were nominated two contestants.
- ^Note 3: Elisa was fake evicted and sent to exile island.
- ^Note 4: As the winners of the immunity challenge, Isa P. and Noel were given the power to name a nominee.
- ^Note 5: Arantxa was fake evicted and sent to exile island.
- ^Note 6: This round, the contestants nominated in positive.
- ^Note 7: As the winners of the immunity challenge, Rafi and Rubén were given the power to save a contestant.
- ^Note 8: Labrador and Isabel Rábago were fake evicted and sent to exile island.
- ^Note 9: Arantxa and Labrador were officiality evicted by a vote to eliminate.
- ^Note 10: As the winners of the immunity challenge, Fortu and Lola were given the power to name a nominee. Isa and Nacho were tied with 2 votes and Fortu had to break it, nominating Isa.
- ^Note 11: Noel was fake evicted and sent to exile island.
- ^Note 12: Isabel Rábago was officiality evicted by a vote to eliminate.
- ^Note 13: As the winner of the immunity challenge, Rubén was given the power to name a nominee.
- ^Note 14: Carmen Lomana was fake evicted and sent to exile islands.
- ^Note 15: Noel was officiality evicted by a vote to eliminate.
- ^Note 16: As the winner of the immunity challenge, Suhaila was given the power to name a nominee.
- ^Note 17: Nominations and eviction were cancelled by error in leader challenge.
- ^Note 18: After the cancellation of the nominations and eviction, the leader challenge was made again. As the winner of the immunity challenge, Suhaila was given the power to name a nominee.
- ^Note 19: Lucía was fake evicted and sent to exile island.
- ^Note 20: Carmen Lomana was officiality evicted by a vote to eliminate.
- ^Note 21: As the winner of the immunity challenge, Suhaila was given the power to name a nominee.
- ^Note 22: Lola was fake evicted and sent to exile island.
- ^Note 23: Elisa was officiality evicted by a vote to eliminate.
- ^Note 24: As the winner of the immunity challenge, Rubén was given the power to name a nominee. Fortu and Suhaila were tied with 3 votes and Rubén had to broke it nominating Suhaila.
- ^Note 25: Suhaila was fake evicted and sent to exile island.
- ^Note 26: Suhaila was officiality evicted by a vote to eliminate.
- ^Note 27: As the winner of the immunity challenge, Rubén was given the power to name a nominee.
- ^Note 28: Nacho was fake evicted and sent to exile island.
- ^Note 29: Lucía was officiality evicted by a vote to eliminate.
- ^Note 30: As the winner of the immunity challenge, Christopher was given the power to name a nominee. Fortu and Isa were tied with 2 votes and Christopher had to broke it nominating Fortu.
- ^Note 31: Fortu was fake evicted and sent to exile island.
- ^Note 32: Lola was officiality evicted by a vote to eliminate.
- ^Note 33: Fortu and Nacho came back to the game as part of the end of exile island twist.
- ^Note 34: The immunity challenge could not be played because of the bad weather and for this reason, each contestant had no give two names for elimination.
- ^Note 35: As the winner of the immunity challenge, Rubén was given the power to name a nominee.
- ^Note 36: As the winner of the immunity challenge, Nacho was given the power to name a nominee.
