= Sofía Suescun =

Spanish television personality

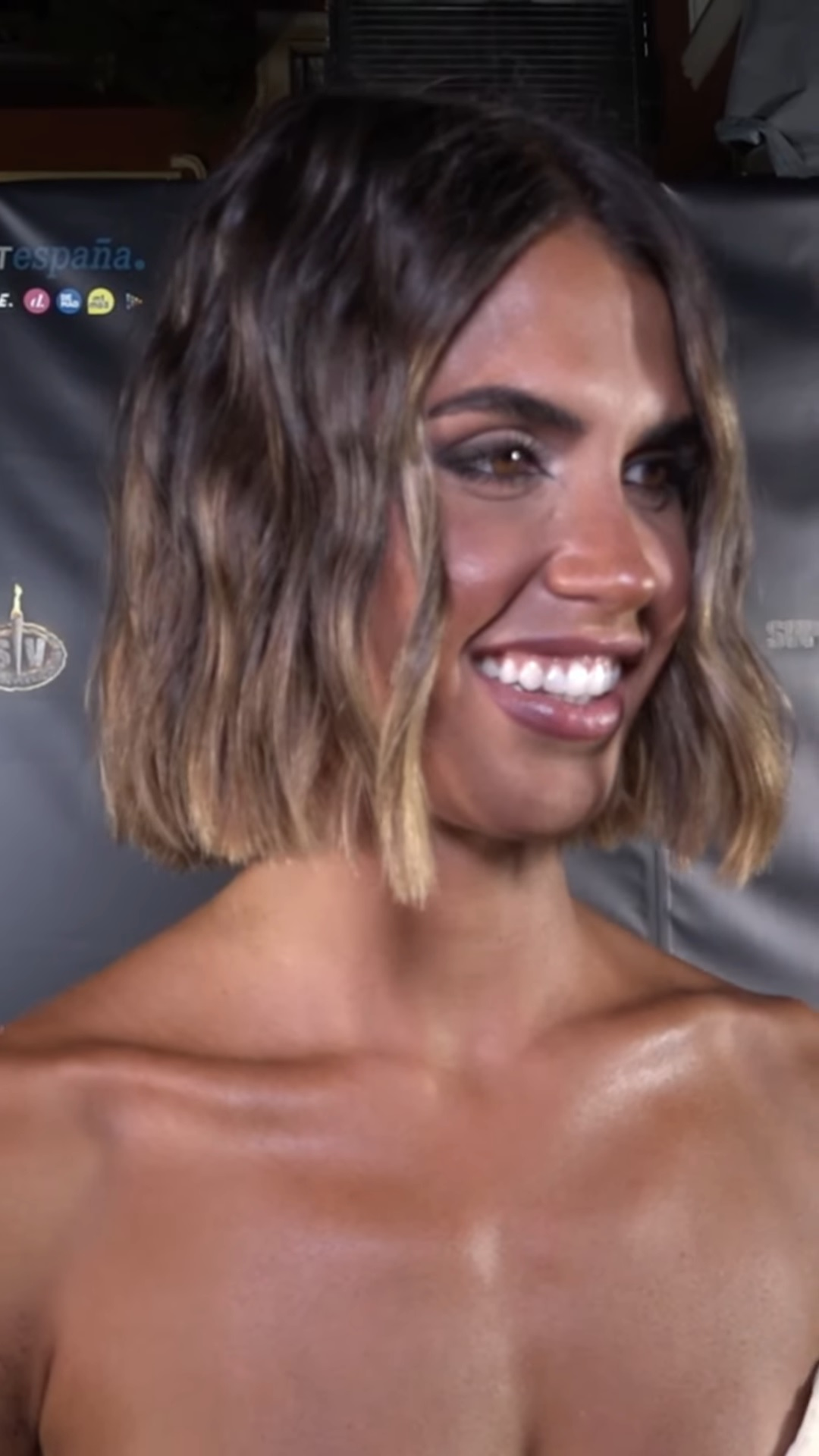
- Sofía Suescun in 2024
- Born: Sofía Suescun Galdeano; 4 June 1996 (age 29); Pamplona, Spain
- Occupations: Television personality, model, influencer

Sofía Suescun Galdeano (born July 4, 1996) is a Spanish television personality, model, and influencer who became known after competing in Gran Hermano 16, where she was the winner. Since then, she has participated as a collaborator and presenter on several television programs.

== Biography ==
Sofia Suescun Galdeano was born in Pamplona (Navarra) on July 4, 1996. Before taking part in the sixteenth season of Gran Hermano in Spain. In the contest, she won the affection of the public and ended up being the winner of the edition.

She is a cousin of footballer Nico Serrano.

== Professional career ==
=== Leap into fame ===
With the title of champion of the reality TV contest under her belt, she began to receive offers from the main Mediaset España, network, participating as a tronista and later as a love advisor on Mujeres y hombres y viceversa. In addition, she also occasionally appeared in programs such as Sálvame or Sábado Deluxe. After becoming a tabloid personality, she was selected to participate in Supervivientes 2018. In this new reality and survival contest, she won again the votes of the public, becoming the winner of the edition.

=== Television anchoring ===
After winning again, Suescun tried her luck in music with Radial, a Spanish music production company, launching the single Muévelo with a video clip. The song soon became number 1 in YouTube trends and has exceeded 2 million views, although the reviews from experts and the general public, in general, were bad. In addition, in a strategy by Mediaset España to take advantage of the pull of the Navarre native among the youngest targets to move her television influence to the digital environment, she premiered on Mtmad a docu-reality called Los mundos de Sofía. In 2018, she also became a collaborator in Gran Hermano VIP 6 and Viva la vida.

In January 2019, she entered her third reality TV contest, Gran Hermano Dúo, where, after being expelled and repechaged, she was eliminated just before the final. After her time in the contest, she continued collaborating as a love advisor in Mujeres y hombres y viceversa and in Gran Hermano VIP 7, defending her partner, Kiko Jiménez. In addition, that year she participated in two reality TV contests on Mtmad, along with other faces of Mediaset España: Crazy party and Mad Merry Christmas. EIn September 2020, she made her debut as a collaborator of Ya es mediodía in Telecinco. That same year, she signed on as one of the protagonists of the reality show Solos/Solas on Mitele Plus, Mediaset España's content platform. In 2021, she participates in Ven a cenar conmigo: Gourmet edition, along with Terelu Campos, Yurena and Gianmarco Onestini.

After training at Olga Marset's School of Communication in a course for presenters, she had the opportunity to present Una aventura extrema on Mitele Plus, where she reviewed from Monday to Friday the survival of the contestants, focusing on their fishing work, their ability to get food or water, or their skills to build a place to shelter from the storms of the island. Already in 2019, she had the opportunity to present Quiz SV on Mitele's app. In addition to her television projects, she is also considered an influencer. She has more than one million followers on Instagram and more than 100 thousand on Twitter, in addition to advertising several brands on television and social networks.

== Television ==
Year	Title	Channel	Role
2015	Gran Hermano 16	Telecinco	Contestant - Winner
2016	Mujeres y hombres y viceversa	Telecinco	Tronista
2017–2020	Mujeres y hombres y viceversa	Telecinco / Cuatro	Love advisor
2018	Supervivientes	Telecinco	Contestant - Winner
2018	Viva la vida	Telecinco	Collaborator
2018–2019	Los mundos de Sofía	Mtmad	Protagonist
2018–2020	Sábado Deluxe	Telecinco	Collaborator
2018–2019	Gran Hermano VIP: El Debate	Telecinco	Collaborator
2019	Gran Hermano Dúo	Telecinco	Contestant - 4th / 11th expelled
2019	Quiz SV	Mitele	Host
2019	Crazy party	Mtmad	Participant
2019–2021	Supervivientes: Conexión Honduras	Telecinco	Collaborator
2019–2020	Mad Merry Christmas	Mtmad	Participant
2020	El debate de las tentaciones	Cuatro	Collaborator
2020	El tiempo del descuento	Telecinco	Collaborator
2020	La casa fuerte	Telecinco	Collaborator
2020	Solos/Solas	Mitele Plus	Participant
2020–2021	Ya es mediodía	Telecinco	Collaborator
2021	Una aventura extrema	Mitele Plus	Participant
2021	Ven a cenar conmigo: Gourmet edition	Telecinco	Participant - 3rd classified

== Discography ==
=== Singles ===
Title	Year	Lists	Album
Title	Year	SPA	Album
"Muévelo"	2018	―	
