= BB15 =

BB15 may refer to:

- Big Brother 15 (disambiguation), a television program in various versions
- USS Georgia (BB-15), a United States Navy battleship
