= Romina Malaspina =

Argentine model and journalist

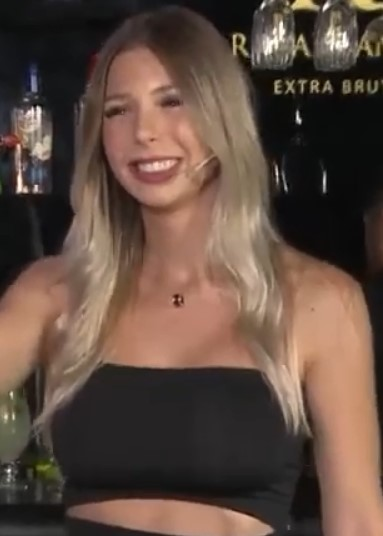
- Malaspina in 2020
- Born: 7 July 1994 (age 32); Mar del Plata, Argentina
- Height: 1.72 m (5 ft 8 in)

Romina Malaspina (born 7 July 1994 in Mar del Plata, Argentina) is an Argentine model, television personality, reality star, showgirl, dancer, singer, social media influencer, television host, businesswoman, disc-jockey and actress.

== Biography ==
=== Career ===
She began her television career in 2015 as a contestant on the Argentine reality show Gran Hermano and appeared in other reality shows such as the Chilean Doble Tentación (2017) and the Spanish Supervivientes (2018). She appeared on the cover of Playboy Argentina in November 2015. In 2016, she participated as a guest and commentator in the Argentine television shows Morfi, todos a la mesa and La jaula de la moda. She appeared as a reggaeton dancer, in the Argentine music video "Más que amigos" by J One released in July 2016. In 2018, she performed as a vedette and actress, in Magnífica, an Argentine theater production. After her participation in Telecinco's Supervivientes, she was invited as a guest and commentator in Volverte a ver, a Spanish television show. Over the years, she has also worked as model and social media influencer.

Under the pseudonym Ru$$ha, she released the music video for her debut single "Hustler Lady" in March 2020, serving as main singer, dancer and showgirl. In April–May 2020, she was announced as a celebrity dancer contestant on the Argentine talent show Bailando por un Sueño hosted by Marcelo Tinelli, but the show was cancelled before airing due to the COVID-19 pandemic. Since June 2020, she has co-hosted two news programs, Noticias de 22 a 00 and Fin de semana on the Argentine news cable channel Canal 26. In July 2020, due to her commitments as a social media influencer and presenter on the news programs, she declined to participate in Cantando 2020, a singing competition that replaced Bailando 2020, despite her initial availability.

She starred in the Argentine music video "Mujer" by Ecko released in September 2020. The Argentine media reported in April 2021 that she had been nominated for the Latin Plug Award in the category of periodista del ano (Journalist of the Year). Her music video for her second single "Color" was produced in Colombia and released on 30 April 2021, in collaboration with Deer Models. She was credited as the main singer, dancer, showgirl and music composer. The single achieved commercial success in Argentina and Chile. In May 2021, she appeared as a celebrity guest in the game show Pasapalabra, Especial Famosos, the Argentine version of The Alphabet Game. In the same period, she left Canal 26 to focus on her career as a professional singer.

She won the Latin Plug Award in May 2021 as Mejor Periodista Latin Plug del año (Best Latin Plug Journalist of the Year). She appeared as the principal actress in the Argentine music video, "De Ahí" by Big Apple and Fer Palacio, released on 8 July 2021. In August 2021, she released her third single, "Todo está bien" also in collaboration with Deer Models, and was credited as the main singer, dancer, showgirl and music composer. In October 2021, Argentine media reported that she had begun a new career as a DJ.

=== Television ===
Reality shows
Year	Title	Place	Notes
2015	(Argentina) Gran Hermano 2015	9th	10th evicted (day 113)
2017	(Chile) Doble tentación	18th	Expelled (day 68)
2018	(Spain) Supervivientes: Perdidos en Honduras (2018)	9th	6th voted out (day 64)
2023	(Argentina) Bailando 2023	30th	4th eliminated (day 31)
2025	(Spain) Gran Hermano Dúo 3	5th	11th Evicted (day 57)

Programs
Year	Title	Role	Notes
2020 – 2021	Noticias de 22 a 00	Host	
2020 – 2021	Fin de semana	Host	

=== Theater ===
- 2018 - Magnífica as Vedette

=== Video clips ===
Year	Title	Role	Artist
2016	"Más que amigos"	Principal actress	J One
2020	"Hustler Lady"	Main singer	Herself as Ru$$ha
2020	"Mujer"	Principal actress	Ecko
2021	"Color"	Main singer	Herself with Deer Models
2021	"De Ahí"	Principal actress	Big Apple and Fer Palacio
2021	"Todo está bien"	Main singer	Herself with Deer Models

== List of awards and nominations ==
Year	Awards	Category	Nominated work	Result
2021	Latin Plug Awards 2021	Best Journalist of the Year	Fin de semana / Noticias de 20 a 22	Won
