= Gran Hermano VIP season 3 =

Gran Hermano VIP
- Season 3
- Presented by: Jordi González
- No. of days: 75
- No. of housemates: 15
- Winner: Belén Esteban
- Runner-up: Aguasantas Vilches
- No. of episodes: 13

Release
- Original network: Telecinco
- Original release: January 11 – March 26, 2015

Season chronology
- ← Previous; Season 2 Next → Season 4

Gran Hermano VIP 3 was the third season of the Gran Hermano VIP series of the Spanish Gran Hermano (Big Brother) reality TV franchise. The series was launched in January 2015 on Telecinco, 10 years after the previous season was aired. Jordi González returned to host the series, as the last time he hosted a GH series was with El Reencuentro 2. During the grand finale of Gran Hermano 15, it was officially confirmed that GHVIP would start in January. It was also announced that José and Juan, who are brothers from the musical group Los Chunguitos, were the first housemates of the season.

== Housemates ==
Housemates	Age	Residence	Famous for...	Entered	Exited	Status
Belén Esteban	41	Paracuellos	TV panelist	Day 1	Day 75	Winner
Aguasantas Vilches	22	Jerez	TV personality	Day 1	Day 75	Runner-up
Coman Mitogo	30	Irun	Adán y Eva contestant	Day 1	Day 75	3rd Place
Fede Rebecchi	25	Madrid	MyHyV participant	Day 1	Day 74	10th Evicted
Ángela Portero	49	Madrid	Journalist and writer	Day 26	Day 68	9th Evicted
Chari Lojo	31	Cádiz	Gran Hermano 12 housemate	Day 26	Day 61	8th Evicted
Ylenia Padilla	26	Benidorm	Gandía Shore star	Day 1	Day 54	7th Evicted
Ares Teixidó	27	Lleida	Reporter and TV host	Day 1	Day 47	6th Evicted
Israel Lancho	35	Badajoz	Bullfighter	Day 1	Day 40	5th Evicted
Víctor Sandoval	47	Sitges	TV host	Day 1	Day 33	4th Evicted
Laura Cuevas	26	Jerez	Isabel Pantoja’s former employee	Day 1	Day 26	3rd Evicted
Kiko Rivera	30	Seville	DJ and singer	Day 5	Day 21	Walked
Sandro Rey	47	Madrid	Fortune teller and TV host	Day 1	Day 19	2nd Evicted
Olvido Hormigos	43	Los Yébenes	City councillor	Day 1	Day 12	1st Evicted
José Salazar	57	Badajoz	Los Chunguitos members	Day 1	Day 5	Ejected
Juan Salazar	60	Badajoz	Los Chunguitos members	Day 1	Day 5	Ejected

== Nominations table ==
	Week 1	Week 2	Week 3	Week 4		Week 5	Week 6	Week 7	Week 8	Week 9	Week 10 Final		
	Week 1	Week 2	Week 3	Day 26	Day 29	Week 5	Week 6	Week 7	Week 8	Week 9	Day 74	Day 75	
Belén	Olvido; Laura	Kiko; Coman	Kiko; Fede	~~Aguasantas~~; ~~Ares~~; ~~Coman~~	Banned	Aguasantas; Ares	(5) Ares (1) Ángela	Chari; Ángela	Chari; Ángela; Ángela	Ángela; Aguasantas	No; Nominations	Winner (Day 75)	
Aguasantas	Laura; Coman	Kiko; Fede	Kiko; Fede	~~Belén~~; ~~Fede~~	Víctor; Israel	Belén; Israel	(2) Fede (1) Belén	Fede; Belén	Belén; Fede; Belén	Belén; Fede	No; Nominations	Runner-up (Day 75)	
Coman	Ares; Laura	Sandro; Víctor	Víctor; Laura	~~Víctor~~; ~~Ares~~; ~~Ylenia~~	Víctor; Ylenia	Belén; Ylenia	(5) Ylenia (2) Belén	Fede; Ylenia	Fede; Belén	Fede; Ángela	No; Nominations	Third Place (Day 75)	
Fede	Laura; Olvido	Víctor; Aguasantas	Laura; Víctor	~~Ares~~; ~~Aguasantas~~	Ares; Aguasantas	Aguasantas; Ares	(2) Ares (2) Ángela	Ángela; Chari	Aguasantas; Chari	Coman; Aguasantas	No; Nominations	Evicted (Day 74)	
Ángela	Not in House			Exempt		Israel; Ylenia	(5) Ylenia (2) Fede	Ylenia; Belén	Belén; Fede; Chari	Aguasantas; Fede	Evicted (Day 68)		
Chari	Not in House			Exempt		Israel; Ylenia	(4) Belén (3) Ylenia	Fede; Ylenia	Fede; Belén; Belén	Evicted (Day 61)			
Ylenia	Coman; Israel	Kiko; Coman	Kiko; Ares	~~Ares~~; ~~Coman~~; ~~Aguasantas~~	Ares; Coman	Chari; Ares	(5) Ares (3) Ángela	Ángela; Chari	Evicted (Day 54)				
Ares	Israel; Olvido	Coman; Laura	Ylenia; Fede	~~Ylenia~~; ~~Víctor~~	Ylenia; Víctor	Ylenia; Israel	(5) Fede (4) Belén	Evicted (Day 47)					
Israel	Laura; Olvido	Laura; Coman	Fede; Ares	~~Ares~~; ~~Coman~~; ~~Aguasantas~~	Ares; Aguasantas	Ares; Chari	Evicted (Day 40)						
Víctor	Coman; Israel	Coman; Kiko	Fede; Kiko	~~Ares~~; ~~Aguasantas~~	Ares; Aguasantas	Evicted (Day 33)							
Laura	Israel; Olvido	Kiko; Sandro	Fede; Kiko	Evicted (Day 26)									
Kiko	Exempt	Laura; Belén	Laura; Belén	Walked (Day 21)									
Sandro	Coman; Israel	Coman; Laura	Evicted (Day 19)										
Olvido	Belén; Ares	Evicted (Day 12)											
Chunguitos	Ejected (Day 5)												
Nomination Notes	1, 2	3, 4	3	5, 6, 7	3, 6, 8	3	9	3	3, 10	3	11	none	
Nominated for eviction	Israel; Laura; Olvido	Coman; Laura; Sandro; Víctor	Fede; ~~Kiko~~; Laura	~~Aguasantas~~; ~~Ares~~; ~~Coman~~	Aguasantas; Ares; Víctor; Ylenia	Ares; Israel; Ylenia	Ares; Belén; Ylenia	Ángela; Fede; Ylenia	Belén; Chari; Fede	Aguasantas; Ángela; Fede	Aguasantas; Belén; Coman; Fede	Aguasantas; Belén; Coman	
Walked	none		Kiko	none									
Ejected	Chunguitos	none											
Evicted	Olvido; 53.7% to evict	Sandro; 36.9% to evict	Laura; 72.4% to evict	Nomination cancelled	Víctor; 67.2% to evict	Israel; 52.2% to evict	Ares; 50.9% to evict	Ylenia; 55.8% to evict	Chari; 63.5% to evict	Ángela; 50.1% to evict	Fede; 3.2% to save	Coman; 10.6% to win (out of 3)	Aguasantas; 32.1% to win (out of 2)
Evicted	Olvido; 53.7% to evict	Sandro; 36.9% to evict	Laura; 72.4% to evict	Nomination cancelled	Víctor; 67.2% to evict	Israel; 52.2% to evict	Ares; 50.9% to evict	Ylenia; 55.8% to evict	Chari; 63.5% to evict	Ángela; 50.1% to evict	Fede; 3.2% to save	Belén; 67.9% to win (out of 2)	

=== Notes ===
- ^Note 1 : The housemates nominated a member of each group with 1 point.
- ^Note 2 : Kiko was exempt from nominations as he was a new housemate.
- ^Note 3 : From this round the housemates nominated with 2 and 1 point.
- ^Note 4 : Aguasantas, Fede, Israel and Sandro won the right of saving a nominee, they saved Kiko. Because of that, Sandro and Víctor were added to the nomination list.
- ^Note 5 : This round of nominations had a twist. There were two telephones, a green one and a red one. If a housemate chooses the green one, they would nominate with 2 and 1 point. If a housemate chooses the red one, they would nominate with 3, 2 and 1 point.
- ^Note 6 : Ángela and Chari were exempt from nominations as they were a new housemates.
- ^Note 7 : Nominations and eviction were cancelled as there was proof that some housemates cheated on nominations.
- ^Note 8 : A new round of nominations took place on Sunday and Belén was banned from nominating as she was the one who cheated on the previous nominations.
- ^Note 9 : This round of nominations had a twist. Nominations were done with two dice rolls. Each housemate had to nominate with the points shown from the dice rolls.
- ^Note 10 : For this round, the public voted the girls as the winners of the weekly task. The reward was to choose an evicted housemate who would nominate for her with an extra point. Aguasantas and Chari chose Ares, Ángela chose Sandro and Belén chose Ylenia.
- ^Note 11 : There were no nominations this week and instead, the public were allowed to vote for their winner. The housemate with the fewest votes would be evicted the day before the final in a surprise eviction.

== Nominations total received ==
	Week 1	Week 2	Week 3	Week 4		Week 5	Week 6	Week 7	Week 8	Week 9	Final		Total
Belén	1	1	1	~~2~~	0	4	11	2	8	2	-	Winner	30
Aguasantas	0	1	0	~~7~~	3	4	0	0	2	4	-	Runner-up	14
Coman	4	9	0	~~5~~	1	0	0	0	0	2	-	3rd Place	16
Fede	0	1	9	~~1~~	0	0	9	5	6	4	-	Evicted	34
Ángela	Not in House			-		0	6	5	2	3	Evicted		16
Chari	Not in House			-		3	0	3	4	Evicted			10
Ylenia	0	0	2	~~3~~	3	5	13	5	Evicted				28
Ares	2	0	2	~~14~~	8	5	12	Evicted					29
Israel	5	0	0	~~0~~	1	6	Evicted						12
Víctor	0	3	3	~~4~~	5	Evicted							11
Laura	5	6	5	Evicted									16
Kiko	-	9	8	Walked									17
Sandro	0	3	Evicted										3
Olvido	5	Evicted											5
Chunguitos	Ejected												0

== Debate: Blind results ==
Week	1stPlace to Evict	2ndPlace to Evict	3rdPlace to Evict	4thPlace to Evict	5thPlace to Evict	Person with Fewest Votes
1	65.9%	20.6%	13.5%			Not Shown
2	43.4%	26.1%	19.2%	11.3%		Víctor
2	44.1%	23.1%	22.6%	10.2%		Víctor
3	74.7%	25.3%				Not Shown
4	No Public Voting					
5	39.5%	36.0%	24.5%			Not Shown
5	40.2%	35.9%	23.9%			Not Shown
5	40.8%	40.5%	18.7%			Not Shown
6	66.6%	30.1%	3.3%			Ylenia
6	61.9%	32.1%	6.0%			Ylenia
6	57.9%	34.9%	7.2%			Ylenia
6	54.3%	38.6%	7.1%			Ylenia
7	55.6%	32.6%	11.8%			Not Shown
7	51.4%	37.6%	11.0%			Not Shown
7	48.2%	42.5%	9.3%			Not Shown
7	47.7%	45.3%	7.0%			Not Shown
8	49.5%	45.5%	5.0%			Not Shown
8	53.5%	41.4%	5.1%			Not Shown
8	55.3%	39.4%	5.3%			Not Shown
8	60.1%	35.5%	4.4%			Not Shown
9	58.0%	32.8%	9.2%			Not Shown
9	53.4%	37.8%	8.8%			Not Shown
9	54.1%	36.6%	9.3%			Not Shown
10	N/A%	N/A%	N/A%	3.3%		Not Shown

== Twists ==
=== Masters and servants ===
On the premiere of Gran Hermano VIP 3, the housemates were divided into two teams, Belén's team and Olvido's team. The audience decided which team would be servants and which team would be masters. The servants had to live in the servant's quarters and can only enter into the noble quarters if one of the masters requires their help. The roles will be reversed. The first team to be the servants were Olvido's team with 74% of votes.

On Day 4, the master group chose Ylenia as the worst servant so she continued being a servant. The servant group chose Víctor as the best master so he continued being a master. The rest of the members of each group switched roles. Kiko on Day 5 passed 2 missions and he joined the master group.

==== Days 1 - 5 ====
- Teams

Servants	Masters
Olvido	Belén
Coman	Víctor
Ylenia	Aguasantas
Sandro	Chunguitos
Ares	Laura
Fede	Israel

==== Days 5 - 8 ====
- Teams

On Day 5 Kiko entered the house and joined the master group. The servant members became masters except Ylenia and the master members became servants except Víctor. The captains remained the same.

Servants	Masters
Belén	Olvido
Aguasantas	Ares
Israel	Coman
Laura	Fede
Ylenia	Kiko
	Sandro
Víctor

=== Heaven and Hell ===
==== Days 19 - 22 ====
Heaven	Hell
Aguasantas	Ares*
Belén	Coman
Fede	Laura
Israel*	Kiko
Víctor	
Ylenia

- After spending a day, Ares leaves the Hell for medical problems and a history of epilepsy. Ylenia, as oracle sent Israel to hell replacing Ares.

==== Days 22 - 26 ====
Gran Hermano order to the Oracle (Ylenia) change the status of the contestants in the task, she has to send one from hell to heaven (Israel) and two from heaven to hell (Aguasantas & Víctor).

Heaven	Hell
Ares	Aguasantas
Belén	Coman
Fede	Laura
Israel	Víctor
Ylenia	

== Ratings ==
=== "Galas" ===
- On Thursdays.

Show N°	Day	Viewers	Ratings share
1 - Launch	Sunday, January 11	3.463.000	23,7%
2	Thursday, January 15	4.343.000	31,5%
3	Thursday, January 22	3.675.000	26,9%
4	Thursday, January 29	3.996.000	29,3%
5	Thursday, February 5	4.091.000	29,7%
6	Thursday, February 12	3.901.000	29,6%
7	Thursday, February 19	4.138.000	30,7%
8	Thursday, February 26	3.896.000	29,0%
9	Thursday, March 5	4.041.000	30,8%
10	Thursday, March 12	3.624.000	29,9%
11	Thursday, March 19	4.052.000	31,6%
12	Wednesday, March 25	3.718.000	28,7%
13 - Final	Thursday, March 26	4.919.000	35,9%

=== "Debates" ===
Show N°	Day	Viewers	Ratings share
1	Sunday, January 18	3.028.000	19,9%
2	Sunday, January 25	2.886.000	19,6%
3	Sunday, February 1	3.268.000	22,4%
4	Sunday, February 8	3.422.000	23,5%
5	Sunday, February 15	3.251.000	21,5%
6	Sunday, February 22	3.314.000	23,0%
7	Sunday, March 1	2.835.000	19,9%
8	Sunday, March 8	2.900.000	20,9%
9	Sunday, March 15	2.522.000	17,8%
10	Sunday, March 22	2.574.000	18,3%
11	Sunday, March 29	3.167.000	17,1%
12 - Final	Sunday, April 5	1.692.000	13,8%

== See also ==
- Main Article about the show
