= Gran Hermano Dúo =

Spanish television show

- Presented by: Jorge Javier Vázquez (Gala 1–11); Jordi González (Gala 12–Final)
- No. of days: 94
- No. of housemates: 16
- Winner: María Jesús Ruiz
- Runner-up: Kiko Rivera
- No. of episodes: 16

Release
- Original network: Telecinco
- Original release: 8 January – 11 April 2019

Season chronology
- Next → Gran Hermano Dúo 2

Gran Hermano Dúo is a spin-off of the Spanish reality TV franchise Gran Hermano. The first season was launched in January 2019 on Telecinco. Jorge Javier Vázquez is the host of this version of the show. Jordi González came back as the host of the weekly Debate. The format is that housemates will be entering in the house with a current or former relationship.

== Housemates ==
The first official housemates of the season, Kiko Rivera and Irene Rosales, were announced on 20 December 2018, during the finale of Gran Hermano VIP 6. The rest of the housemates were confirmed days later and, some of them, during the first episode of the season.

Housemates	Age	Famous for being...	Entered	Exited	Status
María Jesús Ruiz Julio's ex-girlfriend	36	Miss Spain 2004 and actress	Day 1	Day 94	Winner
Kiko Rivera Irene's husband	35	DJ, Isabel Pantoja's son	Day 1	Day 94	Runner-up
Alejandro Albalá Sofía's ex-boyfriend	24	Isa Pantoja's ex-husband	Day 1	Day 93	14th evicted
Juan Miguel Martínez Yurena's ex-showmance	62	Karina's ex-husband	Day 1	Day 93	13th evicted
Irene Rosales Kiko's wife	27	Influencer	Day 1	Day 87	12th evicted
Sofía Suescun Alejandro's ex-girlfriend	22	Gran Hermano 16 winner	Day 1	Day 31	4th evicted
Sofía Suescun Alejandro's ex-girlfriend	22	Gran Hermano 16 winner	Day 48	Day 80	11th evicted
Carolina Sobe Julio's affair	46	Gran Hermano 11 contestant	Day 1	Day 73	10th evicted
Antonio Tejado Candela's boyfriend	32	TV personality	Day 1	Day 66	9th evicted
Ylenia Padilla Fede's ex-girlfriend	30	Gandia Shore star	Day 1	Day 59	8th evicted
Raquel Martín Fede's ex-girlfriend	32	Gran Hermano 16 contestant	Day 1	Day 52	7th evicted
Yoli Sáez Fortu's girlfriend	48	Public clerk	Day 1	Day 45	6th evicted
Fortu Yoli's boyfriend	64	Obús frontman	Day 1	Day 38	5th evicted
Julio Ruz M.ª Jesús' ex, Carolina's affair	36	Businessman	Day 1	Day 27	Ejected
Candela Acevedo Antonio's girlfriend	28	Nurse	Day 1	Day 24	3rd evicted
Yurena Juan Miguel's ex-showmance	49	Singer	Day 1	Day 17	2nd evicted
Fede Rebecchi Raquel & Ylenia's ex-boyfriend	30	MYHYV star	Day 1	Day 10	1st evicted

== Nominations table ==
	Duos Phase						Individual Phase							
	Week 1	Week 2	Week 3	Week 4	Week 5	Week 6	Week 7	Week 8	Week 9	Week 10	Week 11	Week 12	Week 13 Final	
Head(s) of Household	Irene & Kiko	Fortu & Yoli	Alejandro & Sofía	Irene & Kiko	Antonio & Juanmi	Irene & Kiko	Ylenia	Kiko	Sofía	Alejandro	none			
María Jesús	Fede, Raquel & Ylenia; Fortu & Yoli	Juanmi & Yurena; Antonio & Candela	Antonio & Candela; Juanmi	Alejandro & Sofía; Antonio & Juanmi	Fortu & Yoli; Alejandro	Alejandro & Yoli; Antonio & Juanmi	Kiko; Alejandro; Irene	Antonio; Alejandro; Carolina	Antonio; Carolina; Alejandro	Carolina; Irene; Kiko	Alejandro; Kiko; Irene	No; Nominations	No; Nominations	Winner (Day 94)
Kiko	Fortu & Yoli; Carolina, Julio & M.ª Jesús	Alejandro & Sofía; Raquel & Ylenia	Raquel & Ylenia; Juanmi	Fortu & Yoli; Alejandro & Sofía	Fortu & Yoli; Alejandro	Raquel & Ylenia; Alejandro & Yoli	M.ª Jesús; Carolina; Raquel	M.ª Jesús; Carolina; Ylenia	Carolina; M.ª Jesús; Juanmi	M.ª Jesús; Juanmi; Sofía	Sofía; Juanmi; M.ª Jesús	No; Nominations	No; Nominations	Runner-up (Day 94)
Alejandro	Fede, Raquel & Ylenia; Antonio & Candela	Irene & Kiko; Juanmi & Yurena	Antonio & Candela; Irene & Kiko	Carolina, Julio & M.ª Jesús; Fortu & Yoli	Fortu & Yoli; Carolina & M.ª Jesús	Carolina & M.ª Jesús; Antonio & Juanmi	M.ª Jesús; Raquel; Juanmi	Not eligible	Juanmi; Carolina; M.ª Jesús	Carolina; Juanmi; M.ª Jesús	Sofía; Juanmi; M.ª Jesús	No; Nominations	No; Nominations	Evicted (Day 93)
Juanmi	Fortu & Yoli; Alejandro & Sofía	Antonio & Candela; Carolina, Julio & M.ª Jesús	Carolina, Julio & M.ª Jesús; Raquel & Ylenia	Carolina, Julio & M.ª Jesús; Fortu & Yoli	Fortu & Yoli; Raquel & Ylenia	Raquel & Ylenia; Alejandro & Yoli	Carolina; Alejandro; Raquel	Antonio; Alejandro; Carolina	Carolina; Alejandro; Antonio	Carolina; Sofía; Kiko	Sofía; Alejandro; Kiko	No; Nominations	No; Nominations	Evicted (Day 93)
Irene	Fortu & Yoli; Carolina, Julio & M.ª Jesús	Alejandro & Sofía; Raquel & Ylenia	Raquel & Ylenia; Juanmi	Fortu & Yoli; Alejandro & Sofía	Fortu & Yoli; Alejandro	Raquel & Ylenia; Alejandro & Yoli	M.ª Jesús; Raquel; Alejandro	M.ª Jesús; Ylenia; Alejandro	Alejandro; Antonio; M.ª Jesús	Sofía; M.ª Jesús; Juanmi	M.ª Jesús; Juanmi; Sofía	No; Nominations	Evicted (Day 87)	
Sofía	Fede, Raquel & Ylenia; Antonio & Candela	Irene & Kiko; Juanmi & Yurena	Antonio & Candela; Irene & Kiko	Carolina, Julio & M.ª Jesús; Fortu & Yoli	Evicted (Day 31)		Nominated	Exempt	(6) Antonio	M.ª Jesús; Juanmi; Carolina	Alejandro; Kiko; Irene	Re-Evicted (Day 80)		
Carolina	Fede, Raquel & Ylenia; Fortu & Yoli	Juanmi & Yurena; Antonio & Candela	Antonio & Candela; Juanmi	Alejandro & Sofía; Antonio & Juanmi	Fortu & Yoli; Alejandro	Alejandro & Yoli; Antonio & Juanmi	Raquel; Kiko; Juanmi	Juanmi; M.ª Jesús; Antonio	Juanmi; Antonio; M.ª Jesús	Juanmi; M.ª Jesús; Kiko	Evicted (Day 73)			
Antonio	Fortu & Yoli; Juanmi & Yurena	Juanmi & Yurena; Carolina, Julio & M.ª Jesús	Carolina, Julio & M.ª Jesús; Fortu & Yoli	Carolina, Julio & M.ª Jesús; Fortu & Yoli	Fortu & Yoli; Raquel & Ylenia	Raquel & Ylenia; Alejandro & Yoli	Raquel; M.ª Jesús; Juanmi	(6) M.ª Jesús	M.ª Jesús; Juanmi; Carolina	Evicted (Day 66)				
Ylenia	Alejandro & Sofía; Carolina, Julio & M.ª Jesús	Alejandro & Sofía; Irene & Kiko	Irene & Kiko; Juanmi	Fortu & Yoli; Carolina, Julio & M.ª Jesús	Alejandro; Irene & Kiko	Antonio & Juanmi; Carolina & M.ª Jesús	Kiko; M.ª Jesús; Irene	Alejandro; Juanmi; M.ª Jesús	Evicted (Day 59)					
Raquel	Alejandro & Sofía; Carolina, Julio & M.ª Jesús	Alejandro & Sofía; Irene & Kiko	Irene & Kiko; Juanmi	Fortu & Yoli; Carolina, Julio & M.ª Jesús	Alejandro; Irene & Kiko	Antonio & Juanmi; Carolina & M.ª Jesús	Kiko; Carolina; Alejandro	Evicted (Day 52)						
Yoli	Carolina, Julio & M.ª Jesús; Antonio & Candela	Irene & Kiko; Antonio & Candela	Raquel & Ylenia; Antonio & Candela	Alejandro & Sofía; Antonio & Juanmi	(3) Irene & Kiko; Alejandro; Carolina & M.ª Jesús	Carolina & M.ª Jesús; Antonio & Juanmi	Evicted (Day 45)							
Fortu	Carolina, Julio & M.ª Jesús; Antonio & Candela	Irene & Kiko; Antonio & Candela	Raquel & Ylenia; Antonio & Candela	Alejandro & Sofía; Antonio & Juanmi	(3) Irene & Kiko; Alejandro; Carolina & M.ª Jesús	Evicted (Day 38)								
Julio	Fede, Raquel & Ylenia; Fortu & Yoli	Juanmi & Yurena; Antonio & Candela	Antonio & Candela; Juanmi	Alejandro & Sofía; Antonio & Juanmi	Ejected (Day 27)									
Candela	Fortu & Yoli; Juanmi & Yurena	Juanmi & Yurena; Carolina, Julio & M.ª Jesús	Carolina, Julio & M.ª Jesús; Fortu & Yoli	Evicted (Day 24)			Nominated	Re-Evicted (Day 52)						
Yurena	Fortu & Yoli; Alejandro & Sofía	Antonio & Candela; Carolina, Julio & M.ª Jesús	Evicted (Day 17)											
Fede	Alejandro & Sofía; Carolina, Julio & M.ª Jesús	Evicted (Day 10)					Nominated	Re-Evicted (Day 50)						
Notes	1, 2	1, 3	1, 4	1, 5, 6	1, 7, 8	1, 9, 10	11, 12, 13	14, 15, 16	17	18	19, 20	21	21	22
Nominated (pre-HoH)	Fede; Fortu; Raquel; Ylenia; Yoli	Irene; Juanmi; Kiko; Yurena	Antonio; Candela; Raquel; Ylenia	Alejandro; Carolina; Fortu; Julio; M.ª Jesús; Sofía; Yoli	Alejandro; Fortu; Yoli	Alejandro; Antonio; Juanmi; Raquel; Ylenia; Yoli	Kiko; M.ª Jesús; Raquel	Alejandro; Antonio; M.ª Jesús	none					
Saved (by HoH)	none	Juanmi	Antonio	none	Alejandro	Antonio	none	Antonio	none					
Nominated for eviction	Fede; Fortu; Raquel; Ylenia; Yoli	Antonio; Irene; Kiko; Yurena	Candela; M.ª Jesús; Raquel; Ylenia	Alejandro; Carolina; Fortu; ~~Julio~~; M.ª Jesús; Sofía; Yoli	Fortu; Raquel; Yoli	Alejandro; Juanmi; M.ª Jesús; Raquel; Ylenia; Yoli	Kiko; M.ª Jesús; Raquel	Alejandro; M.ª Jesús; Ylenia	Antonio; Carolina; Juanmi	Carolina; Juanmi; M.ª Jesús	Alejandro; M.ª Jesús; Sofía	Alejandro; Irene; Juanmi; Kiko; M.ª Jesús	Alejandro; Juanmi; Kiko; M.ª Jesús	Kiko; M.ª Jesús
Ejected	none			Julio	none									
Evicted	Fede; Most votes to evict (out of 2)	Yurena; 63.2% to evict (out of 2)	Candela; Most votes to evict (out of 2)	Sofía; 61.1% to evict (out of 2)	Fortu; 68% to evict (out of 2)	Yoli; 61.3% to evict (out of 2)	Raquel; 55.9% to evict (out of 2)	Ylenia; 61,1% to evict (out of 2)	Antonio; 63% to evict (out of 2)	Carolina; 74.5% to evict (out of 2)	Sofía; 52.7% to evict (out of 2)	Irene; 8.3% to save	Juanmi; Fewest votes to save (out of 4)	Kiko; 48% to win
Evicted	Fede; Most votes to evict (out of 2)	Yurena; 63.2% to evict (out of 2)	Candela; Most votes to evict (out of 2)	Sofía; 61.1% to evict (out of 2)	Fortu; 68% to evict (out of 2)	Yoli; 61.3% to evict (out of 2)	Raquel; 55.9% to evict (out of 2)	Ylenia; 61,1% to evict (out of 2)	Antonio; 63% to evict (out of 2)	Carolina; 74.5% to evict (out of 2)	Sofía; 52.7% to evict (out of 2)	Irene; 8.3% to save	Alejandro; Fewest votes to save (out of 3)	M.ª Jesús; 52% to win

=== Notes ===
This housemate was the Head of Household.
This housemate was directly nominated for eviction prior to the regular nominations process.
This housemate was granted immunity from nominations.

- ^Note 1 : The housemates nominated the first pair with 3 points and the second pair with 1 point.
- ^Note 2 : The HoH won the power to save one of the nominated pairs and replace them with another pair. Irene & Kiko decided not to use it.
- ^Note 3 : The HoH won the power to save one of the nominees and replace him/her with another housemate. Fortu & Yoli decided to save Juanmi and nominate Antonio.
- ^Note 4 : The HoH won the power to save one of the nominees and replace him/her with another housemate. Alejandro & Sofía decided to save Antonio and nominate M.ª Jesús.
- ^Note 5 : Due to Antonio and Juanmi didn't have any pair, they were teamed up as a single pair.
- ^Note 6 : The HoH won the power to save one of the nominees and replace him/her with another housemate. Irene & Kiko decided not to use it.
- ^Note 7 : Fortu & Yoli won 3 extra points in to nominate in the weekly task.
- ^Note 8 : The HoH won the power to save one of the nominees and replace him/her with another housemate. Antonio & Juanmi decided to save Alejandro and nominate Raquel.
- ^Note 9 : Due to Alejandro and Yoli didn't have any pair, they were teamed up as a single pair.
- ^Note 10 : The HoH won the power to save one of the nominees and replace him/her with another housemate. Irene & Kikko decided to save Antonio and nominate M.ª Jesús.
- ^Note 11 : From this round all the housemates are participating individually and each one nominates with 3, 2 and 1 points.
- ^Note 12 : The HoH won the power to save one of the nominees and replace him/her with another housemate. Ylenia decided not to use it.
- ^Note 13 : The public voted among the evicted housemates and the 3 with most votes entered on Day 48. Candela, Fede and Sofía received the most votes to re-enter.
- ^Note 14 : Sofía was exempt from nominations as she returned to the house as an official housemate.
- ^Note 15 : On this round, the nominations were different. Each housemate had to pick a ball which had a different way of nominating. Kiko won HoH. Alejandro picked a ball that didn't let him nominate. Antonio picked a ball which let him nominate a housemate with 6 points. The rest of balls were ordinary nominations with 3, 2 and 1 point.
- ^Note 16 : The HoH won the power to save one of the nominees and replace him/her with another housemate. Kiko decided to save Antonio and nominate Ylenia.
- ^Note 17 : The HoH won the power to give 6 points to a housemate. Sofía decided to give them to Antonio.
- ^Note 18 : The HoH won the power to watch all the nominations and to vote in last place.
- ^Note 19 : This was the last round of nominations and the housemate's relatives nominated instead of themselves.
- ^Note 20 : The public also nominated and gave 3 points to Sofía, 2 points to M.ª Jesús and 1 point to Alejandro.
- ^Note 21 : Lines were opened to save a housemate. The housemate with fewest votes would be evicted.
- ^Note 22 : Lines were opened to vote for the winner.

== Nominations total received ==
	Week 1	Week 2	Week 3	Week 4	Week 5	Week 6	Week 7	Week 8	Week 9	Week 10	Week 11	Week 12	Final	Total
María Jesús	5	2	6	7	2	4	13	15	8	11	7	-	Winner	80
Kiko	-	7	4	-	4	-	11	-	0	3	5	-	Runner-Up	34
Alejandro	4	6	-	7	8	5	6	8	6	-	9	-	Evicted	59
Juanmi	1	7	3	2	-	5	3	5	9	10	6	-	Evicted	51
Irene	-	7	4	-	4	-	2	0	0	2	2	-	Evicted	21
Sofía	4	6	-	7	Evicted		-	-	-	6	13	Evicted		36
Carolina	5	2	6	7	2	4	7	4	11	10	Evicted			58
Antonio	2	5	7	2	-	5	0	7	14	Evicted				42
Ylenia	6	1	7	0	1	6	-	3	Evicted					24
Raquel	6	1	7	0	1	6	12	Evicted						33
Yoli	10	-	1	8	12	5	Evicted							36
Fortu	10	-	1	8	12	Evicted								31
Julio	5	2	6	7	Ejected									20
Candela	2	5	7	Evicted			-	Re-Evicted						14
Yurena	1	7	Evicted											8
Fede	6	Evicted					-	Re-Evicted						6

== Blind results ==
Week	1stPlace to Evict	2ndPlace to Evict	3rdPlace to Evict	4thPlace to Evict	5thPlace to Evict	6thPlace to Evict
1	60.8%	16.4%	12.0%	9.3%	1.5%	
1	58.9%	16.8%	13.3%	9.8%	1.2%	
1	40.4%	27.2%	26.2%	5.5%	0.7%	
1	60.1%	21.1%	14.5%	2.8%	0.4%	
1	57.5%	25.2%	17.3%			
1	40.1%	34.2%	25.7%			
1	34.8%	33.0%	32.2%			
1	34.2%	33.7%	32.1%			
1	39.7%	32.7%	27.6%			
2	44.6%	44.1%	10.1%	1.2%		
2	57.9%	33.1%	7.7%	1.3%		
2	60.5%	30.2%	9.3%			
2	60.0%	31.7%	8.3%			
3	49.3%	32.8%	10.8%	7.1%		
3	53.7%	29.3%	9.5%	7.5%		
3	46.3%	34.3%	10.7%	8.7%		
3	56.2%	43.8%				
3	60.3%	39.7%				
4	56.0%	41.0%	1.4%	1.0%	0.3%	0.3%
4	55.6%	41.5%	1.2%	1.0%	0.4%	0.3%
4	56.2%	40.6%	1.3%	1.1%	0.4%	0.4%
4	51.3%	48.7%				
4	54.9%	45.1%				
4	58.3%	41.7%				
5	63.1%	33.2%	3.7%			
5	65.3%	29.4%	5.3%			
5	62.3%	19.6%	18.1%			
5	68.1%	31.9%				
5	67.9%	32.1%				
5	68.9%	31.1%				
6	64.9%	19.3%	8.9%	3.8%	1.7%	1.4%
6	45.8%	19.4%	13.2%	12.5%	5.6%	3.5%
6	39.5%	27.1%	21.1%	12.3%		
7	50.8%	45.0%	4.2%			
7	48.2%	46.5%	5.3%			
7	47.5%	46.7%	5.8%			
7	49.3%	44.1%	6.6%			
7	50.5%	49.5%				
7	50.1%	49.9%				
7	54.8%	45.2%				
8	61.6%	31.6%	6.8%			
8	51.4%	32.3%	16.3%			
8	46.4%	31.3%	22.3%			
8	36.7%	32.2%	31.1%			
8	34.1%	33.1%	32.8%			
8	34.4%	34.3%	31.3%			
8	50.2%	49.8%				
8	51.1%	48.9%				
8	58.3%	41.7%				
8	60.2%	39.8%				
8	61.1%	38.9%				
9	63.3%	34.1%	2.6%			
9	64.3%	31.6%	4.1%			
9	62.8%	31.4%	5.8%			
9	66.1%	33.9%				
9	66.4%	33.6%				
9	63.8%	36.2%				
10	75.9%	22.3%	1.8%			
10	74.3%	20.3%	5.6%			
10	78.3%	21.7%				
11	44.1%	43.5%	12.5%			
11	44.7%	43.1%	12.2%			
11	47.2%	39.8%	13.0%			
11	46.2%	39.9%	13.9%			
11	42.9%	42.4%	14.7%			
11	50.5%	49.5%				
11	50.6%	49.4%				
11	50.3%	49.7%				
11	51.5%	48.5%				
11	52.3%	47.7%				
12	28.4%	24.6%	24.6%	13.5%	8.9%	
12	32.9%	25.3%	17.7%	15.5%	8.6%	
12	34.4%	24.6%	17.1%	14.4%	9.5%	
12	40.2%	23.3%	14.3%	13.1%	9.1%	
12	42.5%	23.1%	13.1%	12.6%	8.7%	
13	47.5%	25.9%	15.7%	10.9%		
13	44.7%	28.1%	13.9%	13.3%		
13	42.5%	30.3%	14.0%	13.2%		
13	41.6%	31.2%	14.1%	13.1%		
13	55.7%	44.3%				
13	53.9%	46.1%				
13	53.3%	46.7%				

== Repechage ==
The first 6 evicted housemates would face an online voting that will decide which 3 of them will return to the house as candidates to officially become as official housemates.

The repechage was officially announced on Day 45 (21 February 2019). All the evicted housemates (Fede, Yurena, Candela, Sofía, Fortu and Yoli) faced the voting. The 3 most voted housemates entered the house on Day 48, while Fede was the housemate with fewest votes on Day 50 and Sofía was the most voted and became an official housemate on Day 52, therefore Candela was re-evicted.

Ex-housemate	%	Day of elimination
Sofía	54%	Gala 28 February 2019
Candela	46%	Gala 28 February 2019
Fede	3,9%	Límite: 48h 26 February 2019
Yurena	3,7%	Debate 24 February 2019
Yoli	0,8%	Debate 24 February 2019
Fortu	0,6%	Debate 24 February 2019

== Ratings ==
=== "Galas" ===
Show N°	Day	Viewers	Ratings share
1 – Launch	Tuesday, 8 January	2.532.000	22.3%
2	Thursday, 10 January	2.351.000	21.6%
3	Thursday, 17 January	2.513.000	23.3%
4	Thursday, 24 January	2.488.000	22.7%
5	Thursday, 31 January	2.659.000	24.9%
6	Thursday, 7 February	3.005.000	27.8%
7	Thursday, 14 February	2.714.000	26.0%
8	Thursday, 21 February	2.754.000	27.4%
9	Thursday, 28 February	2.879.000	27.5%
10	Thursday, 7 March	3.183.000	29.5%
11	Thursday, 14 March	3.092.000	29.6%
12	Thursday, 21 March	2.727.000	26.5%
13	Thursday, 28 March	2.699.000	26.9%
14	Thursday, 4 April	2.936.000	27.4%
15	Wednesday, 10 April	2.989.000	25.7%
16 – Finale	Thursday, 11 April	3.882.000	33.9%

=== "Debates" ===
Show N°	Day	Viewers	Ratings share
1	Sunday, 13 January	1.965.000	15.6%
2	Sunday, 20 January	2.110.000	16.3%
3	Sunday, 27 January	2.098.000	16.8%
4	Sunday, 3 February	2.264.000	18.2%
5	Sunday, 10 February	2.376.000	19.5%
6	Sunday, 17 February	2.246.000	18.1%
7	Sunday, 24 February	2.398.000	19.4%
8	Sunday, 3 March	2.279.000	18.6%
9	Sunday, 10 March	2.423.000	19.7%
10	Sunday, 17 March	2.208.000	18.1%
11	Sunday, 24 March	2.295.000	19.0%
12	Sunday, 31 March	2.166.000	16.2%
13	Sunday, 7 April	2.191.000	16.9%
14	Sunday, 14 April	2.004.000	16.6%

=== "Límite 48H" / "Límite 24H" ===
Show N°	Day	Viewers	Ratings share
1	Tuesday, 15 January	2.290.000	20.0%
2	Tuesday, 22 January	2.312.000	20.3%
3	Tuesday, 29 January	2.440.000	21.8%
4	Tuesday, 5 February	2.563.000	23.0%
5	Tuesday, 12 February	2.428.000	22.8%
6	Tuesday, 19 February	2.455.000	22.5%
7	Tuesday, 26 February	2.583.000	23.8%
8	Tuesday, 5 March	2.546.000	22.3%
9	Tuesday, 12 March	2.686.000	24.5%
10	Wednesday, 20 March	2.495.000	22.3%
11	Wednesday, 27 March	2.480.000	22.7%
12	Wednesday, 3 April	2.439.000	21.8%
