= Gandía Shore =

- Genre: Reality
- Created by: MTV Spain
- Starring: Cristina 'Core'; José Labrador; Abraham; Cristina 'Cat'; Alberto 'Clavelito'; Ylenia; Arantxa; Esteban
- Country of origin: Spain
- Original language: Spanish
- No. of seasons: 1
- No. of episodes: 14

Production
- Production company: Magnolia

Original release
- Network: MTV Spain
- Release: 14 October 2012 – 20 January 2013

Related
- Acapulco Shore; Super Shore

Gandía Shore is a Spanish reality television series broadcast on MTV Spain. It premiered on 14 October 2012 and is the Spanish adaptation of American show Jersey Shore. It follows the same format as the American and British (Geordie Shore) versions. The show follows the lives of eight participants who live in the Valencian town of Gandia.

It premiered 14 October 2012, and broke MTV Spain's all-time ratings record, with 948,000 viewers and a market share of 4.8%, figures that more than double the Jersey Shore premieres on the Spanish channel.

== Cast ==
MTV gave the list of participants with their descriptions days before the official releases of the program.

Participants	Age	Hometown	Description
Abraham García	21	Campo Real, Madrid	"The crowd here is real crazy"
Alberto Clavel, Clavelito	22	San Antonio de Benagéber, Valencian Community	"C'mon dude! It's okay!"
Arantxa Fernández	21	Villarejo de Salvanés, Madrid	"I'm the queen of the platforms, kids!"
Cristina Serrano, Core	20	Vic, Catalonia	"Pim, pim, pim, don't stop!, pim, pim, pim, don't stop!"
Esteban Martínez	24	L'Eliana, Valencian Community	"Ugly gals for ugly lads, hot lasses for me"
Cristina López, Gata	20	Valencia, Valencian Community	"Meow, meow, mmeeeeeow!"
José Labrador	25	Sagunt, Valencian Community	"I haven't come with the intention of falling in love"
Ylenia Padilla	24	Benidorm, Valencian Community	"Let us goooo to Gandia Shoooore!"

Abraham García is from Campo Real, Madrid and he's 21 years old. He is the most polite person out of his housemates, loves practising extreme sports like motocross, and he takes care of his body and haircut, even though he says he's not obsessed with it. He loves meeting new people and dating lasses too. He considers that sex is something fundamental in life. He's the preppiest of the house, causing a difference between his housemates and him. He defines himself as a "NINI", which means "neither nor" in English: "He neither studies nor works". Also, he is known as the "authentic tanga boy".

Alberto Clavel is a 22 year old from San Antonio de Benagéber, Valencia. His nickname is "Clavelito", which in English means "little carnation". He's considered the most calm and one of the few honest people in the group. Also, he is considered the only one that has no problems with anyone in the house. He loves powerful cars, new technology, and partying. He does not consider himself to have the most fit body in the house.

Arantxa Fernández is from Villarejo de Salvanés, Madrid. She's 21 years old and she's usually described as an impulsive, crazy, and spontaneous girl. She loves partying and she defines herself "The Queen of the Platforms" and "a choni with lots of glamour". She's constantly laughing and having a good time, as she's the funniest gal. She's also a very lazy person. In the first episodes, she intends to have something with Abraham.

Cristina Core Serrano is from Vic, Barcelona and she's 20 years old. Her nickname, "Core", comes from her favourite musical genre "hardcore". She's impulsive and spontaneous, and her passion is dancing. For relaxing, she practices Muai Thai and dancing, as well as going to the gym. She's very sensitive and cries when attacked. Her body and her appearance are the most important things to her. She considers herself a "Daddy's girl". She has more than one strong discussion with Ylenia during the program, making them eternal enemies. She has a boyfriend when she enters the house, but she breaks up with him and has a brief fling with Abraham. A few months after the end of the filming, Core had a plastic surgery to her nose, lips and breasts (This can be seen at the Spanish TV documentary show "Callejeros", chapter "Belleza del Bisturí" issued on Cuatro). Also, she has done a photo shoot naked for Interviú, showing her new breasts to the world.

Esteban Martínez is a 24-year-old man from L'Eliana, Valencia. He is characterized as being responsible and hardworking. Esteban enjoys maintaining his health and physical status. Esteban assumes the role of the mediator of conflicts in his household. Distrustful with women, he prefers them older than him. He has tattooed on his body his fetish Hollywood actresses, Marilyn Monroe and Audrey Hepburn. His interests include electro-house and hip-hop, rugby, and American football. He is a football fan of Atlético de Madrid.

Cristina Gata López is from Valencia and she's 20. She's the youngest of the house. She has a boyfriend, but despite that, she is the horniest gal of the house. She loves partying, shopping, and taking care of herself. She does not stand cockiness and irresponsibility. She's always smiling, funny, and beyond responsible. She won't tolerate being offended and can quickly turn into a tiger. She has some problems with Ylenia, whom she considers overbearing. She practises self-defense and she's a brown belt. She studies veterinary at a university.

José Labrador is 25 years old and is from Sagunto, Valencia. He is the oldest of the house and he considers himself the "macho alfa" of the house. He's very strict with his body and presumes of his smile (he considers it his VIP pass). He loves practicing water sports like kayaking, fishing, and snorkelling. His favourite artists are Red Hot Chili Peppers, System of a Down, and Daddy Yankee. At the beginning, he starts a relationship with Ylenia, but finally they break up because he thinks it is "toxic".

Ylenia Padilla is 24 years old and she's from Benidorm, Alicante. She's the most problematic person in the group. She's very sincere but also very impulsive. She loves drinking and partying and she defines herself as the hottest gal in Benidorm and as an authentic earthquake. She is a very funny and cheerful person, although, in some cases, she has some problems related to the excessive consumption of alcohol. At the beginning, she has a relationship with another housemate, Labrador, but they eventually break up after a number of quarrels. She leaves the house one day before the end of the program due to the various conflicts that she has with her housemates.

=== Duration of cast ===
Cast members	Series 1													
Cast members	1	2	3	4	5	6	7	8	9	10	11	12	13	14
Abraham														
Alberto														
Arantxa														
Core														
Esteban														
Gata														
Labrador														
Ylenia														

==== Notes ====
Key: = "Cast member" is featured in this episode.
Key: = "Cast member" arrives in the house.
Key: = "Cast member" voluntarily leaves the house.
Key: = "Cast member" is removed from the house.
Key: = "Cast member" returns to the house.
Key: = "Cast member" features in this episode, but outside of the house.
Key: = "Cast member" leaves the series.

=== Other appearances ===
- Campamento de Verano
  - Esteban Martínez – Campamento de Verano 1 (2013) - 10th evicted
- Doble tentación
  - Abraham García – Season 1 (2017) - Runner-up
- Gran Hermano VIP
  - Ylenia Padilla – Season 3 (2015) - 7th evicted
- Supervivientes
  - Abraham García – Supervivientes: Perdidos en Honduras (2014) - Winner
  - Arantxa Bustos – Supervivientes: Perdidos en Honduras (2015) - 1st evicted
  - José Labrador – Supervivientes: Perdidos en Honduras (2015) - 2nd evicted
- Gran Hermano Dúo
  - Ylenia Padilla – Season 1 (2019) - 8th evicted

== Production history ==
After the success of the USA format, Jersey Shore, and the British version, Geordie Shore, MTV Spain decided to make its own version of the reality show with the producer Magnolia TV. "We are very excited about this project. Jersey Shore and Geordie Shore are two globally successful programs that have been very successful in Spain, and we have wanted to make the Spanish adaptation from the first moment," said Raffaele Annecchino, CEO of MTV Spain.

After considering a number of possible locations for the program (Ibiza, Conil, Salou or Benidorm), on 19 July 2012 it was confirmed that the city chosen for the shooting was Gandía, in which castings took place in order to select the cast. MTV Spain wanted young people who were explosive, handsome, spontaneous, fun, disinhibited, with a great body, who loved to party and to flirt. On 31 July, MTV confirmed that the name chosen for the program would be Gandía Shore.

The recordings were carried out during the month of August (2012), and since the beginning of the recordings, controversy and criticisms began to emerge. With over six hundred hours of footage and a team of seventy-six people in three consecutive turns to "reflect 24 hours of pure reality", Gandía Shore began.

In September 2012, Gandía Shore was introduced as the big bet for the channel and its eight participants were introduced in pairs and in different consecutive days. Ylenia and Clavelito were the first to be released through the official website MTV Spain on 25 September, followed by Gata and Abraham, Core and Labrador, and finally Arantxa and Esteban.

Gandía Shore was released on Sunday, 14 October, achieving the best opening in the history of the channel and the best debut of digital terrestrial television from the analogue switch off 2010. During his band emission, the docu-reality was the most watched program among thematic channels and second choice for television viewers, only behind the comedy Aída.

Gandía Shore, which prompted MTV scoring the best day of his history (1.5% and 130,000 viewers), recorded a 4.8% of share with almost a million viewers. It also scored its particular golden minute at 11:23pm, when 1,214,560 fans watched the adventures of the protagonists. In the following emissions, despite the lower number of spectators, it continued to be one of the great options for Spanish viewers. It also revolutionized social networks, becoming the most discussed topic during all the emissions.

Such has been the success that the CEO of MTV Spain, Raffaele Annecchino, confirmed on 11 November 2012 on the online newspaper Qué.es that Gandía Shore will have a second series:, of which details are still unknown.

After the huge success among young Spanish people, MTV decided to launch an application for iOS and Android with extra content of the program to provide on the chapters on air. Moreover, on 5 December, a compilation was released with the hits that make up the soundtrack of Gandia Shore like "Angelito Sin Alas" "Bara Bara, Bere Bere" and "Quítate el top".

== Episodes ==
Season	Episode	Issue date	Viewers	Share
1	1	14 October 2012	948,000	4.8%
1	2	14 October 2012	948,000	4.8%
1	3	21 October 2012	750,000	3.8%
1	4	28 October 2012	754,000	3.6%
1	5	4 November 2012	873,000	4.0%
1	6	18 November 2012	644 000	2.9%
1	7	25 November 2012	732,000	3.3%
1	8	2 December 2012	665,000	2.9%
1	9	9 December 2012	750,000	3,5%
1	10	16 December 2012	709,000	3,4%
1	11	23 December 2012	653,000	3,4%
1	12	6 January 2013	627,000	3,2%
1	13	13 January 2013	700,000	3,4%
1	14	20 January 2013	889,000	4,2%

- On 11 November, MTV did not show the sixth episode because it would have clashed with the European Music Awards, which the Gandía Shore boys and girls attended and paraded down on the red carpet like stars.
