= Ylenia Padilla =

Ylenia
- Birth name: Ylenia Ainhoa Padilla Santana
- Born: July 6, 1988 (age 36); Benidorm, Alicante, Spain
- Genres: Latin pop; reggaeton
- Occupation(s): Singer, television personality
- Years active: 2012–present
- Labels: Warner Music

Ylenia Ainhoa Padilla Santana (born July 6, 1988) is a Spanish singer and television personality, currently associated with Telecinco. After becoming a public figure for participating in the reality television series Gandía Shore broadcast on MTV Spain, she started appearing on several Spanish television programmes. Her first single, "Pégate", received a gold certification.

== Life and career ==
=== Early life ===
Ylenia Padilla was born on July 6, 1988, in Benidorm, Alicante a city in the Valencian Community within a real estate family. She began studying law at the University of Murcia, but dropped out two years later. She has Crohn's disease.

=== Rise to fame ===
She started being known in October 2012 through her participation in the reality television show Gandía Shore broadcast on MTV, which received high ratings on television. It was the Spanish version of Jersey Shore. Ylenia was one of the most controversial cast members, who voluntarily left the house three days before the reality show ended. After Gandía Shore, she was invited and interviewed on the Telecinco programmes Sálvame Diario and Sálvame Deluxe. She also made headlines and covers on several Spanish gossip magazines such as Lecturas and Interviú, where she was romantically linked with some reality stars. She also was one of the contestants of Gran Hermano VIP 3 in 2015 where she finished in 7th place. In 2019, she participated in Gran Hermano Dúo where was evicted after 59 days in the house, finishing in 9th place.

== Reality shows ==
Year	Title	Notes
2012 - 2013	Gandía Shore	Cast member, 14 episodes
2015	Gran Hermano VIP (season 3)	7th Evicted
2019	Gran Hermano Dúo	8th Evicted
