= Deep Fake Love =

- Genre: Reality dating show
- Presented by: Raquel Sánchez-Silva
- Country of origin: Spain
- Original language: Spanish
- No. of seasons: 1
- No. of episodes: 8

Production
- Production location: Spain
- Running time: 44–67 minutes
- Production company: Cuarzo Producciones (Banijay Iberia)

Original release
- Network: Netflix
- Release: 6 July – 13 July 2023

Deep Fake Love (Spanish: Falso Amor) is a Spanish reality television dating show hosted by Raquel Sánchez-Silva that premiered on Netflix in July 2023. The series tests the relationships of five couples by separating them and tempting them to connect with other people. Over time, the couples are shown videos of their partners interacting with other people, which may or may not have been manipulated using deepfake software.

== Format ==
Deep Fake Love depicts five couples, four heterosexual and one gay, who have been together for varying periods of time and are challenged to test the strength of their relationships. The couples are immediately separated, with one partner from each sequestered in a house known as Mars, and the others in a house known as Venus. Both of the houses contain a bevy of attractive single people eager to connect with the contestants. Over time, the separated couples are brought to the White Room to meet host Raquel Sánchez-Silva. One by one, they sit in the Chair of Truth and are shown videos of their partners interacting with other people, which may or may not have been manipulated using deepfake software. They must choose whether or not they believe the videos to be true, and the couple who makes the fewest mistakes in their choices wins 100K euros.

== Contestants ==
Couples		Length of relationship
Mars house	Venus house	Length of relationship
Rubén Correia	Isa Bermejo	Eight months
Aida Vila	Manuel Delgado	18 months
Gabriela Fdez de Bobadilla	Ángel Santiago	Five years
Javi Ramón	Paula Di Martino	Nine years
Alejandro Calvo	Ramón Pit	Five years

== Production and broadcast ==
Deep Fake Love was produced by Cuarzo Producciones for Netflix. The first seven episodes were released on Netflix on 6 July 2023, and the eighth and final episode was released on 13 July 2023. A second season was scheduled to debut in July 2024, but was delayed.

== Episodes ==
No.	Title	Original release date
1	"Deepfake Technology"	July 6, 2023
Raquel Sánchez-Silva welcomes five couples, four heterosexual and one gay, who have been together for varying periods of time and will be challenged to test the strength of their relationships. The couples are immediately separated, with one partner from each sequestered in a house known as Mars, and the others in a house known as Venus. Both of the houses contain a bevy of attractive single people eager to connect with the contestants. Though tearful at her separation from partner Manuel, Aida immediately connects with hunky Torres in Mars. Gabriela also finds Torres to be the most attractive man in the house. In Venus, Paula spends time with long-haired Lolo, while Ángel is drawn to Zara. The Mars contestants are brought to the White Room, where one by one Raquel shows them videos of their partners interacting with other people. All five are upset by the footage of their partners in varying stages of intimacy with strangers, until Raquel reveals that what they have seen may or may not have been manipulated using deepfake software.
2	"A ... Not So Real Love"	July 6, 2023
The Venus contestants are equally horrified when they are brought to the White Room and shown their partners' behavior with other people. They are also shocked to learn that the footage may or may not be fake.
3	"Two Girls and a Single Guy"	July 6, 2023
4	"Real or Fiction?"	July 6, 2023
5	"Face to Face and Run for It"	July 6, 2023
6	"A Definitive Goodbye"	July 6, 2023
Alejandro accepts the opportunity to be reunited with Ramón face to face, knowing that the price is elimination from the game. In the White Room, they watch both the real and fake footage of their time in the separate houses. Alejandro and Ramón each declare that theirs is Real Love, and leave the show together after saying goodbye to their respective housemates.
7	"The Venus Triangle"	July 6, 2023
The four remaining couples go to the White Room to view their partners' latest antics for the last time.
8	"Grand Final: The Truth Uncovered"	July 13, 2023
In the White Room, the couples are each reunited, and Raquel shows them both the real and fake footage of their time in the separate houses. Manuel and Aida both declare that their relationship is Fake Love, and will not leave the game as a couple. Ángel chooses Real Love, but Gabriela chooses Fake Love. Javi also chooses Real Love, but Paula ends their relationship by choosing Fake Love. Rubén and Isa both choose Real Love, and stay together. In the end, there is a three-way tie for the $100,000: Ángel and Gabriela, Javi and Paula, and Rubén and Isa.

== Reception ==
Josh Rosenberg of Esquire praised Deep Fake Love, while also calling it "one of the most evil television series I have ever witnessed." Saskia O'Donoghue of Euronews dubbed the series "the cruelest show on TV", and described it as "frankly horrifying".
