= Toñi Moreno =

Spanish television presenter

- Born: Antonia del Rocío Montserrat Moreno Morales; 7 June 1973 (age 51); El Prat de Llobregat (Barcelona), Catalonia, Spain
- Occupation(s): Journalist, presenter
- Years active: 1987–present
- Employer: Mediaset España Comunicación

Antonia Moreno Morales (born 7 June 1973), better known as Toñi Moreno, is a Spanish television journalist and presenter.

== Biography ==
Toñi Moreno was born in El Prat de Llobregat, when her father worked at SEAT, but at age 8 her family moved to Cádiz. She later studied law there, although her vocation was journalism. In 1985, at age 12, Moreno began her radio career on the station Radio Sanlúcar. At age 14, she left the world of voiceover to begin working at Telesanlúcar, the local television station in Sanlúcar de Barrameda. There she made her on-air debut. Later she joined Canal Sur, where she was a reporter for the program Andalucía directo. Since then, she has had an extensive professional career in television, working on shows linked to the regional autonomy of Andalusia such as Tiene arreglo and 75 minutos, which she was on for eight years. After her departure for private television, on Antena 3 she hosted the reality show Libertad vigilada, coordinated the morning magazine Cada día, and worked as a reporter. On Cuatro, she headed the show 1 Equipo.

After years of success on the Andalusian station Canal Sur, Televisión Española (TVE) signed her to host Entre todos, a program of solidarity and citizen participation – the national version of Tiene arreglo. She presented this from 26 August 2013 to 27 June 2014 on La 1. With the start of the new television season on 15 September, she returned to the same channel with another afternoon program called T con T that succeeded the canceled Entre todos. However, two months later, it would be removed from the programming schedule due to low ratings. In June 2015, Moreno began working on the Canal Sur program Los descendientes, which enjoyed critical and public success. Since January 2017, she has also hosted Gente maravillosa, a magazine that tries to empower people who show positive values in everyday situations.

In April 2017 she returned to Antena 3 to present a set of interviews entitled El árbol de tu vida. While this program was still on the air, Telecinco announced signing her to host Viva la vida, a weekend evening magazine. She simultaneously presents this with Gente maravillosa on Canal Sur.

On 20 October 2018, the Mediaset leadership decided to remove Emma García from Mujeres y Hombres y Viceversa, to be replaced by Moreno on 5 November. In this way, García would come to present Viva la vida.

== Controversy ==
In February and March 2014, Moreno was the subject of controversy when her salary of 7,000 euros per week was made public, while almost simultaneously she made interjections during the intervention of a guest on her program who claimed to have suffered emotional abuse from an ex-partner. This culminated with Moreno clarifying that she does not believe someone should denounce abuse publicly if they have not previously reported it to the police. She also added assertions and expressions that came to be described in various media as "out of tune and place." Her salary drew the attention of a viewer who called the program live, directly asking the presenter to donate "at least 400 of the 1,400 euros she earns per program" to aid those affected. Moreno refused, saying that she was doing her job, which was to try to get the person who was affected to get enough calls to solve their problem.

== Personal life ==
Toñi Moreno was romantically linked to journalist María Casado Paredes by the newspaper Vozpópuli in 2016, though she has repeatedly refused to discuss her private life with the media.

== Awards ==
- 2010: Gold Insignia of Sanlúcar de Barrameda
- 2011: Spanish Academy of Television Arts and Sciences Award for Best Current Autonomous Community Program for 75 minutos

== Television programs ==
Year	Program	Channel	Notes
1998–2000	Andalucía directo	Canal Sur	Reporter
2000–2002	Bravo por la tarde	Canal Sur	Reporter
2003–2004	Punto y Medio	Canal Sur	Co-presenter
2004–2005	Cada día	Antena 3	Reporter
2005	1 Equipo	Cuatro	Presenter
2006	Libertad vigilada	Antena 3	Presenter
2008–2009	Tal cual lo contamos	Antena 3	Contributor
2009–2011	75 minutos	Canal Sur	Presenter
2012	Tiene arreglo	Canal Sur	Presenter and director
2013–2014	Entre todos	TVE	Presenter
2014	T con T	TVE	Presenter
2015	Amigas y conocidas	TVE	Contributor
2015	¿Bailamos?	Canal Sur	Presenter
2015–2016	Los descendientes	Canal Sur	Presenter
2017–present	Gente maravillosa	Canal Sur	Presenter
2017	El árbol de tu vida	Antena 3	Presenter
2017–2018	Viva la vida	Telecinco	Presenter
2018–present	Mujeres y Hombres y Viceversa	Cuatro	Presenter
2019–present	Un año de tu vida	Canal Sur	Presenter
2019–present	Supervivientes: Tierra de Nadie	Telecinco/Cuatro	Contributor
