= Big Brother 15 =

Big Brother 15 is the fifteenth season of various versions of Big Brother and may refer to:

- Big Brother 15 (American season), the 2013 edition of the American version
- Big Brother 15 (UK), the 2014 edition of the British version
- Gran Hermano 15, the 2014 edition of the Spanish version
- Big Brother Brasil 15, the 2015 edition of the Brazilian version
- Bigg Boss 15, fifteenth season of Big Brother in India in Hindi

== See also ==
- Big Brother (franchise)
- Big Brother (disambiguation)
