= María Jesús Ruiz =

Spanish model

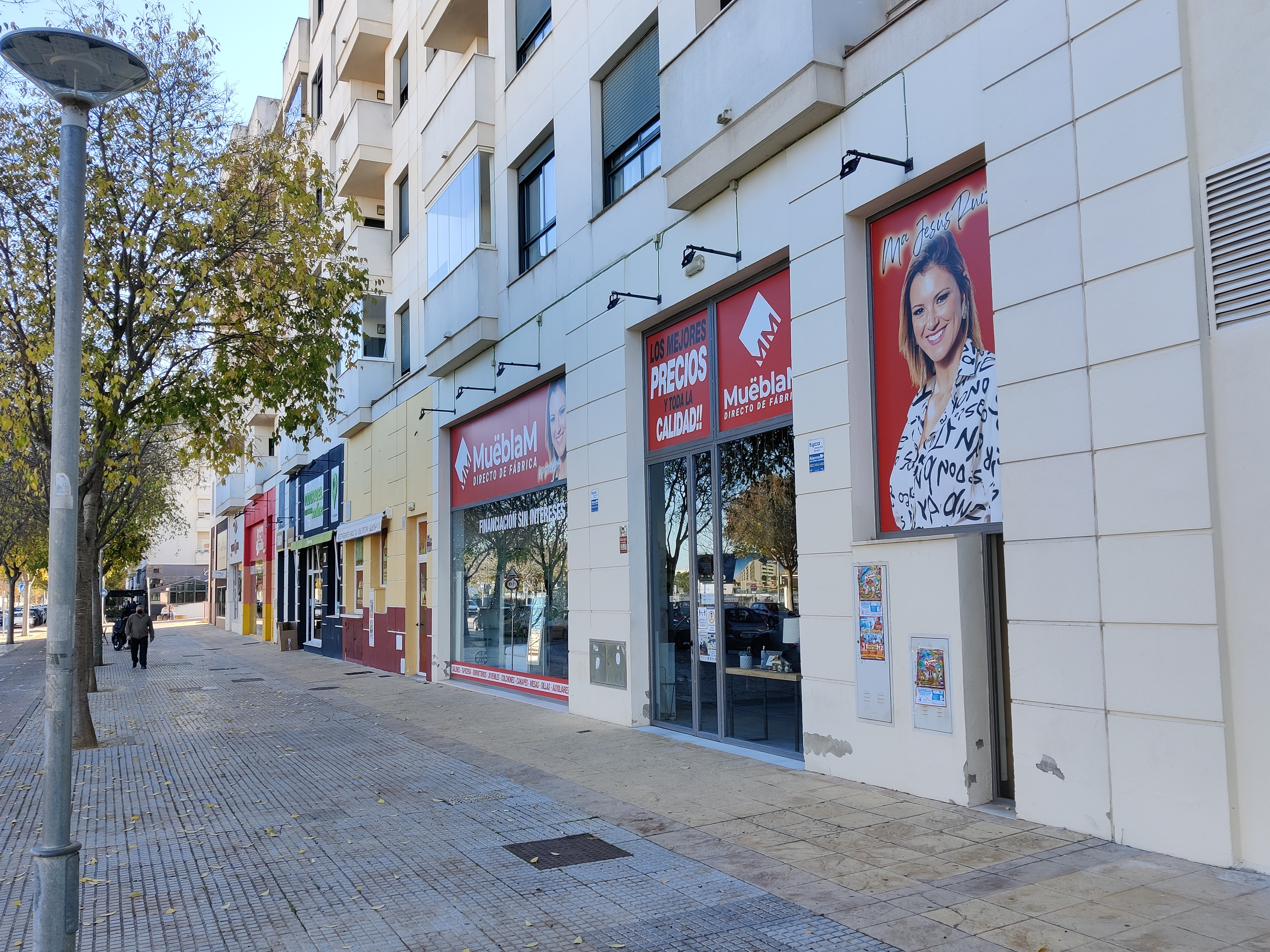
- María Jesús Ruiz in a commercial campaign.
- Born: December 25, 1982 (age 43); Andújar, Jaén, Spain
- Beauty pageant titleholder
- Title: Miss Spain 2004
- Hair color: Brown
- Eye color: Brown

María Jesús Ruiz Garzón (born in Andújar, Jaén, December 25, 1982) is a Spanish actress, model and beauty pageant titleholder who winner of Miss Spain 2004 and represented her country at Miss Universe 2004.

She was a French language teacher in Andújar until she decided to compete in the Miss Spain contest, which she won in 2004. She later, in 2005, was a contestant in the reality show La granja de los famosos. In 2013 she started to work as actress in a soap opera in Miami. She has two children.

== Filmography ==
=== Film ===
- Cómplices (2014) by Luis Eduardo Reyes.
- Sueños por realizar (miniseries) (2014), by Luis Rojas.

Realitys shows
Year	Title	Role	Entered	Exited	Status
2005	La Granja 2005	Competitor	Day 1	Day 54	8th eliminated
2014	Dancing with the Stars Panamá 2014	Competitor with Navir Higuera	Day 1	Day ¿?	5th eliminated
2018	Supervivientes 2018	Competitor	Day 1	Day 78	8th eliminated
2019	Gran Hermano Dúo	Competitor	Day 1	Day 94	Winner
2020	La casa fuerte 1	Competitor with Juani (her mom)	Day 1	Day 35	1st eliminated
