= Raquel Sánchez-Silva =

Spanish television presenter

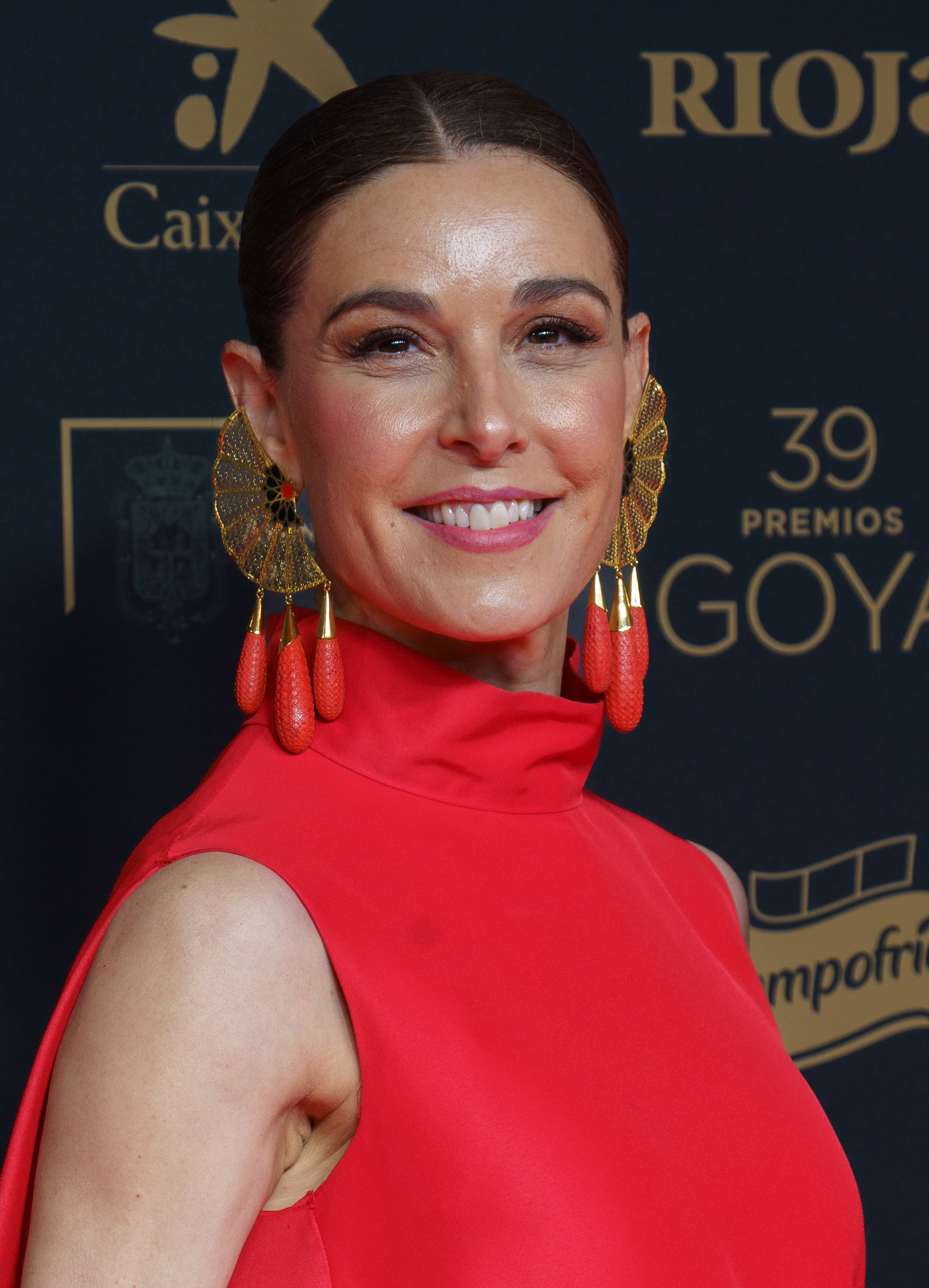
- Raquel Sánchez-Silva in 2025
- Born: Raquel Sánchez-Silva; 13 January 1973 (age 53); Plasencia (Cáceres), Spain
- Website: http://www.raquelsanchezsilva.com

Raquel Sánchez-Silva (born 13 January 1973 in Plasencia, Cáceres, Spain) is a Spanish television presenter and writer.

== Career ==
After studying journalism, Sánchez-Silva started working for a local television in Plasencia. After that, she was a news anchor on Telemadrid, and started working for Canal+ (Noche de los Oscars, La hora wiki) and Cuatro (Soy lo que como, Noche Cuatro, Idénticos, Noche Manga, Oído cocina, a special episode of Supernanny, and special shows about series such as House and Grey's Anatomy). When Cuatro was merged into the Mediaset España group, Sánchez-Silva started working in reality television series on Telecinco. In 2015, she was hired by subscription platform Movistar+ to host, beginning in 2016, a daily talk show titled Likes on the platform's new flagship channel #0.

In 2017, Sánchez-Silva was announced as the presenter of Maestros de la Costura, the Spanish version of The Great British Sewing Bee, on Televisión Española (TVE). On 29 October 2018, she began hosting the daily talk show Lo siguiente, also on TVE. In 2023, Sánchez-Silva was the host of the Spanish reality television series Deep Fake Love.

== TV programs ==
- Deep Fake Love, host (2023)
- Lo siguiente TVE (The Next Thing), (2018–2019)
- Maestros de la Costura, TVE (2018–present) (Spanish version of The Great British Sewing Bee)
- Likes, (2016-2017)
- Gran Hermano VIP, (2015) (Spanish version of Celebrity Big Brother)
- Deja sitio para el postre, (2013)
- Expedición Imposible, (2013) (Spanish version of Expedition Impossible)
- Perdidos en la ciudad, (2012)-(2013) (Spanish version of The Tribes Are Coming)
- Perdidos en la Tribu, (2012) (Spanish version of Ticket To The Tribes)
- El Cubo, (2012) (Spanish version of The Cube)
- Acorralados, (2011) (Spanish version of The Farm)
- Supervivientes, (2011)-(2014)-(2015) (Spanish version of Survivor)
- Pekín Express, (2009-2010) (Spanish version of Peking Express)
- Sanfermines, (2009)
- Visto y Oído (Seen and Heard), (2008)
- Ajuste de cuentas (Score Settling), (2008)
- S.O.S. Adolescentes, (S.O.S Teenagers), (2007)-(2008)
- ¡Qué desperdicio! (What a Waste!), (2007)
- Soy lo que como (I am what I eat), (2007)
- Supernanny, (2006) (Spanish version, special episode)
- Oído cocina (Gotcha in the Kitchen), (2006)
- Noche Cuatro (Cuatro Night), (2005)
- Superhuman, (2005)
- La hora wiki (The Wiki Hour), (2004–2005)
- Telediario, (1998)

== Books ==
- Selección y tratamiento de la información en los telediarios: estudio sobre los telediarios de máxima audiencia de TVE y A3, (1995)
- Cambio príncipe por lobo feroz (I Exchange a Prince for a Bad Wolf), (2008)
- Mañana, a las seis (Tomorrow, at six), (2014)

== Personal life ==
In 2012, Sánchez-Silva married the Italian cameraman Mario Biondo, who died after less than a year. His death was ruled as suicide by the coroners, though the Biondo family has never accepted that ruling and Italian courts have implied that the cause of Biondo's death may have been homicide.

Since 2014, Sánchez-Silva has been in a relationship with Argentine audiovisual producer, Matías Dumont. Together, they have two children: Sánchez-Silva gave birth to twins, Bruno and Mateo, on 21 September 2015.
