= Yurena =

Spanish pop singer (born 1969)

- Born: December 11, 1969 (age 56); Baracaldo
- Other names: Tamara, Ámbar
- Occupation: Singer
- Years active: 1991–present
- Notable work: No cambié (I didn't change)
- Height: 1.7 m (5 ft 7 in)

María del Mar Cuena Seisdedos (born 11 December 1969 in Baracaldo), known under the stage names Tamara (1990–2004), Ámbar (2004–2005) and then Yurena (from 2005) is a Spanish pop singer. Her early career was marred by controversy, but after a five-year hiatus from the music industry while she operated a club, she launched a successful comeback. Her music was introduced to China in 2014.

== Biography ==
She was born in Barakaldo, Vizcaya, Spain. Daughter of Floreal Cuena Ruiz (b. 1936) and Margarita Seisdedos Santos (1928–2019). She began singing in 1990 under the vocal coach Concha Jimenez, with whom she studied for three years in Las Arenas. She prepared a repertoire of ten familiar songs and began performing under the name of "Tamara" at local theaters and pubs, debuting at the Libredon in Portugalete in July 1991.

In 1993 Tamara recorded her first album with songs composed exclusively for her by Northern Studies of Portugalete, including "A por ti" which became a number 1 song years later. She started touring the country and appearing at several radio stations to promote the album. After years of traveling the country, in 1998, she settled in Madrid and met singers Tony Genil and Leonardo Dantés, forming a trio which appeared on various television shows. Finally in 2000 she landed a small part in Crónicas marcianas by Javier Sardà, which was the number one late night television show in Spain. She made tabloid headlines when she claimed to be pregnant by the seer Paco Porras, but the controversy brought her regular appearances on Crónicas marcianas.

That same year, she released a single No cambié written by Leonardo Dantés, which became a number one single, spending ten weeks at the top of the singles chart AFYVE. Following that success, in 2001 she joined the singer Alaska and released a studio album of 14 songs called Superestar which included musicians Carlos Berlanga, Nacho Canut, Joaquin Fernandez (a member of Los Nikis) and Luis Miguélez. She was considered by many a disco diva and had a large club following. She is credited with being one of the few women who ever was on the cover of Zero, (issue No. 23. 2000). The following years found her embroiled in numerous scandals, suicide attempts, and finally she was sued over the use of her stage name by a bolero singer, Tamara Macarena Valcárcel Serrano.

== Rebirth as Yurena ==
After the suit, for a brief time she used the stage name Ambar, but settled on the name Yurena. In May 2005 she launched a Maxi single with 2 tracks + 2 remixes called "Vuelvo", which received favorable reviews. After she and her mother were attacked on the street in Madrid, Yurena announced that she was no longer going to sing but would operate a nightclub in Madrid. She opened "Glam Street", in the neighborhood of Malasaña, featuring rock of the 80s and 90s, which she operated for five years.

She returned to recording in 2012, releasing both "Everynight" and "Go" in English and reached the top of the charts with "Go". In 2014, she began touring in China, made a documentary about the experience released "Around the World" which became a YouTube sensation, and in 2015, released "My Life".

== Discography ==
=== Albums ===
- A por ti (1993)
- Planeta Tamara (2001)
- Tamara Superestar (2001)
- Around The World (2016)

=== Maxi singles ===
- "A por ti / No cambié" (2000)
- "No cambié" editado en México (2000)
- "Tiembla Tamara" (2001)
- "Tú vas a ser mi hombre" (The Club Mixes) (2001)
- "Yo soy así" (2003)
- "Vuelvo" (2005)
- "Everynight" (2012)
- "Go" (2012)
- "Forget" (2013)
- "On the Dancefloor / No Cambie" (Remix 2014)
- "Around the World" (2014)
- "My Life" (2015)
- "Take On Me" (2015)
- "Freedom" (2017)
