= Campo Real =

Coordinates: 40°20′N 3°23′W

- Flag Coat of arms

- Location of Campo Real in Madrid

- Location in Spain.
- Country: Spain
- Autonomous community: Madrid

Area
  - Total: 61.75 km^{2} (23.84 sq mi)
- Elevation: 777 m (2,549 ft)

Population (2025-01-01)
  - Total: 6,974
  - Density: 112.9/km^{2} (292.5/sq mi)
- Time zone: UTC+1 (CET)
  - Summer (DST): UTC+2 (CEST)
- Website: www.camporeal.es

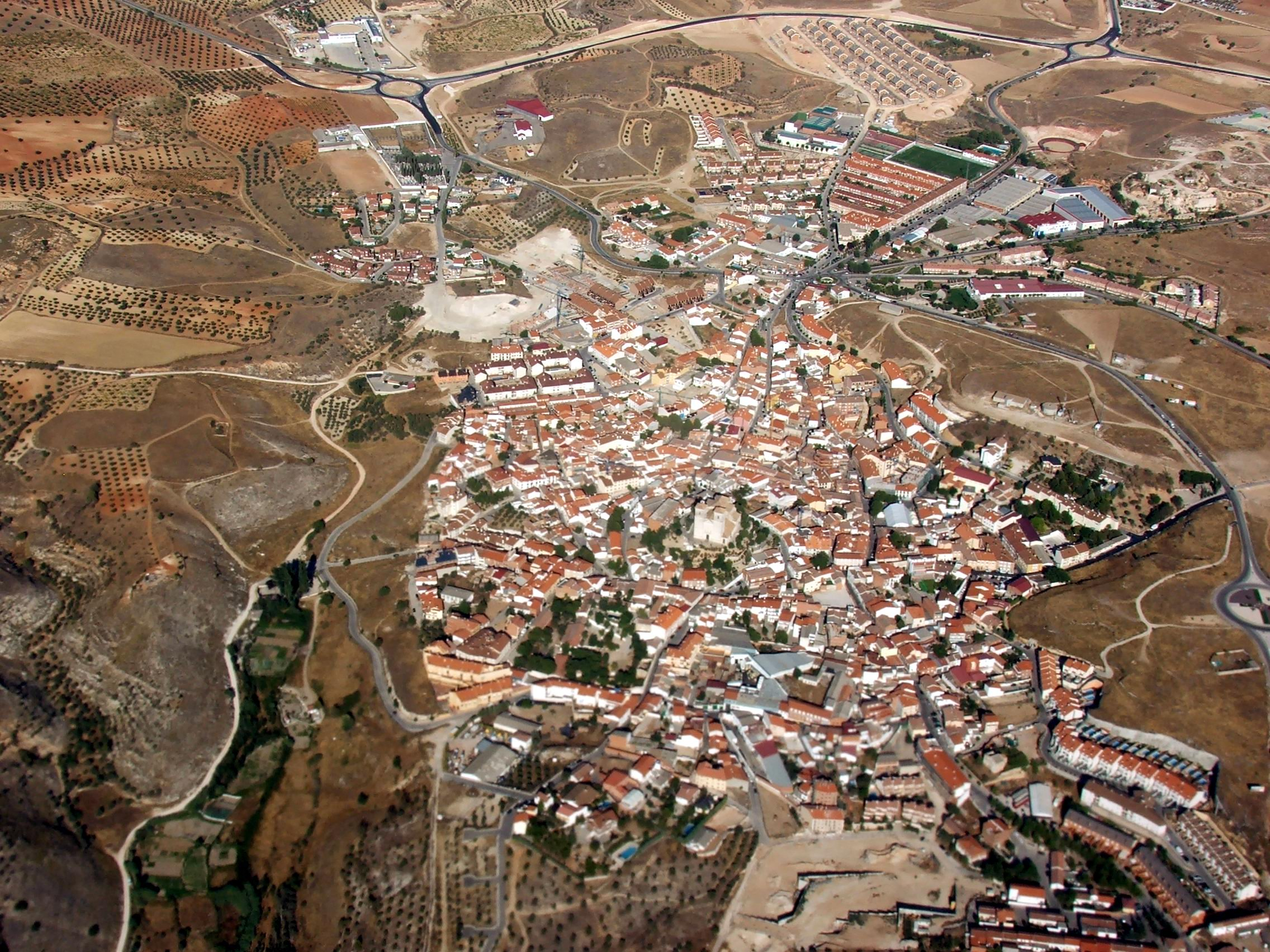

Campo Real is a town of around 6000 people in Spain, around 20 kilometers east of Madrid.

It includes a notable church, the Iglesia de Santa Maria del Castillo.

The town was first recorded as Aldea Campo, during the Moorish period it was known as Campo de Almonacid. It was given its current name ("royal field") by Philip II of Spain in 1580.
