= Gran Hermano (Spanish TV series) season 15 =

Gran Hermano
- Season 15
- Presented by: Mercedes Milá
- No. of days: 92
- No. of housemates: 18
- Winner: Paula González
- Runner-up: Alejandra González
- No. of episodes: 16

Release
- Original network: Telecinco
- Original release: September 18 – December 18, 2014

Season chronology
- ← Previous; Season 14 Next → Season 16

Gran Hermano 15 is the fifteenth season of Gran Hermano, the Spanish version of the reality television series franchise Big Brother. The fifteenth season started airing on 18 September 2014 on Telecinco with Mercedes Mila hosting the main "Galas" and Jordi González hosting the "El Debate", a weekly spin-off show airing on Sunday nights. 17 housemates and a goat called Rubia entered the first day at the GH house. The grand prize, €300,000, was won by Paula González, a 19-year-old shop assistant from Barcelona.

== Housemates ==
Housemates	Age	Residence	Occupation	Entered	Exited	Status
Paula González	19	Barcelona	Shop assistant	Day 1	Day 92	Winner
Alejandra González	20	Albacete	Flight assistant	Day 1	Day 92	Runner-up
Yolanda Claramonte	22	Albacete	Teacher	Day 1	Day 92	3rd Place
Azahara Luque	31	Málaga	Waitress	Day 1	Day 85	14th Evicted
Hugo Pérez	18	Pontevedra	Student	Day 1	Day 85	13th Evicted
Jonathan Pérez	25	Valencia	Sport instructor	Day 1	Day 85	12th Evicted
Juanma Furió	31	Valencia	Surf instructor	Day 1	Day 78	11th Evicted
Luis Ramírez	23	Málaga	Bullfighter	Day 1	Day 78	10th Evicted
Fran Jiménez	47	Málaga	Bullfighter representative	Day 1	Day 71	9th Evicted
Omar Suárez	25	Madrid	Butcher	Day 1	Day 64	8th Evicted
Víctor "Vitín" Aguado	29	Madrid	Telecom Tech	Day 1	Day 57	7th Evicted
Loli Pozo	41	Cordoba	Unemployed	Day 1	Day 50	6th Evicted
Shaima Al-Lal Ahmed	18	Ceuta	Student	Day 1	Day 43	5th Evicted
Alfredo Muñoz	23	Madrid	Hawker	Day 1	Day 36	4th Evicted
Lucía Parreño	23	Madrid	Shop assistant	Day 15	Day 29	3rd Evicted
Mayca Pozo	37	Cordoba	Unemployed	Day 1	Day 22	2nd Evicted
Paco Carmona	40	Madrid	Taxi driver	Day 1	Day 11	1st Evicted
José Casacuberta	24	Barcelona	Seller	Day 1	Day 8	Walked

=== Alejandra ===
Alejandra González (born January 2, 1994) is a 20 year old flight assistant and waitress from Albacete. She entered the house on Day 1 along with her cousin Yolanda and was with her in the house until the end. She was not very friendly with Paula, with whom she had discussions. She was friend of Vitin and Omar. She was runner-up with 29,1% in front of Paula. She and her cousin were nominated all the times that they were not immune. Alejandra exposed herself 3/7 times. She declared that she never wanted to be on Big Brother: she did the screening test because it was Yolanda's dream.

=== Alfredo ===
Alfredo Muñoz is a 23 years old hawker from Madrid. He is gypsy and his half-brother is Omar but Alfredo doesn't know the situation. He entered alone on Day 1 but he joined Omar and Vitín creating the first trio of the season. The program looked for him (he never wanted to be on the show). He is evangelical Christian and he confirms he never watched the show before entering the house. He had arguments with Paula and with Yolanda. He was the fourth housemate to be evicted with 72.9% of the votes on Day 36. It was his first nomination.

=== Azahara ===
Azahara Luque (born December 27, 1982) is a 31 years old waitress from Málaga. She is sensitive and fragile. She hates bullfighting and animal torture and she is vegetarian. She declared that she has a social phobia. She was the last housemate to enter the house on Day 1 and she was able to see everything about the housemates before entering. The following days she had to make a decision and choose a partner and she choose Hugo and Rubia. She developed a strong friendship with Juanma that was misinterpreted out of the house. On week 5, her boyfriend threw balls of tennis to the garden with messages of love and warning her that Fran was hypocrite. In Day 85 she received 8,3 % of the positive votes and did not manage to remain in the house until the end.

=== Fran ===
Francisco Jiménez (Fran) is a 47 years old bullfighter agent from Málaga. He entered on day 1 with Luís who is bullfighter. He affirms he never argued before entering the house. On week 5, Azahara's boyfriend threw tennis balls to the garden with messages warning her that Fran was a hypocrite. The majority of his housemates said bad goodbye messages to him from the set. In the visit from the relatives, his wife asked him to please leave the game. Minutes later, he was eliminated. He was the ninth housemate to be evicted with 63.9% of the votes.

=== Hugo ===
Hugo Pérez is an 18 years old student from Pontevedra. He entered on Day 1 with his goat Rubia. He is dated for 5 months with his girlfriend. He was the younger game player of this season. In the house, he never did anything noteworthy. He never was nominated, and in Day 85 he received the 6,8% of the positive votes and did not manage to remain in the house until the end.

=== Jonathan ===
Jonathan Pérez (born December 29, 1988) is a 25 years old sport instructor from Valencia. He entered on Day 1 along with his cousin Juan Manuel. He and his cousin are pranksters, especially with Azahara, Alejandra and Yolanda. He loves sports and wants to fall in love. In house, he never had arguments with anybody. Yolanda loved her, and she was trying for all the means to conquer him. In Day 85 she received 5,3 % of the positive votes and did not manage to remain in the house until the end, leaving Yolanda very sad.

=== José ===
José Casacuberta is a 24 years old seller from Mexico although he is living in Barcelona for 4 months. He entered alone on Day 1 although at the beginning he had to find his partner Paula in a crowd, they did it and they were let to enter the house. He says he is in love with himself and he calls himself Papirrín-tin-tin. He left the house voluntarily on Day 8 because he didn't feel integrated into the group. The competitors declared that they had seen him trying to flee for a door.

=== Juanma ===
Juan Manuel Fario (Juanma) (born September 26, 1982) is a 31 years old surf instructor from Valencia. He entered on Day 1 with his cousin Jonathan. He was never nominated. He developed a strong friendship with Azahara that was misinterpreted out of the house. On week 5, Azahara's boyfriend threw balls of tennis to the garden with messages of love from Azahara in an attempt about which she was thinking about him. He never exposed himself. He was the eleventh housemate to be evicted on Day 78: he had the fewest votes to save, 4.9% of the votes.

=== Loli ===
Dolores Pozo (Loli) is a 41 years old unemployed housekeeper from Cordoba. She entered on Day 1 along with her sister Mayca. They entered the house thinking they weren't selected to be housemates and were hired only to clean the house. Into the house, she acted like a fortune-teller. She was considered by all as a mother. She likes to lay the cards and manipulate the people. She was the sixth housemate to be evicted on Day 50 with 52.9% of the votes on her first nomination.

=== Lucía ===
Lucía Parreño (born February 10, 1991) is a 23 years shop assistant from Madrid. She entered on Day 15 and she is Omar's ex-girlfriend and Vitín's friend. She is the replacement of José and was paired with Paula. Inside the house, she took again the relationship with Omar and she discussed a lot with Paula. Probably her bad education eliminated her. She was the third housemate to be evicted from the house with 77.3% of the votes on Day 29 on her first nomination. She only rest 14 days in the house. She is considered The villain of the House.

=== Luís ===
Luís de Ramírez (born February 22, 1991) is a 23 years old bullfighter from Málaga. He entered on Day 1 with Fran, his representative. He was close friend of Paula and had a big argument with Omar. He always was trying that the whole world was polite. He exposed 3/6 times to eviction. He was the tenth housemate to be evicted with 52.1% of the votes on Day 78 leaving Paula very sad.

=== Mayca ===
Mayca Pozo (born September 18, 1977) is a 36 years old unemployed housekeeper from Cordoba. She entered on Day 1 along with her sister Loli. They entered the house thinking they weren't selected to be housemates and were hired only to clean the house. She had problems with Paco and Shaima, and seemed the sister with strong character. She was the second housemate to be evicted from the house with 50.8% of the votes on Day 22.

=== Omar ===
Omar Suárez is a 25 years old butcher from Madrid. He is Alfredo's half-brother but he doesn't know. He entered with his friend Vitín but later they were told Alfredo joined them and were a trio. Omar preferred to not tell Alfredo they are half-brothers. He entered on Big Brother the following day of broke the relationship with Lucía. He is a womanizer and is almost always with his cap. Inside the house, he initiated a relationship with Paula. When Lucía entered the contest, he broke the relationship with Paula and returned with her. It provoked many discussions with Paula and with the rest of the house in general. He confessed that he entered the contest because it was Vitín's dream, not his. He was the eighth housemate to be evicted with 53.4% of the votes on his second nomination (on Day 64).

=== Paco ===
Francisco Carmona (Paco) is a 40 years old taxi driver from Madrid. He entered the house on Day 1 with his partner Shaima. One day before entering he was told he wasn't a housemate and he had to take Shaima to the hotel. On the first Gala he took Shaima to the house and then he was told finally he was a housemate and Shaima was his partner. He was the first Housemate evicted on Day 11.

=== Paula ===
Paula González (born September 23, 1994) is a 19 years old shop assistant from Barcelona. He entered on Day 1 with José after finding him between a crowd. She lived 5 years in Hawaii as her parents were divorced and she went to live with her father. She was a very shouting girl that most of the time seemed that she was acting. She fell in love with Omar and became the Lucia's rival for the love of him. She had problems with many people of the house specially with Alejandra, Omar and Lucía, and she always was nominated and exposed because she didn't have partner. She won with 70,9% of the votes.

=== Shaima ===
Shaima Al-Lal Ahmed (born November 18, 1995) is an 18 years old student from Ceuta. She entered on Day 1 with Paco, despite she didn't know he was a housemate. Her family was against her entrance to the house. She is the first Muslim woman who wear veil on Big Brother Spain. The first time that she and Paco were nominated, she declared angered that it was a fault of Paco. Often she was looking like a corset and was giving movement to the house. She was the fifth housemate to be evicted with 52.4% of the votes on her third nomination.

=== Vitín ===
Víctor Aguado (Vitín) (born November 21, 1984) is a 29 years old Telecom Tech from Madrid. He entered on Day 1 with his friend Omar but later Alfredo joined them as a trio. He said that he had wanted to compete in Big Brother from always. He had good friendship with the cousins Alejandra and Yolanda. He was the seventh housemate to be evicted with 66% of the votes on his first nomination because of Omar did, leaving Alejandra very sad.

=== Yolanda ===
Yolanda Claramonte (born August 31, 1992) is a 22 years old public relation from Albacete. She is happy, funny and crazy romantic. She entered on Day 1 with her cousin Alejandra. She was friend of Jonathan, who she loved and tried to conquest. She was the third finalist. She and her cousin were nominated all the times that they were not immune. Yolanda exposed herself 4/7 times.

== Nominations ==
		Week 2	Week 3	Week 4	Week 5	Week 6	Week 7	Week 8	Week 9	Week 10	Week 11		Week 12	Week 13 Final
		Week 2	Week 3	Week 4	Week 5	Week 6	Week 7	Week 8	Week 9	Week 10	Day 71	Day 78	Week 12	Week 13 Final
1	Paula	Alejandra & Yolanda; Jonathan & Juanma	Alejandra & Yolanda; Jonathan & Juanma	Jonathan & Juanma; Alfredo, Omar & Vitín	Alfredo, Omar & Vitín; Loli	Fran & Luis; Azahara & Hugo	Omar & Vitín; Loli	~~Alejandra & Yolanda~~; Omar & Vitín	Alejandra & Yolanda; Omar	Alejandra & Yolanda; Fran & Luis	Alejandra & Yolanda; Jonathan & Juanma	No; Nominations	No; Nominations	Winner (Day 92)
	Alejandra	Paula; Fran & Luis	Paula; Fran & Luis	Alfredo, Omar & Vitín; Paula & Lucía	Shaima; Fran & Luis	Jonathan & Juanma; Shaima	Fran & Luis; Paula	Paula; Fran & Luis	Paula; Fran & Luis	Paula; Fran & Luis	Azahara & Hugo; Paula	No; Nominations	No; Nominations	Runner-up (Day 92)
	Yolanda	Paula; Fran & Luis	Paula; Fran & Luis	Alfredo, Omar & Vitín; Paula & Lucía	Shaima; Fran & Luis	Jonathan & Juanma; Shaima	Fran & Luis; Paula	Paula; Fran & Luis	Paula; Fran & Luis	Paula; Fran & Luis	Azahara & Hugo; Paula	No; Nominations	No; Nominations	Third place (Day 92)
	Azahara	Fran & Luis; Paco & Shaima	Loli & Mayca; Shaima	Alfredo, Omar & Vitín; Paula & Lucía	Alfredo, Omar & Vitín; Shaima	Jonathan & Juanma; Fran & Luis	Fran & Luis; Loli	Fran & Luis; ~~Alejandra & Yolanda~~	Alejandra & Yolanda; Fran & Luis	Fran & Luis; Alejandra & Yolanda	Alejandra & Yolanda; Luis	No; Nominations	No; Nominations	Evicted (Day 85)
	Hugo	Fran & Luis; Paco & Shaima	Loli & Mayca; Shaima	Alfredo, Omar & Vitín; Paula & Lucía	Alfredo, Omar & Vitín; Shaima	Jonathan & Juanma; Fran & Luis	Fran & Luis; Loli	Fran & Luis; ~~Alejandra & Yolanda~~	Alejandra & Yolanda; Fran & Luis	Fran & Luis; Alejandra & Yolanda	Alejandra & Yolanda; Luis	No; Nominations	No; Nominations	Evicted (Day 85)
	Jonathan	Paco & Shaima; Paula	Shaima; Fran & Luis	Alfredo, Omar & Vitín; Paula & Lucía	Alfredo, Omar & Vitín; Fran & Luis	Alejandra & Yolanda; Azahara & Hugo	Fran & Luis; Omar & Vitín	Fran & Luis; Omar & Vitín	Fran & Luis; Omar	Fran & Luis; Paula	Luis; Paula	No; Nominations	No; Nominations	Evicted (Day 85)
	Juanma	Paco & Shaima; Paula	Shaima; Fran & Luis	Alfredo, Omar & Vitín; Paula & Lucía	Alfredo, Omar & Vitín; Fran & Luis	Alejandra & Yolanda; Azahara & Hugo	Fran & Luis; Omar & Vitín	Fran & Luis; Omar & Vitín	Fran & Luis; Omar	Fran & Luis; Paula	Luis; Paula	No; Nominations	Evicted (Day 78)	
	Luis	Azahara & Hugo; Alejandra & Yolanda	Loli & Mayca; Alejandra & Yolanda	Paula & Lucía; Alfredo, Omar & Vitín	Shaima; Alejandra & Yolanda	Paula; Omar & Vitín	Loli; Jonathan & Juanma	Omar & Vitín; ~~Alejandra & Yolanda~~	Omar; Alejandra & Yolanda	Paula; Jonathan & Juanma	Jonathan & Juanma; Alejandra & Yolanda	Evicted (Day 78)		
	Fran	Azahara & Hugo; Alejandra & Yolanda	Loli & Mayca; Alejandra & Yolanda	Paula & Lucía; Alfredo, Omar & Vitín	Shaima; Alejandra & Yolanda	Paula; Omar & Vitín	Loli; Jonathan & Juanma	Omar & Vitín; ~~Alejandra & Yolanda~~	Omar; Alejandra & Yolanda	Paula; Jonathan & Juanma	Evicted (Day 71)			
	Omar	Paco & Shaima; Alejandra & Yolanda	Alejandra & Yolanda; Loli & Mayca	Jonathan & Juanma; Shaima	Shaima; Alejandra & Yolanda	Azahara & Hugo; Fran & Luis	Jonathan & Juanma; Azahara & Hugo	Fran & Luis; Paula	Paula; Fran & Luis	Evicted (Day 64)				
	Vitín	Paco & Shaima; Alejandra & Yolanda	Alejandra & Yolanda; Loli & Mayca	Jonathan & Juanma; Shaima	Shaima; Alejandra & Yolanda	Azahara & Hugo; Fran & Luis	Jonathan & Juanma; Azahara & Hugo	Fran & Luis; Paula	Evicted (Day 57)					
	Loli	Paco & Shaima; Azahara & Hugo	Shaima; Azahara & Hugo	Paula & Lucía; Alfredo, Omar & Vitín	Alfredo, Omar & Vitín; Azahara & Hugo	Omar & Vitín; Fran & Luis	Jonathan & Juanma; Fran & Luis	Evicted (Day 50)						
	Shaima	Loli & Mayca; Alfredo, Omar & Vitín	Loli & Mayca; Paula	Alfredo, Omar & Vitín; Paula & Lucía	Alfredo, Omar & Vitín; Alejandra & Yolanda	Jonathan & Juanma; Azahara & Hugo	Evicted (Day 43)							
	Alfredo	Paco & Shaima; Alejandra & Yolanda	Alejandra & Yolanda; Loli & Mayca	Jonathan & Juanma; Shaima	Shaima; Alejandra & Yolanda	Evicted (Day 36)								
2	Lucía	Not in House	Exempt	Jonathan & Juanma; Alfredo, Omar & Vitín	Evicted (Day 29)									
	Mayca	Paco & Shaima; Azahara & Hugo	Shaima; Azahara & Hugo	Evicted (Day 22)										
	Paco	Loli & Mayca; Alfredo, Omar & Vitín	Evicted (Day 11)											
1	José	Walked (Day 8)												
Nominations Notes		1, 2	1, 3, 4, 5	1, 6, 7	1, 8, 9	10, 11, 12	1, 13, 14	1, 15, 16	1, 17	1, 18, 19	1, 20	21		none
Nominated for eviction		Azahara; Fran; Paco; Paula; Yolanda	Alejandra; Mayca; Shaima	Jonathan; Lucía; Omar	Alfredo; Shaima; Yolanda	Alejandra; Paula; Shaima	Jonathan; Loli; Luis	Fran; Paula; Vitín	Luis; Omar; Paula; Yolanda	Fran; Paula; Yolanda	Alejandra; Jonathan; Luis	All housemates		Alejandra; Paula; Yolanda
Walked		José	none											
Evicted		Paco; 40% to evict	Mayca; 50.8% to evict	Lucía; 77.3% to evict	Alfredo; 72.9% to evict	Shaima; 52.4% to evict	Loli; 52.9% to evict	Vitín; 66% to evict	Omar; 53.4% to evict (out of 2)	Fran; 63.9% to evict	Luis; 52.1% to evict	Juanma; 4.9% to save (out of 7)	Jonathan; 5.3% to save (out of 6)	Yolanda; Fewest votes to win (out of 3)
Evicted		Paco; 40% to evict	Mayca; 50.8% to evict	Lucía; 77.3% to evict	Alfredo; 72.9% to evict	Shaima; 52.4% to evict	Loli; 52.9% to evict	Vitín; 66% to evict	Omar; 53.4% to evict (out of 2)	Fran; 63.9% to evict	Luis; 52.1% to evict	Juanma; 4.9% to save (out of 7)	Hugo; 6.8% to save (out of 5)	Alejandra; 29.1% to win (out of 2)
Evicted		Paco; 40% to evict	Mayca; 50.8% to evict	Lucía; 77.3% to evict	Alfredo; 72.9% to evict	Shaima; 52.4% to evict	Loli; 52.9% to evict	Vitín; 66% to evict	Omar; 53.4% to evict (out of 2)	Fran; 63.9% to evict	Luis; 52.1% to evict	Juanma; 4.9% to save (out of 7)	Azahara; 8.3% to save (out of 4)	Paula; 70.9% to win

=== Notes ===
- ^Note 1 : The housemates nominated the first pair with 2 points and the second pair with 1 point.
- ^Note 2 : After nominations, each nominated pair had to choose which member would be nominated. Paco/Shaima chose Paco, Fran/Luís chose Fran, Azahara/Hugo chose Azahara, Alejandra/Yolanda chose Yolanda and Paula didn't have to choose as her partner left the house.
- ^Note 3 : Alfredo, Omar and Vitín won immunity in a task.
- ^Note 4 : Lucía was exempt from nominations as she was a new housemate.
- ^Note 5 : After nominations, each nominated pair had to choose which member would be nominated. Loli/Maica chose Maica, Shaima didn't have to choose as she didn't have partner and Alejandra/Yolanda chose Alejandra.
- ^Note 6 : Alejandra and Yolanda won immunity in a task.
- ^Note 7 : After nominations, each nominated pair had to choose which member would be nominated. Alfredo/Omar/Vitín chose Omar, Jonathan/Juanma chose Jonathan and Lucía/Paula chose Lucía.
- ^Note 8 : Paula won immunity in a task.
- ^Note 9 : After nominations, each nominated pair had to choose which member would be nominated. Alfredo/Omar/Vitín chose Alfredo, Shaima didn't have to choose as she didn't have partner and Alejandra/Yolanda chose Yolanda.
- ^Note 10 : The housemates nominated the first pair with 2 points and the second pair with 1 point in positive and face to face.
- ^Note 11 : Loli won immunity in a task.
- ^Note 12 : After nominations, each nominated pair had to choose which member would be nominated. Paula didn't have to choose as she didn't have partner, Shaima didn't have to choose as she didn't have partner and Alejandra/Yolanda chose Alejandra.
- ^Note 13 : Alejandra and Yolanda won immunity in a task.
- ^Note 14 : After nominations, each nominated pair had to choose which member would be nominated. Fran/Luis chose Luis, Jonathan/Juanma chose Jonathan and Loli didn't have to choose as she didn't have partner.
- ^Note 15 : Alejandra and Yolanda won immunity in a task, but they were eligible to be nominated.
- ^Note 16 : After nominations, each nominated pair had to choose which member would be nominated. Fran/Luis chose Fran, Paula didn't have to choose as she didn't have partner and Omar/Vitín chose Vitín.
- ^Note 17 : After nominations, each nominated pair had to choose which member would be nominated. Paula didn't have to choose as she didn't have partner, Omar didn't have to choose as she didn't have partner, Fran/Luis chose Luis and Alejandra/Yolanda chose Yolanda.
- ^Note 18 : Azahara and Hugo won immunity in a task.
- ^Note 19 : After nominations, each nominated pair had to choose which member would be nominated. Fran/Luis chose Fran, Paula didn't have to choose as she didn't have partner, and Alejandra/Yolanda chose Yolanda.
- ^Note 20 : After nominations, each nominated pair had to choose which member would be nominated. Luis didn't have to choose as he didn't have partner, Jonathan/Juanma chose Jonathan and Alejandra/Yolanda chose Alejandra.
- ^Note 21 : Lines were opened to vote for the winner. The housemate with fewest votes would be evicted.

== Nominations total received ==
	Week 2	Week 3	Week 4	Week 5	Week 6	Week 7	Week 8	Week 9	Week 10	Week 11	Week 12		Week 13	Total
Paula	3	3	8	–	2	1	3	4	5	2	–	–	Winner	27
Alejandra	4	5	–	3	2	–	~~4~~	5	3	5	–	–	Runner-Up	27
Yolanda	4	5	–	3	2	–	~~4~~	5	3	5	–	–	3rd Place	27
Azahara	3	1	0	1	5	1	0	0	–	2	–	–	Evicted	3
Hugo	3	1	0	1	5	1	0	0	–	2	–	–	Evicted	3
Jonathan	1	1	4	0	6	5	0	0	1	3	–	–	Evicted	9
Juanma	1	1	4	0	6	5	0	0	1	3	–	Evicted		9
Luís	3	2	0	2	5	7	7	5	6	3	Evicted			30
Fran	3	2	0	2	5	7	7	5	6	Evicted				27
Omar	1	–	11	10	3	3	4	4	Evicted					30
Vitín	1	–	11	10	3	3	4	Evicted						26
Loli	2	7	0	1	–	4	Evicted							14
Shaima	7	5	1	7	1	Evicted								19
Alfredo	1	–	11	10	Evicted									22
Lucía	Not in House	–	8	Evicted										8
Mayca	2	7	Evicted											9
Paco	7	Evicted												7
José	Walked													0

== Debate: Blind results ==
Week	1stPlace to Evict	2ndPlace to Evict	3rdPlace to Evict	4thPlace to Evict	5thPlace to Evict	Person with Fewest Votes
2	Not Shown					
3	47.2%	46.2%	6.6%			Alejandra
4	75.51%	12.28%	12.21%			Jonathan
5	65.24%	29.49%	5.27%			Yolanda
6	50.4%	43.1%	6.5%			Alejandra
6	52.0%	41.9%	6.1%			Alejandra
7	64.6%	31.1%	4.3%			Jonathan
8	67.2%	24.5%	8.3%			Not Shown
9	49.1%	47.1%	3.0%	0.8%		Not Shown
10	52.3%	42.4%	5.3%			Not Shown
10	54.3%	40.8%	4.9%			Not Shown
11	57.7%	34.6%	7.7%			Not Shown
12	Not Shown					

== Twists ==
=== GH is lived in company ===
In May 2014, the casting process was open and the first promo of Gran Hermano appointed people could sign up to the casting with someone and it could be a friend, a relative, an animal, a partner... Also individual people could sign up to the casting. On the launch it was revealed that the promos had a second part which was never aired and ruled that you could sign up with someone but you can't choose your partner. On the launch of Gran Hermano 15, 7 pairs, 1 trio and a single housemate entered the house. The pairs were:

- José/Paula, a couple who never met before and were joined by Gran Hermano as they were twin souls.
- Paco/Shaima, a couple who met the day before the launch because Paco was Shaima's taxi driver to the house.
- Fran/Luis, a friend couple who work together as Fran is Luis' bullfighting agent.
- Loli/Mayca, sisters who entered the house thinking they were not chosen and were in the house just for cleaning it.
- Hugo/Rubia, a guy with his goat as pet entered like a couple but later it was revealed Rubia it wasn't a housemate as it was only a pet.
- Alejandra/Yolanda, cousins who entered together.
- Juanma/Jonathan, cousins who entered together.
- Alfredo/Omar/Vitín, the only trio which at the beginning was a friend couple integrated by Omar and Vitín who were friends, but later Alfredo who is Omar's half brother entered and joined them.
- Azahara entered alone and it was established she would choose her partner the following days, creating another couple or trio. She finally chose Hugo.

If a member of a couple leaves the house or is ejected, a replacement would enter the house and would be joined with the remaining member of this couple. The only case was José left the house leaving Paula alone so when Lucía entered as José's replacement she joined Paula as a couple.

=== Nomination/Eviction in company ===
Each pair would nominate a pair with 2 points and another pair with 1 point. If the partner of a couple is evicted or leave the house, the remaining housemate would be nominated individually. At least, the three or more pairs with most votes would face eviction. Then each nominated pair must choose which member of the couple must finally face eviction. But if a housemate is alone because its partner has been evicted or walked the house and is nominated, this housemate is automatically nominated as it has no possibilities to choose.

== Ratings ==
=== "Galas" ===
- On Thursdays and on Sundays (September 21, 28).

Show N°	Day	Viewers	Ratings share
1 - Launch	Thursday, September 18	2.438.000	22,4%
2	Sunday, September 21	1.990.000	15,1%
3	Thursday, September 25	2.185.000	17,5%
4	Sunday, September 28	1.955.000	14,2%
5	Thursday, October 2	2.750.000	21,8%
6	Thursday, October 9	2.942.000	22,8%
7	Thursday, October 16	3.228.000	24,6%
8	Thursday, October 23	2.993.000	23,2%
9	Thursday, October 30	2.723.000	22,0%
10	Thursday, November 6	2.492.000	20,1%
11	Thursday, November 13	2.860.000	22,0%
12	Thursday, November 20	2.779.000	20,4%
13	Thursday, November 27	2.849.000	22,6%
14	Thursday, December 4	2.800.000	22,4%
15	Thursday, December 11	2.905.000	22,8%
16 - Final	Thursday, December 18	3.467.000	27,7%

=== "Debates" ===
Show N°	Day	Viewers	Ratings share
1	Sunday, October 5	2.751.000	19,4%
2	Sunday, October 12	2.026.000	15,3%
3	Sunday, October 19	2.357.000	17,2%
4	Sunday, October 26	2.201.000	17,3%
5	Sunday, November 2	2.270.000	16,7%
6	Sunday, November 9	2.123.000	15,2%
7	Sunday, November 16	2.092.000	13,9%
8	Sunday, November 23	1.906.000	12,7%
9	Sunday, November 30	2.159.000	15,1%
10	Sunday, December 7	1.990.000	14,2%
11	Sunday, December 14	2.252.000	14,9%
12 - Final	Sunday, December 21	2.385.000	16,3%
