= Mujeres y Hombres y Viceversa =

- Genre: Dating show
- Created by: Maria de Filippi
- Directed by: Javier Azcue
- Presented by: Emma García (2008–2018); Toñi Moreno (2018–2020); Nagore Robles (2019–2020); Jesús Vazquez (2020–2021)
- Country of origin: Spain
- Original language: Spanish
- No. of episodes: +3000

Production
- Running time: 65 minutes approx.

Original release
- Network: Telecinco (2008-2018); Cuatro (2018-2021)
- Release: June 9, 2008 – March 25, 2021

Mujeres y hombres y viceversa (English: Women and Men and vice versa; MYHYV for short) is a Spanish dating show produced by Magnolia TV. The show aired on Telecinco since its premiere on 9 June 2008, until it moved to Cuatro on 24 January 2018. The Spanish adaptation of the Italian format Uomini e Donne gained an 18.4% audience share and was the most viewed program among the Spanish audience in its time slot during the first two seasons. The program was hosted by Emma García for 2,613 episodes. In 2018, Toñi Moreno took on hosting duties. In 2019, Nagore Robles stood in as host during Moreno's maternity leave. In 2020, Jesús Vazquez took on hosting duties.

The show aroused some controversy owing to vulgar language.

The program ended in March 2021 after an extended period of declining ratings.

== Format ==
The show is based on the Italian dating show Uomini & Donne, and it is focused on single people. The 'tronistas' (from the Spanish/Italian word 'trono', meaning 'throne', because the protagonist is sitting on an imaginary throne) are 4, usually 2 men and 2 women. These are the protagonists, whose aim it is to find their soulmate among a pool of admirers. Every day, the "tronista" is introduced to a new suitor. The suitor introduces themselves and, based on this, the "tronista" then decides whether he/she would like to get to know them better or not.

The "tronista" also chooses the candidates they want to date outside the TV studio; on these dates, he/she gets the chance to get to know candidates better. There is, however, one fundamental rule which both the tronistas and the candidates must not break: they can only meet each other in front of cameras, never privately. If this rule is broken, they risk being kicked off the show.

At the point in time when the tronista comes to choose their soulmate, there are only a few candidates left awaiting their decision. The tronista can also leave the programme single if he/she so chooses. Another man/woman then replaces him/her on the throne. Each episode features two tronistas. When their dates outside the TV studio are broadcast, the audience can listen to some background music (especially Spanish singers like Danny Romero).
