= Supervivientes: All Stars =

- Presented by: Jorge Javier Vázquez; Laura Madrueño
- No. of days: 39
- No. of castaways: 10
- Winner: Marta Peñate
- Runner-up: Alejandro Nieto
- Location: Cayos Cochinos, Honduras

Release
- Original network: Telecinco
- Original release: 20 June – 28 July 2024

Season chronology
- ← Previous; 2024 Next → 2025

Supervivientes: All Stars is the twentieth season of the show Supervivientes and the twenty-fourth season of Survivor to air in Spain. It is the first all-stars season of the franchise. The season premiered June 20, 2024 and ran until July 28, 2024.

== Changes ==
The first all-stars season of Supervivientes was announced on May 14, when Supervivientes 2018's Sole Survivor Sofía Suescun visited her boyfriend Kiko Jiménez in Supervivientes 2024. She was confirmed as the first contestant.

The season is set to have a reduced length and only ten players, about half of the regular seasons' contestants. Carlos Sobera will not host Tierra de nadie, and instead Jorge Javier Vázquez will take on his role alongside his usual duty as the host of the main galas. Sandra Barneda will still host Conexión Honduras.

== Cast ==
After Sofía Suescun was confirmed as the first contestant alongside the season's announcement, the rest of the players were also announced during the last few galas of Supervivientes 2024. Adara Molinero refused to jump from the helicopter during the first gala and announced she didn't feel like she was gonna be able to participate on the season, but ended up joining the cast three days later, on the first Conexión Honduras.

The full list of contestants is as follows:

Contestant	Original season	Finish
Adara Molinero; 31, Madrid	Supervivientes 2023 runner-up	Quit; Day 1
Adara Molinero; 31, Madrid	Supervivientes 2023 runner-up	1st voted out Day 8
Olga Moreno; 48, Sevilla	Supervivientes 2021 winner	2nd voted out Day 15
Abraham García; 33, Madrid	Supervivientes 2014 winner	3rd voted out Day 22
Bosco Martínez-Bordiú; 26, Madrid	Supervivientes 2023 winner	4th voted out Day 29
Lola Mencía; 27, León	Supervivientes 2021 4th place	5th voted out Day 33
Logan Sampedro; 32, Asturias	Supervivientes 2018 runner-up	6th voted out Day 36
Jorge Pérez; 41, Cantabria	Supervivientes 2020 winner	7th voted out Day 39
Sofía Suescun; 27, Pamplona	Supervivientes 2018 winner	Third Place; Day 39
Alejandro Nieto; 34, Cádiz	Supervivientes 2022 winner	Runner-Up; Day 39
Marta Peñate; 33, Las Palmas	Supervivientes 2022 runner-up	Sole Survivor; Day 39

== Nominations ==
	Day 1	Week 1	Week 2	Week 3	Week 4	Week 5		Final			Total votes
Marta	No nominations	Adara	Bosco	Abraham	Logan	Sofía	Logan	Nominated	Nominated	Sole Survivor (Day 39)	3
Alejandro	No nominations	Adara	Bosco	Abraham	Bosco	Logan	Sofía	Nominated	Finalist	Runner-Up (Day 39)	3
Sofía	No nominations	Olga	Olga	Marta	Jorge	Lola	Jorge	Leader	Nominated	Third Place (Day 39)	8
Jorge	No nominations	Adara	Sofía	Abraham	Bosco	Sofía	Sofía	Nominated	Eliminated (Day 39)		1
Logan	No nominations	Adara	Olga	Lola	Marta	Marta	Alejandro	Eliminated (Day 36)			1
Lola	No nominations	Adara	Bosco	Abraham	Bosco	Sofía	Eliminated (Day 33)				5
Bosco	No nominations	Lola	Lola	Alejandro	Alejandro	Eliminated (Day 29)					6
Abraham	No nominations	Jorge	Jorge	Lola	Eliminated (Day 22)						4
Olga	No nominations	Sofía	Sofía	Eliminated (Day 15)							3
Adara	Quit (Day 1)	Marta	Eliminated (Day 8)								5
Notes	1	2, 3	4	none	5	6, 7	8	none	9	none	
Nominated by Tribe		Adara; Olga	Bosco; Olga	Abraham; Lola	Alejandro; Bosco	Marta; Sofía	Alejandro; Sofía				
Nominated by Leader		Jorge	Jorge	Marta	Jorge	~~Logan~~	Logan				
Nominated		Adara; Jorge; Olga	Bosco; Jorge; Olga	Abraham; Lola; Marta	Alejandro; Bosco; Jorge	Lola; Marta; Sofía	Alejandro; Logan; Sofía	Alejandro; Jorge; Marta	Marta; Sofía	Alejandro; Marta	
Eliminated		Adara; Fewest votes (out of 2)	Olga; Fewest votes (out of 2)	Abraham; Fewest votes (out of 2)	Bosco; Fewest votes (out of 2)	Lola; Fewest votes to save	Logan; Fewest votes to save	Jorge; Fewest votes to save	Sofía; Fewest votes to save	Alejandro; Fewest votes to win	
Eliminated		Adara; Fewest votes (out of 2)	Olga; Fewest votes (out of 2)	Abraham; Fewest votes (out of 2)	Bosco; Fewest votes (out of 2)	Lola; Fewest votes to save	Logan; Fewest votes to save	Jorge; Fewest votes to save	Sofía; Fewest votes to save	Marta; Most votes to win	

- Contestant was leader and whoever they nominated would automatically face elimination (Immune).
- Contestant was nominated.

Notes

- ^Note 1: Adara leave the game on day 1, but she returned on day 3.
- ^Note 2: The first nominations happened during the first Conexión Honduras, on day 3.
- ^Note 3: There was a tie in the nominations with 1 vote among Lola, Marta, Olga and Sofía. Abraham, as the leader, had to break it and he chose to nominate Olga.
- ^Note 4: There was a tie in the nominations with 2 votes among Olga and Sofía. Abraham, as the leader, had to break it and he chose to nominate Olga.
- ^Note 5: There was a tie in the nominations with 1 votes among Alejandro, Logan and Marta. Sofía, as the leader, had to break it and she chose to nominate Alejandro.
- ^Note 6: There was a tie in the nominations with 1 votes between Lola and Marta. Alejandro, as the leader, had to break it and he chose to nominate Marta.
- ^Note 7: Logan won a power in week 3 in which he could save himself or any other nominated contestant and replace them with another contestant only once in this edition. He used it this week and saved himself and chose Lola instead.
- ^Note 8: There was a tie in the nominations with 1 vote between Alejandro and Jorge. Marta, as the leader, had to break it and she chose to nominate Alejandro.
- ^Note 9: Alejandro won the last immunity challenge and went through the final vote. Marta and Sofía were nominated.

== Blind results ==
Week	1stPlace to save	2ndPlace to save	3rdPlace to save	4thPlace to save
1	42%	32%	26%	
1	52%	48%		
1	50.1%	49.9%		
1	50.12%	49.88%		
1	51.09%	48.91%		
2	50%	27%	23%	
2	50%	26%	24%	
2	50.2%	49.8%		
2	52.5%	47.5%		
2	53%	47%		
3	67%	17%	16%	
3	66%	17%	17%	
3	75%	25%		
4	40%	32%	28%	
4	50.1%	49.9%		
4	55%	45%		
4	54%	46%		
5	65%	23%	12%	
5	64%	23%	13%	
5	63%	20%	17%	

== Ratings ==
=== "Galas" ===
Show N°	Day	Viewers	Ratings share
1 - Launch	Thursday, June 20	1.381.000	17.6%
2	Sunday, June 23	1.225.000	17.6%
3	Thursday, June 27	1.314.000	18.6%
4	Thursday, July 4	1.392.000	19.6%
5	Thursday, July 11	1.378.000	20.1%
6	Thursday, July 18	1.218.000	18.3%
7	Monday, July 22	1.247.000	18.4%
8	Thursday, July 25	1.260.000	20.2%
9 - Finale	Sunday, July 28	1.393.000	18.6%
