= Supervivientes: Perdidos en Honduras (2023) =

- Presented by: Jorge Javier Vázquez; Laura Madrueño
- No. of days: 120
- No. of castaways: 19
- Winner: Bosco Martínez-Bordiú
- Location: Cayos Cochinos, Honduras

Release
- Original network: Telecinco
- Original release: 2 March – 29 June 2023

Season chronology
- ← Previous; 2022 Next → 2024

Supervivientes 2023: Perdidos en Honduras is the eighteenth season of the show Supervivientes and the twenty-second season of Survivor to air in Spain. It was broadcast from 2 March 2023 to 29 June 2023. Live galas were shown every Thursday in prime time, while debates happened on Sundays.

== Changes ==
After eight years serving as the "in location" host in Honduras, Lara Álvarez announced her departure from the show, citing her wish to embrace new working projects. That same day, Mediaset España announced weathergirl Laura Madrueño as her replacement.

Jorge Javier Vázquez returned as the main host from the studios, while Carlos Sobera and Ion Aramendi continue to host the side shows and the debates respectively.

It was also announced that this will be the last season of Bulldog TV producing the show, as the disagreements between the broadcaster and the owner of the rights, French company Banijay, has forced Mediaset to award the productions rights from 2024 on to Cuarzo, a filial of the French group, in order to preserve the product.

== Cast ==
The contestants were announced by the official website and through the format's social networks. They were divided even before leaving Madrid, with five contestants being "left out" of the group in Tierra de Nadie. The rest were divided in two tribes via a challenge in the shows premiere, since the eleventh week, when they all finally merged into a single group.

Contestant	Occupation	Original tribe	First Swap tribe	Second Swap tribe	Merged tribe	Finish
Patricia Donoso; 41, Los Angeles	Television personality	Royale				Left Competition; Day 8
Sergio Garrido; 47, Seville	Paparazzi	Tierra de Nadie	Royale			1st Voted Out; Day 25
Gema Aldón; 27, Cádiz	Television personality	Royale				Evacuated; Day 29
Gabriela Arrocet; 49, Santiago de Chile	Television personality		Royale			2nd Voted Out; Day 32
Raquel Mosquera; 53, Madrid	Television personality Supervivientes 2018 finalist	Tierra de Nadie	Royale			3rd Voted Out; Day 39
Katerina Safarova; 25, Khabarovsk	La Isla de las Tentaciones 1 star	Fatal		Cayo Paloma		4th Voted Out; Day 46
Arelys Ramos; 57, Havana	Television personality	Fatal		Cabeza de León		5th Voted Out; Day 53
Yaiza Martín; 43, Tenerife; Ginés' girlfriend	UEFA Pro coach			Cabeza de León	Merged	Ejected; Day 57
Diego Pérez; 30, Santander	La Isla de las Tentaciones 3 star	Royale	Fatal	Cabeza de León	Merged	6th Voted Out; Day 67
Ginés Corregüela; 52, Jaén	TikTok star	Fatal		Cabeza de León	Merged	7th Voted Out; Day 71
Jaime Nava; 40, Madrid	Former Spain rugby union team captain	Royale	Forgotten		Merged	8th Voted Out; Day 78
Manuel Cortés Bollo; 26, Seville; Alma's brother	Cantaor	Royale	Fatal	Cayo Paloma	Merged	Evacuated; Day 88
Raquel Arias; 31, Cáceres	Model and event host	Tierra de Nadie	Royale	Cabeza de León	Merged	9th Voted Out; Day 92
Alma Cortés Bollo; 23, Seville; Manuel's sister	Television personality	Fatal	Royale	Cayo Paloma	Merged	10th Voted Out; Day 99
Artùr Dainese; 32, Milan	International model	Tierra de Nadie	Forgotten		Merged	11th Voted Out; Day 113
Asraf Beno; 27, Ceuta	Míster Universo Mundial 2018	Fatal		Cabeza de León	Merged	12th Voted Out; Day 120
Jonan Wiergo; 25, Valencia	Influencer	Fatal	Royale	Cayo Paloma	Merged	Third Place; Day 120
Adara Molinero; 30, Madrid	Reality television star	Royale	Fatal	Cayo Paloma	Merged	Runner-up; Day 120
Bosco Martínez-Bordiú; 25, Madrid	Martínez-Bordiú descendant	Tierra de Nadie	Royale	Cayo Paloma	Merged	Sole Survivor; Day 120

== Nominations ==
	Week 1	Week 2	Week 3	Week 4	Week 5	Week 6	Week 7	Week 8	Week 9	Week 10	Week 11	Week 12	Week 13	Week 14	Week 15	Week 16	Week 17	Final		Total votes
Bosco	Exempt	Sergio	Gema; Raquel M.	Raquel M.	Raquel M.	Adara	Adara	Asraf	Asraf	Asraf	Asraf	Alma	Adara	Jonan	Adara	No; Nominations	Asraf	Nominated	Sole Survivor (Day 120)	10
Adara	Diego	Diego	Ginés	Arelys	Arelys	Katerina	Manuel	Yaiza	Diego	Bosco	Jaime	Raquel A.	Bosco	Artùr	Artùr	Nominated	Asraf	Finalist	Runner Up (Day 120)	18
Jonan	Ginés	Exempt	Sergio	Gabriela	Raquel A.	Katerina	Manuel	Diego	Raquel A.	Ginés	Jaime	Artùr	Bosco; Artùr	Artùr	Artùr	No; Nominations	Bosco	Nominated	Third Place (Day 120)	10
Asraf	Ginés	Exempt	Katerina	Manuel	Manuel	Yaiza	Ginés	Yaiza	Manuel	Manuel	Raquel A.	Raquel A.	Bosco	Bosco	Bosco	No; Nominations	Bosco	Eliminated (Day 120)		31
Artùr	Exempt	Sergio	Forgotten								Jonan	Manuel	Jonan	Alma (x2)	Not; Eligible	Nominated	Eliminated (Day 113)			12
Alma	Ginés	Exempt	Sergio	Raquel M.	Raquel A.	Adara	Adara	Yaiza	Asraf	Ginés	Bosco	Artùr	Asraf	Artùr	Eliminated (Day 99)					6
Raquel A.	Exempt	Artùr	Gema	Gabriela	Jonan	Yaiza	Asraf	Ginés	Jonan	Jonan	Jonan	Adara; Jonan	Secret	Eliminated (Day 92)						8
Manuel	Diego	Gema	Ginés	Asraf	Asraf	Adara	Adara	Asraf	Asraf	Asraf	Artùr	Artùr	Evacuated (Day 88)							7
Jaime	Patricia	Forgotten									Adara	Eliminated (Day 78)								4
Ginés	Arelys	Exempt	Asraf	Asraf	Asraf	Asraf	Asraf	Adara	Alma	Asraf	Eliminated (Day 71)									10
Diego	Adara	Adara	Katerina	Adara	Adara	Asraf	Raquel A.	Adara	Jonan	Eliminated (Day 67)										6
Yaiza	Not in the game					Asraf	Asraf	Asraf	Ejected (Day 57)											6
Arelys	Ginés	Exempt	Katerina	Adara	Adara	Yaiza	Ginés	Eliminated (Day 53)												3
Katerina	Alma	Exempt	Asraf	Asraf	Asraf	Adara	Eliminated (Day 46)													5
Raquel M.	Exempt	Artùr	Gema	Gema	Jonan	Eliminated (Day 39)														6
Gabriela	Not in the game			Raquel M.	Eliminated (Day 32)															2
Gema	Jaime	Diego	Raquel A.	Raquel M.	Evacuated (Day 29)															5
Sergio	Exempt	Artùr	Bosco	Eliminated (Day 25)																4
Patricia	Jaime	Left Competition (Day 8)																		1
Nominated by Tribe	Ginés; Jaime	Artùr; Diego	Gema; Katerina	Asraf; Raquel M.	Asraf; Jonan	Adara; Asraf	Asraf; Manuel	Adara; Yaiza	Asraf; Jonan	Asraf; Ginés; Manuel	Bosco; Jaime; Jonan	Artùr; Manuel	Adara; Artùr; Bosco	Alma; Artùr; Jonan	Adara; Artùr		Bosco			
Nominated by Leader	Alma; Diego	Gema; Sergio	Ginés; Sergio	Adara; Gabriela	Adara; Raquel M.	Katerina; Yaiza	Adara; Raquel A.	Asraf; Ginés	Alma; Diego	Jonan	Artùr	Alma; Raquel A.	Asraf	Bosco	Bosco		Asraf			
Nominated	Alma; Diego; Ginés; Jaime	Artùr; Diego; Gema; Sergio	Gema; Ginés; Katerina; Sergio	Adara; Asraf; Gabriela; Raquel M.	Adara; Alma; Asraf; Jonan; Raquel M.	Adara; Asraf; Katerina; Yaiza	Adara; Arelys; Asraf; Manuel; Raquel A. Yaiza	Adara; Asraf; Ginés; ~~Yaiza~~	Alma; Asraf; Diego; Jonan	Asraf; Ginés; Jonan; Manuel	Artùr; Bosco; Jaime; Jonan	Alma; Artùr; Manuel; Raquel A.	Adara; Artùr; Asraf; Bosco	Alma; Artùr; Bosco; Jonan	Adara; Artùr; Bosco	Adara; Artùr	Asraf; Bosco	Bosco; Jonan	Adara; Bosco	
Eliminated	Jaime; Fewest votes (out of 3)	Artùr; Fewest votes (out of 3)	Sergio; Fewest votes (out of 3)	Gabriela; Fewest votes (out of 3)	Raquel M. Fewest votes (out of 3)	Katerina; Fewest votes (out of 3)	Arelys; Fewest votes (out of 4)	Elimination cancelled	Diego; Fewest votes (out of 3)	Ginés; Fewest votes (out of 3)	Jaime; Fewest votes (out of 3)	Raquel A. Fewest votes (out of 3)	Artùr; Fewest votes (out of 2)	Alma; Fewest votes (out of 3)	Bosco; Most votes to save	Artùr; Fewest votes to save	Asraf; 48.3% to save	Jonan; Fewest votes to save	Adara; 39.0% to win	
Eliminated	Jaime; Fewest votes (out of 3)	Artùr; Fewest votes (out of 3)	Sergio; Fewest votes (out of 3)	Gabriela; Fewest votes (out of 3)	Raquel M. Fewest votes (out of 3)	Katerina; Fewest votes (out of 3)	Arelys; Fewest votes (out of 4)	Elimination cancelled	Diego; Fewest votes (out of 3)	Ginés; Fewest votes (out of 3)	Jaime; Fewest votes (out of 3)	Raquel A. Fewest votes (out of 3)	Artùr; Fewest votes (out of 2)	Alma; Fewest votes (out of 3)	Bosco; Most votes to save	Artùr; Fewest votes to save	Asraf; 48.3% to save	Jonan; Fewest votes to save	Bosco; 61.0% to win	
Forgotten's Beach Nominated			Artùr; Jaime; Sergio	Artùr; Gabriela; Jaime	Artùr; Jaime; Raquel M.	Artùr; Jaime; Katerina	Arelys; Artùr; Jaime		Artùr; Diego; Jaime				Artùr; Raquel A.							
Forgotten's Beach Eliminated			Sergio; Most votes to eliminate	Gabriela; Most votes to eliminate	Raquel M. Most votes to eliminate	Katerina; Most votes to eliminate	Arelys; Most votes to eliminate		Diego; Most votes to eliminate				Raquel A. Most votes to eliminate							

== Tribes ==
	Pre-merge tribes			
	Royale	Tierra de Nadie	Fatal	Forgotten
Week 1	Adara; Diego; Gema; Jaime; Manuel; ~~Patricia~~	Artùr; Bosco; Raquel A. Raquel M. Sergio	Alma; Arelys; Asraf; Ginés; Jonan; Katerina	
Week 2	Adara; Diego; Gema; Manuel	Alma; Arelys; Asraf; Ginés; Jonan; Katerina	Artùr; Bosco; Raquel A. Raquel M. Sergio	Jaime
Week 3	Alma; Bosco; Gema; Jonan; Raquel A. Raquel M. Sergio		Adara; Arelys; Asraf; Diego; Ginés; Gabriela; Katerina; Manuel	Artùr; Jaime
Week 4	Alma; Bosco; Gabriela; ~~Gema~~; Jonan; Raquel A. Raquel M.		Adara; Arelys; Asraf; Diego; Ginés; Katerina; Manuel	Artùr; Jaime
Week 5	Adara; Arelys; Asraf; Diego; Ginés; Katerina; Manuel		Alma; Bosco; Jonan; Raquel A. Raquel M. Yaiza	Artùr; Jaime
	Cayo Paloma		Cabeza de León	Forgotten
Week 6	Adara; Alma; Bosco; Jonan; Katerina; Manuel		Arelys; Asraf; Diego; Ginés; Raquel A. Yaiza	Artùr; Jaime
Week 7	Adara; Alma; Bosco; Jonan; Manuel		Arelys; Asraf; Diego; Ginés; Raquel A. Yaiza	Artùr; Jaime
