= Supervivientes: Perdidos en Honduras (2024) =

- Presented by: Jorge Javier Vázquez; Laura Madrueño
- No. of days: 104
- No. of castaways: 20
- Winner: Pedro García Aguado
- Runner-up: Rubén Torres
- Location: Cayos Cochinos, Honduras

Release
- Original network: Telecinco
- Original release: 7 March – 18 June 2024

Season chronology
- ← Previous; 2023 Next → All Stars

Supervivientes 2024: Perdidos en Honduras is the nineteenth season of the show Supervivientes and the twenty-third season of Survivor to air in Spain. It premiered on 7 March 2024 and ended on 18 June, with former water polo player Pedro García Aguado winning over television personality Rubén Torres in the final.

== Changes ==
After last season's final, it was announced that it would be Bulldog TV's final series producing the show, a job they had since 2017. This was owing to a disagreement between broadcaster Mediaset España and format rights owners Banijay, that forced Mediaset to commission the show from another production company from 2024 onwards. It was announced that Cuarzo, an affiliate of Banijay, would take on the job for the following series to keep the show on Telecinco.

Following last year's short break, Jorge Javier Vázquez returned as the main host from the studio in Madrid, while Laura Madrueño would continue hosting from location in Honduras, and Carlos Sobera would continue to host the side shows. This series, Sandra Barneda returned to host the Conexión Honduras debates for the first time since 2018, taking over from Ion Aramendi, who had left to host the Factor X reboot.

== Cast ==
As usual, the contestants for this series were unveiled across different programmes on Telecinco. All original seventeen announced contestants were spotted at Madrid Barajas Airport leaving for Honduras at 3 March 2024. On the first live show, a twist was announced where two new "returning contestants" would join the game at a later date. Returning contestants Kiko Jiménez and Laura Matamoros joined the game in the first Debate. Due to the lopsided results in all reward challenges, a tribe swap was announced by producers during the third gala. Due to Zayra being evacuated, Marieta Díaz was announced to enter the game in her place during the fourth gala. After Carmen quit, Debate panellist Nagore Robles was offered her spot, but she declined because she wanted to compete from the start. She was offered a spot next series, as was Zayra, who had left without taking part in a challenge. To fill the vacancy left by Carmen, a repechage between the first five eliminated contestants was held. Mario rejected the chance to go back, and the four remaining evictees (Kike, Laura, Lorena & Rocío) went through a public vote to rejoin the game. Laura won and rejoined the Blue tribe, and she was eventually voted out a couple of weeks before the merge.

The full list of contestants is as follows:

Contestant	Occupation/Famous For	Original tribe	First swap tribe	Second swap tribe	Merged tribe	Finish
Zayra Gutiérrez; 23, Madrid	Media personality	Blue				Evacuated; Day 11
Rocío Madrid; 45, Málaga	Actress and comedian	Red				1st Voted Out; Day 18
Carmen Borrego; 57, Málaga	Television director and panelist	Blue	Red			Quit; Day 22
Lorena Morlote; 46, Madrid	Celebrity hairstylist	Red	Limbo			2nd Voted Out; Day 25
Kike Calleja; 42, Madrid	Journalist and reporter	Blue	Blue			3rd Voted Out; Day 32
Mario González; 30, Madrid; Claudia's boyfriend	LIDLT 5 star	Blue	Red			5th Voted Out; Day 43
Claudia Martínez; 27, Barcelona; Mario's girlfriend	Reality television star	Blue	Red	Red		6th Voted Out; Day 50
Arantxa del Sol; 51, Córdoba	Television host, model and actress	Blue	Red	Red		7th Voted Out; Day 57
Laura Matamoros; 31, Madrid	Influencer and television personality Supervivientes 2017 finalist	Limbo		Blue		4th / 8th Voted Out; Day 64
Javier Ungría; 43, Madrid	Businessman	Red	Blue	Red		9th Voted Out; Day 71
Ángel Cristo Jr. 43, Madrid	Television personality	Blue	Blue	Blue		Ejected; Day 76
Kiko Jiménez; 31, Linares	Television personality Supervivientes 2017 contestant	Limbo		Red	Corinto	10th Voted Out; Day 88
Aurah Ruiz; 34, Las Palmas	Reality television star & WAG	Red	Red	Blue	Corinto	11th Voted Out; Day 92
Miri Pérez-Cabrero; 30, Barcelona	MasterChef 5 finalist & actress	Blue	Blue	Blue	Corinto	12th Voted Out; Day 95
Blanca Manchón; 37, Seville	Olympic windsurfer	Red	Blue	Blue	Corinto	13th Voted Out; Day 99
Gorka Ibarguren; 30, Oiartzun	El Conquistador contestant	Red	Blue	Blue	Corinto	14th Voted Out; Day 102
Arkano; 30, Alicante	Freestyle rapper	Red	Red	Blue	Corinto	15th Voted Out; Day 104
Marieta Solà; 24, Alicante	LIDLT 7 star		Blue	Red	Corinto	Third Place; Day 104
Rubén Torres; 31, Barcelona	Falso Amor tempter	Red	Red	Red	Corinto	Runner-Up; Day 104
Pedro García Aguado; 55, Madrid	Former water poloist & presenter	Red	Red	Red	Corinto	Sole Survivor; Day 104

== Nominations ==
	Week 1	Week 2	Week 3	Week 4	Week 5	Week 6	Week 7	Week 8	Week 9	Week 10	Week 11	Week 12	Week 13	Week 14		Week 15		Final		Total votes
Pedro	Lorena	Rocío	Carmen	Arantxa	Arkano	Arkano	Marieta	Arantxa	Torres	Javier	Kiko	Arkano	Gorka	Miri	Arkano	Gorka	Nominated	Nominated	Sole Survivor (Day 104)	19
Torres	Javier	Rocío	Aurah	Arantxa	Aurah	Claudia	Claudia	Arantxa	Kiko	Javier	Marieta	Marieta	Aurah	Miri	Marieta	Pedro	Leader	Finalist	Runner Up (Day 104)	5
Marieta	Not in the game			Exempt	Blanca	Ángel	Pedro	Torres	Pedro	Pedro	Pedro	Gorka	Arkano	Torres	Gorka	Torres	Nominated	Nominated	Third Place (Day 104)	6
Arkano	Lorena	Aurah	Aurah	Pedro	Pedro	Mario	Ángel	Aurah	Laura	Aurah	Aurah	Kiko	Marieta	Miri	Blanca	Pedro	Nominated	Eliminated (Day 104)		16
Gorka	Aurah	Rocío	Kike	Ángel	Marieta	Marieta	Ángel	Arkano	Ángel	Aurah	Blanca	Kiko	Marieta	Marieta	Blanca	Pedro	Eliminated (Day 102)			8
Blanca	Lorena	Aurah	Kike	Miri	Ángel	Mario	Gorka	Miri	Arkano	Arkano	Arkano	Hidden	Exempt	Arkano	Gorka	Eliminated (Day 99)				7
Miri	Arantxa	Claudia	Ángel	Ángel	Blanca	Javier	Ángel	Blanca	Laura	Pedro	Pedro	Gorka	Gorka	Torres	Eliminated (Day 95)					12
Aurah	Javier	Rocío	Arkano	Pedro	Pedro	Arkano	Miri	Miri	Laura	Gorka	Arkano	Gorka	Arkano	Eliminated (Day 92)						15
Kiko	Limbo Beach					Mario	Pedro	Torres	Javier	Javier	Pedro	Arkano	Eliminated (Day 88)							6
Ángel	Zayra	Kike	Kike	Miri	Blanca	Javier	Miri	Miri	Laura	Gorka	Aurah	Ejected (Day 76)								17
Javier	Aurah	Aurah	Ángel	Ángel	Marieta	Marieta	Claudia	Arantxa	Kiko	Kiko	Eliminated (Day 71)									5
Laura	Limbo Beach					Mario	Exempt	Miri	Arkano	Re-Eliminated (Day 64)										4
Arantxa	Miri	Carmen	Aurah	Pedro	Limbo Beach	Mario	Claudia	Pedro	Eliminated (Day 57)											6
Claudia	Ángel	Ángel	Arantxa	Pedro	Pedro	Arkano	Torres	Eliminated (Day 50)												4
Mario	Arantxa	Miri	Arantxa	Pedro	Pedro	Arkano	Eliminated (Day 43)													5
Kike	Ángel	Ángel	Ángel	Limbo Beach	Eliminated (Day 32)															4
Lorena	Blanca	Limbo Beach		Eliminated (Day 25)																3
Carmen	Ángel	Ángel	Aurah	Left competition (Day 22)																2
Rocío	Aurah	Aurah	Eliminated (Day 18)																	3
Zayra	Ángel	Evacuated (Day 11)																		1
Notes	none	1, 2	none	3, 4	none	5, 6, 7	none		8	none		9	10, 11	12	none					
Nominated by Tribe	Ángel; Lorena	Ángel; Aurah	Aurah; Kike	Miri; Pedro	Blanca; Pedro	Marieta; Mario	Ángel; Claudia	Arantxa; Miri	Kiko; Laura	Aurah; Pedro	Aurah; Pedro	Gorka; Kiko	Arkano; Marieta	Miri; Torres	Blanca; Gorka	Gorka; Pedro				
Nominated by Leader	Arantxa; Aurah	Miri; Rocío	Ángel; Arantxa	Ángel; Arantxa	Aurah; Marieta	Claudia; Javier	Gorka; Pedro	Arkano; Torres	Arkano; Pedro	Gorka; Javier	Blanca; Marieta	Marieta	Aurah; ~~Gorka~~	Arkano; Marieta	Marieta	Torres				
Nominated	Ángel; Arantxa; Aurah; Lorena	Ángel; Aurah; Miri; Rocío	Ángel; Arantxa; Aurah; Kike	Ángel; Arantxa; Miri; Pedro	Aurah; Blanca; Marieta; Pedro	Claudia; Javier; Marieta; Mario	Ángel; Claudia; Gorka; Pedro	Arantxa; Arkano; Miri; Torres	Arkano; Aurah; Kiko; Laura; Miri; Pedro	Aurah; Gorka; Javier; Pedro	Aurah; Blanca; Marieta; Pedro	Aurah; Gorka; Kiko; Marieta	Arkano; Aurah; Marieta; Pedro	Arkano; Marieta; Miri; Torres	Blanca; Gorka; Marieta	Gorka; Pedro; Torres	Arkano; Marieta; Pedro	Marieta; Pedro	Pedro; Torres	
Eliminated	Lorena; Fewest votes (out of 2)	Rocío; Fewest votes (out of 2)	Kike; Fewest votes (out of 2)	Arantxa; Fewest votes (out of 2)	Blanca; Fewest votes (out of 2)	Mario; Fewest votes (out of 2)	Claudia; Fewest votes (out of 2)	Arantxa; Fewest votes (out of 2)	Laura; Fewest votes (out of 2)	Javier; Fewest votes (out of 2)	Blanca; Fewest votes (out of 2)	Kiko; Fewest votes (out of 2)	Aurah; Fewest votes (out of 2)	Miri; 35% (out of 2)	Blanca; Fewest votes (out of 2)	Gorka; 49.997% (out of 2)	Arkano; Fewest votes to save	Marieta; Fewest votes to save	Torres; 46% to win	
Eliminated	Lorena; Fewest votes (out of 2)	Rocío; Fewest votes (out of 2)	Kike; Fewest votes (out of 2)	Arantxa; Fewest votes (out of 2)	Blanca; Fewest votes (out of 2)	Mario; Fewest votes (out of 2)	Claudia; Fewest votes (out of 2)	Arantxa; Fewest votes (out of 2)	Laura; Fewest votes (out of 2)	Javier; Fewest votes (out of 2)	Blanca; Fewest votes (out of 2)	Kiko; Fewest votes (out of 2)	Aurah; Fewest votes (out of 2)	Miri; 35% (out of 2)	Blanca; Fewest votes (out of 2)	Gorka; 49.997% (out of 2)	Arkano; Fewest votes to save	Marieta; Fewest votes to save	Pedro; 54% to win	
Limbo Beach Leader		Laura	Kiko	Laura	Blanca	none						none								
Limbo Beach/ Exile Island Nominated		Kiko; Lorena; Rocío	Kike; Laura; Lorena	Arantxa; Kike; Kiko	Arantxa; Kiko; Laura	Kike; Laura; Lorena; Rocío						Blanca; Kiko								
Limbo Beach/ Exile Island Eliminated		Rocío; Most votes (out of 2)	Lorena; Most votes (out of 2)	Kike; 55% (out of 2)	Laura; 60% (out of 2)	Laura; Most votes to return						Kiko; 46% to save								

Notes

- ^Note 1: Zayra was evacuated during a challenge due to severe back pain at Day 5. She was hospitalized for a few days while the doctors consider the extension of her injury. Due to that, she wasn't present during the second round of nominations. She was wasn't able to nominate but she couldn't receive votes either. At Day 11, she wasn't cleared to come back by the medics so she had to be evacuated.
- ^Note 2: Limbo Beach eliminations took place on Sunday Debates rather in the main Gala. Rocío lived in Limbo Beach for 3 days before being eliminated.
- ^Note 3: Marieta entered as a new contestant on Day 22 and for this reason she was exempt from nominations.
- ^Note 4: After not being able to cope with the island living conditions, Carmen was pulled from the game for evaluation after a panic attack in Day 17. After a few days away, the doctors advised against her going back onto the island. She decided to not go back into the game in Day 22, effectively removing herself from the game.
- ^Note 5: In this week, the Limbo Beach contestants can nominate another contestants from any other Beach.
- ^Note 6: Limbo Beach finished this week. All remaining contestants (Arantxa, Blanca, Kiko) merged back into the existing tribes.
- ^Note 7: A repechage between the eliminated contestants happened to occupy the vacancy left after Carmen Borrego quit. Mario declined to participate. Laura received the most votes to return to the game.
- ^Note 8: Aurah and Miri were caught stealing food from the crew facilities. They were automatically nominated as a penalty for breaking the rules.
- ^Note 9: A televote between the last two eliminated contestants was opened to replace Ángel Cristo.
- ^Note 10: After a tough challenge, Miri and Torres were both leaders of this week, and each one automatically nominated a contestant.
- ^Note 11: Gorka won a power in week 9 in which he could save himself or any other nominated contestant and replace them with another contestant only once in this edition. He used it this week and saved himself and chose Pedro instead.
- ^Note 12: After a tough challenge, Blanca and Gorka were both leaders of this week, and each one automatically nominated a contestant.

== Tribes ==
	Pre-merge tribes		
	Olimpo Beach	Condena Beach	Limbo Beach
Week 1	Ángel; Arantxa; Carmen; Claudia; Kike; Mario; Miri; Zayra	Arkano; Aurah; Blanca; Gorka; Javier; Lorena; Pedro; Rocío; Torres	Kiko; Laura
Week 2	Arkano; Aurah; Blanca; Gorka; Javier; Pedro; Rocío; Torres	Ángel; Arantxa; Carmen; Claudia; Kike; Mario; Miri; ~~Zayra~~	Kiko; Laura; Lorena
Week 3	Ángel; Blanca; Gorka; Javier; Kike; Miri	Arantxa; Arkano; Aurah; Carmen; Claudia; Mario; Pedro; Torres	Kiko; Laura; Lorena
Week 4	Ángel; Blanca; Gorka; Javier; Marieta; Miri	Arantxa; Arkano; Aurah; Claudia; Mario; Pedro; Torres	Kike; Kiko; Laura
Week 5	Arkano; Aurah; Claudia; Mario; Pedro; Torres	Ángel; Blanca; Gorka; Javier; Marieta; Miri	Arantxa; Kiko; Laura
Week 6	Arkano; Aurah; Claudia; Mario; Pedro; Torres	Ángel; Gorka; Javier; Marieta; Miri	Arantxa; Blanca; Kiko
Week 7	Arantxa; Claudia; Javier; Kiko; Marieta; Pedro; Torres	Ángel; Arkano; Aurah; Blanca; Gorka; Laura; Miri	
Week 8	Ángel; Arkano; Aurah; Blanca; Gorka; Laura; Miri	Arantxa; Javier; Kiko; Marieta; Pedro; Torres	
Week 9	Javier; Kiko; Marieta; Pedro; Torres	Ángel; Arkano; Aurah; Blanca; Gorka; Laura; Miri	
Week 10	Javier; Kiko; Marieta; Miri; Pedro; Torres	Ángel; Arkano; Aurah; Blanca; Gorka	
Week 11	Kiko; Marieta; Miri; Pedro; Torres	~~Ángel~~; Arkano; Aurah; Blanca; Gorka	

== Blind results ==
Week	1stPlace to save	2ndPlace to save	3rdPlace to save	4thPlace to save	5thPlace to save	6thPlace to save
1	39%	32%	26%	3%		
1	47%	38%	15%			
2	33%	27%	26%	14%		
2	44%	39%	17%			
3	32%	28%	22%	18%		
3	39.6%	35.7%	24.7%			
3	40.1%	35.1%	24.8%			
4	32%	27%	23%	18%		
4	35.6%	32.6%	32.2%			
4	35.5%	32.5%	32%			
4	50.5%	49.5%				
4	50.2%	49.8%				
5	46%	30%	18%	6%		
5	55%	32%	13%			
6	40%	32%	15%	13%		
6	52%	29%	19%			
6	58%	42%				
7	30%	29%	21%	20%		
7	42%	33%	25%			
8	50%	18%	17%	15%		
8	35.6%	35.5%	28.9%			
8	55.3%	44.7%				
9	30%	17%	16%	15%	14%	8%
9	30%	18%	16%	15%	13%	8%
9	34%	26%	24%	16%		
9	38%	37%	25%			
9	56%	44%				
10	35%	30%	25%	10%		
10	33%	29%	26%	12%		
10	40%	36%	24%			
10	61%	39%				
11	37%	27%	22%	14%		
11	36%	27%	23%	14%		
11	43%	35%	22%			
12	53%	18%	16%	13%		
12	50%	18%	18%	14%		
12	45%	34%	21%			
13	36%	25%	21%	18%		
13	34%	26%	22%	18%		
13	47%	28%	25%			
13	52.5%	47.5%				
13	52%	48%				
14	31%	31%	28%	10%		
14	65%	35%				
14	54%	36%	10%			
14	71%	29%				
15	52%	27%	21%			
15	53%	26%	21%			
15	52%	48%				
15	50.7%	49.3%				
15	50.003%	49.997%				
15	48%	35%	17%			
Final	62%	38%				
Final	54%	46%				

Week	1stPlace to evict	2ndPlace to evict	3rdPlace to evict
2	45%	43%	12%
2	44%	43%	13%
2	45%	43%	12%
2	53.1%	46.9%	
3	45%	31%	24%
3	45%	32%	23%
4	45%	30%	25%
4	46%	28%	26%
4	55%	45%	
5	57%	43%	
