= Supervivientes: Perdidos en Honduras (2022) =

- Presented by: Jorge Javier Vázquez; Lara Álvarez
- No. of days: 99
- No. of castaways: 16
- Winner: Alejandro Nieto
- Location: Cayos Cochinos, Honduras

Release
- Original network: Telecinco; Cuatro
- Original release: 21 April – 28 July 2022

Season chronology
- ← Previous; 2021 Next → 2023

Supervivientes 2022: Perdidos en Honduras is the seventeenth season of the show Supervivientes and the twenty-first season of Survivor to air in Spain. It was broadcast on Telecinco from 21 April 2022 to 28 July 2022 and won by Alejandro Nieto.

This season repeated the same host panel from the previous season: Jorge Javier Vázquez was the main host at the central studio in Madrid, with Lara Álvarez co-hosting from the island and Carlos Sobera hosting a gala in Cuatro, but Ion Aramendi replaced Jordi González hosting a side debate of the program.

== Cast ==
The contestants were announced daily by the network.

Contestant	Occupation	Original tribe	Swap tribe	Merged tribe	Finish
Charo Vega; 65, Seville	Showbiz personality	Fatal			1st Voted Out; Day 18
Rubén Sánchez-Montesinos; 40, Barcelona	IFBB athlete	Royale	Parasite		2nd Voted Out; Day 25
Ainhoa Cantalapiedra; 41, Galdakao	Singer-songwriter	Fatal	Parasite		3rd Voted Out; Day 32
Juan Muñoz; 56, Barcelona	Former Cruz y Raya comedian	Royale	Parasite		Left Competition; Day 39
Desireé Rodríguez; 35, Seville	GH14 finalist & Veneno actress	Fatal	Royale		4th / 5th Voted Out; Day 46
Tania Medina; 24, Las Palmas; Alejandro's girlfriend	La Isla de las Tentaciones 4 star	Royale	Fatal		6th Voted Out; Day 53
Anuar Beno; 22, Ceuta	Actor & television personality	Royale	Fatal	Merged	7th Voted Out; Day 60
Mariana Rodríguez; 31, Caracas	Model & reality television star	Fatal		Merged	8th Voted Out; Day 67
Kiko Matamoros; 65, Madrid	Television panelist	Royale	Fatal	Merged	9th Voted Out; Day 74
Yulen Pereira; 27, Madrid	Fencer	Royale	Fatal	Merged	10th Voted Out; Day 81
Ana Luque; 46, Málaga	Television personality	Royale		Merged	11th Voted Out; Day 85
Anabel Pantoja; 36, Seville	Influencer and television panelist Supervivientes 2014 contestant	Royale		Merged	12th Voted Out; Day 92
Ignacio de Borbón; 21, Madrid	Model, royal descendant	Fatal	Royale	Merged	13th Voted Out; Day 99
Nacho Palau; 50, Valencia	Sculptor	Fatal		Merged	Third Place; Day 99
Marta Peñate; 31, Las Palmas	Reality television star	Fatal	Royale	Merged	Runner-Up; Day 99
Alejandro Nieto; 32, Cádiz; Tania's boyfriend	Mister Spain 2015	Fatal	Royale	Merged	Winner; Day 99

== Nomination ==
	Week 1	Week 2	Week 3	Week 4	Week 5	Week 6	Week 7	Week 8	Week 9	Week 10	Week 11	Week 12	Week 13	Week 14	Final		Total votes
Alejandro	Charo	Charo	Ignacio	Mariana	Marta	Marta	Ana	Nacho	Kiko	Nacho	Nacho	Ignacio	Nacho	Nacho	Finalist	Sole Survivor (Day 99)	11
Marta	Ainhoa	Ainhoa	Ainhoa	Alejandro	Alejandro	Anabel	Parasite						Anabel	Ignacio	Nominated	Runner Up (Day 99)	6
Nacho	Mariana	Mariana	Alejandro	Alejandro	Kiko	Tania	Tania	Anuar	Mariana	Yulen	Yulen	Alejandro	Alejandro	Ignacio	Nominated	Third Place (Day 99)	16
Ignacio	Ainhoa	Ainhoa	Ainhoa	Mariana	Desirée	Anabel	Anabel	Yulen	Mariana	Ana	Ana; Anabel	Ana	Anabel	Nacho	Eliminated (Day 99)		13
Anabel	Juan	Juan	Juan	Kiko	Marta	Marta	Alejandro	Mariana	Ignacio	Ignacio	Nacho	Ignacio	Nacho	Eliminated (Day 92)			6
Ana	Rubén	Juan	Juan	Juan	Marta	Marta	Alejandro	Anuar	Ignacio	Nacho	Nacho	Ignacio	Eliminated (Day 85)				4
Yulen	Rubén	Kiko	Kiko	Kiko	Kiko	Nacho	Mariana	Nacho; Kiko (x2)	Nacho	Kiko	Nacho	Eliminated (Day 81)					4
Kiko	Rubén	Juan	Anabel	Tania	Anuar	Tania	Tania	Anuar	Mariana	Yulen	Eliminated (Day 74)						21
Mariana	Charo	Alejandro	Ainhoa	Ignacio	Kiko	Kiko	Tania	Anuar	Nacho	Eliminated (Day 67)							12
Anuar	Rubén	Juan	Kiko	Kiko	Kiko	Kiko	Mariana	Mariana	Eliminated (Day 60)								6
Tania	Rubén	Juan	Juan	Juan	Nacho	Kiko	Mariana	Eliminated (Day 53)									6
Desirée	Charo	Charo	Alejandro	Ignacio	Alejandro	Parasite	Re-eliminated (Day 46)										1
Juan	Kiko	Kiko	Anuar	Kiko	Parasite	Left Competition (Day 39)											11
Ainhoa	Ignacio	Charo	Ignacio	Parasite	Eliminated (Day 32)												9
Rubén	Kiko	Parasite		Eliminated (Day 25)													5
Charo	Ainhoa	Ainhoa	Eliminated (Day 18)														6
Nominated by Tribe	Charo; Rubén	Charo; Juan	Alejandro; Kiko	Alejandro; Kiko	Kiko; Marta	Kiko; Marta	Alejandro; Tania	Anuar; Kiko; Mariana	Ignacio; Mariana; Nacho	Ignacio; Kiko; Yulen	Nacho; Yulen	Ana; Ignacio	Nacho	Ignacio			
Nominated by Leader	Ainhoa; Juan	Ainhoa; Kiko	Ainhoa; Juan	Ignacio; Juan	Desy; Nacho	Anabel; Nacho	Anabel; Mariana	Yulen	Kiko	Nacho	Ana; Anabel	Alejandro	Anabel	Nacho			
Nominated	Ainhoa; Charo; Juan; Rubén	Ainhoa; Charo; Juan; Kiko	Ainhoa; Alejandro; Juan; Kiko	Alejandro; Ignacio; Juan; Kiko	Desy; Kiko; Marta; Nacho	Anabel; Kiko; Marta; Nacho	Alejandro; Anabel; Mariana; Tania	Anuar; Kiko; Mariana; Yulen	Ignacio; Kiko; Mariana; Nacho	Ignacio; Kiko; Nacho; Yulen	Ana; Anabel; Nacho; Yulen	Alejandro; Ana; Ignacio	Anabel; Nacho	Ignacio; Nacho	Marta; Nacho	Alejandro; Marta	
Eliminated	Rubén; Fewest votes to save	Charo; Fewest votes to save	Ainhoa; Fewest votes to save	Juan; Fewest votes to save	Desy; Fewest votes (out of 3)	Marta; Fewest votes (out of 3)	Tania; Fewest votes (out of 3)	Anuar; Fewest votes (out of 3)	Mariana; Fewest votes (out of 3)	Kiko; 32,3% (out of 3)	Yulen; Fewest votes (out of 3)	Ana; Fewest votes to save	Anabel; Fewest votes to save	Ignacio; Fewest votes to save	Nacho; 30% to save	Marta; 42,3% to win	
Eliminated	Rubén; Fewest votes to save	Charo; Fewest votes to save	Ainhoa; Fewest votes to save	Juan; Fewest votes to save	Desy; Fewest votes (out of 3)	Marta; Fewest votes (out of 3)	Tania; Fewest votes (out of 3)	Anuar; Fewest votes (out of 3)	Mariana; Fewest votes (out of 3)	Kiko; 32,3% (out of 3)	Yulen; Fewest votes (out of 3)	Ana; Fewest votes to save	Anabel; Fewest votes to save	Ignacio; Fewest votes to save	Nacho; 30% to save	Alejandro; 57,7% to win	
Paradise Island Nominated		Charo; Rubén	Ainhoa; Rubén	Ainhoa; Juan	Desy; Juan	Desy; Marta	Marta; Tania	Anuar; Marta	Mariana; Marta	Kiko; Marta	Marta; Yulen						
Paradise Island Eliminated		Charo; Most votes to eliminate	Rubén; Most votes to eliminate	Ainhoa; Most votes to eliminate	~~Desy~~; Most votes to eliminate	Desy; Most votes to eliminate	Tania; Most votes to eliminate	Anuar; Most votes to eliminate	Mariana; Most votes to eliminate	Kiko; Most votes to eliminate	Yulen; Most votes to eliminate						

== Tribes ==
	Pre-merge tribes		
	Royale	Fatal	Parasite
Week 1	Ana; Anabel; Anuar; Juan; Kiko; Rubén; Tania; Yulen	Ainhoa; Alejandro; Charo; Desy; Ignacio; Mariana; Marta; Nacho	
Week 2	Ainhoa; Alejandro; Charo; Desy; Ignacio; Mariana; Marta; Nacho	Ana; Anabel; Anuar; Juan; Kiko; Tania; Yulen	Rubén
Week 3	Ainhoa; Alejandro; Desy; Ignacio; Mariana; Marta; Nacho	Ana; Anabel; Anuar; Juan; Kiko; Tania; Yulen	Rubén
Week 4	Alejandro; Desy; Ignacio; Mariana; Marta; Nacho	Ana; Anabel; Anuar; Juan; Kiko; Tania; Yulen	Ainhoa
Week 5	Alejandro; Ana; Anabel; Desy; Ignacio; Marta	Anuar; Kiko; Mariana; Nacho; Tania; Yulen	Juan
Week 6	Alejandro; Ana; Anabel; Ignacio; Marta	Anuar; Kiko; Mariana; Nacho; Tania; Yulen	Desy; ~~Juan~~
Week 7	Alejandro; Ana; Anabel; Ignacio	Anuar; Kiko; Mariana; Nacho; Tania; Yulen	Marta
