= Supervivientes: Perdidos en Honduras (2025) =

- Presented by: Jorge Javier Vázquez; Laura Madrueño
- No. of days: 104
- No. of castaways: 21
- Winner: Borja González
- Runner-up: Álvaro Muñoz Escassi
- Location: Cayos Cochinos, Honduras

Release
- Original network: Telecinco
- Original release: 6 March – 17 June 2025

Season chronology
- ← Previous; All Stars Next → All Stars 2

Supervivientes 2025: Perdidos en Honduras is the twentieth season of the show Supervivientes and the twenty-sixth season of Survivor to air in Spain, and the first season since the premiere of Supervivientes: All Stars in summer 2024. It premiered on 6 March 2025.

== Production ==
Following last years production company change, following a disagreement between broadcaster Mediaset España and format rights owners Banijay, Cuarzo, a company affiliate of Banijay, would continue producing the show.

Cayos Cochinos, in Honduras, was confirmed to be the location for the show, as it has been for several years now. Following the same structure as last seasons, Jorge Javier Vázquez returned as the main host from the studio in Madrid, while Laura Madrueño would continue hosting from location in Honduras and Carlos Sobera would continue to host the side shows and Sandra Barneda returns to host the Conexión Honduras debates.

== Cast ==
As usual, the contestants for this series were unveiled across different programmes on Telecinco.

The full list of contestants is as follows:

| Contestant | Occupation | Original tribe | First swap tribe | Second swap tribe | Merged tribe | Finish |
|---|---|---|---|---|---|---|
| Beatriz Rico; 54, Avilés | Actress and television presenter | White | | | | Left competition Day 4 |
| Terelu Campos; 59, Málaga | Television presenter & panelist | Future Ghost | | | | Left competition Day 18 |
| Samya Aghbalou; 26, Tangier, Morocco | MasterChef 12 finalist | Black | | | | 1st voted out Day 25 |
| Rosario Matew; 25, Elche | LIDLT 4 star | White | | | | Left competition Day 25 |
| Ángela Ponce; 34, Pilas | Miss Spain 2018 | White | | | | 2nd voted out Day 32 |
| Gala Caldirola; 32, Altea | Influencer, reality television star | White | | | | 3rd voted out Day 39 |
| Almácor; 27, Villena | Singer | White | White | | | Evacuated; Day 41 |
| Laura Cuevas; 37, Cádiz | Television personality | Black | White | | | 4th voted out Day 53 |
| Koldo Royo; 66, Mallorca | Michelin-starred chef | Black | Black | White | | 5th voted out Day 57 |
| Manuel González; 33, Puerto Real | Reality television star | Mistery Beach | White | White | | 6th voted out Day 64 |
| Nieves Bolós; 31, Barcelona | Fitness Influencer | White | Black | White | | 7th voted out Day 71 |
| Joshua Velázquez; 32, Las Palmas | Fashion designer | Black | Black | White | Magna | 8th voted out Day 78 |
| Carmen Alcayde; 51, Valencia | Journalist & television presenter | White | White | Black | Magna | 9th voted out Day 85 |
| Álex Adrover; 46, Mallorca | Actor | Black | Black | Black | Magna | Evacuated; Day 90 |
| Pelayo Díaz; 38, Oviedo | Fashion blogger and stylist | White | White | White | Magna | 11th voted out Day 92 |
| Makoke Giaever; 55, Málaga | Former Telecupón hostess | Black | White | Black | Magna | 12th voted out Day 95 |
| Damián Quintero; 40, Torremolinos | Olympic karate medallist | White | White | White | Magna | 10th / 13th voted out Day 99 |
| Anita Williams; 27, Barcelona | LIDLT 8 star | Mistery Beach | Black | Black | Magna | 14th voted out Day 104 |
| José Carlos Montoya; 31, Utrera | LIDLT 8 star | Mistery Beach | White | Black | Magna | Third Place; Day 104 |
| Álvaro Muñoz Escassi; 51, Seville | Horse rider and polo player Supervivientes 2009 contestant | Black | Black | Black | Magna | Runner-Up; Day 104 |
| Borja González; 31, Valencia | LIDLT 7 star | Black | Black | Black | Magna | Sole Survivor; Day 104 |

== Nominations ==
| | Week 1 | Week 2 | Week 3 | Week 4 | Week 5 | Week 6 | Week 7 | Week 8 | Week 9 | Week 10 | Week 11 | Week 12 | Week 13 | | Week 14 | | Week 15 | Final | | Total votes |
|---|---|---|---|---|---|---|---|---|---|---|---|---|---|---|---|---|---|---|---|---|
| Borja | Koldo | Laura | Laura | Makoke | Koldo | Laura | Anita | Pelayo | Carmen | Carmen | Joshua | Not eligible | Damián | Anita | Damián | Damián | Nominated | Nominated | Sole Survivor (Day 104) | 2 |
| Álvaro | Koldo | Koldo | Laura | Makoke | Koldo | Koldo | Anita | Makoke | Makoke | Carmen | Joshua | Montoya; Anita | Anita | Montoya | Anita | Anita | Leader | Finalist | Runner-Up (Day 104) | 4 |
| Montoya | Mistery Beach | | Nominated | Gala | Damián | Pelayo | Damián | Álvaro | Makoke | Álvaro | Pelayo | Carmen; Anita | Damián | Pelayo | Makoke | Álvaro | Nominated | Nominated | Third Place (Day 104) | 12 |
| Anita | Not in the game | Mistery Beach | Koldo | Koldo | Laura | Álex | Álvaro | Manuel | Álex | Álex | Pelayo | Not eligible | Damián | Álvaro | Damián | Damián | Nominated | Eliminated (Day 104) | | 12 |
| Damián | Rosario | Ángela | Nominated | Rosario | Gala | Montoya | Carmen | Joshua | Nieves | Nieves | Borja | (2) Montoya | Montoya | Nominated | Borja | Borja | Eliminated (Day 99) | | | 11 |
| Makoke | Koldo | Laura | Laura | Koldo | Mistery Beach | Joshua | Carmen | Joshua | Álvaro | Joshua | Álex | Damián; Borja | Montoya | Montoya | Montoya | Eliminated (Day 95) | | | | 13 |
| Pelayo | Beatriz | Ángela | Nominated | Carmen | Montoya | Carmen | Montoya | Koldo | Joshua | Joshua | Álex | Carmen | Álex | Montoya | Eliminated (Day 92) | | | | | 8 |
| Álex | Samya | Samya | Laura | Makoke | Anita | Laura | Koldo | Montoya | Anita | Carmen | Joshua | Álvaro; Borja | Anita | Evacuated (Day 90) | | | | | | 7 |
| Carmen | Not in the game | | Nominated | Pelayo | Damián | Pelayo | Damián | Parasite | Álex | Álvaro | Pelayo | Damián | Eliminated (Day 85) | | | | | | | 12 |
| Joshua | Samya | Makoke | Koldo | Makoke | Anita | Koldo | Anita | Makoke | Manuel | Makoke | Álex | Eliminated (Day 78) | | | | | | | | 7 |
| Nieves | Almácor | Damián | Nominated | Mistery Beach | | Almácor | Álvaro | Manuel | Manuel | Makoke | Eliminated (Day 71) | | | | | | | | | 3 |
| Manuel | Not in the game | Mistery Beach | | | | Montoya | Carmen | Nieves | Nieves | Eliminated (Day 64) | | | | | | | | | | 3 |
| Koldo | Samya | Samya | Makoke | Makoke | Anita | Laura | Anita | Montoya | Eliminated (Day 57) | | | | | | | | | | | 10 |
| Laura | Samya | Samya | Borja | Álex | Anita | Borja | Parasite | Eliminated (Day 53) | | | | | | | | | | | | 10 |
| Almácor | Beatriz | Ángela | Nominated | Carmen | Gala | Carmen | Evacuated (Day 41) | | | | | | | | | | | | | 7 |
| Gala | Beatriz | Almácor | Nominated | Carmen | Almácor | Carmen | Eliminated (Day 39) | | | | | | | | | | | | | 4 |
| Ángela | Beatriz | Almácor | Nominated | Mistery Beach | Eliminated (Day 32) | | | | | | | | | | | | | | | 3 |
| Rosario | Beatriz | Almácor | Nominated | Almácor | Left Competition (Day 25) | | | | | | | | | | | | | | | 0 |
| Samya | Laura | Koldo | Mistery Beach | Eliminated (Day 25) | | | | | | | | | | | | | | | | 7 |
| Terelu | Future Ghost | | | Left Competition (Day 18) | | | | | | | Guest (Day 71-83) | | Left Competition (Day 18) | | | | | | | 0 |
| Beatriz | Gala | Left Competition (Day 4) | | | | | | | | | | | | | | | | | | 5 |
| Notes | 1, 2 | 3, 4, 5, 6 | 7, 8 | 9 | 10 | 11 | none | 13, 14, 15 | 16 | 17 | 18 | 19, 20 | none | 21, 22 | 23 | | | | | |
| Nominated by Tribe | Beatriz; Samya | Almácor; Samya | Laura | Carmen; Makoke | Anita; Gala | Carmen; Laura | Anita; Carmen | Koldo; Makoke | Álex; Manuel | Carmen; Joshua | Álex; Joshua; Pelayo | Anita; Montoya | Anita; Damián; Montoya | Álvaro; Montoya; Pelayo | Borja; Damián; Makoke; Montoya | Anita; Borja; Damián | | | | |
| Nominated by Leader | Rosario; Koldo | Damián; Laura | Koldo | Koldo; Rosario | Koldo; Montoya | Álex; Montoya | Koldo; Montoya | Joshua; Manuel | Joshua; Makoke | Álvaro; Nieves | Borja | Carmen | Álex | Anita | Anita | Álvaro | | | | |
| Nominated | ~~Beatriz~~; Koldo; Rosario; Samya | Almácor; Damián; Laura; Samya | Almácor; Ángela; Carmen; Damián; Gala; Koldo; Laura; Montoya; Nieves; Pelayo; Rosario | Carmen; Koldo; Makoke; ~~Rosario~~ | Anita; Gala; Koldo; Montoya | Álex; Carmen; Laura; Montoya | Anita; Carmen; Koldo; Montoya | Joshua; Koldo; Makoke; Manuel | Álex; Joshua; Makoke; Manuel | Álvaro; Carmen; Joshua; Nieves | Álex; Borja; Joshua; Pelayo | Anita; Carmen; Montoya | Álex; Anita; Damián; Montoya | Álvaro; Anita; Damián; Montoya; Pelayo | Anita; Borja; Damián; Makoke; Montoya | Álvaro; Anita; Borja; Damián | Anita; Borja; Montoya | Borja; Montoya | Álvaro; Borja | |
| Eliminated | Elimination cancelled | Samya; Fewest votes (out of 2) | Nieves; Fewest votes (out of 8) | Makoke; 46% (out of 2) | Gala; Fewest votes (out of 2) | Laura; Fewest votes (out of 2) | Carmen; 49% (out of 2) | Koldo; Fewest votes (out of 2) | Manuel; 49.6% (out of 2) | Nieves; Fewest votes (out of 2) | Joshua; Fewest votes (out of 3) | Carmen; 48.2% (out of 2) | Damián; Fewest votes (out of 2) | Pelayo; Fewest votes (out of 3) | Makoke; 7% to save | Damián; Fewest votes (out of 3) | Anita; 20% to save | Montoya; Fewest votes to save | Álvaro; 34% to win | |
| Eliminated | Elimination cancelled | Samya; Fewest votes (out of 2) | Ángela; Fewest votes (out of 3) | Makoke; 46% (out of 2) | Gala; Fewest votes (out of 2) | Laura; Fewest votes (out of 2) | Carmen; 49% (out of 2) | Koldo; Fewest votes (out of 2) | Manuel; 49.6% (out of 2) | Nieves; Fewest votes (out of 2) | Joshua; Fewest votes (out of 3) | Carmen; 48.2% (out of 2) | Damián; Fewest votes (out of 2) | Pelayo; Fewest votes (out of 3) | Makoke; 7% to save | Damián; Fewest votes (out of 3) | Anita; 20% to save | Montoya; Fewest votes to save | Borja; 66% to win | |
| Mistery Beach / Parasite Zone Leader | | none | Nieves | Nieves | Makoke | | none | | | | | | | | | | | | | |
| Mistery Beach / Parasite Zone Nominated | | Anita; Manuel; Montoya | Ángela; Manuel; Samya | Ángela; Makoke; Manuel | Gala; Manuel; Nieves | | Carmen; Laura | | | | | | | | | | | | | |
| Mistery Beach / Parasite Zone Eliminated | | Montoya; Most votes to transfer (out of 3) | Samya; Fewest votes (out of 2) | Ángela; Fewest votes (out of 2) | Gala; Fewest votes (out of 2) | | Laura; Fewest votes (out of 2) | | | | | | | | | | | | | |
| Mistery Beach / Parasite Zone Eliminated | | Anita; Most votes to transfer (out of 2) | Samya; Fewest votes (out of 2) | Ángela; Fewest votes (out of 2) | Gala; Fewest votes (out of 2) | | Laura; Fewest votes (out of 2) | | | | | | | | | | | | | |

- Contestant was leader and whoever they nominated would automatically face elimination (Immune).
- Contestant was nominated.

Notes

- ^Note 1: Terelu entered to the competition as a guest playing the role of Future Ghost. She will be able to stay at the competition if she beats her sister Carmen Borrego who stayed in the island for 22 days last season. In the meantime, she will be exempt from nominations.
- ^Note 2: Montoya entered as a new contestant on Day 4, while Anita and Manuel entered as new contestants on Day 8, staying all of them at the Mystery Beach.
- ^Note 3: Due to the withdrawal of Beatriz Rico, who was nominated, the elimination was cancelled.
- ^Note 4: There was a tie at Furia Beach between Almácor and Ángela. Nieves as leader had to break it nominating Almácor.
- ^Note 5: Carmen enters as a new contestant on Day 11, replacing Beatriz.
- ^Note 6: Anita, Manuel, and Montoya, members of Mistery Beach, undergo a nomination process, during which the saved members, Montoya and Anita, move to the other beaches with the rest of their teammates. But Manuel, receiving the fewest votes, continues living on Mistery Beach.
- ^Note 7: All the members of Furia tribe were automatically nominated as they were found using a lighter to make fire.
- ^Note 8: Mystery Beach eliminations took place on Sunday Debates rather in the main Gala.
- ^Note 9: Rosario decided to withdraw from the competition on Day 25.
- ^Note 10: There was a tie between Damián and Gala, Pelayo as leader decided to nominate Gala.
- ^Note 11: In this week, the Limbo Beach contestants can nominate another contestants from any other Beach.
- ^Note 13: This week, each contestant have to nominate a contestant from the opposite tribe.
- ^Note 14: There was a tie among Álvaro, Joshua, Koldo and Nieves, Damián as leader decided to nominate Koldo.
- ^Note 15: There was a tie between Makoke and Montoya, Anita as leader decided to nominate Makoke.
- ^Note 16: There was a tie between Manuel and Nieves, Pelayo as leader decided to nominate Manuel.
- ^Note 17: There was a tie between Joshua and Makoke, Damián as leader decided to nominate Joshua.
- ^Note 18: The two tribes merged into Magna tribe.
- ^Note 19: This week, there was a wheel of the fortune which determined the way of nominating. Álex, Makoke and Montoya nominated in positive for two contestants; Álvaro nominated with one point for two contestants; Borja and Anita were not able to nominate; Carmen nominated as usual with one point to a contestants; Damián had to nominate for a contestant with two points.
- ^Note 20: There was a tie between Álex, Anita, Damián and Makoke, Pelayo as leader decided to nominate Anita.
- ^Note 21: Due to Alex's evacuation because of an injury, Damián was allowed to return to the competition to replace Alex as he was the last eliminated contestant.
- ^Note 22: Damián was automatically nominated as this was the condition to return to competition as he was previously eliminated.
- ^Note 23: Although there was a tie among three contestants, the rules changed and It wasn't necessary to break the tie.

== Tribes ==
| | Pre-merge tribes | | |
|---|---|---|---|
| | Calme Beach | Furia Beach | Mistery Beach |
| Week 1 | Ángela; Almácor; ~~Beatriz~~; Damián; Gala; Nieves; Pelayo; Rosario; Terelu | Álex; Álvaro; Borja; Joshua; Koldo; Laura; Makoke; Samya | Montoya |
| Week 2 | Álex; Álvaro; Borja; Joshua; Koldo; Laura; Makoke; Samya | Ángela; Almácor; Carmen; Damián; Gala; Nieves; Pelayo; Rosario | Anita; Manuel; Montoya; Terelu |
| Week 3 | Álex; Álvaro; Anita; Borja; Joshua; Koldo; Laura; Makoke | Ángela; Almácor; Carmen; Damián; Gala; Montoya; Nieves; Pelayo; Rosario | Manuel; Samya |
| Week 4 | Álex; Álvaro; Anita; Borja; Joshua; Koldo; Laura; Makoke | Almácor; Carmen; Damián; Gala; Montoya; Pelayo; ~~Rosario~~ | Ángela; Manuel; Nieves |
| Week 5 | Álex; Álvaro; Anita; Borja; Joshua; Koldo; Laura | Almácor; Carmen; Damián; Gala; Montoya; Pelayo | Makoke; Manuel; Nieves |
| Week 6 | ~~Almácor~~; Carmen; Damián; Montoya; Pelayo | Álex; Álvaro; Anita; Borja; Joshua; Koldo; Laura | Makoke; Manuel; Nieves |
| | Calme Beach | Furia Beach | Parasite |
| Week 7 | Álex; Álvaro; Anita; Borja; Joshua; Koldo; Nieves | Carmen; Damián; Makoke; Manuel; Montoya; Pelayo | Laura |
| Week 8 | Álex; Álvaro; Anita; Borja; Joshua; Koldo; Nieves | Damián; Makoke; Manuel; Montoya; Pelayo | Carmen; Laura |
| Week 9 | Damián; Joshua; Manuel; Nieves; Pelayo | Álex; Álvaro; Anita; Borja; Carmen; Makoke; Montoya | |
| Week 10 | Damián; Joshua; Makoke; Nieves; Pelayo | Álex; Álvaro; Anita; Borja; Carmen; Montoya | |

== Blind results ==
| Week | 1stPlace to save | 2ndPlace to save | 3rdPlace to save | 4thPlace to save | 5thPlace to save | 6thPlace to save |
|---|---|---|---|---|---|---|
| 1 | 57% | 23% | 12% | 8% | | |
| 1 | 54% | 37% | 9% | | | |
| 2 | 39% | 30% | 17% | 14% | | |
| 3 | Not Shown | | | | | |
| 4 | 41% | 29% | 17% | 13% | | |
| 5 | 39% | 35% | 20% | 6% | | |
| 5 | 60% | 31% | 9% | | | |
| 6 | 59% | 24% | 13% | 4% | | |
| 6 | 49% | 43% | 8% | | | |
| 7 | 33% | 29% | 29% | 9% | | |
| 7 | 42% | 37% | 21% | | | |
| 7 | 57% | 43% | | | | |
| 7 | 54% | 46% | | | | |
| 7 | 52% | 48% | | | | |
| 7 | 51% | 49% | | | | |
| 8 | 40% | 32% | 28% | | | |
| 9 | 33% | 29% | 22% | 16% | | |
| 9 | 55% | 45% | | | | |
| 9 | 52% | 48% | | | | |
| 9 | 50.2% | 49.8% | | | | |
| 9 | 50.2% | 49.8% | | | | |
| 9 | 50.6% | 49.4% | | | | |
| 10 | 37% | 31% | 20% | 12% | | |
| 10 | 47% | 33% | 20% | | | |
| 11 | 65% | 16% | 12% | 7% | | |
| 11 | 47% | 29% | 24% | | | |
| 12 | 46% | 31% | 23% | | | |
| 12 | 41.60% | 29.25% | 29.15% | | | |
| 12 | 41.53% | 29.26% | 29.21% | | | |
| 12 | 41.40% | 29.38% | 29.22% | | | |
| 12 | 50.4% | 49.6% | | | | |
| 12 | 50.6% | 49.4% | | | | |
| 12 | 50.7% | 49.3% | | | | |
| 12 | 50.8% | 49.2% | | | | |
| 12 | 50.9% | 49.1% | | | | |
| 12 | 51.1% | 48.9% | | | | |
| 12 | 51.3% | 48.7% | | | | |
| 12 | 51.6% | 48.4% | | | | |
| 12 | 51.8% | 48.2% | | | | |
| 13.1 | 32.4% | 23.9% | 22.4% | 21.3% | | |
| 13.1 | 31.4% | 23.9% | 23.5% | 21.1% | | |
| 13.1 | 31.2% | 23.8% | 23.7% | 21.3% | | |
| 13.1 | 31.1% | 24.0% | 23.7% | 21.2% | | |
| 13.1 | 37.6% | 32.8% | 29.6% | | | |
| 13.1 | 42.5% | 29.8% | 27.7% | | | |
| 13.1 | 57.2% | 42.8% | | | | |
| 13.2 | 34% | 26% | 18% | 13% | 9% | |
| 13.2 | 42% | 25% | 19% | 14% | | |
| 13.2 | 43% | 30% | 27% | | | |
| 13.2 | 43% | 31% | 26% | | | |
| 14.1 | 31% | 29% | 21% | 12% | 7% | |
| 14.1 | 30% | 29% | 21% | 12% | 8% | |
| 14.1 | 30% | 30% | 21% | 12% | 7% | |
| 14.2 | 45% | 28% | 15% | 12% | | |
| 15.1 | 56% | 24% | 20% | | | |
| 15.2 | 63% | 37% | | | | |

=== Definitive eliminations ===
| Week | 1stPlace to save | 2ndPlace to save | 3rdPlace to save |
|---|---|---|---|
| 4 | 65% | 27% | 8% |
| 4 | 64% | 28% | 8% |
| 5 | 57% | 28% | 15% |
| 5 | 56% | 28% | 16% |
| 6 | 67% | 27% | 6% |

== Ratings ==
=== "Galas" ===
| Show N° | Day | Viewers | Ratings share |
|---|---|---|---|
| 1 - Launch | Thursday, March 6 | 1.477.000 | 22.7% |
| 2 | Thursday, March 13 | 1.513.000 | 20.6% |
| 3 | Thursday, March 20 | 1.587.000 | 23.3% |
| 4 | Thursday, March 27 | 1.446.000 | 22.2% |
| 5 | Thursday, April 3 | 1.647.000 | 23.5% |
| 6 | Thursday, April 10 | 1.497.000 | 23.1% |
| 7 | Thursday, April 17 | 1.434.000 | 20.7% |
| 8 | Thursday, April 24 | 1.523.000 | 22.9% |
| 9 | Thursday, May 1 | 1.360.000 | 19.3% |
| 10 | Thursday, May 8 | 1.430.000 | 20.3% |
| 11 | Thursday, May 15 | 1.382.000 | 20% |
| 12 | Thursday, May 22 | 1.301.000 | 19.8% |
| 13 | Thursday, May 29 | 1.432.000 | 21.5% |
| 14 | Thursday, June 5 | 1.405.000 | 20.7% |
| 15 | Thursday, June 12 | 1.402.000 | 21% |
| 16 - Finale | Tuesday, June 17 | 1.734.000 | 25.9% |

=== "Conexión Honduras" ===
| Show N° | Day | Viewers | Ratings share |
|---|---|---|---|
| 1 | Sunday, March 9 | 1.683.000 | 19.6% |
| 2 | Sunday, March 16 | 1.263.000 | 18.4% |
| 3 | Sunday, March 23 | 1.359.000 | 20.2% |
| 4 | Sunday, March 30 | 1.557.000 | 18.1% |
| 5 | Sunday, April 6 | 1.572.000 | 18.5% |
| 6 | Sunday, April 13 | 1.454.000 | 17.6% |
| 7 | Sunday, April 20 | 1.347.000 | 15.9% |
| 8 | Sunday, April 27 | 1.402.000 | 16.4% |
| 9 | Sunday, May 4 | 1.420.000 | 16.9% |
| 10 | Sunday, May 11 | 1.321.000 | 15.1% |
| 11 | Sunday, May 18 | 1.291.000 | 15.5% |
| 12 | Sunday, May 25 | 1.275.000 | 15.9% |
| 13 | Sunday, June 1 | 1.434.000 | 17.9% |
| 14 | Sunday, June 8 | 1.240.000 | 14% |
| 15 | Sunday, June 15 | 1.283.000 | 20.6% |

=== "Tierra De Nadie" ===
| Show N° | Day | Viewers | Ratings share |
|---|---|---|---|
| 1 | Tuesday, March 11 | 1.337.000 | 21.1% |
| 2 | Tuesday, March 18 | 1.380.000 | 20.8% |
| 3 | Tuesday, March 25 | 1.379.000 | 22% |
| 4 | Tuesday, April 1 | 1.307.000 | 18.5% |
| 5 | Tuesday, April 8 | 1.317.000 | 19.4% |
| 6 | Tuesday, April 15 | 1.471.000 | 20.7% |
| 7 | Tuesday, April 22 | 1.391.000 | 20.7% |
| 8 | Tuesday, April 29 | 1.297.000 | 20.1% |
| 9 | Tuesday, May 6 | 1.306.000 | 18.5% |
| 10 | Tuesday, May 13 | 1.294.000 | 19.3% |
| 11 | Tuesday, May 13 | 1.239.000 | 19.3% |
| 12 | Tuesday, May 27 | 1.351.000 | 20.8% |
| 13 | Tuesday, June 3 | 1.394.000 | 21.1% |
| 14 | Tuesday, June 10 | 1.321.000 | 20.8% |
