= Odette Vans =

Spanish influencer (born 1995)

Odette Vans (b. Odette Tomicic, Croatia, July 27, 1995), is a transgender Spanish influencer and television personality who rose to fame in 2019 for competing in the reality show Supervivientes.

== Early years ==
Odette Vans was born in Croatia on July 27, 1995. She is the oldest of 5 siblings. At the age of 5, Vans moved with her family to Vitoria, after Croatian social services tried to take custody from her parents due to their alleged drug problems.

== Career ==
At the age of 16, Vans created her own YouTube channel which was dedicated to makeup tutorials.

In 2018, she appeared as a guest on the talk show Viajando con Chester, hosted by Risto Mejide. A year later, in 2019, she rose to fame after competing in the Spanish reality show Supervivientes, in which she was the sixth contestant to be eliminated.

In October 2023, Vans starred in the advertising campaign "Be Yourself" from the beauty product brand Essence, which was shown on the streets of Madrid, Barcelona, Valencia, Seville, Malaga, and Bilbao between October and November of that same year.

On February 21, 2024, Vans came out through social networks as a trans woman, and announced the launch of her documentary video podcast Siempre fui Odette, in which she narrates her entire life from her early childhood, as well as her gender transition.

== Filmography ==
=== Television ===
Año	Título	Papel	Notas
2017	Snacks de tele	Herself	2 episodes
2018	Viajando con Chester	Herself	1 episode
2019	Supervivientes	Contestant	6th Eliminated
2024	Siempre fui Odette	Herself	3 episodes

=== Podcasts ===
Año	Título	Papel	Notas
2018	Las Uñas	Guest	1 episode
2022	Animales Humanos	Guest	1 episode
2023	Special People Club	Guest	1 episode
