= Supervivientes: Perdidos en Honduras (2008) =

- Presented by: Jesús Vázquez
- No. of days: 71
- No. of castaways: 13
- Winner: Miriam Sánchez
- Runner-up: Leo Segarra
- Location: Cayos Cochinos, Honduras
- No. of episodes: 11

Release
- Original network: Telecinco
- Original release: January 17 – March 27, 2008

Season chronology
- ← Previous; 2007 Next → 2009

Supervivientes 2008: Perdidos en Honduras is the fifth season of the show Supervivientes and the ninth season of Survivor to air in Spain. It was broadcast on Telecinco from January 17, 2008 to March 27, 2008. This season took place in Honduras. The show was presented by Jesús Vázquez, with Mario Picazo and Emma García acting as hosts of side programs.

== Season summary ==
For this season the show temporarily returned to its original format by dividing the contestants into two tribes, white and black, which eventually merged. Due to a tropical disease and no sign of recovery, in week three of this season it was decided that Mario Picazo would leave his role as presenter to recover and would be replaced by Oscar Martinez during that time. Ultimately, it was Miriam Sánchez who won this season over Leo Segarra and Lely Céspedes, taking home €200,000 and a car.

== Finishing order ==
Contestant	Famous For	Original tribe	Merged tribe	Finish
Estela Giménez; 28, Madrid	Olympic rhythmic gymnast	White	None	Left Competition; Day 5
Miguel Such; 31, Palma	Television host and actor	Black	None	1st Voted Out; Day 7
Joselito; 64, Jaén	Child star singer	Black	Merge Team	2nd Voted Out; Day 14
Ivonne Armant; 34, Mexico	Plácido Domingo granddaughter	Black	Merge Team	3rd Voted Out; Day 21
Felisa Gómez; 26, Venezuela	Model	White	Merge Team	4th Voted Out; Day 28
Ojani Noa; 33, Havana	Jennifer Lopez's ex-husband	Black	Merge Team	5th Voted Out; Day 35
Karmele Marchante; 61, Tarragona	Journalist and television panelist	White	Merge Team	6th Voted Out; Day 42
Patxi Salinas; 44, Biscay	Former pro footballer	Black	Merge Team	7th Voted Out; Day 49
Michel Olivares; 28, Murcia	Model	White	Merge Team	8th Voted Out; Day 56
Nekal Haidari; 21, Iran	Basketballer	White	Merge Team	9th Voted Out; Day 63
Lely Céspedes; 37, Málaga	Ernesto Neyra's ex-wife	Black	Merge Team	Third Place; Day 70
Leo Segarra; 28, Valencia	Singer, Operación Triunfo 5 finalist	Black	Merge Team	Runner-Up; Day 70
Miriam Sánchez; 26, Madrid	Former adult performer	White	Merge Team	Sole Survivor; Day 70

== Nominations table ==
	Week 1	Week 2	Week 3	Week 4	Week 5	Week 6	Week 7	Week 8	Week 9	Final	Total votes
Miriam	No nominations	Patxi	Felisa	Ojani	Ojani	Lely	Patxi	Leo	Nominated	Sole Survivor (Day 70)	9
Leo	No nominations	Felisa	Felisa	Felisa	Nekal	Miriam	Miriam	Michel	Nominated	Runner-Up (Day 70)	0
Lely	No nominations	José	Nekal	Karmele	Patxi	Miriam	Miriam	Michel	Finalist	Third Place (Day 70)	9
Nekal	No nominations	Ivonne	Michel	Karmele	Karmele	Lely	Patxi	Lely	Nominated	Eliminated (Day 63)	5
Michel	No nominations	Patxi	Nekal	Karmele	Nekal	Karmele	Leo	Lely	Eliminated (Day 56)		4
Patxi	No nominations	Karmele	Felisa	Karmele	Karmele	Karmele	Miriam	Michel	Eliminated (Day 49)		9
Karmele	Nominated	Patxi	Ivonne	Lely	Patxi	Lely	Patxi	Eliminated (Day 42)			9
Ojani	No nominations	José	Miriam	Karmele	Nekal	Miriam	Eliminated (Day 35)				1
Felisa	No nominations	Patxi	Miriam	Lely	Lely	Eliminated (Day 28)					4
Ivonne	No nominations	José	Miriam	Lely	Eliminated (Day 21)						3
José	No nominations	Ivonne	Felisa	Eliminated (Day 14)							2
Miguel	Nominated	Ivonne	Eliminated (Day 7)								0
Estela	No nominations	Left Competition (Day 5)									0
Nomination Notes	See note 1	See note 2	See note 3	See note 4	See note 5	See note 6, See note 7	See note 8, See note 9	See note 10	See note 11	None	
Nominated by Tribe		Patxi	Felisa	Karmele	Nekal	Miriam	Patxi	Michel			
Nominated by Leader		José	Ivonne	Felisa	Ojani	Karmele	Leo	Leo			
Nominated	Karmele	José; Patxi	Felisa; Ivonne	Felisa; Karmele	Nekal; Ojani	Karmele; Miriam	Leo; Patxi	Leo; Michel	Leo; Miriam; Nekal	Lely; Leo; Miriam	
Nominated	Miguel	José; Patxi	Felisa; Ivonne	Felisa; Karmele	Nekal; Ojani	Karmele; Miriam	Leo; Patxi	Leo; Michel	Leo; Miriam; Nekal	Lely; Leo; Miriam	
Eliminated	Miguel; 52% to eliminate	José; 50.8% to eliminate	Ivonne; 50.4% to eliminate	Felisa; 56% to eliminate	Ojani; 79% to eliminate	Karmele; 82% to eliminate	Patxi; 58% to eliminate	Michel; 52.7% to eliminate	Nekal; 10.4% to save	Lely; 23.4% (Out of 3)	
Eliminated	Miguel; 52% to eliminate	José; 50.8% to eliminate	Ivonne; 50.4% to eliminate	Felisa; 56% to eliminate	Ojani; 79% to eliminate	Karmele; 82% to eliminate	Patxi; 58% to eliminate	Michel; 52.7% to eliminate	Nekal; 10.4% to save	Leo; 32.4% to win	
Eliminated	Miguel; 52% to eliminate	José; 50.8% to eliminate	Ivonne; 50.4% to eliminate	Felisa; 56% to eliminate	Ojani; 79% to eliminate	Karmele; 82% to eliminate	Patxi; 58% to eliminate	Michel; 52.7% to eliminate	Nekal; 10.4% to save	Miriam; 67.6% to win	

- ^Note 1: In week one, the contestants were split into two tribes and nominated separately as groups.
- ^Note 2: As the winner of the immunity challenge, Lely was given the power to name a nominee.
- ^Note 3: As the winner of the immunity challenge, Karmele was given the power to name a nominee..
- ^Note 4: As the winner of the immunity challenge, Leo was given the power to name a nominee..
- ^Note 5: As the winner of the immunity challenge, Miriam was given the power to name a nominee.
- ^Note 6: As the winner of the immunity challenge, Patxi was given the power to name a nominee.
- ^Note 7: There was a tie between Miriam and Lely and Patxi, as leader, broke it nominating Miriam.
- ^Note 8: As the winner of the immunity challenge, Michel was given the power to name a nominee.
- ^Note 9: There was a tie between Miriam and Patxi and Michel, as leader, broke it nominating Patxi.
- ^Note 10: As the winner of the immunity challenge, Miriam was given the power to name a nominee.
- ^Note 11: As they lost the final immunity challenge, Nekal, Leo, and Miriam were automatically nominated for elimination.
