= Arkano =

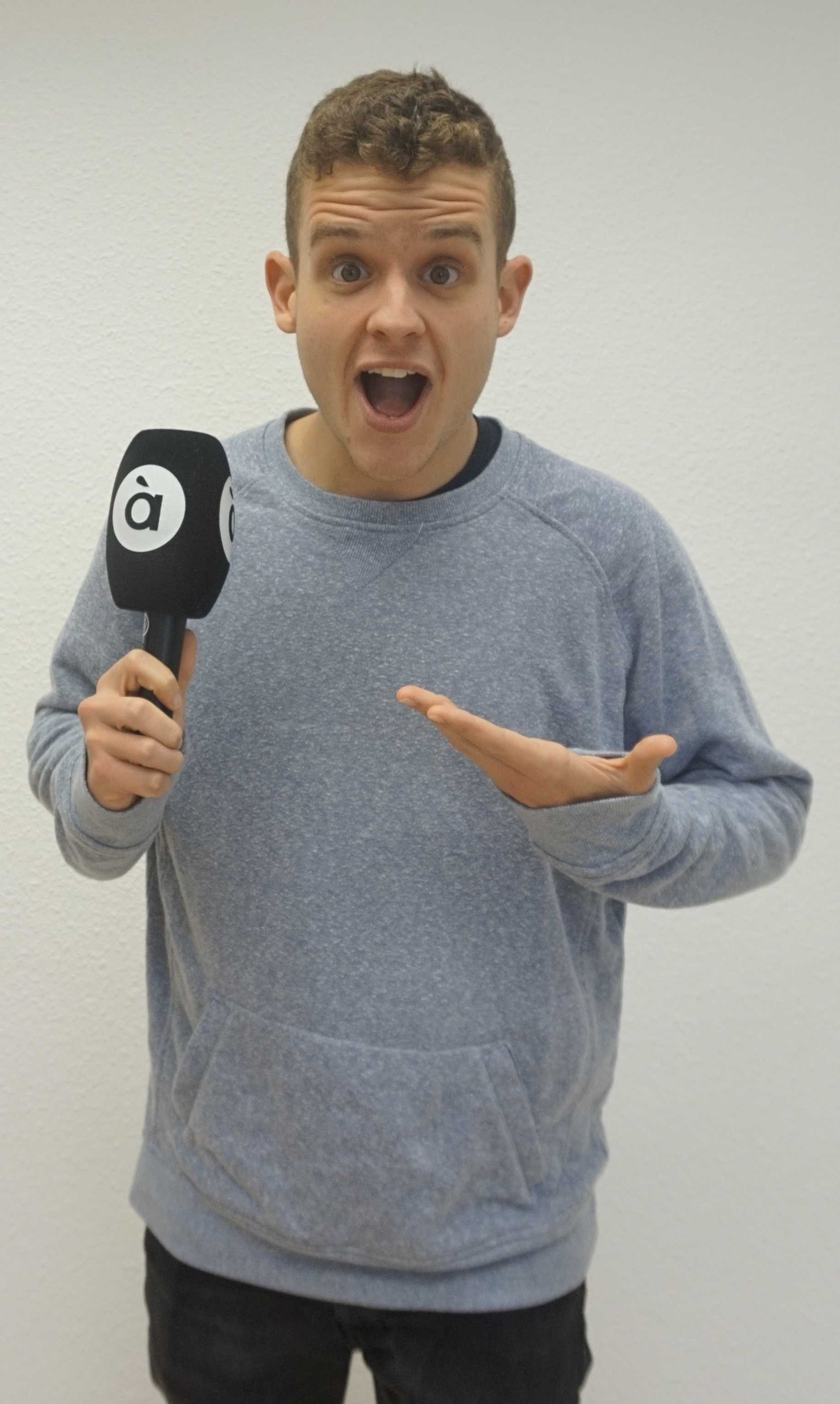
- Arkano in 2018

Background information
- Also known as: Arkano
- Born: Guillermo Rodríguez Godínez; March 23, 1994 (age 32); Alicante, Spain
- Genre: Freestyle rap
- Occupation: Rapper
- Instrument: Voice

Guillermo Rodríguez Godínez, better known as Arkano (born March 23, 1994), is a Spanish freestyle musician and rapper. He became the 2015 Red Bull Batalla de los Gallos International Champion. He has collaborated with artists such as Alejandro Sanz, Rosana, Love of Lesbian and Café Quijano.

== Biography ==
Born in the La Colmena building in the neighborhood of San Blas in Alicante, he began to take his first steps in rap in this city. At just seven years old, he discovered the world of hip hop thanks to his sister, listening to groups like ZNP, Violadores del Verso, and artists like Nach and El Chojin. The first "battle" —a face-off between rappers— where he made himself known took place in July 2008; from that moment on, he began to participate in other competitions.

Since 2009, he's known in the Spanish national scene because he won the national title of Red Bull Batalla de Gallos at just fifteen years old, facing "roosters" like Skone, Jonko, and Mowlihawk. By the end of the year, he was also the runner-up in Hipnotik. He also participated in the Red Bull International Final held in his country, where he was eliminated in the quarterfinals against Rayden.

In 2015, he regained the national champion title of battle of roosters in his city, Alicante, after defeating Cixer, Elekipo, Blon, and Ante. In the same year, he achieved his greatest milestone to date, being crowned as the world champion of Red Bull Batallas de los Gallos in Chile. One of the most controversial moments took place in his confrontation against Dtoke, in the quarterfinals. While Dtoke was rapping, Arkano kissed him. After advancing to the next round, in the semifinals, he had a great confrontation against one of the best MCs in history, Aczino, whom he managed to defeat after two replicas, to finally crown himself champion against the Chilean MC Tom Crowley. In 2016, in Peru, he was controversially eliminated in the semifinals of this competition against Skone, who eventually became the champion, and he managed to qualify for the following year's edition by achieving third place. He also broke the 'curse' that when an MC won the international final, if they presented themselves the following year, they would lose in the first round.

In October 2016, he broke a Guinness World Record after improvising for 24 hours 34 minutes 27 seconds, with pauses of only three seconds to eat and drink, in the Puerta del Sol in Madrid.

In 2017, he participated in the international final, being invited to it after achieving third place in the international final of 2016. In the international final, held in Mexico on December 3, 2017, he again qualified for the next edition by achieving third place, after losing in a very close match with Aczino in the semifinals and winning in the consolation final against the Dominican Yenky One. He also performed during the 22nd Forqué Awards.

In his role as an author, he published a book in 2016 —Asalto al vacío: cómo he llegado hasta aquí—, and finally, in 2017, his first studio album, Bioluminiscencia, was released. In 2017, he completed his degree in Computer Engineering.

Arkano has a relatively frequent presence in the media in Spain, having become a reference in rap and specifically in freestyle.

He participated in the FMS (Freestyle Master Series) in which last season 2017-2018 he managed to stay in the league to not be relegated, in which Invert and Mr.Ego were relegated during the first day, finishing ninth and tenth respectively.

In 2018, he again competed in the Red Bull Batalla de los Gallos, this time in Argentina, where, after defeating local Dozer in the round of 16, he was defeated by his compatriot Bnet in the quarterfinals. This marked his farewell, after 5 internationals, from the main competition of the roosters.

His retirement from battles was in his final battle against Chuty, in the ninth round of FMS España that took place in Valencia on February 16, 2019. Although he has not lost contact with battles, participating as a judge in many freestyle competitions, such as the National Final of the Red Bull Batalla de los Gallos of 2019.

In 2019, his song "Otro intento más" became the first rap to be the official theme of the Vuelta a España.

In November 2019, he participated, playing himself as one of the "kidnapped" in El gran secuestro for Playz.

On November 30, 2019, he participated as a judge in the international edition of the Red Bull Batalla de los Gallos 2019. Arkano is a collaborator on the radio program La Ventana on the Cadena SER.

== Personal life ==
Arkano is openly bisexual, indicating his sexual orientation for the first time in October 2021 during his participation in MasterChef Celebrity.

== Competition statistics ==
Freestyle battles
Year	Competition	Place	Rival	Ranked
2009	Red Bull Batalla de Gallos Regional	Alicante, Spain	vs. (Spain) Tase	3rd place
2009	Hipnotik MC Battle	Barcelona, Spain	vs. (Ecuador) Giorgio	Runner-up
2009	Red Bull Batalla de Los Gallos Nacional	Madrid, Spain	vs. (Spain) Mowlihawk	Champion
2009	Red Bull Batalla de Gallos Internacional	Madrid, Spain	vs. (Spain) Rayden	Quarter-finals
2014	Red Bull Batalla de Los Gallos Regional	Madrid, Spain	vs. (Spain) Cixer	Champion
2014	Red Bull Batalla de Los Gallos Nacional	Cádiz, Spain	vs. (Spain) Dani	Quarter-finals
2014	Hipnotik MC Battle	Barcelona, Spain	vs. (Spain) Elekipo	Semifinalist
2014	Arenal Sound	Barcelona, Spain	vs. (Spain) Errecé	Champion
2015	Red Bull Batalla de Los Gallos Regional	Mallorca, Spain	vs. (Spain) Barón	Champion
2015	Red Bull Batalla de Los Gallos Nacional	Alicante, Spain	vs. (Spain) Ante	Champion
2015	Supremacía MC Internacional	Lima, Peru	vs. (Chile) Káiser	Semifinalist
2015	MEID IN SPAIN (General Rap Granada)	Granada, Spain	vs. (Spain) Skone	Champion
2015	Cannamed	Valencia, Spain	vs. (Spain) Errecé	Champion
2015	Red Bull Batalla de Gallos Internacional	Santiago, Chile	vs. (Chile) Tom Crowley	Champion
2016	God Level Fest	Santiago, Chile	vs. (Chile) Káiser	Quarter-finals
2016	Radio EPS	Alicante, Spain	vs. (Spain) Chuty	Exhibition
2016	Red Bull Batalla de Gallos Internacional	Lima, Peru	vs. (Mexico) Jony Beltrán	3rd place
2017	BDM España Regional	Murcia, Spain	vs. (Spain) Piezas	Exhibition
2017	Ego Fest	Buenos Aires, Argentina	vs. (Argentina) Wos	Exhibition
2017	Red Bull Batalla de Gallos Internacional	Mexico City, Mexico	vs. (Dominican Republic) Yenky One	3rd place
2018	Freestyle Master Series Nacional	Spain	vs. (Spain) Blon	7th place
2018	Red Bull Batalla de Gallos Internacional	Buenos Aires, Argentina	vs. (Spain) Bnet	Quarter-finals
2019	Freestyle Master Series Nacional	Spain	vs. (Spain) Chuty	6th place
2019	RÉPLICA	Madrid, Spain	vs. (Spain) Invert	Exhibition
2022	Red Bull Batalla	Mexico City, Mexico	vs. (Mexico) Aczino	Exhibition
2023	Red Bull Batalla de Los Gallos Regional	Barcelona, Spain	vs. (Spain) Zoyert	Quarter-finals
2023	Red Bull Batalla de Los Gallos (Última Plaza)	Madrid, Spain	vs. (Spain) Le33	Semifinalist
Written battles
2015	Vandal Fest	Lima, Peru	vs. (Peru) Flecha	-
2015	COLISEVM Battle	Mexico City, Mexico	vs. (Mexico) Aczino	-

== Discography ==
=== With Jonko ===
- Clase preferente (demo, 2010)
- La voz de la sospecha (demo, 2013, Tiamat Records)

=== With Melendi y Alejandro Sanz ===
- Déjala que baile (2018)

=== With La La Love You y Suu ===
- Quédate conmigo (2020)
- Zino

=== Solo ===
- Hoy puede ser un gran día (demo, 2011)
- Rareza antropológica (demo, 2012)
- Smooth Series (EP, 2014, Tiamat Records)
- Bioluminiscencia (LP, 2017, Rosevil)
- Otro intento más (La Vuelta 19)
- No me sale (Dreamers Music) 2019
- Rey del rap rey del pop (Dreamers Music) 2019
- No lo sé (La Mexicana, 2020 ft. Paty Cantú)
- M.F.Q.N. Más Fuertes Que Nunca (Red Bull Records 2022, ft. Aczino)
- Ron en mi Vaso (Red Bull Records Inc, 2022)

== Television ==
- Ritmo urbano on La 2 (2018–2019)
- Proyecto Arkano on La 1 (2019)
- La Voz Kids on Antena 3 (2019)
- Typical Spanish on La 1 (2020)
- Duel de veus on À Punt (2021)
- El juego de los anillos on Antena 3 (2021)
- MasterChef Celebrity 6 on La 1 (2021); as a contestant (10th evicted)
- 25 palabras on Telecinco (2023); as a guest
- Supervivientes 2024 on Telecinco (2024); as a contestant (current)

== Bibliography ==
- Arkano (2016). Asalto al vacío: ¿cómo he llegado hasta aquí?. Ediciones Martínez Roca. ISBN 9788427042131.
- Arkano (2018). Castillos en el espacio. Ediciones Martínez Roca. ISBN 9788427045002.
