= Supervivientes =

- Also known as: Supervivientes: Expedición Robinson; La isla de los famoS.O.S.; La selva de los famoS.O.S.; Aventura en África
- Genre: Reality game show
- Created by: Charlie Parsons
- Based on: Expedition Robinson; L'isola dei famosi
- Directed by: Joaquín Zamora (2000–2005); Patxi Alonso (2003–2005); Toni Sevilla (2006–2009); Javier López Reboredo (2006); Angelo Ferrari (2006–2007, 2010–2011, 2014–2015); Jordi Rosell (2007–2010); Josep Tomás (2011–2023); Óscar Vega (2015–2023); Raúl Prieto (2024); Ángel Ludeña (2024–present)
- Presented by: Galas: Juanma López Iturriaga (2000); Paco Lobatón (2001); Alonso Caparrós (2003); Nuria Roca (2003–2005); Jesús Vázquez (2006–2010); Jorge Javier Vázquez (2011–present); On-set: Juanma López Iturriaga (2000–2001); Paula Vázquez (2003–2005); José María Íñigo (2006); Mario Picazo (2007–2009); Eva González (2010); Raquel Sánchez Silva (2011–2014); Lara Álvarez (2015–2022); Laura Madrueño (2023–present)
- Theme music composer: Valeriano Chiaravalle; Antonella Martina
- Country of origin: Spain
- No. of seasons: 22

Production
- Production companies: Globomedia (2000–2005); Magnolia (2006–2015); Bulldog TV (2016–2023); Cuarzo Producciones (2024–)

Original release
- Network: Telecinco
- Release: 10 September 2000 – 13 December 2001
- Network: Antena 3
- Release: 23 January 2003 – 15 March 2005
- Network: Telecinco
- Release: 2 May 2006 – present

Related
- Expedition Robinson; Survivor (American TV series); L'Isola dei Famosi

Survivor Spain (In Spanish: Supervivientes) is the Spanish version of the reality series Survivor. This version of the show has aired on Spanish broadcast channels Telecinco, from 2000 to 2001 and 2006 to the present, Antena 3, from 2003 to 2005, and on laSiete from 2009 to 2014.

Throughout its time on air in Spain, Survivor has gone by many names. From 2000 to 2001 it was known as Supervivientes: Expedicion Robinson, a show that closely followed the American version of the program. From 2003 to 2004 it was known as La isla de los FamoS.O.S, which, unlike its previous incarnation, resembled more of a Big Brother format and included celebrities as contestants (this format would be carried over to all future versions of the show). In 2005, it was known as Aventura en África and since 2006 it has been called Supervivientes: Perdidos en Honduras or, simply, Supervivientes.

The show was originally commissioned by TVE under the name Supervivientes: Expedición Imposible, yet they shelved the programme after recording, upon seeing the furore attracted by Gran Hermano. After this programme eventually became a hit, Telecinco immediately picked it up. For many years afterwards, the castaways were indeed nicknamed "Robinsones" as a legacy of the prerecorded first series.

Supervivientes has stayed in Honduras since 2011, however on Telecinco the show previously went to Panama, the Seychelles, the Dominican Republic and Nicaragua; while the show went to the Dominican Republic (twice), Brazil and Kenya on Antena 3. The show's filming in Honduras has been the subject of a legal case at the Inter-American Court of Human Rights. In the 2025 Comunidad Garífuna de Cayos Cochinos y sus miembros v Honduras case, this Court ruled that the restriction of access to the beaches while Supervivientes was being filmed there, constituted a violation of the human rights of the Indigenous Garífuna of Cayos Cochinos.

The show's crew is made up of 350 people - 150 stay in Madrid while 250 work on-set in Honduras. The show was made into a Wii game in 2009.

== Format and rules ==
Spanish Survivor followed the format of the American Survivor initially.

Aside from its original format, all subsequent versions of the Spanish version have followed a different set of rules closer to the Italian version, that have included a public vote, nominations, evictions, and a winner chosen by the public. The prize for the winner has varied from season to season depending on the show's current format: for the first two editions, the prize was valued in pesetas, and thereafter in euros.

The show generally gives the castaways a couple of weeks to settle in before evictions start. Episodes usually include an immunity and reward challenge, yet these are done live and so do not take as much time as those in other versions. The general rule of thumb for evictions is that multiple castaways are nominated by the cast, and one castaway (usually the immunity winner, but in some years it has been the nominated castaway) will nominate someone else to go up against in a public vote.

== Spanish Survivor seasons ==
=== Telecinco ===
No	Series	Location	Hosts				Release		Days	Castaways (n.º)	Result		Series average
No	Series	Location	Galas	On set	Debates (Conexión Honduras)	Tierra de nadie	Premiere date	Finale date	Days	Castaways (n.º)	Winner	Prize	Series average
1	Supervivientes: Expedición Robinson 2000	Bastimentos, Panama		Juanma López Iturriaga			10 September 2000	3 December 2000	49	16	Xavier Monjonell	10,000,000 Pts	2.88 million
2	Supervivientes: Expedición Robinson 2001	North and Silhouette Islands, Seychelles	Paco Lobatón	Juanma López Iturriaga			16 September 2001	20 December 2001	96	16	Alfredo Freddy Cortina	20,000,000 Pts	3.35 million
7	Supervivientes: Perdidos en el Caribe (2006)	Samaná, Dominican Republic	Jesús Vázquez	José María Íñigo			2 May 2006	11 July 2006	71	13	Carmen Russo	€200,000	3.31 million
8	Supervivientes: Perdidos en Honduras (2007)	Cayos Cochinos, Honduras	Jesús Vázquez	Mario Picazo	Lucía Riaño		19 April 2007	28 June 2007	71	13	Nilo Manrique	€200,000	3.32 million
9	Supervivientes: Perdidos en Honduras (2008)	Cayos Cochinos, Honduras	Jesús Vázquez	Mario Picazo	Emma García		17 January 2008	27 March 2008	71	13	Miriam Sánchez	€200,000	3.52 million
9	Supervivientes: Perdidos en Honduras (2008)	Cayos Cochinos, Honduras	Jesús Vázquez	Óscar Martínez*	Emma García		17 January 2008	27 March 2008	71	13	Miriam Sánchez	€200,000	3.52 million
10	Supervivientes: Perdidos en Honduras (2009)	Cayos Cochinos, Honduras	Jesús Vázquez	Mario Picazo	Daniel Domenjó		19 March 2009	11 June 2009	85	15	Maite Zúñiga	€200,000	2.91 million
10	Supervivientes: Perdidos en Honduras (2009)	Cayos Cochinos, Honduras	Christian Gálvez*	Mario Picazo	Daniel Domenjó		19 March 2009	11 June 2009	85	15	Maite Zúñiga	€200,000	2.91 million
11	Supervivientes: Perdidos en Nicaragua (2010)	Lime Cay-Pearl Keys, Nicaragua	Jesús Vázquez	Eva González	Emma García		6 May 2010	25 July 2010	81	20	María José Fernández	€200,000	2.37 million
12	Supervivientes: Perdidos en Honduras (2011)	Cayos Cochinos, Honduras	Jorge Javier Vázquez	Raquel Sánchez-Silva	Christian Gálvez		5 May 2011	28 July 2011	85	19	Rosa Benito	€200,000	3.69 million
13	Supervivientes: Perdidos en Honduras (2014)	Cayos Cochinos, Honduras	Jorge Javier Vázquez	Raquel Sánchez-Silva	Álvaro de la Lama		17 March 2014	27 May 2014	72	22	Abraham García	€200,000	2.96 million
14	Supervivientes: Perdidos en Honduras (2015)	Cayos Cochinos, Honduras	Jorge Javier Vázquez	Lara Álvarez	Raquel Sánchez-Silva		16 April 2015	12 July 2015	88	17	Christopher Mateo	€200,000	3.35 million
15	Supervivientes: Perdidos en Honduras (2016)	Cayos Cochinos, Honduras	Jorge Javier Vázquez	Lara Álvarez	Sandra Barneda		21 April 2016	12 July 2016	83	16	Jorge Díaz	€200,000	3.08 million
16	Supervivientes: Perdidos en Honduras (2017)	Cayos Cochinos, Honduras	Jorge Javier Vázquez	Lara Álvarez	Sandra Barneda	Jorge Javier Vázquez	20 April 2017	20 July 2017	92	16	José Luis Losa	€200,000	2.90 million
17	Supervivientes: Perdidos en Honduras (2018)	Cayos Cochinos, Honduras	Jorge Javier Vázquez	Lara Álvarez	Sandra Barneda	Jorge Javier Vázquez	15 March 2018	14 June 2018	92	17	Sofía Suescun	€200,000	3.31 million
18	Supervivientes: Perdidos en Honduras (2019)	Cayos Cochinos, Honduras	Jorge Javier Vázquez	Lara Álvarez	Jordi González	Carlos Sobera	25 April 2019	18 July 2019	85	18	Omar Montes	€200,000	3.51 million
19	Supervivientes: Perdidos en Honduras (2020)	Cayos Cochinos, Honduras	Jorge Javier Vázquez	Lara Álvarez	Jordi González	Carlos Sobera	20 February 2020	4 June 2020	105	17	Jorge Pérez	€200,000	3.49 million
19	Supervivientes: Perdidos en Honduras (2020)	Cayos Cochinos, Honduras	Jorge Javier Vázquez	Lara Álvarez	Sonsoles Ónega	Carlos Sobera	20 February 2020	4 June 2020	105	17	Jorge Pérez	€200,000	3.49 million
20	Supervivientes: Perdidos en Honduras (2021)	Cayos Cochinos, Honduras	Jorge Javier Vázquez	Lara Álvarez	Jordi González	Carlos Sobera	8 April 2021	23 July 2021	106	16	Olga Moreno	€200,000	2.35 million
21	Supervivientes: Perdidos en Honduras (2022)	Cayos Cochinos, Honduras	Jorge Javier Vázquez	Lara Álvarez	Ion Aramendi	Carlos Sobera	21 April 2022	28 July 2022	99	16	Alejandro Nieto	€200,000	2.09 million
22	Supervivientes: Perdidos en Honduras (2023)	Cayos Cochinos, Honduras	Jorge Javier Vázquez	Laura Madrueño	Ion Aramendi	Carlos Sobera	2 March 2023	29 June 2023	120	19	Bosco Martínez-Bordiú	€200,000	1.64 million
22	Supervivientes: Perdidos en Honduras (2023)	Cayos Cochinos, Honduras	Carlos Sobera*	Laura Madrueño	Ion Aramendi	Carlos Sobera	2 March 2023	29 June 2023	120	19	Bosco Martínez-Bordiú	€200,000	1.64 million
23	Supervivientes: Perdidos en Honduras (2024)	Cayos Cochinos, Honduras	Jorge Javier Vázquez	Laura Madrueño	Sandra Barneda	Carlos Sobera	7 March 2024	18 June 2024	104	20	Pedro García Aguado	€200,000	1.47 million
24	Supervivientes: Perdidos en Honduras (2025)	Cayos Cochinos, Honduras	Jorge Javier Vázquez	Laura Madrueño	Sandra Barneda	Carlos Sobera	6 March 2025	17 June 2025	104	21	Borja González	€200,000	1.47 million
25	Supervivientes: Perdidos en Honduras (2026)	Cayos Cochinos, Honduras	Jorge Javier Vázquez	Maria Lamela	Sandra Barneda	Ion Aramendi	5 March 2026	11 June 2026	98	22	Maica Benedicto	€200,000	?

* Filled in when usual presenter was unavailable.

=== All Stars Editions ===
No	Series	Location	Hosts				Release		Days	Castaways (n.º)	Result		Series average
No	Series	Location	Galas	On set	Debates (Conexión Honduras)	Tierra de nadie	Premiere date	Finale date	Days	Castaways (n.º)	Winner	Prize	Series average
1	Supervivientes: All Stars	Cayos Cochinos, Honduras	Jorge Javier Vázquez	Laura Madrueño	Sandra Barneda	Carlos Sobera	20 June 2024	28 July 2024	39	10	Marta Peñate	€50,000	1.31 million
2	Supervivientes: All Stars 2	Cayos Cochinos, Honduras	Jorge Javier Vázquez	Laura Madrueño	Sandra Barneda	Jorge Javier Vázquez	4 September 2025	30 October 2025	57	14	Rubén Torres	€50,000	1.02 million

=== Antena 3 ===
No	Season	Location	Hosts			Release		Days	Castaways (n.º)	Result		Series average
No	Season	Location	Studio	On-set	Debates	Premiere date	Finale date	Days	Castaways (n.º)	Winner	Prize	Series average
3	La Isla de los FamoS.O.S. 1	Dominican Republic	Alonso Caparrós	Paula Vázquez		23 January 2003	27 February 2003	36	9	Daniela Cardone	€60,000	2.49 million
4	La Isla de los FamoS.O.S. 2	Dominican Republic	Nuria Roca	Paula Vázquez		7 May 2003	25 June 2003	50	17	Felipe López	€200,000	2.39 million
5	La Selva de los FamoS.O.S.	Brazil	Nuria Roca	Paula Vázquez		14 January 2004	10 March 2004	57	17	Canales Rivera	€60,000	2.46 million
6	Aventura en África	Kenya	Nuria Roca	Paula Vázquez	Alicia Ramírez	11 January 2005	15 March 2005	64	19	Víctor Janeiro	€60,000	2.53 million

== Pasaporte a la isla ==
Pasaporte a la isla (English: Passport to the island) was broadcast on Telecinco as a qualifying round for Supervivientes produced by Magnolia, aired in the Gran Hermano house. A spin-off of Supervivientes, the prize was a spot to participate in Supervivientes 2016.

No	Series	Location	Launch date	Finale date	Days	Contestants (n.º)	Winners	The Grand Prize	Series average
1	Pasaporte a la isla	Guadalix de la Sierra	19 July 2015	31 August 2015	44	13	Cristian Nieto M.ª Carmen Torrecillas	€20,000	1.29 million
