= Lucía Lapiedra =

Spanish pornographic actress (born 1981)

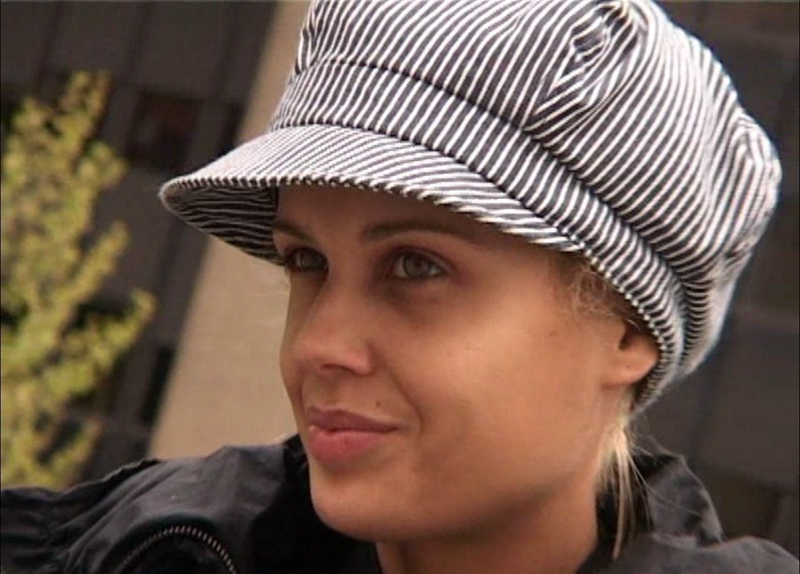
- Lapiedra in an interview for 20 minutos, 2008
- Born: Miriam Sánchez; 31 January 1981 (age 45); Vallecas, Madrid, Spain
- Other name: Gina
- Height: 5 ft 5 in (1.65 m)

Lucía Lapiedra (born Miriam Sanchez on 31 January 1981) is a former Spanish pornographic actress, who has been called the Queen of Porn.

== Biography ==
In spite of declaring herself as a pornographic actress at that time, her films were not on sale. Months later she appeared in the Spanish mainstream film Torrente 3: El Protector, directed by Santiago Segura and starring along Oliver Stone.

She participated in the Survivor Spain reality TV show, Perdidos en Honduras, in 2008, and won the competition.

== Awards ==
- 2005 FICEB Ninfa Prize winner – Best Spanish Starlet – La Santidad del Mal
- 2006 FICEB Ninfa Prize nominee – Best Spanish Actress – Posesión

== Partial filmography ==
(See external links for complete lists)

- Nacho Rides Again
- Obsession
- Possession
- Nacho Vidal iniciando a Lucía Lapiedra
- La Venganza de las Ninfas
- La Perversion de Lucía - La Santidad del Mal
