= Supervivientes: Perdidos en Honduras (2018) =

- Presented by: Jorge Javier Vázquez; Lara Álvarez
- No. of days: 92
- No. of castaways: 17
- Winner: Sofía Suescun
- Runner-up: Logan Sampedro
- Location: Cayos Cochinos, Honduras
- No. of episodes: 15

Release
- Original network: Telecinco
- Original release: 15 March – 14 June 2018

Season chronology
- ← Previous; 2017 Next → 2019

Supervivientes 2018: Perdidos en Honduras is the thirteenth season of the show Supervivientes and the seventeenth season of Survivor to air in Spain. It was broadcast on Telecinco from 15 March 2018 and 14 June 2018. Jorge Javier Vázquez was the main host at the central studio in Madrid, with Lara Álvarez co-hosting from the island and Sandra Barneda hosting a side debate of the program. The crew fled to Honduras on March 8. Ultimately, it was Sofía Suescun who won this season over Logan Sampedro and Raquel Mosquera.

== Cast ==
The first contestant announced was María Lapiedra, who was announced the previous season when she visited the island as a guest. The second contestant announced was Raquel Mosquera on February 21 during Sálvame Diario. On February 24, Mayte Zaldívar was confirmed as the third contestant during Sábado Deluxe. On February 26, Francisco was confirmed as the fourth contestant. The fifth contestant announced was Adrián Rodríguez on February 28 during Got Talent. On March 2, Saray Montoya was announced as the sixth contestant during Cámbiame. On March 3, Isabel Castell was confirmed as the seventh contestant during Sábado Deluxe. The eight contestant announced was Maestro Joao on March 4 during Viva la Vida. The ninth contestant announced was Sofía Suescun on March 5 during MyHyV. On March 6, Sergio Carvajal was confirmed as the tenth contestant. On March 8, Melissa Vargas was confirmed as the eleventh contestant in the radio show Morning Glory. The twelfth and thirteenth contestants announced were Fernando Marcos and Alberto Isla on March 9 during El programa de Ana Rosa y Sálvame Diario respectively. On March 10, María Jesús Ruiz was confirmed as the fourteenth contestant during Viva la Vida. On March 11, the last two contestants announced were Romina Malaspina and Daniel Sampedro 'Logan'. Hugo Paz entered on Week 5 as a replacement because of the low number of contestants still on the game, due to the quittings and ejections that happened in the early weeks.

Contestant	Occupation/Famous For	Original tribe	Switched tribe	Merged tribe	Finish
Adrián Rodríguez; 29, Barcelona	Actor	Civilized			Quit; Day 18
Saray Montoya; 37, Seville	Los Gipsy Kings star	Wild			Ejected; Day 22
María Lapiedra; 33, Barcelona	Erotic model and television panelist	Civilized			Quit; Day 25
Fernando Marcos; 44, Marbella; Mayte's boyfriend	Entrepreneur	Wild			1st voted out Day 29
Mayte Zaldívar; 63, Marbella; Fernando's girlfriend	Operation Malaya convicted	Wild	Lookout zone		2nd voted out Day 36
Isabel Castell; 33, Madrid	Fitness model and economist	Civilized	Cabeza de León		3rd voted out Day 43
Melissa Vargas; 27, Granada	MyHyV participant	Civilized	Cayo Paloma		4th voted out Day 50
Alberto Isla; 24, Sanlúcar de Barrameda	Television personality	Wild	Cabeza de León		5th voted out Day 57
Romina Malaspina; 23, Buenos Aires, Argentina	Model and reality television star	Wild	Cabeza de León	Merged	6th voted out Day 64
Francisco; 59, Alcoy	Singer	Civilized	Cabeza de León	Merged	7th voted out Day 71
María Jesús Ruiz; 35, Andújar	Miss Spain 2004 and actress	Wild	Cabeza de León	Merged	8th voted out Day 78
Hugo Paz; 25, Puerto de Santa María	MyHyV star		Cayo Paloma	Merged	9th voted out Day 85
Maestro Joao; 53, Madrid	Fortune teller	Wild	Cabeza de León	Merged	10th voted out Day 85
Sergio Carvajal; 24, Calafell	Instagram model	Civilized	Cayo Paloma	Merged	11th voted out Day 91
Raquel Mosquera; 48, Madrid	Television personality	Wild	Cayo Paloma	Merged	Third Place; Day 92
Logan Sampedro; 26, Oviedo	Míster Global España 2017	Civilized	Cayo Paloma	Merged	Runner-Up; Day 92
Sofía Suescun; 21, Pamplona	Gran Hermano 16 winner	Civilized	Cayo Paloma	Merged	Sole Survivor; Day 92

== Nominations ==
	Week 1	Week 2	Week 3	Week 4	Week 5	Week 6	Week 7	Week 8	Week 9	Week 10	Week 11	Week 12	Week 13	Final		Total votes
Sofía	Melissa	Francisco	Isabel	Isabel	Francisco	Hugo	Hugo	Sergio	Hugo	Mª Jesús	Mª Jesús	Logan; Hugo	Immune	Nominated	Sole Survivor (Day 92)	20
Logan	Isabel	Saray	Raquel	Mª Jesús	Mª Jesús	Melissa	Hugo	Raquel	Raquel	Sofía	Sofía	Raquel; Sofía	Immune	Finalist	Runner-Up (Day 92)	7
Raquel	Mayte	Mayte	Fernando	Fernando	Romina	Melissa	Exempt	Sergio	Romina	Hugo	Mª Jesús	Hugo; Logan	Nominated	Nominated	Third Place (Day 92)	19
Sergio	Francisco	Sofía	María	Sofía	Francisco	Raquel	Melissa	Raquel	Raquel	Raquel	Sofía	Joao	Nominated	Eliminated (Day 91)		2
Joao	Saray	Raquel	Saray	Mª Jesús	Raquel	Francisco	Francisco	~~Mª Jesús~~	Raquel	Francisco	Raquel	Hugo; Logan	~~Logan~~	Eliminated (Day 85)		3
Hugo	Not in the game				Francisco	Sofía	Melissa	Sergio	Raquel	Sofía	Sofía	Raquel; Sofía	~~Sofía~~	Eliminated (Day 85)		9
Mª Jesús	Alberto	Mayte	Saray	Fernando	Raquel	Francisco	Francisco	~~Joao~~	Raquel	Francisco	Raquel	Logan (x3)	Eliminated (Day 78)			15
Francisco	Melissa	Sofía	Sofía	Sergio	Sofía	Mª Jesús	Mª Jesús	~~Romina~~	Mª Jesús	Mª Jesús	Mª Jesús	Eliminated (Day 71)				15
Romina	Mayte	Mayte	Saray	Fernando	Raquel	Isabel	Alberto	~~Mª Jesús~~	Raquel	Francisco	Eliminated (Day 64)					3
Alberto	Raquel	Sofía	Sofía	Sofía	Sofía	Joao	Joao	~~Mª Jesús~~	~~Sofía~~	Eliminated (Day 57)						2
Melissa	Francisco	Lookout zone				Hugo	Hugo	Logan	Eliminated (Day 50)							6
Isabel	Francisco	Francisco	Sofía	Sofía	Sofía	Mª Jesús	Francisco	Eliminated (Day 43)								3
Mayte	Saray	Raquel	Lookout zone			Eliminated (Day 36)										7
Fernando	Romina	Raquel	Saray	Mª Jesús	Eliminated (Day 29)											4
María	Melissa	Alberto	Isabel	Lookout zone	Left Competition (Day 25)											0
Saray	Mayte	Mayte	Fernando	Ejected (Day 22)												6
Adrián	Melissa	Alberto	Sofía	Left Competition (Day 18)												0
Notes	See note 1,2	See note 3,4,5	See note 6,7	See note 8,9,10	See note 11,12, 13, 14	See note 15,16	See note 17, 18, 19	See note 18, 20 21, 22	See note 18, 23, 24, 25	See note 18, 26, 27, 28	See note 18, 29, 30	See note 31, 32	See note 18, 33, 34	See note 35	None	
Nominated by Tribe	Mayte; Melissa	Mayte; Sofía	Saray; Sofía	Mª Jesús; Sofía	Raquel; Sofía	Francisco; Hugo	Francisco; Hugo	~~Mª Jesús~~; Raquel	Raquel; Romina	Francisco; Sofía	Mª Jesús; Raquel	Hugo; Logan	-			
Nominated by Leader	Isabel; Saray	Alberto; Raquel	María; Raquel	Fernando; Sergio	Francisco; Mª Jesús	Isabel; Melissa	Alberto; Melissa	~~Romina~~; Sergio	Hugo	Raquel	Sofía	Joao	-			
Nominated	Isabel; Mayte; Melissa; Saray	Alberto; Mayte; Raquel; Sofía	María; Raquel; ~~Saray~~; Sofía	Fernando; Mª Jesús; Romina; Sergio; Sofía	Francisco; Mª Jesús; Raquel; Sofía	Francisco; Hugo; Isabel; Melissa	Alberto; Francisco; Hugo; Melissa	Alberto; Joao; Mª Jesús; Raquel; Romina; Sergio	Hugo; Logan; Raquel; Romina; Sergio	Francisco; Logan; Raquel; Sofía	Mª Jesús; Raquel; Sofía	Hugo; Joao; Logan	Raquel; Sergio	Raquel; Sofía	Logan; Sofía	
Eliminated	Melissa; Fewest votes to save	Mayte; Fewest votes to save	María; Fewest votes to save	Fernando; Fewest votes to save	Mª Jesús; Fewest votes to save	Isabel; 15.2% to save	Melissa; Fewest votes to save	Alberto; Fewest votes to save	Romina; Fewest votes to save	Francisco; Fewest votes to save	Mª Jesús; Fewest votes to save	Hugo; Fewest votes to save	Sergio; Fewest votes to save	Raquel; Fewest votes to save	Logan; 46.2% to win	
Eliminated	Melissa; Fewest votes to save	Mayte; Fewest votes to save	María; Fewest votes to save	Fernando; Fewest votes to save	Mª Jesús; Fewest votes to save	Isabel; 15.2% to save	Melissa; Fewest votes to save	Alberto; Fewest votes to save	Romina; Fewest votes to save	Francisco; Fewest votes to save	Mª Jesús; Fewest votes to save	Joao; Fewest votes to save	Sergio; Fewest votes to save	Raquel; Fewest votes to save	Sofía; 53.8% to win	
The Lookout Nominated				Fernando; Mayte; Melissa	Mª Jesús; Mayte; Melissa											
The Lookout Eliminated				Fernando; Most votes to eliminate	Mayte; Most votes to eliminate											

- Contestant was fake evicted and sent to the Lookout zone.
- Contestant was leader and whoever they nominated would automatically face elimination (Immune).
- Contestant was nominated.
- Contestant was exempt.

=== Notes ===
- ^Note 1: As the leaders of the teams, Joao and Logan were given the power to name a nominee.
- ^Note 2: Melissa was fake evicted and was sent to the Lookout zone.
- ^Note 3: Logan and Alberto swapped teams on week 2.
- ^Note 4: As the leaders of the teams, Fernando and María were given the power to name a nominee.
- ^Note 5: Mayte was fake evicted and was sent to the Lookout zone.
- ^Note 6: As the leaders of the teams, Logan and Sergio were given the power to name a nominee.
- ^Note 7: María was fake evicted and was sent to the Lookout zone.
- ^Note 8: As the leaders of the teams, Francisco and Raquel were given the power to name a nominee.
- ^Note 9: Romina was automatically nominated due to her bad behaviour.
- ^Note 10: Fernando was fake evicted and was sent to the Lookout zone.
- ^Note 11: As the leaders of the teams, Hugo and Logan were given the power to name a nominee.
- ^Note 12: María Jesús left the island on Day 30 due to judicial reasons, but she returned five days later on Day 35.
- ^Note 13: María Jesús was fake evicted and was sent to the Lookout zone.
- ^Note 14: After the eviction of Mayte, María Jesús and Melissa survived and returned as official tribemates and then, all contestants were split in two new groups decided by the public.
- ^Note 15: As the leaders of the teams, Logan and Romina were given the power to name a nominee.
- ^Note 16: There was a tie between Francisco and María Jesús and Romina, as leader, broke it nominating Francisco.
- ^Note 17: Raquel was exempt from nominations as she was being attending by doctors for medical reasons.
- ^Note 18: From this round of nominations, the Judas Kiss twist was introduced and the evicted contestant could nominate a member of its team.
- ^Note 19: As the leaders of the teams, Romina and Sergio were given the power to name a nominee.
- ^Note 20: Due to a complot to intentionally nominate Mª Jesús as a group, the program decided to nominate all the members of the tribe except the leader.
- ^Note 21: As the leaders of the teams, Francisco and Hugo were given the power to name a nominee.
- ^Note 22: There was a tie between Raquel and Sergio and Hugo, as leader, broke it nominating Raquel.
- ^Note 23: Logan and Sergio were automatically nominated for breaking the rules.
- ^Note 24: As the winner of the immunity challenge, Sofía was given the power to name a nominee.
- ^Note 25: There was a tie between Mª Jesús and Romina and Sofía, as leader, broke it nominating Romina.
- ^Note 26: Sofía found a hidden nomination idol and she could automatically nominate a contestant. She nominated Logan.
- ^Note 27: As the winner of the immunity challenge, Sergio was given the power to name a nominee.
- ^Note 28: There was a tie between Mª Jesús and Sofía and Sergio, as leader, broke it nominating Sofía.
- ^Note 29: As the winner of the immunity challenge, Logan was given the power to name a nominee.
- ^Note 30: There was a tie between Raquel and Sofía and Logan, as leader, broke it nominating Raquel.
- ^Note 31: Mª Jesús received 3 extra points in the nominations in a task, however, because of her eviction, her Judas Kiss counted as 3 points.
- ^Note 32: As the winner of the immunity challenge, Sergio was given the power to name a nominee.
- ^Note 33: Logan and Sofía were the contestants who played the immunity challenge, however, due to the hardness of the challenge they were named both leaders and therefore immune from nominations.
- ^Note 34: As Logan and Sofía were leaders, only Raquel and Sergio could be nominated.
- ^Note 35: Logan won the last immunity challenge and went through the final vote. Raquel and Sofía were nominated.

== Tribes ==
	Pre-merge tribes		
	Civilizado	Salvaje	Lookout zone
Week 1	Adrián; Francisco; Isabel; María; Melissa; Logan; Sergio; Sofía	Alberto; Fernando; Joao; Mayte; Mª Jesús; Raquel; Romina; Saray	
Week 2	Adrián; Alberto; Francisco; Isabel; María; Sergio; Sofía	Fernando; Logan; Joao; Mayte; Mª Jesús; Raquel; Romina; Saray	Melissa
Week 3	~~Adrián~~; Alberto; Francisco; Isabel; María; Sergio; Sofía	Fernando; Logan; Joao; Mª Jesús; Raquel; Romina; ~~Saray~~	Melissa; Mayte
Week 4	Alberto; Francisco; Isabel; Sergio; Sofía	Fernando; Logan; Joao; Mª Jesús; Raquel; Romina	Melissa; Mayte; ~~María~~
Week 5	Logan; Joao; Mª Jesús; Raquel; Romina	Alberto; Francisco; Hugo; Isabel; Sergio; Sofía	Melissa; Mayte
	Pre-merge tribes		
	Cayo Paloma		Cabeza de León
Week 6	Hugo; Logan; Melissa; Raquel; Sergio; Sofía		Alberto; Francisco; Isabel; Joao; Mª Jesús; Romina
Week 7	Hugo; Logan; Melissa; Raquel; Sergio; Sofía		Alberto; Francisco; Joao; Mª Jesús; Romina
Week 8	Alberto; Francisco; Joao; Mª Jesús; Romina		Hugo; Logan; Raquel; Sergio; Sofía

== Ratings ==
=== "Galas" ===
Show N°	Day	Viewers	Ratings share
1 - Launch	Thursday, March 15	2.960.000	26.5%
2	Thursday, March 22	2.760.000	24.7%
3	Thursday, March 29	2.760.000	24.6%
4	Thursday, April 5	3.724.000	32.5%
5	Thursday, April 12	3.248.000	29.5%
6	Thursday, April 19	3.127.000	29.3%
7	Thursday, April 26	3.253.000	30.0%
8	Thursday, May 3	2.976.000	27.2%
9	Thursday, May 10	3.269.000	29.2%
10	Thursday, May 17	3.536.000	31.5%
11	Thursday, May 24	3.303.000	30.4%
12	Thursday, May 31	3.228.000	28.9%
13	Thursday, June 7	3.479.000	31.3%
14 - Finale 1	Wednesday, June 13	3.861.000	27.1%
15 - Finale 2	Thursday, June 14	4.194.000	35.0%

=== "Conexión Honduras" ===
Show N°	Day	Viewers	Ratings share
1	Sunday, March 18	2.147.000	16.0%
2	Sunday, March 25	2.709.000	18.9%
3	Sunday, April 1	2.768.000	20.9%
4	Sunday, April 8	3.085.000	22.4%
5	Sunday, April 15	2.683.000	19.9%
6	Sunday, April 22	2.677.000	19.6%
7	Sunday, April 29	2.493.000	18.8%
8	Sunday, May 6	2.346.000	17.3%
9	Sunday, May 13	2.554.000	19.2%
10	Sunday, May 20	2.670.000	20.1%
11	Sunday, May 27	2.774.000	21.3%
12	Sunday, June 3	2.851.000	25.2%
13	Sunday, June 10	2.822.000	20.0%
14	Sunday, June 17	2.973.000	18.7%

=== "Tierra de Nadie" ===
Show N°	Day	Viewers	Ratings share
1	Tuesday, March 20	2.861.000	20.2%
2	Tuesday, March 27	2.402.000	23.0%
3	Tuesday, April 3	2.696.000	21.7%
4	Tuesday, April 10	2.860.000	22.4%
5	Tuesday, April 17	2.865.000	25.3%
6	Tuesday, April 24	2.758.000	24.2%
7	Tuesday, May 1	2.648.000	23.1%
8	Tuesday, May 8	2.768.000	25.0%
9	Tuesday, May 15	2.941.000	25.4%
10	Tuesday, May 22	3.120.000	22.8%
11	Tuesday, May 29	3.085.000	22.4%
12	Tuesday, June 5	2.620.000	24.6%

=== "Última Hora / Camino a la final / Cuentas pendientes" ===
Show N°	Day	Viewers	Ratings share
1	Wednesday, May 23	2.849.000	19.8%
2	Wednesday, May 30	2.896.000	20.7%
3	Monday, June 11	2.672.000	18.8%
4	Monday, June 18	1.827.000	13.2%
