= Ion Aramendi =

Spanish television presenter

Ion Aramendi Urrestarazu (born 11 February 1977) is a Spanish journalist, television presenter and former basketball player. He presented programmes such as El cazador, the Spanish version of The Chase, on La 1 of Televisión Española. In 2022 he moved to Mediaset's Telecinco, presenting shows such as Supervivientes, Gran Hermano VIP and Factor X.

== Biography ==
Born in San Sebastián in the Basque Country, Aramendi moved to Salamanca in Castile and León in 1996 to play basketball for CB Tormes and CB Avenida. During his time there, he also studied journalism at the Pontifical University of Salamanca. In 2002, he returned home to play for Santurtzi CB.

He began in television in 2009 as a reporter on the tabloid television programme Sálvame on Telecinco. In 2016, he moved to ETB 2 in his native region to present the current affairs programme ¡Qué me estás contando!, as well as New Year's Eve programmes on EITB.

In December 2019, Aramendi returned to national television as the host of El cazador on La 1, the Spanish adaptation of the British game show The Chase. His final episode was broadcast in May 2022, after he left Televisión Española to return to Telecinco.

In March and April 2020, Aramendi presented Todos en casa, a variety show at the start of the COVID-19 lockdown. It was broadcast from his home, with his family.

In February 2021, Aramendi was announced as the co-presenter of The Dancer with Sandra Cervera, an adaptation of The Greatest Dancer on La 1.

In 2022, Aramendi returned to Telecinco to present the debate show of Supervivientes, the Spanish version of Survivor. Later in the year, he was tipped to host a new daily show titled El ático, but after the project failed to make it past the pilot stage, in November he was announced as the presenter of Reacción en cadena, the Spanish adaptation of the American game show Chain Reaction.

In 2023, Aramendi became the host of the nightly "debate" episodes of the Gran Hermano VIP reality show reboot. In February 2024, he was announced as the host for the upcoming fourth season of the relaunched Factor X.

== Personal life ==
Aramendi married María in Salamanca in 2011. As of 2020, they had two sons. He is the third of four brothers, who were all teammates at CB Avenida in 2000–01.
