= Lara Álvarez =

Spanish journalist and TV host

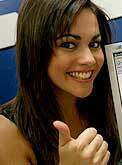
- Born: Lara Álvarez González; 29 May 1986 (age 39); Gijón, Spain
- Occupation(s): Journalist, television presenter
- Employer: Telemadrid (2006); Animax (2010); TeleAsturias (2010); MARCA TV (2010–2011); Cuatro (2011–2013); Antena 3 (2013–2014); Mediaset España (2014–present)
- Partners: Fernando Alonso (2014–2016)
- Parent(s): Raúl Álvarez; Gracia González

Lara Álvarez González (born in Gijón on May 29, 1986) is a Spanish journalist and television presenter.

== Biography ==
She studied at the Inmaculada School in Gijón and graduated in journalism at the Villanueva University. One of her teachers at the university was Nieves Herrero, who gave her her first opportunity at the age of 19 as a contributor to the program Hoy por ti on Telemadrid. In 2006, before starting her career as a journalist and sports presenter, she participated in an advertising campaign by Tiempo BBDO for MTV: a song entitled "Amo a Laura -pero esperaré hasta el matrimonio-", a parody of pre-marital chastity, performed by a fake musical group called Los Happiness. She was host of the program Ahorro y finanzas for TeleAsturias and in 2010 she was a reporter for the program Animax Comandos, on the Animax channel.

Also in 2010 she joined, along with Enrique Marqués and Juan Antonio Villanueva, the team of the program Marca gol, of MARCA TV, and the sports news program Tiramillas, of the same channel. On December 21 of the same year she joined the team of La Sexta Deportes, where she worked as a presenter and reporter, and on December 31 of the same month she was in charge of the New Year's Eve chimes for MARCA TV with the director of the channel, Felipe del Campo.

On July 11, 2011, she joined Cuatro, where she was in charge of sports information for the news program Qué quieres que te diga, an adaptation of España Directo, which was a ratings failure and was withdrawn a few weeks after its premiere. From September of the same year until February 2012, she presented the night edition of Deportes Cuatro, a program she left to join the new MotoGP broadcasting team.

On February 26, 2013 Mediaset España announced that she and Marco Rocha were being fired to broadcast the MotoGP races of the following season. On August 22 of the same year she signed with La Sexta to co-present the second season of Jugones, a sports news program, until March 4, 2014, when she announced that she was leaving the program to undertake new projects. At the end of the same month she began collaborating with the programme En el aire on the same channel.

At the end of August 2014, it was announced her incorporation, as co-host, to the morning programme Espejo público, at Antena 3. On September 23 of the same year, it was announced her incorporation to the radio program 80 y la madre, at M80 Radio, and in December it was announced her return to the Mediaset España group. A month later, in January 2015, she joined the programme Todo va bien as a replacement for the singer Edurne, and on March 11 it was confirmed her incorporation as a presenter from the island of the programme Supervivientes on Telecinco. Lara has repeated her role as presenter in the following 6 editions of the survival contest.

From September 2015 she co-hosted Límite 48 horas of Gran Hermano from inside the house of Guadalix de la Sierra. In early 2016, it was announced that she would repeat as presenter of Supervivientes and in September of the same year she returned as co-presenter of Límite 48 horas of Gran Hermano 17. In early November 2016, it was confirmed that she would present with Carlos Sobera the New Year's Eve chimes from the Puerta del Sol in Madrid for Mediaset España.

In March 2017 she joined the programme Dani & Flo presented by Florentino Fernández y Dani Martinez on Cuatro. In August of the same year, it was announced her incorporation to the program as a new presenter. In 2019, it was announced her incorporation as presenter of the international contest Juegos sin fronteras, along with Joaquín Prat, broadcast on Telecinco in 2020. That same year she co-presents the second edition of the game show La casa fuerte, also on Telecinco.

In 2021, she debuted in music with the song "Juntos somos más", together with Beatriz Luengo and Yotuel Romero for the Euro 2020 on Mediaset.

== Trajectory ==
=== Television ===
Year	Program	Channel	Role
2006	Hoy por ti	Telemadrid	Editor and contributor
2009	Ahorro y finanzas	TeleAsturias	Host
2010	Marca gol	MARCA TV	Host
2010	Animax Comandos	Animax	Reporter
2010–2011	La Sexta Deportes	La Sexta	Host
2010–2011	Tiramillas	MARCA TV	Host
2011	Qué quieres que te diga	Cuatro	Contributor
2011–2012	Deportes Cuatro	Cuatro	Host
2012–2013	Mundial MotoGP	Telecinco	Host
2013–2014	Jugones	La Sexta	Host
2014	Espejo público	Antena 3	Contributor
2014	En el aire	La Sexta	Contributor
2014	Ilustres Ignorantes	Movistar+	Guest
2015	Todo va bien	Cuatro	Host
2015–2021	Supervivientes	Telecinco	Host
2015–2016	Gran Hermano	Telecinco	Host
2016–2017	Campanadas de fin de año	Telecinco	Host
2016–2019, 2023	Gran Hermano VIP	Telecinco	Host
2017	Mi casa es la tuya	Telecinco	Guest
2017–2018	Dani&Flo	Cuatro	Host
2018	Planeta Calleja	Cuatro	Guest
2018–2019	Campanadas de fin de año	Telecinco	Host
2020	Juegos sin fronteras	Telecinco	Host
2020	La casa fuerte	Telecinco	Host
2021	Secret Story: La casa de los secretos	Telecinco	Host
2021–2022	Galas de Nochebuena y Nochevieja	Telecinco	Host
2022	Idol Kids	Telecinco	Host
2024	Gran Hermano Dúo 2	Telecinco	Host

== Discography ==
- «Amo a Laura» (2006) with Los Happiness for Tiempo BBDO's advertising campaign for para MTV España.
- «Juntos somos más» (2021) with Beatriz Luengo and Yotuel Romero, Mediaset's anthem for the Euro 2020.

== Awards and nominations ==
Spanish Academy of Television Arts and Sciences Awards

Year	Category	Work	Result
2018	Best entertainment presenter	Supervivientes 2018	Nominated

Cosmopolitan Awards

Year	Category	Work	Result
2017	TV Star Award	Dani&Flo con Lara Álvarez	Won
