= Jorge Javier Vázquez =

Spanish television presenter, writer and actor

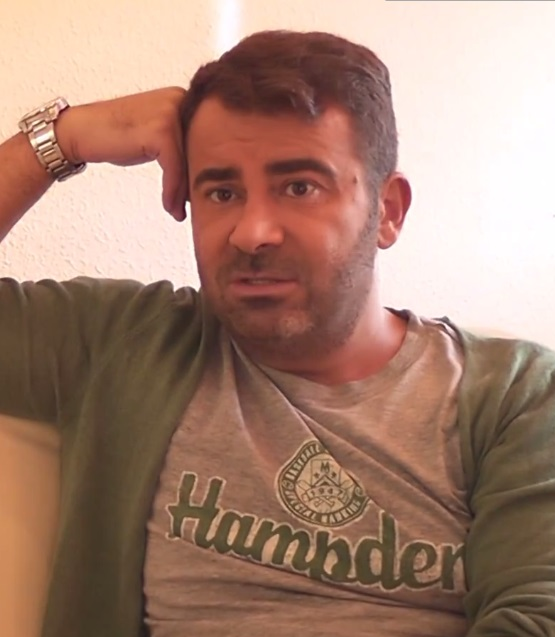
- Vázquez in 2013
- Born: Jorge Javier Vázquez Morales; 25 July 1970 (age 56); Badalona, Catalonia, Spain
- Occupations: Television presenter, writer, actor
- Notable work: Host or co-host of: Gran Hermano VIP; Sálvame; Survivor Spain; Sábado Deluxe

Jorge Javier Vázquez Morales (born 25 July 1970) is a Spanish television presenter, writer and actor.

== Early life and beginnings ==
Vázquez was born in the Sant Roc district of Badalona, Catalonia, Spain. His mother María Morales Martínez hails from Alcaraz, Castilla-La Mancha, and his father from Cieza, Murcia. He has two sisters, Ana and Esther.

Vázquez graduated in Spanish language and literature from the University of Barcelona. At the age of 25, he moved to Madrid, where he worked as an editor for teen magazine Super Pop and celebrity and women's magazine Pronto.

== Career and other ==
=== Television ===
In 1997, Vázquez began appearing in the Antena 3 show Extra Rosa, hosted by Rosa Villacastín and Ana Rosa Quintana. The following year he joined talk show Sabor a ti and its summer version Sabor a verano as a celebrity news commentator. In 2001 he debuted as television host alongside Francine Gálvez in Rumore, rumore.

Vázquez left Antena 3 and moved to Telecinco, where he began to appear as a panelist in the morning television show Día a día, hosted by María Teresa Campos. On 24 March 2003 he began to present, alongside Carmen Alcayde, the show that took him to stardom, Aquí hay tomate, which focused on tabloid stories and the world of celebrities. The daily show lasted until 1 February 2008 with high ratings but it drew criticism for sensationalism. In 2007 he also hosted Hormigas blancas, a show that revised the personal trajectory of a celebrity each episode.

After a hiatus of some months, Vázquez reinstated to Telecinco in September 2008 as the presenter of the daily highlights and the weekly debate show of the tenth season of Gran Hermano (Big Brother).

In March 2009, he began to host late night show Sálvame, a side show of Supervivientes: Perdidos en Honduras (sixth season of Survivor Spain) where the highlights of the reality show were debated. Due to its high ratings, it became a daily afternoon show titled Sálvame diario, converted into a talk show that focuses in the world of celebrities: the private lives of the television personalities cast in the show as panelists, or colaboradores to use the Spanish term, are often discussed. The show that has been characterised as telebasura or tabloid television attracts a large audience. Jorge Javier Vázquez and Paz Padilla alternate as hosts. A weekly late-night version of the show, Sálvame Golfo, was created, shortly after moved to prime time as Sálvame Deluxe.

On 16 October 2009, Vázquez received the Ondas Award for Best Television Presenter, according to the jury "for renovating with brilliance and sense the role of the presenter in a controversial genre". The award generated controversy, and Carles Francino, who had the duty of handing out the award in the ceremony, refused to do so and was replaced by Arturo Valls.

On 31 December 2009, Vázquez hosted the New Year's Eve special broadcast for Telecinco from Madrid's Puerta del Sol, along with Belén Esteban. Two years later, Vázquez repeated as host along with singer Isabel Pantoja and her son Kiko Rivera.

In May 2011, Vázquez became the main host of Supervivientes: Perdidos en Honduras (eighth season of Survivor Spain). It was the most watched season of the series in Spain. Vázquez repeated as host in the ninth (2014), tenth (2015), eleventh (2016), twelfth (2017), thirteenth (2018) and fourteenth (2019) seasons. Due to the success of Supervivientes, Vázquez hosted Acorralados (Spanish third season of The Farm) in 2011.

From April 2012 to March 2014, Vázquez hosted the first three seasons of Hay una cosa que te quiero decir, as well as the fifth season from November 2014 to February 2015. In September 2015, he hosted makeover show Cámbiame Premium, which was cancelled after three weeks due to poor ratings.

In 2016, Vázquez joined Got Talent España as one of the four judges, and was part of the panel for three seasons. In September 2016, Vázquez became the main host of Gran Hermano on its seventeenth season. He was likewise the host of its eighteenth regular season (2017), the sixth season of Gran Hermano VIP (2018), and the first season of Gran Hermano Dúo (2019).

In 2023, after the cancellation of Sálvame and Deluxe, Vázquez was announced as the host of new weeknight chat show Cuentos chinos, widely perceived to be Telecinco's response to El Hormiguero.

=== Other media ===
As of 2018, Vázquez has written two novels. On 8 November 2012, he published an autobiographical novel titled La vida iba en serio. On 22 September 2015, a second autobiographical novel, titled Último verano de juventud, was released.

In 2014 Vázquez ventured into theatre production with the musical Miguel de Molina al desnudo, which premiered at the Teatro Echegaray in Málaga on 3 October 2014. In 2015, Vázquez debuted as a theatre actor as the lead in Iba en serio, the musical adaptation of his first autobiographical novel, which premiered at the Teatro Cervantes in Málaga on 4 September 2015. In 2018, he starred in the musical Grandes éxitos.

In film, Vázquez was one of the producers of the 2017 musical comedy film Holy Camp!.

== Personal life ==
Vázquez is openly gay.
