= Cayos Cochinos =

Archipelago off northern Honduras

Nickname: Hog Islands
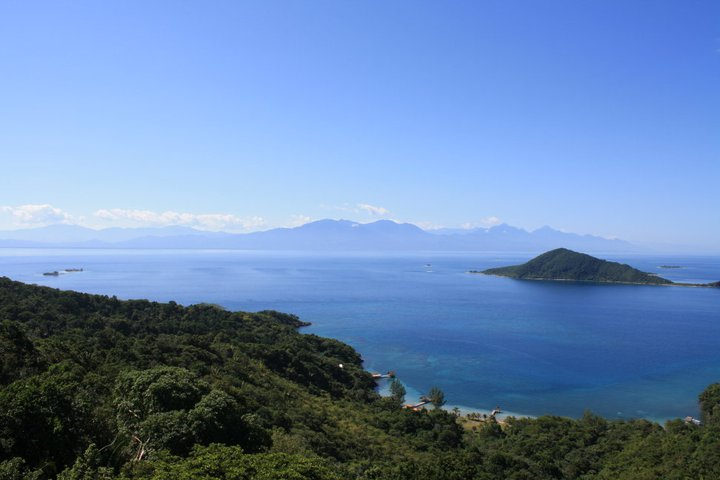
- View from lighthouse facing southwest

- Location within Honduras Location within the Caribbean

Geography
- Location: Caribbean Sea
- Coordinates: 15°58′18.99″N 86°28′31.34″W
- Archipelago: Bay Islands
- Total islands: 15
- Major islands: 2
- Area: 2 km^{2} (0.77 sq mi)

Administration
- Honduras
- Department: Bay Islands
- Municipality: Islas de la Bahía

Demographics
- Population: 108
- Pop. density: 54/km^{2} (140/sq mi)
- Ethnic groups: Garifuna

The Cayos Cochinos or Cochinos Cays consist of two small islands (Cayo Menor and Cayo Grande) and 13 smaller coral cays situated 30 kilometres (19 mi; 16 nmi) northeast of La Ceiba on the northern shores of Honduras. Although geographically separate, they belong to the Bay Islands department and are part of the Roatán municipality. The population numbered 108 at the 2001 census. The total land area measures about 2 km^{2} (0.8 sq mi).

The islands are a Marine Protected Area and are managed by the Honduras Coral Reef Foundation. The coral reef here is part of the world's second largest coral reef system known as the Meso-American Barrier Reef. There is a scientific research station on Cayo Menor, the smaller of the two main islands in the system.

National Geographic writes, "The waters around this collection of coral cays are a marine biologist's dream: protected by the government, off-limits to commercial divers and fishermen, and busy with creatures that may not yet have names."

== Tourism ==
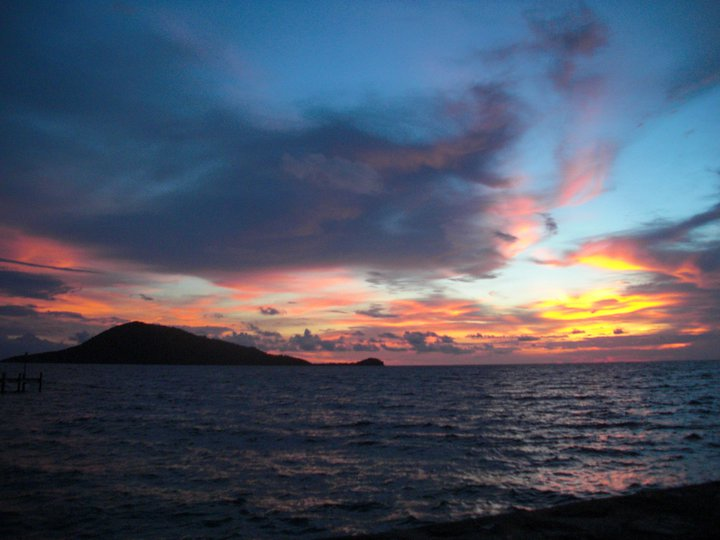
Sunset from the Plantation Beach Resort patio

The Cayos Cochinos have no roads, cars or bikes. There is a hiking trail that connects residences and beaches on Cayo Grande. There is a lighthouse on the highest point of the island which can be hiked to through scenic jungles and which are home to the only pink boas in the world. The only inhabitants of the islands are Garifuna fishing villages (Chachahuete and East End), nine private homes on Cayo Grande, and six homes on the 13 smaller cays. The islands are accessible by boat from La Ceiba or by sailboat charter departing from Utila or Roatán.

The actions taken in preserving the underwater environment has left the Cayos Cochinos' waters as the healthiest and most pristine marine life in the Bay Islands. The Honduras Coral Reef Fund is responsible for upholding the environmental restrictions and protecting the marine park, and collect a park entrance fee from all those who enter.

Both Garifuna villages offer cheap lodging for backpackers who wish to stay in either East End or Chachahuete in hammocks or hostel-like huts.

== Transport ==
The Cayos Cochinos are accessible from Roatán via charter company. Smaller boats also leave from La Ceiba, Sambo Creek, Nueva Armenia and from dive shops in Utila. There are daily trips from La Ceiba as well as Cayos Cochinos Divers / Pirate Islands Divers, which also offers scuba diving day and overnight trips.

== Conservation ==
Established as a key area of the Mesoamerican Barrier Reef System, the Cayos and the surrounding waters were declared a marine reserve in 1994, with the help of the Smithsonian Institution, in order to protect all marine and terrestrial flora and fauna within a 460 km^{2} (180 sq mi) zone. The reserve extends 8 kilometres (5 mi) in all directions. Laws prohibit all commercial fishing, netting, and trapping within the marine park. Local Garifuna are permitted to fish with hand lines, but prohibited from netting and spearfishing. In designated areas, there is a lobster diving season for qualified Garifuna fishermen. Since 1994, the Smithsonian Institution, World Wildlife Fund (WWF), Honduras Coral Reef Fund, Operation Wallacea and other non-profit organizations have helped preserve the natural beauty of the area.

=== Important Bird Area ===
The islands are part of the Islas de la Bahía y Cayos Cochinos Important Bird Area (IBA), designated as such by BirdLife International because they support significant populations of white-crowned pigeons, chimney swifts and yellow-naped amazons.
