= Yola Berrocal =

Spanish actress and singer

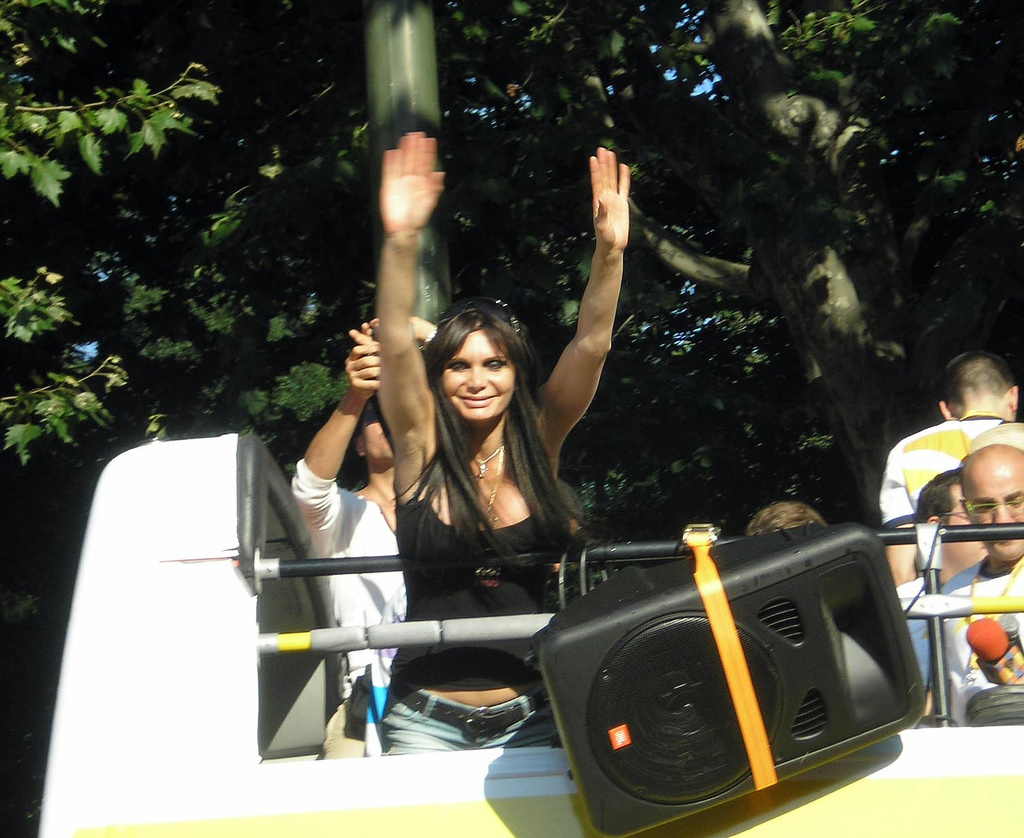
- Berrocal in 2005
- Born: Yolanda del Prado Pascual Berrocal; 15 September 1970 (age 55); Ciudad Real, Spain
- Occupations: Actress; singer; dancer
- Height: 1.76 m (5.8 ft)

Yolanda del Prado Pascual Berrocal (born 15 September 1970), better known as Yola Berrocal, is a Spanish media personality who has worked as a dancer, singer and actress.

== Biography ==
The daughter of mining engineer Manuel Pascual and decorator María del Rosario Berrocal, Yola Berrocal grew up in Pozuelo de Alarcón in Madrid, and studied Dramatic Art. Her first appearance on television was in 1994 on the show ¿Cómo lo veis? presented by Joaquín Prat, where she went with her family as a contestant. In 1997 she appeared as a dancer on the José Luis Moreno program Risas y estrellas.

After proclaiming herself to be the girlfriend of Padre Apeles, who was then the center of interest of the telebasura, she appeared on the cover of Interviú magazine in March 1998. In 2001, she formed the musical group Sex Bomb along with Malena Gracia and Sonia Monroy. In 2003 she participated in the Telecinco reality show Hotel Glam and won. She is frequently featured in gossip magazines. She has undergone several breast augmentation operations.

In February 2006, Berrocal again appeared on the cover of Interviú, with the headline "I am going to put big tits in fashion in Spain." In the summer of that year she presented herself as a candidate for the mayorship of Marbella, creating the Yola Independiente Liberal (YIL) party, with the slogan "Marbella, because Yola is worth it." Santiago Segura hired her in 2007 to work as a contributor to his program Sabías a lo que venías on LaSexta, where once a week she gave her personal opinion about books that she had previously read. She appeared on Sálvame in June 2009.

In 2012 she formed a new musical group, Atrevidas, with Sonia Monroy, whose best-known song was a cover of Sabrina's "Boys (Summertime Love)". Since then she has worked as an image girl in nightclubs and announced mobile games through her Twitter account.

She has worked as an assistant to Santiago Segura, contributing to several series and almost 60 television programs. On 11 April 2016, she was announced as a contestant of Supervivientes, where she reached 2nd place in the final.

In 2004, Antonio Ortega used her image for one of his unusual projects, which constituted of opening an office during an exhibition at the Fundació Joan Miró to obtain funds from companies in order to reproduce his wax figure.

== Filmography ==
=== Films ===
Year	Title	Character	Notes
1996	Te lo mereces	Yola	Short film
1997	Corazón loco	Yola	Supporting role
1997	Airbag	Woman	Minor role
1998	Atómica	Super India	Minor role
2001	Torrente 2: Misión en Marbella	Lulú	Supporting role
2011	Torrente 4: Lethal Crisis	Poster girl	Minor role
2017	Cosmética Terror	Nurse Peterson	Leading role

=== Fiction TV series ===
Year	Title	Character	Notes
1996	Maravillas 10 y pico	Amante	1 episode
1999	Puerta con puerta	Yola	1 episode

=== Other TV series ===
Year	Title	Role
1997–1998	Risas y estrellas	
2000–2002	Mamma mía	Contributor/Yoleitor
2002–2003	Esta es mi historia	Contributor
2003	Crónicas marcianas	Contributor
2005–2006	A tu lado	Reporter
2007	Oh la la	Reporter and contributor
2007	Sabías a lo que venías	Reporter and contributor
2009–2013	Sálvame	Contributor
2009–2013	Vuélveme loca	Reporter
2010	La noria	Contributor
2010–2011	Resistiré, ¿vale?	Contributor
2016	Hable con ellas en Telecinco	Guest
2018–present	Cazamariposas	Contributor

=== Reality shows ===
Year	Title	Channel	Result
2003	Hotel Glam	Telecinco	Winner
2011	El Reencuentro	Telecinco	Winner
2016	Supervivientes	Telecinco	2nd finalist
2017	Supervivientes	Telecinco	Contributor
2020	La casa fuerte	Telecinco	Winner

== Discography ==
=== With Sex Bomb ===
- Ven (2003 album)
1. "Si llama, dile que he salido"
2. "Armas de mujer"
3. "Ven, ven, ven"
4. "De mí te olvidaras"
5. "Lloré tu ausencia"
6. "Dance"
7. "Cómeme"
8. "Pegando fuerte"
9. "If You Love Me"
10. "Sin tu amor"

=== With Atrevidas ===
- "Boys (Summertime Love)"

=== Solo albums ===
- Hotel Glam
- Aquí hay tomate
