= Leticia Sabater =

Spanish television presenter and singer

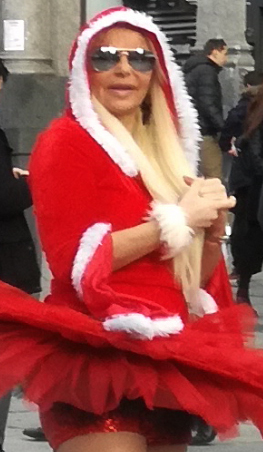
- Sabater in 2018
- Born: Leticia María Sabater Alonso; 21 June 1966 (age 60); Barcelona, Spain
- Spouse: José María Fernández-Mayo (m. 2001; div. 2002)
- Parent(s): Jorge Sabater de Sabatés; María del Carmen Alonso Martínez-Cobo of Guzmán

Leticia María Sabater Alonso (born in Barcelona, 21 June 1966) is a Spanish television presenter, actress and singer, who became known in the 1990s for her work in children's programming.

== Biography ==
=== Family ===
She is the second of three daughters of the marriage between mining engineer Jorge Sabater de Sabatés (1933–2024 at the age of 91 years) and his wife María del Carmen Alonso Martínez-Cobo of Guzmán (1944–2010 at the age of 66 years). Her sisters' names are Silvia (1963–2020 at the age of 57 years) and Casilda (b. 1970).

=== Televisión Española (TVE) (1986–1991) ===
Her debut in front of the cameras was in 1986 as "chica de figuración" in the program Un, dos, tres... responda otra vez. Later, she would appear as a hostess during the Vuelta a España alongside Gina o Lore. In 1989, she became a "chica Hermida" when she was joined Por la mañana, the program hosted by Jesús Hermida on Televisión Española.

In April 1990 she had the opportunity to present her first children's programming, No te lo pierdas ("Don't miss it"), with Enrique Simón. No te lo pierdas filled the gap in the programming left by Cajón desastre ("Grab bag"), by Miriam Díaz Aroca, and it remained on the air for a year. The show's representation changed the stereotypes of children's programs, since, according to some, its hosts had a cooler, more casual tone.

This same year she began a musical career with the launch of the single Tu vecina favorita, which was about the subject of the same name, and the song En tu casa o en la mía. The songs reached the 14th and 36th slots, respectively, in the list of Los 40 Principales. A year later, she recorded the children's album Nosotros somos el mundo ("We are the world"), with collaborations with stars like Marco and Sabater's previous co-stars Gina and Lore. Her second album, a younger cut, launched in 1993 under the title Leticia; in 1994 her third album, Leti Funk, came out. Her last album was Con Mucha Marcha, in 1997, which contained versions of classic children's songs like "la canción del colacao".

In 1991 she had a small experience interpreting on the Mariano Ozores series Taller mecánico.

=== Telecinco (1991–1995) ===
In September of that year she was signed by Telecinco and began one of her periods of greater popularity as a presenter of children's programs: Desayuna con alegría (1991–1993) y A mediodía, alegría (1992–1993), and Vivan los compis (1992).

She combined this work with other projects for the network, like Mañana serán estrellas (1993), with Carmen Sevilla and Manolo Escobar, and Campeones de la playa (1994).

Simultaneously, she debuted in the theatre with Mejor en octubre (1994), by Santiago Moncada, with Arturo Fernández.

=== TVE (1995–1999) ===
In 1995 her contract with Telecinco ended and she returned to TVE, to present again in a space targeted to the youngest viewers: the contest Lo que hay que tener, which was followed the next season by the presentation of the children's programming block Con mucha marcha, which remained until 1999.

=== Channel 7 TV (2002–2004) ===
In 2002 she exchanged younger audiences for adult ones when she joined the local Madrid network Canal 7, to present the show Mentiras peligrosas, which would follow the dancing show Danubio Azul and the game show Tu segunda luna de miel (later called De hecho Pareja). She also had a children's spot, Merienda with Leticia. She left Canal 7 in 2004.

=== Latest projects ===
At that point, she left the world of television and continued making theatrical shows for children. In December 2001 she staged The Wizard of Oz, playing the lead role of Dorita (Dorothy Gale). In 2005 she also took part in the show 5 lesbianas.com, alongside Vania Millán, Jenny Llada, Cristina Goyanes and .

Since then she has participated as a contestant in the reality shows La selva de los famosos (2004) on Antena 3, Esta cocina es un infierno (2006) on Telecinco, ¡Mira quién baila! (Christmas edition) (2006–2007) on TVE and Acorralados (2011) on Telecinco, in addition to her brief participation on El castillo de las mentes prodigiosas (2004) and Hotel Glam (2003).

In 2007 she contributed to the Telecinco program TNT.

In 2007, she starred alongside Marta Valverde, Rosa Valenty and Cecilia Sarli in the theatrical show Sexo en Nueva York, which opened on 10 August in the Palacio de Congresos de Santander, and later played Samantha Jones in Valladolid from 11 – 13 September.

She had a small role in the Emilio Martínez Lázaro film Las 13 rosas.

In 2009 she appeared once more for Telecinco in the program Sálvame. On 24 November 2010, she appeared again, this time in the magazine program SLQH (La Sexta) to comment on videos she had appeared in, both ads and programming.

In 2011 she announced a new album for an adult audience, with its first song being version of Laura Pausini's "Se fue". She appeared on the first program (04/07/2011) of No le digas a mamá que trabajó en la tele, as well as in Otra movida (Antena 3 Neox) in August 2011. On 7 September 2011, she appeared on the Telecinco program Sálvame to confirm her participation in the reality show Acorralados. In addition, she was subjected to the controversial television therapy session known as "The Box Deluxe 4D" of the Telecinco program Sálvame Deluxe, which premiered while she was a contestant on Acorralados. After 35 days, she was the fifth contestant on Acorralados to be expelled.

In the first week of July 2012 the magazine Interviú ran a feature about her. In 2013 she was a contestant on the Cuatro reality show Expedición imposible.

In 2024, she appeared as a guest during the mini-challenge of the fourth episode of Drag Race España season 4

== Work ==
=== Cinema ===
- Simple Mortal (1996)
- Las 13 rosas (2007)
- Paraíso Club (short) (2008)

=== Series ===
- Lorca, muerte de un poeta (1987) Chica fiesta.
- Taller mecánico (1991) Clara García "Capitular".
- La antorcha encendida (1996) Joaquina "Capitular".
- Canciones de amor (1997) Valeria "Capitular".

=== Theatre ===
- Mejor en octubre (1994/1995)
- Diversos espectáculos infantiles (1999/2001)
- El Mago de Oz (2001/2002)
- 5lesbianas.com (2005/2006)
- Sexo en Nueva York (2007/2008)
- Había una vez un circo (2012/2014)
- Fronze (2015/2016)

=== Singer ===
- "Tu vecina favorita" (single, 1990) containing "Tú vecina favorita" y "En tu casa o en la mía"
- Nosotros somos el mundo (1991, children's album) +30.000 copies. Contains the hit "Leti Rap"
- Leticia (1993, second album) Produced by Pablo Pinilla. Contains the first adaptation into Castilian Spanish of "La Solitudine" by Laura Pausini
- Leti Funk (1994, third album) Contains songs like "Leti funk", "Mágico" y "Polos opuestos".
- Con mucha marcha (1997, children's album from the program Mucha Marcha)
- Canciones de Guardería (2010, re-release of Con mucha marcha)
- "Se fue" (2011, Sencillo) Cover of popular song by Laura Pausini
- "Mr. Policeman" (2012, Sencillo) Dance
- "Yo quiero fiesta" (2013, Sencillo) Dance
- "Universo Gay" (2014, Sencillo) Dance
- "YMCA" (2015, Sencillo) Versión
- "La salchipapa" (2016, Sencillo)
- "¡¡¡Toma Pepinazo!!!" (2017, Sencillo)
- “Polvorron” (2018, Sencillo)
- “18 Centímetros, Papi” (2018, Sencillo)

=== Contributor ===
- Un, dos, tres... responda otra vez (1986/1987) Extra.
- Por la mañana (1987/1989) Contributor.
- Vamos a montar el Belén (1994) Performer.
- TNT (2005/2007) Contributor.
- Sálvame Deluxe (2013) Her own segment, looking for a date.

=== Presenter ===
- (1990) – No te lo pierdas
- (1991–1993) – Desayuna con alegría (Telecinco)
- (1991) – Circo, humor y fantasía (Telecinco)
- (1992) – Vivan los compis
- (1992–1993) – A mediodía, alegría (Telecinco)
- (1993) – Mañana serán estrellas
- (1993) – Gala "Unidos contra la droga"
- (1994) – Campeones de la playa
- (1995–1996) – Lo que hay que tener (TVE)
- (1996–1999) – Mucha marcha (TVE)
- (2002–2003) – Mentiras peligrosas (Canal 7 TV)
- (2003) – Danubio azul
- (2004) – Tu segunda luna de miel
- (2004) – Merienda con Leticia
- (2014) – Cazamariposas VIP

=== Reality Shows ===
Year	Reality	Role	Result
2004	La Selva de los FamoS.O.S.	Contestant	11th eliminated
2006	Esta cocina es una infierno	Contestant	1st eliminated
2011	Acorralados	Contestant	5th eliminated
2013	Expedición Imposible: El Reino de Marruecos	Contestant with Raquel Mosquera	1st eliminateds
2017	Supervivientes: Perdidos en Honduras (2017)	Contestant	4th eliminated
2020	La Casa Fuerte	Contestant with Yola Berrocal	Winners
