= Fominaya =

Fominaya is a surname. Notable people with the surname include:

- Antonio Fominaya (1769–?), Colombian soldier and politician
- Eloy Fominaya (1925–2002), American contemporary composer, music educator, conductor, violinist, and luthier
- Silvia Fominaya (born 1975), Spanish model, actress, and presenter
