= Moros y cristianos (TV programme) =

- Genre: Debate show
- Presented by: Xavier Sardà (1997); Jordi González (1997-98); Antxón Urrosolo (2001)
- Country of origin: Spain
- Original language: Spanish
- No. of seasons: 3

Production
- Running time: 180 minutes

Original release
- Network: Telecinco
- Release: February 15, 1997 – November 17, 2001

Moros y cristianos (English: Moors and Christians) is a Spanish television debate programme that was broadcast on Telecinco between 1997 and 2001.

== Format ==
Broadcast live from the auditorium of the city of Cornellà de Llobregat, Catalonia, two groups of participants debated the week's current affairs, for three hours.

In December 1997, it organised a 24-hour charity debate in aid of Ayuda en Acción, a charity which helps the most vulnerable in South America, and the Vicente Ferrer Foundation, which helps those in need in India. It won an average audience share of 19%, peaking at 66.3% and with 3,000,000 viewers. The event won the show the Guinness World Record for the longest televised debate.

== Presenters ==
The show's three series had as many hosts. In the first series, from its premiere until 29 July 1997, the programme was hosted by Javier Sardà until he left to present Crónicas marcianas which outlived Moros y cristianos by four years. From 27 September the programme returned, this time hosted by Jordi González. After the end of this series, the show went on hiatus until it returned in 2001, now presented by Antxón Urrosolo. It was finally cancelled after this series.

== Regular contributors ==
Regular guests who achieved fame thanks to Moros y cristianos included Padre Apeles, Javier Nart, Santiago Segura, Juan Adriansens, Alfonso Cabeza, the singer Ramoncín, Lucía Etxebarría, Karina Fálagan, Aramís Fuster, the actor Pepe Sancho and the comedienne Carmen García Ribas.
