= Hora punta =

- Genre: Comedy; Talk show
- Presented by: Javier Cárdenas
- Country of origin: Spain
- Original language: Spanish

Production
- Producer: RTVE
- Running time: 20-45 minutes

Original release
- Network: La 1
- Release: October 10, 2016 – July 3, 2018

Hora punta (English: Rush Hour) is a Spanish television talk show focused on contemporary issues and presented with a generally humorous tone. First broadcast on October 10, 2016, it aired Monday through Thursday during prime time on channel La 1 of Televisión Española. The show was cancelled in July 2018, amid concerns about sexism in its tone, and the quality of information presented.

== History ==
Hora punta premiered in October 2016, produced by Joue Consultants, the production company of Javier Cárdenas, who in addition to producing the program is also responsible for presenting it. Cárdenas was previously a well-known radio announcer who also had numerous television projects since the 1990s, when he participated in programs like Crónicas marcianas and Al ataque. In Hora punta, Cárdenas hosted the show and produced the primary interviews, while other segments of the program were presented by his team of collaborators, Alejandra Castelló, Tony Martínez, Alberto Peñarroya and Albert Lesán. Segments include humorous videos, magic tricks, unknown talents, paranormal phenomena, tests of difficulty and bets among the members of the program. In addition, Hora punta gradually incorporated other regular collaborators, such as Àlex Casademunt, Esmeralda Moya or Melani Olivares, who also often take part in interviews with celebrities (actors, journalists, sportsmen, singers, etc.) who visit the program. Hora punta competed with the last part of El Intermedio (laSexta), with First Dates (Cuatro) and with the most seen program of this time slot, El hormiguero of Antena 3.

After the program's first several months, the board of directors of RTVE gave a green light a new batch of episodes of Hora punta. The show, which started in October 2016 with an average share of 11.1%, then slid to around 8-9%, below the average for the network. Despite the low audience figures, the board renewed the program for this time slot, with votes against by councilors Miguel Ángel Sacaluga (PSOE), Teresa Aranguren (IU), while Óscar Pierre (CiU) abstained, while calling for changes to improve the program. The remaining councilors, all with the PP, supported the show, noting that some executives like network director Eladio Jareño, have shown their confidence in the product.

At the end of May 2018, the program was renewed for a new season as a weekly late night show instead of a daily show, while more than tripling budget from 40,000 to 150,000 euros, a renewal that received various criticisms. On 28 August 2018 the management of TVE, after the change in the presidency of RTVE, cancelled of the program, reporting that would be replaced by a new Raquel Sánchez-Silva family entertainment program. Cárdenas announced that he was studying the possibility of taking legal actions over the cancellation.

== Criticism ==
Álvaro P. Ruiz of El País dismisses the program as "insufferable", adding that most of the "alleged news" they comment on is "vain, superficial, not interesting".

On several occasions the program has given voice to both practitioners of false therapies, such as morphopsychology, as well as to conspiracy theorists who associate autism with vaccination, or the so-called chemtards - "chemtraileros", in Spanish, who assert that hurricanes are created and manipulated artificially to make them more destructive.

The show has also been denounced on several occasions for sexist content in the control commission of RTVE of the Spanish Parliament, where it has been questioned whether it is an appropriate program for the broadcast of a public television.
