= Carmen de Mairena =

Spanish television personality

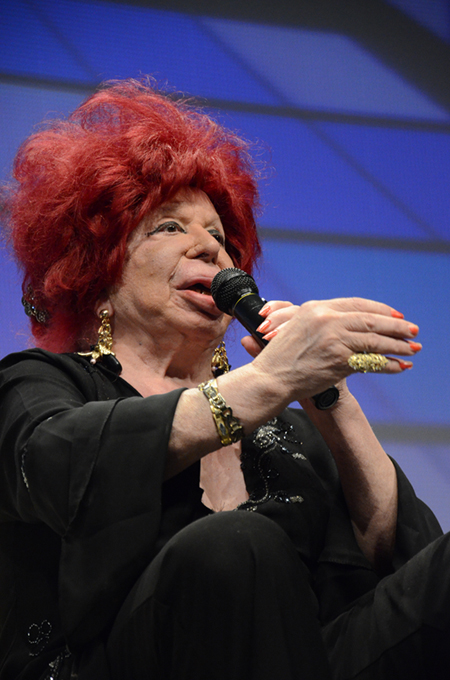
- Carmen de Mairena in 2012
- Born: Miguel Brau Gou; 15 March 1933; Barcelona, Spain
- Died: 22 March 2020 (aged 87); El Raval, Barcelona, Spain
- Occupations: Cuplé singer; actress; sex worker; television personality; politician
- Political party: Coordinadora Reusenca Independent

Carmen de Mairena (born Miguel Brau Gou; 15 March 1933 – 22 March 2020) was a Spanish cuplé singer and popular television personality from Barcelona. Known as Miguel de Mairena until 1993, Carmen came out as a trans woman in 1978, which led to a decline in her artistic career and her working as a prostitute for years. In the 1990s, she gained national popularity for her comedic television appearances alongside presenter Javier Cárdenas, who has linked her to the self-described "freaky" world. Also, she made occasional incursions in the world of the cinema, even the pornographic one.

== Biography ==
=== Early years ===
Carmen de Mairena was born Miguel Brau Gou on March 15, 1933, in Barcelona, Spain. In 1959, she debuted as a variety artist in various venues in Barcelona allowing her to gain some fame as a cuplé singer. She had a sentimental relationship with singer Pedrito Rico, which made the Francoist regime detain them many times. In the 1960s, due to the mistreatment suffered in prison, she developed an illness that prevented her from working in show business for a year. During this period she worked as a laborer with her father in Gavà. After recovering, she acted together with other cupletistas of the time such as Antonio Amaya, Miguel de los Reyes, Pedrito Rico and Tomás de Antequera.

=== Transition and television fame ===
In June 1978, she announced her intention to transition into a woman. She began presenting as a woman and received liquid silicone injections (done clandestinely) in her face, chest and hips, and she appeared in cross-dressing shows under the name Carmen de Mairena, in which she impersonated Sara Montiel and Marujita Díaz. This was not well received by her public, which prompted her to work as a prostitute in El Raval, where she lived a good portion of her life. During the 1990s, she met then-interviewer Javier Cárdenas and she started a television career with him on shows such as Al ataque and Crónicas marcianas.

In November 2006 and October 2008, she was detained in two macro-operations in El Raval against procuring networks that forced Romanian women to practice prostitution. Carmen de Mairena was the only one of those arrested who was released, on both occasions, since there was no risk of escape. She was accused of favoring prostitution for renting rooms in her house for prostitutes to work there, earning cash for each service. After that, she appeared sporadically on television, for example, in 2009 in the comedy program El intermedio where she played a mock impersonation of Francisco Franco. She also made a brief incursion in politics in 2010 as a candidate for the Parliament of Catalonia for the mock political party Coordinadora Reusenca Independent (CORI) which did not obtain any seats.

=== Death ===
Carmen retired in 2015 and moved to a care home; her health deteriorated and she became reliant on a wheelchair. In January 2016, after she had moved to the nursing home, many of her belongings were found in a garbage container near her former house. She died on March 22, 2020, at a hospital in Barcelona.
