= La Isla de los FamoS.O.S. 2 =

- Season 2
- Presented by: Nuria Roca
- No. of days: 50
- No. of castaways: 17
- Winner: Felipe López
- Runner-up: María Pineda
- Location: Samaná, Dominican Republic
- No. of episodes: 16

Release
- Original network: Antena 3
- Original release: May 7 – June 25, 2003

Season chronology
- ← Previous; La Isla de los FamoS.O.S. 1 Next → La Selva de los FamoS.O.S.

La Isla de los FamoS.O.S. 2 is the second season of the show La Isla de los FamoS.O.S. and the fourth season of Supervivientes to air in Spain. It was broadcast on Antena 3 from May 7, 2003, to June 25, 2003. This season took place in the Dominican Republic.

== Season summary ==
Along with some of the twists introduced in the previous season, this season the sixteen contestants (seventeen when Fayna Bethencourt entered the game to replace Silvia Fominaya) were divided into two tribes called Macorix and Yamasá. When the tribes merged into the Cana'n following the sixth elimination there were only ten contestants left in the game. Along with this, all eliminations and nominations this season (and all seasons following) were live. Ultimately, it was swimmer Felipe López who won this season over model María Pineda and took home the €200,000 grand prize.

== Finishing order ==
Contestant	Famous for	Original tribe	Merge tribe	Finish
Nacho Sierra; 33, Madrid	Television panelist	Yamasá		1st Voted Out; Day 4
Pilar Soto; 25, Madrid	Actress and television host	Yamasá		2nd Voted Out; Day 6
Silvia Fominaya; 26, Madrid	Actress	Macorix		Left Competition; Day 6
Asdrúbal Ametller; 26, La Habana	Model	Macorix		3rd Voted Out; Day 10
Alejandra Grepi; 41, Madrid	Actress	Macorix		4th Voted Out; Day 13
Fayna Bethencourt; 25, Las Palmas	Gran Hermano 2 housemate	Macorix		5th Voted Out; Day 17
Elsa Anka; 37, Barcelona	Television host	Yamasá		6th Voted Out; Day 20
Isaac Vidjrakou; 25, Barcelona	Mister Spain 2002	Macorix	Cana'n	7th Voted Out; Day 24
Jeannette Rodríguez; 41, Caracas	Actress and television host	Yamasá	Cana'n	8th Voted Out; Day 27
Jorge Salati; 38, Buenos Aires	Model	Macorix	Cana'n	9th Voted Out; Day 31
Paco Vegara; 41, Cádiz	Actor and television host	Macorix	Cana'n	10th Voted Out; Day 35
Coral Bistuer; 38, Madrid	Olympic taekwondo medalist	Yamasá	Cana'n	11th Voted Out; Day 38
Vania Millán; 25, Madrid	Miss Spain 2002	Macorix	Cana'n	12th Voted Out; Day 42
Santiago Urrialde; 37, Madrid	Comedian	Yamasá	Cana'n	13th Voted Out; Day 46
Marc Ostarcevic; 61, Madrid	Former basketball player	Yamasá	Cana'n	14th Voted Out; Day 49
María Pineda; 42, Madrid	Dancer and model	Macorix	Cana'n	Runner-Up; Day 49
Felipe López; 25, Ferrol	Swimmer	Yamasá	Cana'n	Sole Survivor; Day 49

== Nominations table ==
	Round 1	Round 2	Round 3	Round 4	Round 5	Round 6	Round 7	Round 8	Round 9	Round 10	Round 11	Round 12	Round 13	Final	
Felipe	Pilar	Pilar	Immune	Immune	Immune	Elsa	Isaac	Vania	Jorge	Vania	Vania	Vania	Marc	Nominated	Sole Survivor (Day 49)
María	Immune	Immune	Asdrúbal	Alejandra	Fayna	Immune	Isaac	Marc	Coral	Coral	Coral	Santiago	Santiago	Finalist	Runner-Up (Day 49)
Marc	Pilar	Pilar	Immune	Immune	Immune	Elsa	Isaac	Jeannette	Vania	Vania	Vania	Vania; Felipe	Santiago	Nominated	Eliminated (Day 49)
Santiago	Pilar	Pilar	Immune	Immune	Immune	Elsa	Jeannette	Jeannette	Vania	Vania; Paco	Vania	Vania	María	Eliminated (Day 46)	
Vania	Immune	Immune	Asdrúbal	Alejandra	Fayna	Immune	Isaac	Marc	Jorge	Coral	Santiago	Santiago	Eliminated (Day 42)		
Coral	Pilar	Pilar	Immune	Immune	Immune	Elsa	Isaac	Jeannette	Vania	Vania	Vania	Eliminated (Day 38)			
Paco	Immune	Immune	Asdrúbal	Alejandra	Fayna	Immune	Isaac	Coral	Coral	Coral	Eliminated (Day 35)				
Jorge	Immune	Immune	Asdrúbal	Alejandra	Fayna	Immune	Isaac	Vania	Vania	Eliminated (Day 31)					
Jeannette	Nacho	Pilar	Immune	Immune	Immune	Santiago	Isaac	Coral	Eliminated (Day 27)						
Isaac	Immune	Immune	Asdrúbal	Alejandra	Jorge	Immune	Felipe	Eliminated (Day 24)							
Elsa	Pilar	Pilar	Immune	Immune	Immune	Jeannette	Eliminated (Day 20)								
Fayna	Not in the game			Isaac	Jorge	Eliminated (Day 17)									
Alejandra	Immune	Immune	Asdrúbal	Paco	Eliminated (Day 13)										
Asdrúbal	Immune	Immune	Alejandra	Eliminated (Day 10)											
Silvia	Immune	Immune	Left Competition (Day 6)												
Pilar	Nacho	Elsa	Eliminated (Day 6)												
Nacho	Pilar	Eliminated (Day 4)													
Nomination Notes	None						See note 1	See note 2	See note 3	See note 4	See note 5	See note 6	See note 7	See note 8	See note 9
Nominated by Tribe	Pilar	Pilar	Asdrúbal	Alejandra	Fayna	Elsa	Isaac	Jeannette	Vania	Vania	Vania	Vania	Santiago	None	
Nominated by Immune Tribe	Nacho	Coral	Jorge	Isaac	Isaac	Marc									
Nominated by Immune Player								Vania	Jorge	Paco	Coral	Felipe	Marc	None	
Nominated	Nacho; Pilar	Coral; Pilar	Asdrúbal; Jorge	Alejandra; Isaac	Fayna; Isaac	Elsa; Marc	Isaac; Santiago	Jeannette; Vania	Jorge; Vania	Paco; Vania	Coral; Vania	Felipe; Vania	Marc; Santiago	Felipe; Marc	Felipe; María
Eliminated	Nacho; 70% to eliminate	Pilar; 88.54% to eliminate	Asdrúbal; 69% to eliminate	Alejandra; 51.04% to eliminate	Fayna; 50.88% to eliminate	Elsa; 96% to eliminate	Isaac; 79% to eliminate	Jeannette; 75.78% to eliminate	Jorge; 69.76% to eliminate	Paco; 77.89% to eliminate	Coral; 64.98% to eliminate	Vania; 55.95% to eliminate	Santiago; 72.59% to eliminate	Marc; 61.96% to eliminate	María; 34.23% to win
Eliminated	Nacho; 70% to eliminate	Pilar; 88.54% to eliminate	Asdrúbal; 69% to eliminate	Alejandra; 51.04% to eliminate	Fayna; 50.88% to eliminate	Elsa; 96% to eliminate	Isaac; 79% to eliminate	Jeannette; 75.78% to eliminate	Jorge; 69.76% to eliminate	Paco; 77.89% to eliminate	Coral; 64.98% to eliminate	Vania; 55.95% to eliminate	Santiago; 72.59% to eliminate	Marc; 61.96% to eliminate	Felipe; 65.77% to win

- ^Note 1: Due to rule breaking, Santiago was automatically nominated for elimination during round eight.
- ^Note 2: As the winner of the immunity challenge, Felipe was given the power to name a second nominee.
- ^Note 3: As the winner of the immunity challenge, Felipe was given the power to name a second nominee.
- ^Note 4: As the winner of the immunity challenge, Santiago was given the power to name a second nominee and was forced to break the tie that occurred at the tenth tribal councils.
- ^Note 5: As the winner of the immunity challenge, María was given the power to name a second nominee.
- ^Note 6: As the winner of the immunity challenge, Marc was given the power to name a second nominee and was forced to break the tie that occurred at the twelfth tribal councils.
- ^Note 7: As the winner of the immunity challenge, Felipe was given the power to name a second nominee.
- ^Note 8: As they lost the final immunity challenge, Felipe and Marc were automatically nominated for elimination.
- ^Note 9: The lines were open to vote for the winner.
