= Pedrito Rico =

Spanish singer, actor and ballet dancer (1932–1988)

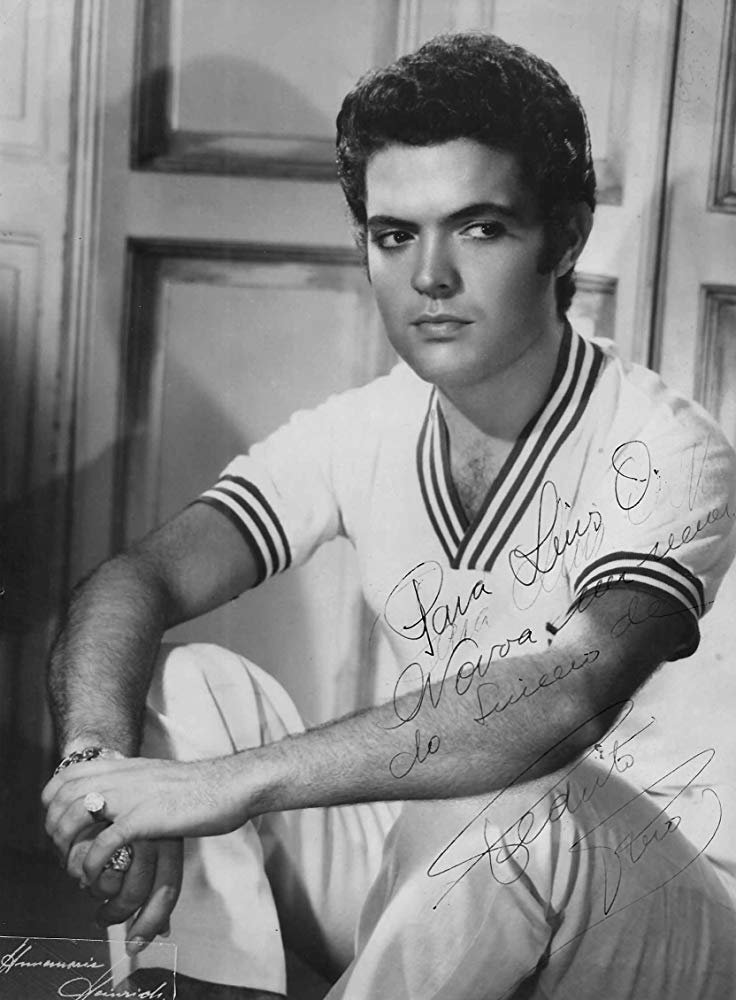
Pedrito Rico by Annemarie Heinrich

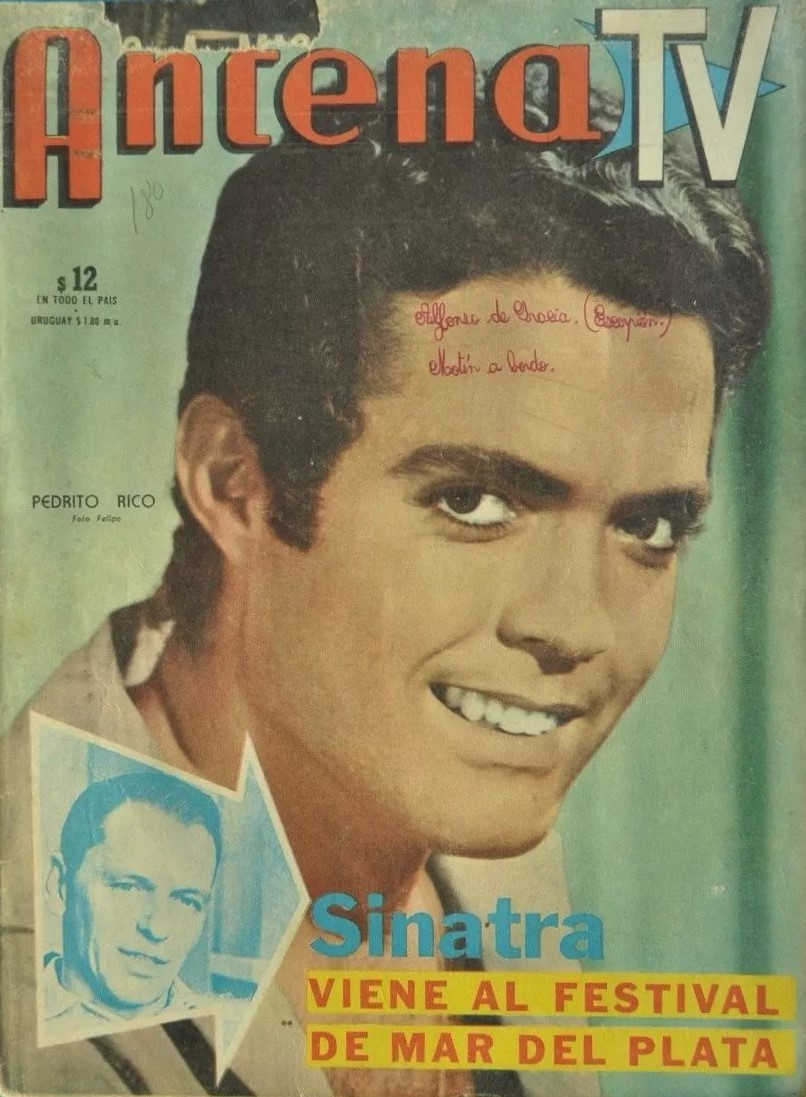
Pedrito Rico (1963)

Pedro Rico Cutillas, better known as Pedrito Rico (7 September 1932 – 21 June 1988) was a Spanish Gypsy singer, dancer and actor who spent most of his career in Argentina. He was born in Elda, Alicante and died in Barcelona.

== Biography ==
In 1955 he debuted at the Ruzafa Theater in Valencia, then moved to the Price Theater in Madrid. In 1956 he was hired by an Argentine theatrical entrepreneur to perform at the Avenida Theater, the theater of zarzuelas, located in a place where a large Spanish community is concentrated in the city of Buenos Aires. In 1958 he was awarded the Golden Record in Cuba and the Guaicaipuro in Venezuela as the best foreign interpreter.

It has been argued that Pedrito Rico was just one Argentinian more for his continuous and successful visits to that country. He sang Spanish songs, flamenco, melodic and sometimes also new bolero or tropical songs with Spanish-style arrangements and adapted to his particular way of singing. He had started very young and was consecrated in Argentina with the company "Romería", in Avenida Theater, in 1956. He immediately won the favor of the public, which gave him the alias of "El Ángel de España", which subsequently served as title to one of his films.

He had an excellent voice and was a good dancer, taking into account that he made big efforts to always present his performances in very good conditions, both physical in general and vocal in particular. His colorful performances and colorful shirts were famous, as well as his special make-up, which served to evoke perverse comments and bitter criticism from his detractors, from those who did not consider him a true Spaniard. However, none of this prevented him from filling the theaters where he appeared or that his performances and his songs were the object of great acclaim, as well as positive journalistic reviews of entertainment. Being a homosexual—at that time he maintained a relationship with Miguel de Mairena—he suffered serious problems during the dictatorship of Francisco Franco in Barcelona, where he was frequently harassed and detained, a situation that forced him to move to America, a continent in which he had an assured triumph. It was speculated that he imitated Antonio Amaya, who was known as "El Gitanillo de Bronce". When Antonio Amaya visited America, he was not liked because it was believed that he imitated Pedrito Rico.

He died in Barcelona. The singer was under medical treatment due to severe anemia that he had suffered for a year. A relapse in his state of health caused his death minutes before three in the morning of June 21, 1988. He had been greatly affected by the death of his mother, which occurred the previous year. It is said that he was one of the pioneers of the Spanish song, of which he recorded several dozen albums, with hits such as La Campanera, Dos Cruces and Mi Escapulario. Among his best-known songs are also The Ship of Oblivion, Black Dove, But Pray For Me, Paper Doll, Only Smile and Consuelo The Cantaora. The movie "The Angel of Spain" gave him great popularity throughout Latin America, where he was already known by this name.

Pedrito Rico was distinguished in 1980 with the Medal of Merit at Work for his dedication to Spanish folk music. The mortal remains of the singer were transferred to his hometown, where they were buried. In Elda, the loss of the singer caused a deep impression. The ardent chapel, after the arrival of his mortal remains, was installed in the headquarters of the local Assembly of The Red Cross, as his house was insufficient to receive the testimony of pain from his friends and admirers.

Pedrito Rico used to spend a summer season in his hometown, although his favorite place to spend the summer was the town of Benidorm, also in Alicante, where he had a house. He also owned another residence in Buenos Aires, where he spent most of the year and was his center of operations during his seasons of performances.

== Filmography ==
- Vestida de novia (1966)
- Buenas noches, Buenos Aires (1964)
- Feria en Sevilla (1962)
- Venga a bailar el rock (1957)
- El ángel de España (1957)
