= Gran Hermano (Spanish TV series) season 16 =

Gran Hermano
- Season 16
- Presented by: Mercedes Milá
- No. of days: 102
- No. of housemates: 17
- Winner: Sofía Suescun
- Runner-up: Aritz Castro
- No. of episodes: 17

Release
- Original network: Telecinco
- Original release: September 13 – December 23, 2015

Season chronology
- ← Previous; Season 15 Next → Season 17

Gran Hermano 16 is the sixteenth season of Gran Hermano, the Spanish version of the reality television series franchise Big Brother. The 16th season started airing on September 13, 2015, on Telecinco with Mercedes Milá hosting the main live shows or "Galas". The grand prize this season was €300,000. The main twist of the season was that every contestant had to keep a secret, a game mechanics from the Secret Story franchise. In case a competitor voluntarily revealed their secret, they will lose €100,000 of the final prize. The season was won by 19-year-old Sofía Suescun on Day 102.

Suso was a contestant on Supervivientes: Honduras 2016 where he was the 12th contestant to be voted out, finishing in 4th place.

Niedziela was a contestant on Got Talent España. She became finalist of the contest.

Sofía was a contestant on Supervivientes: Honduras 2018. She was the sole survivor, winning with the 53.8% of the votes. As a result of this, Sofía became the first person to win Gran Hermano and Supervivientes and the first Gran Hermano housemate to win Supervivientes.

Suso was a contestant on Gran Hermano VIP 6. After 99 days in the house, he became the runner-up of the season.

Raquel and Sofía were contestants on Gran Hermano Dúo. Raquel was the 7th evicted from the house after 51 days. Sofía was the 4th evicted after 31 days in the house but on Day 52 she won the repechage and became an official housemate. She was re-evicted and the 11th evicted on Day 80.

== Housemates ==
Housemates	Age	Residence	Occupation	Secret	Entered	Exited	Status
Sofía Suescun	19	Pamplona	Psychology student	Maite's daughter*	Day 1	Day 102	Winner
Aritz Castro	25	Santurtzi	Craftsman	He hasn't got any secret*	Day 1	Day 102	Runner-up
Niedziela Raluy	22	Tortosa	Circus performer	She shares a secret garden	Day 1	Day 101	16th Evicted
Han Wang	21	Armilla	Electrical Engineering student	He speaks Spanish*	Day 1	Day 96	15th Evicted
Marta Peñate	25	Las Palmas	Journalism student	She knows all secrets*	Day 1	Day 89	14th Evicted
Carlos Rengel	25	Barcelona	Bar owner	Ivy's husband*	Day 1	Day 89	13th Evicted
Daniel Vera	23	Sabadell	Kitchen helper	He shares a secret garden	Day 1	Day 82	12th Evicted
Ricky Natalicchio	26	Las Palmas	Paddel teacher and student	He knows the repechage house	Day 40	Day 82	11th Evicted
Marina Landaluce	29	Motilla del Palancar	Administrative assistant	Mother of a reborn baby*	Day 1	Day 75	10th Evicted
Jesús "Suso" Álvarez	22	Barcelona	Shop manager	Maite's false son*	Day 1	Day 68	9th Evicted
Raquel Martín	29	Moraleja	Sports physiotherapist	She shares a secret garden	Day 1 Day 40	Day 26; Day 61	3rd Evicted
Raquel Martín	29	Moraleja	Sports physiotherapist	She shares a secret garden	Day 1 Day 40	Day 26; Day 61	8th Evicted
Amanda Rodríguez	25	Málaga	Marketing student	She was a professional athlete*	Day 1	Day 54	7th Evicted
Carolina Vico	21	Vidreres	Model and horse riding teacher	She can see ghosts in the dark	Day 1	Day 47	6th Evicted
Ivy Mauleón	23	Barcelona	Business Management student	Carlos' wife*	Day 1	Day 40	5th Evicted
Enrique Ramos	30	Huelva	Doctor and oncologist	He knows everything about Gran Hermano*	Day 1 Day 40	Day 33; Day 45	4th Evicted
Muti Orellana	22	Seville	Baker	He has access to spy room	Day 1 Day 40	Day 19; Day 43	2nd Evicted
Maite Galdeano	46	Pamplona	Bus driver	Sofia's mother and Suso's false mother*	Day 1 Day 40	Day 12; Day 47	1st Evicted
Guests
Contestant	Age	Residence	Occupation	Reality Show	Entered	Exited	Exchanged with...
Daniela Clyde "Danielle"	25	Mexico City, Mexico	Student	Big Brother 4 Mexico	Day 61	Day 66	Daniel Vera

- (*) Secret exposed by a rival contestant.
- (Italics) Secret exposed by him / herself. (They would have lost €100,000 of the final prize if they had won)

=== Amanda ===
Amanda Rodríguez Morales is a 25-year-old student from Málaga. She describes herself as artificial-looking but natural in spirit. When she entered the house on Day One, her secret remained undisclosed to the audience. In the second week, Sabrina Salerno introduced a medal at the house to play the game of immunity. The following week, several Gym Tony actors introduced another medal for the same game. The organization of Gran Hermano revealed that these medals were a clue to discover another secret. On the Internet photos of Amanda as triple jump champion began to appear. She guessed that Mayte and Sofia were mother and daughter in week 2. Her secret was discovered on the third assembly of secrets. She was the seventh evicted on Day 54 in her third nomination. Her eviction was surprisingly for her: the program made Marina and Amanda believe that they were saved from elimination, then the host connected with them during the ceremony and communicated that Amanda was evicted.

=== Aritz ===
Aritz Castro De las Heras is a 24-year-old from Santurtzi, Biscay. He claims that he does not own a television, he nevers surfs the internet and he has never watched the show before entering the house. His secret is that he is the only contestant without a secret to keep. During the first week, appeared on the Internet several Aritz social networks, as well as his personal blog. He guessed that Marina wasn't mother in week 2. He finished as the runner up on Day 102.

=== Carlos ===
Carlos Rengel Sobreviela is a 25-year-old bar owner from Barcelona. He entered the house on Day One right after his girlfriend Ivy, who was unaware she would also join the competition, along with their dog Hito. Just upon entering the house, he proposed marriage to Ivy, she accepted, and a marriage promise ceremony was conducted immediately. For the rest of the housemates, he had to pretend he did not know Ivy from before. She guessed that Mayte and Sofia were mother and daughter in week 2. Carlos and Ivy's secret was discovered on the third assembly of secrets. Carlos' prize will be reduced in €100,000 in case he wins as a punishment for hinting his secret. He was the thirteenth housemate to be evicted on Day 89.

=== Carolina ===
Carolina Vico Bustamante is a 21-year-old girl from Vidreres, Girona. While she aspires to become a professional model, she takes hairdressing and make up courses and she is also a horsewoman. She affirms she has an extrovert personality but she does not forgive easily if she is hurt. When she entered the house on Day One, her secret remained undisclosed to the audience. During the second gala, Mercedes Milà revealed to the contestants that someone inside the House was able to see ghosts. The following week the program revealed that that person was Carolina. On many nights she woke up frightened and ran to sleep with Marta. Ironically, she was the sixth evicted on Day 47 during a Halloween show.

=== Enrique ===
Enrique Ramos Villarán is a 30-year-old doctor and oncologist from Huelva. A single man, he considers himself romantic, home-loving, honest, distrustful and stubborn. When he entered the house on Day One, his secret remained undisclosed to the audience. In the following weeks, the program revealed that there was a competitor who was considered to be expert in Big Brother. In the last assembly of the secrets, Enrique confessed that he was the expert and that he had watched Big Brother of Spain and of other countries. Many spectators and also many contestants were thinking that he had some type of kinship with Carolina. In the week three, he gained the immunity and he wanted to liberate Han of the nomination instead of to herself, invoking that he wanted to face Suso in nomination. He was the fourth evicted on Day 33. He tried to return to the contest and he lived in the apartment with Mayte, Raquel and Muti until he was eliminated as a third option chosen by the audience.

=== Han ===
Han Wang is a Chinese-born 21-year-old student living in Armilla, Granada with his family, who runs a bazaar store. He describes himself as sociable, very smiling, fun, passionate and unique. He had to pretend he does not speak any Spanish. His secret was revealed on the first "assembly of secrets". He was the fifteenth housemate to be evicted on Day 96.

=== Ivy ===
Tania Mauleón Espinosa is a Mexican-born 22-year-old student residing in Barcelona. After the competition, she wants to move to Australia, where her mother lives, together with her boyfriend Carlos and their dog Ito. She was surprised to see Carlos and Hito enter the house right after her on Day One; Carlos proposed marriage to her right then, she accepted, and a marriage promise ceremony was conducted immediately. For the rest of the housemates, she had to pretend he did not know Carlos from before while she had an affair with Vera. Carlos and Ivy's secret was discovered on the third assembly of secrets and Ito had to moved out of the house. She was the fifth evicted on Day 40. She didn't take part on the repesca.

=== Maite ===
María Teresa (Maite) Galdeano Marañón is a 46-year-old bus driver from Pamplona. She considers herself determined and feisty. Divorced for the last 12 years and a mother of three, she entered the house on Day One along with her daughter Sofía. She had to pretend she did not know Sofía from before. At the same time, she had to pretend Suso is her son; Maite and Suso's secret was revealed on the first "assembly of secrets". Maite and Sofía's secret was revealed on the second assembly of secrets. She was the first evicted on Day 12. She tried to return to the contest and she lived in the apartment with Enrique, Raquel and Muti until she was eliminated as a second option chosen by the audience.

=== Marina ===
Marina Landaluce Rodríguez is a 28-year-old administrative assistant from Motilla del Palancar, Cuenca. She loves cooking. She apparently entered the house with her 1 month old baby Juan, who would stay in an adjacent camera-less room with a babysitter so that she could visit him when needed. It remained unclear to the audience whether her secret was that the baby is unreal. Marina's secret was revealed on the second "assembly of secrets": Juan is one of the three reborn dolls Marina owns. She was the tenth evicted on Day 75.

=== Marta ===
Marta Peñate Amador is a 24-year-old journalism student from Las Palmas. She was surprised to learn she would become a housemate while she was covering the press conference to present the season just days before the competition began. Her secret is that she is the only housemate that knows all the secrets beforehand. Marta' prize will be reduced in €100,000 in case she wins as a punishment for hinting her secret. She was the fourteenth housemate to be evicted on Day 89.

=== Muti ===
Muti Orellana Felipe is a Senegalese origin 22-year-old baker from Seville who works in the family business. His family describes him as a good guy but somehow a bit lazy. He entered the house on Day One as an "invisible" housemate; neither the fellow housemates nor the audience saw his image and did not know where he really was physically. There was a point in the house where he could talk to the rest of the housemates and listen to their conversations. It was later revealed he spent the first days in an adjacent room. On Day 4 he joined the main house physically and was assigned a new secret: he was shown a secret entrance to a place where he can observe his housemates without being seen. He guessed that Mayte and Sofia were mother and daughter in week 2. He was the second evicted on Day 19. He tried to return to the contest and he lived in the apartment with Mayte, Raquel and Enrique until he was eliminated as a fifth option chosen by the audience behind the option that gave the possibility that no one was returning to the contest.

=== Niedziela ===
Niedziela Raluy Swider is a 22-year-old circus performer of Polish descent. Born in Tortosa, Tarragona, she travels around the world with her family's circus. She considers the Gran Hermano house to be her first stable home address. When she entered the house on Day One, she was told one of the two ways to get into the "secret garden", a room that must remain unknown to most of the housemates. She was made believe only Vera and herself know about the secret garden. She guessed that Mayte and Suso weren't mother and son in week 1. In week 3 she was assigned a new secret mission: together with Raquel, she has to make sure everybody in the house gets into the secret garden while Vera remains unaware of the new development. She was the sixteenth housemate to be evicted on Day 101.

=== Raquel ===
Raquel Martín Lozano is a 29-year-old physiotherapist from Moraleja, Cáceres. She considers she is a person that enjoys every minute in her life. When she entered the house on Day One, she was told one of the two ways to get into the "secret garden", a room that must remain unknown to most of the housemates. She was made believe only Vera and herself know about the secret garden. In week 3 she was assigned a new secret mission: together with Nidziela, she has to make sure everybody in the house gets into the secret garden while Vera remains unaware of the new development. She was the third evicted on Day 26. In the repechage, she was the most voted to re-enter the House, with 61.1% of public vote. She won a place in the House as an official housemate again on Day 47. She was reevicted and the eighth evicted on Day 61.

=== Ricky ===
Ricky Natalicchio is a 26-year-old paddle teacher and student from Las Palmas. He was born on Argentina. He entered the house on Day 40, and his secret was that he knows the existence of the apartment, where Raquel, Enrique, Mayte and Muti were living. He was the eleventh evicted on Day 82.

=== Sofía Suescun ===
Sofía Anna Suescun Galdeano is a 19-year-old student from Pamplona. She describes herself as wild, fun and with a sense of humour. She entered the house on Day One along with her mother Maite, with whom she has always been. She had to pretend she did not know Maite, her mother, from outside the reality show. Maite and Sofía's secret was revealed on the second "assembly of secrets". She became the winner on Day 102 with 60.7% of the vote.

=== Suso ===
Jesús (Suso) Álvarez Perera is a 22-year-old shop manager from Barcelona. He affirms he is seducer of women and wants to win the prize to start Penitentiary Social Assistance studies. He had to pretend he is Maite's son, unknowing Sofía is Maite's true daughter. Maite and Suso's secret was revealed on the first "assembly of secrets". She guessed that Mayte and Sofia were mother and daughter in week 2. He was the ninth housemate to be evicted on Day 68.

=== Vera ===
Daniel Vera Bueno (Vera) is a 23-year-old kitchen helper from Sabadell, Barcelona. He loves breakdancing. He wants to win the prize to aid his family economically and start Social Integration studies. He is the only housemate, along with Nidziela and Raquel, to know of the existence of the "secret garden" and how to get into there. He has to make sure Nidziela and Raquel do not know respectively that there is a second woman in the house who knows about the secret garden. He guessed that Han can speak Spanish in week 1. He was the twelfth evicted on Day 82.

== Secrets ==
In this season, each contestant has to keep a secret while trying to discover the other contestants' one. If someone's reveals his secret, the main prize will be reduced in €100,000, in case of victory. The one who discovers a secret wins a reward, the one who gets his secret revealed gets punished in nominations. Each week, during the main "gala" show, there is an "assembly of secrets".

== Nomination table ==
This season, all Housemates were able to nominate 3 other Housemates each week. The first Housemate listed is nominated for three points, the next Housemate is nominated for two points, while the last Housemate listed is nominated for one point. If a Housemate's secret is discovered, they will lose their right to nominate for three points.

	Week 1	Week 2	Week 3	Week 4	Week 5	Week 6	Week 7	Week 8	Week 9	Week 10	Week 11		Week 12	Week 13	Week 14	Week 15 Final
	Week 1	Week 2	Week 3	Week 4	Week 5	Week 6	Week 7	Week 8	Week 9	Week 10	Day 75	Day 82	Week 12	Week 13	Week 14	Week 15 Final
Sofía	Marina; Enrique; Carolina	Ivy; Raquel	Raquel; Marina (1) Vera	Suso; Amanda	Ivy; Vera; Marina	Vera; Carolina; Carlos	Marina; Carlos; Vera	Raquel; Suso; Marina	Aritz; Carlos; Marina	Marina; Aritz; Carlos	Aritz; Ricky; Carlos	No; Nominations	No; Nominations	No; Nominations	No; Nominations	Winner (Day 102)
Aritz	Maite; Raquel; Sofía	Raquel; Muti; Carlos	Sofía; Suso; Carlos (2) Raquel	Suso; Marta	Vera; Ivy; Suso	Vera; Carolina; Sofía	Ricky; Vera; Sofía	Sofía; Ricky; Marta	Sofía; Vera; Ricky	Han; Marta; Niedziela	Ricky; Marta; Sofía	No; Nominations	No; Nominations	No; Nominations	No; Nominations	Runner-up (Day 102)
Niedziela	Maite; Sofía; Raquel	Muti; Raquel; Carlos	Amanda; Raquel; Sofía (1) Suso	Suso; Amanda; Han	Suso; Amanda; Ivy	Carolina; Suso; Amanda	Suso; Amanda; Ricky	Suso; Raquel; Han	Suso; Han; Aritz	Carlos; Aritz; Han	Ricky; Carlos; Aritz	No; Nominations	No; Nominations	No; Nominations	No; Nominations	Evicted (Day 101)
Han	Maite; Sofía	Muti; Suso	Suso; Carolina (2) Carlos	Suso; Carolina	Vera; Ivy; Carlos	Carolina; Carlos; Vera	Ricky; Carlos; Suso	Ricky; Niedziela; Carlos	Ricky; Vera; Niedziela	Carlos; Marina; Ricky	Ricky; Carlos; Vera	No; Nominations	No; Nominations	No; Nominations	Evicted (Day 96)	
Marta	Maite; Raquel; Enrique	Raquel; Muti; Carlos	Raquel; Amanda; Vera (2) Marina	Suso; Aritz	Suso; Ivy; Amanda	Carolina; Amanda; Aritz	Amanda; Carlos; Aritz	Raquel; Suso; Marina	Suso; Marina; Aritz	Carlos; Aritz; Marina	Aritz; Ricky; Carlos	No; Nominations	No; Nominations	Evicted (Day 89)		
Carlos	Maite; Sofía; Raquel	Raquel; Enrique; Marina	Raquel; Marina (1) Amanda	Amanda; Han	Han; Amanda; Marina	Niedziela; Marta; Sofía	Marina; Marta; Niedziela	Raquel; Marta; Han	Han; Sofía; Marina	Marta; Han; Niedziela	Han; Marta; Niedziela	No; Nominations	No; Nominations	Evicted (Day 89)		
Vera	Maite; Sofía; Raquel	Muti; Raquel; Marina	Raquel; Sofía; Amanda (2) Marina	Sofía; Amanda; Han	Suso; Amanda; Han	Suso; Amanda; Carolina	Amanda; Suso; Ricky	Suso; Ricky; Aritz	Suso; Han; Sofía	Ricky; Han; Sofía	Aritz; Ricky; Carlos	No; Nominations	Evicted (Day 82)			
Ricky	Not in House					Exempt	Vera; Niedziela; Aritz	Han; Aritz; Marina	Han; Marina; Aritz	Han; Marina; Marta	Marta; Aritz; Han	Evicted (Day 82)				
Marina	Sofía; Marta; Maite	Muti; Suso	Suso; Raquel (2) Sofía	Suso; Marta	Suso; Ivy; Sofía	Sofía; Suso; Carlos	Suso; Sofía; Carlos	Raquel; Sofía; Marta	Suso; Ricky; Sofía	Han; Marta; Sofía	Evicted (Day 75)					
Suso	Raquel; Marina	Enrique; Ivy	Marina; Ivy (2) Niedziela	Enrique; Ivy	Vera; Ivy; Marina	Niedziela; Vera; Carolina	Marina; Niedziela; Vera	Sofía; Marina; Marta	Niedziela; Marina; Han	Evicted (Day 68)						
Raquel	Maite; Sofía; Marta	Marta; Aritz; Suso	Sofía; Marta; Carlos (1) Vera	Evicted (Day 26)		Secret; Room	Exempt	Marta; Sofía; Marina	Re-Evicted (Day 61)							
Amanda	Sofía; Maite; Marta	Sofía	Sofía; Marta (1) Carlos	Enrique; Ivy	Vera; Ivy; Carlos	Vera; Niedziela; Marta	Marta; Niedziela; Vera	Evicted (Day 54)								
Carolina	Maite; Raquel; Sofía	Raquel; Muti; Han	Raquel; Amanda; Han	Suso; Amanda; Han	Han; Sofía; Suso	Niedziela; Marta; Vera	Evicted (Day 47)									
Ivy	Maite; Raquel; Sofía	Raquel; Muti; Marina	Raquel; Amanda (1) Suso	Suso; Amanda	Suso; Han; Marina	Evicted (Day 40)										
Enrique	Maite; Sofía; Marta	Suso; Muti; Niedziela	Suso; Amanda; Raquel (2) Sofía	Amanda; Suso	Evicted (Day 33)	Secret; Room	Re-Evicted (Day 45)									
Muti	Exempt	Ivy; Niedziela; Enrique	Evicted (Day 19)			Secret; Room	Re-Evicted (Day 43)									
Maite	Marina; Amanda	Evicted (Day 12)				Secret; Room	Re-Evicted (Day 47)									
Nomination notes	1, 2	3, 4, 5	6, 7, 8	9, 10	11, 12	13, 14	15	16	17	18	19, 20	21				None
Against public vote	Maite; Raquel; Sofía	Ivy; Muti; Raquel; Sofía	Amanda; Raquel; Sofía	Amanda; Enrique; Suso	Han; Ivy; Vera	Carolina; Niedziela; Vera	Amanda; Marina; Ricky; Suso; Vera	Marta; Raquel; Sofía	Marina; Sofía; Suso	Han; Marina; Marta	Aritz; Marta; Ricky	All housemates				Aritz; Sofía
Evicted	Maite; 51% to evict (out of 2)	Muti; 65.2% to evict (out of 2)	Raquel; 51% to evict (out of 2)	Enrique; 50.2% to evict (out of 2)	Ivy; 60.6% to evict	Carolina; 70.5% to evict	Amanda; 57.5% to evict (out of 2)	Raquel; 50.4% to evict (out of 2)	Suso; 61.8% to evict (out of 2)	Marina; Most votes to evict (out of 2)	Ricky; 59% to evict (out of 2)	Vera; Fewest votes to save (out of 7)	Carlos; 9.7% to save (out of 6)	Han; Fewest votes to save (out of 4)	Niedziela; Fewest votes to save (out of 3)	Aritz; 39.3% to win
Evicted	Maite; 51% to evict (out of 2)	Muti; 65.2% to evict (out of 2)	Raquel; 51% to evict (out of 2)	Enrique; 50.2% to evict (out of 2)	Ivy; 60.6% to evict	Carolina; 70.5% to evict	Amanda; 57.5% to evict (out of 2)	Raquel; 50.4% to evict (out of 2)	Suso; 61.8% to evict (out of 2)	Marina; Most votes to evict (out of 2)	Ricky; 59% to evict (out of 2)	Vera; Fewest votes to save (out of 7)	Marta; 12.2% to save (out of 5)	Han; Fewest votes to save (out of 4)	Niedziela; Fewest votes to save (out of 3)	Sofía; 60.7% to win

=== Notes ===
This housemate was directly nominated for eviction prior to the regular nominations process.
This housemate was granted immunity from nominations.
This housemate won the right to nominate automatically a housemate.
- ^Note 1: On Day 4, Muti left the adjacent room and joined the main House. The public decided with 65% of the public votes that Muti would be exempt from the nominations process this week.
- ^Note 2: Due to the secrets of Han, Maite and Suso being discovered, they are no longer able to nominate with three points.
- ^Note 3: Amanda won the right to automatically nominate a Housemate prior to nominations. She nominated Sofía.
- ^Note 4: Due to the secrets of Marina and Sofía being discovered, they are no longer able to nominate with three points.
- ^Note 5: The Housemates who discovered some secrets this week could save a nominated Housemate, they decided to save Suso.
- ^Note 6: Enrique won immunity in a challenge.
- ^Note 7: Due to the secrets of Amanda, Carlos and Ivy being discovered, they are no longer able to nominate with three points.
- ^Note 8: This week, Housemates had the opportunity to earn an extra 1 or 2 points to nominate an extra Housemate with. Housemates that won extra points have a 1 or 2 listed next to the person they nominated with said points.
- ^Note 9: Enrique won the right to save a nominated housemate in the immunity challenge. He saved Han.
- ^Note 10: Due to the secrets of Aritz, Enrique and Marta being discovered, they are no longer able to nominate with three points.
- ^Note 11: Suso won the right to save a nominated housemate in the immunity challenge. He saved himself.
- ^Note 12: From this round, all the housemates are eligible to nominate with 3, 2 and 1 point.
- ^Note 13: Marina won immunity in the immunity challenge.
- ^Note 14: Ricky entered as a new housemate and for this reason he was exempt from nominations.
- ^Note 15: Raquel won the repechage with 61.1% and returned to the house because of this, she was exempt from nominations.
- ^Note 16: Suso won the right to save a nominated housemate in the immunity challenge. He saved himself.
- ^Note 17: Han won the right to save a nominated housemate in the immunity challenge. He saved himself.
- ^Note 18: Carlos won the right to save a nominated housemate in the immunity challenge. He saved himself.
- ^Note 19: The relatives' housemates made the nominations instead themselves.
- ^Note 20: Carlos' parents won the right to save a nominated housemate in the immunity challenge. They saved their son Carlos.
- ^Note 21: Lines were opened to vote for the winner. The housemate with fewest votes would be evicted.

== Nominations total received ==
	Week 1	Week 2	Week 3	Week 4	Week 5	Week 6	Week 7	Week 8	Week 9	Week 10	Week 11	Week 12	Week 13	Week 14	Week 15	Total
Sofía	20	–	15	3	3	5	3	10	7	2	1	–	–	–	Winner	69
Aritz	0	2	0	1	0	1	2	3	6	6	12	–	–	–	Runner-up	33
Niedziela	0	3	2	0	0	11	7	2	4	2	1	–	–	–	Evicted	32
Han	0	1	1	4	9	0	0	5	11	14	4	–	–	–	Evicted	49
Marta	5	3	3	2	0	5	5	8	0	8	7	–	–	Evicted		46
Carlos	0	3	5	0	2	4	7	1	2	10	7	–	–	Evicted		41
Vera	0	0	3	0	14	13	8	0	4	0	1	–	Evicted			43
Ricky	Not in House					-	8	7	6	4	15	Evicted				40
Marina	6	3	8	0	4	–	9	6	8	8	Evicted					52
Suso	0	6	11	19	17	7	9	10	12	Evicted						91
Raquel	13	20	21	Evicted			-	14	Evicted							68
Amanda	1	0	12	12	7	5	8	Evicted								45
Carolina	1	0	1	1	0	15	Evicted									18
Ivy	0	6	1	2	16	Evicted										25
Enrique	3	5	-	4	Evicted											12
Muti	–	20	Evicted													20
Maite	32	Evicted														32

== Debate: Blind results ==
Week	1stPlace to Evict	2ndPlace to Evict	3rdPlace to Evict	4thPlace to Evict	5thPlace to Evict	6thPlace to Evict
1	61%	30%	9%			
1	45%	45%	10%			
1	47%	43%	10%			
1	46.1%	44.7%	9.2%			
1	51%	49%				
2	40%	25%	18%	17%		
2	41.1%	26.7%	19.2%	13%		
2	40.4%	27.1%	19.4%	13.1%		
3	52.2%	44.7%	3.1%			
3	49.6%	48.4%	2%			
3	49.1%	49.1%	1.8%			
4	54.4%	42.4%	3.2%			
4	51.5%	45.5%	3%			
5	64.7%	25%	10.3%			
5	64%	24.5%	11.5%			
6	53%	33%	8%	3%	1%	
6	50.6%	49.4%				
6	73.5%	19.2%	7.3%			
7	54.5%	38.3%	3.6%	3.1%	0.5%	
7	53.3%	38.4%	4.7%	2.8%	0.8%	
7	53.5%	38.6%	5%	2.9%		
7	51.5%	38.5%	7.2%	2.8%		
8	51.5%	46.1%	2.4%			
8	50.9%	45.5%	3.6%			
8	51.1%	45.1%	3.8%			
8	50.8%	45.3%	3.9%			
8	49.9%	46.5%	3.6%			
8	51.4%	48.6%				
8	50.1%	49.9%				
8	50.3%	49.7%				
8	50.4%	49.6%				
9	55.1%	29.4%	15.5%			
9	55%	28.1%	16.9%			
9	53.5%	27.3%	19.2%			
9	50.1%	30.2%	19.7%			
10	59.3%	28.2%	12.5%			
10	59%	28.1%	12.9%			
11	55.3%	39.5%	5.2%			
11	55.7%	38.4%	5.9%			
11	55.7%	38.2%	6.1%			
12	36.3%	22.3%	11.4%	10.5%	10.2%	9.3%
12	36.8%	22.9%	10.9%	9.9%	9.9%	9.6%
12	36.9%	22.8%	10.9%	9.9%	9.8%	9.7%
13	43.5%	27.1%	15.1%	14.3%		
13	44.6%	26.8%	15.1%	13.5%		
13	44.5%	26.8%	15.5%	13.2%		
14	50.5%	30%	19.5%			

== Repechage ==
The public voting will decide the top ex-housemates to officially return to the Gran Hermano house as official housemates.

The repechage was officially announced on Day 40 (October 22, 2015). All the evicted housemates (Maite, Muti, Raquel and Enrique) are there. They are currently living in the Apartment (Secret Room or House 2). All of them are up for returning to the house with a fifth option of none of them coming back.

Ex-housemate	%	Elimination's Day
Raquel	61.1%	Gala October 29, 2015
Maite	38.9%	Gala October 29, 2015
Enrique	9.2%	Última Hora October 27, 2015
None	2.9%	Última Hora October 27, 2015
Muti	2%	Debate October 25, 2015

== Ratings ==
=== "Galas" ===
- On Thursdays and on Sundays (September 13).

Show N°	Day	Viewers	Ratings share
1 – Launch	Sunday, September 13	3,407,000	24.8%
2	Thursday, September 17	2,762,000	24.1%
3	Thursday, September 24	2,910,000	24.1%
4	Thursday, October 1	2,642,000	22.2%
5	Thursday, October 8	2,943,000	24.6%
6	Thursday, October 15	2,739,000	22.7%
7	Thursday, October 22	2,541,000	20.8%
8	Thursday, October 29	2,796,000	22.7%
9	Thursday, November 5	2,877,000	23.8%
10	Thursday, November 12	2,683,000	22%
11	Thursday, November 19	2,904,000	23.6%
12	Thursday, November 26	2.782.000	22.7%
13	Thursday, December 3	2,739,000	22.4%
14	Thursday, December 10	2,877,000	23.0%
15	Thursday, December 17	3,002,000	24.4%
16	Tuesday, December 22	2,535,000	19.7%
17 – Final	Wednesday, December 23	3,214,000	24.6%

=== "Debates" ===
Show N°	Day	Viewers	Ratings share
1	Sunday, September 20	2,602,000	20.2%
2	Sunday, September 27	2,327,000	16.8%
3	Sunday, October 4	2,138,000	16.7%
4	Sunday, October 11	2,083,000	16.2%
5	Sunday, October 18	2,127,000	16.2%
6	Sunday, October 25	2,208,000	17%
7	Sunday, November 1	2,201,000	16.8%
8	Sunday, November 8	2,311,000	17.7%
9	Sunday, November 15	2,267,000	16.9%
10	Sunday, November 22	2,386,000	17.7%
11	Sunday, November 29	2,170,000	15.9%
12	Sunday, December 6	2,129,000	16.2%
13	Sunday, December 13	2,444,000	18.2%
14	Sunday, December 20	1,125,000	15%
15 – Final	Sunday, December 27	2,186,000	15.8%

=== "Última Hora" ===
Show N°	Day	Viewers	Ratings share
1 – Launch	Tuesday, September 22	2,349,000	15.9%
2	Tuesday, September 29	1,844,000	14.3%
3	Tuesday, October 6	1,904,000	15.3%
4	Tuesday, October 13	2,021,000	16.4%
5	Tuesday, October 20	1,885,000	16%
6	Tuesday, October 27	1,990,000	17.1%
7	Tuesday, November 3	2,009,000	16.8%
8	Tuesday, November 10	2,181,000	18.1%
9	Tuesday, November 17	2,096,000	17.7%
10	Tuesday, November 24	1,903,000	15.8%
11	Tuesday, December 1	2,011,000	17.0%
12	Tuesday, December 8	2,082,000	16.2%
13	Tuesday, December 15	2,090,000	16.3%
