= Supervivientes: Perdidos en Honduras (2016) =

- Presented by: Jorge Javier Vázquez
- No. of days: 83
- No. of castaways: 16
- Winner: Jorge Díaz
- Runner-up: Yola Berrocal
- Location: Cayos Cochinos, Honduras
- No. of episodes: 13

Release
- Original network: Telecinco
- Original release: April 21 – July 12, 2016

Season chronology
- ← Previous; 2015 Next → 2017

Supervivientes 2016: Perdidos en Honduras is the eleventh season of the show Supervivientes and the fifteenth season of Survivor to air in Spain. It was broadcast on Telecinco from 21 April 2016 to 12 July 2016.

Jorge Javier Vázquez was the main host at the central studio in Madrid, with Lara Álvarez co-hosting from the island, and Sandra Barneda hosting a side debate of the program. For this year, the first two contestants, Cristian Nieto and Mª Carmen Torrecillas, were selected in Pasaporte a la isla.

== Finishing order ==
Contestant	Occupation/Famous For	Original tribe	Merged tribe	Finish
Antonio Tejado; 29, Sevilla	Television personality Supervivientes 2014 contestant	Water		Evacuated; Day 15
El Dioni; 66, Madrid	Robbed a security van	Water		1st voted out Day 22
M.ª Carmen Torrecillas; 55, Jaén	QQCCMH? star Pasaporte a la isla winner	Fire		2nd voted out Day 29
Cristian Nieto; 25, Madrid	MyHyV star Pasaporte a la isla winner	Water		3rd voted out Day 29
Mario D'Amico; 32, Milan	Model & snowboarder	Water		4th voted out Day 36
Miriam Saavedra; 22, Lima	Model	Water	Exile	5th voted out Day 43
Víctor Sandoval; 49, Sitges	Television host	Fire	Merged	6th voted out Day 50
Dulce Delapiedra; 48, Sevilla	Isabel Pantoja's child's nanny	Fire	Merged	7th voted out Day 57
Yurena; 46, Barakaldo	Singer	Water	Exile	8th voted out Day 64
Carla Barber; 26, Las Palmas	Miss Universe Spain 2015	Fire	Merged	9th voted out Day 69
Paco de Benito; 45, Pozuelo de Alarcón	Pasapalabra winner	Fire	Merged	10th voted out Day 69
Patricia Pérez, Steisy; 24, Granada	MyHyV star	Water	Merged	11th voted out Day 76
Suso Álvarez; 23, Barcelona	Gran Hermano 16 housemate	Fire	Merged	12th voted out Day 83
Mila Ximénez; 63, Madrid	Television panelist	Fire	Merged	Third Place; Day 83
Yola Berrocal; 45, Madrid	Media personality	Water	Merged	Runner-Up; Day 83
Jorge Díaz; 25, Madrid	Model	Fire	Merged	Sole Survivor; Day 83

== Nominations ==
	Week 1	Week 2	Week 3	Week 4	Week 5	Week 6	Week 7	Week 8	Week 9	Week 10	Week 11	Week 12	Final		Total votes
Jorge	Dulce	Víctor	Dulce	Víctor	Mila	Víctor	Steisy	Yola	Mila	Yola	Mila	Yola	Finalist	Sole Survivor (Day 83)	0
Yola	Yurena	Antonio	Cristian	Cristian	Suso	Steisy	Steisy	Suso	Steisy	Carla	Suso	Suso	Nominated	Runner-Up (Day 83)	10
Mila	Dulce	M.ª Carmen	Dulce	Víctor	Víctor	Víctor	Dulce	Suso	Steisy	Suso	Yola	Suso	Nominated	Third Place (Day 83)	4
Suso	Dulce	Víctor	Dioni	Mario	Mario	Dulce	Yola	Yola	Yola	Carla	Yola	Yola	Eliminated (Day 83)		12
Steisy	Yurena	Miriam	Mario	Mario	Yola	Dulce	Yola	Mila	Carla	Exile; Island	Nominated	Eliminated (Day 76)			5
Paco	Dulce	Dulce	Dulce	Víctor	Víctor	Víctor	Dulce	Mila	Exile; Island		Eliminated (Day 69)				3
Carla	Dulce	Dulce	Víctor	M.ª Carmen	Víctor	Paco	Dulce	Paco	Steisy	Suso	Eliminated (Day 69)				5
Yurena	Antonio	Exile; Island								Eliminated (Day 64)					7
Dulce	Víctor	Carla	Víctor	Cristian	Mario	Suso	Paco	Exile; Island	Eliminated (Day 57)						18
Víctor	Dulce	M.ª Carmen	Dulce	M.ª Carmen	Paco	Paco	Exile; Island	Eliminated (Day 50)							15
Miriam	Yurena	Antonio	Exile; Island				Eliminated (Day 43)								4
Mario	Yurena	Miriam	Steisy	Cristian	Suso	Eliminated (Day 36)									7
Cristian	Yurena	Yola	Mario	Mario	Eliminated (Day 29)										4
M.ª Carmen	Mila	Mila	Víctor	Víctor	Eliminated (Day 29)										3
Dioni	Yurena	Miriam	Cristian	Eliminated (Day 22)											0
Antonio	Yurena	Miriam	Evacuated (Day 15)												3
Notes	See note 1, 2, 3	See note 1, 4, 5	See note 1, 6, 7, 8, 9	See note 1, 10, 11, 12, 13	See note 1, 14, 15, 16	See note 1, 17, 18, 19, 20	See note 21, 22, 23, 24	See note 25, 26, 27	See note 28, 29, 30, 31	See note 32, 33, 34	See note 35, 36	See note 37	None		
Nominated by Tribe		Dulce; Miriam	Mario; Víctor	Víctor	Mario; Víctor	Dulce; Víctor	Dulce; Yola	Suso; Yola	Steisy; Yola	Carla	Yola	Suso			
Nominated by Tribe		Dulce; Miriam	Mario; Víctor	Mario	Mario; Víctor	Dulce; Víctor	Dulce; Yola	Suso; Yola	Steisy; Yola	Carla	Yola	Suso			
Nominated by Leader		Víctor; Yola	Dioni; Dulce	M.ª Carmen	Mila; Yola	Paco; Steisy	Steisy	Paco	Mila	Yola	Mila	Yola			
Nominated by Leader		Víctor; Yola	Dioni; Dulce	Cristian	Mila; Yola	Paco; Steisy	Steisy	Paco	Mila	Yola	Mila	Yola			
Nominated	Antonio; Dulce; Víctor; Yurena	Dulce; Miriam; Víctor; Yola	Dioni; Dulce; Mario; Víctor	M.ª Carmen; Víctor	Mario; Mila; Víctor; Yola	Dulce; Paco; Steisy; Víctor	Dulce; Steisy; Yola	Paco; Suso; Yola	Mila; Steisy; Yola	Carla; Yola	Mila; Steisy; Yola	Suso; Yola	Mila; Yola	Jorge; Yola	
Nominated	Antonio; Dulce; Víctor; Yurena	Dulce; Miriam; Víctor; Yola	Dioni; Dulce; Mario; Víctor	Cristian; Mario	Mario; Mila; Víctor; Yola	Dulce; Paco; Steisy; Víctor	Dulce; Steisy; Yola	Paco; Suso; Yola	Mila; Steisy; Yola	Carla; Yola	Mila; Steisy; Yola	Suso; Yola	Mila; Yola	Jorge; Yola	
Eliminated	Yurena; Fewest votes to save	Miriam; Fewest votes to save	Dioni; Fewest votes to save	M.ª Carmen; Fewest votes to save	Mario; Fewest votes to save	Víctor; Fewest votes to save	Dulce; Fewest votes to save	Paco; Fewest votes to save	Steisy; Fewest votes to save	Carla; Fewest votes to save	Steisy; Fewest votes to save	Suso; Fewest votes to save	Mila; Fewest votes to save	Yola; 46% to win	
Eliminated	Yurena; Fewest votes to save	Miriam; Fewest votes to save	Dioni; Fewest votes to save	Cristian; Fewest votes to save	Mario; Fewest votes to save	Víctor; Fewest votes to save	Dulce; Fewest votes to save	Paco; Fewest votes to save	Steisy; Fewest votes to save	Carla; Fewest votes to save	Steisy; Fewest votes to save	Suso; Fewest votes to save	Mila; Fewest votes to save	Jorge; 54% to win	
Exile Island Nominated			Dioni; Miriam; Yurena	Cristian; M.ª Carmen; Miriam; Yurena	Mario; Miriam; Yurena	Miriam; Víctor; Yurena	Dulce; Víctor; Yurena	Dulce; Paco; Yurena	Paco; Steisy; Yurena	Carla; Paco; Steisy					
Exile Island Eliminated			Dioni; Most votes to eliminate	M.ª Carmen; Most votes to eliminate	Mario; Most votes to eliminate	Miriam; Most votes to eliminate	Víctor; Most votes to eliminate	Dulce; Most votes to eliminate	Yurena; Most votes to eliminate	Carla; Most votes to eliminate					
Exile Island Eliminated			Dioni; Most votes to eliminate	Cristian; Most votes to eliminate	Mario; Most votes to eliminate	Miriam; Most votes to eliminate	Víctor; Most votes to eliminate	Dulce; Most votes to eliminate	Yurena; Most votes to eliminate	Paco; Most votes to eliminate					

- Contestant was fake evicted and sent to exile island.
- Contestant was immune
- Contestant was leader and whoever they nominated would automatically face elimination (Immune)
- Contestant was nominated

=== Notes ===
- ^Note 1: Contestants were split in two tribes, Fire and Water. From each tribe were nominated two contestants.
- ^Note 2: Mila and Víctor were tied with 1 vote and Team Water had to break it, nominating Víctor.
- ^Note 3: Yurena was fake evicted and sent to exile island.
- ^Note 4: As the winners of the immunity challenge, Cristian and Jorge were given the power to name a nominee. Dulce and M.ª Carmen were tied with 2 votes and Jorge had to break it, nominating Dulce.
- ^Note 5: Miriam was fake evicted and sent to exile island.
- ^Note 6: Suso was swapped of team.
- ^Note 7: As the winners of the immunity challenge, Jorge and Suso were given the power to name a nominee. Dulce and Víctor were tied with 3 votes and Jorge had to break it, nominating Víctor. Cristian and Mario were tied with 2 votes and Suso had to break it, nominating Mario.
- ^Note 8: Dioni was fake evicted and sent to exile island.
- ^Note 9: Dioni was officially evicted by a vote to eliminate.
- ^Note 10: Dulce was swapped of team.
- ^Note 11: As the winners of the immunity challenge, Carla and Yola were given the power to name a nominee.
- ^Note 12: M.ª Carmen and Cristian were fake evicted and sent to exile island.
- ^Note 13: M.ª Carmen and Cristian were officially evicted by a vote to eliminate.
- ^Note 14: As the winners of the immunity challenge, Jorge and Steisy were given the power to name a nominee. Mario and Suso were tied with 2 votes and Steisy had to break it, nominating Mario.
- ^Note 15: Mario was fake evicted and sent to exile island.
- ^Note 16: Mario was officially evicted by a vote to eliminate.
- ^Note 17: As the winners of the immunity challenge, Carla and Yola were given the power to name a nominee.
- ^Note 18: Dulce and Suso were punished with 2 points extra in the nominations because of breaking the rules.
- ^Note 19: Víctor was fake evicted and sent to exile island.
- ^Note 20: Miriam was officially evicted by a vote to eliminate.
- ^Note 21: Both tribes merged in just one tribe.
- ^Note 22: As the winner of the immunity challenge, Jorge was given the power to name a nominee.
- ^Note 23: Dulce was fake evicted and sent to exile island.
- ^Note 24: Víctor was officially evicted by a vote to eliminate.
- ^Note 25: As the winner of the immunity challenge, Carla was given the power to name a nominee. Mila, Suso and Yola were tied with 2 votes and Carla had to break it, nominating Suso and Yola.
- ^Note 26: Paco was fake evicted and sent to exile island.
- ^Note 27: Dulce was officially evicted by a vote to eliminate.
- ^Note 28: Jorge won the right to give two extra points in the nominations. He gave them to Yola.
- ^Note 29: As the winner of the immunity challenge, Jorge was given the power to name a nominee. Carla and Yola were tied with 2 votes and Jorge had to break it, nominating Yola.
- ^Note 30: Steisy was fake evicted and sent to exile island.
- ^Note 31: Yurena was officially evicted by a vote to eliminate.
- ^Note 32: As the winner of the immunity challenge, Jorge was given the power to name a nominee. Carla and Suso were tied with 2 votes and Jorge had to break it, nominating Carla.
- ^Note 33: Carla was fake evicted and sent to exile island.
- ^Note 34: Carla and Paco were officially evicted by a vote to eliminate.
- ^Note 35: Steisy came back to the game as part of the end of exile island twist, she was automatically nominated.
- ^Note 36: As the winner of the immunity challenge, Jorge was given the power to name a nominee.
- ^Note 37: As the winner of the immunity challenge, Jorge was given the power to name a nominee.
