= Coordinadora Reusenca Independent =

Reus Independent Coordinator Coordinadora Reusenca Independent
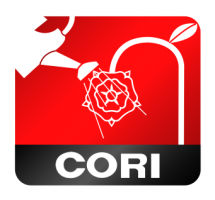
- President: Ariel Santamaria
- Secretary-General: Cori Alegre Llaberia
- Founded: 2003
- Headquarters: Pl. Mercadal, 1 entresòl, Reus
- Ideology: Joke party Juantxism

Website
- www.cori.cat

The Coordinadora Reusenca Independent (Catalan pronunciation: [ku.uɾðinəˈðoɾə rəwˈsɛŋkəjndəpənˈden], literal translation: "Reus Independent Coordinator") or Cori is a political party based in Reus, Catalonia, Spain. It was formed in 2003 and stood lists of candidates in municipal elections of 2003. 2007 and 2011. It obtained its first seat on the Ajuntament (city council) of Reus in 2007.

The party is led by Ariel Santamaria, who is also its sole city councillor (regidor). Santamaria has gained a certain notoriety for attending council meetings dressed as Elvis Presley.

== Political philosophy ==
The official philosophy of the Cori is Juantxism, or "being a Juantxi": its 2003 campaign slogan was "put another Juantxi in City Hall" (Catalan: Posa un altre Juantxi a l'ajuntament). Juantxi (Catalan pronunciation: [xuˈaɲtʃi]) is a term in Reus slang: according to the Cori, it refers either to "an action which is grotesque or ridiculous" or to "a grotesque person who has certain delusions of importance".

== Policy initiatives ==
=== Municipal sexodrome ===
One of the first policy initiatives of the Cori after gaining its seat on the Reus city council was to propose the construction of a "sexodrome" in the city's technology park. The proposed structure was to include bars and discos, along with "spaces for couples, groups and veritable orgies". The Cori pointed out that, as well as providing jobs and leisure opportunities for Reus residents, the sexodrome would be a major tourist attraction. The proposal failed to pass the city council, in part because the Cori were unable to say how much it would cost to build and run the sexodrome.

=== Sagrada Família ===
In the council meeting of 30 November 2007, the Cori proposed that the Sagrada Família, the best known of the architectural works of Antoní Gaudí, be moved stone-by-stone from Barcelona to Reus. The justification for the proposed move was the possible danger to the Sagrada Família from construction work on a new rail tunnel beneath Barcelona, and also "so that Reus can finally have its own Gaudí monument and that we can regain the slogan 'Reus, Paris and London of the 21st century' that is: 'Sagrada Família, Eiffel Tower and Big Ben'".

=== Political history ===
The Cori ran for the first time to Reus's local elections in 2003, failing to get a seat after getting only 3'24% of the overall vote, below the threshold of 5% required to get a seat according to Spain's local electoral law. In 2007 local elections, however, the party gained a seat after securing 1.831 votes, a 5'05% of the overall vote. In 2010 the party ran for the first time to the Catalan parliamentary election, with Santamaria running as head of the party in Barcelona's province instead of Tarragona, Reus's province. The number two spot in Barcelona's list for the Cori was Miguel Brau Gou, a 77-year-old transvestite, widely known in Spain with the name Carmen de Mairena. The Cori did not get the 3% of the vote in Barcelona's province, failing to reach the threshold required in Catalonia's electoral law in order to get a seat. Finally, the party lost its seat in Reus's local council in Spain's 2011 local elections. Early recounts of the vote had given Cori a number of votes above the 5% threshold, but after a protest filed by the extremist Plataforma per Catalunya a new recount was made validating votes that had been initially considered spoilt, thus making the Cori's total number of votes (1.885) a 4'99% of the overall. Ariel Santamaria announced that he would run again as head of the Cori for Reus's local elections in 2015.
