= Toni Cruz =

Spanish producer and singer (1946–2025)

Cruz in interview on TV3 in 2022

Antonio Cruz Llauna (14 July 1946 – 11 July 2025), known as Toni Cruz, was a Spanish television producer and singer. He was a member of the musical group La Trinca.

== Life and career ==
Cruz was born 14 July 1946 in Girona, and relocated to Canet de Mar as a teenager, where he met Josep Maria Mainat, with whom he would associate for the rest of his professional career.

During the mid-1960s, the two formed the musical group The Blue Cabrits. In 1968, Miquel Àngel Pasqual joined the project and La Trinca was born, one of the musical groups with the greatest impact in Catalonia during the 1970s. In the 1980s, the band established themselves throughout Spain, appearing on national television.

La Trinca separated at the beginning of the 1990s, Cruz, together with Mainat, dedicated himself to the world of television production, through the production company Gestmusic, which they founded in 1987. Gestmusic would later be integrated into Endemol, and Cruz was appointed President of Endemol-Spain. For nearly two decades, Cruz was at the helm of one of the production companies that has set the course of commercial television in Spain, through emblematic programs such as La parodia nacional, Crónicas Marcianas and, above all, Operación Triunfo and Eurojunior.

Cruz died on 11 July 2025, at the age of 78.
