= Martí Galindo =

Spanish theatre actor (1937–2019)

- Born: Martí Galindo Girol; May 21, 1937; Barcelona, Spain
- Died: March 3, 2019 (aged 81); Barcelona, Spain
- Occupation: Actor
- Years active: 1960s–2002

Martí Galindo Girol (May 21, 1937 – March 3, 2019) was a Spanish theatre actor, who became best known as a collaborator of the television programme Crónicas marcianas, in which he starred from 1997 to 2002.

== Biography ==
Due to his short height he usually played the role of children in plays. In 1986 he played the role of Martí, the book eater vampire in the TV programme Planeta imaginario on TVE. He also appeared in comedy sketches in the programme Ahí te quiero ver. From 1997 to 2002 he became well known in Spain for appearing on the late-night show Crónicas marcianas.

The show's presenter, Xavier Sardà, knew Galindo through his sister Rosa María, and knowing his roles as children, Galindo was asked to appear like a Martian on the show. "Señor Galindo", as he became known, retired from the show as Crónicas enjoyed its best success: he surprised his former co-star Sardà on the chat show ¡Qué tiempo tan feliz! in 2017 in what became his final TV appearance.

== Theatre ==
- 1963. El hombre, la bestia y la virtud by Luigi Pirandello.
- 1985. La desaparición de Wendy by Josep Maria Benet y Jornet.
- 1991. Snoopy (musical), directed by Ricard Reguant.
