= Carmen Hornillos =

Journalist and television presenter

- Born: María del Carmen Hornillos Baudo; 16 June 1962; Torrelavega, Cantabria, Spain
- Died: 4 July 2014 (aged 52); Torrelavega, Cantabria, Spain
- Occupations: TV presenter, journalist

María del Carmen Hornillos Baudo (16 June 1962 – 4 July 2014) was a Spanish journalist and television presenter.

== Biography ==
Born in Torrelavega, Cantabria, Hornillos began her career in the journal Diario 16, where she was in charge of culture and sports. However, her career was more linked to tabloid journalism and gossip columns. She debuted on television in Antena 3 in the program Todo va bien, and continued as a talk guest in other programs such as Quédate conmigo or Día a día (both in Telecinco).

Her best known work was from 2000-05 on the late night programme Crónicas marcianas. Between 2004-08 she presented in Madrid at Canal 7's Corazón del milenio, a celebrity-reporting program created by Carlos Ferrando. This program, despite being in a local station, became quite popular due to appearing in Sé lo que hicisteis... where they humorously commented on the mistakes made by Hornillos. From 2010 until she could no longer work, she collaborated on the program of Telecinco ¡Qué tiempo tan feliz!.

== Death ==
Hornillos died in Torrelavega, Cantabria, on 4 July 2014, aged 52, following a battle with cancer.
