= La Selva de los FamoS.O.S. =

- Season 3
- Presented by: Nuria Roca
- No. of days: 57
- No. of castaways: 17
- Winner: José Antonio Canales Rivera
- Runner-up: Miki Oca
- Location: Manaus, Brazil
- No. of episodes: 16

Release
- Original network: Antena 3
- Original release: January 14 – March 10, 2004

Season chronology
- ← Previous; La Isla de los FamoS.O.S. 2 Next → Aventura en África

La Selva de los FamoS.O.S. is the third season of the show La isla de los famoS.O.S. and the fifth overall season of Supervivientes to air in Spain. It was broadcast on Antena 3 from January 14, 2004 to March 10, 2004. This season took place in Brazil.

== Season summary ==
With this season the tribes were initially divided into two tribes based on gender. Following the third elimination, the tribes were shuffled into the North and South teams. Along with this twist, a joker, Leticia Sabater, was added to the game following the fifth elimination and was hidden and given immunity until the merge. When the tribes merged into the one tribe following the seventh elimination there were ten contestants left in the game. When it came time for the final seven, previously eliminated contestant Laura Manzanedo was voted back in the game by her fellow contestants. Ultimately, it was bullfighter José "Canales" Rivera who won this season over water polo player Miguel "Miki" Oca and singer-songwriter José Manuel Soto and took home the €60,000 grand prize.

== Finishing order ==
Contestant	Famous for	Original tribe	Tribal swap	Merge tribe	Finish
Guillermo Furiase; 56, Buenos Aires	Lolita Flores's ex-husband	Men	None	None	1st Voted Out; Day 5
Elsa Olsen; 29, Madrid	Model & television host	Women	None	None	2nd Voted Out; Day 8
Alberto Comesaña; 42, Vigo	Amistades Peligrosas singer	Men	None	None	3rd Voted Out; Day 12
Peio Ruiz Cabestany; 41, San Sebastián	Former professional cyclist	Men	North Team	None	4th Voted Out; Day 15
Silvia Tortosa; 56, Barcelona	Actress & television host	Women	South Team	None	5th Voted Out; Day 19
Eugenia Santana; 29, Las Palmas	Miss Spain 1992 & television host	Women	South Team	None	6th Voted Out; Day 22
Luis Lorenzo Crespo; 38, Madrid	Actor & television host	Men	North Team	None	7th Voted Out; Day 26
Sylvia Pantoja; 34, Sevilla	Singer	Women	South Team	Merged Tribe	8th Voted Out; Day 28
Charo Reina; 43, Sevilla	Actress & singer	Women	North Team	Merged Tribe	10th Voted Out; Day 36
Leticia Sabater; 37, Barcelona	Television host			Merged Tribe	11th Voted Out; Day 40
Bigote Arrocet; 54, Buenos Aires	Actor & comedian	Men	South Team	Merged Tribe	12th Voted Out; Day 43
Veruska Ramírez; 24, Caracas	Miss Venezuela 1997	Women	North Team	Merged Tribe	13th Voted Out; Day 47
Laura Manzanedo; 27, Madrid	Actress & radio presenter	Women	South Team	Merged Tribe	9th Voted Out; Day 33; 14th Voted Out; Day 49
Blanca Fernández-Ochoa; 40, Madrid	Olympic Alpine ski medalist	Women	North Team	Merged Tribe	15th Voted Out; Day 49
José Manuel Soto; 42, Sevilla	Singer	Men	South Team	Merged Tribe	Third Place; Day 56
Miki Oca; 33, Madrid	Olympic Waterpolo medalist	Men	North Team	Merged Tribe	Runner-Up; Day 56
José Antonio Canales Rivera; 29, Cádiz	Bullfighter	Men	South Team	Merged Tribe	Sole Survivor; Day 56

== Nominations table ==
	Round 1	R. 2	R. 3	R. 4	R. 5	R. 6	R. 7	R. 8	R. 9	R. 10	R. 11	R. 12	R. 13	R. 14	R. 15	Final	
Canales	Guillermo	Immune	Peio	Immune	Silvia.T	Laura	Immune	Veruska	Laura	Veruska	Leticia	Bigote	Veruska	Laura	Blanca	Sole Survivor (Day 56)	
Miki	Guillermo	Immune	Alberto	Luis	Immune	Immune	Luis	Silvia	Canales	Veruska	Leticia	Canales	Canales	Canales	José Manuel	Runner-Up (Day 56)	
José Manuel	Guillermo	Immune	Peio	Immune	Silvia.T	Laura	Immune	Veruska	Laura	Veruska	Leticia	Bigote	Veruska	Laura	Blanca	Third; Place (Day 56)	
Blanca	Immune	Elsa	Immune	Luis	Immune	Immune	Luis	Silvia	Canales	Leticia	Leticia	Canales	Veruska	Canales	José Manuel	Eliminated (Day 49)	
Laura	Immune	Elsa	Immune	Immune	Eugenia	Eugenia	Immune	Silvia	Canales	Eliminated (Day 33)	Exempt	Canales	Veruska	Canales	Eliminated (Day 49)		
Veruska	Immune	Elsa	Immune	Luís	Immune	Immune	Miki	Bigote	Canales	Charo	Leticia	Canales	José Manuel	Eliminated (Day 46)			
Bigote	Alberto	Immune	Alberto	Immune	Silvia.T	Eugenia	Immune	Veruska	Canales	Charo	Leticia	Canales	Eliminated (Day 43)				
Leticia	not in the jungle					Immune	Miki*	Veruska	Canales	Bigote	Bigote	Eliminated (Day 40)					
Charo	Immune	Elsa	Immune	Veruska	Immune	Immune	Veruska	Veruska	Canales	Veruska	Eliminated (Day 36)						
Silvia P.	Immune	Elsa	Immune	Immune	Silvia.T	Laura	Immune	Veruska	Eliminated (Day 29)								
Luis	Guillermo	Immune	Alberto	Veruska	Immune	Immune	Miki	Eliminated (Day 26)									
Eugenia	Immune	Elsa	Immune	Immune	Silvia.T	Laura	Eliminated (Day 22)										
Silvia T.	Immune	Elsa	Immune	Immune	Bigote	Eliminated (Day 19)											
Peio	Guillermo	Immune	Alberto	Veruska	Eliminated (Day 15)												
Alberto	Guillermo	Immune	Miki	Eliminated (Day 12)													
Elsa	Immune	Charo	Eliminated (Day 8)														
Guillermo	Alberto	Eliminated (Day 5)															
Nomination Notes	See note 1	See note 2	See note 3	See note 4, 5	See note 6	See note 7, 8	See note 9, 10	See note 11	None		See note 12	None			See note 13	See note 14	
Nominated by Tribe	Guillermo	Elsa	Alberto	Veruska	Silvia T.	Laura	Miki	Veruska	Canales	Veruska	Leticia	Canales	Veruska	Canales	José Manuel		
Nominated by 1st nominee	Alberto	Charo	Miki	Peio	Bigote	Eugenia	Luis	Silvia P.	Laura	Charo	Bigote	Bigote	José Manuel	Laura	Blanca		
Nominated	Alberto; Guillermo	Charo; Elsa	Alberto; Miki	Peio; Veruska	Bigote; Silvia T.	Eugenia; Laura	Luis; Miki	Silvia P. Veruska	Canales; Laura	Charo; Veruska	Bigote; Leticia	Bigote; Canales	José Manuel; Veruska	Canales; Laura	Blanca; José Manuel	Canales; José Manuel; Miki	
Eliminated	Guillermo; 61% to eliminate	Elsa; 82% to eliminate	Alberto; 66% to eliminate	Peio; 53% to eliminate	Silvia T. 84% to eliminate	Eugenia; 91% to eliminate	Luis; 71% to eliminate	Silvia P. 53% to eliminate	Laura; 56.8% to eliminate	Charo; 83% to eliminate	Leticia; 76% to eliminate	Bigote; 67% to eliminate	Veruska; 71% to eliminate	Laura; 70% to eliminate	Blanca; Most votes to eliminate	José Manuel; 23% to win (out of 3)	Miki; 37% to win
Eliminated	Guillermo; 61% to eliminate	Elsa; 82% to eliminate	Alberto; 66% to eliminate	Peio; 53% to eliminate	Silvia T. 84% to eliminate	Eugenia; 91% to eliminate	Luis; 71% to eliminate	Silvia P. 53% to eliminate	Laura; 56.8% to eliminate	Charo; 83% to eliminate	Leticia; 76% to eliminate	Bigote; 67% to eliminate	Veruska; 71% to eliminate	Laura; 70% to eliminate	Blanca; Most votes to eliminate	José Manuel; 23% to win (out of 3)	Canales; 63% to win

- ^Note 1: The contestants were split in two tribes, Men and Women. Women tribe won the immunity challenge.
- ^Note 2: Men tribe won the immunity challenge.
- ^Note 3: Women tribe won the immunity challenge.
- ^Note 4: The contestants were split in two tribes, North and South. South tribe won the immunity challenge.
- ^Note 5: There was a tie between Luís and Veruska, Alberto the eliminated contestant broke the tie choosing Veruska as first nominee.
- ^Note 6: North tribe won the immunity challenge.
- ^Note 7: North tribe won the immunity challenge.
- ^Note 8: Leticia arrived to the jungle as new contestant and she will be immune until the merge.
- ^Note 9: South tribe won the immunity challenge.
- ^Note 10: There was a triple tie and Leticia broke it choosing Mike as first nominee.
- ^Note 11: The two tribes merged in just one tribe.
- ^Note 12: Laura was elected by the ex-contestants to come back to the jungle.
- ^Note 13: Miki was the leader and had to break the tie. He chose José Manuel as first nominee.
- ^Note 14: The lines were open to vote for the winner.
