= Begoña Ameztoy =

Spanish writer and painter

- Born: 4 April 1951 (age 75); San Sebastián, Guipúzcoa, Spain
- Occupations: Author; writer; painter; journalist
- Relatives: Vicente Ameztoy (father)
- Writing career
- Language: Spanish
- Period: 1992-present

Begoña Ameztoy (born 4 April 1951) is a Spanish writer and painter. She started her career as a writer, but her interest in arts made her combine literature with cultural movements in Euskadi.

== Biography ==
Begoña Ameztoy was born on 4 April 1951 in San Sebastián, Spain. She joined the surrealist-inspired cultural group CLOC, collaborating with other journalists. She has worked as a columnist in El Diario Vasco of San Sebastián since 1992. She has written scripts for TVE programs, and she has worked as a script editor for several TV programs including Crónicas marcianas.

== Bibliography ==
- El Círculo (1991) ISBN 9788479380069
- El Asesino de Baltimore (1994) ISBN 9788479541880
- El Derby Vasco -with Juanjo Valero- (1996) ISBN 9788460555643
- El Ángel (2000) ISBN 9788484330011
- Escuela de Mujeres (2001) ISBN 9788466713122
- Cuarentonas (2002) ISBN 9788408045199
- Amor Caliente, Sexo Frío (2007) ISBN 9788496511071
- El Sueño de Orión (2010) ISBN 9788498774382

== Expositions ==
- 2001 – Luz Azul
- 2005 – Cielos y Tierras. Galería Espacio Arte – San Sebastián
- 2006 – Retratos. Centro Cultural Clara Campoamor. Bilbao
- 2008 – Retratos – Galería Noventa Grados. San Sebastián
- 2009 – Cielos de Praga – Galería Gaudí. Madrid
- 2011 – Geometria del Verde – Espacio Echevarria – San Sebastián
- 2012 – La Vía Láctea – Galería Pedro Usabiaga – San Sebastián
- 2012 – La Vía Láctea – Feria de Arte de Medinaceli. Soria
