= Supervivientes: Perdidos en Honduras (2017) =

- Presented by: Jorge Javier Vázquez
- No. of days: 92
- No. of castaways: 16
- Winner: José Luis Losa
- Runner-up: Alba Carrillo
- Location: Cayos Cochinos, Honduras

Release
- Original network: Telecinco
- Original release: 20 April – 20 July 2017

Season chronology
- ← Previous; 2016 Next → 2018

Supervivientes 2017: Perdidos en Honduras is the twelfth season of the show Supervivientes and the sixteenth season of Survivor to air in Spain. It was broadcast on Telecinco from 20 April 2017 to 20 July 2017.

Jorge Javier Vázquez was the main host at the central studio in Madrid, with Lara Álvarez co-hosting from the island, and Sandra Barneda hosting a side debate of the program. The crew fled to Honduras on 25 March. The first contestant was announced one day prior.

== Cast ==
The first official contestant to be confirmed was comedian Bigote Arrocet, on 24 March. On 15 April, all the contestants were spotted at the airport traveling to Honduras. The full line-up is:

Contestant	Occupation/Famous For	Original tribe	Switched tribe	Merged tribe	Finish
Lucía Pariente; 54, Valladolid; Alba's mom	SASF reservist	Earth			Quit; Day 15
Eliad Cohen; 28, Tel Aviv	Model & event promoter	Hell			Evacuated; Day 18
Bibi Rodríguez; 44, Seville; Raquel's sister	Las Mellis singer	Earth			Quit; Day 25
Raquel Rodríguez; 44, Seville; Bibi's sister	Las Mellis singer	Earth			2nd voted out Day 29
Janet Capdevila; 24, Barcelona	Quiero ser monja star	Hell	Dead Zone		1st and 3rd voted out Day 22 / Day 36
Leticia Sabater; 50, Barcelona	Singer and television host La Selva de los FamoS.O.S. contestant	Hell	Hell		4th voted out Day 43
Bigote Arrocet; 67, Buenos Aires	Comedian; La Selva de los FamoS.O.S. contestant	Hell	Hell	Merged	5th voted out Day 57
Gloria Camila Ortega; 21, Seville; Kiko's girlfriend	Rocío Jurado's daughter	Earth	Heaven	Merged	6th voted out Day 64
Paola Caruso; 32, Rome	Actress and model	Heaven	Hell	Merged	7th voted out Day 71
Juan Miguel Martínez; 60, Castellon	Hairdresser, reality television star	Heaven	Heaven	Merged	8th voted out Day 78
Alejandro Caracuel; 22, Marbella	Instagram model	Heaven	Heaven	Merged	9th voted out Day 85
Kiko Jiménez; 24, Linares; Gloria's boyfriend	MyHyV star	Earth	Hell	Merged	10th voted out Day 85
Iván González; 24, Jerez	MyHyV star	Heaven	Hell	Merged	11th voted out Day 92
Laura Matamoros; 24, Madrid	Television personality	Heaven	Heaven	Merged	Third Place; Day 92
Alba Carrillo; 30, Madrid; Lucía's daughter	Model and television host	Earth	Hell	Merged	Runner-Up; Day 92
José Luis Losa; 43, Albacete	MasterChef 4 finalist	Hell	Heaven	Merged	Sole Survivor; Day 92

== Nominations ==
	Week 1	Week 2	Week 3	Week 4	Week 5	Week 6	Week 7	Week 8	Week 9	Week 10	Week 11	Week 12	Week 13	Final		Total votes
José Luis	Leticia	Leticia	Leticia	Exempt	Gloria	Alejandro	Kiko; Laura	Kiko; Gloria	Laura; Gloria	Laura; Paola	Juan Miguel; Alba	Alejandro; Alba	Laura	Finalist	Sole Survivor (Day 92)	20
Alba	Exempt	Kiko	Exempt	Exempt	Leticia	Paola	Kiko; Gloria	Kiko; Gloria	Not; Eligible	Paola; José Luis	Iván; José Luis	Alejandro; Iván	Iván	Nominated	Runner-Up (Day 92)	13
Laura	Paola	Exempt	Iván	Iván	Gloria	Gloria	José Luis; Edmundo	José Luis; Paola	José Luis; Iván	José Luis; Iván	José Luis; Iván	Iván	Iván	Nominated	Third Place (Day 92)	12
Iván	Paola	Exempt	Laura	Laura	Paola	Paola	Laura	Gloria	Gloria; Laura	Juan Miguel; Laura	Alba; Juan Miguel	Alba; Alejandro	Laura	Eliminated (Day 92)		14
Kiko	Exempt	Lucía	Exempt	Bibi	Alba	Alba	Edmundo; José Luis	José Luis; Alba	Exile; Island				Eliminated (Day 85)			10
Alejandro	Paola	Exempt	Juan Miguel	Juan Miguel	José Luis	Gloria	Kiko; Edmundo	Kiko; José Luis	José Luis	Alba	Juan Miguel; Alba; José Luis	José Luis (x2); Alba (x2)	Eliminated (Day 85)			6
Juan Miguel	Paola	Exempt	Iván	Iván	Gloria	Gloria	Edmundo; Alejandro	Alejandro; Paola	Gloria; Paola	Alba; Paola	Not; Eligible	Eliminated (Day 78)				6
Paola	Laura	Dead; Zone			Kiko	Iván	Exempt	Kiko; Gloria	Gloria (x2); Laura (x2)	Alba; Iván	Eliminated (Day 71)					13
Gloria	Exempt	José Luis	Exempt	Raquel	Laura	Alejandro	José Luis; Edmundo	José Luis; Alba	José Luis; Iván	Eliminated (Day 64)						16
Edmundo	Janet	Leticia	Leticia	Exempt	Leticia	Paola	Kiko; Gloria	Exile; Island	Eliminated (Day 57)							6
Leticia	Edmundo	José Luis	José Luis	Exempt	Alba	Dead; Zone	Eliminated (Day 43)									8
Janet	Leticia	José Luis	José Luis	Eliminated (Day 22)	Dead; Zone	Re-Eliminated (Day 36)										2
Raquel	Exempt	Lucía	Exempt	Bibi	Eliminated (Day 29)											3
Bibi	Exempt	Alba	Exempt	Raquel	Left Competition (Day 25)											1
Eliad	Janet	Gloria	Janet	Evacuated (Day 18)												0
Lucía	Exempt	Raquel	Left Competition (Day 15)								Guest (Day 71-78)	Out (Day 78)				2
Notes	See note 1, 2	See note 1, 3, 4	See note 1, 5, 6	See note 1, 7, 8, 9	See note 10, 11	See note 12, 13	See note 14, 15	See note 16, 17	See note 18, 19, 20	See note 21, 22, 23	See note 24, 25, 26	See note 27, 28	See note 29, 30	See note 31		
Nominated by Tribe		José Luis; Lucía	Iván; José Luis	Iván; Raquel	Gloria; Leticia	Gloria; Paola	Edmundo; Kiko	José Luis; Kiko	Gloria; Laura	Juan Miguel; Paola	Alba; Juan Miguel	Alba; Alejandro	Iván			
Nominated by Leader		Alba; Gloria	Janet; Juan Miguel	Bibi; Juan Miguel	José Luis; Paola	Alba; Alejandro	Laura	Gloria	José Luis	Alba	José Luis	Iván	Laura			
Nominated	Janet; Laura; Leticia; Paola	Alba; Gloria; José Luis; Lucía	Iván; Janet; José Luis; Juan Miguel	~~Bibi~~; Iván; Juan Miguel; Raquel	Gloria; José Luis; Leticia; Paola	Alba; Alejandro; Gloria; Paola	Edmundo; Kiko; Laura	Gloria; José Luis; Kiko	Gloria; José Luis; Laura	Alba; Juan Miguel; Paola	Alba; José Luis; Juan Miguel; Laura	Alba; Alejandro; Iván	Iván; Laura	Alba; Laura	Alba; José Luis	
Eliminated	Paola; Fewest votes to save	Lucía; Fewest votes to save	Janet; Fewest votes to save	Raquel; Fewest votes to save	Leticia; Fewest votes to save	Paola; Fewest votes to save	Edmundo; 24% to save	Kiko; Fewest votes to save	Gloria; Fewest votes to save	Paola; Fewest votes to save	Juan Miguel; Fewest votes to save	Alejandro; Fewest votes to save	Iván; Fewest votes to save	Laura; 47.4% to save	Alba; 39.1% to win	
Eliminated	Paola; Fewest votes to save	Lucía; Fewest votes to save	Janet; Fewest votes to save	Raquel; Fewest votes to save	Leticia; Fewest votes to save	Paola; Fewest votes to save	Edmundo; 24% to save	Kiko; Fewest votes to save	Gloria; Fewest votes to save	Paola; Fewest votes to save	Juan Miguel; Fewest votes to save	Iván; Fewest votes to save	Iván; Fewest votes to save	Laura; 47.4% to save	José Luis; 60.9% to win	
Dead Zone/Exile Island Nominated		~~Lucía~~; Paola	Janet; Paola	Janet; Raquel	Janet; Leticia	Leticia; Paola		Edmundo; Kiko	Gloria; Kiko	Kiko; Paola	Juan Miguel; Kiko	Alejandro; Iván; Kiko				
Dead Zone/Exile Island Eliminated		Elimination cancelled	Janet; Most votes to eliminate	Raquel; Most votes to eliminate	Janet; Most votes to eliminate	Leticia; Most votes to eliminate		Edmundo; Most votes to eliminate	Gloria; Most votes to eliminate	Paola; Most votes to eliminate	Juan Miguel; Most votes to eliminate	Alejandro; Fewest votes to save				
Dead Zone/Exile Island Eliminated		Elimination cancelled	Janet; Most votes to eliminate	Raquel; Most votes to eliminate	Janet; Most votes to eliminate	Leticia; Most votes to eliminate		Edmundo; Most votes to eliminate	Gloria; Most votes to eliminate	Paola; Most votes to eliminate	Juan Miguel; Most votes to eliminate	Kiko; Fewest votes to save				

- Contestant was fake evicted and sent to exile island (Merged) or sent to dead zone and becomes a zombie (Pre-Merge).
- Contestant was immune
- Contestant was leader and whoever they nominated would automatically face elimination (Immune)
- Contestant was nominated

=== Notes ===
- ^Note 1: Earth tribe has the privilege of being exempt from nominations.
- ^Note 2: Paola was sent to dead zone. She becomes a zombie.
- ^Note 3: As the winners of the immunity challenge, Bibi and Eliad were given the power to name a nominee.
- ^Note 4: Lucía decided to leave the reality after her fake elimination, avoiding to face nomination against Paola in the dead zone.
- ^Note 5: As the winners of the immunity challenge, Alejandro and Eliad were given the power to name a nominee.
- ^Note 6: Janet was sent to dead zone. Janet was officially evicted by a vote to eliminate. Paola stays as a zombie.
- ^Note 7: As the winners of the immunity challenge, Alejandro and Kiko were given the power to name a nominee.
- ^Note 8: Bibi had to quit the game for medical reasons. To replace her the eliminated contestant from this week, Janet, would come back to the game. Janet returns to the game as a new zombie. Paola resuscitated and reintegrated with the rest of the contestants.
- ^Note 9: Raquel was sent to dead zone. Raquel was officially evicted by a vote to eliminate. Janet stays as a zombie.
- ^Note 10: As the winners of the immunity challenge, Alejandro and Iván were given the power to name a nominee. As there was a tie between Alba and Leticia in the Hell's team, Iván broke it nominating Leticia.
- ^Note 11: Leticia was sent to dead zone. Janet was officially evicted by a vote to eliminate. Leticia stays as a zombie.
- ^Note 12: As the winners of the immunity challenge, José Luis and Kiko were given the power to name a nominee.
- ^Note 13: Paola was sent to dead zone. Leticia was officially evicted by a vote to eliminate. There was no more zombies.
- ^Note 14: Paola re-joined the group and she was exempt from nominations.
- ^Note 15: As the winner of the immunity challenge, Iván was given the power to name a nominee.
- ^Note 16: Edmundo was sent to the Exile Island.
- ^Note 17: As the winner of the immunity challenge, Iván was given the power to name a nominee.
- ^Note 18: Kiko was sent to the Exile Island. Edmundo was officially evicted by a vote to eliminate. Kiko stays on Exile Island.
- ^Note 19: Alba lost her right to nominate in a task and she gave her nominations to Paola randomly.
- ^Note 20: As the winner of the immunity challenge, Alejandro was given the power to name a nominee.
- ^Note 21: Gloria was sent to the Exile Island and she was officially evicted by a vote to eliminate. Kiko stays on Exile Island.
- ^Note 22: Juan Miguel received 2 extra points in the nominations in a task.
- ^Note 23: As the winner of the immunity challenge, Alejandro was given the power to name a nominee.
- ^Note 24: Paola was sent to the Exile Island and she was officially evicted by a vote to eliminate. Kiko stays on Exile Island.
- ^Note 25: Laura was automatically nominated in a task. Juan Miguel lost his right to nominate in a task and he gave his nominations to Alejandro randomly.
- ^Note 26: As the winner of the immunity challenge, Alejandro was given the power to name a nominee.
- ^Note 27: Juan Miguel was sent to the Exile Island and he was officially evicted by a vote to eliminate. Kiko stays on Exile Island.
- ^Note 28: As the winner of the immunity challenge, Laura was given the power to name a nominee.
- ^Note 29: Alejandro and Iván were sent to the Exile Island and Alejandro and Kiko were officially evicted by a vote to save. Iván survived and returned to the competition.
- ^Note 30: As the winner of the immunity challenge, José Luis was given the power to name a nominee.
- ^Note 31: José Luis won the last immunity challenge and went through the final vote. Alba and Laura were nominated.

== Tribes ==
	Pre-merge tribes			
	Earth	Heaven	Hell	Dead Zone
Week 1	Alba; Bibi; Gloria; Kiko; Lucía; Raquel	Alejandro; Iván; Juan Miguel; Laura; Paola	Edmundo; Eliad; Janet; José Luis; Leticia	
Week 2	Alejandro; Iván; Juan Miguel; Laura	Edmundo; Eliad; Gloria; Janet; José Luis; Leticia	Alba; Bibi; Kiko; Lucía; Raquel	Paola
Week 3	Alba; Bibi; Gloria; Kiko; Raquel	Edmundo; Eliad; Janet; José Luis; Leticia	Alejandro; Iván; Juan Miguel; Laura	Paola
Week 4	Alba; Edmundo; José Luis; Leticia	Bibi; Gloria; Kiko; Raquel	Alejandro; Iván; Juan Miguel; Laura	Paola
Week 5		Alejandro; Gloria; José Luis; Juan Miguel; Laura	Alba; Edmundo; Iván; Kiko; Leticia; Paola	Janet
Week 6		Alejandro; Gloria; José Luis; Juan Miguel; Laura	Alba; Edmundo; Iván; Kiko; Paola	Leticia

== Ratings ==
=== "Galas" ===
Show N°	Day	Viewers	Ratings share
1 - Launch	Thursday, April 20	2,786,000	24.4%
2	Thursday, April 27	2,769,000	24.1%
3	Thursday, May 4	2,912,000	24.9%
4	Thursday, May 11	2,665,000	23.6%
5	Thursday, May 18	2,646,000	23.4%
6	Thursday, May 25	2,927,000	25.5%
7	Thursday, June 1	2,764,000	25.1%
8	Thursday, June 8	3,080,000	27.3%
9	Thursday, June 15	3,090,000	27.9%
10	Thursday, June 22	3,121,000	28.7%
11	Thursday, June 29	2,942,000	27.2%
12	Thursday, July 6	2,708,000	26%
13	Thursday, July 13	2,770,000	27.8%
14 - Final	Thursday, July 20	3,441,000	33.1%

=== "Conexión Honduras" ===
Show N°	Day	Viewers	Ratings share
1	Sunday, April 23	1,993,000	15.7%
2	Sunday, April 30	2,102,000	16.3%
3	Sunday, May 7	2,532,000	19.1%
4	Sunday, May 14	1,968,000	17%
5	Sunday, May 21	2,107,000	15.5%
6	Sunday, May 28	2,296,000	17.2%
7	Sunday, June 4	2,265,000	17.2%
8	Sunday, June 11	2,292,000	18.5%
9	Sunday, June 18	2,020,000	16.6%
10	Sunday, June 25	2,110,000	18.5%
11	Sunday, July 2	2,334,000	20%
12	Sunday, July 9	2,139,000	19.3%
13	Sunday, July 16	1,943,000	18.6%

=== "Tierra de Nadie" ===
Show Nº	Day	Viewers	Ratings share
1	Tuesday, April 25	2,743,000	19.4%
2	Tuesday, May 2	2,281,000	18.4%
3	Tuesday, May 9	2,756,000	22.6%
4	Tuesday, May 16	2,415,000	19.7%
5	Tuesday, May 23	2,453,000	19.8%
6	Tuesday, May 30	2,453,000	20.9%
7	Tuesday, June 6	2,413,000	19.8%
8	Tuesday, June 13	2,476,000	21.2%
9	Tuesday, June 20	2,561,000	21.1%
10	Tuesday, June 27	2,427,000	20.4%
11	Tuesday, July 4	2,226,000	19.9%
12	Tuesday, July 11	2,236,000	20.5%
