= Javier Cárdenas (presenter) =

Spanish singer, television and radio presenter

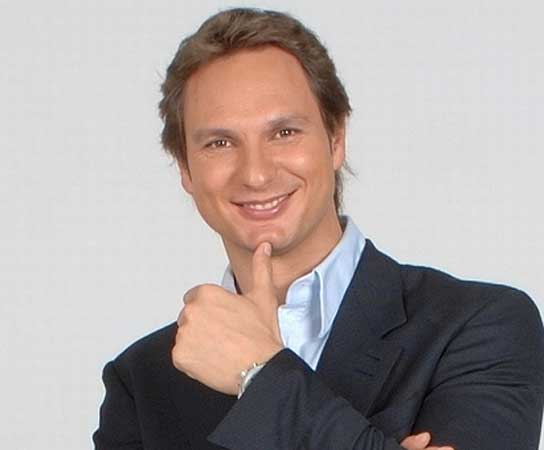
- Born: Francisco Javier Cárdenas Pérez; 18 May 1970 (age 55); Barcelona
- Career
- Show: Levántate y Cárdenas
- Station: Europa FM
- Show: Hora punta
- Station: La 1

Francisco Javier Cárdenas Pérez (born 18 May 1970) is a Spanish singer, television presenter, and radio presenter.

== Radio ==
Cárdenas was nine years old when he began working on the radio program Peques (lit. 'little ones'), on Radio Juventud. At 16, he began to broadcast football matches for Antena 3 Radio. He also collaborated on the show Arús con leche, directed by his brother-in-law Alfonso Arús. From 1990 to 1995, he broadcast football matches, both on Radio Club 25 and M80 Radio (on Cadena SER).

In 1997, he directed and presented Segundos Fuera on Radio España. There were a multitude of radio sketches, with the voices of popular figures of the country. He later developed this in the program On the Attack, on Onda Rambla.

Beginning in 2006, he directed and presented the program Atrévete (lit. 'dare yourself') on Cadena Dial, together with MJ Aledón, Isidro Montalvo, Roberto Alcaraz, Luis Rollán and others. According to the General Media Study (EGM), the program was the second-fastest growing morning show in Spain.

In 2008 Cárdenas was awarded the Ondas Award for radio innovation for combining information, humor and entertainment, organizing a cruise during which a live radio was held over the weekend, with musical performances and competitions and with participation from the listeners.

In March 2008, he gave his listeners a cruise to the Principality of Monaco through the Atrévete program. Artists including Sergio Dalma, Conchita, Carlos Baute, Merche, and Andy & Lucas joined the cruise. He repeated this in 2009 with the Cruise of the Daring.

The show achieved a record audience in 2009, reaching 960,000 daily listeners. On 15 July 2010 Cárdenas made his last appearance on the show, at which point it had more than 1,070,000 daily listeners.

Cárdenas now works on the Europa FM network, presenting and directing the morning show Levántate y Cárdenas. In 2010 the program was reported as having a million listeners. In 2012 it exceeded one million listeners.

In 2015, he was awarded the Antena de Oro award for the best radio presenter in Spain.

== Television ==
Cárdenas first appeared on television in the Força Barça program, which was broadcast in 1989 on TVE2.

In the 1992–1993 season he followed Arús during his time on Antena 3, and became a reporter for the comedy program On the Attack. His unusual interviews, especially with a clairvoyant named Carlos Jesús, attracted attention. Cárdenas used a caustic and ironic tone with his interviewees, with which he tried to expose the eccentricities of their character.

After collaborating on La Parodia Nacional (1996 and 1997) and receiving awards for the best television program on Antena 3 with Constantino Romero, in 1997 he presented the Videos de primera show (lit. 'first-rate videos'). Later, he participated in El candelabro (1999), directed by Tinet Rubira for Telecinco. He substituted for Jesús Vázquez in the Gente con chispa program (2000–2001) and Nunca seremos, both from Telemadrid.

In 2005 he was tried in Arona for lack of respect to a disabled person (falta a la dignidad de una persona discapacitada) he had interviewed. The case was quickly appealed, and through a resolution on 19 January 2010 all involved were acquitted, because before the interview, the disabled person had given his approval to use it, which did not imply any abuse of their rights. In that instance, the court ordered that the accusers pay the costs involved in the initial confrontation. The dispute did not end there and the accusing party appealed to higher authorities, the case reaching the Constitutional Court, where the ruling was in favor of the accusing party, giving a final ruling of perjury and derision to the interviewee.

After finishing Crónicas marcianas, he collaborated again with his brother-in-law Arús and his sister Angie Cárdenas on Tan a gustito (lit. 'so comfortable'; 2006) on TVE, carrying out challenges with celebrities.

In 2007, he presented a gala of Cadena Dial's Spanish-language music awards for artists such as Chayanne, Paulina Rubio, Laura Pausini, Carlos Baute, Alejandro Sanz, and Miguel Bosé for Cuatro and regional channels. In February 2008, he presented the gala again, featuring artists such as Gloria Estefan, Juan Luis Guerra, Juanes, La Quinta Estación, Alejandro Fernández, and Chambao. Also in February 2008, he began to direct and present El Octavo Mandamiento on Localia TV, accompanied by Santiago Urrialde, Joaquín Prat Jr., M. J. Aledón and Beatriz Jarrín, complemented by the reports of Urrialde and Miguel Martín. The show had a 400% larger audience than the network average with 90% less national coverage.

In June 2009, Antena 3 hired Cárdenas to co-present the afternoon program Tal cual lo contamos (lit. 'as we tell it') with Cristina Lasvignes. On the third day he left the program in the middle of the show, renouncing the million-dollar contract he signed, since he felt he could not contribute as he had in other shows. He also declined to present the 2009 New Year's Eve gala on regional networks.

Beginning in October 2016, he hosted the daily program Hora punta (Rush Hour) on TVE's La 1. In July 2018 it was announced that Hora punta would move to one showing per week, but by the end of the year the show was cancelled.

== Film, books, music and others ==
In 1999, Cárdenas participated in the short film Rondadores Nocturnos 2 (Nightcrawlers 2) by Aure Roces.

He has published the book Benditos seáis todos (lit. 'Blessed are you all'; 2000) in which he narrates his television experiences, and the novel Acariciando un sueño (lit. 'Caressing a dream'; 2002).

In 2004, he wrote, directed, produced and starred in the movie FBI: Frikis Buscan Incordiar (lit. 'FBI: Freaks Seeking to Annoy'; 2004), which was intended to be a harsh critique of certain people who make a living from what is known as telebasura (lit. 'trash TV'). It was one of the 20 highest-grossing Spanish films of the year (€928,099 per the Ministry of Education), and according to co-producer Luis de Val had one of the lowest budgets at €200,000. The film was nominated for the Godoy Awards (the antithesis of the Goya Awards) in many categories and won in eight of them, with Cárdenas winning four.

In 2004, he recorded his first album: Siéntelo.

On 5 December 2009 Javier Cárdenas presented Rolling Stone's 10-year anniversary gala, awarding the best artists of Spanish music such as Alejandro Sanz, Miguel Rios, Miguel Bosé, Marta Sánchez, Pereza, Loquillo, Manolo García, Leonor Watling, Macaco, and Joan Manuel Serrat.

In May 2010, he received an Honorary Professor award from ESERP Business School.

On 26 October 2016 he presented the project "One house, one life", a campaign that consisted of raffling off his home to raise funds with the aim of contributing to research into Idic15, a disease poorly known to medicine. The project focused on the study of a Valencian girl who suffers from the disease. Her father graduated with a medical degree to investigate his daughter's illness, and after Cárdenas interviewed the man he decided to give up his home to finance a research team from the University of Valencia.

The raffle, organized by Loterías y Apuestas del Estado, took place in December 2016. As a result, the campaign obtained the €123,000 it needed to finance the Idic15 research. However, the press reported that the presenter only donated €123,000, despite raising more than half a million euros.
