= Laura Manzanedo =

Spanish actress and presenter of radio

Laura Manzanedo (born April 18, 1976) is a Spanish actress and radio presenter.

== Biography ==
Born in Usera, a district of Madrid, Spain, Manzanedo studied Spanish dance at the Real Escuela Superior de Danza e interpretación in the Real Escuela Superior de Arte Dramático of Madrid.

Her most notable role as an actress was as Clara in the TV series: Al salir de clase (Telecinco), where she portrayed a lesbian student who fell in love with Miriam.

In April 2008, she became the first cover star of Interviú magazine. Three years later, in 2011, she worked on projects in the Malasaña neighbourhood.

In January 2009, she began working as a presenter for the program Ponte A Prueba on the Europa FM radio station. Due to her work in radio, she has been dubbed Diva de la Noche.

In the second week of June 2014, Manzanedo was again featured on the cover of Interviú magazine, this time to show her support for the Spain national football team during the 2014 FIFA World Cup in Brazil.
