= Padre Apeles =

Spanish Catholic priest (born 1966)

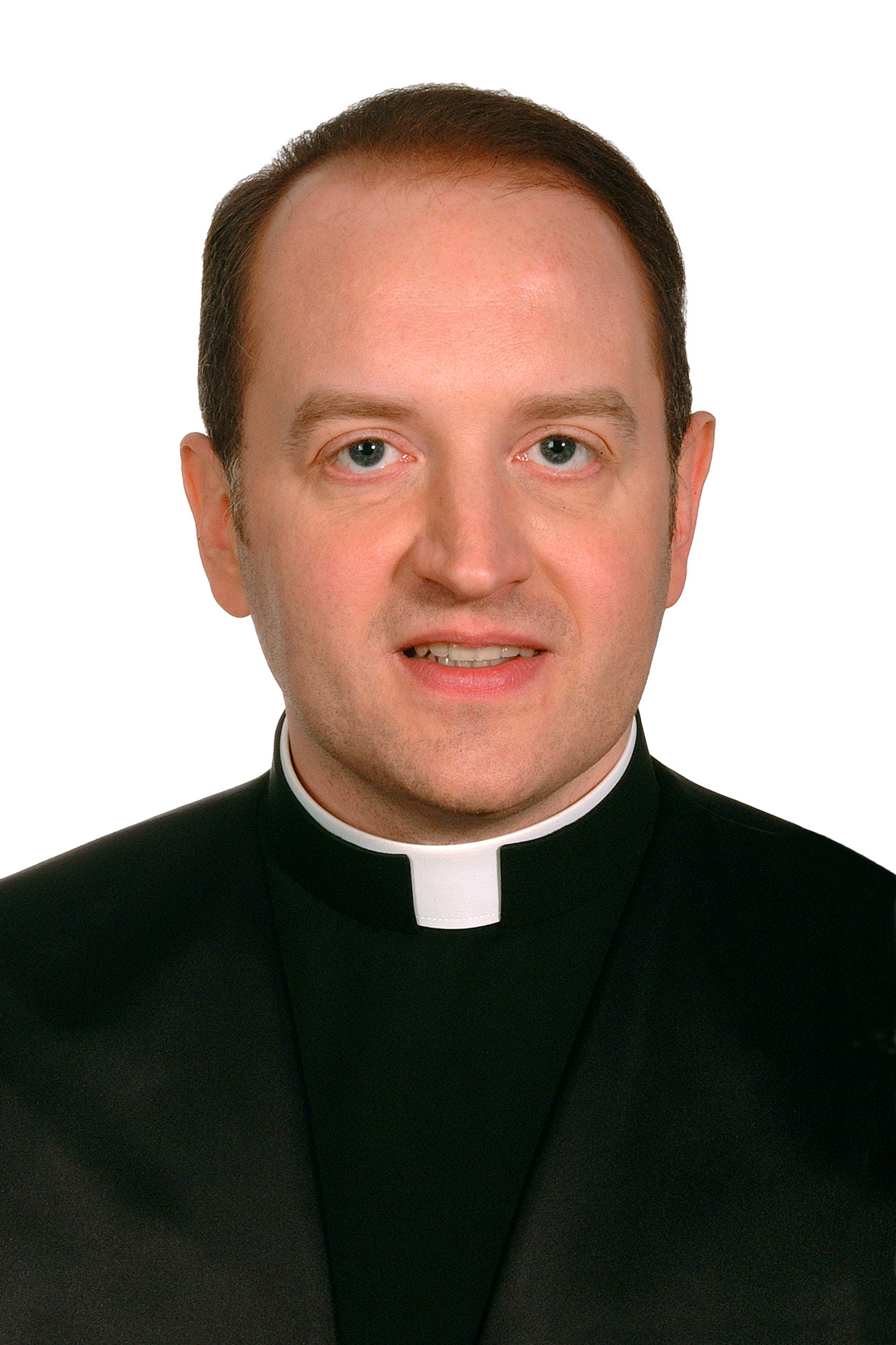
- Padre Apeles in 2004.
- Born: José-Apeles Santolaria de Puey y Cruells; 29 July 1966 (age 59); Barcelona, Catalonia, Spain
- Education: Minor Seminary of Barcelona (Bachelor's, 1983) Pontifical Athenaeum Regina Apostolorum (Ecclesiastical Studies); Universidad Pompeu Fabra (HumL); National University of Distance Education (LLL, HistL); Gregorian Pontifical University of Rome (JCL); University of Barcelona (PolScL, CrimL, BPI); Comillas Pontifical University (JCD (ABD)); Complutense University of Madrid (LLD (ABD)) European University of Madrid (DEA)
- Occupations: Priest; Lawyer; Television personality
- Television: Moros y cristianos (1997–1999); Cita con Apeles (1997); Crónicas marcianas (1997–2005)
- Website: http://www.apeles.info/

José-Apeles Santolaria de Puey y Cruells (born 29 July 1966), better known as Padre Apeles, is a Spanish Catholic priest, lawyer, and television personality.

== Biography ==
Apeles studied at a minor seminary in Barcelona and later took a course at the Balmes Institute. He later went to the Diocesan Seminary of Tortosa and later to Rome, where he was ordained in 1993. Apeles had appeared on radio programmes such as Niñolandia and Peques on Cadena COPE and RNE respectively.

Apeles came to fame on as a regular commentator on Telecinco in the late 1990s. He was well known in particular on Moros y cristianos as a controversial guest, who always appeared wearing ecclesiastical vestments, and offering ironic and witty commentary to which the show's success was partially credited. Apeles' media appearances raised the ire of the Spanish Episcopal Conference which confirmed that he "has never belonged to a Spanish diocese or to congregations based in Spain: [he is] exercising the priesthood outside of all jurisdiction."

Nonetheless, his popularity gained him his own chat show on Telecinco, Cita con Apeles, and co-presented Telecupón with Carmen Sevilla. He followed the host of Moros y cristianos, Xavier Sardà, to Crónicas marcianas in 1997. In the early 2010s, Apeles took a long break from television for health reasons. Apeles spoke openly about his mental health difficulties in a 2017 interview.

Since the height of his fame at the turn of the millennium, Apeles has infrequently reappeared on television, such as on La isla de las tentaciones in 2020. He is a voluntary reservist of the Spanish Army and now lives in Rome, studying and maintaining the history of the Catholic Church. In 2025, he temporarily returned to the spotlight, being interviewed by media outlets on the outcome of the conclave that year.
