= Silvia Fominaya =

Spanish model and television presenter

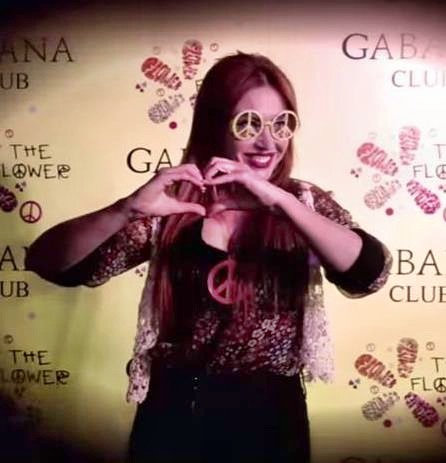
- Fominaya in 2016
- Born: 3 October 1975 (age 51); Madrid, Spain
- Occupations: Model, actress and TV presenter
- Years active: 1990-present
- Spouses: Pedro Riesco; Pablo Alfonso González; Sergi Arola
- Children: 2: Paolo González Fominaya; Hannah González Fominaya
- Website: silviafominaya.com

Silvia Fominaya is a model, actress and Spanish presenter.

== Biography ==
She was born in Madrid on 3 October 1975.

When she was seven years he acted as an actress in Teatro Monumental of Madrid in the play Blancanieves y los Siete Enanitos.

Two years later, Silvia participated in the series of TVE: Segunda Enseñanza directed by Pedro Masó.

Five years later she participated in an advertising campaign for the cosmetics firm Margaret Astor.

In 1998, she presented with Nuria Roca a TV show about animals Waku Waku on La 1.

His national fame came when she became contributor TV program Crónicas Marcianas (Telecinco) in September 2003. Silvia worked there until the end of the program in June 2005.

She made the cover of the magazine Interviú six times. In 2005, she starred alongside Arancha Bonete calendar Interviú magazine for 2006.

In 2009 it was wrongly published in the Spanish Wikipedia her death, and it was announced in Sálvame.

In the fourth week of September 2014 she returned to the cover of Interviú.
