= Crónicas marcianas =

- Genre: Late-night talk show
- Created by: Miquel José; Jordi Roca
- Directed by: Javier Sardà
- Presented by: Javier Sardà
- Opening theme: Crónicas marcianas by Israel Delgado
- Composer: Israel Delgado
- Country of origin: Spain
- Original language: Spanish
- No. of seasons: 8
- No. of episodes: 1,277

Production
- Executive producers: Toni Cruz; Josep Maria Mainat; Joan Ramon Mainat
- Production company: Gestmusic Endemol

Original release
- Network: Telecinco
- Release: 8 September 1997 – 21 July 2005

Crónicas marcianas (Martian Chronicles) (Note: Other than the title, a play on the Spanish word crónicas, which can refer to historical and journalistic chronicles, the program bears no relation to The Martian Chronicles by Ray Bradbury.) was a Spanish late-night talk show produced by Gestmusic Endemol and broadcast by Telecinco from 1997 to 2005. It was directed and presented by Javier Sardà, and had Miquel José and Jordi Roca, with whom Sardá had created La ventana on Cadena SER, as deputy directors and screenwriters.

It is the longest running and most watched late-night talk show in the history of Spanish television. Despite being characterized by some as a classic example of telebasura (trash TV), it won several honors during its run, including one Ondas Award, two Iris Awards, and six TP de Oro Awards.

In December 2023, it received a surprise one-off return to screens with Crónicas marcianas: El Reencuentro, a series of episodes collecting memories of the programme from Sardà and other collaborators on the show.

== History ==
Crónicas marcianas began airing on 8 September 1997 to compete with Antena 3's La sonrisa del pelícano, which was then the ratings leader. In principle, Crónicas marcianas contributed less sensationalism and a softer form of humor, with comedians, co-presenter Martí Galindo, wild animals, videos of pratfalls, and interviews with celebrities such as Cindy Crawford, Marta Sánchez, David Copperfield, Enrique Iglesias, and Ricky Martin.

Crónicas marcianas came to surpass La sonrisa del pelícano in audience, and became the undisputed leader in its time slot after the latter was canceled amid controversy. Boris Izaguirre began appearing on the show to give "semiotic" analysis of celebrity gossip, in addition to performing "transformism" and striptease numbers. New comedians and public figures were often featured, such as Manel Fuentes, Mariano Mariano, Paz Padilla, and Rosario Pardo. Political and social topics were discussed by guests such as Cristina Almeida, Anna Balletbó i Puig, Celia Villalobos, Begoña Ameztoy, Padre Apeles, Loles León, Javier Nart, Enrique del Pozo, Ramoncín, Ivonne Reyes, Juan Adriansens, and Empar Moliner. Francisco Pérez Abellán moved to the program from Esta noche cruzamos el Mississippi to host a crime segment, and Carmen Vijande hosted one on sexology.

For his part, Javier Cárdenas toured Spain to find different characters to interview. Some of these interviews were criticized for mocking their subjects, and Cárdenas and Sardà were ordered to pay €15,000 in compensation after a 2002 segment in which a court found they had committed "illegitimate meddling in the honor" of a young man with a disability. Some interviewees became popular, such as Paco Porras, Leonardo Dantés, Tamara, El Pozí, La Bruja Lola, Carmen de Mairena, and El Mocito Feliz, and they appeared together with Cárdenas in the feature film FBI: Frikis Buscan Incordiar. The controversial singer Tamara (later known as Yurena) had a number one single with "No cambié", and the program also sponsored the release of several music compilations.

In 2000, Crónicas marcianas began to exploit the phenomenon of reality shows such as Gran Hermano and Hotel Glam, to such an extent that many of their former contestants became participants, replacing the previous ones. Examples include Aída Nízar, Sonia Arenas, Jorge Berrocal, Dinio García, María José Galera, Kiko Hernández, Carlos "El Yoyas" Navarro, Silvia Fominaya, Marta López, Pocholo Martínez-Bordiú, Noemí Ungría, and Raquel Morillas. The discussion tables were occupied by Nuria Bermúdez, Borja Hernán, Erika Alonso, Mari Cielo Pajares (daughter of actor Andrés Pajares), Italian nobleman Alessandro Lecquio, Coto Matamoros, Sonia Monroy, Mayte Alonso, Mila Ximénez, and other personalities. Themes such as celebrity relationships, accusations of drug abuse and trafficking, and the practice of prostitution became more prevalent. In this last period, Carlos Latre, Xavier Deltell, and Rocío Madrid joined Sardà as co-presenters.

The program's ratings declined in the 2004–2005 season, as it lost viewers to shows such as Buenafuente. Its cancellation was announced at the end of the season, while it was still the late-night ratings leader. Many of its production staff eventually moved to premiere El Hormiguero in 2006.

In November 2023, Telecinco surprised many by announcing Crónicas marcianas: El Reencuentro, a one-off special of the show with memories of the original from former collaborators, for 12 December 2023. While not considered a full revival, the show won the timeslot and improved Telecinco's late-night slot performance by five percentage points. No word has, however, been given by Telecinco on a reboot of the show based on its favourable performance.

== List of contributors ==
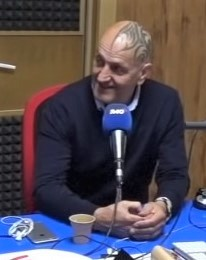
Coto Matamoros in 2018

- Juan Adriansens (1998–2001)
- Erika Alonso (1999–2005)
- Mayte Alonso (2002–2003)
- Begoña Ameztoy (2000–2005)
- Padre Apeles (1997–1998 and 2004–2005)
- Nuria Bermúdez (2003–2005)
- Jorge Berrocal (2000–2003)
- Fayna Bethencourt (2001–2003)
- Daniela Blume (2003–2005)
- Pepe Calabuig (2000–2002)
- Javier Cárdenas (2002–2005)
- Toni Clapés (1998–2000)
- Xavier Deltell (1997–2005)
- Bibiana Fernández (1998)
- Carlos Ferrando (1997–1998)
- Antonio David Flores (2003–2005)
- Silvia Fominaya (2003–2005)
- Manel Fuentes (1997–2001)
- Martí Galindo (1997–2002)
- Íñigo González (2000–2001)
- Borja Hernán (2000–2002)
- Kiko Hernández (2003–2005)
- Carmen Hornillos (2000–2005)
- Boris Izaguirre (1999–2005)
- Natacha Jaitt (2004–2005)
- Carlos Latre (2002–2005)
- Alessandro Lecquio (2001–2005)
- Jesús Locampos (2000–2005)
- Marta López (2001–2005)
- Rocío Madrid (2003–2005)
- Karmele Marchante (1997–1998)
- Mariano Mariano (1997–2002)
- Chiqui Martí (1999–2001)
- Coto Matamoros (2000–2004)
- Sonia Monroy (1998–2005)
- Raquel Morillas (2003–2004)
- Carlos "El Yoyas" Navarro (2001–2004)
- Aída Nízar (2003–2004)
- Juan Carlos Ortega (2003–2005)
- Cristina "La Veneno" Ortiz Rodríguez (2001–2003)
- Paz Padilla (1997–1999)
- Rosario Pardo (2000–2002)
- Enrique del Pozo (2000–2002)
- Carlos Pumares (2002–2004)
- Pilar Rahola (1998–2004)
- Fernando Ramos (2000–2002)
- Nacho Rodríguez (2000–2002)
- Judit Sánchez (1999–2000)
- Mila Ximénez (2004)

== Ratings by season ==
Season	Beginning	Ending	Ratings		Ref
Season	Beginning	Ending	Viewers	Share	Ref
1	1997	1998	1,826,000	22.5%	
2	1998	1999	1,568,000	24.5%	
3	1999	2000	1,548,000	28.7%	
4	2000	2001	1,818,000	33.7%	
5	2001	2002	1,792,000	31.3%	
6	2002	2003	1,871,000	32.7%	
7	2003	2004	1,981,000	37.7%	
8	2004	2005	1,471,000	29.4%	
Average	1997	2005	1,734,000	30.1%	

== International versions ==
The TV format created in Spain, was exported in two countries on the world.

Country	Name	Presenter	Channel	Year aired
Italy	Cronache marziane	Fabio Canino	Italia 1	2004-2005
Portugal	Noites marcianas	Carlos Cruz	SIC	2001
