= Tom Brusse =

Moroccan TV personality (born 1992)

- Born: Tom Brusse; 30 July 1992 (age 34); Marrakesh, Morocco
- Occupations: Television personality; DJ; Producer
- Years active: 2011–present

Tom Brusse (born 30 July 1992) is a television personality and DJ of Moroccan origin. He became known in Spain for participating on reality shows including La isla de las tentaciones.

== Career ==
In 2019 Tom joined dating show Mujeres y hombres y viceversa as a potential suitor. He progressed on the program, and eventually, Melyssa Pinto chose Tom as her official partner. They later began a relationship off-camera and appeared together in the second series of La isla de las tentaciones. Their relationship was featured during the season and received media attention. During the show, Tom became close with another participant, which led to a public breakup with Melyssa.

He also took part on the second season of La casa fuerte, another Telecinco reality show combining living together and endurance challenges. He entered the contest alongside Sandra Pica, with whom he was in a relationship. He was one of the most talked-about participants of that edition, because his love life generated interest among the audience. After the reality show, he continued appearing in debates and specials related to La isla de las tentaciones, sharing his experience and giving his side of the story in 2021 and 2022.

Tom appeared on Supervivientes 2021, on which Melyssa also appeared. At the beginning he appeared to stay away from Melyssa, but she later supported him when Sandra Pica traveled to Honduras to break up with him on air. He finished in fifth place, eliminated after 104 days and becoming one of the most talked-about participants of the season.

He also took part in Telecinco's culinary program La última cena in 2021. This was the televised reunion of Tom and Melyssa. During the show, in addition to cooking together, there were moments of tension and confessions, as their relationship continued to be a topic of media interest.

He also participated in Secret Story: La casa de los secretos season 2 in 2022. He entered along with Miriam Saavedra and Víctor Sandoval as a VIP guest. During his stay in the house, he had highly talked-about moments, such as his closeness with Sara, with whom he shared a kiss that became a viral clip.

Tom also participated in the reality show Solos/Solas season 4 on Mitele Plus, a format where contestants lived together in a small apartment and faced various challenges and activities. There, he starred in several episodes alongside Daniela Requena, with activities such as body painting, visits from friends, and social games.

Brusse also participated in the French reality show Les Cinquante in season 4 (2025). He was part of the red team, along with Martika Caringella, Enzo Sander, Paul, and Sandra. During the show, Tom had a close moment with Caringella, sharing a kiss. Martika was friends with Sarah Lopez, Tom's ex, which added tension and drama to the competition.

In 2025 and 2026, he went to Chile to participate in the reality show El internado: Hasta el más duro aprende, broadcast by Mega. The program mixed living together, cooking, and confinement dynamics. There, he had a romance with reality girl Camila Nash, which sparked controversies and widely discussed debates on social media. His participation was seen as an attempt to internationalize his television career.

== Personal life ==
Before television, he studied hospitality and hotel management at the Les Roches International School.

Melyssa Pinto was his most publicized relationship, which ended on La Isla de las Tentaciones 2 in 2020. After Melyssa, he had a relationship with Sandra Pica, with whom he cheated on Melyssa during the reality show and later also caused controversies on TV programs. More recently, in Chile, he started a romance with the reality show girl Camila Nash during the program El Internado. Their relationship was very exposed on screen, with scenes of jealousy and arguments that generated criticism on social media.

He is currently focused on music as a DJ and producer.

== Filmography ==
=== Programs ===
Year	Title	Role	Notes
2019	Mujeres y hombres y viceversa	Suitor	
2021	Sobreviviré	Collaborator	

=== Realities shows ===
Time	Title	Role	Notes
2018	La Belle et ses princes presque charmants	Himself	Main cast; season 6
2020	La isla de las tentaciones	Himself	Main cast; season 2
2021, 2022	La isla de las tentaciones	Collaborator	season 3 and 5
2022	10 Couples Parfaits	Himself	Main cast; season 5
2022	Secret Story: La casa de los secretos	Himself	Guest; season 2
2023	Solos/Solas	Himself	Main cast; season 4
2026	Les Anges: Miami	Himself	Main cast; season 13

As a competitor
Time	Title	Finish	Place
2020	La casa fuerte	7th eliminateds with Sandra	5th place
2021	Supervivientes: Perdidos en Honduras (2021)	12th eliminated	5th place
2021	La última cena 2	4th classifieds with Melyssa	4th place
2022	La Bataille des clans	Runner-up with Guedj Clan	2nd place
2025	Les Cinquante	5th eliminated	29th place
2025–2026	El internado	5th finalist	5th place
2025	The Cerveau 2	2nd eliminated	21th place
2026	¿Volverías con tu ex? 2	8th eliminated	16th place
