= Gran Hermano (Chilean TV series) season 3 =

Gran Hermano
- Season 3
- Presented by: José Miguel Viñuela

Release
- Original network: Chilevisión
- Original release: 2026 – 2027

Season chronology
- ← Previous; Season 2

The third season of the Chilean version of Gran Hermano was announced by Chilevisión in September 2026. In the days following the confirmation of the new season, José Miguel Viñuela was announced by the network as the show's new host for the upcoming season replacing Diana Bolocco.

The expected premiere date for this season is late 2026, as it is believed that the new batch of HouseGuests will stay during the holidays inside the House. Also, it is believed that the new House will be located in Chile instead of Argentina, as it was during the previous seasons of this installment.

== Format ==
Similar to its preceding seasons, the format is expected to remain largely the same for season three: The show follows a group of contestants, known as HouseGuests, who live inside a custom-built house outfitted with cameras and microphones recording their every move 24 hours a day. The HouseGuests are sequestered with no contact with the outside world. During their stay, the HouseGuests share their thoughts on their day-to-day lives inside the house in a private room known as the Diary Room. Each week, the HouseGuests compete in competitions to win power and safety inside the house. At the start of each week, the HouseGuests compete in a Head of Household (abbreviated as "HOH") competition. The winner of the HoH competition is immune from eviction and selects another HouseGuest to be saved from eviction. On eviction night, the audience votes to evict one of the nominees, and the nominee with the most votes is evicted from the house.

== Casting ==
Chilevisión opened casting for the series alongside the announcement of the show's return. The network announced that, unlike the previous season, only civilian HouseGuests will take part. The network also announced that a massive in-person casting call will take place at its headquarters on 25 October 2026.
