= Oriana González Marzoli =

Venezuelan television personality (born 1992)

Oriana Marzoli
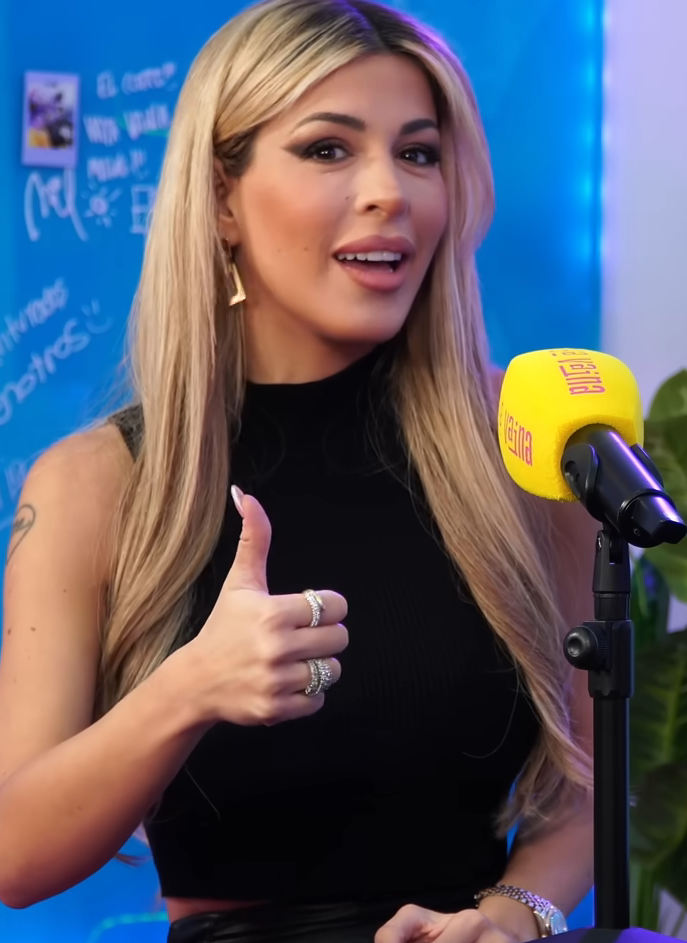
- Marzoli in 2024
- Born: Oriana González Marzoli; March 13, 1992 (age 34); Caracas, Venezuela
- Citizenship: Venezuelan; Italian
- Occupation: Television personality
- Years active: 2012–present
- Employer: Mediaset
- Television: Mujeres y Hombres y Viceversa; Grande Fratello VIP; La casa de los famosos 6

Oriana Marzoli is a Venezuelan television personality. She starred in numerous reality shows in Europe and Americas, and was part of different versions of Big Brother.

== Biography ==
Marzoli was born on March 13, 1992, in Caracas, Venezuela. She moved to Spain in her teens (13 years old) after completing high school and began studying law; however, she soon decided to abandon this career to enter the world of television thanks to her participation in the program Mujeres y hombres y viceversa (MYHYV ).

== Career ==
Marzoli made her first public appearance in April 2012 on the spanish dating show, Mujeres y Hombres y Viceversa, where she worked for several years.

In 2014, she participated in Supervivientes (Survivor), but left the competition. That same year, she joined the Chilean reality show Amor a Prueba. In 2015, she participated in and was announced as the winner of ¿Voverías con tu Ex?.

In 2017, while still living in Chile, she participated in Doble Tentación. That same year, she returned to Spain to rejoin Mujeres y Hombres y Viceversa.

In 2018, she was introduced as a panelist on Supervivientes: Tierra de Nadie (for six seasons, until 2023). Since 2018, she has worked as a commentator on various reality television programs in Spain. In 2020, she participated in La Casa Fuerte, where she was a finalist.

In 2022, she participated in the seventh season of the italian reality show Grande Fratello VIP and, after 151 days of competition, was announced as the first runner-up. In 2023, she returned to Spain and participated again in Supervivientes as a panelist. In September of that year, she participated in the eighth season of Gran Hermano VIP, but left the show two weeks later.

In 2024, she returned to Chile to participate in the reality show Ganar o Servir, which she won. In 2025 she was part of the Mega program "Sangre, Sudor y Gala," a docu-reality show that follows its participants' preparations for the red carpet of the 2025 Viña del Mar Festival. She participated in Palabra de Honor. In May, she returned to Spain to film "Inside Oriana," a documentary series about her own life, broadcast by Mediaset Infinitty.

In February 2026, she was announced as a resident of the sixth season of La casa de los famosos, a Spanish-language American program on Telemundo filmed in Mexico.

== Filmography ==
=== Programs ===
| Year | Title | Role | Notes |
|---|---|---|---|
| 2012–2013 2017 | Mujeres y Hombres y Viceversa | Suitor and Star Advisor | |
| 2016 | Gran Hermano: Límite 48 Horas | Commentator | season 17 |
| 2019 | Una vida de mierda | Unnamed contestant | Web series; episode: «He venido al Got Talent a petarlo máximo» |
| 2020–2021 | Mujeres y Hombres y Viceversa | Commentator | |
| 2021 | Secret Story: Cuenta Atrás | Commentator | Season 1 |
| 2023 | La vida sin filtros | Commentator | |
| 2025 | Sangre, Sudor y Gala | Herself | Documentary from Viña del Mar 2025 |
| 2025 | Inside Oriana | Herself | Web documentary; 3 episodes |
| 2025 | El Loco Amor | Collaborator and co-host | Web show |
| 2025 | Supervivientes: All Stars | Commentator | Season 2 |
| 2026 | En Casa con Telemundo | Guest panellist | |
| 2026 | El Juicio de los Ex | Commentator | |

=== Realities shows ===
| Time | Title | Role | Notes |
|---|---|---|---|
| 2014, 2017, 2023 | (Spain) Supervivientes | Contestant Herself | 22th place; season 9 Guest; season 16 and season 22 |
| 2014–2015 | (Chile) Amor a prueba | Contestant | 4th place |
| 2016, 2026 | (Chile) ¿Volverías con tu ex? | Contestant Herself | Winner; season 1 Guest; season 2 |
| 2017 | (Chile) Doble tentación | Contestant | 6th place |
| 2018 | (Spain) Ven a cenar conmigo: Summer edition | Contestant | 4th place |
| 2018, 2023 | (Spain) Gran Hermano VIP | Contestant | 16th place; season 6 18th place; season 8 |
| 2020 | (Spain) La casa fuerte | Contestant | Runner-up; season 1 |
| 2022–2023 | (Italy) Grande Fratello VIP | Contestant | Runner-Up; season 7 |
| 2024 | (Chile) ¿Ganar o servir? De vuelta al pasado | Contestant | 3rd place |
| 2024–2025 | (Chile) Palabra de honor | Contestant | 26th place |
| 2025 | (Peru) Esto es guerra | Herself | Guest; Season 22 |
| 2026 | (United States) La casa de los famosos | Contestant | 21st place; season 6 |

Videoclips

- Fiera de la Noche (2012) – Rafa Mora
- No Fui Yo (2021) – Sasha

== Awards and nominations ==
| Year | Prize | Category | Nominated work | Result | Ref. |
|---|---|---|---|---|---|
| 2024 | Super Like Awards Chile | Queen Reality | Herself | Won | |
