= Supervivientes: Perdidos en Honduras (2021) =

- Presented by: Jorge Javier Vázquez; Lara Álvarez
- No. of days: 107
- No. of castaways: 16
- Winner: Olga Moreno
- Location: Cayos Cochinos, Honduras

Release
- Original network: Telecinco; Cuatro
- Original release: 8 April – 23 July 2021

Season chronology
- ← Previous; 2020 Next → 2022

Supervivientes 2021: Perdidos en Honduras is the sixteenth season of the show Supervivientes and the twentieth season of Survivor to air in Spain. It was broadcast on Telecinco from 8 April 2021 to 23 July 2021. This season repeated the same host panel from the previous season: Jorge Javier Vázquez was the main host at the central studio in Madrid, with Lara Álvarez co-hosting from the island, Jordi Gonzalez hosting a side debate of the programme and Carlos Sobera hosting a gala in Cuatro.

== Cast ==
The contestants were announced daily by the network.

Contestant	Occupation/Famous for being	Original tribe	Merged tribe	Finish
Antonio Canales; 59, Seville	Flamenco dancer	Shipwrecked Boat	Exile Island	1st voted out Day 22
Marta López; 47, Majadahonda	Television panelist	Pirate Island		2nd voted out Day 29
Alexia Rivas; 28, Ponferrada	Television reporter	Shipwrecked Boat	Merged	3rd voted out Day 36
Agustín Bravo; 60, Cáceres	Television and radio host	Shipwrecked Boat	Merged	4th voted out Day 47
Valeria Marini; 53, Rome, Italy	Actress & vedette	Shipwrecked Boat	Merged	5th voted out Day 54
Sylvia Pantoja; 51, Seville	Singer; La Selva de los FamoS.O.S. contestant	Shipwrecked Boat	Merged	6th voted out Day 61
Carlos Alba; 41, Seville	Chef	Shipwrecked Boat	Merged	7th voted out Day 63
Palito Dominguín; 25, Badajoz	Model	Shipwrecked Boat	Exile Island	8th voted out Day 76
Omar Sánchez; 29, Las Palmas	Windsurfer & television personality	Pirate Island	Merged	9th voted out Day 81
Lara Sajen; 43, Madrid	Artist and designer	Shipwrecked Boat	Merged	10th voted out Day 92
Alejandro Albalá; 26, Santander	Television personality	Pirate Island	Merged	11th voted out Day 99
Tom Brusse; 27, Marrakesh, Morocco	La Isla de las Tentaciones 2 star	Pirate Island	Merged	12th voted out Day 105
Lola Mencía; 24, León	La Isla de las Tentaciones 3 star	Pirate Island	Exile Island	13th voted out Day 107
Melyssa Pinto; 29, Girona	La Isla de las Tentaciones 2 star	Pirate Island	Merged	Third Place; Day 107
Gianmarco Onestini; 24, Bologna, Italy	Reality television star	Pirate Island	Merged	Runner-Up; Day 107
Olga Moreno; 45, Seville	Former Telecupón hostess	Pirate Island	Merged	Sole Survivor; Day 107

== Nominations ==
	Week 1	Week 2	Week 3	Week 4	Week 5	Week 6	Week 7	Week 8	Week 9	Week 10	Week 11	Week 12	Week 13	Week 14	Week 15	Final			Total votes
Olga	Lola	Melyssa	Tom	Melyssa	Valeria	Valeria	Valeria	Tom	Tom	Alejandro	Tom	Gianmarco	No; Nominations	Lola	Lola	Lola	Nominated	Sole Survivor (Day 107)	8
Gianmarco	Tom	Tom	Alejandro	Marta	Alejandro	Tom	Alejandro	Alejandro	Omar	Lara; Alejandro	Lara	Alejandro	No; Nominations	Tom	Tom	Olga	Finalist	Runner-Up (Day 107)	12
Melyssa	Olga	Alejandro	Palito	Marta	Alejandro	Tom	Valeria	Tom	Tom	Omar; Tom	Alejandro	Tom	No; Nominations	Alejandro	Tom	Lola	Nominated	Third Place (Day 107)	6
Lola	Tom	Exile island											Nominated	Olga	Olga	Olga	Eliminated (Day 107)		6
Tom	Gianmarco	Alejandro	Alejandro	Omar	Alejandro	Olga	Gianmarco	Olga	Omar	Omar; Lara	Lara	Alejandro	No; Nominations	Alejandro	Olga	Eliminated (Day 105)			19
Alejandro	Lola	Tom	Gianmarco	Tom	Gianmarco	Valeria	Valeria	Gianmarco	Gianmarco	Melyssa; Gianmarco	Lara	Gianmarco	Nominated	Not; Eligible	Eliminated (Day 99)				18
Lara	Carlos	Alexia -Agustín	Alexia -Carlos	Alexia -Agustín	Nominated	Carlos	Nominated	Sylvia	Carlos	Gianmarco; Tom	Gianmarco	Exile island	Nominated	Eliminated (Day 92)					6
Omar	Tom	Antonio	Tom	Valeria	Valeria	Valeria	Valeria	Gianmarco	Gianmarco	Gianmarco; Tom	Exile island	Eliminated (Day 81)							8
Palito	Carlos	Alexia -Sylvia	Tom	Exile island							Eliminated (Day 76)								0
Carlos	Agustín	Agustín -Sylvia	Agustín -Lara	Agustín -Lara	Tom	Alejandro	Valeria	Sylvia	Omar	Eliminated (Day 63)									1
Sylvia	Carlos	Carlos -Lara	Valeria -Lara	Agustín -Alexia	Nominated	Alejandro	Nominated	Lara	Eliminated (Day 61)										2
Valeria	Antonio	Palito -Lara	Sylvia -Agustín	Omar	Omar	Olga	Alejandro	Eliminated (Day 54)											10
Agustín	Carlos	Carlos -Alexia	Carlos -Lara	Carlos -Lara	Nominated	Nominated	Eliminated (Day 47)												0
Alexia	Palito	Palito -Sylvia	Lara -Sylvia	Lara -Carlos	Nominated	Eliminated (Day 36)													0
Marta	Lola	Melyssa	Gianmarco	Melyssa	Eliminated (Day 29)														2
Antonio	Carlos	Melyssa	Exile island	Eliminated (Day 22)															0
Notes	1, 2, 3	4, 5	6, 5	7, 8	9, 10, 11	9, 12, 13	9, 14	15, 16, 17	18, 19, 20, 21	22, 23	24, 25	26, 27	28	29, 30, 31	32	33	34	None	
Nominated by Tribe	Gianmarco; Lola; Tom	Alejandro; Melyssa; Tom	Alejandro; Gianmarco; Tom	Marta; Melyssa; Omar	Alejandro	Valeria	Valeria	Alejandro; Sylvia; Tom	Omar; Tom	Gianmarco; Omar; Tom	Alejandro; Lara	Alejandro; Tom		Alejandro; Olga	Olga	Olga			
Nominated by Leader	Olga	Antonio	Palito	Tom	Valeria	Tom	Gianmarco	Gianmarco	Carlos	Alejandro	Tom	Gianmarco		Tom	Tom	Lola			
Nominated	Gianmarco; Lola; Olga; Tom	Alejandro; Antonio; Melyssa; Tom	Alejandro; Gianmarco; Palito; Tom	Marta; Melyssa; Omar; Tom	Agustín; Alejandro; Alexia; Lara; Sylvia; Valeria	Agustín; Lara; Sylvia; Tom; Valeria	Gianmarco; Lara; Sylvia; Valeria	Alejandro; Gianmarco; Sylvia; Tom	Carlos; Melyssa; Omar; Tom	Alejandro; Gianmarco; Omar; Tom	Alejandro; Lara; Tom	Alejandro; Gianmarco; Tom	Alejandro; Lara; Lola	Alejandro; Olga; Tom	Olga; Tom	Lola; Olga	Melyssa; Olga	Gianmarco; Olga	
Eliminated	Lola; Fewest votes (out of 3)	Antonio; Fewest votes (out of 3)	Palito; Fewest votes (out of 3)	Marta; Fewest votes (out of 3)	Alexia; Fewest votes (out of 4)	Agustín; Fewest votes (out of 4)	Valeria; Fewest votes (out of 3)	Sylvia; Fewest votes (out of 3)	Carlos; Fewest votes to save	Omar; Fewest votes (out of 3)	Lara; Fewest votes to save	Alejandro; Fewest votes to save	Lara; Most votes to eliminate	Alejandro; Fewest votes to save	Tom; 24,77% to save	Lola; 24,2% to save	Melyssa; 32,52% to save	Gianmarco; 38,83% to win	
Eliminated	Lola; Fewest votes (out of 3)	Antonio; Fewest votes (out of 3)	Palito; Fewest votes (out of 3)	Marta; Fewest votes (out of 3)	Alexia; Fewest votes (out of 4)	Agustín; Fewest votes (out of 4)	Valeria; Fewest votes (out of 3)	Sylvia; Fewest votes (out of 3)	Carlos; Fewest votes to save	Omar; Fewest votes (out of 3)	Lara; Fewest votes to save	Alejandro; Fewest votes to save	Lara; Most votes to eliminate	Alejandro; Fewest votes to save	Tom; 24,77% to save	Lola; 24,2% to save	Melyssa; 32,52% to save	Olga; 61,17% to win	
Exile Island Nominated			Antonio; Lola; Palito	Lola; Marta; Palito	Alexia; Lola; Palito	Agustín; Lola; Palito	Lola; Palito; Valeria	Lola; Palito; Sylvia		Lola; Omar; Palito	Lara; Lola; Omar								
Exile Island Eliminated			Antonio; Most votes to eliminate	Marta; Most votes to eliminate	Alexia; Most votes to eliminate	Agustín; Most votes to eliminate	Valeria; Most votes to eliminate	Sylvia; Most votes to eliminate		Palito; Most votes to eliminate	Omar; Most votes to eliminate								
Shipwrecked candidate	Antonio; Carlos	Carlos; Palito	Alexia; Valeria	Agustín; Carlos															
Transfer to island	Antonio; 72% to transfer	Palito; 73% to transfer	Valeria; 63% to transfer	Carlos; Most votes to transfer															

- Contestant was fake evicted and sent to Exile island.
- Contestant was living in the Ship and voted for someone to go to the Pirate island
- Contestant was immune
- Contestant was leader and whoever they nominated would automatically face elimination (Immune)
- Contestant was nominated

=== Notes ===
- ^Note 1: Contestants were split into two tribes, "official contestants", who lived in the Pirate Island, and "non official contestants", who lived in the shipwrecked boat. Contestants living in the ship, were not eligible to nominate or be nominated as they need to win their place.
- ^Note 2: As the leader of the tribe, Melyssa was given the power to name a nominee.
- ^Note 3: The shipwrecked contestants had to vote for one person to move to the island. Carlos was the most voted and Valeria (as the 1st contestant to vote) broke the tie between Agustín, Antonio and Palito, choosing Antonio.
- ^Note 4: As the leader of the tribe, Omar was given the power to name a nominee.
- ^Note 5: The shipwrecked contestants had to vote for one person to move to the island and another one in negative to stay in the Ship.
- ^Note 6: As the leader of the tribe, Melyssa was given the power to name a nominee.
- ^Note 7: As the leader of the tribe, Alejandro was given the power to name a nominee.
- ^Note 8: The shipwrecked contestants had to vote for one person to move to the island and another one in negative to stay in the Ship. Agustín was the most voted and the Pirate Island contestants broke the tie between Carlos and Sylvia, choosing Carlos.
- ^Note 9: Agustín, Alexia, Lara and Sylvia were automatically nominated as they were the remaining contestants from the Shipwreck.
- ^Note 10: As the leader of the tribe, Olga was given the power to name a nominee.
- ^Note 11: Since this week, all the contestants merged into a tribe.
- ^Note 12: As the leader of the tribe, Gianmarco was given the power to name a nominee.
- ^Note 13: Lara and Sylvia won the right to nominate one contestant each in a task.
- ^Note 14: As the leader of the tribe, Tom was given the power to name a nominee.
- ^Note 15: Lara and Sylvia became official contestants and they were not automatically nominated anymore.
- ^Note 16: Alejandro received one point in the nominations because of a challenge.
- ^Note 17: As the leader of the tribe, Omar was given the power to name a nominee.
- ^Note 18: After a challenge, Olga won immunity and Melyssa was automatically nominated.
- ^Note 19: There was a tie between Gianmarco and Tom and Lara, as the leader broke it nominating Tom.
- ^Note 20: As the leader of the tribe, Lara was given the power to name a nominee.
- ^Note 21: Carlos was forced to leave the island after being injured on day 58. After that announcement, the lines were frozen and due to he received the fewest votes so far, he was allowed to be evicted on day 63.
- ^Note 22: There was a tie between Lara and Omar, and Olga, as the leader broke it nominating Omar.
- ^Note 23: As the leader of the tribe, Olga was given the power to name a nominee.
- ^Note 24: There was a tie between Alejandro and Gianmarco, and Olga, as the leader broke it nominating Alejandro.
- ^Note 25: As the leader of the tribe, Olga was given the power to name a nominee.
- ^Note 26: There was a tie between Gianmarco and Tom, and Olga, as the leader broke it nominating Tom.
- ^Note 27: As the leader of the tribe, Olga was given the power to name a nominee.
- ^Note 28: There was no nominations or leadership this week, because the remaining contestants from the Exile Island are nominated.
- ^Note 29: Alejandro lost his right to nominate in a challenge for the rest of the show.
- ^Note 30: There was a tie between Lola and Olga, and Gianmarco, as the leader broke it nominating Olga.
- ^Note 31: As the leader of the tribe, Gianmarco was given the power to name a nominee.
- ^Note 32: As the leader of the tribe, Gianmarco was given the power to name a nominee.
- ^Note 33: As the leader of the tribe, Melyssa was given the power to name a nominee.
- ^Note 34: Gianmarco won the last immunity challenge and went through the final vote. Melyssa and Olga were nominated.

== Tribes ==
	Pre-merge tribes		
	Pirate Morgan Island	Shipwrecked boat	Exile Island
Week 1	Alejandro; Gianmarco; Lola; Marta; Melyssa; Olga; Omar; Tom	Agustín; Alexia; Antonio; Carlos; Lara; Palito; Sylvia; Valeria	
Week 1	Transferred contestant		
Week 1	← Antonio		
Week 2	Alejandro; Antonio; Gianmarco; Marta; Melyssa; Olga; Omar; Tom	Agustín; Alexia; Carlos; Lara; Palito; Sylvia; Valeria	Lola
Week 2	Transferred contestant		Lola
Week 2	← Palito		Lola
Week 3	Alejandro; Gianmarco; Marta; Melyssa; Olga; Omar; Palito; Tom	Agustín; Alexia; Carlos; Lara; Sylvia; Valeria	Antonio; Lola
Week 3	Transferred contestant		Antonio; Lola
Week 3	← Valeria		Antonio; Lola
Week 4	Alejandro; Gianmarco; Marta; Melyssa; Olga; Omar; Tom; Valeria	Agustín; Alexia; Carlos; Lara; Sylvia	Lola; Palito
Week 4	Transferred contestant		Lola; Palito
Week 4	← Carlos		Lola; Palito
	Merged tribes		
	Lion's Head Beach		Exile Island
	Survivors	Lackeys	Exile Island
Week 5	Alejandro; Carlos; Gianmarco; Melyssa; Olga; Omar; Tom; Valeria	Agustín; Alexia; Lara; Sylvia	Lola; Palito
Week 6	Alejandro; Carlos; Gianmarco; Melyssa; Olga; Omar; Tom; Valeria	Agustín; Lara; Sylvia	Lola; Palito
Week 7	Alejandro; Carlos; Gianmarco; Melyssa; Olga; Omar; Tom; Valeria	Lara; Sylvia	Agustín; Lola; Palito
Week 8	Alejandro; Carlos; Gianmarco; Lara; Melyssa; Olga; Omar; Sylvia; Tom		Lola; Palito; Valeria
Week 9	Alejandro; ~~Carlos~~; Gianmarco; Lara; Melyssa; Olga; Omar; Tom		Lola; Palito; Sylvia
Week 10	Alejandro; Gianmarco; Lara; Melyssa; Olga; Omar; Tom		Lola; Palito
Week 11	Alejandro; Gianmarco; Lara; Melyssa; Olga; Tom		Lola; Omar; Palito
Week 12	Alejandro; Gianmarco; Melyssa; Olga; Tom		Lara; Lola; Omar

== Ratings ==
=== "Galas" ===
Show N°	Day	Viewers	Ratings share
1 - Launch	Thursday, April 8	2.815.000	30,3%
2	Thursday, April 15	2.409.000	26,1%
3	Thursday, April 22	2.350.000	24,9%
4	Thursday, April 29	2.492.000	25,8%
5	Thursday, May 6	2.514.000	27,2%
6	Thursday, May 13	2.333.000	25,4%
7	Thursday, May 20	2.365.000	26,3%
8	Thursday, May 27	2.299.000	26,0%
9	Thursday, June 3	2.217.000	24,8%
10	Wednesday, June 9	2.145.000	23,5%
11	Wednesday, June 16	2.112.000	23,5%
12	Wednesday, June 23	2.222.000	26,0%
13	Thursday, July 1	2.152.000	24,1%
14	Thursday, July 8	2.264.000	26,5%
15	Thursday, July 15	2.375.000	28,1%
16	Wednesday, July 21	2.341.000	28,0%
17	Friday, July 23	2.510.000	26,0%
MEDIA		2.348.000	26,0%

=== "Conexión Honduras" ===
Show N°	Day	Viewers	Ratings share
1	Sunday, April 11	2.282.000	18,8%
2	Sunday, April 18	2.327.000	20,4%
3	Sunday, April 25	2.141.000	18,6%
4	Sunday, May 2	2.209.000	18,9%
5	Sunday, May 9	2.048.000	17,5%
6	Monday, May 17	2.101.000	22,7%
7	Monday, May 24	2.060.000	20,5%
8	Monday, May 31	2.024.000	21,1%
9	Monday, June 7	1.881.000	20,3%
10	Sunday, June 13	1.887.000	21,1%
11	Sunday, June 20	1.899.000	18,4%
12	Sunday, June 27	2.179.000	24,4%
13	Sunday, July 4	1.840.000	18,7%
14	Monday, July 12	2.071.000	20,5%
15	Monday, July 19	1.715.000	21,2%
MEDIA		2.045.000	20,2%

=== "Tierra de Nadie" ===
Show N°	Day	Viewers	Ratings share
1	Tuesday, April 13	1.250.000	11,9%
2	Tuesday, April 20	1.359.000	13,0%
3	Tuesday, April 27	1.356.000	13,1%
4	Tuesday, May 4	1.479.000	14,4%
5	Tuesday, May 11	1.775.000	16,5%
6	Tuesday, May 18	1.607.000	15,8%
7	Tuesday, May 25	1.425.000	14,0%
8	Tuesday, June 1	1.396.000	13,8%
9	Tuesday, June 8	1.448.000	14,0%
10	Tuesday, June 15	1.519.000	15,0%
11	Tuesday, June 22	1.674.000	16,5%
12	Wednesday, June 30	2.010.000	22,6%
13	Wednesday, July 7	2.021.000	27,0%
14	Wednesday, July 14	1.896.000	22,5%
MEDIA		1.587.000	16,4%
