= Gran Hermano (Chilean TV series) season 2 =

Gran Hermano
- Season 2
- Presented by: Diana Bolocco; Emilia Daiber
- No. of days: 105
- No. of housemates: 23
- Winner: Michelle Carvalho
- Runner-up: Waldo Villaroel
- No. of episodes: 86

Release
- Original network: Chilevisión
- Original release: 12 July – 24 October 2024

Season chronology
- ← Previous; Season 1 Next → Season 3

The second season of the Chilean version of Gran Hermano was announced in early 2024, with casting calls being opened in March of the same year. Diana Bolocco returned to host the reality series from Chile, while the housemates will once again occupy the Gran Hermano Argentina house.

The series was then announced by Chilevision to have a 2-night premiere event: with the live move-in on Friday, 12 July 2024, and the first team task to determine who gets to stay in the main house airing on Sunday, 14 July 2024. Due to a mix of low ratings, plus the need of the house getting revamped for the upcoming Argentinean season, this series wrapped on Thursday, 24 October 2024.

On Day 105 (24 October 2024), with all three finalists in Chile, model, influencer & reality TV personality Michelle Carvalho was proclaimed winner with 50.98% of the public vote in the final duel. Farmer Waldo Villaroel finished as this season's runner-up, with advertising executive & reality TV personality Pedro Astorga placing third.

== Format ==
Similar to season one, the format remains largely the same: The show follows a group of contestants, known as HouseGuests, who live inside a custom-built house outfitted with cameras and microphones recording their every move 24 hours a day. The HouseGuests are sequestered with no contact with the outside world. During their stay, the HouseGuests share their thoughts on their day-to-day lives inside the house in a private room known as the Diary Room. Each week, the HouseGuests compete in competitions to win power and safety inside the house. At the start of each week, the HouseGuests compete in a Head of Household (abbreviated as "HOH") competition. The winner of the HoH competition is immune from eviction and selects another HouseGuest to be saved for eviction. On eviction night, the audience vote to evict one of the nominees, and the nominee with the most votes is evicted from the house.

=== Format changes and additions ===
==== Civilians vs. Celebrities ====
For the first time in Gran Hermano Chile history, contestants will be divided into 2 teams that will compete against each other for prizes, benefits and immunity. This time around the 22 contestants will be divided into Civilians and Celebrities. During week 3, the Civilians vs. Celebrities twist was over and it was revealed that HouseGuests would competed in teams, pairs, or individuals.

==== Other casting twists ====
This series of Gran Hermano also immerses itself into classic Big Brother casting twists, as a mother-daughter duo will be featured for the very first time with actress Yuyuniz Navas and her daughter Antonia Casanova.

Also, this series features the classic twin twist. Identical twins, Maria Camila & Valentina Abello will compete as Valentina, until further notice, and will be switching places via the Diary Room every 24 hours while they swap clothes and exchange information. They were the final housemates to be revealed during the live move-in episode. Their twist was revealed on Day 11 (22 July 2024), following the first eviction of the series, and the twins left the house on Day 14 (25 July 2024) as producer's determined their mission was over.

==== Returning contestants ====
Controversial housemate from Gran Hermano 1, Sebastián Ramírez, was featured as one of the original Celebrity housemates during this season.

==== The Red Phone ====
A twist that returned this season is the Red Phone, which requires houseguests to answer a red phone and execute whatever punishments or enjoy whatever rewards Gran Hermano provides to the houseguest who takes the phone call. Here are the instances where it was featured in this season:

- Day 12: Camila A. received a message from a loved one.
- Day 26: Michelle staged a fake exit from the house. She ended up back in the SUM watching the reactions to her staged exit from the rest of the house.
- Day 28: Yuhui had to put a fellow housemate up for eviction. He chose Diego.
- Day 32: Waldo had to choose two of his fellow housemates to become the house's servants for 24 hours.
- Day 33: Camila A. was privileged to upgrade one of that week's Basement housemates to the Main house, and vice versa, downgrading a Main housemate to the Basement. She upgraded Michelle and downgraded Camila P.
- Day 35: Alexandra earned the chance to save a nominee from that week's eviction. She saved Camila A.
- Day 56: Manuel earned the chance to save a nominee from that week's eviction. He saved himself.
- Day 60: Patricio received a message from a loved one.
- Day 90: Carlyn had to put a fellow housemate up for eviction. She chose Yuhui.
- Day 90: Waldo watched his fellow housemates' nominations live from the SUM.
- Day 95: Felipe had to evict one of his fellow housemates on the spot. He chose Miguel, however, this was another fake exit as Miguel ended up back in the SUM watching the reactions about his staged exit from the rest of the house.

==== The Basement ====
This season will feature another staple twist of the international Big Brother format, dubbed in Spanish, El Sótano (or the Basement in English). This additional room will be for the losing housemates of the weekly budget task, where they will live in very minimal and cruel conditions. The Basement space was formally closed on Day 60 (9 September 2024), and all housemates would move to the main house. The first weekly competition would now determine who would be eligible to compete to become that week's Head of Household.

	Day 3–9	Day 10–11	Day 12—17	Day 18—24	Day 25–30	Day 31	Day 32	Day 33—38	Day 39—44	Day 45	Day 46—52	Day 53—60
Camila A.	House		Basement		House				Basement			
Felipe	Basement		House		Basement					House		
Linda	Basement		House				Basement		House	Basement		House
Manuel	House		Basement	House	Basement		House		Basement	House		Basement
Michelle	House		Basement		House		Basement	House	Basement			
Miguel	House		Basement		House				Basement			
Patricio	Basement		House	Basement	House				Basement	House		
Pedro	House		Basement	House	Basement		House					
Waldo	Basement		House				Basement		House	Basement		
Yuhui	House	Basement					House		Basement	House		
Angélica	Not in House					House	Basement			House		Basement
Alexandra	House		Basement	House	Basement		House					
Camila P.	Basement		House	Basement			House	Basement	House			
Íñigo	Basement		House				Basement		House			
Iván	House		Basement		House		Basement		House	Basement		
Antonia	Basement		House	Basement			House					
Carlyn	House		Basement	House			Basement					
Diego	Basement		House	Basement								
Yuyuniz	House		Basement	House								
Sebastián	House		Basement									
Karina	Basement		House									
Valentina	Basement		House									
Daniela	Basement											

==== Freeze & Stop ====
Another returning twist from season 1 is Freeze & Stop (or Congelados in Spanish), which requires houseguests to stay frozen and remain in the same position and spot for several minutes while a special guest, who may be a former housemate or a relative of any of the current houseguests, makes an express tour of the compound on their own and speaks to them briefly. Here are the guests that were featured in this season:

- Day 47: Carlyn Romero (5th evictee), during the day; Titi Magrini (Iván's wife), during a live segment on the primetime episode.
- Day 98: former housemates Antonia Casanova, Camila Power, Íñigo López, and Karina Jerez.

==== Repechage ====
As it was done in Season 1, a repechage vote was held halfway through the series, allowing one or more housemates to come back to the house for a second shot at the game. The 8 former housemates that were up for the public vote were Alexandra "Chama" Méndez, Antonia Casanova, Camila Power, Carlyn Romero, Daniela Bravo, Diego Bazaes, Iván Cabrera and Yuyuniz Navas. The number of housemates that are returning to the game was not initially announced. Voting was officially opened on Day 59 (8 September 2024), during the Week 8 eviction show.

On Day 62 (11 September 2024), Alexandra "Chama" Méndez was proclaimed the winner of the first round of public voting during the Week 9 live nominations episode and re-entered the house the following day. A second round of the repechage was opened that same evening, and only Antonia Casanova, Camila Power, Carlyn Romero, Daniela Bravo & Yuyuniz Navas were the eligible options for a digital-only round of voting, with the winner being announced on Day 64 (13 September 2024). That winner was Carlyn Romero, and returned to the game on Day 66 (15 September 2024) during the Week 9 eviction episode.

A third round was held on Day 67 (16 September 2024), this time around the housemates voted for who they wanted to return. Iván Cabrera emerged as the winner and returned at the end of Week 10, doing so on Day 73 (22 September 2024) at the end of Week 10's omnibus non-eviction episode.

== HouseGuests ==
A total of 22 HouseGuests are expected to move into the house on Day 1 (12 July 2024), with the number of members per team yet to be confirmed. Chilevision began announcing the original housemates during the days before the premiere, announcing 21 of them, with the 22nd housemate being revealed during the live move-in episode.

On July 10, 2024, Chilevisión announced that Gran Hermano 1 contestant, event producer, and reality TV personality, Sebastián Ramírez would return to the reality series as an original contestant this season, with the announcement sparking lots of controversy following his turbulent stint on the show last year.

During the live move-in episode, the final teams were revealed, and the Civilians will compete against the Celebrities, there'll be 11 members of each team. Also, because of the twin twist, Valentina will be the name under which the Abello twins (María Camila & Valentina) will be competing until further notice or they're discovered by another housemate. The twins left the house on Day 14 (25 July 2024) as Gran Hermano determined their mission was over, and the twist were revealed to the rest of the house 3 days earlier during the first Live Eviction of the series.

Chilean media announced by early August 2024, that local reality TV personality Angélica Sepúlveda, would become the replacement housemate for the Abello twins & Sebastián following their planned and/or sudden exits from their show, as the housemate herself spilled it on her social media. Angélica's entrance took place on Day 31 (August 11, 2024) during the Week 4 eviction show.

Iván Cabrera quit the show during a live segment on the episode aired on 27 August 2024 (Day 47). His exit happened following the entrance of his wife, Tiffany "Titi" Magrini, as part of that day's Freeze & Stop task that also involved evicted houseguest Carlyn Romero earlier that same day. Days later, on 1 September 2024 (Day 52), Íñigo López walked out of the house citing mental health concerns, Íñigo's exit delayed the seventh eviction for one day.

Alexandra "Chama" Méndez quit the game on Day 54 (3 September 2024), and her voluntary exit from the game was confirmed by the social media channels of both Chilevisión and the show. Angélica Sepúlveda quit the series on Day 60 (8 September 2024), the same day the Week 8 eviction was meant to take place. Chilevisión announced through their and the show's official social media accounts that on that evening's primetime show, the percentages for that night's eviction would be revealed. For the first time in Gran Hermano Chile's history, no one would be evicted for the week, or the weekly eviction would be reprogrammed, as done in previous occasions.

During Week 9, the repechage process began and 2 former housemates were given a second chance in the game. Alexandra "Chama" Méndez won the first round on Day 62 (11 September 2024), with the second winner being announced on Day 64 (13 September 2024), and that was Carlyn Romero. Also, the day after (Day 63, 12 September 2024) that week's nomination process Linda Marcovich left the house citing personal reasons. Linda later returned to the house on Day 72 (21 September 2024), she later explained that she had a family emergency that made her go home for a few days.

Gran Hermano 1 winner, Constanza Capelli, entered the house on Day 80 (29 September 2024) as a new houseguest. It was later revealed during the Week 11 nominations episode on Day 83 (2 October 2024), that she was a special guest and would leave later during that week.

Proceedings for the final started during Week 14, and it took place by the end of Week 15. Like in season 1, the final three — Michelle, Pedro, and Waldo — exited the house and flew to Chile for the finale. The housemates exited the house in Argentina on Day 104 (23 October 2024), with Day 105 (24 October 2024) having the live finale taking place from Chilevisión's studios in Santiago.

Name	Age	Occupation	Residence	Team	Day entered	Day exited	Status
Michelle Carvalho	30	Reality TV star & Influencer	Región Metropolitana	Celebrities	1	105	Winner
Waldo Villaroel	26	Farmer	Illapel, Región de Coquimbo	Civilians	1	105	Runner-up
Pedro Astorga	36	Advertising executive & Reality TV star	Cajón del Maipo, Región Metropolitana	Celebrities	1	105	Third place
Felipe Thompson	30	Engineer	Vitacura, Región Metropolitana	Civilians	1	103	Evicted
Yuhui Lee	34	Chef & TV Personality	Región Metropolitana	Celebrities	1	102	Evicted
Linda Marcovich	34	Fashion designer	El Bosque, Región Metropolitana	Civilians	72	101	Evicted
Linda Marcovich	34	Fashion designer	El Bosque, Región Metropolitana	Civilians	1	63	Walked
Miguel Martínez	25	Reality TV Star	Córdoba, Spain	Celebrities	1	98	Evicted
Iván Cabrera	41	P.E. Teacher & Dancer	Región Metropolitana	Celebrities	73	97	Evicted
Iván Cabrera	41	P.E. Teacher & Dancer	Región Metropolitana	Celebrities	1	47	Walked
Carlyn Romero	29	Model, Influencer & Cook	Región Metropolitana	Celebrities	66	94	Evicted
Carlyn Romero	29	Model, Influencer & Cook	Región Metropolitana	Celebrities	1	38	Evicted
Patricio Esteffan	42	Entrepreneur	Las Condes, Región Metropolitana	Civilians	1	87	Evicted
Constanza Capelli	28	Gran Hermano 1 winner	Región Metropolitana	Celebrities	80	86	Left
Manuel Napoli	30	Model & Reality TV Star	Madrid, Spain	Celebrities	1	81	Walked
Alexandra Méndez	31	TV Personality & Influencer	Región Metropolitana	Celebrities	63	80	Evicted
Alexandra Méndez	31	TV Personality & Influencer	Región Metropolitana	Celebrities	1	54	Walked
Camila Andrade	33	TV Personality, Influencer & former Miss Chile	Las Condes, Región Metropolitana	Celebrities	1	66	Evicted
Angélica Sepúlveda	43	Reality TV personality	Yungay, Región de Ñuble	Celebrities	31	59	Walked
Camila Power	26	Tattoo artist, Actress & Influencer	Ñuñoa, Región Metropolitana	Civilians	1	53	Evicted
Íñigo López	23	Psychology student & former footballer	Concón, Región de Valparaíso	Civilians	1	52	Walked
Antonia Casanova	23	Influencer	Región Metropolitana	Civilians	1	45	Evicted
Diego Bazáes	29	Aspiring singer	Ñuñoa, Región Metropolitana	Civilians	1	31	Evicted
Yuyuniz Navas	52	Actress	Región Metropolitana	Celebrities	1	24	Evicted
Sebastián Ramírez	37	Event Producer & Gran Hermano 1 contestant	Región Metropolitana	Celebrities	1	20	Walked
Karina Jerez	31	Model	Colina, Región Metropolitana	Civilians	1	18	Evicted
Valentina and María Camila Abello	23	Models & Influencers	Barranquilla, Colombia	Civilians	1	14	Left
Daniela Bravo	27	PR Manager & Influencer	Las Condes, Región Metropolitana	Civilians	1	11	Evicted

== Voting history ==
HouseGuests nominate for two and one points, shown in descending order in the nomination box. The four or more HouseGuests with the most nomination points face the public vote.

Key
– Civilians
– Celebrities

	Week 1	Week 2	Week 3	Week 4	Week 5	Week 6	Week 7	Week 8	Week 9			Week 10	Week 11	Week 12	Week 13	Week 14			Week 15			Nomination points received
	Week 1	Week 2	Week 3	Week 4	Week 5	Week 6	Week 7	Week 8	Day 60	Day 62	Day 63	Week 10	Week 11	Week 12	Week 13	Day 95	Day 97	Day 98	Day 102	Day 103	Finale	Nomination points received
Head(s) of Household	Carlyn & Pedro	Antonia & Felipe	Pedro	Íñigo	Pedro	Linda	Pedro	Patricio	Pedro				Miguel	Pedro	Felipe							Nomination points received
Legacy Vote	none	Michelle	Michelle	Alexandra	Yuhui	Iván	Alexandra	~~Patricio~~	Waldo				Manuel	Carlyn	~~Felipe~~							Nomination points received
Michelle	Daniela, Camila A.	Yuyuniz, Karina	~~Antonia~~, Yuyuniz	Camila P., ~~Antonia~~	Waldo, Carlyn	Camila P., Felipe	Íñigo, Camila P.	Felipe, Waldo	No Nominations	Felipe, Miguel	No Nominations	Iván, Diego	Manuel, Alexandra	~~Manuel,~~; ~~Constanza~~	Carlyn	No Nominations	No Nominations	No Nominations	No Nominations	No Nominations	Winner (Day 105)	38
Waldo	Michelle, Alexandra	Íñigo, Karina	Camila A., Alexandra	Manuel, Michelle	Felipe, Iván	Antonia, Felipe	Íñigo, Felipe	Linda, Michelle	No Nominations	Linda, Felipe	No Nominations	Daniela, Antonia	Alexandra, Manuel	Linda, Felipe	Iván, Linda	No Nominations	No Nominations	No Nominations	No Nominations	No Nominations	Runner-up (Day 105)	30
Pedro	Felipe, Valentina	Camila P., Karina	Yuyuniz, Yuhui	~~Camila P.~~, Carlyn	Iván, Felipe	Íñigo, Felipe	Angélica, Íñigo	Felipe, Miguel	No Nominations	Felipe, Miguel	No Nominations	Diego, Iván	Manuel, Alexandra	Carlyn, Felipe	Miguel, Iván	No Nominations	No Nominations	No Nominations	No Nominations	No Nominations	Third place (Day 105)	12
Felipe	Valentina, Camila A.	Michelle, Alexandra	Manuel, Michelle	Alexandra, Miguel	Alexandra, Patricio	~~Alexandra~~, Patricio	Alexandra, Waldo	Waldo, Pedro	No Nominations	Miguel, Patricio	No Nominations	Camila P., Diego	Waldo, Alexandra	~~Michelle~~, Patricio	Michelle, Pedro	No Nominations	No Nominations	No Nominations	No Nominations	No Nominations	Evicted (Day 103)	61
Yuhui	Felipe, Valentina	Sebastián, Camila P.	Yuyuniz, Camila P.	Camila P., Diego	Iván, Camila A.	Camila P., Antonia	Angélica, Camila P.	Camila A., Miguel	No Nominations	Felipe, Michelle	No Nominations	Iván, Daniela	Manuel, Alexandra	Miguel, Felipe	Iván, Miguel	No Nominations	No Nominations	No Nominations	No Nominations	Evicted (Day 102)		6
Linda	Camila A., Alexandra	Camila A., Alexandra	Camila A., Manuel	Camila A., Manuel	Camila A., Patricio	Camila A., Patricio	Camila A., Angélica	Pedro, Camila A.	No Nominations	Patricio, Camila A.	Walked (Day 63)		Patricio, Waldo	Patricio, Waldo	Pedro, Waldo	No Nominations	No Nominations	No Nominations	Evicted (Day 101)			20
Miguel	~~Valentina, Linda~~	Sebastián, Linda	Antonia, Felipe	Camila P., Carlyn	Carlyn, Felipe	Felipe, ~~Camila P.~~	Camila P., Íñigo	Felipe, Yuhui	No Nominations	Felipe, Michelle	No Nominations	Antonia, Iván	Alexandra, Pedro	Carlyn, Felipe	~~Iván~~, Pedro	No Nominations	No Nominations	Evicted (Day 98)				17
Iván	Daniela, Valentina	Diego, Íñigo	Yuhui, Waldo	Carlyn, Camila P.	Antonia, Waldo	Camila P., Waldo	Walked (Day 47)						Waldo, Manuel	Waldo, Carlyn	Miguel, Waldo	No Nominations	Evicted (Day 97)					17
Carlyn	Michelle, Alexandra	Karina, Camila P.	Michelle, Miguel	Michelle, Manuel	Camila A., Alexandra	Evicted (Day 38)						Diego, Angélica	~~Alexandra~~, Manuel	~~Manuel~~	Pedro, Miguel	Evicted (Day 94)						25
Patricio	Manuel, Camila P.	Karina, Íñigo	~~Antonia~~, Yuyuniz	~~Camila P., Antonia~~	Íñigo, Antonia	Íñigo, ~~Camila P.~~	~~Íñigo~~, Camila P.	Linda, Felipe	No Nominations	Linda, Felipe	No Nominations	Iván, Antonia	Manuel, Alexandra	Carlyn, Felipe	Evicted (Day 87)							22
Manuel	Valentina, Íñigo	Diego, Linda	Felipe, Yuyuniz	~~Íñigo~~, Felipe	Carlyn, Felipe	Felipe, Camila P.	Felipe, Camila P.	Felipe, Waldo	No Nominations	Camila A., Felipe	No Nominations	Iván, Antonia	Felipe, Waldo	Walked (Day 81)								39
Alexandra	Daniela, Linda	Yuyuniz, Linda	Felipe, Yuyuniz	~~Carlyn, Felipe~~	~~Carlyn, Camila P.~~	Camila P., Antonia	Camila P., Felipe	Nominated	Walked (Day 54)	Exempt	No Nominations	Iván, Yuyuniz	Iván, Waldo	Evicted (Day 80)								40
Camila A.	Daniela, Valentina	Yuyuniz, Linda	Yuyuniz, Antonia	Carlyn, Camila P.	Carlyn, Waldo	Antonia, Camila P.	Camila P., Felipe	Linda, Felipe	No Nominations	Linda, Felipe	No Nominations	Evicted (Day 66)										50
Angélica	Not in House				Íñigo, Miguel	Manuel, Iván	Manuel, Michelle	Michelle, Camila A.	Walked (Day 59)													5
Camila P.	Yuyuniz, Manuel	Pedro, Michelle	Patricio, Manuel	Michelle, Alexandra	Camila A., Alexandra	Camila A., Iván	~~Patrcio~~, Camila A.	Evicted (Day 53)														36
Íñigo	Camila A., Valentina	Alexandra, Karina	Michelle, Manuel	Camila A., Alexandra	Iván, Patricio	Patricio, ~~Alexandra~~	Camila A., Waldo	Walked (Day 52)														19
Antonia	Camila A., Michelle	Alexandra, Camila A.	Patricio, Manuel	Manuel, Patricio	Camila A., Patricio	Camila A., Patricio	Evicted (Day 45)															12
Diego	Michelle, Yuyuniz	Michelle, Iván	Manuel, Alexandra	Carlyn, Manuel	Evicted (Day 31)																	5
Yuyuniz	Karina, Daniela	Alexandra, Michelle	Alexandra, Manuel	Evicted (Day 24)																		20
Sebastián	Valentina, Manuel	Manuel, Waldo	No Vote	Walked (Day 20)																		6
Karina	Valentina, Camila A.	Camila A., Michelle	Evicted (Day 18)																			10
Valentina	Sebastián, Camila P.	Left (Day 14)																				13
Daniela	~~Camila A., Valentina~~	Evicted (Day 11)																				9
Temporary HouseGuests
Constanza	Not in House													Iván, Waldo	Left (Day 86)							N/A
Notes	1, 2	3, 4	5, 6	7, 8, 9, 10	11, 12, 13, 14	15, 16	17, 18	19, 20, 21, 22	23, 24			25	26, 27	28, 29, 30, 31	32, 33	34						
Left	none	Valentina	none																			
Walked	none		Sebastián	none			Iván, Íñigo	Alexandra, Angélica	Linda			none		Manuel	none							
Nominated	Camila A., Daniela, Felipe, Manuel, Michelle, Valentina	Alexandra, Camila A., Karina, Michelle, Patricio, Yuyuniz	Alexandra, Camila A., Felipe, Manuel, Michelle, Patricio, ~~Sebastián~~, Yuyuniz	Alexandra, Camila P., Carlyn, Manuel, Michelle	Alexandra, ~~Camila A.~~, Carlyn, Felipe, Íñigo, Iván, Patricio, Waldo	Alexandra, Antonia, Camila A., Camila P., Felipe, Patricio	Angélica, Camila A., Camila P., Felipe, Íñigo	~~Alexandra~~, Angélica, Camila A., Felipe, Linda, ~~Manuel~~, Michelle, Pedro, Waldo	Alexandra, Antonia, Camila P., Carlyn, Daniela, Diego, Iván, Yuyuniz	Camila A., Felipe, ~~Linda~~, Manuel, Miguel, Patricio	Antonia, Camila P., Carlyn, Daniela, Yuyuniz	Angélica, Antonia, Camila P., Daniela, Diego, Iván, Yuyuniz	Alexandra, Carlyn, Felipe, Iván, Manuel, Patricio, Waldo	Carlyn, Felipe, Iván, Linda, Miguel, Patricio, Waldo	Carlyn, Iván, Miguel, Pedro, Yuhui	Felipe, Iván, Linda, Michelle, Miguel, Pedro, Waldo, Yuhui	Felipe, Linda, Michelle, Miguel, Pedro, Waldo, Yuhui	Felipe, Linda, Michelle, Pedro, Waldo, Yuhui	Felipe, Michelle, Pedro, Waldo, Yuhui	Felipe, Michelle, Pedro, Waldo	Michelle, Pedro, Waldo	
Immunity Competition Winner	Camila A.	Alexandra	Felipe	Carlyn	Iván	Patricio	Angélica	Linda		Felipe			Iván	Iván	Pedro							
Saved by HoH	~~Manuel~~	Yuyuniz	Michelle	Camila P.	Waldo	Camila P.	Camila A.	Michelle		Patricio			Patricio	Waldo	Miguel							
Against public vote	Daniela, Felipe, Manuel, Michelle, Valentina	Camila A., Karina, Michelle, Patricio	Alexandra, Camila A., Manuel, Patricio, Yuyuniz	Alexandra, Diego, Manuel, Michelle	Alexandra, Carlyn, Felipe, Íñigo, Patricio	Alexandra, Antonia, Camila A., Felipe	Camila P., Felipe, ~~Íñigo~~	Angélica, Camila A., Felipe, Pedro, Waldo		Camila A., Manuel, Miguel			Alexandra, Carlyn, Felipe, Manuel, Waldo	Carlyn, Felipe, Linda, Miguel, Patricio	Carlyn, Iván, Yuhui							
Evicted	Daniela; 66.36% to evict (out of 2)	Karina; 86.30% to evict (out of 2)	Yuyuniz; 75.67% to evict (out of 3)	Diego; 57.89% to evict (out of 2)	Carlyn; 58.86% to evict (out of 2)	Antonia; 63.4% to evict (out of 2)	Camila P. 70.22% to evict (out of 2)	~~Angélica~~; ~~49.93%~~ to evict (out of 5)	Alexandra; 37.92% to return (out of 8)	Camila A. 51.16% to evict (out of 2)	Carlyn; 48.29% to return (out of 5)	Iván; Most housemate votes to return (out of 5)	Alexandra; 69.83% to evict (out of 2)	Patricio; 60.58% to evict (out of 2)	Carlyn; 57.24% to evict (out of 2)	Iván; 0.98% to save (out of 8)	Miguel; 3.07% to save (out of 7)	Linda; 4.08% to save (out of 6)	Yuhui; 6.99% to save (out of 5)	Felipe; 11.10% to save (out of 4)	Pedro; 22.99% to win (out of 3)	
Evicted	Daniela; 66.36% to evict (out of 2)	Karina; 86.30% to evict (out of 2)	Yuyuniz; 75.67% to evict (out of 3)	Diego; 57.89% to evict (out of 2)	Carlyn; 58.86% to evict (out of 2)	Antonia; 63.4% to evict (out of 2)	Camila P. 70.22% to evict (out of 2)	~~Angélica~~; ~~49.93%~~ to evict (out of 5)	Alexandra; 37.92% to return (out of 8)	Camila A. 51.16% to evict (out of 2)	Carlyn; 48.29% to return (out of 5)	Iván; Most housemate votes to return (out of 5)	Alexandra; 69.83% to evict (out of 2)	Patricio; 60.58% to evict (out of 2)	Carlyn; 57.24% to evict (out of 2)	Iván; 0.98% to save (out of 8)	Miguel; 3.07% to save (out of 7)	Linda; 4.08% to save (out of 6)	Yuhui; 6.99% to save (out of 5)	Felipe; 11.10% to save (out of 4)	Waldo; 49.02% to win (out of 2)	
Saved	Felipe; 33.64% (out of 2); Michelle; Fewest votes (out of 3); Manuel; Fewest votes (out of 4); Valentina; Fewest votes (out of 5)	Camila A. 13.70% (out of 2); Michelle; Fewest votes (out of 3); Patricio; Fewest votes (out of 4)	Patricio; 16.93% (out of 3); Alexandra; 7.4% (out of 3); Camila A. Fewest votes (out of 4); Manuel; Fewest votes (out of 5)	Manuel; 42.11% (out of 2); Alexandra; Fewest votes (out of 3); Michelle; Fewest votes (out of 4)	Patricio; 41.14% (out of 2); Alexandra; Fewest votes (out of 3); Felipe; Fewest votes (out of 4); Íñigo; Fewest votes (out of 5)	Alexandra; 36.6% (out of 2); Felipe; Fewest votes (out of 3); Camila A. Fewest votes (out of 4)	Felipe; 29.78% (out of 2)	Camila A. Felipe; Pedro; Waldo; 50.07% (out of 5)	Antonia; Camila P. Carlyn; Daniela; Diego; Iván; Yuyuniz (out of 8)	Manuel; 48.84% (out of 2); Miguel; Fewest votes (out of 3)	Antonia; 28.22% Camila P. 18.08% Yuyuniz; 2.89% Daniela; 2.52%	Angélica, Antonia, Camila P., Daniela, Diego, Yuyuniz	Carlyn; 30.17% (out of 2); Manuel; Fewest votes (out of 3); Felipe; Fewest votes (out of 4); Waldo; Fewest votes (out of 5)	Carlyn; 39.15% (out of 2); Felipe; Fewest votes (out of 3); Miguel; Fewest votes (out of 4); Linda; Fewest votes (out of 5)	Iván; 42.76% (out of 2); Yuhui; Fewest votes (out of 3)	Felipe, Linda, Michelle, Miguel, Pedro, Waldo, Yuhui (out of 8)	Felipe, Linda, Michelle, Pedro, Waldo, Yuhui (out of 7)	Felipe, Michelle, Pedro, Waldo, Yuhui (out of 6)	Felipe, Michelle, Pedro, Waldo (out of 5)	Michelle, Pedro, Waldo (out of 4)	Michelle; 50.98% to win (out of 2)	

=== Notes ===
- ^1: As punishment for openly discussing their nominations, Daniela's & Miguel's votes during Week 1 were nulled.
- ^2: As co-HoH Carlyn openly expressed her intentions to save Manuel from Week 1's nominations, her & Pedro's HoH Save was nullified by Gran Hermano.
- ^3: Following the first eviction, the twin twist involving Valentina was revealed to the remaining housemates, thus ending their time on the show during Week 2.
- ^4: The Civilians had to collectively agree on one nominee for Week 2 following their win on that week's team task. The housemate they selected, Patricio, became ineligible to compete to save himself from that week's eviction and to be saved from the public vote by the Heads of Household.
- ^5: Due to breaking Gran Hermano's rules following multiple arguments with his fellow HouseGuests, Sebastián was automatically nominated for eviction during Week 3.
- ^6: Michelle's and Patricio's votes against Antonia during Week 3's nominations were annulled as they publicly stated their intentions of casting those votes.
- ^7: Once Íñigo became Head of Household in Week 4, Manuel's spontaneous nomination against him was automatically annulled.
- ^8: Because of rule-breaking and plotting nominations, certain votes cast by Alexandra, Michelle, and Patricio were annulled during Week 4's nominations process.
- ^9: Pedro's vote towards Camila P. during Week 4's nominations was annulled as he expressed his votes to her following his decision-making process in the Diary Room.
- ^10: Yuhui answered the Red Phone on Week 4 and, due to that, he put Diego up for eviction that week.
- ^11: As a new housemate, Angélica has been granted immunity for 2 weeks. She will nominate with the rest of the house, but cannot be nominated during this period of time.
- ^12: Following a mini task, Camila P. obtained immunity for Week 5's nominations.
- ^13: Alexandra's spontaneous nominations made on Week 5 were annulled as she broke the rules by revealing that she used this power before that week's nomination ceremony.
- ^14: After answering the Red Phone, Alexandra was asked to save one of the Week 5 nominees, and she chose Camila A., thus saving her from facing eviction that week.
- ^15: Alexandra was automatically nominated by Gran Hermano in Week 6 after an argument between her and production. She was ineligible to be saved from facing eviction by the Head of Household that week.
- ^16: Due to rule-breaking, the votes cast by Miguel and Patricio against Camila P. were nullified in Week 6.
- ^17: Due to rule-breaking, Patricio's vote towards Íñigo during Week 7's nominations was annulled.
- ^18: As she cast her spontaneous nominations before a special task, Camila P.'s points against Patricio on Week 7 were annulled, as Patricio obtained immunity by winning that special task.
- ^19: Due to a sanction imposed by Gran Hermano following an altercation, Alexandra, Angélica, and Manuel were automatically nominated on Week 8. They were eligible to save themselves from facing the final public vote, as they remained eligible to compete in the weekly immunity competition, but they cannot be saved by that week's Head of Household.
- ^20: After answering the Red Phone, Manuel was asked to save one of the Week 8 nominees, and he chose himself, thus saving him from facing eviction that week.
- ^21: Due to Angélica quitting the game on Day 60, the same night the Week 8 eviction show was planned, that week's eviction was annulled, and the corresponding percentages of all nominees were then revealed. She was later declared the season's 8th evicted houseguest during the Week 8 eviction show.
- ^22: During Week 8's eviction vote, the percentage split of the surviving nominees was not made public. Only Angélica's results were announced.
- ^23: Due to rule-breaking, Manuel was automatically nominated by Gran Hermano on Week 9. He was eligible to be saved from facing eviction by the Head of Household that week.
- ^24: Following the original repechage vote that happened during the first half of the week, a second (now digital only) round of voting was opened following the live nominations episode during Week 9.
- ^25: Several of the previous eligible housemates for the repechage were put up for a house vote on Day 67. The winner, Iván, will return to the house by the end of Week 10.
- ^26: After returning to the game, and breaking the rules of revealing information from the outside world, Carlyn was automatically nominated during Week 11. She was eligible to be saved from facing eviction by the Head of Household that week.
- ^27: Carlyn's vote against Alexandra during the Week 11 nominations was nulled following her multiple iterations where she stated that she was after Alexandra and was set to vote for her.
- ^28: Constanza entered the game on Day 80 and as a special guest, any votes cast against her during Week 12 were automatically invalid.
- ^29: Carlyn's fulminante against Manuel was annulled as he quit the game during Week 12.
- ^30: Michelle's spontaneous nominations against Manuel & Constana were annulled as he quit the game and she was a special guest during Week 12.
- ^31: Due to rule-breaking, Felipe's vote towards Michelle during Week 12's nominations was annulled.
- ^32: Carlyn answered the Red Phone on Week 13 and, due to that, she put Yuhui up for eviction that week.
- ^33: Due to rule-breaking, Miguel's vote towards Iván during Week 13's nominations was annulled.
- ^34: Starting Week 14, and with the finale approaching, negative nominations were over for the season and all housemates were automatically put up for eviction until the finale. This week had 3 evictions taking place on Day 97, Day 98 and Day 101, respectively.
