= ¿Ganar o servir? De vuelta al pasado =

AChilean reality TV series

- Genre: Reality competition
- Starring: Karla Constant; Sergio Lagos
- Country of origin: Chile
- Original language: Spanish
- No. of seasons: 1

Production
- Production locations: Lima, Peru
- Running time: 90 minutes
- Production companies: Cooking Media; Latina Televisión

Original release
- Network: Canal 13; 13Go; Latina Play (only Peru)
- Release: April 21, 2024 – 2024

Related
- La Granja VIP

¿Ganar o servir?, with its motto De vuelta al pasado, is a Chilean reality show.

== Format and rules ==
16 famous and unknown participants (eight men and eight women) initially entered the production, being isolated in a venue in Mamacona, located south of Lima. The premise of the contest is that the participants must adapt to the lifestyle of 200 years ago, therefore, they do not have electricity, hot water, nor any technological convenience. Thus, they are divided into two groups, where some will be the servants of the others, called lords. Participants from the two existing groups compete each week in various physical tests to determine which group will serve the other, and to determine which participant will be eliminated from the competition.

The different rules of the program are as follows:

- Team competition: Participants are divided into teams at the beginning of the program. These teams compete in various tests and challenges throughout the show. At the end of each competition, the winning team has the privilege of inhabiting the comfort-filled sector of the house, while the losing team must use the wing with the least privileges and, in addition, be servants to the winners. (week 1 - present)
- Individual competition: In this stage all participants, whether men or women, compete again, regardless of whether they belong to the winning or losing team. The participant who performs worst in this test is automatically nominated for the process on the way to the elimination duel. (week 1 - present)
- Circle of Fire: From week 2, two participants, one per team, must fight a duel where the winner will grant the team captain the power to grant immunity to one of its members, while the loser will give the obligation to the team captain to nominate one of his own. (week 2 - 3)
- The Gathering: During the head-to-head showdown stage, two elimination councils were held each week: one in which the losing team of the team competitions votes for a member of their own team in the "Assembly of Servants" and another in which the winning team votes for a participant from the same team in the "Assembly of Lords". (week 1)
  - From week 2, a single "Grand Assembly" is held where any participant, regardless of whether they belong to the winning or losing team, can vote for another member of the running of the bulls to be nominated. (week 2- presente)
- Duel to the Death: choose a participant to fight a duel to the death, where the loser was automatically eliminated. (week 3)
- Elimination Duel: The elimination test is a final competition between the four nominees. Prior to the test, each participant chooses a "salvation card", where two of the four nominees will be saved. Subsequently, it is carried out in an area specially prepared for this purpose. The participant who wins this test continues in the competition, while the loser must leave the program. (week 1 - present)

== Contestants ==
Name	Notability/Original seasons	Episode entered	Episode exited	Status	Duels eliminations	Ref.
Pangal Andrade	Año 0	1	136	Winner	2	
Francisco Rodríguez, Pancho	Calle 7	102	136	Runner-up	4	
Faloon Larraguibel	Yingo	1	135	Semifinalist	3	
Oriana Marzoli	Amor a prueba	1	135	Semifinalist	1	
Luis Mateucci	¿Volverías con tu ex?	1	135	20th eliminated	2	
Raimundo Cerda	Gran Hermano	12	134	19th eliminated	2	
Daniela Colett	Eduardo Vargas' ex-wife	12	133	18th eliminated	2	
Botota Fox	The Switch Drag Race	122	132	17th eliminated	2	
Botota Fox	The Switch Drag Race	1	122	14th eliminated	1	
Galadriel Caldirola, Gala	¿Volverías con tu ex?	1	129	16th eliminated	2	
Facundo González	Soñando por Bailar 2012	46	128	15th eliminated	2	
Francisca Maira	Gran Hermano	1	122	Abandoned	0	
Javiera Belen Silva	TV Personality	102	115	13th eliminated	1	
Sofía Camará	The Switch Drag Race	33	109	12th eliminated	1	
Austin Palao	Combate	3	101	11th eliminated	3	
Pamela Díaz	La granja VIP	81	100	Impostor	~~1~~	
María Almazábar, Blue Mary	Dahs González's ex-girlfriend	55	91	10th eliminated	1	
María Almazábar, Blue Mary	Dahs González's ex-girlfriend	1	42	6th eliminated	1	
Julia Fernandes	Amor a prueba	49	78	9th eliminated	1	
Nicolás Solabarrieta	Tierra Brava	69	78	Impostor	~~1~~	
Valentina Torres, Guaren	Tierra Brava	69	78	Impostor	~~1~~	
Camila Recabarren	Amor a prueba	1	66	8th eliminated	2	
Mariela Sotomayor	Entertainment Journalist	1	54	7th eliminated	1	
Fabio Agostini	Calle 7 Ecuador	35	42	Abandoned	1	
Christian Mujica	Jonathan Mujica's brother	22	37	5th eliminated	1	
Claudio Valdivia	Año 0	1	36	Abandoned	1	
José Ángel González, Poeta	Football Commentator	1	32	4th eliminated	1	
Gabriel Mendoza, Coca	La granja VIP	1	21	3rd eliminated	1	
Gonzalo Edgas	La Granja	1	12	Impostor	0	
Cindy Nahuelcoy	Former FIFA referee	1	10	2nd eliminated	1	
Alejandro Pérez	La isla de las tentaciones	1	1	1st eliminated	0	

- Returnees to Palabra de Honor: Oriana Marzoli, Falonn Larragibel, Gala Caldirola, Fabio Agostini, Facundo González, Raimundo Cerda. (6)

== Resume ==
Week	Immune	Nominateds	Salved	Duelists	Eliminated	Tipe of elimination
1	Coca				Alejandro	Sole Vote of Coca
1		Blue Mary, Cindy, Poeta, Claudio	Blue Mary, Poeta	Cindy vs. Claudio	Cindy	Duel
2	Daniela, Pangal, Francisca	Botota, Raimundo, Coca, Mariela	Botota, Mariela	Raimundo vs.Coca	Coca	Duel
3	Camila, Claudio, Blue Mary	Austin, Poeta, Mariela, Pangal	Pangal, Mariela	Austin vs. Poeta	Poeta	Duel
4				Fabio vs. Christian	Christian	Duel to the death
4	Daniela, Pangal	Blue Mary, Botota, Camila	Botota	Blue Mary vs.Camila	Blue Mary	Duel
5	Camila, Pangal, Oriana	Gala, Mariela, Facundo, Botota	Botota, Facundo	Gala vs. Mariela	Mariela	Duel
6	Oriana, Gala, Austin	Blue Mary, Luis, Botota, Camila	Blue Mary, Botota	Luis vs.Camila	Camila	Duel
7	Faloon, Pangal, Sofia	~~Nicolas~~, Austin, ~~Valentina~~, Julia		Julia vs.Austin	Julia	Duel
8	Oriana, Luis, Francisca	Blue Mary, ~~Pamela~~, Daniela, Facundo	Facundo	Daniela vs.Blue Mary	Blue Mary	Duel
9	Francisca, Gala, Sofia	Austin, Pangal, Daniela, Raimundo	Daniela, Raimundo	Austin vs.Pangal	Austin	Duel
10	Facundo, Gala, Daniela	Oriana, Sofia, Pancho, Botota	Oriana, Botota	Sofia vs.Pancho	Sofia	Duel
11	Francisca, Pancho, Luis	Javiera, Faloon, Facundo, Daniela	Faloon, Daniela	Javiera vs.Facundo	Javiera	Duel
12	Gala, Pancho, Facundo	Oriana, Botota, Faloon, Francisca	Oriana, Francisca	Botota vs.Faloon	Botota	Duel
13	Oriana			Facundo vs. Pancho	Facundo	Duel
13	Oriana	Gala, Botota, Pangal,	Pangal	Gala vs.Botota	Gala	Duel
14	Oriana, Pangal			Pancho vs. Botota	Botota	Duel
14	Oriana, Pangal, Pancho			Faloon vs. Daniela	Daniela	Duel
14	Oriana, Pangal, Pancho, Faloon			Raimundo vs. Luis	Raimundo	Duel
SF			Oriana, Pangal, Pancho, Faloon		Luis	Vote of Public
SF				Oriana vs. Pancho	Oriana	Duel
SF				Faloon vs. Pangal	Faloon	Duel
F				Oriana vs. Raimundo		Duel
F				Pancho vs. Pangal		Duel
