= Isabel Rábago =

Spanish journalist

- Born: María Isabel Rábago Ríos; 27 September 1974 (age 51); Ferrol, A Coruña, Spain
- Occupations: Journalist; TV panelist

María Isabel Rábago Ríos (born 2 April 1974) is a Spanish gossip-magazine journalist and TV panelist, who also worked as Head of Media Communications for the Partido Popular in the Community of Madrid.

== Biography ==
She was from a Cantabrian family; she was born by accident in Ferrol and grew up from a very young age in El Astillero. In 1993, she was crowned Miss Cantabria, an honor she held that year in the Miss Spain contest. She began her journalistic career at the Korpa Agency, but soon after began to collaborate and present several heart and current affairs programs in various media outlets, including: TVE, Telemadrid, Telecinco or Antena 3. She has also worked for print media such as ¡Qué me dices! or El Mundo. Apart from her professional face in the media, she has also worked as a writer. She is the author of two books: "Las ltimas cortesanas" and "La Pantoja, Julián & CIA: asalto a Marbella".

In 2015, she participated in Supervivientes, being the third expelled after 28 days on the island. Since then, she has worked in various Mediaset España programs such as Ya es mediodía, Viva la vida or La casa fuerte.

In 2018, she joined politics as head of communication and media in the Partido Popular of Madrid, forming part of the Deputy Secretary of Communication led by Isabel Díaz Ayuso and being in charge of carrying out the relationship with the media. In the position, she remained until October 2019. In September 2021, she signed on as a contestant on Secret Story: La casa de los secretos.

== Television career ==
Year	Title	Channel	Role
2007–2008	A 3 bandas	Antena 3	Collaborator
2009–2010	Tal cual lo contamos	Antena 3	Collaborator and presenter
2010–2011	Enemigos íntimos	Telecinco	Collaborator
2011–2013	Materia reservada	Telecinco	Collaborator
2012–2015	El programa de Ana Rosa	Telecinco	Collaborator
2012	Vuélveme loca	Telecinco	Collaborator
2013–2014	Abre los ojos y mira	Telecinco	Collaborator
2014	Sálvame Deluxe	Telecinco	Collaborator
2014	T con T	La 1	Collaborator
2014–2015	Espejo público	Antena 3	Collaborator
2015	Supervivientes	Telecinco	Contestant (3rd expelled)
2015	Pasaporte a la isla	Telecinco	Jury
2015–2017	¡Qué tiempo tan feliz!	Telecinco	Collaborator
2016–2019	La mañana	La 1	Collaborator
2016	Supervivientes: Conexión Honduras	Telecinco	Collaborator
2017 – present	Viva la vida	Telecinco	Collaborator
2018	Buenos días, Madrid	Telemadrid	Collaborator
2018 – present	Ya es mediodía	Telecinco	Collaborator
2020	La casa fuerte	Telecinco	Collaborator
2021	Rocío, contar la verdad para seguir viva	Telecinco	Collaborator
2021	Secret Story: La Casa de los Secretos	Telecinco	Contestant (10th expelled)
2021 – present	Ya son las ocho	Telecinco	Collaborator
2022	Montealto: Regreso a la casa	Telecinco	Collaborator
2022	Sálvame	Telecinco	Collaborator

== Published books ==
- Rábago, Isabel (2006). La Pantoja, Julián & Cía: asalto a Marbella. Espejo de Tinta. p. 190. ISBN 8496280748.
- Rábago, Isabel (2007). Las últimas cortesanas. Espejo de Tinta. p. 352. ISBN 8496892123.
