= Sandra Pica =

Spanish television personality

- Born: Sandra González Pica; 16 August 1998 (age 28); Barcelona, Spain
- Occupation: Television personality
- Years active: 2017–present

Sandra González Pica (born August 16, 1998) is a Spanish media personality, fashion designer, and television collaborator who rose to fame after participating in Mujeres y hombres y viceversa. She returned to television as a bachelorette on the reality show La Isla de las Tentaciones 2 and has since participated as a collaborator on several programs.

== Biography ==
=== First years ===
She was born in Barcelona, where she grew up with her parents, Sonia Pica and Pedro González, and her sister Genissa González; as a child, she struggled with bulimia and was bullied by her classmates. Sandra Pica went to the University of Barcelona and studied fashion design while also appearing on TV.

=== Professional career ===
Her first appearance on television was in 2017 on the dating show Mujeres y hombres y viceversa as a suitor of the tronista Joni Marley. He chose Sandra as his favorite, and they left the program together. They would later return to report their breakup the same year.

After several years away from the television spotlight, she appeared as a single woman in the second season of the reality show La Isla de las tentaciones in 2020, where she fell in love with contestant Tom Brusse, with whom she would maintain a relationship after leaving the show separately.

Along with several occasional appearances in tabloid programs such as Sálvame or Deluxe, Sandra became a contestant in the second edition of La casa fuerte with her partner Tom Brusse, in which they finished in fifth position.

Some time later, Tom would become a participant in Supervivientes in 2021, while Sandra would defend him on set along with other collaborators.

After several weeks, Sandra traveled to Honduras, the country where Supervivientes, was being filmed, to break off her relationship with Tom. Once she to Spain, she continued collaborating on Telecinco programs while the news spread that she was in a relationship with Julen de la Guerra.

In September 2021, Sandra participated in Mediaset España's new reality show Secret Story: La Casa de los Secretos, where she became the last expelled person of the edition, with a stay of 98 days. Sandra won the mechanics and €50,000 in the semi–finals thanks to the sphere number 02.

== Filmography ==
Public appearances
Year	Title	Channel	Role
2017	Mujeres y Hombres y Viceversa	Telecinco	Applicant
2018	Mujeres y Hombres y Viceversa	Telecinco	Contributor
2020	La isla de las tentaciones 2	Telecinco and Cuatro	Single
2020	Mujeres y Hombres y Viceversa	Cuatro	Contributor
2020	La Casa Fuerte 2	Telecinco	Contestant – 7th expelled
2021	Supervivientes	Telecinco	Collaborator / advocate
2021	Pijama Party	Mtmad	Participant
2021	Secret Story: La casa de los secretos	Telecinco	Contestant – 14th evicted / Sphere Winner
2022	Contracorriente	Mtmad	Protagonist
