= Agustín Bravo =

Spanish radio and television presenter

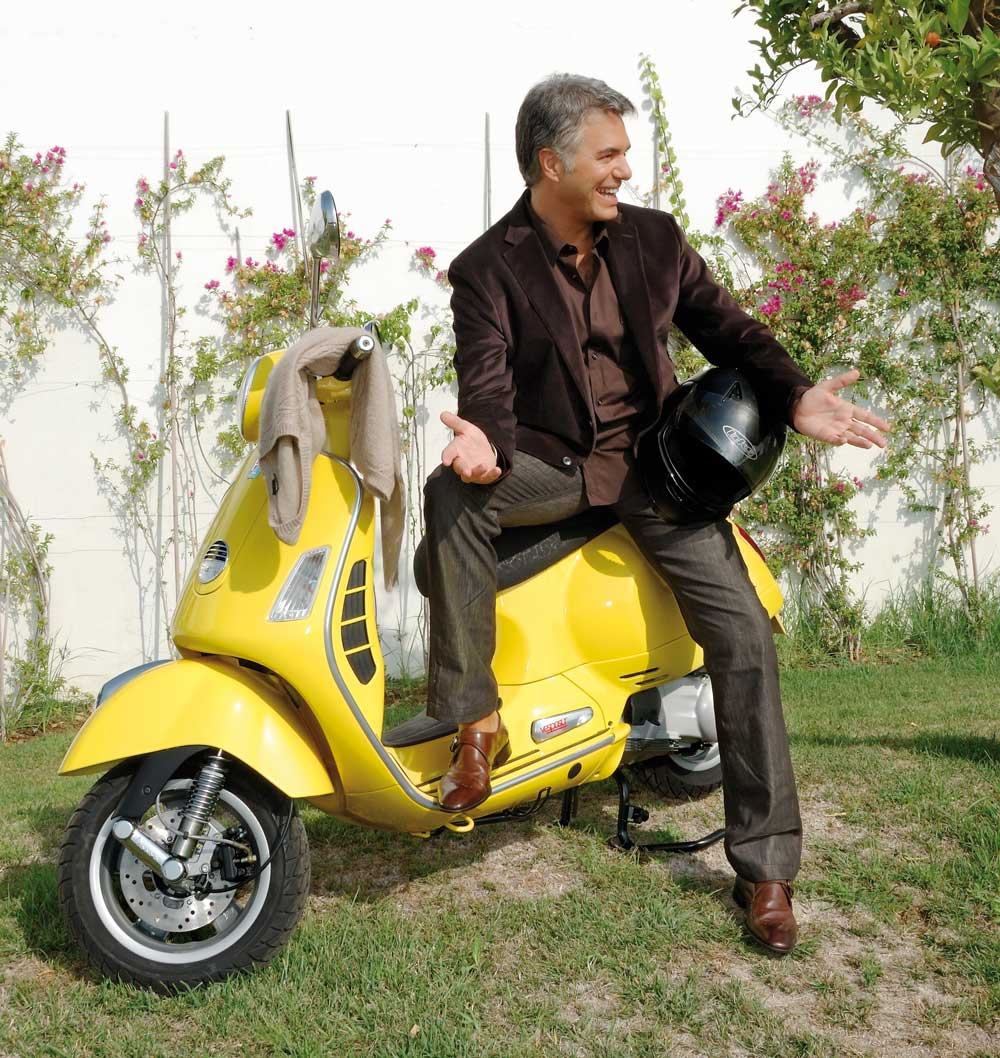
- Born: Agustín Bravo Abreu; 7 March 1961 (age 65); Almaraz, Cáceres, Spain
- Occupations: Radio and television presenter
- Employers: Cadena COPE; Canal Sur; Telemadrid

Agustín Bravo Abreu (born March 7, 1961, in Almaraz, Cáceres) is a Spanish radio and television presenter.

== Biography ==
Bravo began his career in radio before transitioning to television in 1989, appearing on the morning program Por la mañana on Televisión Española under the guidance of Jesús Hermida.

After the conclusion of the show, he joined Telemadrid, where he hosted the leisure program Zip Zap. La Guía and the musical show Verano 90 alongside Mariló Montero.

In 1991, he moved to Telecinco where he hosted Telecupón for five years, initially with Belén Rueda and later with Carmen Sevilla, as well as presenting the magazine shows Se acabó la siesta and Date un respiro, along with numerous live galas and contests.

After hosting various shows on Antena 3, including La noche de los magníficos and El rastrillo with Paula Vázquez, as well as a telethon, he began working at Canal Sur Televisión, becoming one of its star presenters. There he hosted Números rojos, Paga extra, the magazine show Bravo por la tarde (2000–2003), and later the contests El Padrino and Hacemos el humor.

In 2001, he received the Antena de Oro award for best presenter for his work on Bravo por la tarde.

In 2004, he returned to Antena 3 to host the afternoon magazine show A la carta.

In 2006, he took over the afternoons on the newly launched Canal Extremadura with a program very similar to Bravo por la tarde. He also hosted Suite Reservada, an interview program aired on Popular TV on Saturdays at 21:00.

Since May 5, 2008, he has been hosting the new afternoon magazine show A buenas horas on Televisión Castilla y León, produced by Santo y Seña Producciones, a program very similar to Bravo por la tarde.

Starting June 28, 2010, he began hosting the late-night show Bravo Verano for the municipal channel Giralda Televisión in Seville, airing Monday to Friday from 22:00 to 23:30.

On February 14, 2011, he returned to Giralda TV to host the morning magazine show Bravo a la 1.

Since October 2011, he has been hosting the show Andalucía a debate on Metropolitan Andalucía from Monday to Friday from 20:30 to 22:00. Additionally, he contributes to the program Así son las mañanas de Cope Sevilla on Cadena COPE on Fridays from 12:20 to 13:30.

On November 26 and 27, 2011, he co-hosted the selection galas for Miss y Míster España with María José Suárez.

In January 2012, it was announced that he would host the Official Carnival Group Contest (COAC) on Onda Cádiz TV and even appeared as a participant in the chirigota "Los Hinchapelotas".

Since 2012, he has been teaching television presenter workshops organized by the Faculty of Communication of Seville.

In April 2013, he joined Intereconomía Corporation to host the midday slot on the network with the program Bravo y su gente.

He currently sporadically collaborates on various television and radio programs in Spain but does not regularly host any program (2015–2018).

In February 2015, he began creating an online television channel called "YouTV" (https://youtv.es), partnering with a friend's company, where he recorded several street interview programs.

In 2018, 2019, and 2020, he filled in for Carlos Herrera during the summer mornings on parts of the schedule for Cadena COPE.

In April 2021, he joined the lineup of contestants on the program Supervivientes 2021, being expelled in the fourth week of the reality show and in his second nomination.

On June 14, 2021, he began a new phase at TeleMadrid, hosting the program "Está Pasando", replacing Inés Ballester. He was joined by meteorologist Tania Garralda. The program ended on August 6, 2021.

== Career ==
=== Radio ===
- Top 40 Radio España (1988/1989). Announcer
- Radio Hora Radio España (1989/1990). Announcer
- Así son las mañanas de Cope Sevilla (2011/2014), on Cadena Cope. Collaborator
- La mañana COPE, for Sevilla (2015–2021), on Cadena Cope. Announcer
- Herrera en Cope, Substitute for Carlos Herrera during the summer from 10 to 12 am. (2018–present). Announcer
- El Tablero, radio game show for Cope Andalucía (2019/2020). Announcer
- Más de Uno Madrid Sur, local broadcast of Onda Cero Madrid Sur (2021/2022). Announcer

=== Television (as a presenter) ===
- Por la mañana (1988–1989) on Televisión Española, as an editor
- Zip Zap. La Guía (1989–1990), on Telemadrid.
- Verano 90 (1990), on Telemadrid.
- Telecupón (1991–1995), on Telecinco.
- Se acabó la siesta (1992), on Telecinco.
- Date un respiro (1993), on Telecinco.
- Bellezas al agua (1993), on Telecinco.
- ¿Se puede? (1993–1994), on Telecinco.
- El rastrillo (1995) on Antena 3.
- La noche de los magníficos (1996) on Antena 3.
- Telemaratón 97 (1997) on Antena 3.
- Un menú de 7 estrellas (1998) on Antena 3.
- Cosas de familia (1998) on Canal 9.
- El precio justo (1999) on Canal 7 TV Madrid.
- Números rojos (1999–2000), on Canal Sur.
- Paga extra (1999) on Canal Sur.
- Bravo por la tarde (2000–2003), on Canal Sur.
- El Padrino (2003–2004), on Canal Sur.
- Háblame de ti (2004), on Antena 3.
- A la carta (2004), on Antena 3.
- Bravo por Extremadura (2006), on Canal Extremadura.
- Vaya vecinos (2007) Canal Sur.
- A buenas horas (2008 - 2009), on La 7, (current shareholder of Radio Televisión de Castilla y León).
- Bravo Verano (2010), on Giralda Televisión.
- ¿QSM? (2011), on Metropolitan TV.
- Bravo a la 1 (2011), on Giralda Televisión.
- Andalucía a debate (2012), on Metropolitan TV.
- COAC 2012 (2012), on Onda Cádiz TV and Metropolitan TV.
- Bravo y su gente (2013–2015), on Intereconomía TV. Presenter
- Ven a cenar conmigo: Gourmet edition, in its Summer version (2018), on Cuatro, as a contestant
- No estás sola (2019) on Canal Sur TV. Presenter
- Supervivientes (2021) on Telecinco and Cuatro. Contestant (4th evicted)
- Está pasando (2021), on Telemadrid.
- Amar es para siempre (2023) on Antena 3. Special collaboration as Rodolfo Ballester in 3 episodes.
