= Gran Hermano (Chilean TV series) season 1 =

Gran Hermano
- Season 1
- Presented by: Diana Bolocco; Julio Rodríguez

Release
- Original network: Chilevision
- Original release: 18 June – 3 December 2023

Season chronology
- Next → Season 2

Gran Hermano Chile is the first season of Big Brother in Chile.

== Background ==
After the success of the rebooted 10th season of the Argentine version, Chilevisión announced on February 23, 2023, that applications for the first season of the show were open. Applications were open to those between 18 and 101 years of age. The house used for this series is the same one currently being used for Gran Hermano in Argentina.

This marks the first time since Gran Hermano del Pacífico in 2005 that a season of Gran Hermano was aired in Chile.

The program consists of that for a time of approximately four months, a group of participants will try to avoid the "nominations" made by themselves and overcome the eliminations that, periodically, the audience decides and thus get the final prize. The prize for the winner is CL$30,000,000.

== Housemates ==
Name	Age	Occupation	Residence	Day entered	Day exited	Status
Constanza Capelli	27	Model and professional dancer	Providencia	1	168	Winner
Scarlette Gálvez	21	Influencer, model and dancer	Maipú	75	168	Runner-up
Jennifer Galvarini	48	Nursing technician and influencer	Ancud	1	168	Third place
Viviana Acevedo	22	Physical education teacher and soccer player	Arica	115	165	Evicted
Viviana Acevedo	22	Physical education teacher and soccer player	Arica	1	51	Evicted
Jorge Aldoney	27	Commercial engineer, model, and event host	Providencia	1	164	Evicted
Skarleth Skar Labra	18	Business, dancer, and influencer	Punta Arenas	116	162	Evicted
Skarleth Skar Labra	18	Business, dancer, and influencer	Punta Arenas	102	108	Walked
Skarleth Skar Labra	18	Business, dancer, and influencer	Punta Arenas	1	71	Evicted
Francisco Arenas	61	Mechanic and truck driver	Maipú	99	155	Evicted
Francisco Arenas	61	Mechanic and truck driver	Maipú	1	43	Evicted
Hans Valdés	18	Soccer player	Constitución	1	148	Evicted
Sebastián Ramírez	36	Physical trainer, event producer and DJ	Melipilla	102	143	Walked
Sebastián Ramírez	36	Physical trainer, event producer and DJ	Melipilla	26	49	Walked
Fernando Altamirano	25	Technical director	Cabrero	124	141	Evicted
Fernando Altamirano	25	Technical director	Cabrero	1	36	Evicted
Raimundo Cerda	24	Agricultural engineer	Lo Barnechea	115	134	Evicted
Raimundo Cerda	24	Agricultural engineer	Lo Barnechea	44	107	Evicted
Alessia Traverso	21	Student, singer and influencer	Concón	102	127	Evicted
Alessia Traverso	21	Student, singer and influencer	Concón	1	94	Evicted
Catalina Salazar	29	Gymnast, gamer, and influencer	Loncoche	96	124	Walked
Lucas Crespo	23	Student, jiujitsu instructor, and influencer	Lo Barnechea	115	120	Evicted
Lucas Crespo	23	Student, jiujitsu instructor, and influencer	Lo Barnechea	1	64	Evicted
Estefanía Galeota	26	Psychology student	Providencia	102	113	Evicted
Estefanía Galeota	26	Psychology student	Providencia	1	22	Evicted
Francisca Maira	23	Model, influencer, and content creator	Las Condes	102	110	Walked
Francisca Maira	23	Model, influencer, and content creator	Las Condes	1	78	Evicted
Ignacia Michelson	30	Influencer and model	Las Condes	75	108	Walked
(Argentina) Federico Farrel	37	Singer, model, and YouTuber	Buenos Aires, Argentina	75	104	Walked
Mónica Ramos	77	Pensioner and trader	La Florida	1	85	Evicted
Rubén Gutiérrez	26	Security guard	Yungay	1	85	Ejected
Trinidad Cerda	35	Actress and flight attendant	Las Condes	1	57	Evicted
Maite Phillips	22	Student	Vitacura	1	29	Evicted
Ariel Wuth	29	Actor and street artist	Santiago	1	15	Evicted
Benjamín Lagos	21	Athlete and content creator	Puchuncaví	1	8	Evicted

Post Big Brother
Contestant	Reality	Place
Trinidad Cerda	Top Chef VIP Chile 1 Fiebre de Baile 7	16th place 25th place
Jennifer Galvarini	Top Chef VIP Chile 1 Gran Hermano Generación Dorada	7th place 7th place
Francisca Maira	¿Ganar o servir? De vuelta al pasado Fiebre de Baile 7	11th place 13th place
Raimundo Cerda	¿Ganar o servir? De vuelta al pasado Palabra de Honor; Fiebre de Baile 6 ¿Volverías con tu ex? 2	6th place 2nd place 10th place TBA
Constanza Capelli	Top Chef VIP Chile 2 Fiebre de Baile 6 Fiebre de Baile 7	4th place 8th place 3rd place
Scarlette Gálvez	Top Chef VIP Chile 2 Mundos opuestos 3 Primer Tiempo	2nd place 18th place
Sebastián Ramírez	Gran Hermano season 2	20th place
Ignacia Michelson	Mundos opuestos 3 Primer Tiempo; Mundos opuestos 3 Segundo Tiempo; Fiebre de Baile 7	12th place 18th place 15th place
Skarleth Labra	Fiebre de Baile 6	Winner
Estefania Galeota	¿Volverías con tu ex? 2	TBA
Alessia Traverso	Fiebre de canto	TBA

== Nominations table ==
	Week 1	Week 2	Week 3	Week 4	Week 5	Week 6	Week 7	Week 8	Week 9	Week 10	Week 11	Week 12	Week 13	Week 14	Week 15	Week 16	Week 17			Week 18	Week 19	Week 20	Week 21	Week 22	Week 23	Week 24 Finale		Nomination points received
Head(s) of Household	Ariel	Jorge	Viviana	Francisco	Rubén; Skarleth	Viviana	Alessia	Alessia	Hans	Raimundo	Hans	Alessia	Federico	Ignacia	Catalina	Sebastián			Jorge; Scarlette; Sebastián	Scarlette	Viviana	Sebastián	Constanza	Jorge	Scarlette			Nomination points received
Constanza	Estefanía; Lucas	Ariel; Lucas	Estefanía; Fernando	Francisca; Maite	Fernando; Alessia	Skarleth; Alessia	Trinidad; Skarleth	Trinidad; Jorge	Lucas; Jorge	~~Skarleth~~; Alessia	Mónica; Jorge	Jorge; Mónica	~~Jorge~~	Francisco; Viviana	Raimundo; Francisca	Estefanía; Francisca	Viviana; Raimundo	Lucas	Lucas; Hans	Alessia; Sebastián	(4)Hans (2)Francisco	Jorge; Francisco	Hans; Jorge	No Nominations	No Nominations	Winner (Day 168)		96
Scarlette	Not in House										Exempt		Jorge; Alessia	Francisco; Estefanía	Francisca; Raimundo	Estefanía; Francisco	Lucas; Ariel	Lucas	Jennifer; Francisco	Alessia; Raimundo	Raimundo	Francisco; Jennifer	Jennifer; Hans	No Nominations	No Nominations	Runner-up (Day 168)		39
Jennifer	Maite; Fernando	Viviana; Alessia	Maite; Rubén	Rubén; Lucas	Fernando; ~~Skarleth~~	Skarleth; Alessia	Viviana; Skarleth	Trinidad; Jorge	Lucas; Jorge	Skarleth	Alessia; Mónica	Mónica; Jorge	~~Alessia~~; Hans	Francisco; Estefanía	Raimundo; Francisca	Catalina; Francisca	Raimundo; Lucas	Raimundo	Viviana; Hans	Jorge; Sebastián	Fernando; Jorge	Scarlette; Viviana	~~Skarleth~~; Jorge	No Nominations	No Nominations	Third place (Day 168)		54
Viviana	Estefanía; Hans	Fernando; Jennifer	Trinidad; Jorge	Trinidad; Hans	Francisco; Constanza	Francisco; Constanza	Sebastián; Constanza	Evicted (Day 51)											Raimundo; Alessia	Sebastián; Alessia	Francisco; Hans	~~Sebastián~~	Hans; Skarleth	No Nominations	No Nominations	Re-Evicted (Day 165)		34
Jorge	Mónica; Francisco	~~Mónica~~; Skarleth	Estefanía; Mónica	Maite; Alessia	Hans; Alessia	Constanza; Francisco	Sebastián; Mónica	Mónica; Constanza	Mónica; Lucas	Jennifer; Hans	Raimundo; Constanza	Mónica; Constanza	Scarlette; Constanza	Alessia; Skarleth	Scarlette; Estefanía	Estefanía; Francisco	Lucas; Viviana	Lucas	Francisco; Raimundo	Sebastián; Francisco	Francisco; Scarlette	Francisco; Scarlette	Scarlette; Viviana	No Nominations	No Nominations	Evicted (Day 164)		62
Skarleth	Lucas; Benjamín	Lucas; Fernando	Constanza; Rubén	Fernando; Constanza	Constanza; Lucas	Jennifer; Constanza	Constanza; Sebastián	Constanza; Jennifer	Lucas; Rubén	Constanza; Jorge	Evicted (Day 71)				Sebastián; Scarlette	Walked (Day 108)				Sebastián; Raimundo	Francisco; Fernando	Francisco; Fernando	Scarlette; Hans	No Nominations	No Nominations	Re-Evicted (Day 162)		19
Francisco	Francisca; Jorge	Francisca; Viviana	Fernando; Jorge	Maite; Francisca	Fernando; Alessia	Jorge; ~~Viviana~~	Evicted (Day 43)								Francisca; Raimundo	Alessia; Francisca	Mónica; Ariel	Raimundo	Viviana; Lucas	Viviana	Fernando; Scarlette	Fernando; Viviana	Jorge; Skarleth	No Nominations	Re-Evicted (Day 155)			57
Hans	Trinidad; Francisca	Viviana; Constanza	Constanza; Jorge	Viviana; Jorge	Alessia; Viviana	Francisca; Jennifer	Sebastián; Francisca	Francisca; Constanza	Lucas; Jorge	Jorge; Rubén	Francisca; Raimundo	Constanza; Raimundo	Ignacia; Scarlette	Estefanía; Skarleth	Scarlette; Ignacia	Francisca; Catalina	Lucas; Viviana	Lucas	Constanza; Raimundo	Sebastián; Catalina	Scarlette; Constanza	Viviana; Scarlette	Scarlette; Viviana	Evicted (Day 148)				38
Sebastián	Not in House				Exempt		Skarleth; Jorge	Walked (Day 49)							Scarlette; Skarleth	Catalina; Estefanía	Raimundo; Trinidad	Lucas	Lucas; Viviana	Hans; Jorge	Fernando; Scarlette	Fernando; Viviana	~~Skarleth~~	Walked (Day 143)				25
Fernando	Benjamín; Maite	~~Jennifer~~; Constanza	Trinidad; Constanza	Constanza; Trinidad	Constanza; Francisco	Evicted (Day 36)															Francisco; Skarleth	Francisco; Skarleth	Re-Evicted (Day 141)					34
Raimundo	Not in House						Exempt		Jorge; Lucas	Hans; Alessia	Jorge; ~~Hans~~	Mónica; Jorge	Hans; Jorge	Sebastián; Francisca	Scarlette; Francisco	Evicted (Day 107)			Constanza; Lucas	Constanza; Hans	Scarlette; Fernando	Re-Evicted (Day 134)						24
Alessia	Hans; Jorge	Jennifer; Trinidad	Constanza; Trinidad	Jennifer; Constanza	Constanza; Jennifer	Constanza; Jennifer	Jennifer; ~~Constanza~~	Jennifer; Constanza	Jorge; Lucas	Constanza; Hans	Raimundo; Jennifer	Mónica; Hans	Constanza; Scarlette	Evicted (Day 94)	Scarlette; Estefanía	Francisco; Estefanía	Raimundo; Lucas	Lucas	Francisco; Viviana	Constanza; Francisco	Re-Evicted (Day 127)							33
Catalina	Not in House														Francisca; Sebastián	Estefanía; Francisca	Raimundo; Lucas	Raimundo	Viviana; Lucas	Sebastián; Francisco	Walked (Day 124)							6
Lucas	Jennifer; Maite	Trinidad; Jennifer	Estefanía; Constanza	Trinidad; Constanza	Jennifer; Constanza	Francisco; Constanza	Walked (Day 46)	Constanza; Jennifer	Jennifer	Evicted (Day 64)									Francisco; Constanza	Re-Evicted (Day 120)								30
Estefanía	Viviana; Constanza	Trinidad; Ariel	Jorge; Mónica	Evicted (Day 22)											Ignacia; Raimundo	Scarlette	Re-Evicted (Day 113)											32
Francisca	Francisco; Hans	Trinidad; Hans	Constanza; Jorge	Constanza; Hans	Constanza; Francisco	Constanza; Hans	Constanza; Jorge	Jorge; Hans	Jorge; Rubén	Hans; Jorge	Jennifer; Rubén	Evicted (Day 78)			Ignacia; Scarlette	Estefanía; Francisco	Walked (Day 110)											47
Ignacia	Not in House										Exempt		Alessia; Jorge	(4)Sebastián (2)Alessia	Francisca; Scarlette	Walked (Day 108)												9
Federico	Not in House										Exempt		Raimundo; Alessia	Francisca; Francisco	Walked (Day 108)													0
Mónica	Rubén; Francisca	Lucas; Skarleth	Jorge; Estefanía	Maite; Skarleth	Francisca; Alessia	Constanza; Alessia	Sebastián; Constanza	Francisca; Jorge	Francisca; Jorge	Alessia; Francisca	Francisca; Alessia	Jennifer; Constanza	Evicted (Day 85)															29
Rubén	Fernando; Skarleth	Viviana; Jennifer	Estefanía; Jennifer	Mónica; Trinidad	Constanza; Francisco	Mónica; Francisco	Jennifer; Sebastián	Trinidad; Mónica	Raimundo; Constanza	Jennifer; Constanza	Constanza; Jennifer	Mónica; Constanza	Ejected (Day 85)															17
Trinidad	Estefanía; Francisca	Ariel; Viviana	Estefanía; Maite	Maite; Fernando	Constanza; Alessia	Constanza; Lucas	Constanza; ~~Sebastián~~	Constanza; Rubén	Evicted (Day 57)																			34
Maite	Francisca; Jennifer	Jennifer; Trinidad	Jorge; Trinidad	~~Constanza~~; Jennifer	Evicted (Day 29)																							17
Ariel	Benjamín; Jennifer	~~Constanza~~; Trinidad	Evicted (Day 15)																									5
Benjamín	Jennifer; Hans	Evicted (Day 8)																										5
Walked							Lucas; Sebastián								Federico	Skarleth; Ignacia; Francisca				Catalina			Sebastián					
Ejected												Rubén																
Re-Entered							Lucas							Alessia; Estefanía; Francisca; Francisco; Sebastián; Skarleth			Lucas; Raimundo; Skarleth; Viviana			Fernando								
Nomination Extra Points			Constanza	Rubén	Francisco	Jennifer	Viviana	Jennifer	Rubén	Rubén	Jennifer	Constanza	Ignacia			Francisco			~~Jorge~~	Francisco	Scarlette	Scarlette	~~Sebastián~~					
Nominated	Benjamín; Estefanía; Francisca; Hans; Jennifer	Ariel; Jennifer; Lucas; Trinidad; Viviana	Constanza; Estefanía; Francisco; Jorge; Trinidad	Constanza; Francisca; Maite; Rubén; Trinidad	Alessia; Constanza; Fernando; Francisco; Jennifer	Constanza; Francisco; Jennifer; Skarleth	Constanza; Jennifer; ~~Sebastián~~; Skarleth; Viviana	Constanza; Jennifer; Jorge; Trinidad	Francisca; Jennifer; Jorge; Lucas; Mónica; Raimundo; Rubén	Alessia; Constanza; Hans; Jennifer; Jorge; Skarleth	Francisca; Jennifer; Jorge; Raimundo	Constanza; Jennifer; Jorge; Mónica	Alessia; Hans; Ignacia; Jorge; Scarlette	Alessia; Ariel; Estefanía; Fernando; Francisca; Francisco; Lucas; Mónica; Sebastián; Skarleth; Trinidad; Viviana	Francisca; Ignacia; Raimundo; Scarlette	Catalina; Estefanía; ~~Francisca~~; Francisco; Scarlette	Ariel; Fernando; Lucas; Mónica; Raimundo; Trinidad; Viviana		Constanza; Francisco; Lucas; Viviana	Alessia; Constanza; Francisco; Sebastián; Viviana	Fernando; Francisco; Hans; Raimundo; Scarlette; Sebastian	Constanza; Fernando; ~~Francisco~~; Scarlette; Viviana	Hans; Jorge; Scarlette; Skarleth	Constanza; Francisco; Jennifer; Scarlette; Skarleth; Viviana	Constanza; Jennifer; Jorge; Skarleth; Viviana	Constanza; Jennifer; Jorge; Scarlette; Viviana		
Saved by HoH	Hans	Lucas	Constanza	Constanza		Skarleth	Skarleth	Jorge	Francisca	Jennifer	Jorge	Jorge	Ignacia		Ignacia	Francisco			Constanza	Constanza	Scarlette	Constanza	Scarlette	Skarleth	Viviana			
Saved	Francisca (Out 4); Estefanía (Out 3); Jennifer; 43,22% (Out 2)	Trinidad (Out 4); Viviana (Out 3); Jennifer; 44,61% (Out 2)	Trinidad (Out 4); Jorge (Out 3); Francisco; 49,18% (Out 2)	Rubén (Out 4); Trinidad (Out 3); Francisca; 9,96% (Out 2)	Francisco (Out 5); Jennifer (Out 4); Constanza (Out 3); Alessia; 19,89% (Out 2)	Jennifer (Out 3); Constanza; 28,10% (Out 2)	Constanza (Out 3); Jennifer; 6,69% (Out 2)	Constanza (Out 3); Jennifer; 6,00% (Out 2)	Raimundo (Out 6); Rubén (Out 5); Mónica (Out 4); Jorge (Out 3); Jennifer; 11,41% (Out 2)	Alessia (Out 5); Constanza (Out 4); Jorge (Out 3); Hans; 18,49% (Out 2)	Raimundo (Out 3); Jennifer; 11,60% (Out 2)	Jennifer (Out 3); Constanza; 45,62% (Out 2)	Hans (Out 4); Jorge (Out 3); Scarlette; 45,10% (Out 2)	Francisco; 7 votes Sebastián; 6 votes Alessia; 4 votes Estefanía; 4 votes Francisca; 3 votes Skarleth; 55,28%	Francisca (Out 3); Scarlette; 36,12% (Out 2)	Catalina (Out 3); Scarlette; 30,74% (Out 2)	Lucas; 6 votes Raimundo; 54,74% Viviana; 24,66%		Francisco (Out 3); Viviana; 21,94% (Out 2)	Francisco (Out 4); Sebastián (Out 3); Viviana; 43,27% (Out 2)	Hans (Out 5); Francisco (Out 4); Sebastián (Out 3); Fernando; 38,13% (Out 2)	Scarlette (Out 3); Viviana; 21,53% (Out 2)	Jorge (Out 3); Skarleth; 20,37% (Out 2)	Constanza; Jennifer; Scarlette; Viviana (Most votes to save)	Constanza; Jennifer; Jorge (Most votes to save)			
Evicted	Benjamín; 56.78% to evict	Ariel; 55.39% to evict	Estefanía; 50.82% to evict	Maite; 90.04% to evict	Fernando; 80.11% to evict	Francisco; 71.90% to evict	Viviana; 93.31% to evict	Trinidad; 94.00% to evict	Lucas; 88.59% to evict	Skarleth; 81.51% to evict	Francisca; 88.40% to evict	Mónica; 54.38% to evict	Alessia; 54.90% to evict	Viviana; 28.52% to save Fernando; 11.64% to save Trinidad; 2.40% to save Lucas; 2.14% to save Ariel; 0.02% to save Mónica; 0 votes to save	Raimundo; 63.88% to evict	Estefanía; 69.26% to evict	Fernando; 19.17% to save Mónica; 0.99% to save Trinidad; 0.26% to save Ariel; 0.18% to save		Lucas; 78.06% to evict	Alessia; 56.73% to evict	Raimundo; 61.87% to evict	Fernando; 78.47% to evict	Hans; 79.63% to evict	Francisco; 7.89% to save	Skarleth; 18,31% to save	Constanza; 43,99% to win		
Evicted	Benjamín; 56.78% to evict	Ariel; 55.39% to evict	Estefanía; 50.82% to evict	Maite; 90.04% to evict	Fernando; 80.11% to evict	Francisco; 71.90% to evict	Viviana; 93.31% to evict	Trinidad; 94.00% to evict	Lucas; 88.59% to evict	Skarleth; 81.51% to evict	Francisca; 88.40% to evict	Mónica; 54.38% to evict	Alessia; 54.90% to evict	Viviana; 28.52% to save Fernando; 11.64% to save Trinidad; 2.40% to save Lucas; 2.14% to save Ariel; 0.02% to save Mónica; 0 votes to save	Raimundo; 63.88% to evict	Estefanía; 69.26% to evict	Fernando; 19.17% to save Mónica; 0.99% to save Trinidad; 0.26% to save Ariel; 0.18% to save		Lucas; 78.06% to evict	Alessia; 56.73% to evict	Raimundo; 61.87% to evict	Fernando; 78.47% to evict	Hans; 79.63% to evict	Francisco; 7.89% to save	Skarleth; 18,31% to save	Scarlette; 30,61% to win	Jennifer; 25,40% to win	
Evicted	Benjamín; 56.78% to evict	Ariel; 55.39% to evict	Estefanía; 50.82% to evict	Maite; 90.04% to evict	Fernando; 80.11% to evict	Francisco; 71.90% to evict	Viviana; 93.31% to evict	Trinidad; 94.00% to evict	Lucas; 88.59% to evict	Skarleth; 81.51% to evict	Francisca; 88.40% to evict	Mónica; 54.38% to evict	Alessia; 54.90% to evict	Viviana; 28.52% to save Fernando; 11.64% to save Trinidad; 2.40% to save Lucas; 2.14% to save Ariel; 0.02% to save Mónica; 0 votes to save	Raimundo; 63.88% to evict	Estefanía; 69.26% to evict	Fernando; 19.17% to save Mónica; 0.99% to save Trinidad; 0.26% to save Ariel; 0.18% to save		Lucas; 78.06% to evict	Alessia; 56.73% to evict	Raimundo; 61.87% to evict	Fernando; 78.47% to evict	Hans; 79.63% to evict	Francisco; 7.89% to save	Skarleth; 18,31% to save	Viviana; 17,38% to save	Jorge; 12,41% to save	

== Game history ==
	Nomination																									
	1	2	3	4	5	6	7	8	9	10	11	12	13	14	15	16	17	18	19	20	21	22	23	Final		
Constanza	Saved	Saved	Pre-Save	Pre-Save	Nominee	Nominee	Nominee	Nominee	Saved	Nominee	Saved	Nominee	Saved	Immune			Pre-Save	Saved	Saved	Pre-Save	HOH	Nominee				Winner
Scarlette	Not in House										Entered	Immune	Nominee	Immune	Nominee	Nominee	HOH	HOH	Pre-Save	Nominee	Pre-Save	Nominee	HOH	Nominee		Runner-up
Jennifer	Nominee	Nominee	Saved	Saved	Nominee	Nominee	Nominee	Nominee	Nominee	Pre-Save	Nominee	Nominee	Saved	Immune			Saved	Saved	Saved	Saved	Saved	Nominee				Third
Viviana	Saved	Nominee	HOH	Saved	Saved	HOH	Evicted										Nominee	Nominee	HOH	Nominee	Saved	Nominee	Pre-Save	Nominee	Evicted	
Jorge	Saved	HOH	Nominee	Saved	Saved	Saved	Saved	Pre-Save	Nominee	Nominee	Pre-Save	Pre-Save	Nominee	Immune			HOH	Saved	Saved	Saved	Nominee	HOH	Nominee	Evicted		
Skarleth	Saved	Saved	Saved	Saved	HOH	Pre-Save	Pre-Save	Saved	Saved	Evicted				Returned	Saved	Walked	Returned	Saved	Saved	Saved	Nominee	Pre-Save	Evicted			
Francisco	Saved	Saved	Nominee	HOH	Nominee	Evicted								Returned	Saved	Pre-Save	Nominee	Nominee	Nominee	Pre-Save	Immune	Evicted				
Hans	Pre-Save	Saved	Saved	Saved	Saved	Saved	Saved	Saved	HOH	Nominee	HOH	Saved	Nominee	Immune			Saved	Saved	Nominee	Saved	Evicted					
Sebastián	Not in House			Entered	Immune		Walked							Returned	Saved	HOH	HOH	Nominee	Nominee	HOH	Walked					
Fernando	Saved	Saved	Saved	Saved	Evicted													Returned	Nominee	Evicted						
Raimundo	Not in House						Entered	Immune	Nominee	HOH	Nominee	Saved	Saved	Immune	Evicted		Saved	Saved	Evicted							
Alessia	Saved	Saved	Saved	Saved	Nominee	Saved	HOH	HOH	Saved	Nominee	Saved	HOH	Evicted	Returned	Saved	Saved	Saved	Evicted								
Catalina	Not in House										Entered	HOH	Nominee	Saved	Walked											
Lucas	Saved	Pre-Save	Saved	Saved	Saved	Saved	~~Walked~~	Saved	Evicted								Evicted									
Estefanía	Nominee	Saved	Evicted											Returned	Saved	Evicted										
Francisca	Nominee	Saved	Saved	Nominee	Saved	Saved	Saved	Saved	Pre-Save	Saved	Evicted			Returned	Nominee	Walked										
Ignacia	Not in House										Entered	Immune	Pre-Save	HOH	Pre-Save	Walked										
Federico	Not in House										Entered	Immune	HOH	Immune	Walked											
Monica	Saved	Saved	Saved	Saved	Saved	Saved	Saved	Saved	Nominee	Saved	Saved	Evicted														
Ruben	Saved	Saved	Saved	Nominee	HOH	Saved	Saved	Saved	Nominee	Saved	Saved	Ejected														
Trinidad	Saved	Nominee	Nominee	Nominee	Saved	Saved	Saved	Evicted																		
Maite	Saved	Saved	Saved	Evicted																						
Ariel	HOH	Evicted																								
Benjamin	Evicted																									
