= Secret Story (Spanish TV series) =

Reality television series

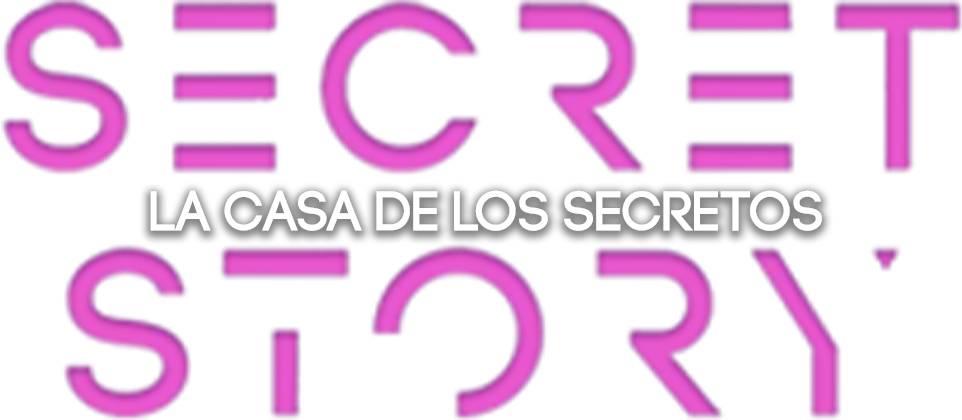
- Genre: Reality television
- Based on: Secret Story
- Directed by: María Zambrano
- Presented by: Jorge Javier Vázquez; Jordi González; Carlos Sobera; Lara Álvarez
- Original language: Spanish
- No. of seasons: 2

Production
- Production companies: Zeppelin TV; Mediaset España

Original release
- Network: Telecinco
- Release: September 9, 2021

Related
- Gran Hermano; Gran Hermano VIP

Secret Story (occasionally referred to as Secret Story: La casa de los secretos) is a Spanish reality competition television show based on the French series Secret Story and part of the franchise of the same name.

Like the original French version, the show is not a direct adaptation of the Big Brother franchise's format, created by producer John de Mol Jr. in 1997, but has a similar concept while including its own game mechanics, and is also produced and owned by Big Brother's production company Banijay Entertainment. The housemates are cut off from the outside world for ten to fifteen weeks in a house called "house of secrets", where every room is fitted with cameras. They have to keep a secret while trying to discover the other housemates' one.

== Format ==
A group of contestants, selected from a previous casting for the competition, live together in a house designed for that purpose (which includes hidden rooms, secret doors, passages, the white room - from which they can watch their fellow contestants - or the clues room, while retaining other rooms characteristic of the original format, such as the confession room and common areas), where they are filmed by cameras and microphones 24 hours a day. The housemates are completely forbidden from any contact with the outside world, also cancelling television, radio, internet, music, books, or pencils, among other things of lesser importance. They can only receive psychological help if they wish to do so. The duration of the program is approximately 3 months.

The participants have a secret to keep safe while trying to uncover their competitors' secrets through clues. Additionally, at the beginning of the season, a draw is held with 16 spheres, one of which contains 50,000 euros that will be awarded to one of the contestants - the one who proves to be the best investigator - without knowing it until the end of the competition. Thus, in relation to these two aspects, the contestant who believes they have guessed another's secret can activate the button of the cube (confession room) and present their allegations in the presence of "the voice," betting their sphere against the person whose secret they believe they know. At another time, both must face each other in private, where the accused has to justify themselves without revealing their secret. If, at the end of the ceremony, the accuser dares to confirm their hypothesis, they press the button again, but if they regret it because they think they have made a mistake, they do not press it, and there are no consequences. Then, if they are correct, they win the accused's sphere; otherwise, they lose theirs in favor of the latter. When a contestant is expelled without their secret being revealed, their sphere is put at stake through a test or left as an inheritance to the person of their choice.

"The voice" is an invisible character who can speak to the contestants at any time through the speakers and give them instructions. At the beginning of the game, this character imposes rules that the contestants must obey throughout the season if they do not want to be penalized. In addition, throughout the program, a phone appears from which "the voice" or the presenters themselves can offer privileges or counter-rewards to contestants who answer (immunity, direct nomination, etc.). "The voice" also has the ability to propose secret missions to one or more contestants, allowing them to obtain clues about their competitors' secrets.

Additionally, as an obligation, the contestants have different tasks to keep the house clean and must overcome weekly challenges proposed by the organization to earn money to buy food for the week. Each contestant receives a weekly budget to purchase food and other products, which will vary depending on their performance. The challenges are designed to test their teamwork skills.

Finally, each week, in a voting process, the contestants give the names of the housemates they want to see leave the house. Finally, those who obtain the highest score are nominated. After a week of waiting, the audience's decision is communicated, who have been voting to decide who should be expelled. At that moment, the chosen contestant must leave the house. An exclusive interview for the program then begins. The last person to remain in the house will be the winner of the 150,000 euros at stake.

== Season 1 (2021) ==
The first series premiered on 9 September 2021 and finished on 23 December 2021, running for 106 days. For the first time in the format's history, all housemates are celebrities. Throughout the game, all housemates have to keep a secret while trying to discover the other housemates' one.

=== Housemates and secrets ===
Contestants	Occupation/Known for being...	Secret
Adara Molinero	GH VIP 7 winner	"I made love in a mortuary" (undiscovered)
Bigote Arrocet	Comedian	"I'm my father's brother" (undisc.)
Canales Rivera	Bullfighter	"I lost my virginity to a trans person" (undisc.)
Cristina Porta	Sports journalist	"I wanted to be a nun & I've been offered to be escort" (disc. by Lucía)
Chimo Bayo	DJ & music producer	"I made a miracle" (undisc.)
Cynthia Martínez	Miss Barcelona 2007, Canales' ex-lover	"I had a relationship with a Real Madrid player" (undisc.)
Emmy Russ	Reality TV star	"I lived in a juvenile center because my mother abandoned me" (undisc.)
Fiama Rodríguez	LIDLT 1 participant	"I steal my lovers' underwear" (undisc.)
Gemeliers	Singers	"We will inherit a marquisate" (disc. by Luca)
Isabel Rábago	Former PP Media commun. manager	"I was a kelly" (disc. by Julen)
Julen de la Guerra	MYHYV star	"I have a physical anomaly I call warrior dolphin" (disc. by Gemeliers)
Luca Onestini	Reality TV star	"I became famous the day I was born" (discovered by Isabel)
Lucía Pariente	Alba Carrillo's mother	"My family does not know that I ripped them off" (undisc.)
Luis Rollán	TV panelist and actor	"I am a TV host's lover" (undiscovered)
Miguel Frigenti	TV panelist	"I was given the last rites" (undisc.)
Sandra Pica	LIDLT 2 temptress	"During my childhood, I was called suet ball with legs" (disc. by Gemeliers)
Sofía Cristo	DJ, Rey/Cristo's daughter	"I had an affair with a married woman" (undisc.)

=== Nominations table ===
Immunity winners	Week 1	Week 2	Week 3	Week 4	Week 5	Week 6	Week 7	Week 8	Week 9	Week 10	Week 11	Week 12	Week 13	Week 14	Final Week	
Immunity winners	Julen	none	Cristina	Julen	~~Canales~~	Cristina	Gemeliers	none	Luca	Julen	Gemeliers	Julen	Cristina; Sandra	none		
Luca	Chimo; Sandra; Cynthia	Isabel; Lucía; Sandra	Sandra; Lucía; Sofía	Fiama; Lucía; Emmy	Sandra; Lucía; Gemeliers	(6) Lucía; Canales; Sandra; Julen	(6) Julen (4) Canales (2) Sandra	Gemeliers; Sandra; Julen	Sandra; Julen; Cynthia	Sandra; Gemeliers; Isabel	Adara; Miguel; Sandra	Sandra; Miguel; Gemeliers	Nominated	(4) Sandra (2) Gemeliers	No; Nominations	Winner (Day 106)
Cristina	Emmy; Sandra; Fiama	Sandra; Fiama; Lucía	Sandra; Lucía; Cynthia	Fiama; Lucía; Emmy	Emmy; Lucía; ~~Cynthia~~	(6) Lucía; Canales; Sandra; Cynthia	Julen; Canales; Sandra	(6+1) Gemeliers; Julen; Sandra	Sandra; Julen; Gemeliers	Sandra; Gemeliers; Isabel	Adara; Miguel; Julen	Sandra; Miguel; Gemeliers	Immune	(4) Sandra (2) Gemeliers	No; Nominations	Runner-Up (Day 106)
Gemeliers	Emmy; Chimo; Bigote	Bigote; Sandra; Lucía	Miguel; Emmy; Luca	Cristina; Luca; Emmy	Emmy; Adara; Cristina	(6+1) Adara; Luca; Luis	(6) Luca (4) Cristina (2) Adara	Adara; Julen; Cristina	Sandra; Julen; Cristina	Cristina; Sandra; Luca	Adara; Miguel; Julen	Miguel; Luis; Luca	Nominated	(4) Luis (2) Cristina	No; Nominations	Third Finalist (Day 106)
Luis	Bigote; Emmy; Chimo	Cristina; Bigote; Miguel	Miguel; Cynthia; Canales	Cristina; Luca; Fiama	Emmy; Cristina; ~~Cynthia~~	Cynthia; Canales; Luca	Cynthia; Canales; Adara	Cynthia; Gemeliers; Adara	Cynthia; Gemeliers; Isabel	Luis; Gemeliers; Isabel	Adara; Miguel; Sandra	Miguel; Sandra; Gemeliers	Nominated	(2) Gemeliers (2) Sandra	No; Nominations	Evicted (Day 103)
Sandra	Cristina; Bigote; Chimo	Cristina; Miguel; Bigote	Miguel; Luca; Emmy	Luca; Cristina; Canales	Cristina; Emmy; Adara	Luca; Adara; Cynthia	(6) Cynthia (4) Cristina (2) Adara	(6+1) Cynthia; Cristina; Gemeliers	Cynthia; Cristina; Gemeliers	Cristina; Isabel; Luca	Adara; Miguel; Luca	Luca; Cristina; Miguel	Immune	Cristina	Evicted (Day 98)	
Julen	Emmy; Cristina; Bigote	Emmy	Miguel; Luca; Cynthia	Cristina; Luca; Isabel	Cristina; Adara; Emmy	(6+1) Luca; Adara; Isabel	(6) Cynthia (4) Isabel (2) Adara	(6) Cristina; Cynthia; Gemeliers; Isabel	Cynthia; Cristina; Isabel	Cristina; Isabel; Luca	Cristina; Miguel; Adara	Cristina; Luca; Gemeliers	Nominated	Evicted (Day 91)		
Miguel	Isabel; Canales; Emmy	Sandra; Isabel; Fiama	Sandra; Lucía; Julen	Evicted (Day 21)					Nominated	Exempt	Luca; Cristina; Luis	Cristina; Luca; Luis	Re-Evicted (Day 84)			
Adara	Not in House			Exempt	~~Cynthia~~; Julen; Lucía	Gemeliers; Lucía; Cynthia	Canales; Sandra; Cynthia	Cynthia; Isabel; Julen	Nominated	Exempt	Cristina; Luis; Julen	Re-Evicted (Day 77)				
Isabel	Miguel; Bigote; Chimo	Miguel; Bigote; Cristina	Miguel; Luca; Canales	Luca; Cristina; Canales	Adara; Emmy; Cristina	Canales; Lucía; Adara	(6) Canales (4) Julen (2) Adara	(6+1) Adara; Julen; Sandra	Julen; Sandra; Luis	Sandra; Luca; Luis	Evicted (Day 70)					
Cynthia	Chimo; Canales; Bigote	Bigote; Miguel; Luca	Miguel; Canales; Luca	Luca; Cristina; Canales	Adara; Cristina; Emmy	(6+1) Adara; Luca; Sandra	(6) Sandra (4) Julen (2) Adara	Adara; Sandra; Julen	Sandra; Julen; Luis	Evicted (Day 63)						
Canales	Miguel; Emmy; Cynthia	Miguel; Fiama; Sofía	Miguel; Cynthia; Emmy	Luca; Cristina; Emmy	Cristina; Adara; Emmy	Adara; Luca; Isabel	(6) Luca (4) Adara (2) Cynthia	Evicted (Day 49)								
Lucía	Chimo; Cristina; Miguel	Miguel; Cristina; Luca	Miguel; Luca; Gemeliers	Luca; Cristina; Gemeliers	Adara; Cristina; Emmy	(6+1) Luca; Adara; Cynthia	Evicted (Day 42)		Nominated	Re-Evicted (Day 63)						
Emmy	Cristina; Canales; Bigote	Miguel; Canales; Bigote	Miguel; Canales; Julen	Cristina; Luca; Canales	Adara; Cristina; Julen	Evicted (Day 35)										
Fiama	Cristina; Chimo; Miguel	Cristina; Canales; Miguel	Miguel; Luca; Cynthia	Luca; Cristina; Luis	Luca	Evicted (Day 28)										
Sofía	Emmy; Chimo; Cristina	Cristina; Miguel; Canales	Miguel; Luca; Canales	Ejected (Day 19)												
Bigote	Sandra; Cynthia; Emmy	Isabel; Luis; Cynthia	Evicted (Day 14)													
Chimo	Luca; Cynthia; Fiama	Evicted (Day 7)														
Nominated for eviction	Chimo; Cristina; Emmy	Bigote; Cristina; Emmy; Miguel	Luca; Miguel; Sandra	Cristina; Cynthia; Fiama; Luca	Adara; Canales; Cristina; Cynthia; Emmy; Luca	Adara; Isabel; Lucía	Canales; Julen; Sandra	Adara; Cynthia; Gemeliers	Cynthia; Julen; Sandra	Cristina; Isabel; Luca	Adara; Cristina; Miguel	Cristina; Luca; Miguel; Sandra	Gemeliers; Julen; Luca; Luis	Gemeliers; Luis; Sandra	none	
Ejected	none		Sofía	none												
Evicted	Chimo; 74,4% to eliminate	Bigote; 75,6% to eliminate	Miguel; 51,7% to eliminate	Fiama; 64,1% to eliminate	Emmy; 54,5% to eliminate	Lucía; 58,2% to eliminate	Canales; 69,2% to eliminate	Adara; 52,2% to eliminate	Cynthia; 52,9% to eliminate	Isabel; 81,9% to eliminate	Adara; 52% to eliminate	Miguel; 54,8% to eliminate	Julen; 57,5% to eliminate	Sandra; 51,2% to eliminate	Luis; 1% to win	Cristina; 41,1% to win (out of 2)
Evicted	Chimo; 74,4% to eliminate	Bigote; 75,6% to eliminate	Miguel; 51,7% to eliminate	Fiama; 64,1% to eliminate	Emmy; 54,5% to eliminate	Lucía; 58,2% to eliminate	Canales; 69,2% to eliminate	Adara; 52,2% to eliminate	Cynthia; 52,9% to eliminate	Isabel; 81,9% to eliminate	Adara; 52% to eliminate	Miguel; 54,8% to eliminate	Julen; 57,5% to eliminate	Sandra; 51,2% to eliminate	Gemeliers; Fewest votes to win (out of 3)	Luca; 58,9% to win

=== Total nominations received ===
	Week 1	Week 2	Week 3	Week 4	Week 5	Week 6	Week 7	Week 8	Week 9	Week 10	Week 11	Week 12	Week 13	Week 14	Final	Total
Luca	3	2	14	26	-	27	12	2	-	5	4	8	-	0	No Nominations	103
Cristina	14	15	-	24	18	-	8	9	5	9	8	8	-	3	No Nominations	121
Gemeliers	0	0	1	1	1	3	-	17	4	6	-	4	-	6	No Nominations	43
Luis	0	2	0	1	0	1	0	0	2	4	3	3	-	4	No Nominations	20
Sandra	7	9	9	0	3	5	15	6	14	11	2	8	-	10	Evicted	99
Julen	-	0	2	-	3	1	13	7	11	-	3	-	-	Evicted		40
Miguel	8	20	33	Evicted					-	–	12	11	Re-Evicted			74
Adara	Not in House			–	17	28	15	16	-	–	16	Re-Evicted				92
Isabel	3	8	0	1	0	2	4	3	2	7	Evicted					30
Cynthia	6	1	7	-	-	7	18	18	10	Evicted						67
Canales	6	5	7	4	-	11	17	Evicted								50
Lucía	0	4	6	4	5	17	Evicted		-	Re-Evicted						36
Emmy	18	-	4	4	14	Evicted										40
Fiama	2	5	0	7	Evicted											14
Sofía	0	1	1	Ejected												2
Bigote	11	12	Evicted													23
Chimo	18	Evicted														18

== Season 2 (2022) ==
A second series premiered on 13 January 2022 and finished on 7 April 2022, running for 85 days. For the first time since Gran Hermano Revolution, Telecinco will do a series of the format with just civilian housemates.

=== Housemates and secrets ===
Contestants	Hometown	Age	Occupation	Secrets	Duration	Status
Rafa Martínez	Cuenca	28	Plumber	My boss broke up her marriage for me (disc. by Marta)	1 - 85	Winner
Marta Jurado	Teruel	27	Deputy mayor	Whenever I'm bored at sex, I fall asleep (undisc.)	1 - 85	Runner-up
Adrián Tello	Calatayud	26	Elementary teacher	I lied to my parents for a big love (undisc.)	1 - 85	3rd Place
Carlos Peña	Madrid	27	Model	I was a catechist and I almost became a priest (disc. by Cora)	1 - 78	4th Place
Cora Vaquero	Barcelona	25	Beautician	I used the hunger queues to make a living (undisc.)	1 - 74	5th Place
Sara Cruz	Santa Cruz	20	Marketing student	none	57 - 71	11th Evicted
David Colchero	Seville	24	Scrapping employee	I got a sister I never met (undisc.)	1 - 71	10th Evicted
Álvaro López	Albacete	27	City hall auditor	I’ve performed an autopsy (undisc.)	4 - 64	9th Evicted
Laila Lahr	Málaga	27	Secretary	Our mom preferred money over us (with Nissy, undisc.)	1 - 57	8th Evicted
Carmen Nadales	Badajoz	26	Mathematics' student	I'm a virgin (undisc.)	1 - 53	Ejected
Alatzne Mateos	Urretxu	44	Emergency technician	I intoxicated my neighbourhood with croquettes (undisc.)	1 - 50	7th Evicted
Nissy Lahr	Murcia	27	Waitress	Our mom preferred money over us (with Laila, undisc.)	1 - 46	6th Evicted
Virginia Sanz	Cádiz	27	Tour guide	I hooked up with an actor 20 years older than me (undisc.)	1 - 43	5th Evicted
Brenda Bolarín	Madrid	40	Sweeper	I got addicted to eating scourers (undisc.)	1 - 36	4th Evicted
Kenny Álvarez	Barcelona	30	Model and dancer	I was infatuated with a mom's friend (undisc.)	1 - 32	Walked
Alberto Maroto	Madrid	36	Barista and model	I was so overweight that I never went out (undisc.)	1 - 28	3rd Evicted
Elena Olmo	Berlin	26	Sales consultant	I scammed my friends with luxury brands (undisc.)	1 - 21	2nd Evicted
Héctor Cruz	Santa Cruz	42	Photographer	I cheated on my girlfriend with more than 100 people (undisc.)	1 - 14	1st Evicted

=== Nominations table ===
	Week 1	Week 2	Week 3	Week 4	Week 5	Week 6	Week 7	Week 8	Week 9	Week 10	Week 11		Week 12 Final			
Immune	No Immunity Test	Laila & Nissy	Laila & Nissy	Laila & Nissy	No Immunity Test	No Immunity Test	No Immunity Test	No Immunity Test	No Immunity Test	Sara	No Immunity Test	No Immunity Test	No Immunity Test			
Rafa	No; Nominations	Héctor; Adrián; Virginia	Not eligible	Nominated	Adrián; Marta; Kenny	Nominated	Marta; Adrián; Colchero	Adrián; Cora; Carlos	Colchero; Adrián; Marta	Adrián; Colchero	Marta; Sara; Adrián	No; Nominations	Winner (Day 85)			
Marta	No; Nominations	Álvaro; Héctor; Alatzne	Elena; Álvaro; Rafa	Virginia to save	Rafa; Laila; Álvaro	Nominated	Alatzne; Carlos; Nissy	Rafa; Carmen; Laila	Rafa; Álvaro; Cora	Rafa; Cora	Sara; Rafa; Cora	No; Nominations	Runner-up (Day 85)			
Adrián	No; Nominations	Álvaro; Alatzne; Rafa	Elena; Rafa; Carmen	Marta to save	Rafa; Álvaro; Laila	Exempt	Laila; Alatzne; Carmen	Rafa; Carmen; Álvaro	Rafa; Álvaro; Cora	Rafa; Carlos	Sara; Rafa; Carlos	No; Nominations	Third Finalist (Day 85)			
Carlos	No; Nominations	Álvaro; Rafa; Héctor	Rafa; Carmen; Álvaro	Colchero to save	Rafa; Álvaro; Carmen	Exempt	Álvaro; Rafa; Nissy	Rafa; Carmen; Álvaro	Álvaro; Rafa; Colchero	Colchero; Rafa	Adrián; Cora; Marta	No; Nominations	Fourth Finalist (Day 78)			
Cora	No; Nominations	Alatzne; Álvaro; Héctor	Alatzne; Rafa; Carmen	Brenda to save	Álvaro; Rafa; Carmen	Exempt	Carmen; Nissy; Rafa	Carmen; Rafa; Álvaro	Rafa; Álvaro; Marta	Rafa; Carlos	Sara; Marta; Carlos	No; Nominations	Fifth Finalist (Day 74)			
Sara	Not in House								Exempt	Adrián; Marta	Adrián; Marta; Rafa	Evicted (Day 71)				
Colchero	No; Noms.	Álvaro; Alatzne; Rafa	Rafa; Elena; Carmen	Adrián to save	Álvaro; Rafa; Alatzne	Nominated	Nissy; Rafa; Álvaro	Rafa; Carmen; Álvaro	Rafa; Carlos; Álvaro	Rafa; Carlos	Evicted (Day 71)					
Álvaro	Not in House	Héctor; Adrián; Colchero	(6) Elena	Nominated	Kenny; Adrián; Virginia	Nominated	Carlos; Colchero; Adrián	Rafa; Carmen; Colchero	Adrián; Colchero; Marta	Evicted (Day 64)						
Laila	No; Noms.	Rafa; Alatzne; Álvaro	(4) Carmen (2) Rafa	Cora to save	Not eligible	Nominated	Alatzne; Cora; Colchero	Carmen; Marta; Carlos	Evicted (Day 57)							
Carmen	No; Noms.	Héctor; Adrián; Brenda	(6) Cora	Nominated	Laila; Cora; Kenny	Exempt	Cora; Laila; Alatzne	Laila; Cora; Álvaro	Ejected (Day 53)							
Alatzne	No; Noms.	Héctor; Adrián; Marta	Not eligible	Nominated	Rafa; Laila; Álvaro	Nominated	Cora; Carlos; Rafa	Evicted (Day 50)								
Nissy	No; Noms.	Rafa; Alatzne; Álvaro	(4) Carmen (2) Rafa	Cora to save	Nominated	Exempt	Alatzne; Cora; Colchero	Evicted (Day 46)								
Virginia	No; Noms.	Álvaro; Héctor; Rafa	(2) Carmen (2) Rafa (1) Álvaro (1) Alatzne	Kenny to save	Rafa; Álvaro; Laila	Nominated	Evicted (Day 43)									
Brenda	No; Noms.	Elena; Héctor; Álvaro	(3) Carmen (3) Rafa	Carlos to save	Nominated	Evicted (Day 36)										
Kenny	No; Noms.	Álvaro; Marta; Elena	Not eligible	~~Alberto~~; ~~to save~~	Rafa; Álvaro; Carmen	Walked (Day 32)										
Alberto	No; Noms.	Álvaro; Brenda; Marta	Carmen; Rafa; Álvaro	Nominated	Evicted (Day 28)											
Elena	No; Noms.	Álvaro; Héctor; Rafa	Alatzne; Rafa; Álvaro	Evicted (Day 21)												
Héctor	No; Noms.	Álvaro; Virginia; Marta	Evicted (Day 14)													
Nominations notes	1	2	3, 4	5, 6	7, 8	9	10	*	*	11	*	12	13, 14, 15			
Nominated for eviction	All housemates	Alatzne; Álvaro; Carmen; Héctor	Alatzne; Carmen; Elena; Rafa	Alatzne; Alberto; Álvaro; Carmen; Rafa	Adrián; Álvaro; Brenda; ~~Kenny~~; Laila; Nissy; Rafa	Alatzne; Álvaro; Colchero; Laila; Marta; Rafa; Virginia	Alatzne; Carlos; Cora; Nissy	Álvaro; Carlos; ~~Carmen~~; Cora; Laila; Rafa	Adrián; Álvaro; Colchero; Rafa	Adrián; Carlos; Colchero; Rafa	Adrián; Marta; Rafa; Sara	Adrián; Carlos; Cora; Marta; Rafa	Adrián; Carlos; Marta; Rafa			
Evicted	Carmen; Most votes to be nominated	Héctor; 78% to evict out of 2	Elena; 85.9% to evict out of 2	Alberto; 56.7% to evict out of 3	Brenda; 56.4% to evict out of 2	Virginia; 60% to evict out of 3	Nissy; 44.5% (out of 4); Alatzne; 47.2% (out of 3)	Laila; 78% to evict out of 2	Álvaro; 60.7% to evict out of 2	Colchero; 51.1% to evict out of 2	Sara; 44% to evict out of 4	Cora; 1.1% 5th Finalist	Carlos; 2.5% 4th Finalist	Adrián; 5% 3rd Finalist	Marta; 23.9% Runner; Up	Rafa; 76.1% Winner

==== Notes ====
- ^Note *: Classical nominations
- ^Note 1: On the first launch show the audience could choose to nominate a contestant (except Alvaro). They chose Carmen.
- ^Note 2: Alvaro entered on day 4 with an egg representing immunity. If he could keep it until day 7, he will be immune on week 1. Laila & Nissy were able to stole it on day 5 and they were immune on week 1.
- ^Note 3: On week 3 they had to make pairs for the nominations. Kenny ended up alone, not having the chance to nominate but had the power of saving one nominee and change it for another contestant. He did not use this power.
- ^Note 4: In pairs, they had to decide a shape: circle (usual nominations), triangle (they could split 6 points the way they wanted) or square (ineligible to nominate).
- ^Note 5: For the first time the nominations were made in such a way that one contestant chose another to be saved. The last 4 contestants would make up the list of nominees. Laila and Nissy won the egg so they started.
- ^Note 6: The egg also brought with it the power of direct nomination, Alberto being the chosen one.
- ^Note 7: Since Week 5, Laila and Nissy were separated from each other.
- ^Note 8: Brenda and Nissy were nominated by the organisation after a week of high argues.
- ^Note 9: For this nomination game, they had to make pairs, and one member would be saved and the other nominated, and if not, both of them nominated.
- ^Note 10: For this nomination game, they had to make pairs, one teammate would nominate and the other, a member of his family would nominate instead of him.
- ^Note 11: Contestants nominated with 1 and 2 points.
- ^Note 12: After Sara's eviction, Adrián, Carlos, Cora, Marta and Rafa lasted as finalists. The 5th Finalist was proclaimed on Day 74.
- ^Note 13: After Cora was proclaimed 5th Finalist, Adrián, Carlos, Marta and Rafa remained as finalists.
- ^Note 14: After Carlos was proclaimed 4th Finalist, Adrián, Marta and Rafa remained as finalists.
- ^Note 15: After Adrián was proclaimed 3rd Finalist, Marta and Rafa remained as finalists.

=== Total nominations received ===
	Week 1	Week 2	Week 3	Week 4	Week 5	Week 6	Week 7	Week 8	Week 9	Week 10	Week 11		Week 12 (Final)	Total
Rafa	–	9	22	–	22	–	6	17	14	9	5	–	Winner	104
Marta	–	5	0	–	2	–	3	3	3	1	8	–	Runner-up	25
Adrián	–	8	0	–	5	–	3	3	5	4	7	–	3rd Finalist	35
Carlos	–	0	0	–	0	–	7	2	2	3	2	–	4th Finalist	16
Cora	–	0	6	–	2	–	8	4	2	1	3	–	5th Finalist	26
Sara	Out From the House								–	–	11	Evicted		11
Colchero	–	1	0	–	0	–	4	1	6	3	Evicted			15
Álvaro	Out	31	6	–	16	–	4	5	10	Evicted				72
Laila	–	–	–	–	9	–	5	4	Evicted					18
Carmen	–	–	17	–	3	–	4	16	Ejected					40
Alatzne	–	10	7	–	1	–	9	Evicted						27
Nissy	–	–	–	–	–	–	7	Evicted						7
Virginia	–	3	0	–	1	–	Evicted							4
Brenda	–	3	0	–	–	Evicted								3
Kenny	–	0	0	–	5	Walked								5
Alberto	–	0	0	–	Evicted									0
Elena	–	4	14	Evicted										18
Héctor	–	22	Evicted											22

=== Blind results ===
Week	1stPlace to Evict	2ndPlace to Evict	3rdPlace to Evict	4thPlace to Evict	5thPlace to Evict	6thPlace to Evict	7thPlace to Evict
2	59.9%	16.2%	15.8%	8.1%			
2	61%	16%	15%	8%			
2	71%	15%	14%				
3	84.0%	10.0%	3.1%	2.9%			
3	79%	11%	6%	4%			
3	84.9%	11.1%	4.0%				
3	82.8%	11.1%	6.1%				
3	85.9%	14.1%					
4	57%	14%	11%	10%	8%		
4	57.2%	22.9%	19.9%				
5	42%	25%	14%	9%	5%	4%	1%
5	50.4%	31.3%	18.3%				
5	49.6%	33.8%	16.6%				
5	50.7%	34.7%	14.6%				
5	56.4%	43.6%					
6	59%	20%	9%	6%	3%	2%	1%
6	61%	25%	14%				
6	60.7%	25.3%	14.0%				
6	60.0%	25.6%	14.4%				
7	42%	28%	23%	7%			
7	43%	28%	22%	7%			
7	47.3%	34.7%	18.0%				
7	47.2%	33.2%	19.6%				
8	60.4%	19.1%	14.6%	3.4%	2.5%		
8	60.1%	19.4%	14.4%	3.5%	2.6%		
8	60.0%	19.3%	14.2%	3.4%	3.1%		
8	64%	20%	16%				
8	66.8%	18.5%	14.7%				
8	78%	22%					
9	62%	35%	2%	1%			
9	62%	38%					
9	60.7%	39.3%					
10	58%	28%	10%	4%			
10	56.7%	43.3%					
10	50.5%	49.5%					
10	51.1%	48.9%					
11	44%	34%	18%	4%			
12	72.4%*	17.0%*	7.3%	2.2%	1.1%		
12	69.5%*	21.4%*	6.6%	2.5%			
12	76.1%	23.9%					
