= Emilio Bofill =

Spanish builder

Emilio Bofill Benessat, in Catalan Emili Bofill i Benessat (1907–2000) was a Spanish builder with a strong background in architecture. He has been described as "the constructor whom every architect wanted to build their work."

== Life ==
Emilio Bofill was born in 1907 in an established Catalan family. His father Josep Maria Bofill i Pichot (1860–1938) was a physician and entomologist, involved in prominent local scientific institutions such as the Institute for Catalan Studies, the Catalan Institute of Natural History, and the Royal Academy of Sciences and Arts of Barcelona.

He studied at Escola Tècnica Superior d'Arquitectura de Barcelona, graduating in 1931, together with a group of significant Catalan architects that included José Iváñez Baldó, Josep Torres Clavé, Josep Soteras i Mauri, Miguel López González, Marino Canosa and Ricard Ribas i Seva. He did not become a licensed architect, however, and thus is generally referenced only as builder even in projects for which he actually was instrumental in the design. He kept close involvement with the GATCPAC group of modernist architects, and was a longstanding friend of Antoni Bonet i Castellana and Josep Lluís Sert as well as of Joan Miró. In a study of the early years of Ricardo Bofill Taller de Arquitectura, author Pedro García Hernández wrote that "many architects who aspired to do something new or different insisted that Emilio Bofill's firm should be the one building their works, in order to secure collaboration and holistic understanding of the project."

Bofill participated in the Spanish Civil War, in the Spanish Republican Armed Forces. Following the final defeat of the Republican side in 1939, he was acquitted by a court-martial (consell de guerra). He kept a lifelong commitment to the Catalan republican cause and to its torch-bearer the ERC party, even though he was no linguistic nationalist and favored the use of Castilian over Catalan. His son Ricardo would describe him as "republican, liberal, progressive, austere and logical."

He married Maria Levi (1909–1991), who in the postwar era became a significant sponsor of Catalan literature. They had three children, José María (born 1936), Ricardo (born 1939) and Anna (born 1944). José María ("Nino") died from tuberculosis in 1951. Ricardo became one of the most important architects of his generation; he died in January 2022. Anna became a recognized musician and feminist activist after an early career in architecture.

In the postwar period, Emilio Bofill's building firm had its office in the Banco de Vizcaya building on Plaça de Catalunya 5. Among the projects he built, one that stands out is the house known as La Ricarda in El Prat de Llobregat, by Antoni Bonet i Castellana, between the airport's runways and the sea, now a museum.

In the early 1960s, Emilio Bofill helped and mentored his surviving son's creation of a multidisciplinary team which in 1963 became Ricardo Bofill Taller de Arquitectura. Emilio Bofill was thus involved in the design and construction of all the early major projects of the Taller. He also worked with Xavier Corberó in the early stages of creation of his palatial house and architectural complex in Esplugues de Llobregat and restoration of nearby houses.

After retiring from his building activity in the 1970s, Emilio Bofill dedicated himself to reform of the College of the Rosary (previously, Poor Orphans' College) in Sant Julià de Vilatorta near Vic, an inland town to the north of Barcelona where he owned land and a family house. One of the college's main rooms is named after him.

== Projects ==
With Ricardo Bofill Taller de Arquitectura:

- Apartment building on Calle Bach 28, Barcelona (1963)
- Apartment building on Calle Nicaragua 97–99, Barcelona (1964)
- Apartment building on Calle Bach 4 / Plaza Sant Gregori Taumaturg, Barcelona (1965)
- El Castillo de Kafka apartment complex in Sant Pere de Ribes (1965–1968)
- Xanadu apartment complex, Calp (1966–1971)
- La Muralla Roja apartment complex, Calp (1968–1973)
- Family house in Mont-ras (1973)
- Walden 7 apartment complex, Sant Just Desvern (1970–1975)

Other works:

- Project for the Barcelona Outer Harbor (1931)
- La Ricarda House in El Prat de Llobregat (1948–1963)
- Villa Tupinetti, Sitges (1970)
- Casa Baccheli, Cadaqués (1968–1971)
- Corberó House / Can Cargol, Esplugues de Llobregat (1972)
- Restaurant Il Giardinetto, Barcelona (1973)
