= Ricardo Emilio Bofill =

Spanish architect, author and director (born 1965)

Ricardo Emilio Bofill (born 1965 in Barcelona), full Spanish name Ricardo Emilio Bofill Vergano, also known as Ricardo Bofill Jr., is a Spanish architect, author and film director from Catalonia. As of late January 2022, he was co-head of the architecture and design firm Ricardo Bofill Taller de Arquitectura (RBTA), jointly with his half-brother Pablo Bofill.

== Biography ==
Ricardo Emilio Bofill is the son of architect Ricardo Bofill, who founded RBTA in 1963, and of Italian actress Serena Vergano. He went to school at St. Peter's School, then at Escola Ausiàs March, both in Barcelona. He studied architecture at Rice University School of Architecture in Houston, then at Harvard Graduate School of Design, and real estate development at Columbia University. In September 1993 he married socialite Chabeli Iglesias; they separated in early 1995. From 1995 to early 2004 he was in a relationship with Mexican singer Paulina Rubio.

He joined RBTA in the late 1990s and has participated in the design of projects in China, India, and Russia.

== Works ==
=== Fiction ===
- Perséfone (in Spanish), Barcelona: Editorial Planeta, 1995
- Bajo mi piel (in Spanish), Barcelona: Editorial Planeta, 1998

=== Film ===
- Hot milk (in Spanish, featuring actors Macarena Gómez and Enrique San Francisco among others), 2005

== See also ==
- List of works by Bofill Taller de Arquitectura
