= Jean-Pierre Carniaux =

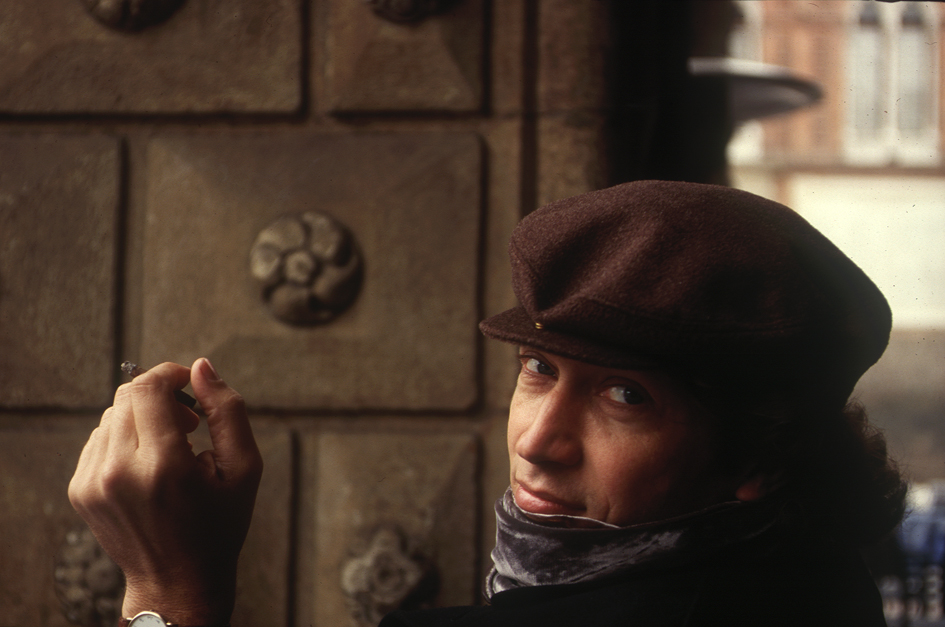
- Born: 1 February 1951 (age 75); Paris, France
- Occupation: Architect

== Biography ==
Carniaux studied Mathematics at the University of Paris, from which he graduated in 1972. He then studied at Massachusetts Institute of Technology and received a B.A. in Art and Design (1974) and a Master of Architecture (1976).

He joined Ricardo Bofill Taller de Arquitectura (RBTA) in 1976. In 1986 he was in charge of opening the firm's office in New York City, which he led until 1990. He was Senior Partner at RBTA until 2020.

== Work ==
Jean-Pierre Carniaux’s design work has included the design of the National Theater of Catalonia, the Antigone new district in Montpellier (240,000 m2), the Shiseido representative building in Ginza, Lazona Kawasaki Plaza, as well as the design of perfume bottles for Christian Dior. He has participated in the projects of the New Terminal 1 at Barcelona Airport and Madrid Congress Center.

== Selected projects as Senior Partner at Bofill Arquitectura ==
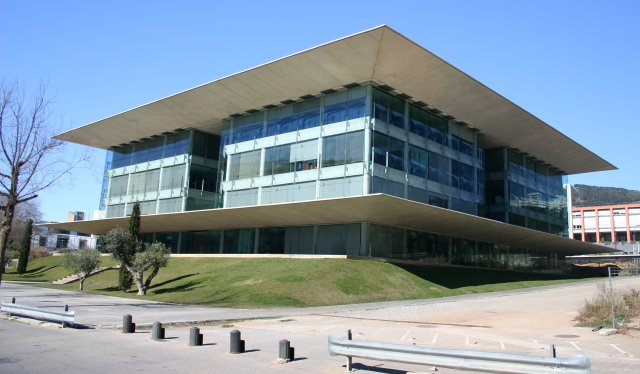
View Nexus II

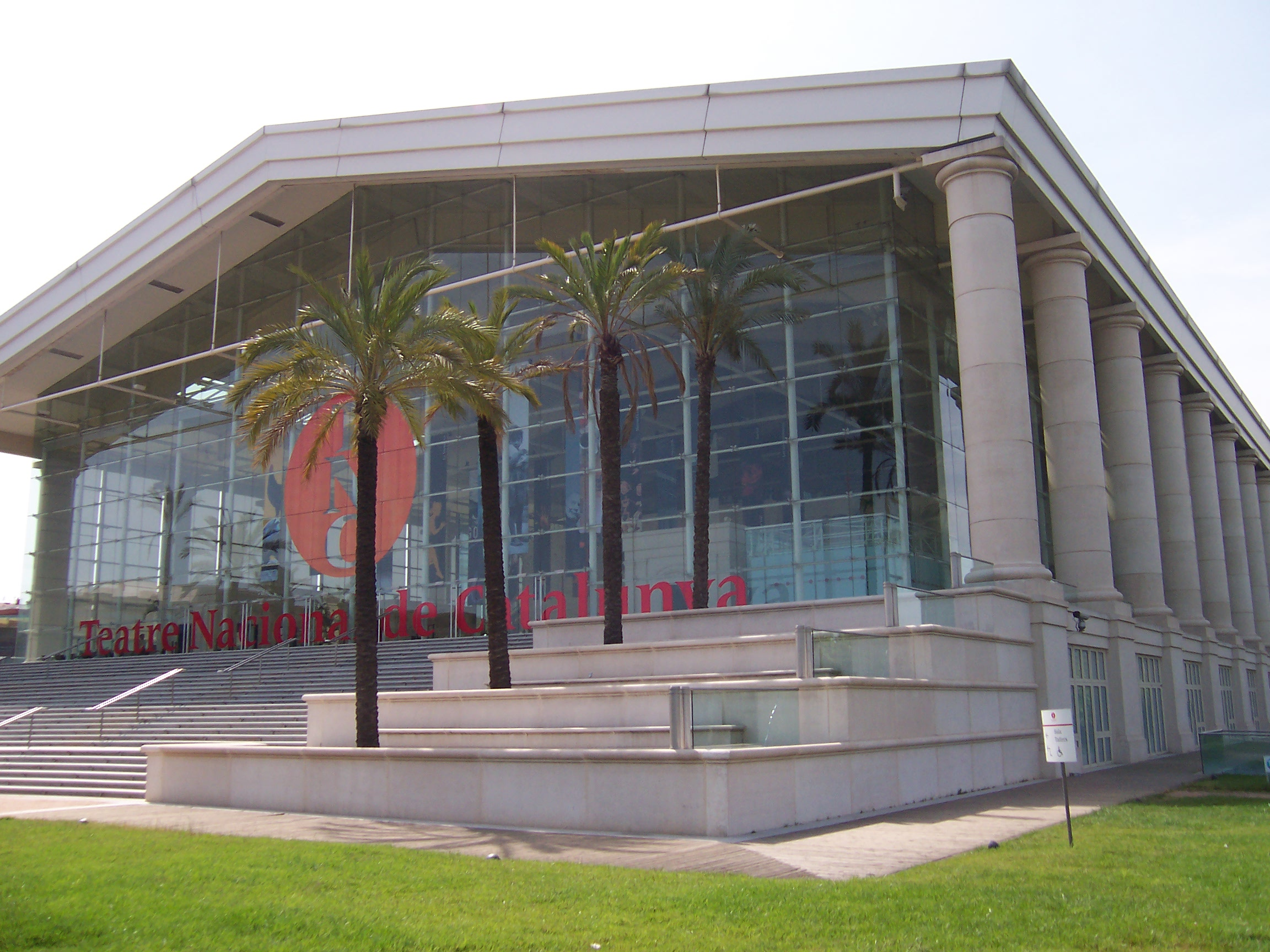
Principal entrance Theatre National of Catalonia

- W Barcelona, 2009, Barcelona, Spain
- Shangri.la hotel, 2008, Beijing, China
- Supershine Upper East side, 2008, Beijing, China
- La Place de l’Europe, 2007, Luxembourg
- La Porte, 2004, Luxembourg
- Corso II, 2004, Prague, Czech Republic
- Cartier headquarters, 2003, Paris, France
- Competition for Qingdao Sail Base (Olympic Games 2008), 2003, Qingdao, China
- Crystal Karlín, 2002, Prague, Czech Republic
- Logistic Park office complex, 2002, Barcelona, Spain
- Nexus II, 2002, Barcelona, Spain
- Platinum Tower, 2002, Beirut, Lebanon
- Colombo’s Resort, 2001, Porto Santo Island, Portugal
- Shiseido New Ginza Building, 2001, Tokyo, Japan
- Kawasaki Project, 2001, Tokyo, Japan
- Funchalcentrum, 2001, Funchal, Madeira, Portugal
- Compave Building, 2001, Lisbon, Portugal
- Axa Headquarters, 2000, Paris, France
- Corso, 2000, Prague, Czech Republic
- Savona Sea Port, 2000, Savona, Italy
- Corso Karlin, 2000, Prague, Czech Republic
- Nova Karlin District, 1999, Prague, Czech Republic
- Aoyama Palacio, 1999, Tokyo, Japan
- The New Port Mouth of Barcelona, 1999, Barcelona, Spain
- Crystal Palace, 1998, Prague, Czech Republic
- Manzanares Park, 1998, Madrid, Spain
- National Theatre of Catalonia, 1997, Barcelona, Spain
- Plateau Kirchberg, 1996, Luxembourg
- Piscine Olympique de Montpellier, 1996, Montpellier, France
- Reinhold Tower, 1993, Madrid, Spain
- Villa Olímpica Housing Complex, 1991, Barcelona, Spain
- Kobe Sea Port, 1991, Kobe, Japan
- Hotel Mercure, 1991, Montpellier, France
- L’Aire des Volcans, 1991, Clermont-Ferrand, France
- Le Capitole & Le Parnasse, 1990, Montpellier, France
- Port Juvenal, 1989, Montpellier, France
- Vieux Port De Montreal, 1989, Montréal, Canada
- Arsenal Music Center, 1988, Metz, France
- Domaine Chateau Lafite-Rothschild, 1988, Bordeaux, France
- Hotel de La Région Languedoc-Roussillon, 1988, Montpellier, France
- Central Park North, 1987, New York City, US
- Les Echelles de La Ville, 1986, Montpellier, France
- Port Imperial, 1985, New Jersey, US
- Corner Condominium, 1985, New York City, US
- Jefferson Tower, 1985, New York City, US
- La Place du Nombre D’Or, 1984, Montpellier, France
- Les Espaces d’Abraxas, 1983, Marne-la-Vallée, Paris, France
- Antigone District, 1978–2000, Montpellier, France

== See also ==
- Peter Hodgkinson (architect)
- Nabil Gholam
