= Annabelle d'Huart =

French visual artist

Annabelle d'Huart (born 1952 in Paris) is a French visual artist. D'Huart's work includes photography, painting, ceramics, jewelry, drawing, and sculpture.

== Life ==
D'Huart was born in an established family in Paris. Her grandfather had been one of the creators of the Aix-en-Provence Festival.

=== Education and Career ===
She studied art and design at École Camondo in Paris. She started her career as a photographer and was encouraged by Ralph Gibson to establish herself in New York City, where she befriended Nicholas Vreeland at the time when he was working with Richard Avedon. While in New York, she photographed celebrity artists including Richard Serra, Donald Judd, Sol LeWitt, Ellsworth Kelly, Brice Marden, Dan Flavin, Cy Twombly, and Frank Stella.

She met Ricardo Bofill in the 1970s and in 1980 they had a son, Pablo Bofill. She worked with Ricardo Bofill Taller de Arquitectura in the 1980s, participating in the firm's design work and writing about their projects and methodologies.

She had the first show of her paintings in 1989, using gouache as her medium. She spent time in the 1990s in Marrakesh where she had a workshop and had some of her work exhibited at the Menara gardens pavillon. She has created jewellery since 1991.

In 2004 she had a solo show of her late-1970s photography at the Paula Cooper Gallery in New York City.

From 2007 to 2010 she was an artist-in-residence at Sèvres – Cité de la céramique, the premier center for ceramic art in France, where she created jewellery. She also created tapestry for the Gobelins Manufactory.

== Work ==
She has designed jewelry for Karl Lagerfeld at Chanel in 2000, and for Yohji Yamamoto in 2007. Her ceramics have been inspired by past artists, such as Piero della Francesca and Émile-Jacques Ruhlmann in 2006.

Her sculpture has used terracotta, cedar wood and bronze.

Her ceramic collection "Atlantide", designed for the Manufacture nationale de Sèvres, is on display at the French National Ceramic Museum. Her Talisman necklace is in the collections of the Solomon R. Guggenheim Museum, and her some of her jewellery creations have been on sale at the Musée des Arts Décoratifs in Paris.

She is the author of several books:

- Harems, Paris: Hachette, 1980
- Ricardo Bofill, Les Espaces d'Abraxas: El Palacio, El Teatro, El Arco, Paris: L’Equerre, 1981
- Ricardo Bofill – Taller de Arquitectura, Barcelona: Gustavo Gili, 1985, and Paris: Le Moniteur, 1989
- Cy Twombly: Fifty Days at Iliam (with contributions from Carlos Basualdo, Richard A. Fletcher, Emily Greenwood, Olena Chervonik, and Nicola Del Roscio), New Haven: Yale University Press, 2018
