= Antigone, Montpellier =

Neighborhood of the city of Montpellier, France

Coordinates: 43.6080°N 3.89°W

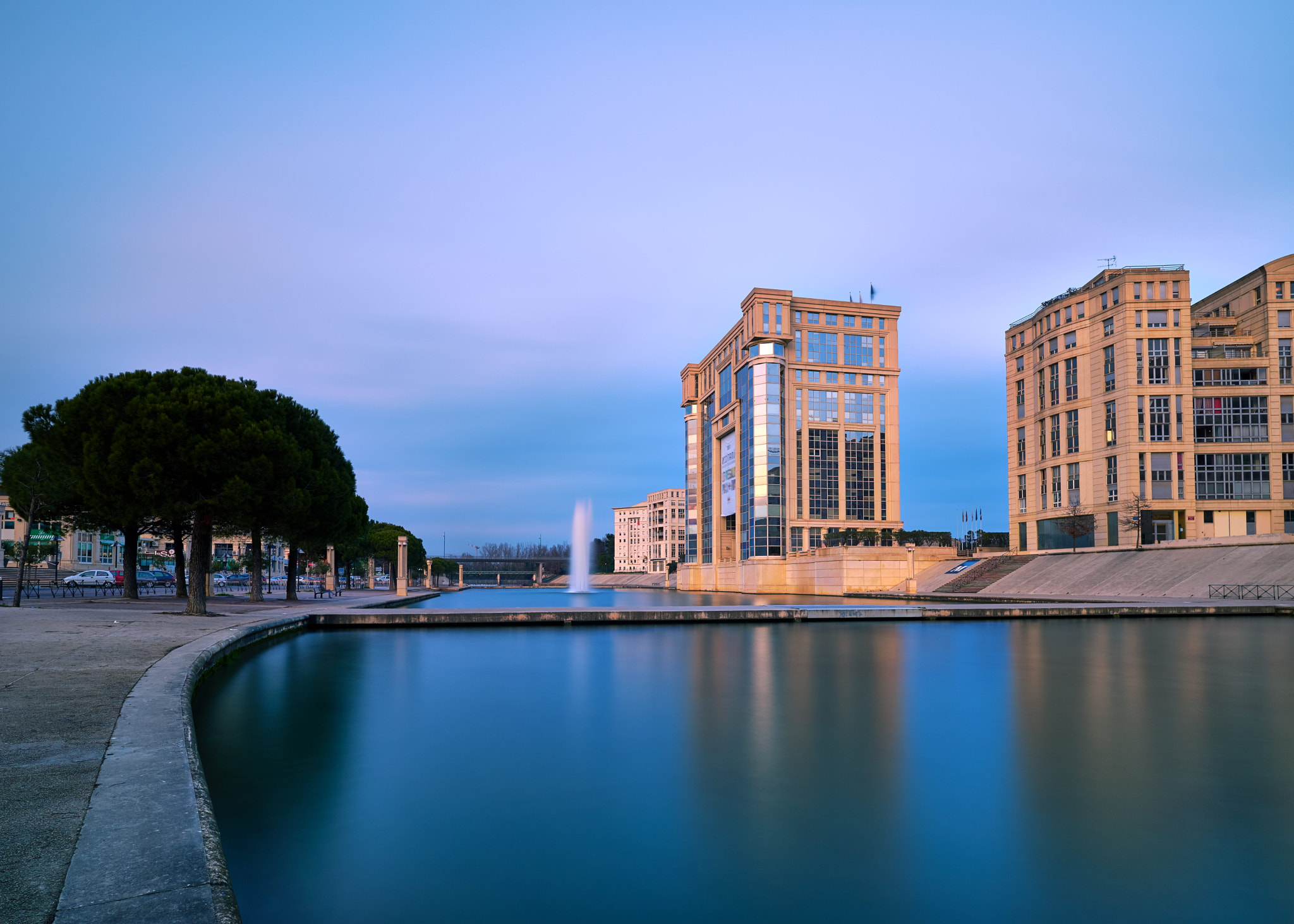
Antigone

Antigone is a neighbourhood of Montpellier, France, east of the city centre. It is best known for its architectural design by Ricardo Bofill Taller de Arquitectura.

== History and design ==
The district is built on the grounds of the former Joffre Barracks, of which only Montpellier's citadel remains. In 1977, Mayor Georges Frêche started the process that led to the construction of the district.

The district's architect was the Spaniard Ricardo Bofill and his Taller de Arquitectura. He designed a series of grand neo-classical structures, enlarging classical motifs such as pediments, entablatures and pilasters to gigantic scale. The district is located between the old centre of Montpellier and the river Lez. On the opposite side of the river is the Hôtel de la Région Languedoc-Roussillon, another Bofill design. Together they make for a unified visual axis one kilometre in length, nicknamed the Champs-Élysées of Montpellier.

After Antigone, more sites on this side of Montpellier were developed.

The buildings consist mostly of low-income housing, public facilities and local shops.

The Antigone project, on a 36-hectare plot, has been one of the largest single developments completed in France and attracted worldwide interest. In 1979, the newly elected municipal council of Montpellier decided to undertake urban development and develop a new district on a site near the city centre. The purpose of this town-planning operation was to develop a new district along a central axis which would provide for the city's balanced eastward expansion and link the historical centre to the river Lez. The architect Ricardo Bofill created the master plan and most of the buildings in Antigone. From the design of the plazas to the details of the facades and exterior furniture and landscape elements, everything is proportionally and thematically related, creating a stylistic unity in a district full of boulevards and plazas, parks, major residential areas, shops, schools and sports, cultural and administrative facilities.

Antigone's projects designed by Bofill included:

- La Place du Nombre d'Or (288 apartments and shops)
- Les Echelles de la Ville (offices)
- Les Rives du Lez (landscape design of Lez riverbed)
- Headquarter of the Regional government of Languedoc-Roussillon
- Le Port Juvénal (350 apartments)
- Hotel Mercure (five-star hotel)
- Le Parnasse (100 apartments)
- Le Capitole (apartments and shops)
- La Tour Europe (offices)
- Les Guinguettes (restaurants, bars, nightclubs)
- Olympic Swimming Pool of Montpellier

== Critical reception and commentary ==
Prominent architectural historian Vincent Scully wrote of the project in 1988: "Using classical architecture to provide human scale and proportion, Antigone intends to breaks up the monotony of precast construction to generate a palace for the people. It is the classical language rethought and reconstituted in terms of the contemporary industrial technique of precast concrete construction, assembled piece by piece in a discrete order even more systematic than that sustained in the older, carved and hand-modelled way of classical building."

In an interview with architectural writer Carson Chan in 2014, Bofill said of Antigone: "I saw it as a model urban design project that could be a prototype for other places. I thought the French would take this project as a model for social housing and repeat it. I thought the world would take it as a model for housing developments. Then I realised that there could never be a model for a city or development. I think that kind of attitude toward development was my biggest mistake. There are no models for the future."

== Transport ==
Antigone is served by lines 1 and 4 of the Montpellier tramway. There are three stops: Antigone, Léon Blum and Place de l'Europe.

== Gallery ==
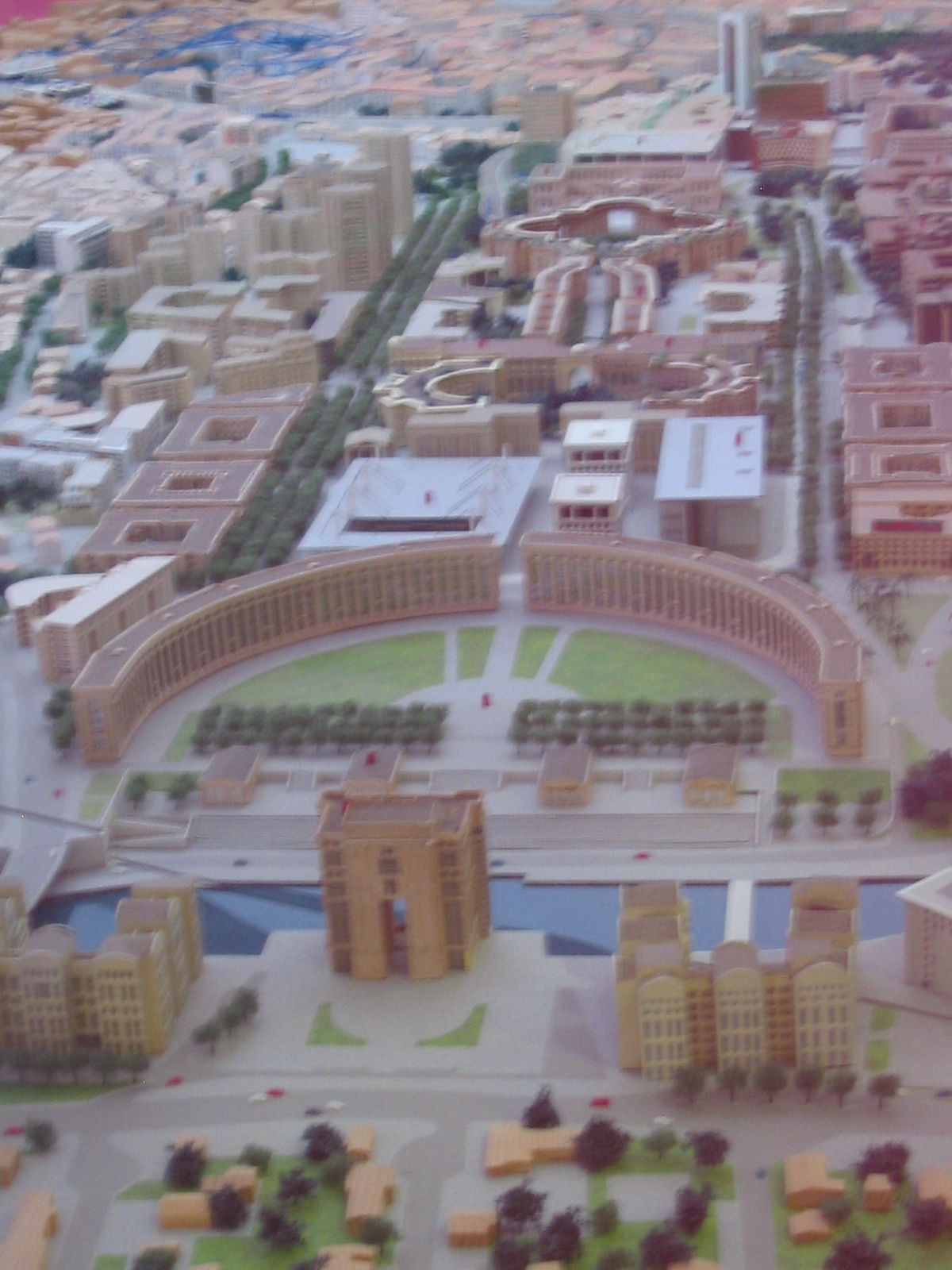
Model

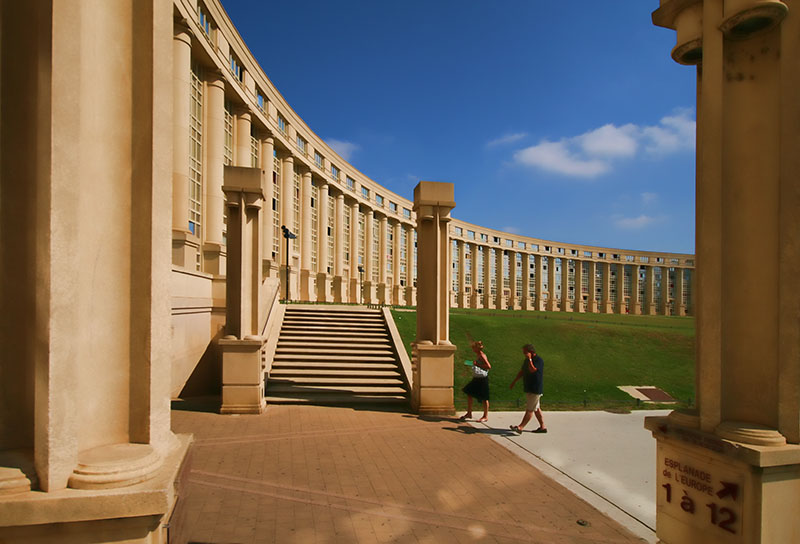
Antigone Esplanade de l'Europe north

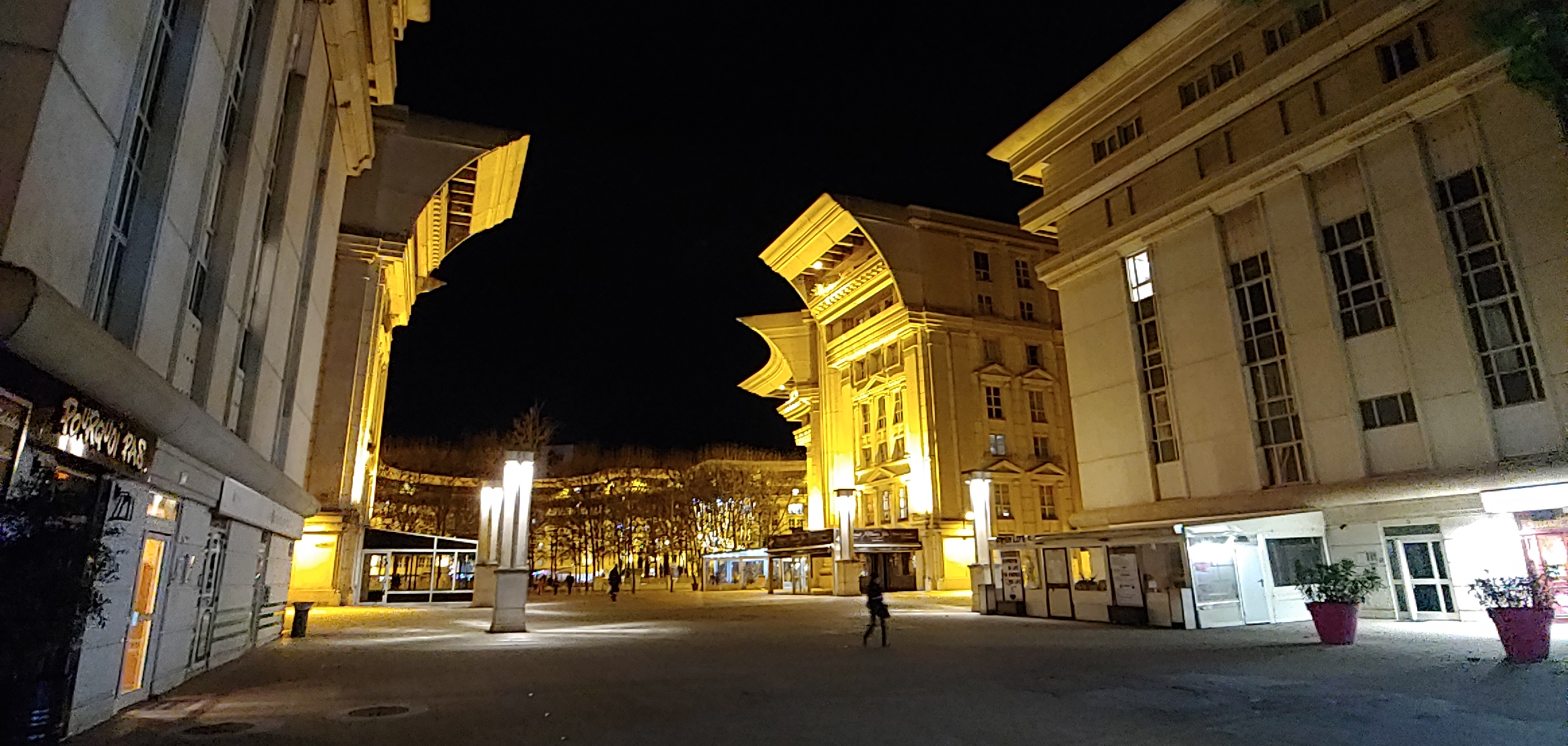
Antigone by night, Montpellier, december 2021

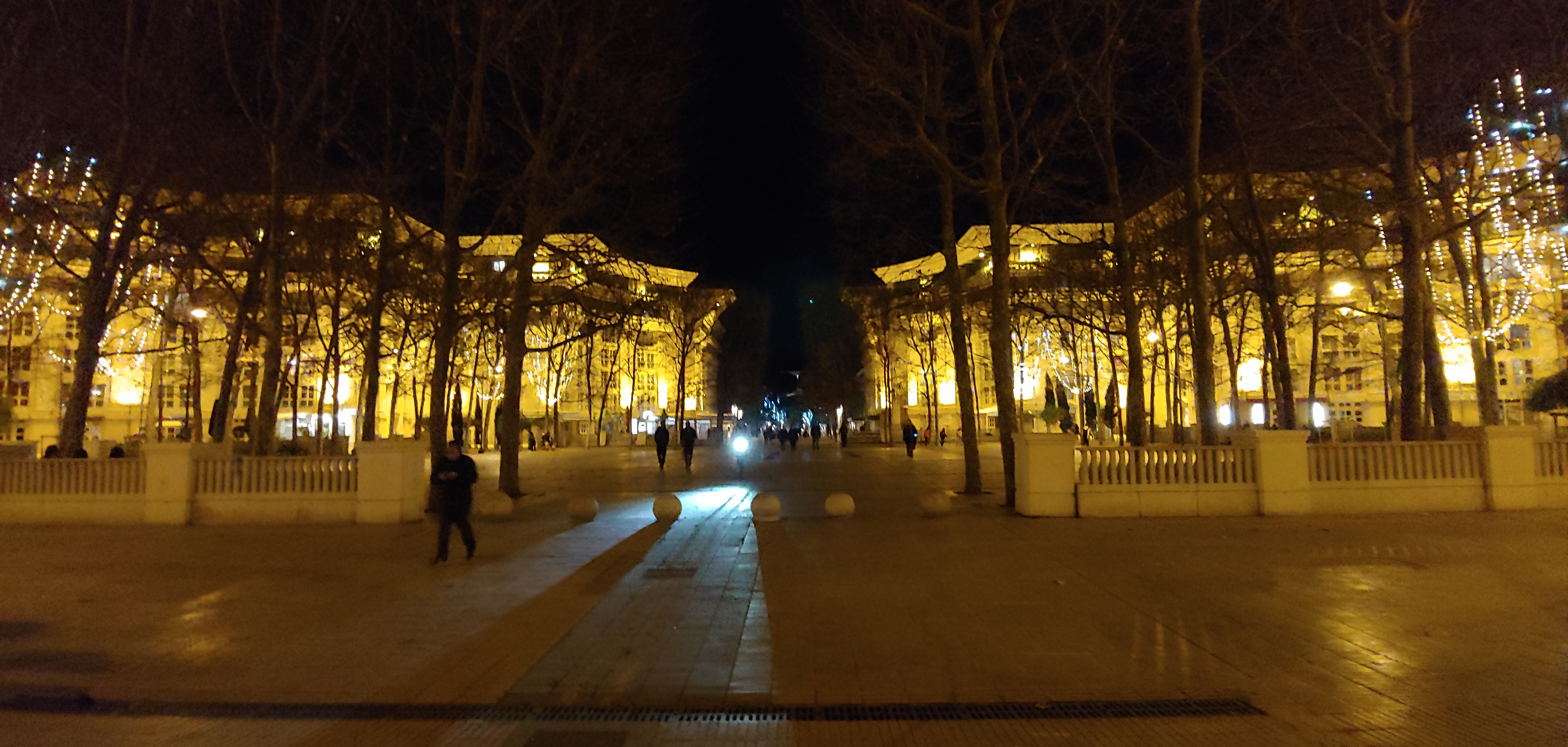
Antigone by night, Montpellier, december 2021

== See also ==
- Les Espaces d'Abraxas
- Les Arcades du Lac
- Les Echelles du Baroque
- List of works by Ricardo Bofill Taller de Arquitectura
