= Walter S. Arnold =

American artist

- Born: Chicago, Illinois
- Education: Pietrasanta, Italy
- Known for: Sculpture, Stone carving
- Website: stonecarver.com

Walter S. Arnold (born in Chicago, Illinois) is an American stone carver and sculptor best known for his gargoyles.

== Biography ==
Arnold began carving stone at the age of twelve in his hometown of Hyde Park/Kenwood, a neighborhood in Chicago, Illinois. At twenty, he began training as an apprentice in the marble studios of Pietrasanta, Italy.

Following his training under master stone carvers in Italy, Arnold spent five years from 1980-1985 working on the Washington National Cathedral in D.C., and then established his studio in Chicago in 1985. He is fluent in styles ranging from Classical and Renaissance to Gothic, Baroque and Arts & Crafts. Known especially for his gargoyles, Arnold also creates unique fireplaces, fountains, architectural carvings and sculpture for private residences, institutions and commercial buildings throughout the United States and Canada.

The Art Institute of Chicago, University of Chicago, Boston University, and the Chicago Architecture Foundation, are just a few of the nationally recognized universities, museums and organizations that have invited Arnold to present lectures on the history, technique and application of architectural and sculptural stone carving. In October 2009, he was elected to his fourth term as president of Stone Carvers Guild of America. Arnold designed and created his web site in 1994. In 2009, his book "Staglieno: The Art of the Marble Carver" was published by Edgecliff Press, LLC.

== Projects ==
National Cathedral in Washington, D.C.,(1980–1985) Frederick Hart's west front tympanum sculptural triptych, "The Creation", ninety gargoyles, grotesques, and column capitals

Harold Washington Social Security Center, Chicago, IL, Memorial Sculpture to the late Chicago Mayor, Harold Washington

Chicago Park District, IL Memorial Sculpture to the late Chicago Mayor, Harold Washington

Commonwealth Edison substation, Chicago, IL, Neoclassical tympanum

The Medici, Chicago, IL (restaurant/student hangout on 57th, near the University of Chicago) Gothic limestone façade

Lincoln Park Zoo, Chicago, IL Large relief panels for the North and South entries of the Helen Brach Primate House

(former) Chicago House of Blues Hotel lobby Four 12-foot-tall (3.7 m) Telamones sculptures

Driehaus Capital Management, Chicago, IL Massive carved Romanesque fountain

Citadel Center, Chicago, IL Winged Victory of Samothrace a.k.a. Nike, cast resin with gold leaf

Chicago Board of Trade, IL Six Art Deco relief panels for the restoration of the Chicago Board of Trade Building

== Museum exhibitions ==
One man exhibits:

- Lizzadro Museum of Lapidary Art, Elmurst, IL, 2008
- Albin Polasek Museum and Sculpture Gardens, Winter Park, FL 2007
- Art Institute of Chicago, Chicago, IL, four sculptures exhibited in 1993

Group exhibits:

- Lizzadro Museum of Lapidary Art, Oak Brook, IL 2023
- Steppenwolf Theatre Company, Chicago, IL, 1999, "Rock, Paper, Scissors: A 'battle' of works in stone, paper and metal"

== Museum collections ==
- Cambodian American Heritage Museum, Chicago, IL
- Spertus Museum, Chicago, IL
- Albin Polasek Museum and Sculpture Garden, Winter Park, FL
- Indiana State Museum, Indianapolis, IN
- Museo dei Bozzetti, Pietrasanta, Italy
- Art Institute of Chicago, Chicago, IL

== Public work ==
- Lincoln Park Zoo, Chicago, IL
- University of California, Berkeley, CA
- University of Chicago, Chicago, IL
- Loyola University, Chicago, IL
- Chicago Park District, Chicago, IL – works installed in 6 parks
- Harold Washington Social Security Center, Chicago, IL
- Somerset County Nature Preserve, NJ
- Village of Lincolnwood, IL
- St. Mary's Church in Riverside, IL
- City of Aurora, IL
- Bowdoin College, ME
- St. Helena Catholic Church, St. Helena, CA

His work in architectural restoration includes carvings for the Chicago Tribune Tower, the United States Capitol, the White House, The Field Museum of Natural History, The Chicago Board of Trade, and other historic buildings.
