= Lazona =

Lazona may refer to:

- Lazona, cultural region traditionally inhabited by the Laz people
- Lazona Kawasaki Plaza, a shopping mall in Saiwai-ku, Kawasaki, Japan
