= Xanadu (Calp) =

Iconic apartment building in Calp, Spain

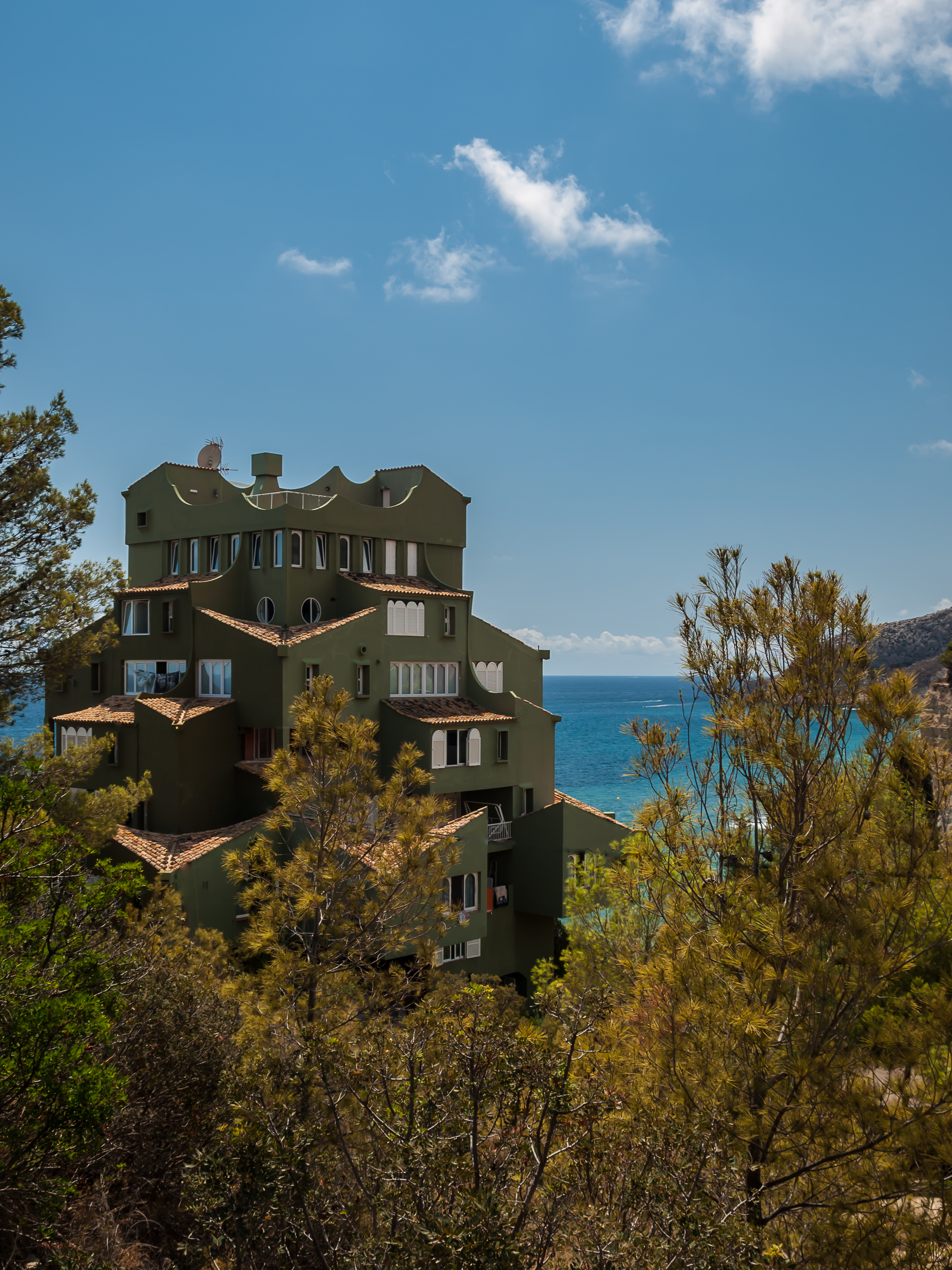
- 38°38′22″N 0°02′30″E
- Location: Calp
- Designer: Ricardo Bofill Taller de Arquitectura
- Type: Housing
- Completion date: 1971

Xanadu is a complex of 17 apartments in Calp, Spain. It was designed by Ricardo Bofill Taller de Arquitectura and completed in 1968.

The building is intended to create "a garden city in space", with its vertical shape echoing the nearby Penyal d'Ifac rock formation. It was inspired by the Utopian practice of Archigram and its "plug-in city" concept of modular megastructures.

== Location ==
The Xanadu building is located in the urbanization of Manzanera Calpe, Spain. It neighbors two other of Ricardo Bofill's structures: The Muralla Roja and the Social Club of the Manzanera. Xanadu is built over the coastal cliff of Calpe facing the Mediterranean Sea.

== Origin of Name ==
The name Xanadu references the Chinese summer city of Kublai Kan and its emperor. The history of the name is commonly interpreted to set a tone of mystery and wealth to the apartment building.

== Architectural Elements ==
This exotic structure is 2300 square meters, and is built around its core staircase. Following the vertical shape modules are attached to each level of the structure.

Due to its square modular base several gaps are created around the building. Some of these are used as terraces, however many are useless as they are not accessible from the interior.

The exterior of the building is painted a dark green color with oxidized tones to give a more organic look and associate it further with the Penyal d'Ifac or its surrounding environment.

== Tourist Attraction ==
The Xanadu building is categorized as a tourist attraction of east coast Spain. It is available to rent on a nightly basis and to walk along its exterior.

== See also ==
- La Muralla Roja
- Walden 7
- Les Espaces d'Abraxas
- List of works by Ricardo Bofill Taller de Arquitectura
