= El Castillo de Kafka =

Apartment complex in Catalonia, Spain

Coordinates: 41°15′01″N 1°47′53″E

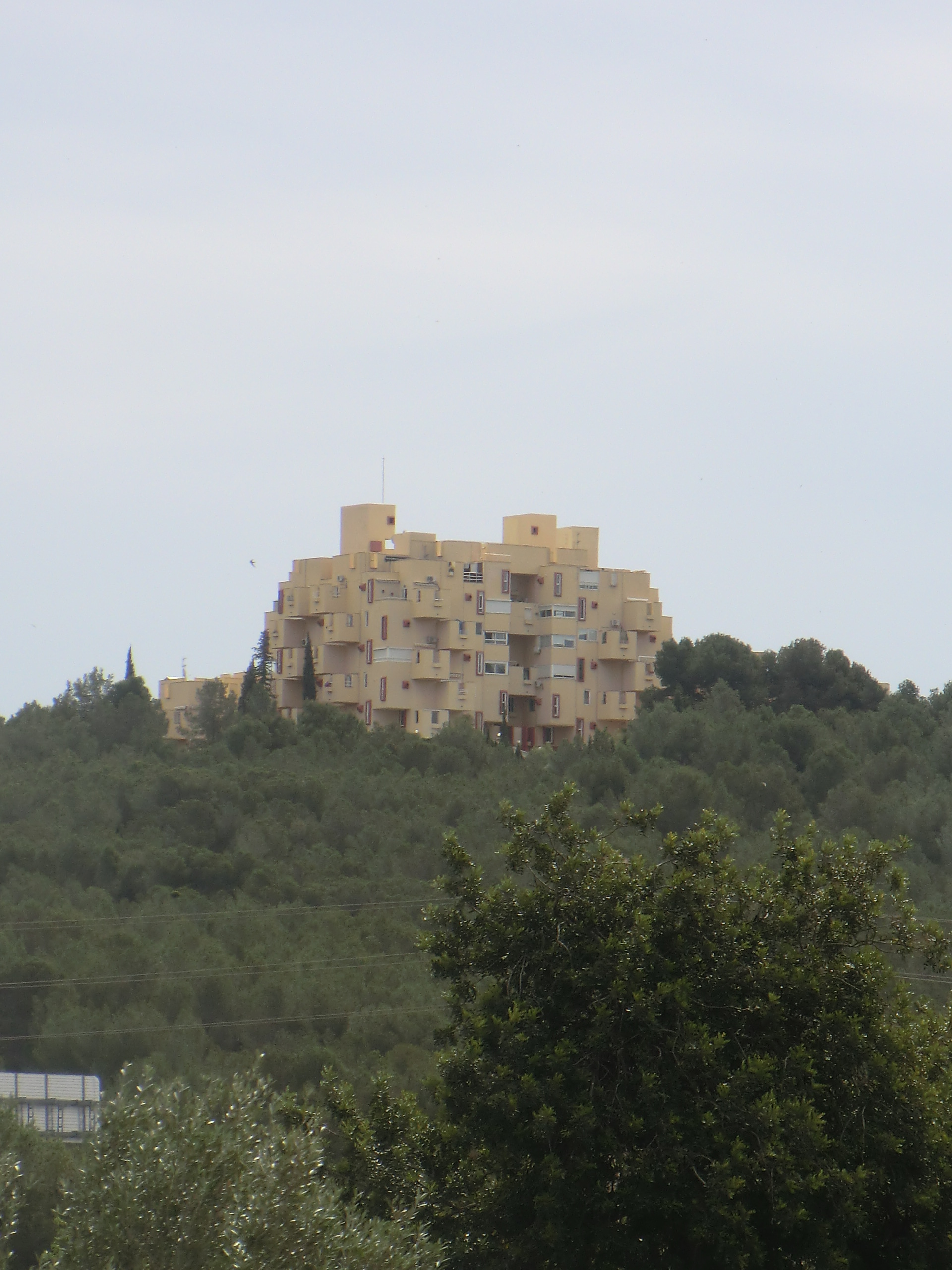
El Castillo de Kafka

El Castillo de Kafka is a complex of 90 apartments in Sant Pere de Ribes, near Sitges in Catalonia, Spain. It was designed by Ricardo Bofill Taller de Arquitectura and completed in 1968.

It was inspired by the Utopian practice of Archigram and its "plug-in city" concept of modular megastructures. Its name is an explicit reference to The Castle, the 1926 novel by Franz Kafka.

== See also ==
- La Muralla Roja
- Walden 7
- Les Espaces d'Abraxas
- List of works by Ricardo Bofill Taller de Arquitectura
