= Peter Hodgkinson =

Peter Hodgkinson may refer to:

- Peter Hodgkinson (architect) (born 1940), senior partner at Ricardo Bofill Taller de Arquitectura
- Peter Hodgkinson (sculptor) (born 1956), British sculptor
