= Luna Paiva =

Argentine artist

Luna Paiva (born 1980) is an Argentine visual artist.

== Biography and work ==
Luna Paiva was born in Paris, the daughter of photographer Rolando Paiva (1942-2003) and art dealer Teresa Anchorena. She studied art history and archaeology at Paris-Sorbonne University, Institut d'Art et d'Archéologie. She also studied cinema at New York University and theater at Cours Florent. She returned to Buenos Aires in 2003 and has since lived between Argentina and Western Europe.

Paiva received the Buenos Aires Photo Petrobras Art Prize in 2011, and the Itaú Art Prize in 2013. Her work has been exhibited in the permanent collection of the Buenos Aires Museum of Modern Art since 2012. She has also been featured in temporary exhibitions in Buenos Aires, Frankfurt, London, Madrid, Milan, New York City, Paris, São Paulo, and in the public space of Miami Beach, Florida in 2018. She has also created shop window installations for luxury brand Hermès, in Buenos Aires and Barcelona, and her jewelry has been featured in Vogue.

Paiva has had two children, Iara and Romeo, with Argentine artist Leandro Erlich. In 2021 she had a daughter, Athena Sol, with French economist Pablo Bofill, whom she married in 2022.
