= Bofills båge =

Bofills Båge
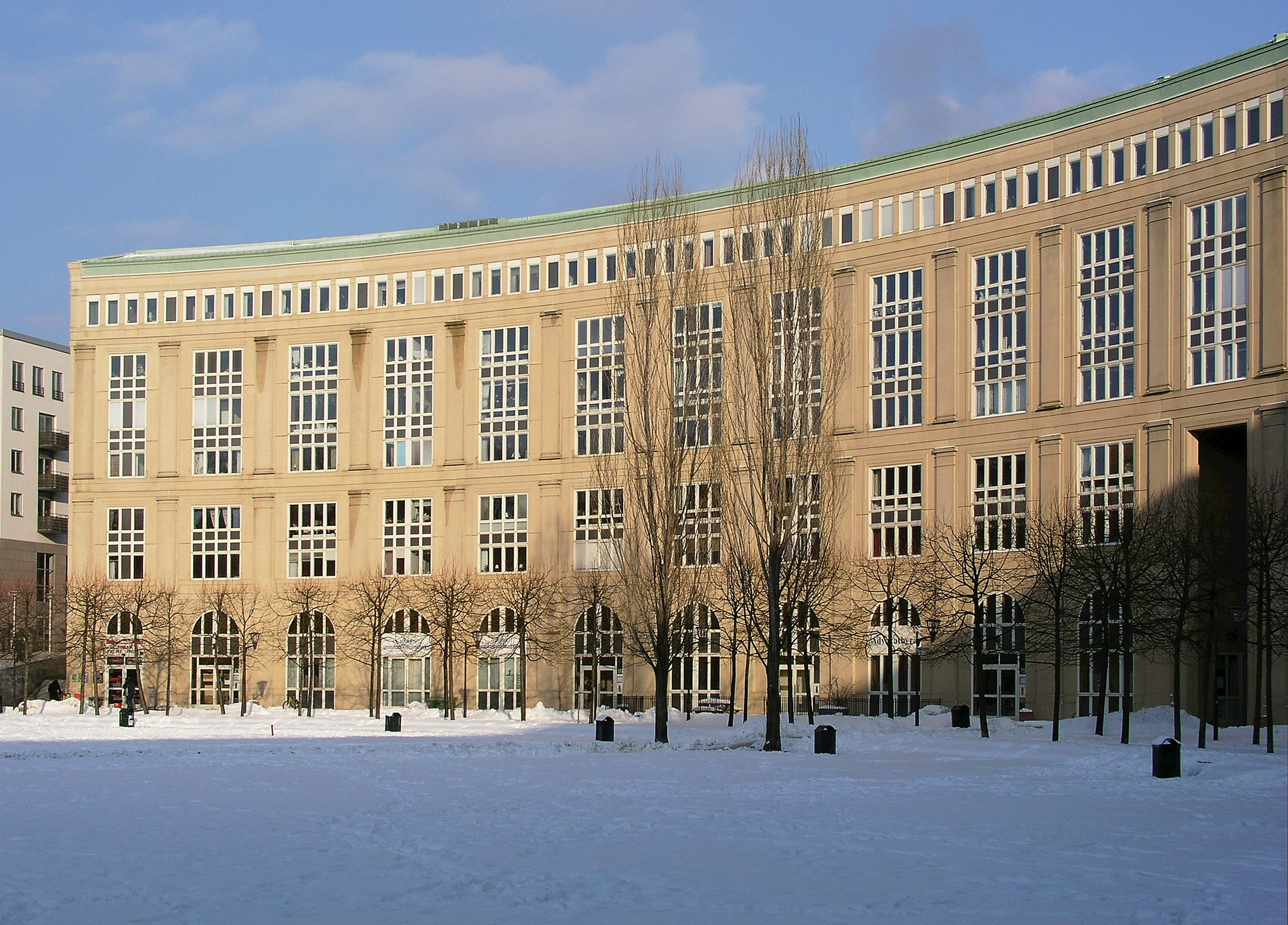
- Bofills Båge
- Interactive map of the Bofills Båge area

General information
- Type: Condominium
- Architectural style: Crescent
- Location: 118 28 Stockholm, Södermalm, Stockholm, Sweden
- Coordinates: 59°18′51″N 18°4′5″E
- Construction started: 1991
- Completed: 1992

Technical details
- Structural system: Skyscraper
- Floor area: 300 apartments, shops, offices and underground parking space

Design and construction
- Architect: Ricardo Bofill Taller de Arquitectura

Bofills Båge (Swedish: "Bofill's Crescent") is a residential building on Södermalm, Stockholm, Sweden, at 59°18′51″N 18°4′5″E. The building was designed by the Spanish architect Ricardo Bofill and constructed between 1991 and 1992.

The building complex is formed by the crescent-shaped building with a diameter of 180 metres, along with a total of five smaller apartment buildings. The complex contains about 300 apartments, shops, offices and underground parking space. It forms part of a large urban redevelopment where the old southern railyard was converted into city blocks mainly with housing developments. The Crescent is flanked by Söder Torn, a residential highrise building designed by Henning Larsen.

In the architect's words, "The crescent façade is of simple, pure lines in accordance with traditional Nordic architecture."

== See also ==
- Architecture of Stockholm
- List of works by Ricardo Bofill Taller de Arquitectura
