= Pablo Bofill =

French-Spanish architect

Pablo Bofill (born 1980 in Paris) is the CEO of the architecture firm Bofill Taller de Arquitectura in Barcelona.

== Life ==
Pablo Bofill is the son of architect Ricardo Bofill and visual artist Annabelle d'Huart. He studied at ESADE in Barcelona in the early 2000s. He became chief executive of Ricardo Bofill Taller de Arquitectura in 2009, and succeeded his late father at the firm's helm in January 2022.

In June 2014 he married Colombian designer Melissa Losada; they later divorced. He married Argentine visual artist Luna Paiva in 2022.

== See also ==
- List of works by Bofill Taller de Arquitectura
