= Manzanares Park =

Park in Spain

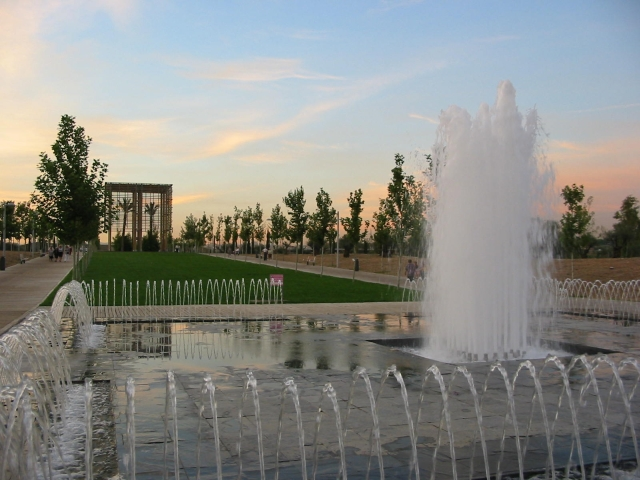
- A view of the Umbraculo

- Location within Madrid Location within Spain
- Coordinates: 40.22357°N 3.41125°W

Manzanares Park (in Spanish: Parque del Manzanares) is a large, 650 Ha. park in the south of Madrid, Spain. It follows the Manzanares River, backbone of the park, for 15 kilometres between the Casa de Campo and the town of Getafe.

The first part of the park was inaugurated on April 29, 2003. The rest of the Park is under construction.

The most significant areas of the finished part are:

- The Green Square (Plaza Verde), a wooden amphitheatre structure.
- The Alley of Senses (Paseo de los Sentidos), which goes along the river and is planted with palm trees, oak, cork, olive trees and other Mediterranean species.
- The Umbráculo.
- The Watchtower (Atalaya), a pyramid-like structure with a 13-metre-high (43 ft) sculpture by Manolo Valdés on top representing the head of a woman looking at the city.
- The Pérgola.
- The Sports Area, with several football, basketball, and handball fields.
- The Loop, a six-metre-wide (20 ft) way around the park.
- The Belvedere Park.

== Project ==
The first stage of the project "the Linear Park on the River Manzanares" by Ricardo Bofill Taller de Arquitectura was completed in 2003. The geographical location of the park, south of Madrid, is crucial to the city, which is spreading progressively towards the Meseta and needs open ground to break the urban tissue and to provide citizens with contact with nature. The ambition of the project was to transform an area containing the capital's sanitation and electricity supply infrastructures into a major park that will also meet the recreational and sporting needs of the surrounding districts. The previous studies on the treatment of the river that begun as part of Madrid's sanitation plan were followed by Bofill's design project. The park is a natural, building free setting for outdoor sports such as jogging and biking, water related activities at a large rowing canal, and open air cultural activities and events. The project foresees covering the sewer exits at the northern end of the park and isolating the water purifiers and electricity plant to hide the installations from view and mask possible emanating smells.

== See also ==
- List of works by Ricardo Bofill Taller de Arquitectura
