= Peter Hodgkinson (architect) =

British architect

Peter Hodgkinson (born 18 October 1940 in Worcester, England) is a British architect. His entire career since 1966 has been at Ricardo Bofill Taller de Arquitectura, of which he was a senior partner until 2020. Within the collective structure of the Taller under Ricardo Bofill's continued leadership, he has been a leader in the design of many iconic buildings, such as Walden 7 in Sant Just Desvern and both terminals of Josep Tarradellas Barcelona–El Prat Airport.

== Life ==
Born in England, Hodgkinson received his degree from the Architectural Association School of Architecture (AA) in London. While in London he was close to members of Team 10 and Archigram, and had experience of working with Ron Herron, one of his professors at AA.

He graduated in 1966. Peter Harden, an architect who worked at the time on models of vernacular architecture in Cadaqués, introduced him to both Ricardo Bofill and Federico Correa. He decided to move to Barcelona and join the Taller. Between 1972 and 1982, he has been a professor of projects in the fifth year of the Escuela Técnica Superior de Arquitectura de Barcelona.

== See also ==
- Ricardo Bofill
- Jean-Pierre Carniaux
- Nabil Gholam
