= Citadel Center =

Office skyscraper in Chicago, Illinois

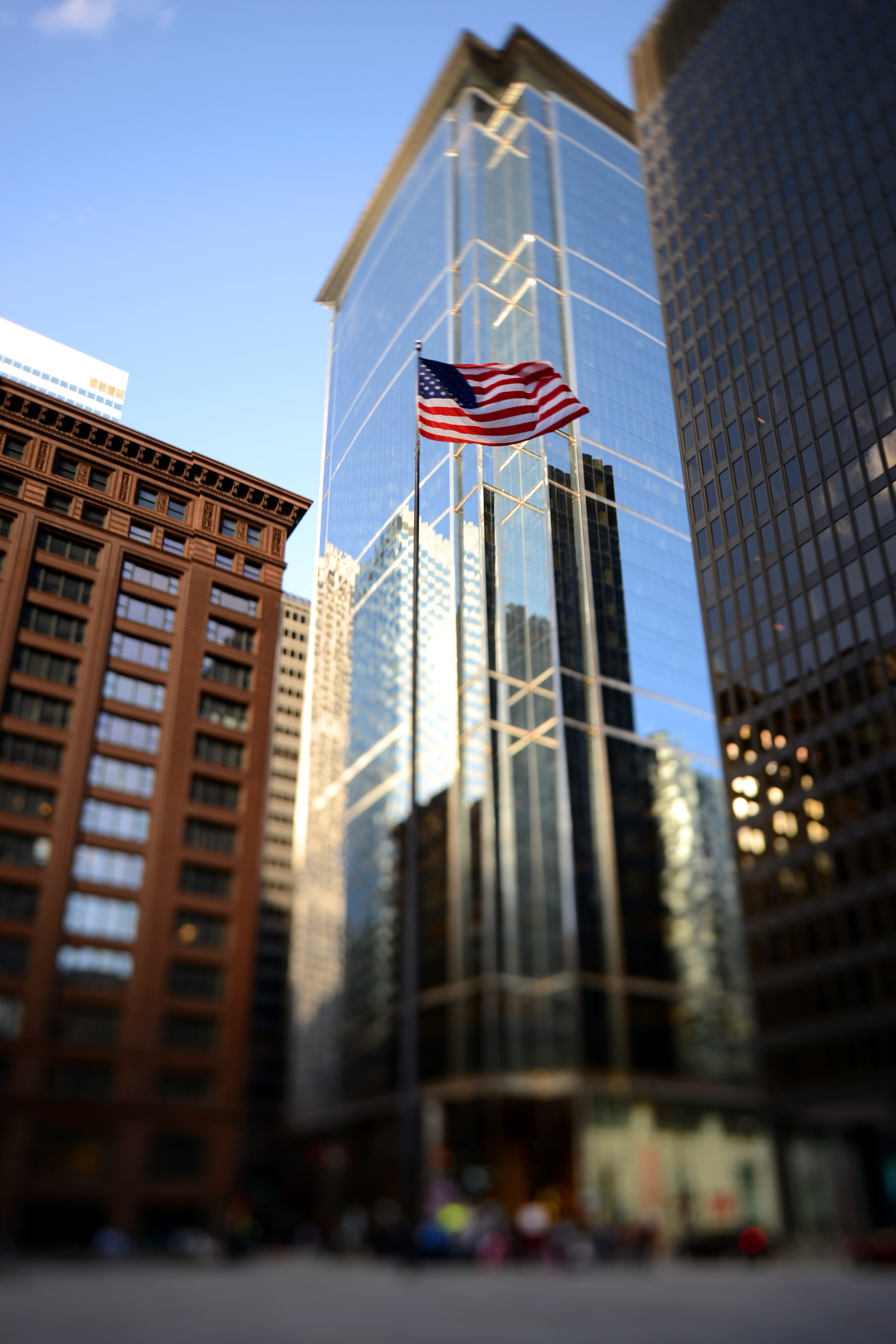
- Interactive map of the Citadel Center area

General information
- Status: Completed
- Type: Office building
- Architectural style: Postmodern
- Location: 131 S Dearborn St, Chicago, IL 60603
- Coordinates: 41°52′47″N 87°37′44″W
- Construction started: 2000
- Completed: 2003
- Owner: Dearborn Capital Group, LLC

Height
- Roof: 580 ft (180 m)

Technical details
- Floor count: 37
- Floor area: 1,536,548 sq ft (142,750 m^{2})

Design and construction
- Architect: Ricardo Bofill Taller de Arquitectura

References
- http://www.skyscrapercenter.com/building/citadel-center/2469

The Citadel Center is a 580 ft (177m) tall skyscraper in the Chicago Loop. It is located at 131 S. Dearborn St., Chicago, Illinois 60603, and was designed by Spanish architect Ricardo Bofill and his firm, Taller de Arquitectura. As of 2020, Citadel Center is the 65th tallest building in Chicago. It was completed in 2003 and has 37 above ground floors and 3 below (40 total) covering 1,536,548 sq. ft. It was certified as LEED Gold in 2017. A limited-edition cast of the Winged Victory of Samothrace, one of the world's most famous sculptures, was displayed in the lobby, and removed in late 2018. The original is on display at the Louvre Museum. The lobby previously featured a curved wall of Padauk red wood.

The Citadel Center was the first building in Chicago to use a raised-floor pressurized plenum system, allowing for more individual control of climate by the use of adjustable floor diffusers.

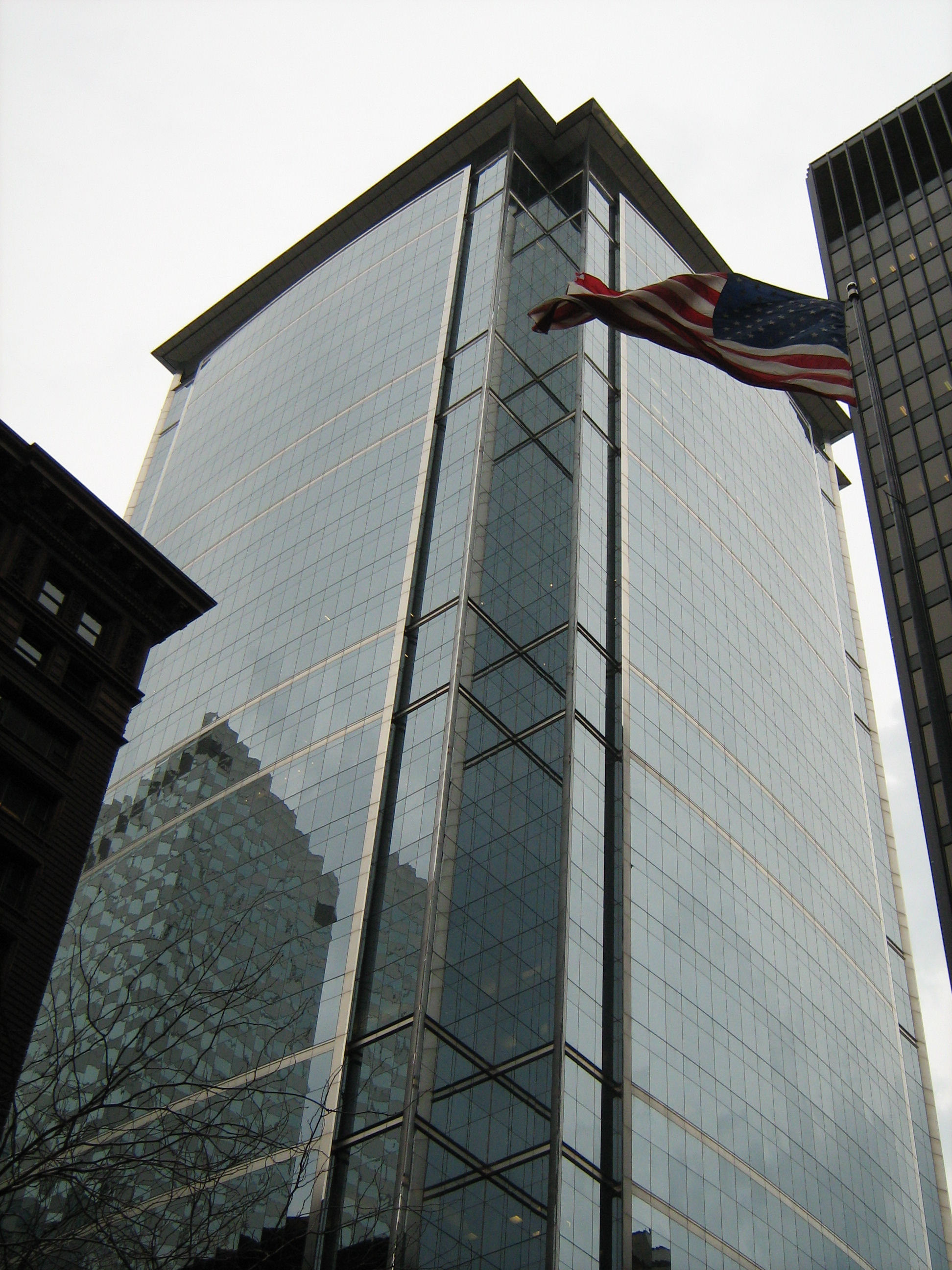
From the southwest

== 2018 Renovation ==
The building is undergoing a $100M renovation scheduled to be completed toward the end of 2018. Renovations include work in the lobby, the creation of a 182 seat conference center, as well as a 9,000 sq. ft roof deck on the 12th floor (short side of building). Tenants will also have access to a new 12th-floor amenities area, including the "Elevate Lounge," and a 10,000 sq. ft fitness center run by Midtown Athletic Club.

== Transportation ==
There is access to the CTA Red Line and CTA Blue Line immediately outside the main entrance on S. Dearborn Street which provides direct access to O'Hare International Airport. The building's garage has about 215 spaces. There is a bike storage room, and bi-directional bike lanes run north–south to the building's west on Dearborn Street. Numerous CTA lines and buses are also proximal.

== Site In Chicago ==
The Citadel Center sits on a site occupied originally by The Fair Store, an early high-rise designed by William LeBaron Jenney in 1892 that was demolished in 1985.

== Tenants ==
- Citadel
- Holland & Knight
- Perkins Coie
- JPMorgan Chase
- Sprout Social (Spanish)
- Food.Partners I Co-op.Partners

== Retail Tenants ==
- Starbucks Coffee
- AKIRA Chicago
- Hannah's Bretzel

== See also ==
- List of tallest buildings in Chicago
- List of works by Ricardo Bofill Taller de Arquitectura
