= Shepherd School of Music =

Music school of Rice University

Coordinates: 29.7164°N 95.4049°W

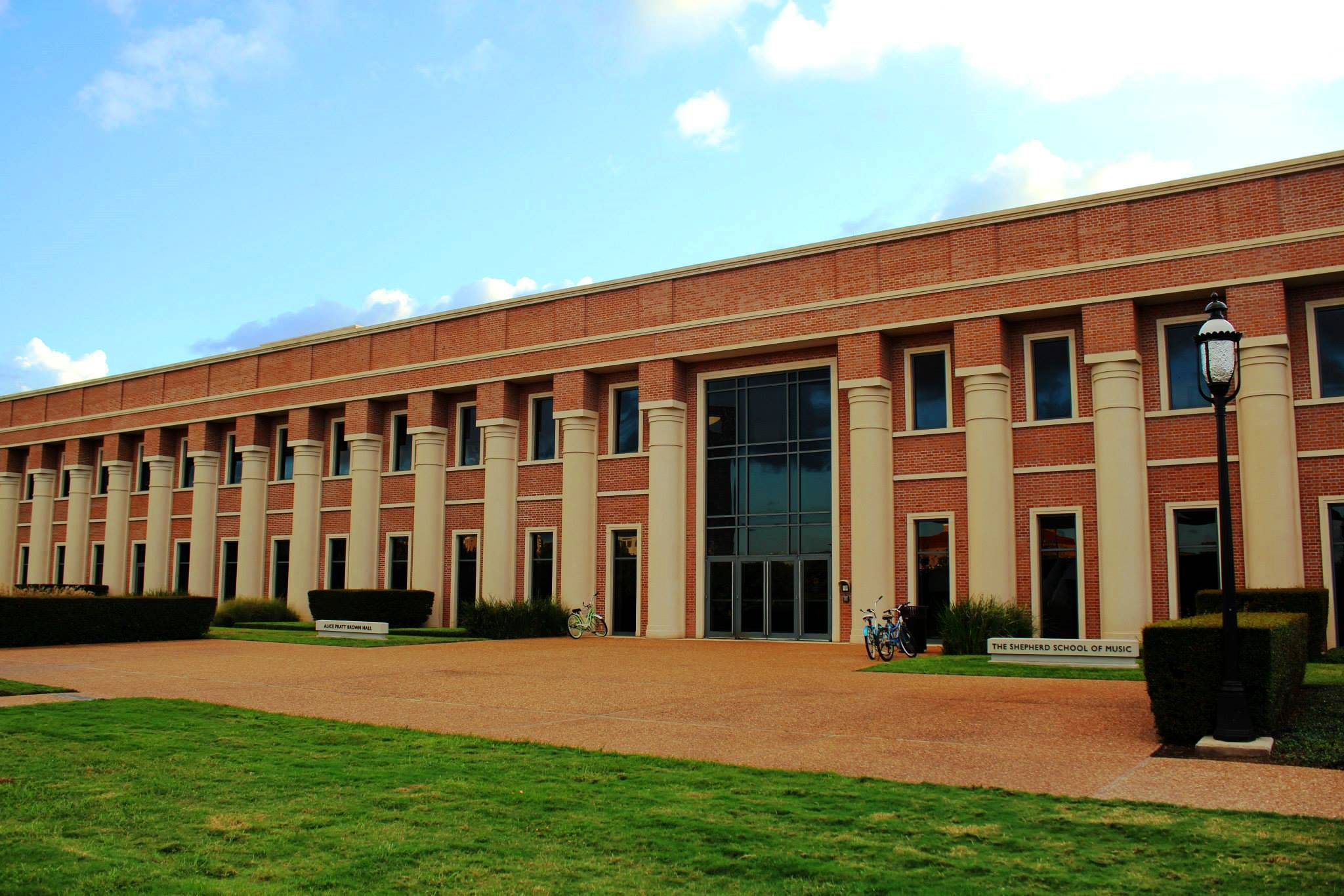
- Type: Private
- Established: 1974
- Dean: Matthew Loden
- Faculty: 64
- Undergraduates: 100
- Postgraduates: 175
- Location: Houston, Texas, U.S.
- Website: music.rice.edu
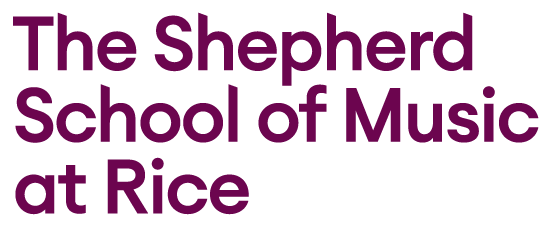

The Shepherd School of Music is a music school located on the campus of Rice University in Houston, Texas, United States. From its inception in 1974 under dean Samuel Jones, the Shepherd School has emphasized orchestral, chamber music, and opera as the central elements of its performing curriculum. The Shepherd School offers comprehensive musical education programs, including Bachelor of Music (BMus), Master of Music (MMus), Doctor of Musical Arts (DMA), and Artist Diploma degrees.

== History ==
The Shepherd School has existed in name since 1950, with an $8 million endowment by Sallie Shepherd Perkins in honor of her grandfather, Houston banker Benjamin A. Shepherd. It was opened in 1974 under the deanship of conductor and composer Samuel Jones. The school's building, Alice Pratt Brown Hall, was dedicated on October 4, 1991. Prior to its existence, concerts were given in Hamman Hall, Cohen House, Fondren Library’s Kyle Morrow Room, Rice Memorial Chapel, Milford House, and various churches in Houston.

Shepherd School alumni include Grammy Award and Pulitzer Prize winners and hold positions in prestigious orchestras including the Cleveland Orchestra, the Philadelphia Orchestra, the Boston Symphony Orchestra, the Chicago Symphony Orchestra, the National Symphony Orchestra, the Metropolitan Opera Orchestra, and the Los Angeles Philharmonic.

== Academics ==
Shepherd students participate in a program that allows for individual study at both the undergraduate and graduate levels. Courses are taught exclusively by faculty, with classes averaging fewer than thirty students. A small number of courses are offered to Rice University students as a whole (without special admission requirements), including Fundamentals of Music, Music Theory for Non-Music Majors I and II, and Music Literature for Non-Music Majors I and II.

Admission to the Shepherd School is competitive. Shepherd accepts about 10-15% of graduate applicants and 15% of all undergraduate applicants.

In 2025, the school announced that New York Metropolitan Opera Orchestra concertmaster David Chan would join the faculty as full-time professor of violin.

== Concerts ==
Each year more than 400 free concerts and recitals are given by students, faculty, and visiting artists and attract about 70,000 concert-goers annually. Numerous world-renowned classical musicians have come to the Shepherd School to give concerts and conduct master classes, including Yo-Yo Ma, André Watts, Itzhak Perlman, Cecilia Bartoli, and Renée Fleming.

== Facilities ==
The school's home, Alice Pratt Brown Hall houses the 1,000-seat Stude Concert Hall, the 250-seat Duncan Recital Hall, the Edythe Bates Old Grand Organ and Recital Hall, an opera studio, 65 practice rooms, seven classrooms, rehearsal and small ensemble spaces and 54 teaching studios. Situated on the western side of the Rice campus, it is made up of two long parallel wings joined by gardens and connecting corridors of loggias. The building was designed by the Spanish architect Ricardo Bofill and completed in 1991.

In September 2017, the Shepherd School broke ground on a new opera and music building, to be connected to Alice Pratt Brown Hall by a plaza. The Brockman Music and Performing Arts Center was completed in 2022 and features a newly constructed theater building.

== Preparatory program ==
The Michael P. Hammond Preparatory Program of the Shepherd School of Music at Rice University offers non-credit private instruction in piano and selected string (violin and cello) instruments for children ages 6–18. Pre-school classes for very young children begin as early as age two through the Young Children's Division. Chamber music groups, group theory instruction, and classes for the young child are also available.

== See also ==
- List of works by Ricardo Bofill Taller de Arquitectura
