= List of works by Bofill Taller de Arquitectura =

Bofill Taller de Arquitectura is an architecture firm based in Barcelona. Completed buildings are listed in chronological order of completion, and unbuilt projects or urban master plans by date of design.

== 1960s ==
- Apartment Building, Calle Compositor Bach 28, Barcelona (completed 1963)
- Two Apartment Buildings, Calle compositor Bach 4 and Calle Maestro P. Cabrer 6, Barcelona (completed 1965): 8-story building (3,348 m2)
- Apartment Building, Calle Nicaragua 99, Barcelona (completed 1965): 8-story corner building (2,300 m2); won the FAD Architecture Award in 1964.
- Club Mas Pey, Sant Feliu de Guixols, Catalonia/Spain (completed 1966): Sports Club with facilities situated within a designed landscape near the sea.
- El Castillo de Kafka, Sant Pere de Ribes, Catalonia/Spain (completed 1968): Holiday apartments.

== 1970s ==
Sanctuary of Our Lady of Meritxell, Andorra

- Gaudí District, Reus, Catalonia/Spain (completed 1970): 600 apartment public housing complex with public facilities such as schools and retail.
- Xanadu, La Manzanera Resort in Calp, Spain (completed 1971): Residential complex of 18 apartments.
- La Muralla Roja, La Manzanera Resort in Calp, Spain (completed 1973): Residential complex of 50 apartments.
- Bofill family house, Mont-ras, Costa Brava (completed 1973)
- Walden 7, Sant Just Desvern, Barcelona (completed 1974): Residential complex of 446 apartment units, offices, parking facilities and a shopping area.
- La Fábrica, Sant Just Desvern, Barcelona (completed 1975): Renovation of an old cement factory into headquarters of Bofill Taller de Arquitectura and residence of Ricardo Bofill.
- Les Halles, Paris (1975 Competition): Urban space in the center of Paris with garden, private housing units and public facilities. The first phase (housing) began in 1978, then was stopped by the Mayor of Paris and eventually demolished in 1979.
- Le Perthus Pyramid, Le Perthus, Spanish-French border (completed 1976): Monumental sculpture.
- Sanctuary of Our Lady of Meritxell, Andorra (completed 1977): Religious complex consisting on a sanctuary, meeting rooms and apartments for clergy.
- Antigone, Montpellier (1979 master plan): Urban development plan on a plot of 36 hectares, on a 2 km-long axis towards the river Lez.

== 1980s ==
- Houari Boumedienne Agricultural Village, Algeria (completed 1980): 350 apartment units, a market and a mosque.
- The Presence of the Past, Venice (1980) architectural facade in the Venice Biennale architectural exhibition (1980)
- Les Arcades du Lac, Saint-Quentin-en-Yvelines near Paris (completed 1982): Social housing complex with 600 apartment units, public and private facilities.
- El Anfiteatro, La Manzanera Resort in Calp, Spain (completed 1982): Residential complex.
- Les Espaces d'Abraxas, Marne-la-Vallée near Paris (completed 1982): Social housing complex of 591 low cost apartments consisting of three buildings: "Le Palacio", "Le Théatre" and "L'Arc" set in a public garden space.
- La Place du Nombre d'Or, Montpellier (completed 1984): 288 apartment complex and retail around a public plaza, at the start of new urban axis of Antigone quarter.
- Les Échelles du Baroque, Paris (completed 1985): 272 apartments and shops. The two buildings are set around three plazas, one circular, one elliptical and the other in the form of an amphitheater.
- Le Belvédère Saint-Christophe, Cergy-Pontoise near Paris (completed 1985): 380 apartment complex with shops and a public garden around three plazas, at the top of Axe majeur monumental axis.
- Château Lafite Rothschild, Pauillac, France (completed 1986): Wine cellars.
- Les Temples Du Lac, Saint-Quentin-en-Yvelines (completed 1986): 200 apartment complex and gardens facing the earlier projects «Les Arcades du Lac» and «Le Viaduc».
- Aïguera Park, Benidorm, Spain (completed 1987): Park in city center, including public facilities, parking facilities and a system of traffic connections.
- Rochas, Paris (completed 1987): New façade of the headquarters building of Societé de Parfums Rochas.
- Les Echelles De La Ville, Montpellier (completed 1987): Office building in Antigone, to link the old city center and the new Antigone district.
- Regional Government Headquarters, Montpellier (completed 1988): Regional government administrative center at the end of Antigone.
- Jardín del Turia, Valencia (completed 1988): Design of a garden in the dry riverbed of the Turia River (ca. 8 km x 200m) in the city center of Valencia.
- Port Juvenal, Montpellier (completed 1989): Housing complex (350 apartments) in Antigone district.
- Arsenal Music Center, Metz, France (completed 1989): Music center, including auditorium for the Lorraine Philharmonic Orchestra.
- SWIFT Headquarters, La Hulpe near Brussels (completed 1989): New headquarters building of an international financial market infrastructure company.

== 1990s ==
- Institut Nacional d'Educació Física de Catalunya, Barcelona (completed 1991): Training center for physical education teachers which forms part of the "Olympic ring" on Montjuïc Hill.
- Ricardo Bofill Taller de Arquitectura French Office, Paris (completed 1991): Renovation of the former printing offices of Le Petit Parisien, originally Teatre de l'Escalier d'Or, and conversion into office space.
- L'Aire Des Volcans near Clermont-Ferrand, France (completed 1991): Landscaped parking area of the French Highway A71, on a 30 ha site; gas station, restaurant, hotel, and exhibition center displaying regional products.
- JCDecaux, Neuilly-sur-Seine near Paris (completed 1991): 5,000-m² office headquarters building for the Decaux company.
- Shepherd School of Music, Houston (completed 1991): Music Instruction and Performance Building for Rice University for 300 staff and students, including a concert hall for 1,200 people, rehearsal halls, classrooms, practice rooms and offices.
- 77 West Wacker Drive, Chicago (completed 1992): iconic 50-story office tower facing the Chicago river.
- Extension of Josep Tarradellas Barcelona–El Prat Airport (completed 1992): New terminal for Barcelona's international airport and expansion of the existing terminals.
- På Söder Crescent, Stockholm (completed 1992): 400 unit housing complex and public facilities in the city center. The arc-shaped main building is known to Stockholm inhabitants as "Bofills båge" (Bofill's crescent).
- Groupe des Assurances Nationales, Paris (completed 1992): Office building of 6,000 m2 for an insurance company
- Christian Dior, Paris (completed 1992): Remodeling of headquarters building for office use with new façade.
- Mercure Hotel, Montpellier (completed 1992): 100-room hotel at the entrance of the Antigone neighborhood.
- United Arrows, Tokyo (completed 1992): Shopping gallery located in the district of Shibuya.
- Madrid Congress Center (completed 1993): Congress palace and convention center with two auditoriums for 2,000 and 900 seats plus lecture halls, exhibition space, bars, restaurants, retail, offices and general ancillary areas.
- Hubber Office Building, Calle Berlin, Barcelona (completed 1993): 19,000 square meters with commercial area.
- Hotel Costes K. (originally Kléber Palace), Paris (completed 1993): Luxury hotel with 85 bedrooms and 7 levels of underground parking.
- Stefanel (1994): Six fashion retail spaces for the chain Stefanel, in Rome, Milan, Turin, Bologna and Rimini.
- Fnac, Barcelona (completed 1996): Retail space inside the L'Illa Diagonal shopping mall on Avinguda Diagonal.
- Gornal, L'Hospitalet de Llobregat near Barcelona (completed 1997): Housing complex with 176 apartments in two 13th-floor towers and one 6th-floor lineal building.
- Teatre Nacional de Catalunya, Barcelona (completed 1997): Repertory theatre (1,000 seats), experimental theatre (400 seats), open-air theatre (400 seats), theatre school, rehearsal rooms, a bar and a stage set workshop.
- Place du Marché-Saint-Honoré, Paris (completed 1997): Office complex for BNP Paribas, crossed by a commercial passage in the center of Paris.
- Aoyama Palace, Tokyo (completed 1998): Housing, offices and commercial facilities in Omotesandō district.
- Casablanca Twin Center, Casablanca, Morocco (completed 1998): 77.000 sqm World Trade Centre, two 115-m high towers accommodating offices, apartments and retail area.
- Kirchberg, Luxembourg (1998): Large-scale restructuring of the administrative district and European Union institutions.
- Place de l'Europe, Luxembourg (1998): Urban design of a new public space on Kirchberg, with a housing complex, an auditorium and a book center.
- Atrium Saldanha, Lisbon (completed 1998): Mixed-use office and retail building which includes a shopping center, bars, restaurants, underground parking.
- Axa, Paris (completed 1999): Corporate headquarters, renovation of an 18th-century building and 6,550 m² extension.
- Olympic Swimming Pool, Montpellier (completed 1999): Sport facilities complex in Antigone, which includes an Olympic pool, a leisure pool, a fitness club, a solarium, two restaurants and shops.
- 180 North Lasalle, Chicago (completed 1999): Renovation of an existing building's façade and lobby.
- Weidert Housing Complex, Luxembourg (completed 1999): Luxury residential housing in the city center.
- Karlín Palace, Prague (completed 1999): Renovation of an old industrial building into an office building.

== 2000s ==
- Extension of Málaga Airport (completed 2000): New processor and hall to link with the existing building, communication element with future intermodal station and satellite for a planned second runway.
- Corso Karlín, Prague (completed 2000): Renovation of an old industrial building into an office building.
- Shiseido, Tokyo (completed 2001): Representative building in Ginza district, including a shop, a show room, an art gallery, bars and restaurants and offices.
- Cartier, Paris (completed 2002): Office complex and public space in high-end Saint-Honoré neighborhood.
- Zona Franca Business Park, Zona Franca, Barcelona (completed 2002): Complex of office buildings of heights varying between three and five floors.
- Nexus II, Barcelona (completed 2002): 4-story office building on the campus of the Polytechnic University of Catalonia, for private firms linked to the university.
- Maritime Front Block, Barcelona (completed 2002): Housing complex (250 apartments) with retail space in the area of Diagonal Mar i el Front Marítim del Poblenou.
- Further extension of Josep Tarradellas Barcelona–El Prat Airport (completed 2003): "Module 5" extension of Barcelona Airport Terminal, with a large boarding hall and 6 "finger" extensions for international flights
- Palacrociere cruise terminal, Savona, Italy (completed 2003): New maritime station in Savona's harbor.
- Citadel Center, Chicago (completed 2003): Office building including a 37 story high-rise portion, and an 11-story low-rise portion.
- Manzanares Park, Madrid (completed 2003): Rehabilitation of a section of the Manzanares river, which includes a recreation park, sport facilities and an open auditorium for 30,000 people.
- Burgemeester De Monchyplein, The Hague (completed 2004): Urban restructuring of neighbourhood in the city centre, with a housing complex and green public spaces.
- Shangri-la Hotel, Beijing (completed 2004): twin tower complex with a 5 star hotel.
- La Porte, Luxembourg (completed 2005): Tour A and Tour B, two 18-story (68m) office towers on Place de l'Europe, Plateau Kirchberg.
- Convention & Exhibition Center, A Coruña, Spain (completed 2005): Seafront exhibition venue.
- Lazona Kawasaki Plaza, Kawasaki (completed 2006): Shopping centre articulated around a semicircular plaza; 4 storeys high building contains retail stores, boutiques, restaurants and cinemas.
- Miguel Delibes Cultural Center, Valladolid, Spain (completed 2007): A cultural facility accommodating a Symphonic music concert hall, the headquarters of the local symphony orchestra, a chamber music concert hall, conservatoire, experimental theatre and the Valladolid school of the dramatic arts.
- Funchal Centrum, Funchal, Madeira (completed 2007): Urban development and refurbishing of formerly industrial area.
- Apartment Tower, Savona (completed 2007): Urban development of the Savona Port including a residential complex, an office building and retail.
- The Reflections, Beijing (completed 2007): Luxury residential complex located south of Yuyuantan Lake.
- Alexandria, Saint Petersburg (completed 2007): 53,000 complex in the neighborhood of Smolny Convent.
- Colombo's Resort, Porto Santo Island, Madeira (completed 2008): Residential and leisure resort in the seashore.
- Supershine Upper East Side, Beijing (completed 2008): Development of plots C5-C8 of Beijing Sunshine Upper East Side International Community (residential and retail).
- Corso II, Prague (completed 2008): Office Building (13,000 m2)
- Platinum Tower, Beirut (with Nabil Gholam, completed 2008): 120-meters high, 33-storey building, located in Beirut's marina which contents luxury apartments and underground car park on four floors.
- W Barcelona Hotel (completed 2009): Office building and seaside 5-star hotel.

== 2010s ==
- Résidence de la Paix, Dakar (completed 2010): 60,000 sqm residential project.
- Signature Tower III, Gurgaon, India (2010): High-end office 54117 sqm, consisting of 2/3 towers of a floor plate of 1800-2000 sqm. terrace.
- Terminal 1 of Josep Tarradellas Barcelona–El Prat Airport (2010): South terminal at Barcelona Airport.
- EMINES School of Industrial Management, Ben Guerir, Morocco (completed 2011): 31,000 sqm educational facility, first phase of Polytechnic University campus.
- Desigual, Barcelona (2013): New headquarters for the global fashion company, on Barcelona's beach front next to the W Barcelona Hotel.
- Karlín Event Hall, Prague (completed 2013): Renovation of an old industrial building into an office building.
- Tomorrow Plaza, Shenyang (completed 2013): Mixed-use complex which includes a transportation center, a retail hub, apartments, public facilities such as sports club, health and spa, restaurants, office space.
- Médiathèque L'Ourse public library, Dinard, France (completed 2013): Public library on three floors.
- University Mohammed VI Polytechnic, Ben Guerir, Morocco (completed 2016): University Building, OCP building, hotel, conference hall, student residence, sports and medical center, R&D laboratories related to OCP activities (mining and processing phosphates), car park and green areas.

== 2020s ==
- Crescent (Salerno) (completed 2021): seafront plaza and crescent-shaped building.
