= La Muralla Roja =

Apartment complex in Alicante Province, Spain

Coordinates: 38.63934°N 0.04057°E

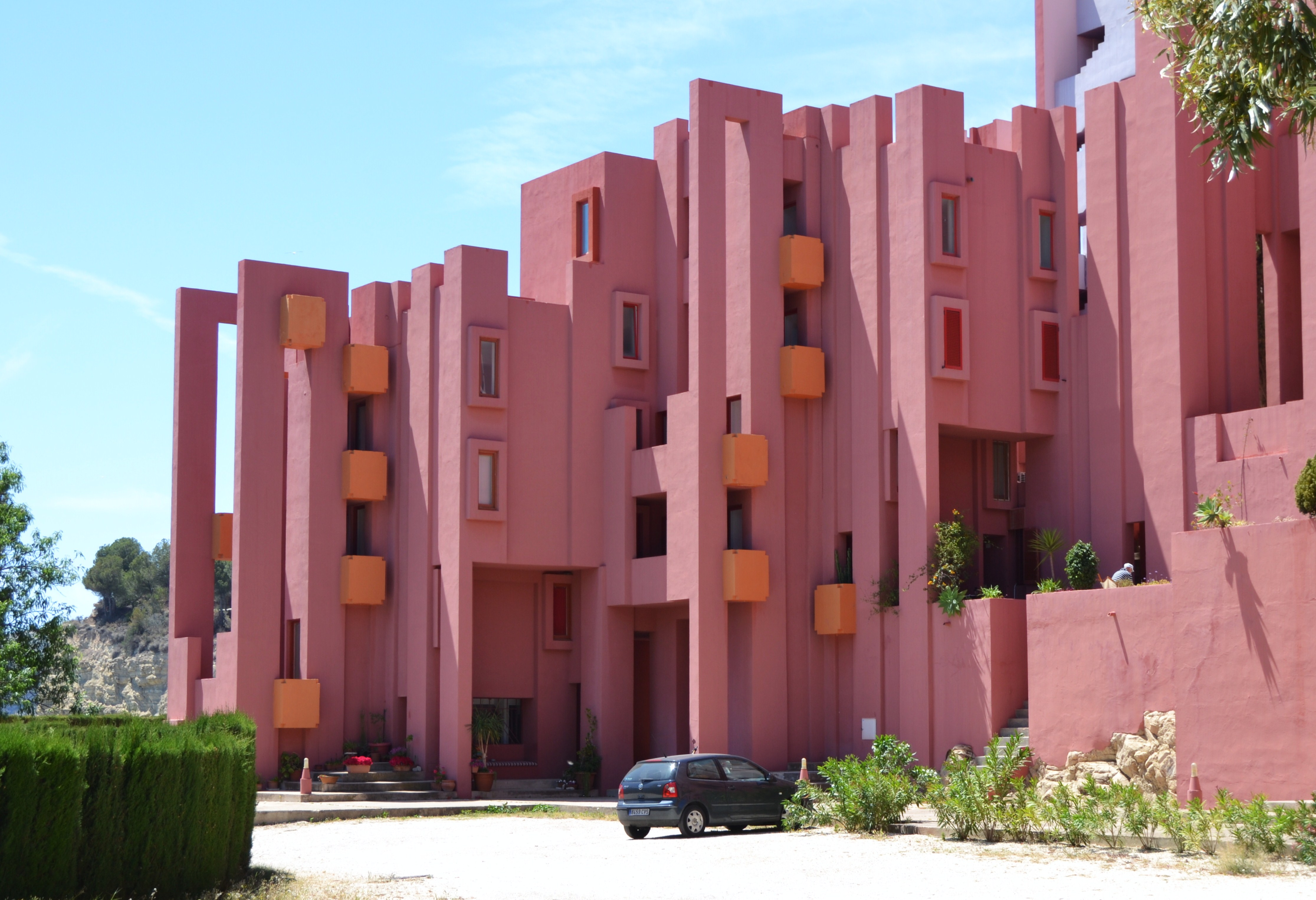
- Interactive map of the La Muralla Roja area

General information
- Architectural style: Postmodern architecture
- Location: Partida Manzanera, 3, 03710 Calpe, Alicante, Spain

Design and construction
- Architect: Ricardo Bofill

La Muralla Roja (lit. 'the Red Wall') is a postmodern apartment complex in Manzanera, Calpe, Spain. It is designed by Spanish architect Ricardo Bofill for the client Palomar S.A. in 1968 and fully constructed by 1973. It has been ranked among "Ricardo Bofill's 10 Most Iconic Works".

In designing the building, Bofill referenced the architecture of North African casbahs and Arab Mediterranean architectural styles. It reinterprets the casbahs in an avant-garde fashion while incorporating the traditional elements like plazas (courtyards), staircases and bridges that connect all the apartments to one another.

As a residency, it holds several amenities such as two commercial stores, a sauna and a restaurant all on the first level. On roof terraces there are solariums and a swimming pool exclusively for use of its residents.

La Muralla Roja is referred to as a housing estate that has fifty apartments/ living spaces. There are three different styles and sizes of apartments: Studio apartments of approximately 60 square meters, two bedroom apartments of 80 square meters, and three bedroom apartments of approximately 120 square meters.

== Design ==
The apartment complex is constructed based on the geometric figure of the greek cross with approximately 5 meter arms. It has exactly 13 of these crosses imbedded into its design. Apartments interiors are formatted to have kitchens and bathrooms at the intersections of the cross structures.

The entire complex is based on five connected plants. Three of these follow the same structure of being four levels, with each level being different from the other. The first level is composed of a four plan module composed into an L shape that is 64 square meters. Despite the interior model being L-shaped, the courtyards and patios are what in the end give it the resulting shape of a cross. The second level consists of five module apartments that are 80 square meters. The third floor is a replica of the first floor with the exception of it being rotated 180 degrees. The last floor of 78.90 square meters only consists of a single apartment, replicating those of the second floor.

The other two plants are only three floors and follow a similar pattern to first and third floors of the other three plants, in that they are composed of L-shaped apartments. Its staggered and compartmental structure suggests a brutalist architectural style.

The interior and exterior courtyards/ patios found throughout the complex function as a connection between the apartments of neighbors.They also become an architectural technique to allow natural light into each apartment.

It is often considered to be simplistic on design but the use of color on the exterior of the buildings is what gives an illusion of space. The vibrant walls are painted with different tones of the colors red, pink, blue and violet. Blue is used on central courtyards, pink for subsidiary courtyards, and everything else like staircases, bridges, and retaining walls are painted violet.

It is a common interpretation that the red and pink tones of La Muralla Roja are used to present a contrast against or an emphasis on the landscape with the earthy colors of red and pink. Similarly the blue tones are used against the hues of the sky and/or water. This consideration of environment is a common attribute of Ricardo Bofill’s work and is especially present in his other architectural designs such as the Social Club of Manzanera and Xanadu building.

=== Material ===
Each section of the apartment complex is constructed through a modular frame using cement as primary construction material.

== Tourist Attraction ==
La Muralla Roja is categorized as a tourist attraction of east coast Spain. Apartments can be rented on a nightly basis or bought, however it maintains its status as an apartment complex. Unfortunately, at present it is not possible to go inside because it has become a private area.

== In Media ==
The music video for Martin Solveig's song "Do It Right" was filmed at the building and surrounding locations. The Intro of the German TV Show Wer stiehlt mir die Show?, translated: Who is Stealing the Show from Me?, Hosted by Joko Winterscheidt, was filmed in La Muralla Roja. The set design in the Korean Netflix television series Squid Game was inspired by the building's architecture.

== See also ==
- El Castillo de Kafka
- Walden 7
- Les Espaces d'Abraxas
- List of works by Ricardo Bofill Taller de Arquitectura
- Xanadu (Calp)
