= Les Arcades du Lac =

Coordinates: 48.767648°N 2.044338°E

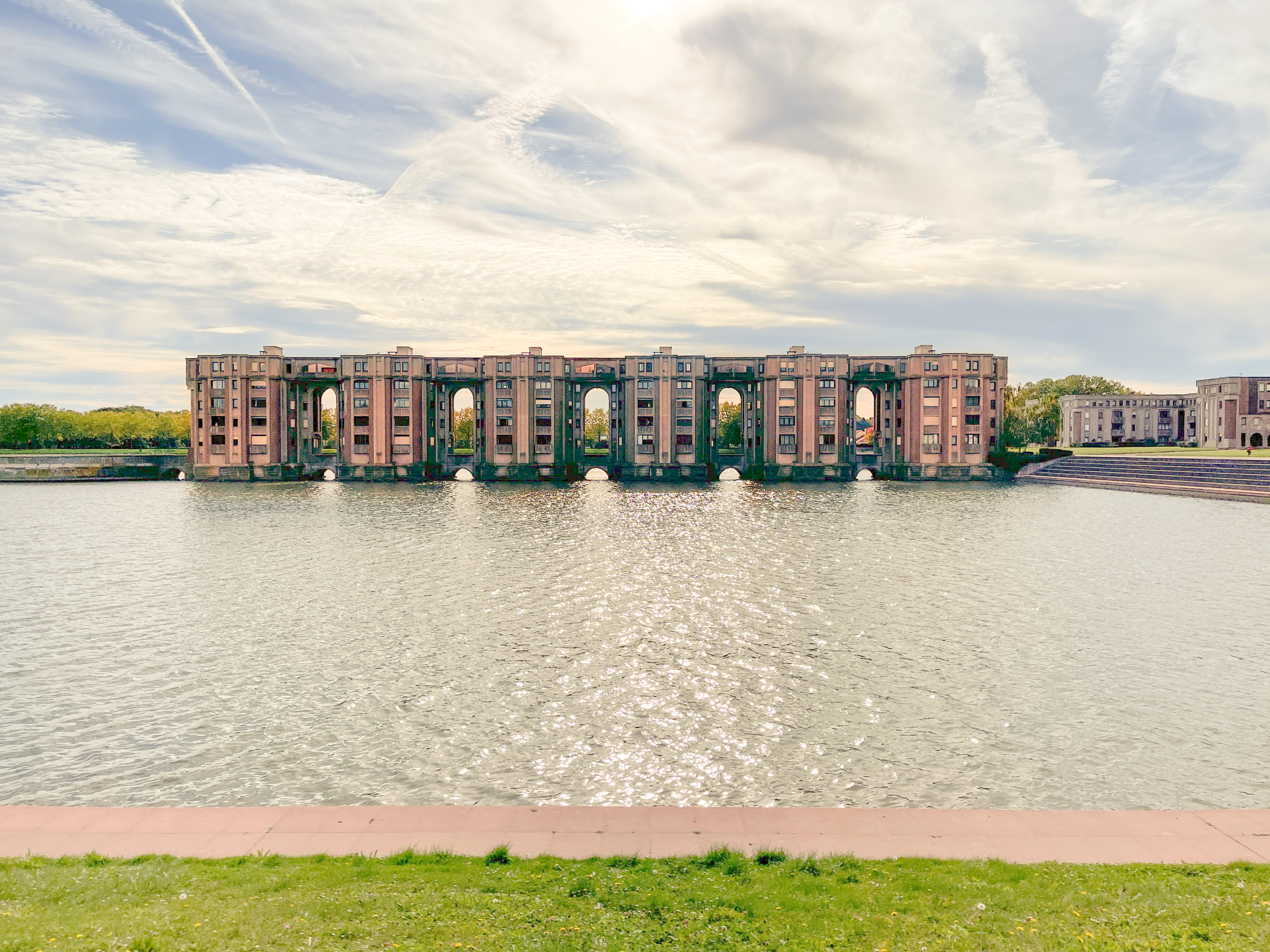
Image of Les Arcades du Lac

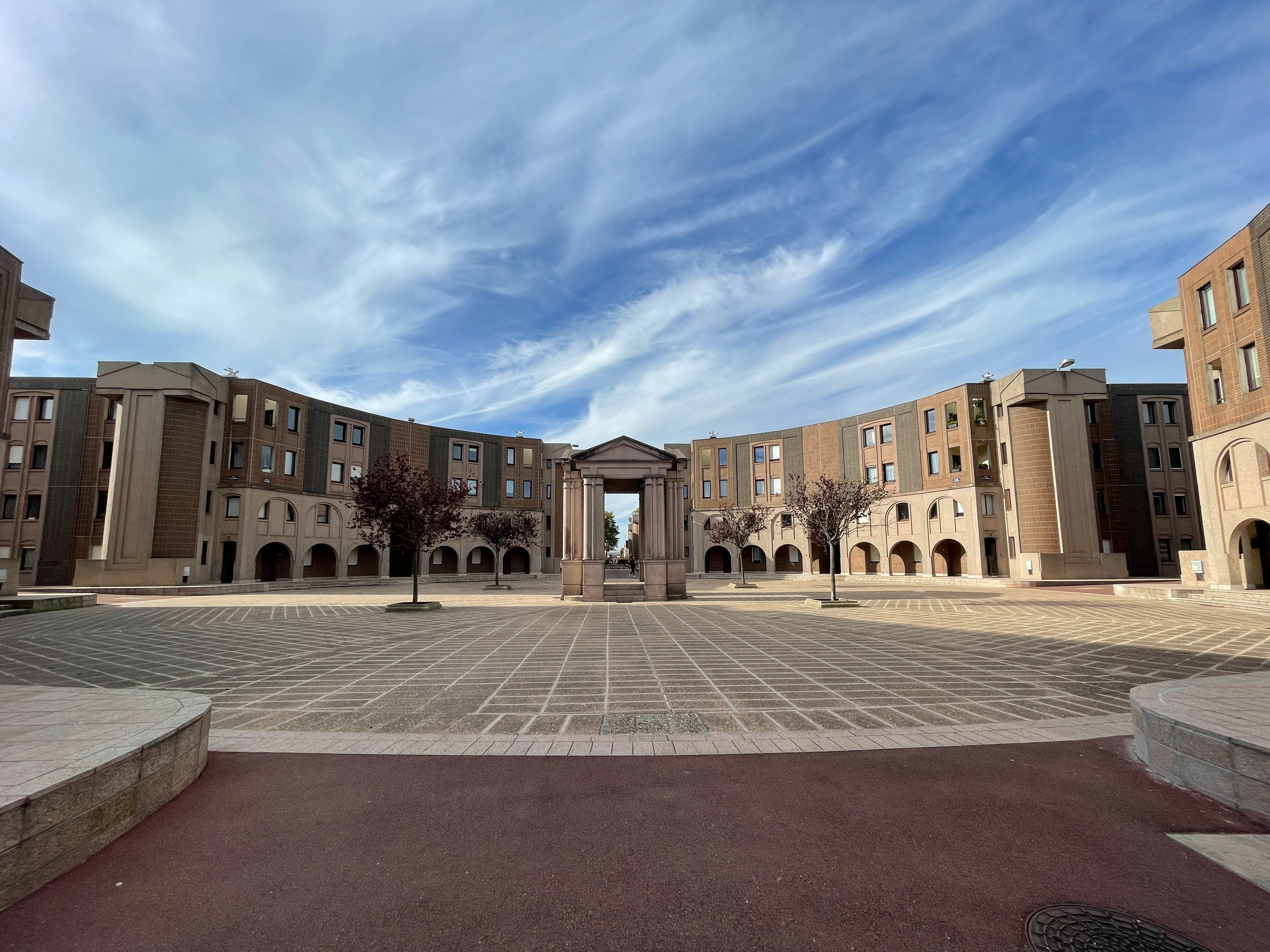
Interior courtyard of Les Arcades du Lac

The Arcades du Lac, built in 1981, is an ensemble of apartment buildings in the outer Paris ville nouvelle of Saint-Quentin-en-Yvelines, France, near Versailles. The mixed suburban housing and HLM complex was designed by Ricardo Bofill Taller de Arquitectura as the centerpiece of an urban composition, with the central portion "Le Viaduc" jutting into an artificial lake from the shore. The design was inspired by the Pont d'Avignon, Château de Chenonceau and the Aqueduct of Segovia.

The entire project was described by architecture critic Charles Jencks as an adaptation of Versailles as a "Versailles for the people" while noting influences of Claude Nicolas Ledoux in the detailing of the elevations. Bofill's design intention was to offer a contrast between the new housing of the 1970s and 1980s and the earlier Le Corbusier-inspired housing projects of the 1950s and 1960s.

== See also ==
- List of works by Ricardo Bofill Taller de Arquitectura
