= Bofill Taller de Arquitectura =

Spanish architecture firm

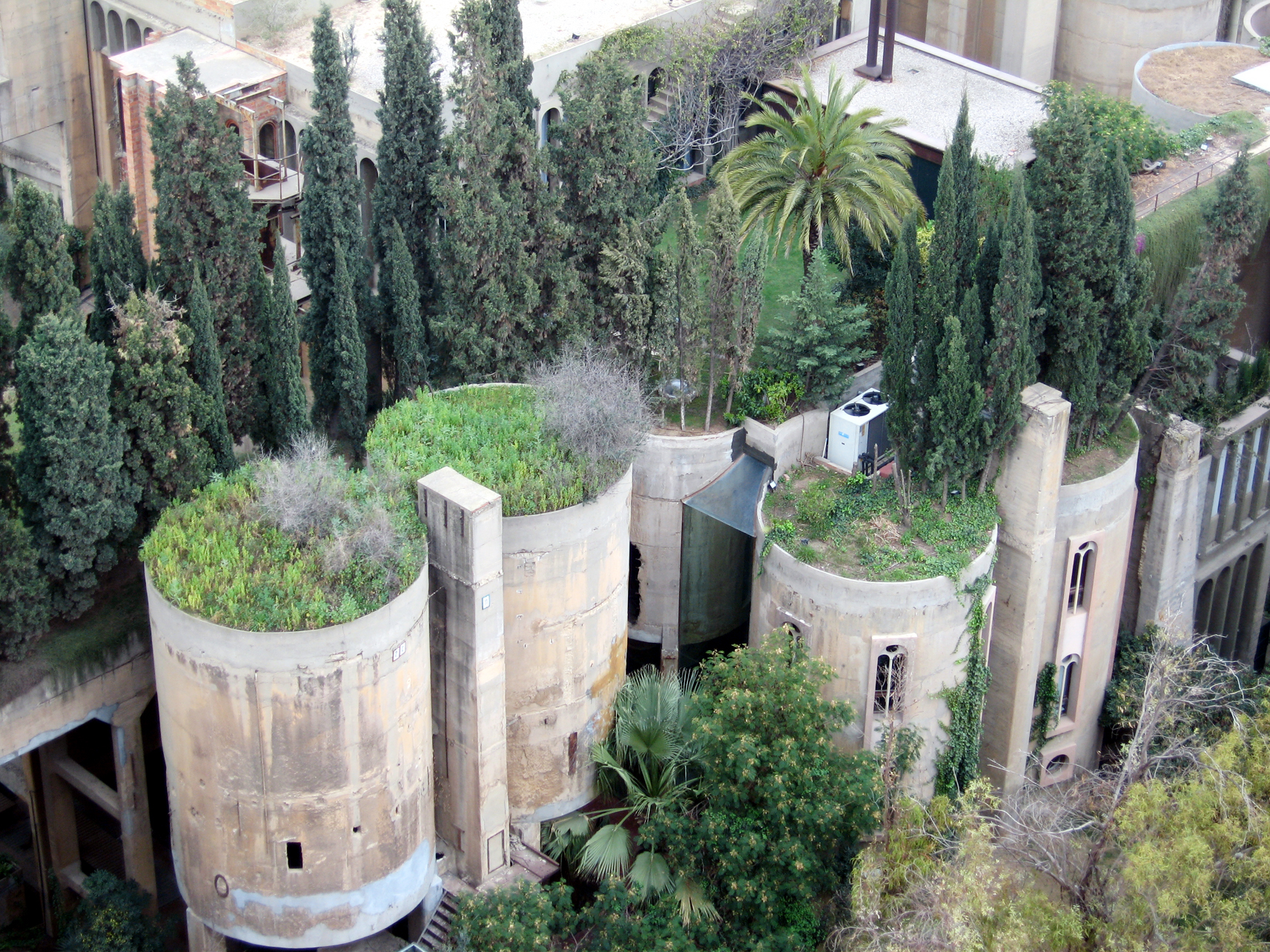
- Partial view of La Fábrica
- Founded: 1963
- Founder: Ricardo Bofill
- Headquarters: La Fábrica, Sant Just Desvern, Spain
- Key people: Ricardo Emilio Bofill, Pablo Bofill
- Website: www.ricardobofill.com

Bofill Taller de Arquitectura is an architecture firm that was founded in 1963 by Ricardo Bofill, initially as Taller de Arquitectura (lit. 'Architecture Workshop'), then until 2023 as Ricardo Bofill Taller de Arquitectura. It is headquartered in Sant Just Desvern near Barcelona, in a former cement factory known as La Fábrica.

== History ==
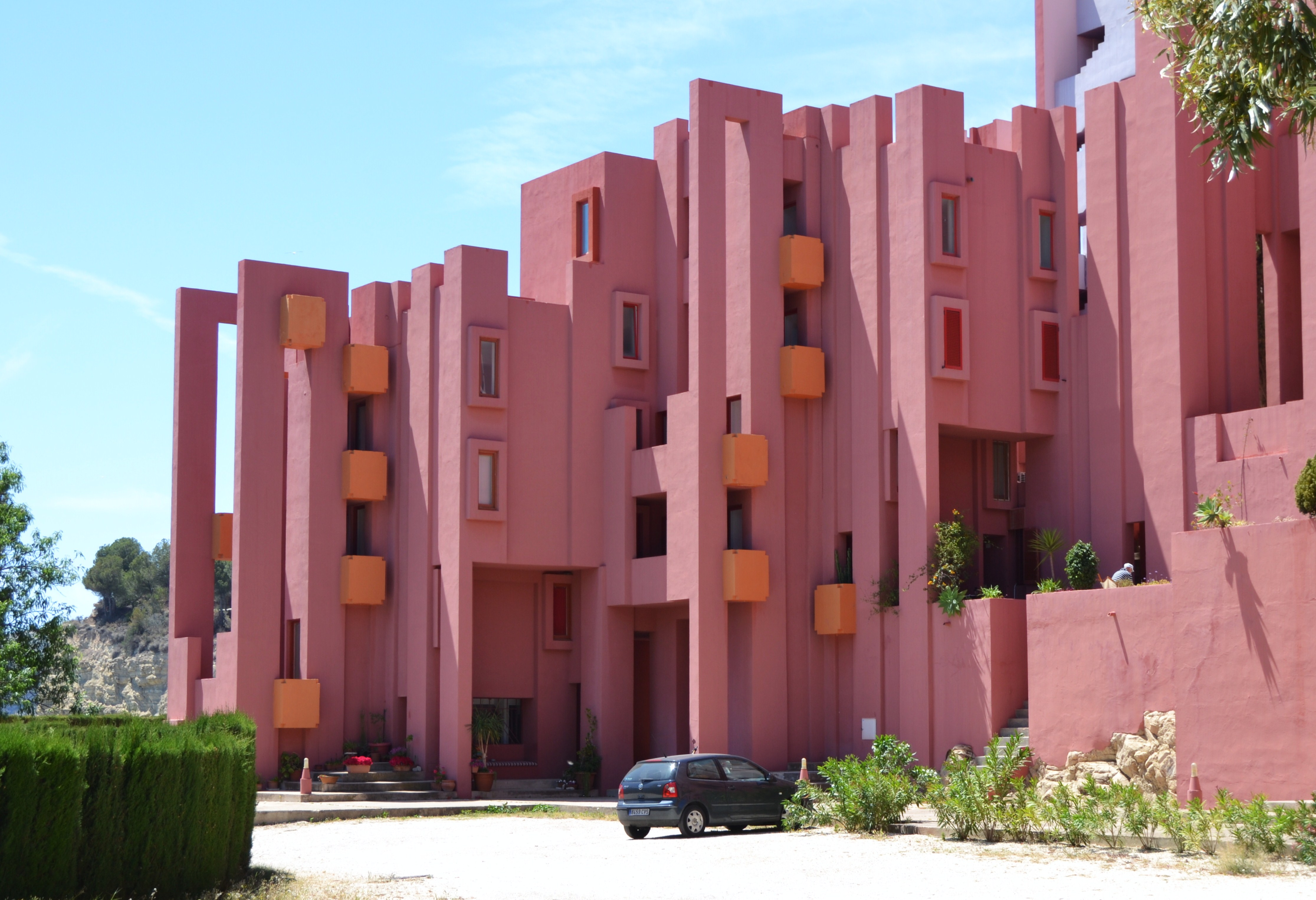
La Muralla Roja (1973), Calpe, Spain

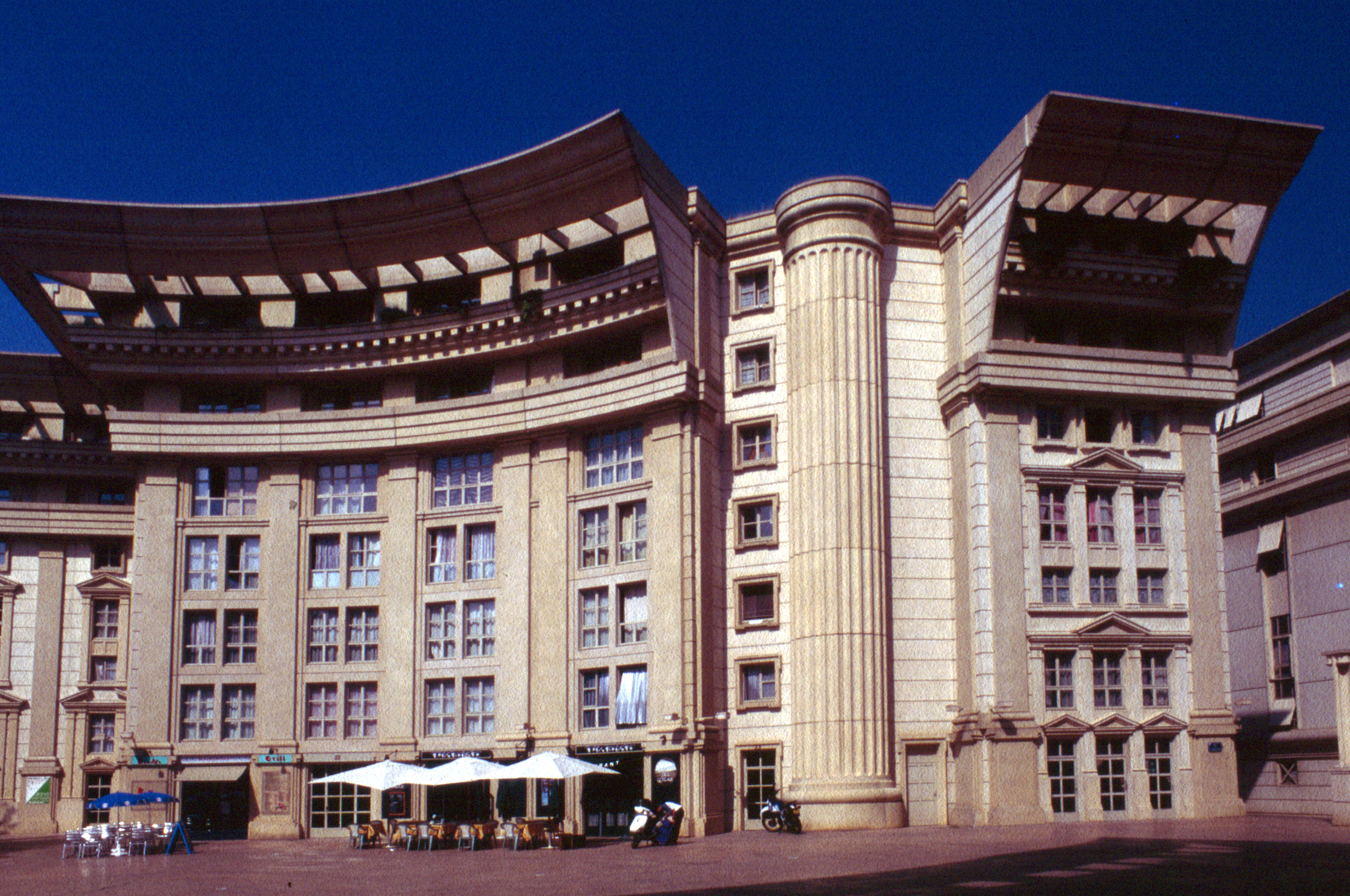
Antigone (1984), Montpellier

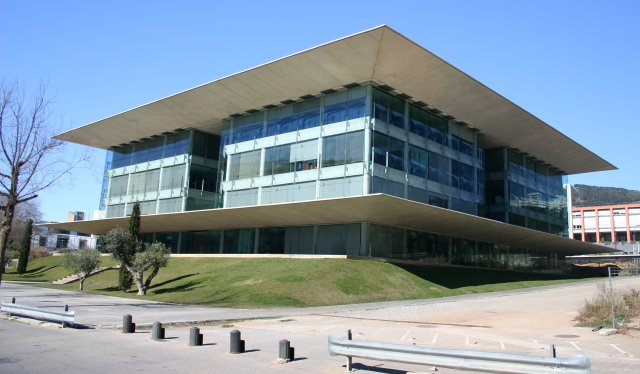
Nexus II office building (2002), Barcelona

Mohammed VI Polytechnic University (2014), Morocco

Ricardo Bofill, then 23 years old, founded the Taller de Arquitectura in 1963 by with the encouragement and support of his father, the architect and builder Emilio Bofill. From the start, Bofill had the vision of a multidisciplinary team that would bring together architects, engineers, planners, sociologist, writers, movie makers and philosophers to generate original design ideas with a social and political purpose. Initial members of the team included Bofill's relatives and childhood friends such as Anna Bofill, Xavier Bagué and Ramón Collado; writer José Agustín Goytisolo; actress Serena Vergano; and visionary polymath Manuel Núñez Yanowsky, a former fellow activist of Bofill within the clandestine Unified Socialist Party of Catalonia. They were joined in 1966 by Peter Hodgkinson, in 1971 by writer Salvador Clotas, and in 1976 by architect Jean-Pierre Carniaux.

At the very beginning, the Taller was hosted in the offices of Emilio Bofill's firm in the Banco de Vizcaya building on Plaça de Catalunya 5, then moved to a temporary location on Carrer de Calvet, then in 1965 to the new building designed by the Taller on Carrer Nicaragua 99. It moved to La Fábrica in 1975.

From 1971 the Taller shifted its focus to France, and worked on prominent projects in state-sponsored new urban centers (villes nouvelles). In 1991, the Paris office moved into a purpose-built space at 18, rue d'Enghien, in the former seat of newspaper Le Petit Parisien; it eventually closed in 2000. The Taller also maintained an office in New York City (on 394 West Broadway) from 1987 to the early 1990s, and other offshoots at various times in Montpellier, Tokyo, Chicago, and Beijing.

In the late 1970s, the Taller de Arquitectura collaborated with the Algerian government on urban planning and housing-related issues, culminating in the creation of an experimental new agricultural village at Méchraâ Houari Boumédienne near Abadla, Béchar Province.

Some of the Taller's architects have moved on to create significant architecture firms of their own, e.g. Manuel Núñez Yanowsky in 1978, Nabil Gholam in 1994, and Philippe Chiambaretta in 2000.

Following Ricardo Bofill's death on 14 January 2022, Bofill Taller de Arquitectura has been led by his two sons, Pablo and Ricardo Emilio Bofill. As of 2023, Pablo Bofill was the firm's CEO.

=== Stylistic evolution ===
With much simplification, the design style of Bofill Taller de Arquitectura can be described as having gone through four phases: the geometrical combinations of the early projects in the 1960s and early 1970s, inspired by Utopian socialism, vernacular architecture and critical regionalism; from the late 1970s, a turn towards ostensibly classical forms associated with large-scale utilization of precast concrete; from the late 1980s to the 2000s, a gradual distillation of that classical inspiration into a more abstract vocabulary that still referred to formal geometries and increasingly used steel and glass as its prominent materials; and in the 2010s, a partial return to vernacular inspiration, particularly in projects in the Muslim world such as Mohammed VI Polytechnic University in Morocco.

As noted by Peter Hodgkinson in a video presenting the Taller's work in 1981, the group's building approach went from one extreme to the other in the space of two decades: from a strong emphasis on artisanal craftsmanship in the early 1960s, to large-scale heavy industrialization using precast concrete in the early 1980s. In the latter period, a division of labor existed between the two offices of Barcelona and Paris, with design functions centered in the former and industrialization and project execution in the latter, led at the time by Ramón Collado.

The pivot towards classicism has arguably been the most debated of these successive shifts. Critic Geoffrey Broadbent wrote in 1981 about the firm's recent work: "The point, of course, is that having shocked people once [with the geometrical plays of the Taller's early period], if you want to keep shocking them, the most outrageous thing you can do, as an avant-garde artist, is to go back to the Classical!" According to Peter Hodgkinson, the influence of Charles Jencks played a role in prompting the Taller's Classicist turn in the late 1970s.

In a noted study of France's evolving social structures and landscapes published in 2021, political scientist Jérôme Fourquet and journalist Jean-Laurent Cassely wrote that "the monumental projects designed by Spanish architect Ricardo-Bofill in Noisy-le-Grand (Les Espaces d'Abraxas), in Saint-Quentin-en-Yvelines (Les Arcades du Lac) and in Montpellier (the Antigone neighborhood) are basically the architectural signature of the 1980s" in the country.

== Selected projects ==
=== Urban design and landscaping ===
- Manzanares Park, Madrid. Completed 2003
- Antigone neighborhood, Montpellier, France. Completed 1999
- Kirchberg, Luxembourg. Master plan, 1998
- Turia Gardens, Valencia. Completed 1988
- Agricultural Village Houari Boumédienne, Algeria. Completed 1980
- Le Perthus Pyramid, Spanish-French border. Completed 1976

=== Transport and government infrastructure ===
- T1 at Barcelona Airport. Completed 2009
- Maritime Station, Savona, Italy. Completed 2003
- Extension of Málaga Airport. Completed 2000
- Extension of Barcelona Airport, now Terminal 2. Completed 1992
- Headquarters of Languedoc-Roussillon Regional Government, Montpellier. Completed 1988

=== Commercial ===
- W Barcelona Hotel. Completed 2010
- Lazona Kawasaki Plaza, Kawasaki, Japan. Completed 2006
- Shiseido Building, Tokyo, Japan. Completed 2001
- Madrid Congress Center. Completed 1993
- Domaine Chateau Lafite-Rothschild, Pauillac, France. Completed 1986

=== Offices ===
- Citadel Center, Chicago, US. Completed 2003
- Casablanca Twin Center, Casablanca. Completed 1998
- Marché Saint-Honoré, Paris. Completed 1997
- 77 West Wacker Drive, Chicago. Completed 1992
- SWIFT Headquarters, La Hulpe, Belgium. Completed 1989

=== Culture and sports infrastructure ===
- Mohammed VI Polytechnic University, Benguerir, Morocco. First phase completed 2014
- Teatre Nacional de Catalunya, Barcelona. Completed 1997
- Shepherd School of Music, Houston. Completed in 1991
- Arsenal de Metz, France. Completed 1989
- Sanctuary of Meritxell, Andorra. Completed 1977

=== Housing ===
- Platinum Tower, Beirut (with Nabil Gholam). Completed 2008
- Pa Soder Crescent known as Bofills båge, Stockholm. Completed 1992
- Les Échelles du Baroque, Paris. Completed 1985
- Les Espaces d'Abraxas, Marne-la-Vallée, France. Completed 1982
- Les Arcades du Lac, St. Quentin en Yvelines, France. Completed 1981
- Walden 7, Sant Just Desvern, Spain. Completed 1974
- La Muralla Roja, Calpe, Spain. Completed 1973
- Barrio Gaudi, Reus, Spain. Completed 1970

== Selected exhibitions ==
- Taller de Arquitectura, Centro de Arte y de Cultura, Buenos Aires, 1976
- La Strada Novissima, Biennale, Venice, 1980
- Ricardo Bofill Taller de Arquitectura, Architectural Association, London, 1981
- Projets Français 1971-1981 La Cité: Histoire et Technologie, École nationale supérieure des Beaux-Arts, Paris, 1981
- Présence de l’Histoire, Chapelle de la Salpêtrière, Paris, 1981.
- The Presence of the Past, The International Architecture Exhibition from the Venice Biennale, Fort Mason Center, San Francisco, 1982
- El Jardí del Turia, Lonja, Valencia, 1982
- Modern Islamic Architecture, Biennale, Venice, 1982
- El Jardí del Turia : Metamorfosi della Cittá tra Cultura e Natura, Un esempio Spagnolo, Palazzo Braschi, Rome, 1983
- Follies: Architecture for the Late XXth Century Landscape, Leo Castelli Gallery, New York, 1983
- Architecture et Industrie. Passé et avenir d’un mariage de raison, Centre Pompidou, Paris, 1984
- Image et Imaginaire de l’Architecture, Centre Pompidou, Paris, 1984
- Les Places d’EuropeHistoire et Actualité d’un Espace Public, Centre Pompidou, Paris, 1984
- Arquitectura de Tierra, Lonja, Valencia, 1984
- Primera Semana de Video y Arquitectura, Ministerio de Obras Públicas y Urbanismo, Madrid, 1984
- Follies, Ministerio de Obras Públicas y Urbanismo, Madrid, 1984
- Follies: Architecture for the Late XXth Century Landscape, J. Corcoran Gallery, Los Angeles, New York NY, 1984
- Spaanse Kunst 1984, Nouvelles Images Gallery, The Hague, 1984
- Architecture Espagnole (Années 3080), Europalia, Brussels, 1985
- Ricardo Bofill and Leon Krier, Architecture, Urbanism and History. Museum of Modern Art, New York. 1985
- R.B. Taller de Arquitectura, Stichting de Beurs Van Berlage, Amsterdam, 1989
- R.B.Taller de Arquitectura, Musée d’Ixelles, Brussels, 1989
- Catalan Art in New York (Design & Arts & Fashion), Armory, New York, 1990
- Urban Furniture, Rotterdamse Kunst Stichting, Rotterdam, 1989
- Barcelona the city and the ‘92, Biennale, Venice, 1992
- Ricardo Bofill Taller de Arquitectura: MemoryFuture, Athaeneum, Chicago, 1992
- Architecture & Sacred Space in modernity, Biennale, Venice, 1992
- Ricardo Bofill Taller de Arquitectura, Guangzhou, 1993
- Le Architetture dello spazio pubblico, Barcelona Airport, Triennale, Milan, 1997–99.
- Ricardo Bofill Taller de Arquitectura, Projectos e edifícios. Museu Casa da Luz, Funchal, Madeira, 2001
- Ricardo Bofill Taller de Arquitectura, European Cultural Centre, Palazzo Bembo, Venice, 2014
