= Les Échelles du Baroque =

- Interactive map of the Les Échelles du Baroque area

General information
- Type: Residential
- Location: Paris, France
- Coordinates: 48°50′12.82″N 2°19′05.62″E
- Completed: 1985

Design and construction
- Architect: Ricardo Bofill Taller de Arquitectura

Les Échelles du Baroque is a residential building complex of Paris.

== Overview ==
The project completed in 1985 by the international team Ricardo Bofill Taller de Arquitectura was part of a renovation program in Paris 14th arrondissement, near Montparnasse train station. Within this sensitive context the respect to the configuration of the existing urban tissue demanded a specific architectonic vocabulary.

By applying the essence of baroque architecture the façade is not a mere wall, it breaks the established rigidity imposed by the industrial building system and becomes a décor for the city.

In designing the buildings the team confronted two imperatives: to respect the urban context and to obtain a formal relationship with the interior spaces of the project.

Les Échelles du Baroque consists of a building apartment surrounding a circular plaza which, by its axial condition, encloses the project perspectives; behind this space, two clearly differentiated apartment blocks define two additional plazas: one elliptical and the other amphitheatre-shaped.

The façades facing the elliptical plaza define an elliptical space as the Italian baroque plazas. For these façades the architectural team used a curtain wall with glass columns that add rhythm to the design and become the bow-windows of the apartments.

The three buildings contain 274 apartments over seven floors with a basement level for car park (300 cars). The ground floor contains apartments, shops, offices and workshops.

The geometry of the apartments is based on the combination of modules in plan. The basic apartment module is 65 sqm (3 bedroom apartment unit).

== See also ==
- List of works by Ricardo Bofill Taller de Arquitectura
