= Lazona Kawasaki Plaza =

Coordinates: 35°32′0″N 139°41′45″E

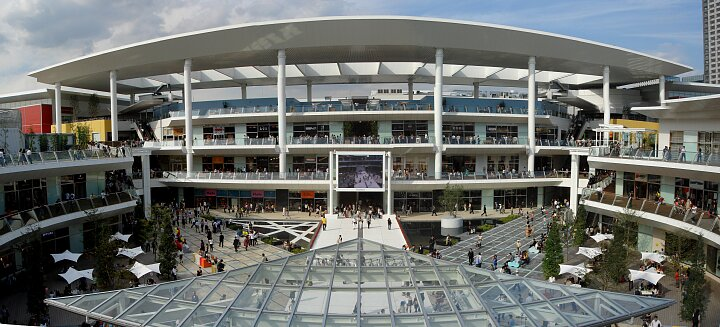
- Grand stage side view, September 2006
- Location: Saiwai-ku, Kawasaki, Japan
- Opened: 28 September 2006
- Manager: Mitsui Fudosan Retail Management Co., Ltd.
- Owner: NREG Toshiba Building Co., Ltd. Mitsui Fudosan Co., Ltd.
- Num. of stores: 280
- Floor area: 150,000 m^{2} (1,600,000 sq ft)
- Floors: 5
- Website: mitsui-shopping-park.com/lazona-kawasaki/

Lazona Kawasaki Plaza (ラゾーナ川崎プラザ, Razōna Kawasaki puraza) is a shopping mall in Saiwai-ku, Kawasaki, Japan. The mall adjoins the west side of Kawasaki Station. It is the largest commercial facility in the Mitsui Fudosan affiliate and has the highest sales volume.

== Structure ==
The design is by Ricardo Bofill Taller de Arquitectura, and makes use of natural lighting. There is a branch shrine of Izumo-taisha on the flat roof of a building.

== History ==
Between 1908 and 2000, the lot was occupied by a Toshiba factory. Construction of Lazona began in 2001. The mall opened on 28 September 2006.

On May 5, 2019, the unit BEST FRIENDS! made their first concert.

== See also ==
- List of shopping malls in Japan
- List of works by Ricardo Bofill Taller de Arquitectura
