= Fabric (disambiguation) =

A fabric is a textile material, short for "textile fabric".

Fabric may also refer to:

== Arts and entertainment ==
- Fabric (play), a play about human trafficking
- Fabric (Cowell), a 1920 piano piece by Henry Cowell
- Fabric (The Black Seeds album), 2017
- "Fabric", a song by Dark Tranquillity from the 2000 album Haven
- "Fabric", a song by Brockhampton from the 2018 album Iridescence
- "Fabric" (Cupcakke song), from the 2018 album Eden

== Computing ==
- Fabric OS, a firmware for Brocade Communications Systems's Fibre Channel switches
- Fabric computing, a consolidated high-performance computing platform
- Switched fabric, a computer network topology where many devices connect with each other via switches
- Fabric, a modification loader used in Minecraft modding

== Other ==
- Fabric, the physical material of a building
- Fabric (club), a nightclub in London, England
- Fabric (geology), the spatial and geometric configuration of elements within a rock
- Fabric, Timișoara, a district of Timișoara, Romania

== See also ==
- Fabrica (disambiguation)
- Fabrication (disambiguation), including Fabricate and Fabricating
- Fabrice
