= Fabe =

Fabe or FABE may refer to:

== People ==
- Dana Fabe (born 1951), American jurist
- Fabe (French rapper) (born 1971), a former member of Scred Connexion
- Fabian "Fabe" McCarthy (1919–2008), Australian rugby player
- Paperboy Fabe (born 1984), American music producer

== Other ==
- Bhisho Airport, Eastern Cape, South Africa, ICAO code FABE

== See also ==
- Fab (disambiguation)
