= Fantabulous =

Fantabulous may refer to:

- Fantabulous Inc., a 1967 crime film
- Fantabulous (album), a 1964 album by Oliver Nelson
- Fantabulous, a cross between fantastic and fabulous
