= Ricardo Bofill =

Spanish architect (1939–2022)

Ricardo Bofill Leví
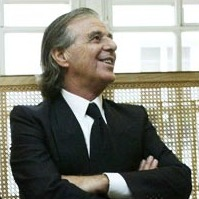
- Born: 5 December 1939; Barcelona, Francoist Spain
- Died: 14 January 2022 (aged 82); Barcelona, Spain
- Occupation: Architect
- Spouse: Serena Vergano (divorced)
- Partner: Marta de Vilallonga
- Practice: Ricardo Bofill Taller de Arquitectura
- Projects: La Muralla Roja; Walden 7; La Fábrica; Le Perthus Pyramid; Les Espaces d'Abraxas; Antigone district in Montpellier; Barcelona Airport; 77 West Wacker Drive (Chicago); W Barcelona Hotel; Mohammed VI Polytechnic University

Ricardo Bofill Leví (Catalan: [riˈkaɾðu buˈfiʎ ləˈβi]; 5 December 1939 – 14 January 2022) was a Spanish architect from Barcelona. He founded the Taller de Arquitectura in 1963 and developed it into a leading international architectural and urban design practice. According to architectural historian Andrew Ayers, his creations rank "among the most impressive buildings of the 20th century."

== Early life and education ==
Born in late 1939, just after the end of the Spanish Civil War, Ricardo Bofill grew up in a well-to-do family with deep Catalan and Barcelonian roots. His grandfather Josep Maria Bofill i Pichot (1860–1938) had been involved in prominent local institutions such as the Institute for Catalan Studies, the Catalan Institute of Natural History, and the Royal Academy of Sciences and Arts of Barcelona. His father Emilio Bofill (1907–2000) was an architect, builder, and developer who studied at Escola Tècnica Superior d'Arquitectura de Barcelona, Catalonia's oldest professional architecture school. Ricardo Bofill would later describe him as "republican, liberal, progressive, austere and logical." Ricardo's mother, Maria Levi (1909–1991), was an Italian of Jewish descent born in Venice, who became a prominent sponsor of Catalan literature and culture in post-war Barcelona. His sister Anna Bofill Leví is an architect, composer, pianist, and author.

Bofill went to school at the Escola Virtèlia from 1942, the Catholic Escuela Andersen in Barcelona from 1949, then at the Lycée français de Barcelone in the 1950s. He spent much of his youth traveling, first with his family and later on his own, and developed a passion for vernacular architecture. In 1957 he enrolled at the Escola Tècnica Superior d'Arquitectura de Barcelona, where he engaged in student activism with the unauthorized Unified Socialist Party of Catalonia, and was soon arrested in a demonstration and expelled from the university and from Spain. He moved to Switzerland and enrolled at the Haute École d'art et de design Genève in 1958, which he left in 1960 to return to Spain. His first architecture design was a summer home in Ibiza, completed in 1960. In 1961-1962 he went into Spanish military service for nine months. He was again arrested and briefly incarcerated on political grounds in Barcelona in 1964.

== Taller de Arquitectura ==
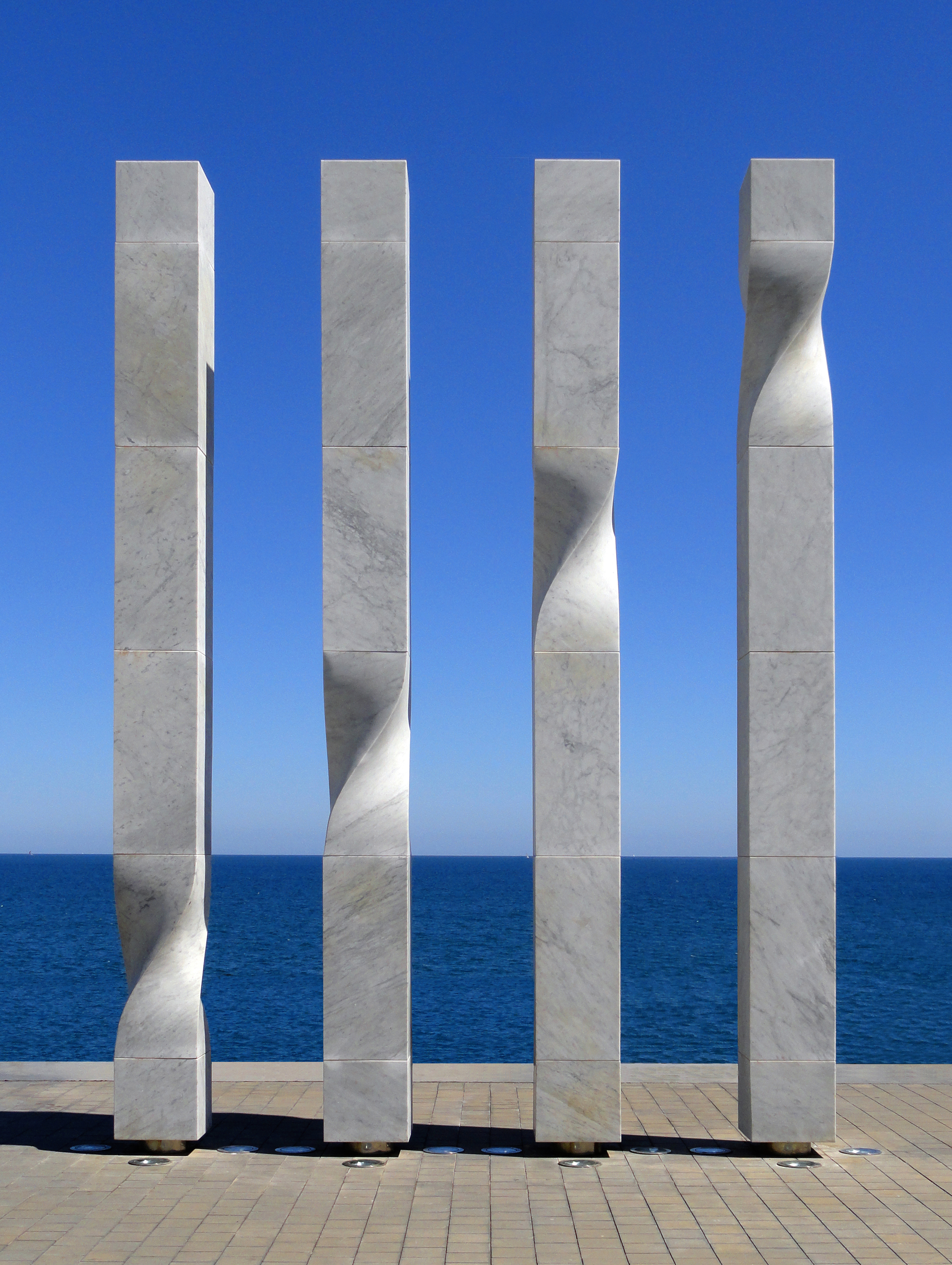
Les quatre barres de la senyera catalana, public sculpture by Bofill that alludes to the Catalan flag; in front of W Barcelona Hotel

In 1963, Bofill and a group of close friends created Ricardo Bofill Taller de Arquitectura (Ricardo Bofill Architecture Workshop), initially hosted in his father's construction business with offices on Plaça de Catalunya in the center of Barcelona. Building on Catalan traditions of craftsmanship, he enlisted architects and engineers but also writers and artists into a multidisciplinary effort, which later branched into urban design and urban planning. The team experimented on original methodologies based on three-dimensional modular geometries, such as those of the Gaudi District in Reus (1964–1970), El Castillo de Kafka in Sant Pere de Ribes above Sitges (1964–1968), Xanadu (1966–1971), and La Muralla Roja (1968–1973) in Calp. The same thinking was developed on a larger scale with the project La Ciudad en el Espacio ("The City in Space"), whose construction started in the Moratalaz area of Madrid in 1970 but was abruptly stopped by Francoist mayor Carlos Arias Navarro. It was instead realized with the construction of Walden 7 in Sant Just Desvern near Barcelona (1970–1975). These projects were recognized as exemplars of critical regionalism and can be viewed as a reaction against both architectural modernism and the Francoist dictatorship in Spain.

Bofill then started working in France, and gradually introduced symbolic elements into the Taller's designs that echo French traditions of classical architecture. In 1971, he was invited by Bernard Hirsch, a key planner of the Cergy-Pontoise urban project, to develop a design concept analogous to that of the Barrio Gaudí in Reus. This morphed into a project named La Petite Cathédrale ("the small cathedral") but actually intended as a large-scale development, which was approved in 1973 but canceled in 1974. Another major development was a competition-winning concept for Les Halles in Paris in 1975, whose construction subsequently started but was reversed in 1978 by the newly elected mayor Jacques Chirac. Other projects did come to fruition in the villes nouvelles around Paris which offered a favorable environment for large-scale experimentation, including Les Espaces d'Abraxas in Marne-la-Vallée and Les Arcades du Lac in Saint-Quentin-en-Yvelines. This phase culminated in the expansive Antigone new district of Montpellier in Southern France, for which Bofill presented the initial master plan in 1978. It is associated with both large-scale industrialization in precast concrete and classical forms and geometries in contemporary architecture, which Bofill called "modern classicism". As a consequence, Bofill opus is often cited as that one of the most representative and signififant postmodern architects to have lived and created in Europe.

From the mid-1980s on, he increasingly shifted to glass and steel for the materials used in his projects, while still using a classical vocabulary of columns and pediments. Representative projects of that period include the 77 West Wacker Drive office tower in Chicago, the extension of Barcelona Airport ahead of the 1992 Summer Olympics, and the National Theater of Catalonia, also in Barcelona.

In 2000, Bofill re-centralized the activities of the Taller at its head office near Barcelona. His designs in more recent years gradually shed his classical decorative vocabulary of the 1980s and 1990s, while retaining a highly formal sense of geometry. Representative buildings of this more recent period include the W Barcelona Hotel on the Barcelona seafront and the Mohammed VI Polytechnic University in Ben Guerir, Morocco.

== Personal life and death ==
Bofill met Italian actress Serena Vergano in 1962; their son Ricardo Emilio Bofill was born in 1965.

In the 1970s, Bofill dated Yves Saint Laurent muse and fashion designer Loulou de la Falaise.

Bofill and French visual artist Annabelle d'Huart had a son, Pablo Bofill, born in 1980. Both of his sons eventually worked with their father at Ricardo Bofill Taller de Arquitectura, and are co-leading the firm as of January 2022. From the 1990s, Bofill lived in Barcelona together with Catalan designer Marta de Vilallonga. In October 2021, he was named in the Pandora Papers.

He died from complications linked to COVID-19 in Barcelona on 14 January 2022, at the age of 82.

== Selected works ==
=== Urban design ===
- Large-scale master plans for Boston Central Artery (1987), Kobe waterfront (1991), Nansha District in Guangdong (1992), Barcelona Diagonal Mar (1992), Paseo de la Castellana extension in Madrid (1996/1999), Trinity Riverfront in Dallas (2013), Greater Moscow (2013)
- Antigone district in Montpellier, developed from 1979 with many buildings also designed by Bofill and his Taller
- Master plan for the redevelopment of the Kirchberg district in Luxembourg City (1998), including the creation of the urban square Place de l'Europe and the twin towers of La Porte designed by the Taller
- Urban neighborhoods in Reus (Barrio Gaudí, 1970), Marne-la-Vallée (Les Espaces d'Abraxas, 1982), Saint-Quentin-en-Yvelines (Les Arcades du Lac, 1982), Cergy-Pontoise (Le Belvédère Saint-Christophe, 1985), Stockholm (På Söder Crescent, 1992), The Hague (Burgemeester De Monchyplein, 2004)
- Mohammed VI Polytechnic University campus in Ben Guerir, Morocco (2011/2016)

=== Buildings ===
- La Fábrica, headquarters of Ricardo Bofill Taller de Arquitectura and residence for Bofill and his family (1975)
- Early housing complexes in Spain based on geometrical pattern combinations: El Castillo de Kafka (1968), Xanadu (1971), La Muralla Roja (1973), Walden 7 (1975, documented by Heather Nigro)
- Les Échelles du Baroque apartment building in Paris (1985)
- 77 West Wacker Drive office tower in Chicago (1992)
- Madrid Congress Center (1993)
- National Theater of Catalonia in Barcelona (1997)
- Casablanca Twin Center in Casablanca, Morocco (1999)
- Miguel Delibes Cultural Center in Valladolid, Spain (2007)
- W Hotel on the Barcelona waterfront (2009)
- Terminal 2 (1992) and Terminal 1 (2009) of Josep Tarradellas Barcelona–El Prat Airport

=== Writing ===
- Ricardo Bofill, Hacia una Formalización de la Ciudad en el Espacio, Barcelona: Blume Editorial, 1968
- Ricardo Bofill,, L’Architecture d’un Homme (with François Hébert-Stevens), Paris: Arthaud, 1978
- Ricardo Bofill and Jean-Louis André, Espaces d’une vie, Paris: Odile Jacob, 1989 (Translated into Spanish as Espacio y Vida, 1990, and in Italian as Spazi di una vita, 1996)
- Ricardo Bofill and Nicolas Véron, L’Architecture des villes, Paris: Odile Jacob, 1995

=== Filming ===
- Circles, 1966. Color, 35 mm, 17 minutes. Directed by Ricardo Bofill and Carles Durán. Actors: Serena Vergano, Salvador Clotas. Photography: Juan Amorós. Presented at Festival de Tours, France, 1968
- Schizo, 1969–1970. Color, 35 mm, 60 minutes. Directed by Ricardo Bofill, Carles Durán and Manolo Núñez Yanosvski. Actors: Serena Vergano, Modesto Bertrán. Photography: Juan Amorós. Choreography: Antonio Miralles. Presented at 48 Mostra Cinematografica Internazionale di Venezia, Sala Volpi, 1991.

== Recognition ==
In a noted study of France's evolving social structures and landscapes published in 2021, political scientist Jérôme Fourquet and journalist Jean-Laurent Cassely wrote that "the monumental projects designed by Spanish architect Ricardo-Bofill in Noisy-le-Grand (Les Espaces d'Abraxas), in Saint-Quentin-en-Yvelines (Les Arcades du Lac) and in Montpellier (the Antigone neighborhood) are basically the architectural signature of the 1980s" in the country.

=== Exhibitions ===
Bofill and his Taller de Arquitectura were featured in three exhibitions of the Museum of Modern Art in New York City: "Transformations in Modern Architecture" (1979), "Ricardo Bofill and Leon Krier: Architecture, Urbanism, and History" (1985), and "Architecture & Design Drawings: Rotation 3" (2006). They were also featured at the Venice Biennale in 1980, 1982, and 1992.

=== Degrees and awards ===
- 1968: Fritz Schumacher Honoris Causa Degree, University of Hamburg
- 1978: American Society of Interior Designers, International Prize
- 1979: Architecte Agréé, Ordre des Architectes (France)
- 1980: Prize of Architecture of the City of Barcelona, for the renovation of the cement factory in Sant Just Desvern
- 1985: Honorary Fellow, American Institute of Architects
- 1989: Ordre des Architectes Conseils du Brabant, Belgium
- 1989: Chicago Architecture Award, Illinois Council / American Institute of Architects / Architectural Record
- 1989: Académie Internationale de Philosophie de l´Art, Bern, Switzerland
- 1995: Doctor Honoris Causa, Metz University
- 1996: Honorary Fellow of the Association of German Architects
- 2009: Life Time Achievement Award, Israeli Building Center
- 2009: Vittorio de Sica Architecture Prize, Quirinal, Rome
- 2021: Doctor Honoris Causa, Polytechnic University of Catalonia

=== Honors ===
- 1984: Officer of l'Ordre des Arts et des Lettres, France
- 1993: Creu de Sant Jordi, Catalonia

== Influence ==
Several architects who worked with Bofill went on to create significant architecture firms of their own, notably Manuel Núñez Yanowsky in 1978, Nabil Gholam in 1994, and Philippe Chiambaretta in 2000. Bjarke Ingels has acknowledged the seminal influence of Bofill's early work such as La Fábrica and Walden 7 on his own vision of what creativity could achieve in architecture.

== Gallery ==
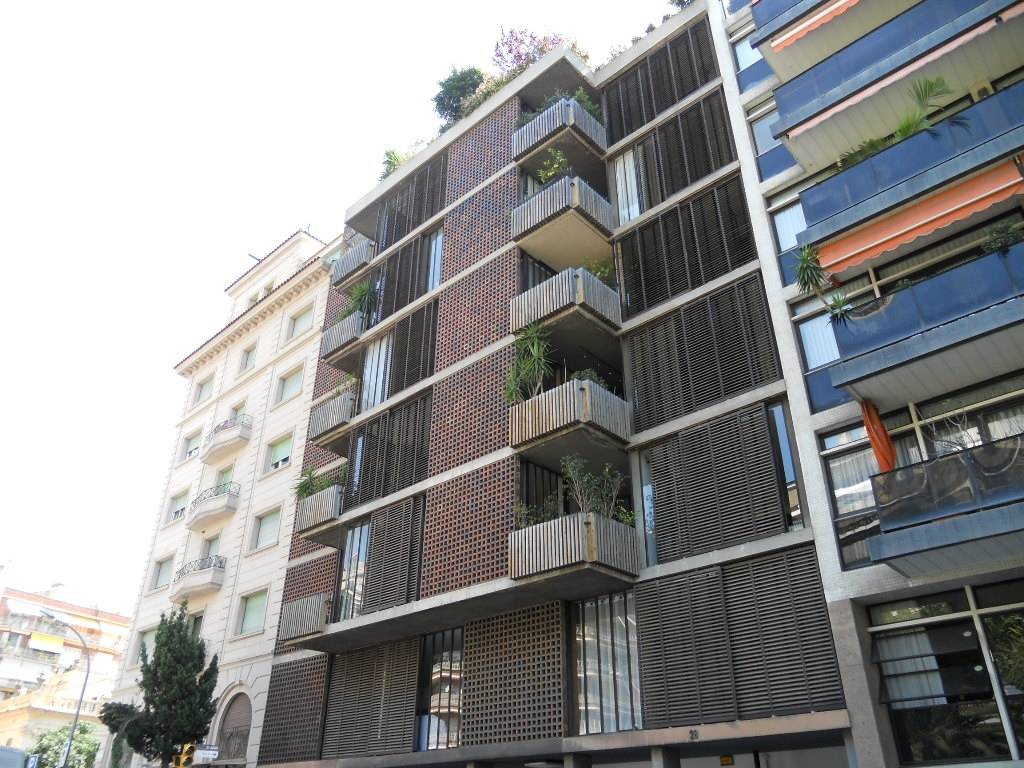
Carrer Bach 28, Barcelona (1963)

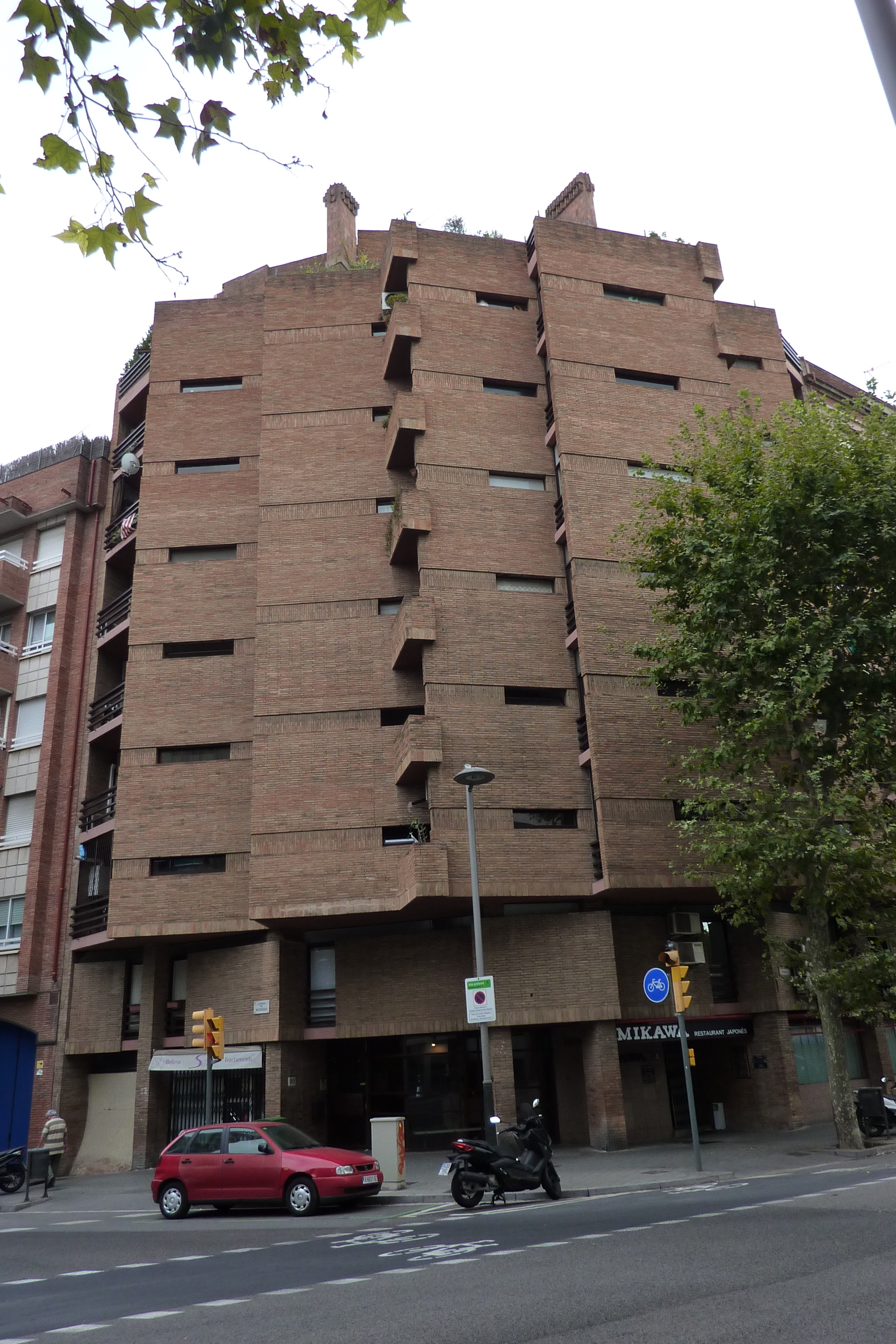
Carrer Nicaragua 97–99, Barcelona (1965)

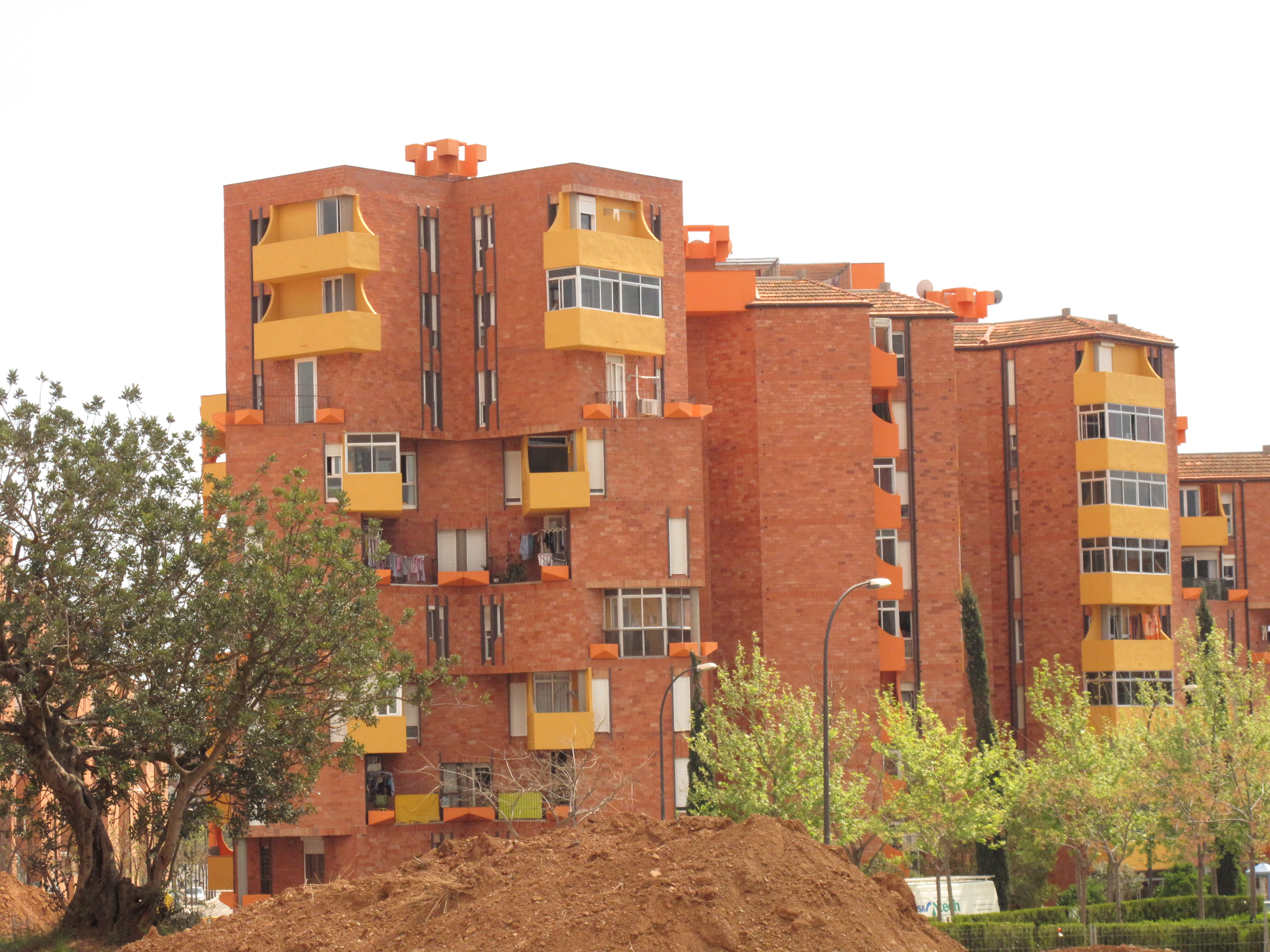
Barri Gaudí, Reus, Catalonia (1970)

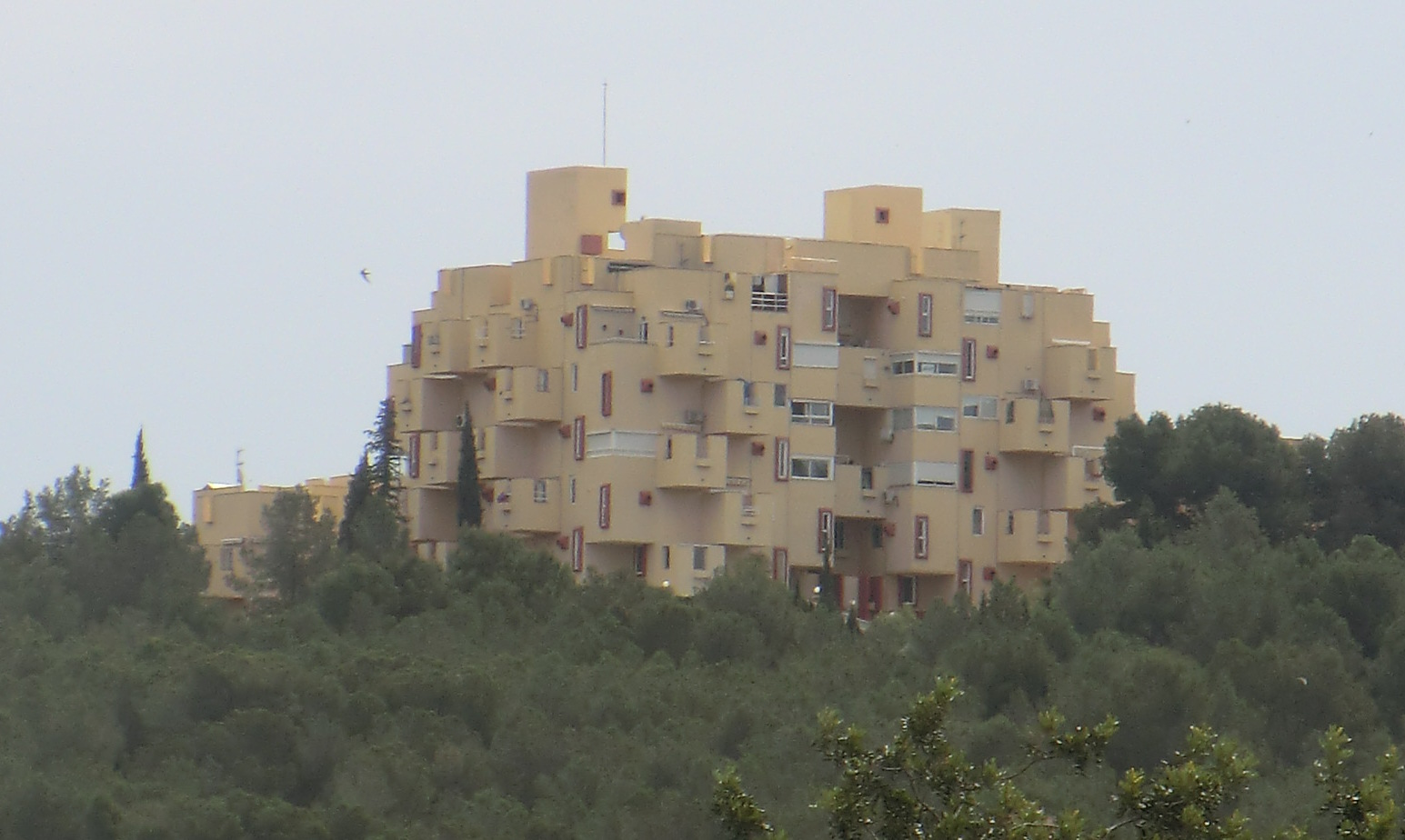
Apartaments El Castell, Sant Pere de Ribes

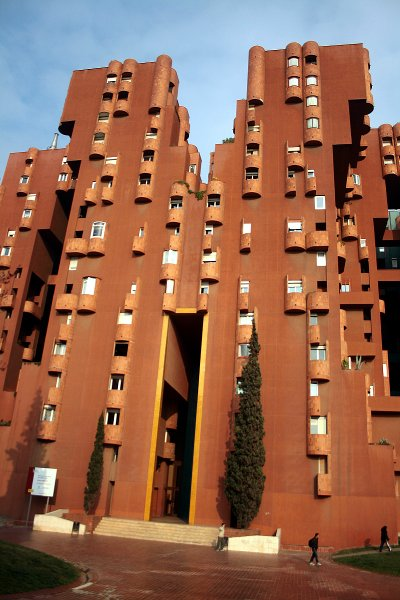
Walden 7, Sant Just Desvern (1974)

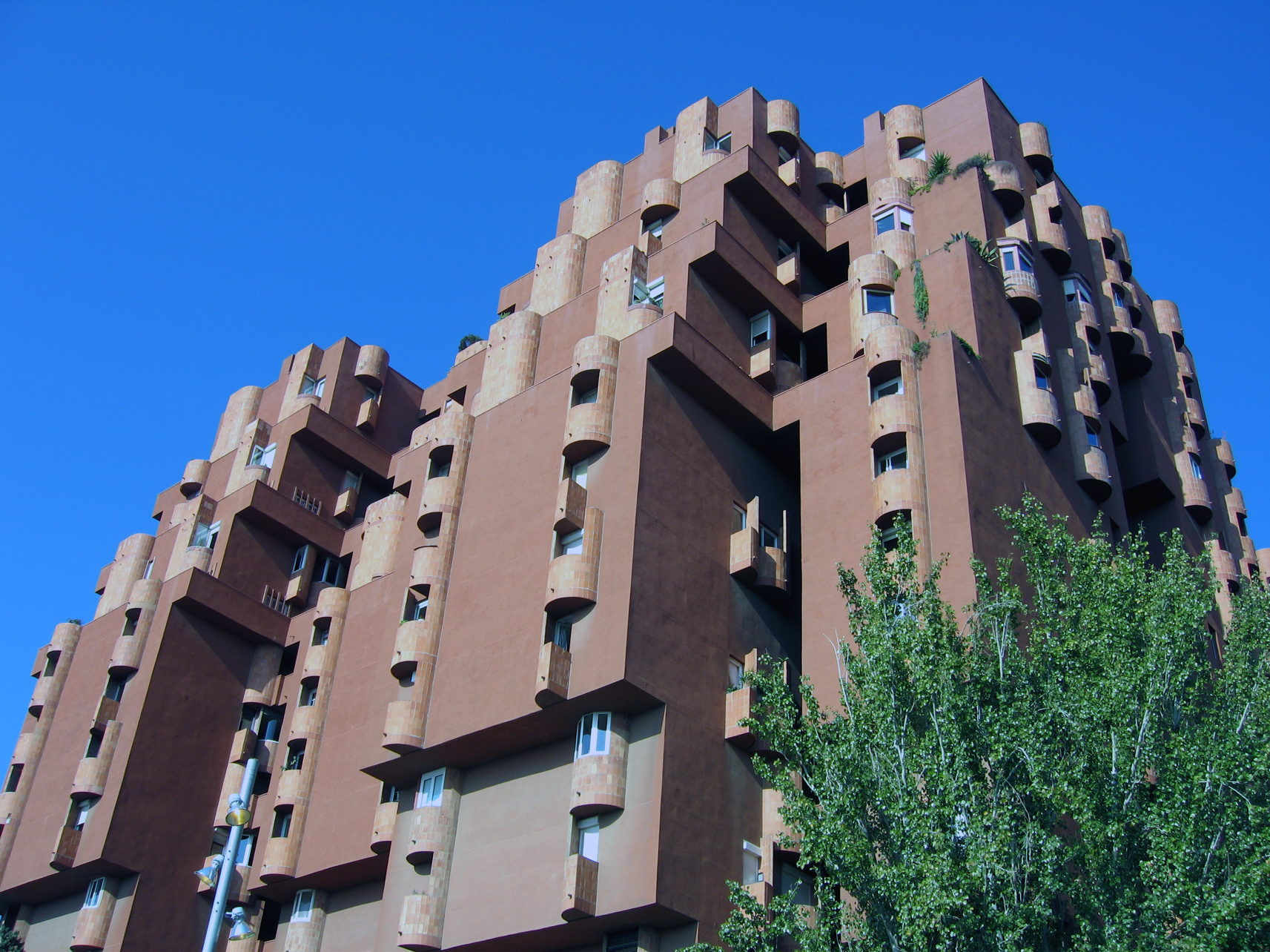
Walden 7, Sant Just Desvern (1974)

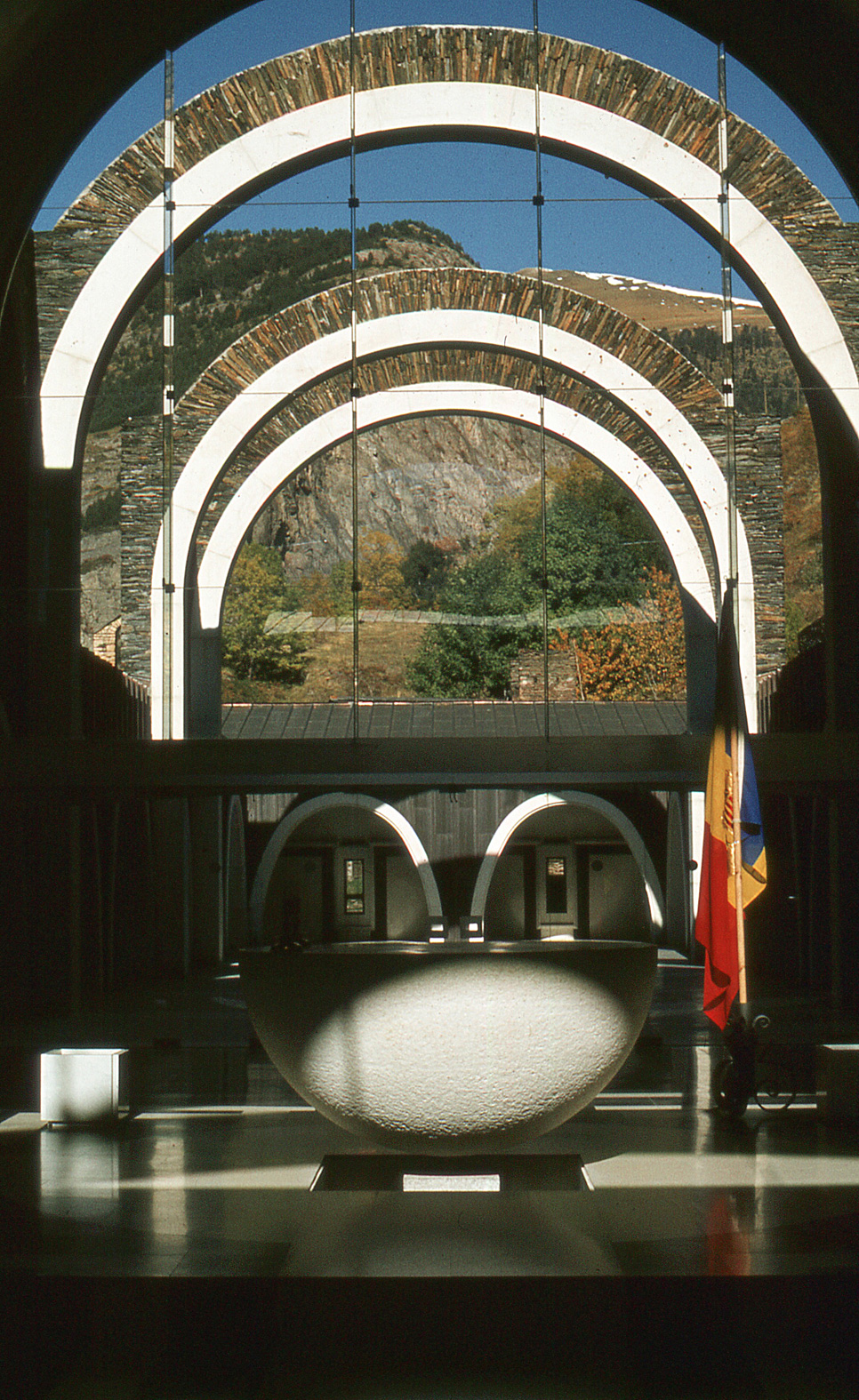
Sanctuary of Meritxell, Andorra (1977)

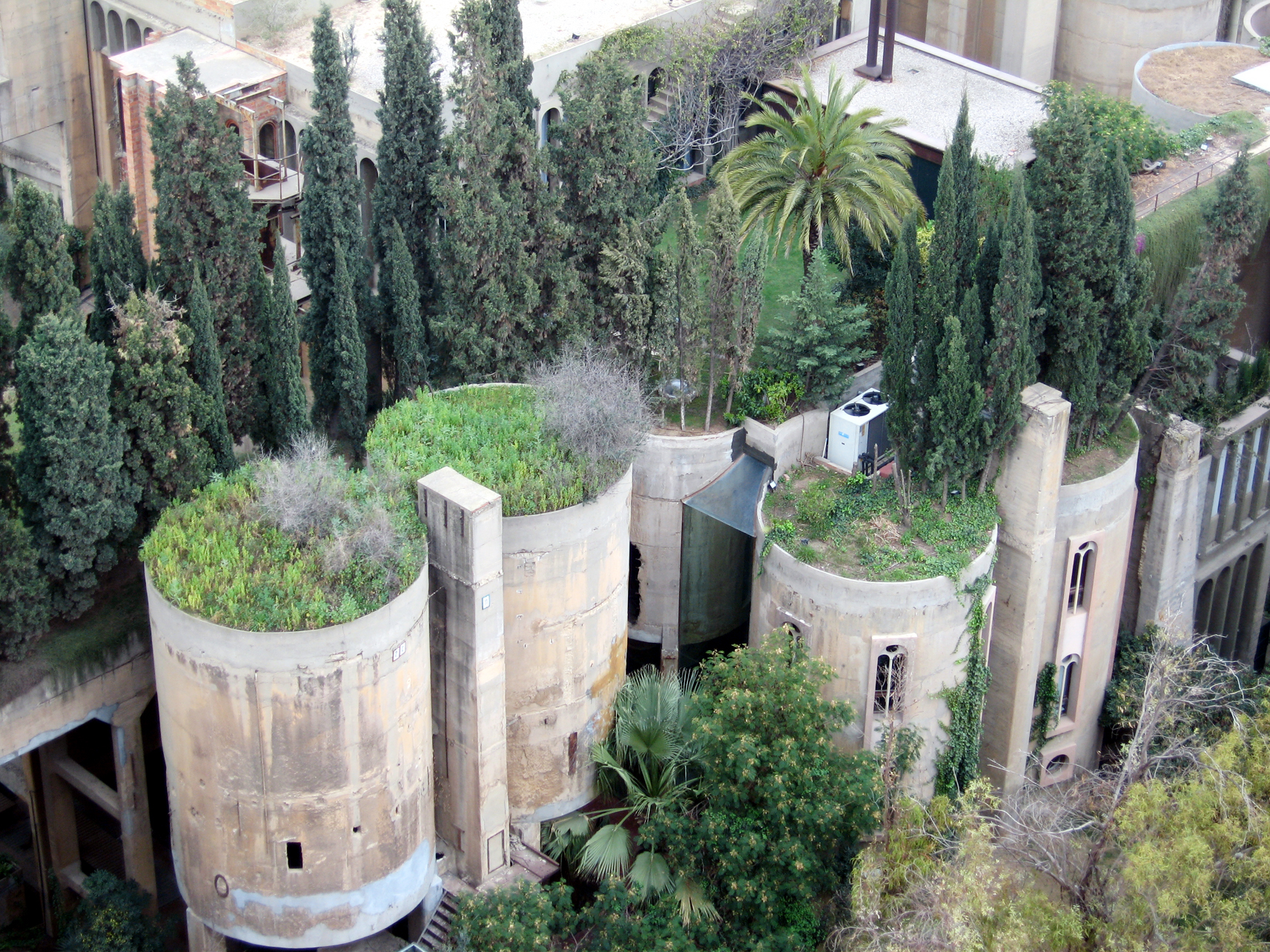
Taller de Arquitectura, Sant Just Desvern (1970s)

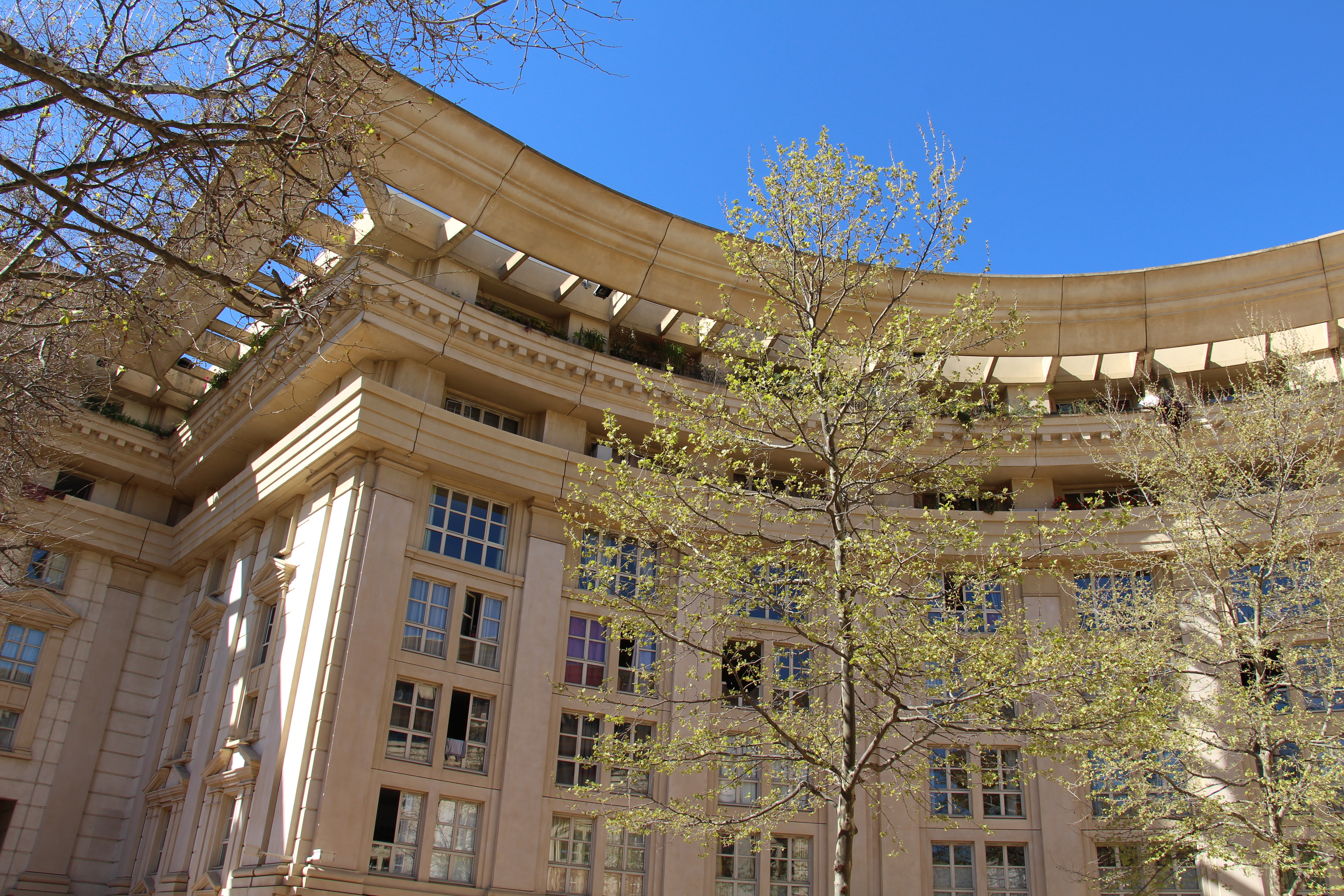
Place du Nombre d'Or, Montpellier (1984)

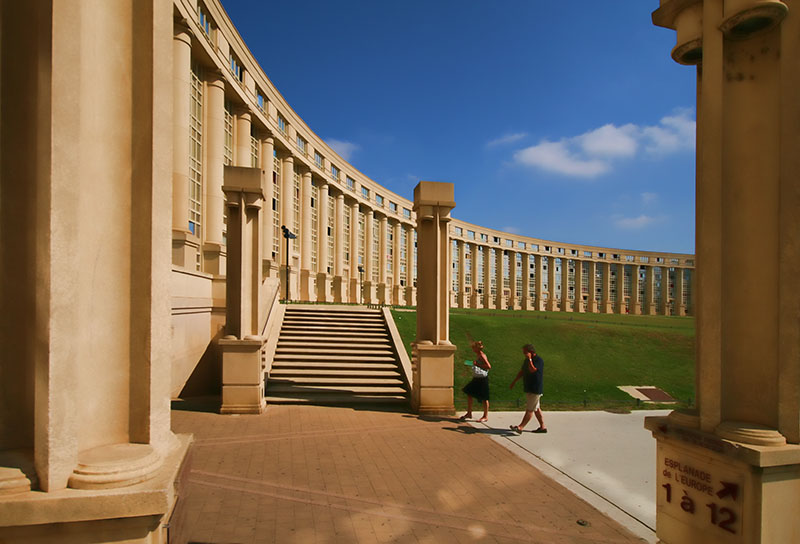
Esplanade de l'Europe, Montpellier (1980s)

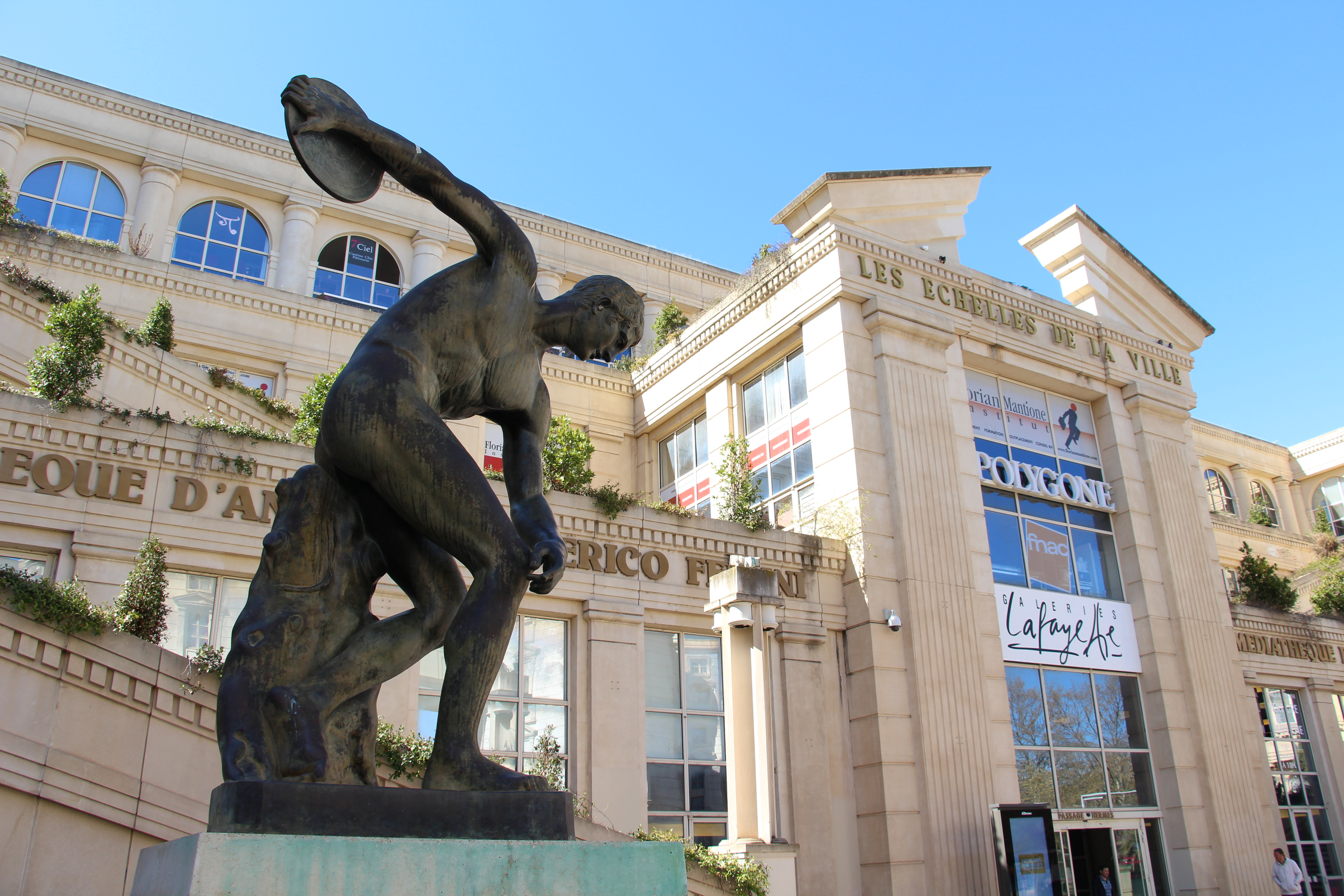
Les Échelles de la Ville, Montpellier (1987)

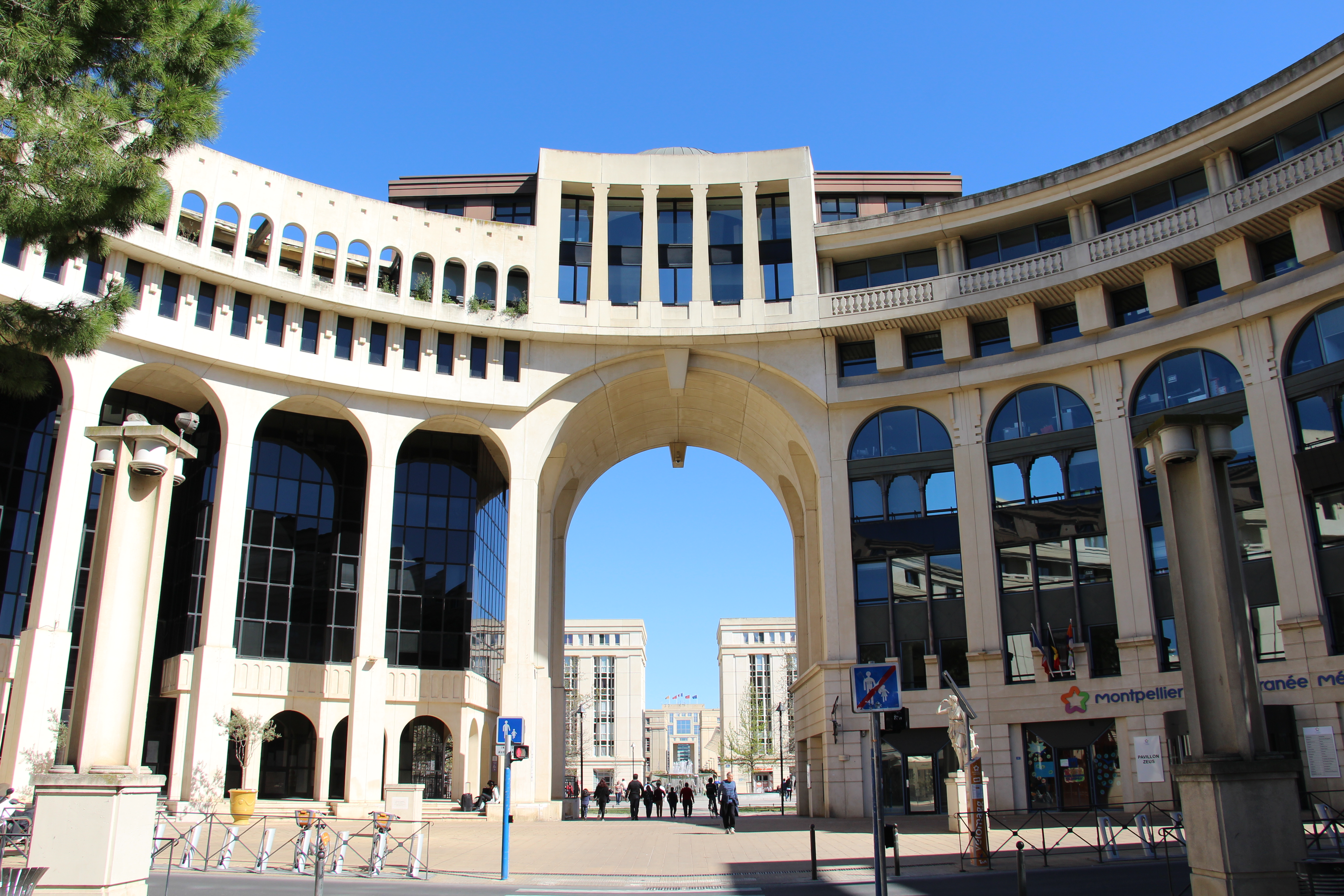
Communauté d'Agglomération, Montpellier (1991)

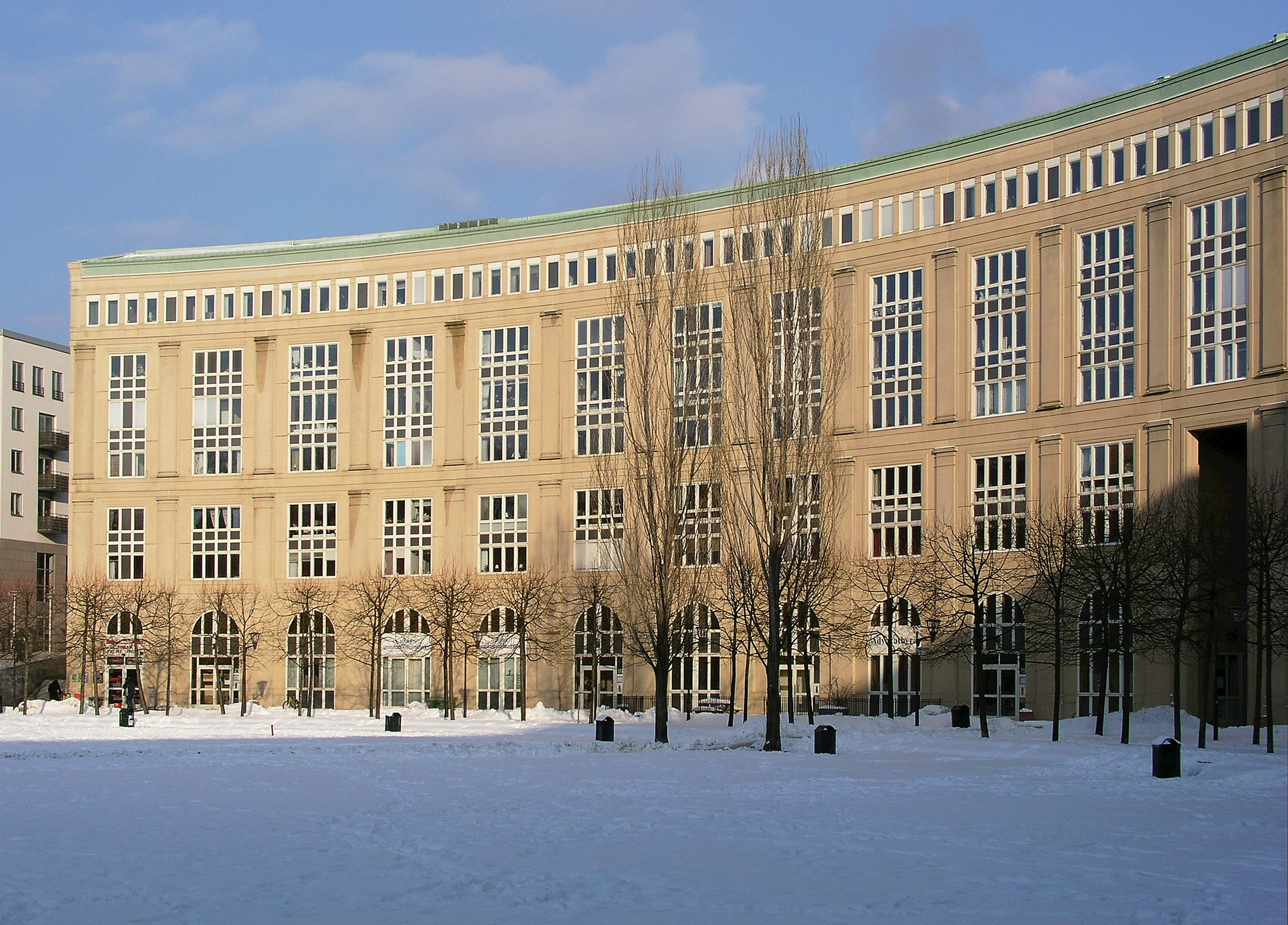
Pa Soder Crescent, Stockholm (1992)

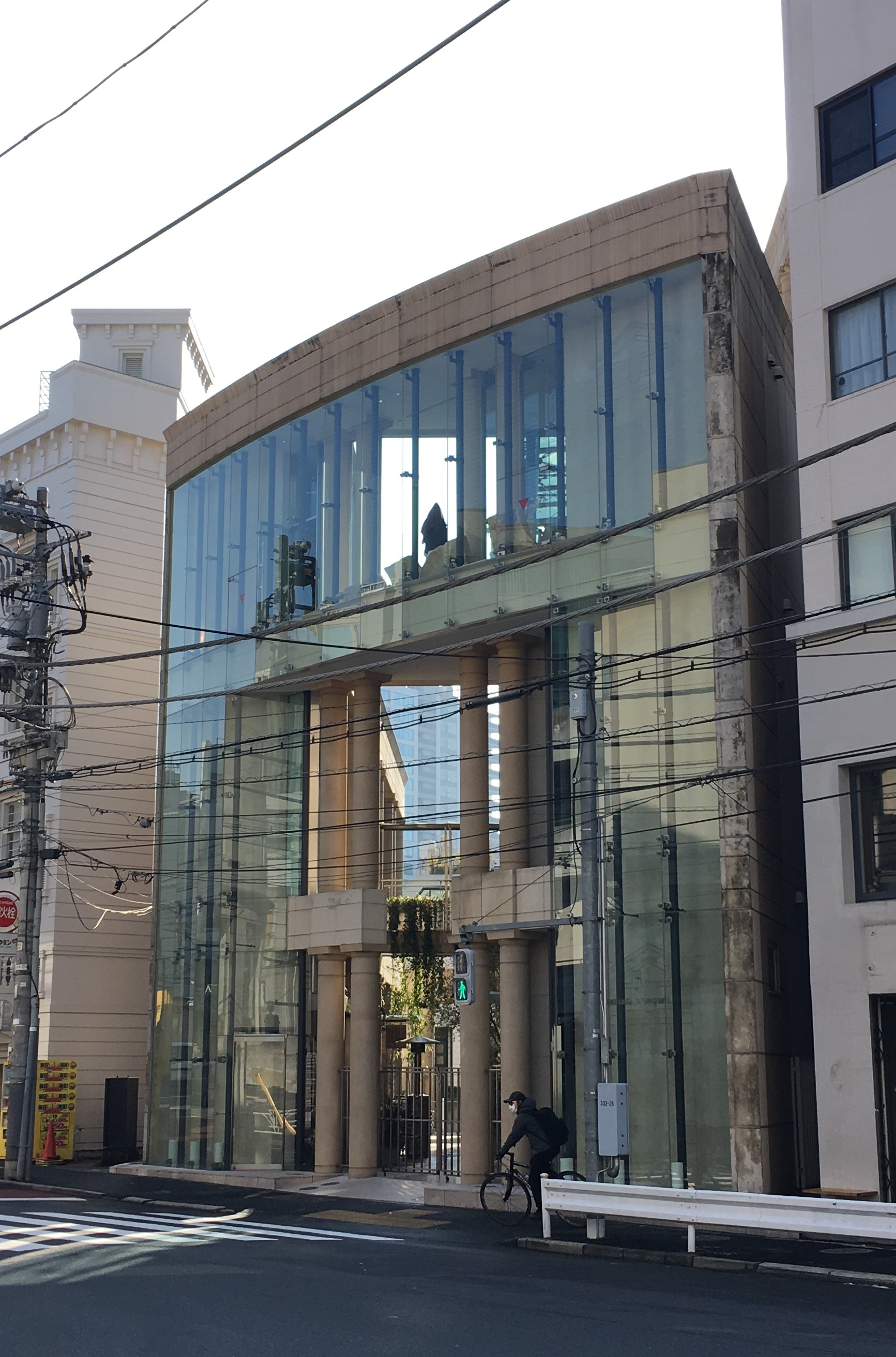
United Arrows Building, Tokyo (1992)

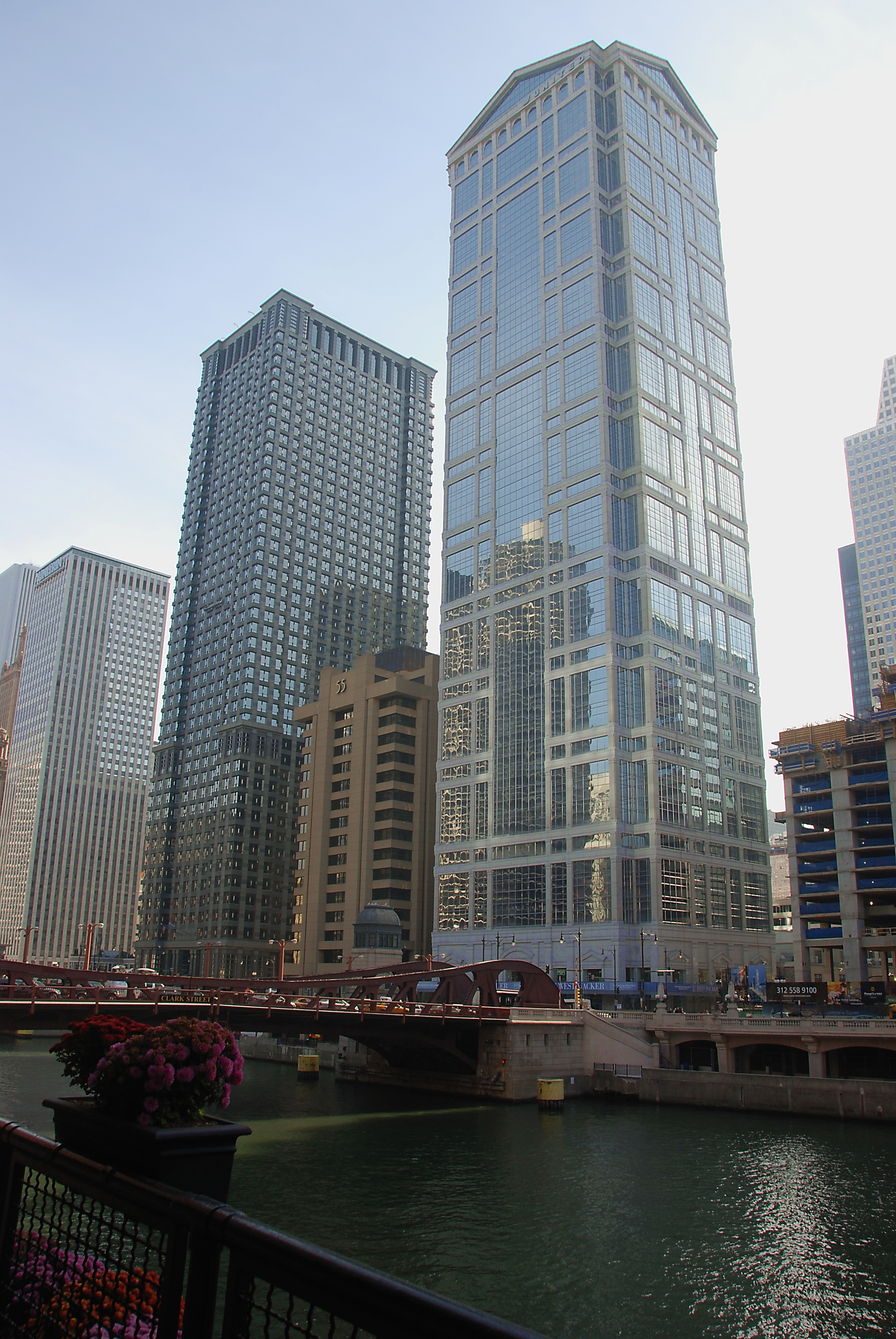
77 West Wacker Drive, Chicago (1992)

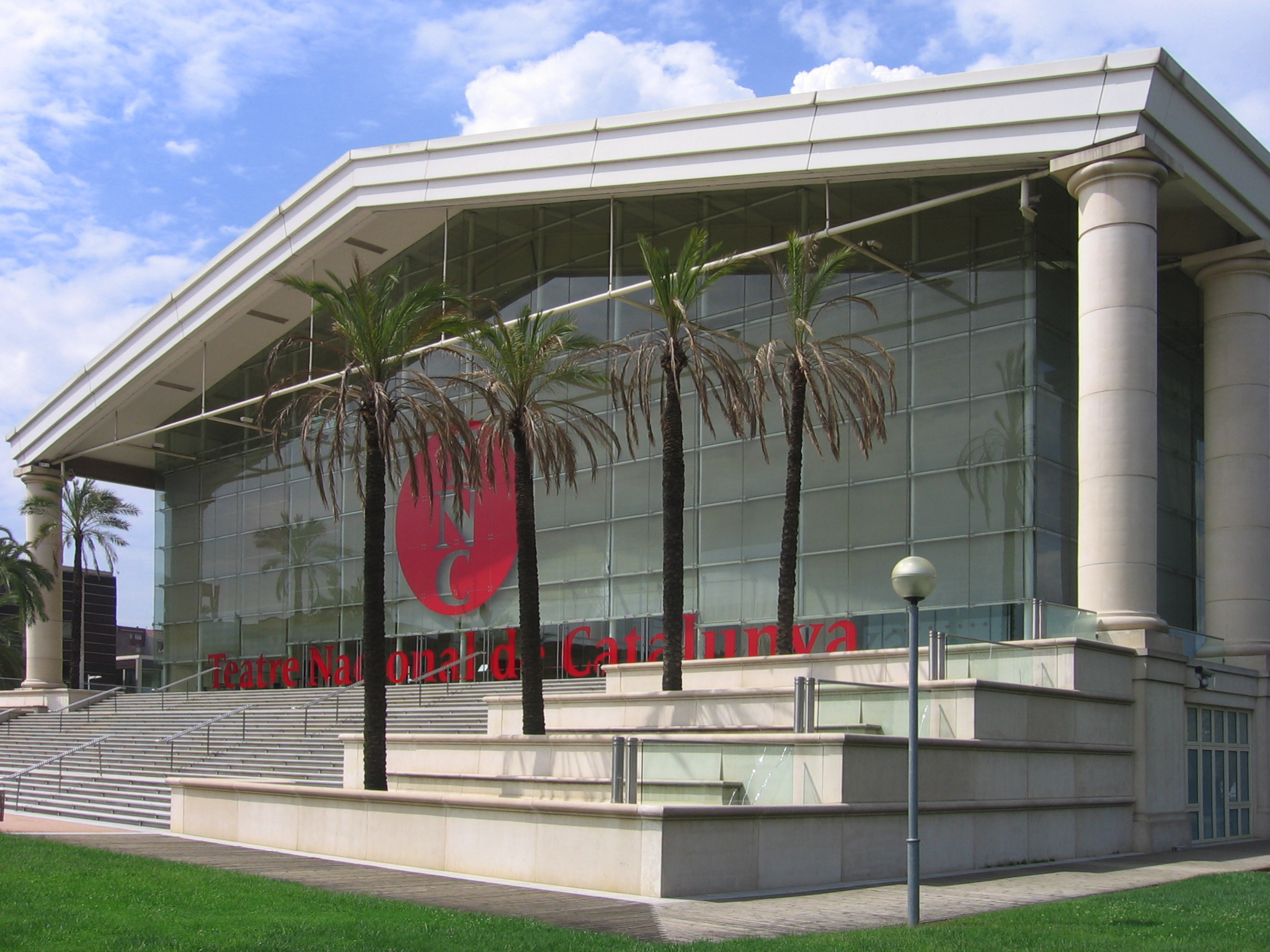
Teatre Nacional de Catalunya, Barcelona (1996)

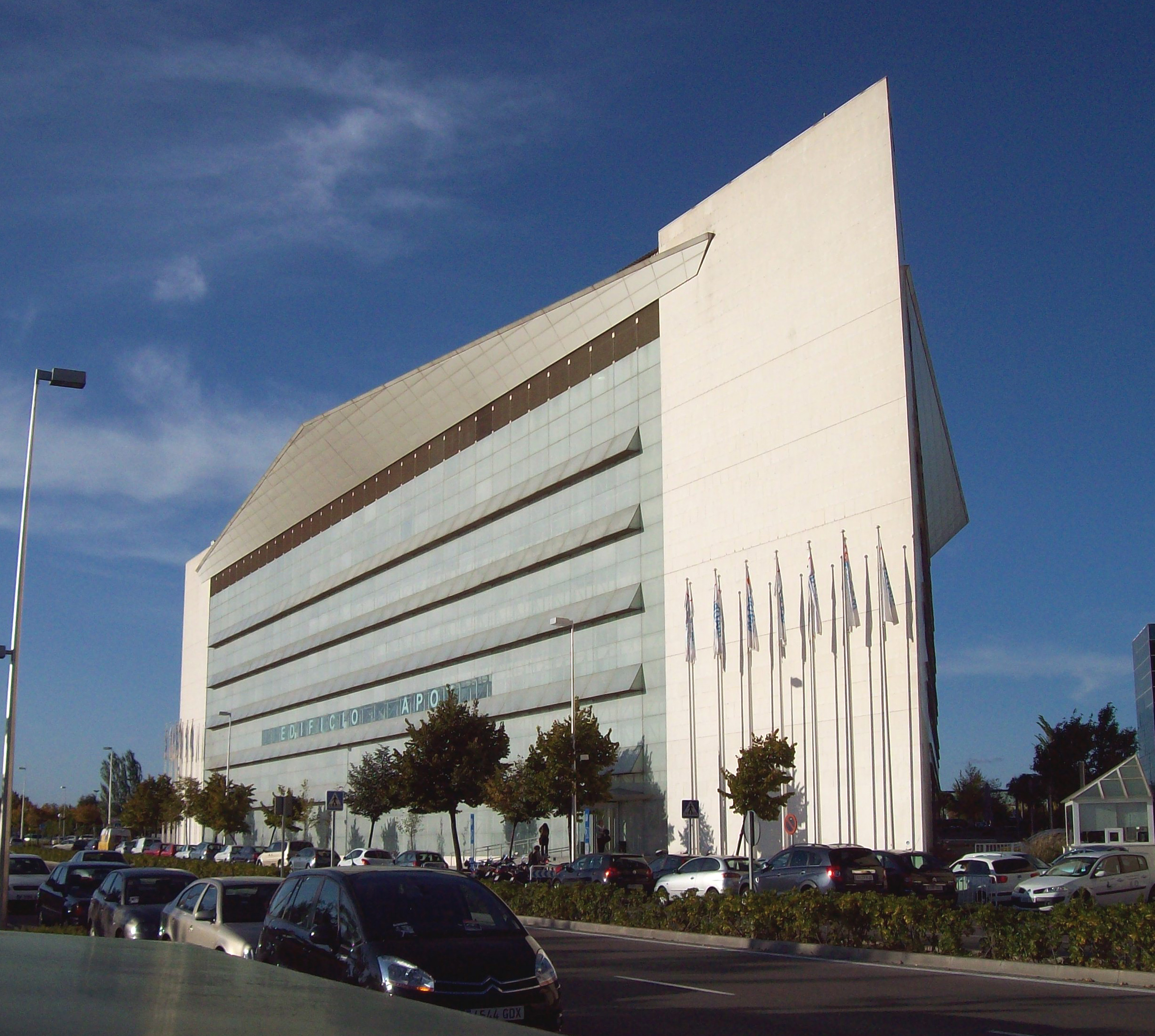
Apot Building, Madrid

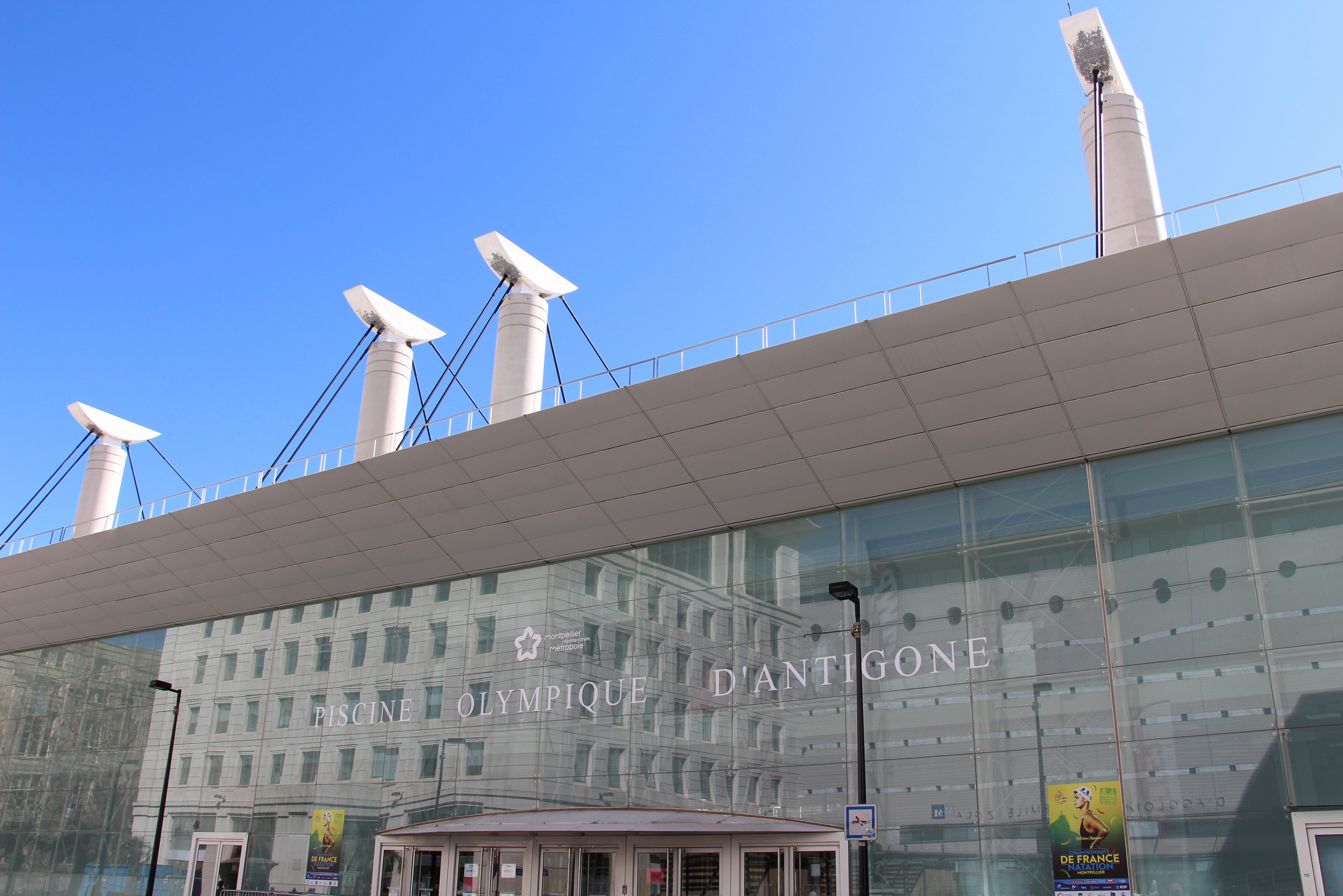
Olympic Swimming Pool, Montpellier (1999)

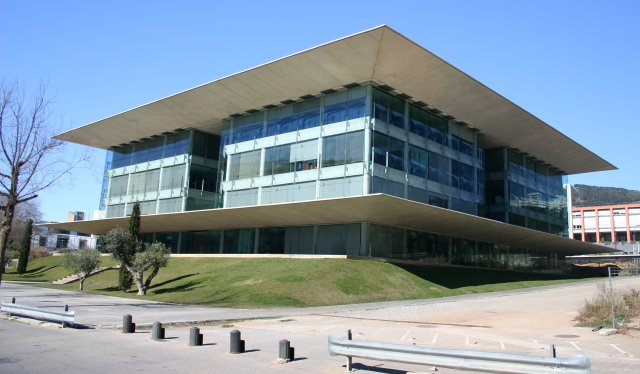
Nexus II building, UPC Campus Nord, Barcelona (2002)

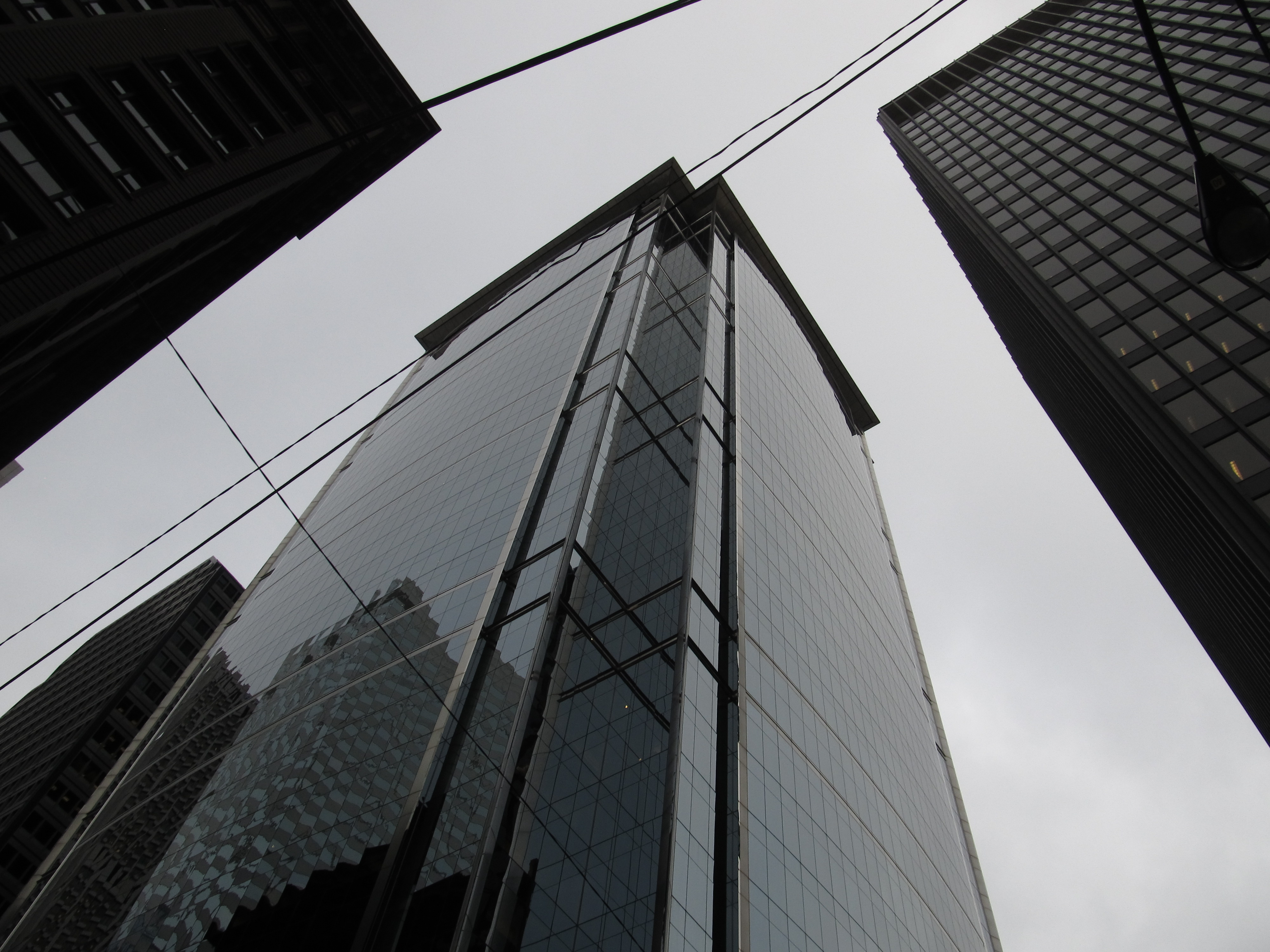
Citadel Center, Chicago (2003)

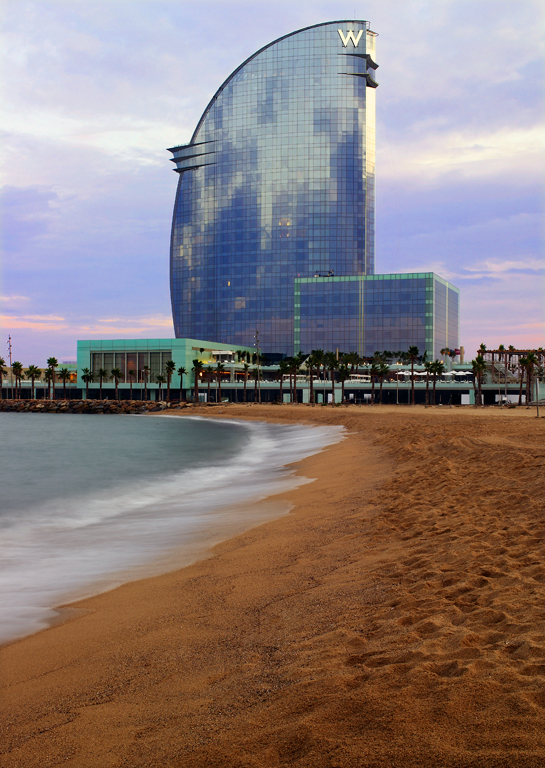
W Hotel Barcelona (2009)

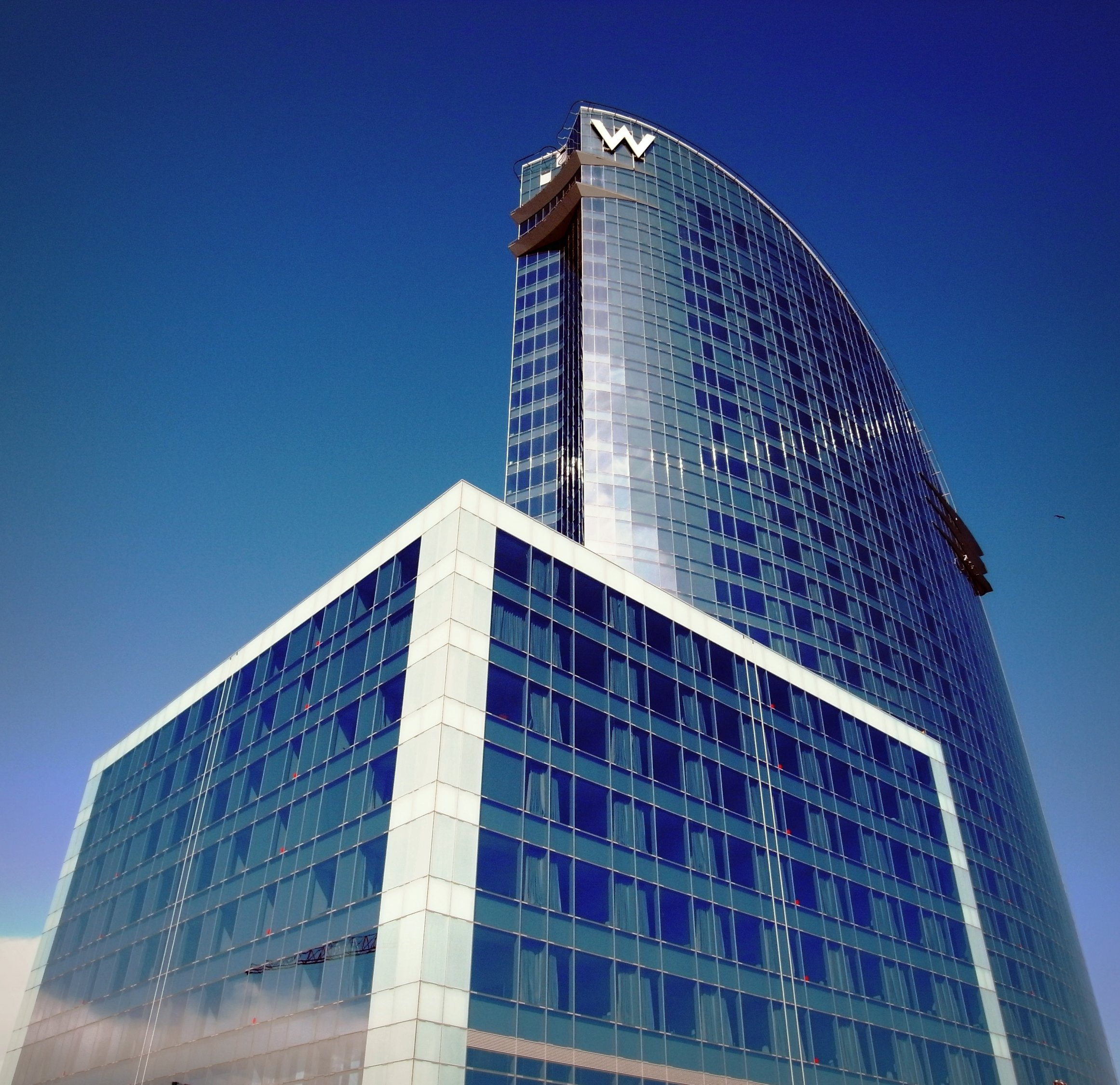
W Hotel

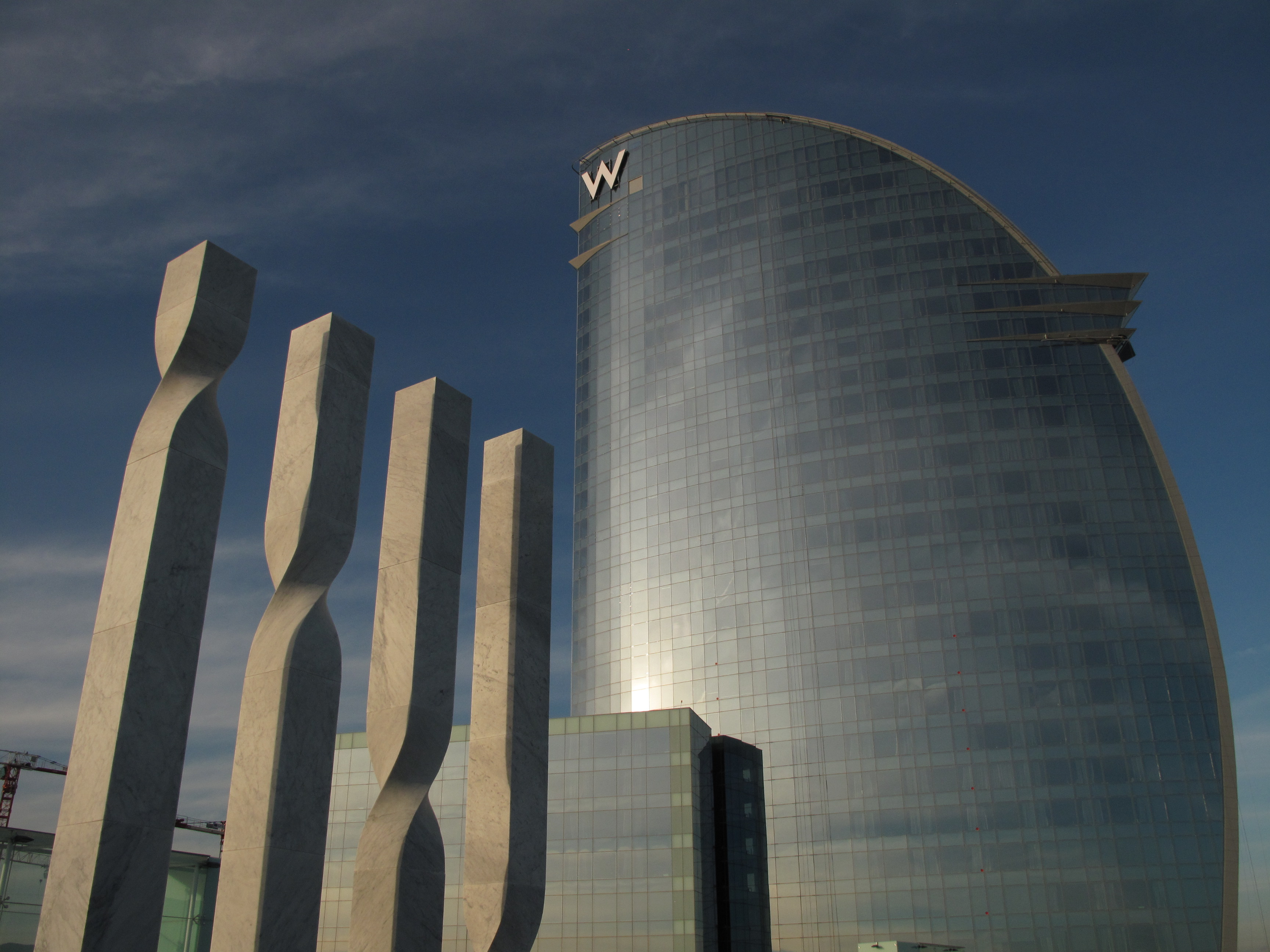
Hotel W and Quatre Barres monument

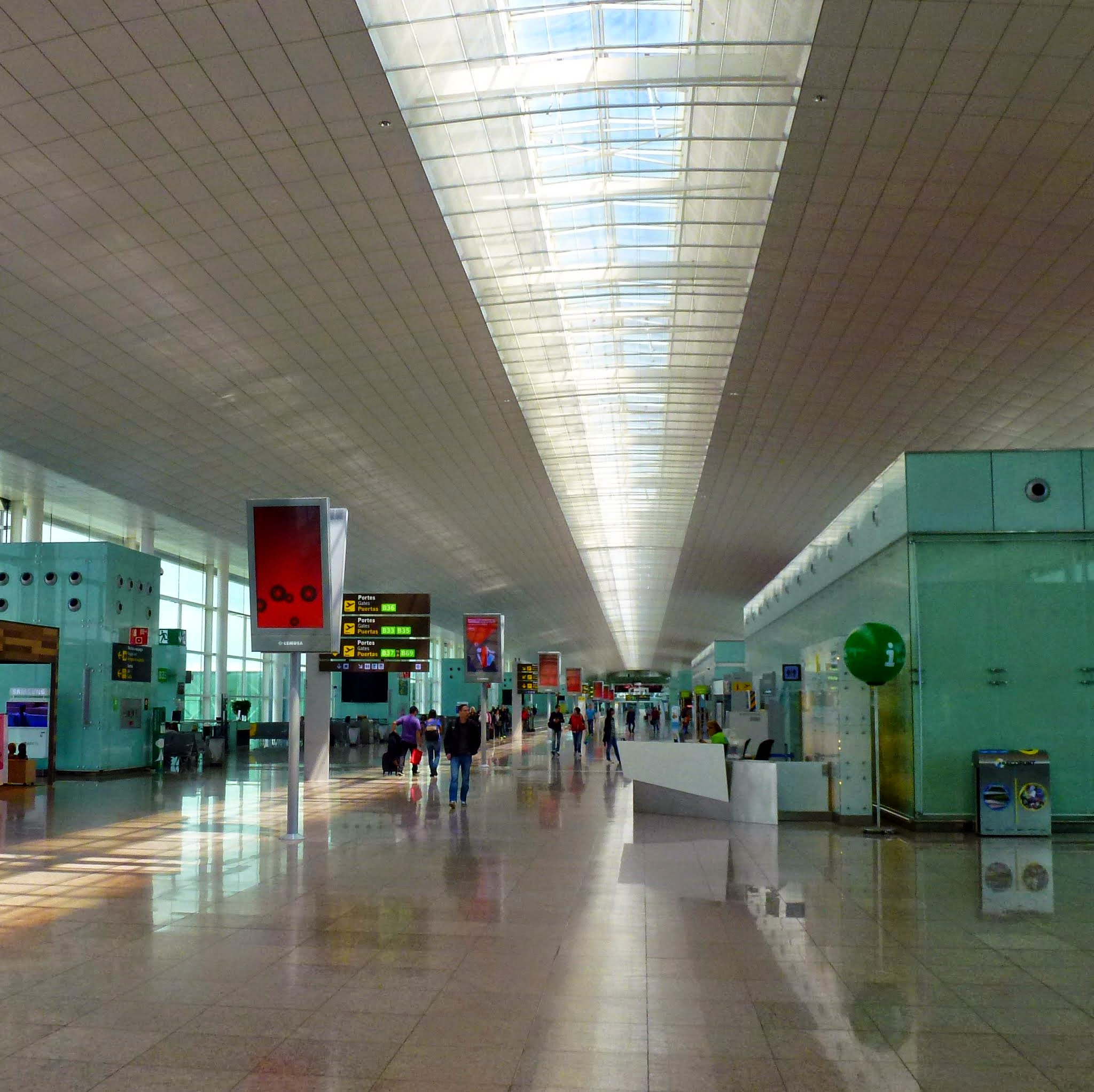
Barcelona Airport, Terminal 1 (2010)

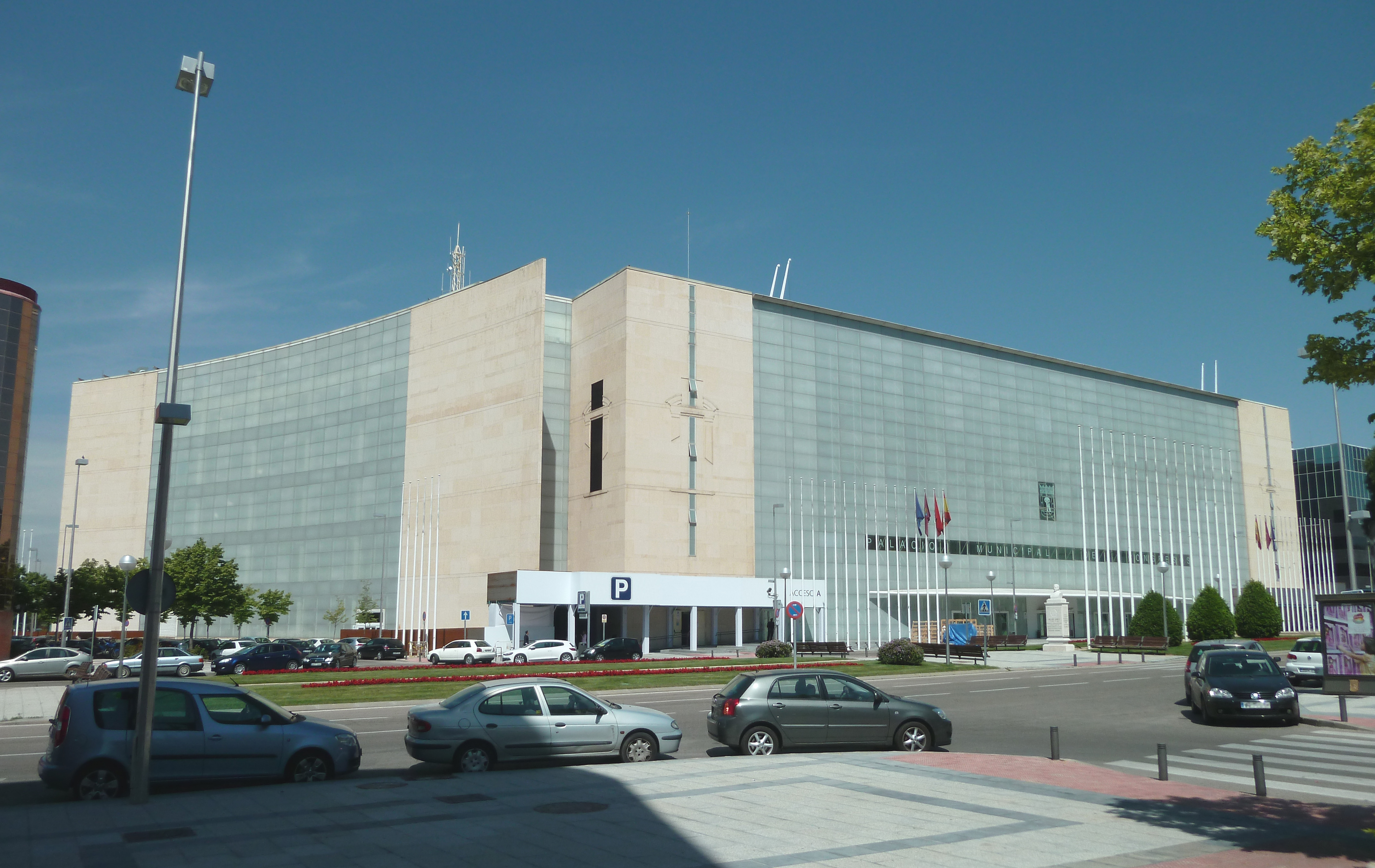
Palacio Municipal de Congresos, Madrid

== See also ==
- Vittorio Gregotti
- Léon Krier
- Aldo Rossi
- Moshe Safdie
- New Urbanism
- New Classical architecture
