= Marta de Vilallonga =

Spanish designer

Marta de Vilallonga (born 1960 in Barcelona) is a Spanish designer from Catalonia.

== Life and work ==
The daughter of painter Jesús Carles de Vilallonga and Madeleine Kirouac, she studied fashion design at Studio Berçot and industrial design at ESDI (Ecole Supérieure de Design Industriel), both in Paris. She then worked on sets and costumes for the French cinema industry. In 1988 and 1989, she worked at Richard Meier's workshop in New York City, on furniture and interior design projects. In 1990 she started working with architect Ricardo Bofill and his firm Ricardo Bofill Taller de Arquitectura (RBTA), and also became Bofill's long-term partner.

She has been in charge of most of RBTA's interior design work in the subsequent decades, including for projects such as Barcelona Airport, the National Institute of Physical Education of Catalonia, National Theatre of Catalonia, Madrid Convention Palace, and the remodeling of Bofill's home within his complex known as La Fábrica in Sant Just Desvern near Barcelona. She has also produced designs under her own name.

In 2020, she curated a show of paintings by her late father at the Espai Volart exhibition venue of Fundació Vila Casas in Barcelona, titled Vilallonga: The Inner Eye (Catalan: Vilallonga, l'ull interior).

== See also ==
- List of works by Ricardo Bofill Taller de Arquitectura
