= Fabbrica =

Fabbrica may refer to:

- Fabbrica Curone, a comune in the Province of Alessandria, Piedmont, Italy
- Fabbrica, Peccioli, a village in the province of Pisa, Italy
- Fabbrica Aeroplani Ing. O. Pomilio, an Italian World War I biplane aircraft manufacturer
- Fabbrica Italiana Automobili Torino
- Veneranda Fabbrica del Duomo di Milano, an organization established to supervise construction of the Cathedral of Milan
- Fabbrica d'Armi Pietro Beretta; see Beretta

== See also ==
- Fabrica (disambiguation)
