= Fab =

Fab or FAB may refer to:

== Commerce ==
- Fab (brand), a frozen confectionery
- Fab (website), an e-commerce design web site
- Fab, a digital asset marketplace by Epic Games
- The FAB Awards, a food and beverage award
- FAB Link, a European electricity link
- FabSwingers, a social network for swingers
- Flavoured alcoholic beverage or alcopop, alcoholic drinks with circa 3–7% alcohol
- First Abu Dhabi Bank, an Emirati bank
- Semiconductor fabrication plant, a factory that manufactures integrated circuits, etc.
- Flesh and Blood (card game), a fantasy card game (TCG).

== Culture ==
- Fab!, an Irish girl group active in the late 1990s
- fab (magazine), a Canadian gay magazine
- "FAB" (song), a song by JoJo featuring Remy Ma from the 2016 album Mad Love
- Fernsehen aus Berlin, a German television station
- Film Advisory Board, an American ratings board
- Fullmetal Alchemist Brotherhood, a Japanese anime

== Health and medicine ==
- Fragment antigen-binding
- French–American–British classification systems for hematological disease
- Frontal Assessment Battery for the evaluation of executive function

== Military ==
- Benin Armed Forces (French: Forces armées béninoises)
- Brazilian Air Force (Portuguese: Força Aérea Brasileira)
- Brazilian Armed Forces (Portuguese: Forças Armadas Brasileiras)
- Bolivian Air Force (Spanish: Fuerza Aérea Boliviana)
- Russian acronym for general-purpose bombs such as FAB-250 or FAB-500

== People ==
- Georgie Fab (born 1952), Canadian musician
- Joe Fab (born 1951), American film producer
- Mistah F.A.B. (born 1982), American rapper

=== Given name ===
- Fab Filippo (born 1974), Canadian actor
- Fab Melo (1990–2017), Brazilian basketball player
- Fabrizio Moretti (born 1980), drummer in The Strokes
- Fab Morvan (born 1966), French singer; member of Milli Vanilli

== Science and technology ==
- Fab (semiconductors), a factory where integrated circuits are fabricated
- Fading affect bias
- Fast atom bombardment
- Feminist Approaches to Bioethics
- Fly ash brick
- Floating Action Button, a UI component of Google's Material Design
- Fragment antigen-binding

== Sport ==
- Angolan Basketball Federation (Portuguese: Federação Angolana de Basquetebol)
- Argentina Boxing Federation (Spanish: Federación Argentina de Boxeo)
- Bolivian Athletics Federation (Spanish: Federación Atlética de Bolivia)

== Transport ==
- First Air, a Canadian airline
- Farnborough Airport in Hampshire, England
- Functional airspace block in the European Union

== Other uses ==
- Annobonese Creole language of Equatorial Guinea, ISO 639-3 code
- Freeport Area of Bataan (FAB), formerly Free Trade Zone (FTZ), and Bataan Export Processing Zone (BEPZ) or Bataan Economic Zone (BEZ) from June 21, 1969 to July 2010, Mariveles, Bataan, Philippines
- Cars in the 1960s British science-fiction television series Thunderbirds; see FAB 1

== See also ==
- Fab Four (disambiguation)
- Fabrication (disambiguation)
- Fabulous (disambiguation)
