= Anna Bofill Leví =

Spanish composer (born 1944)

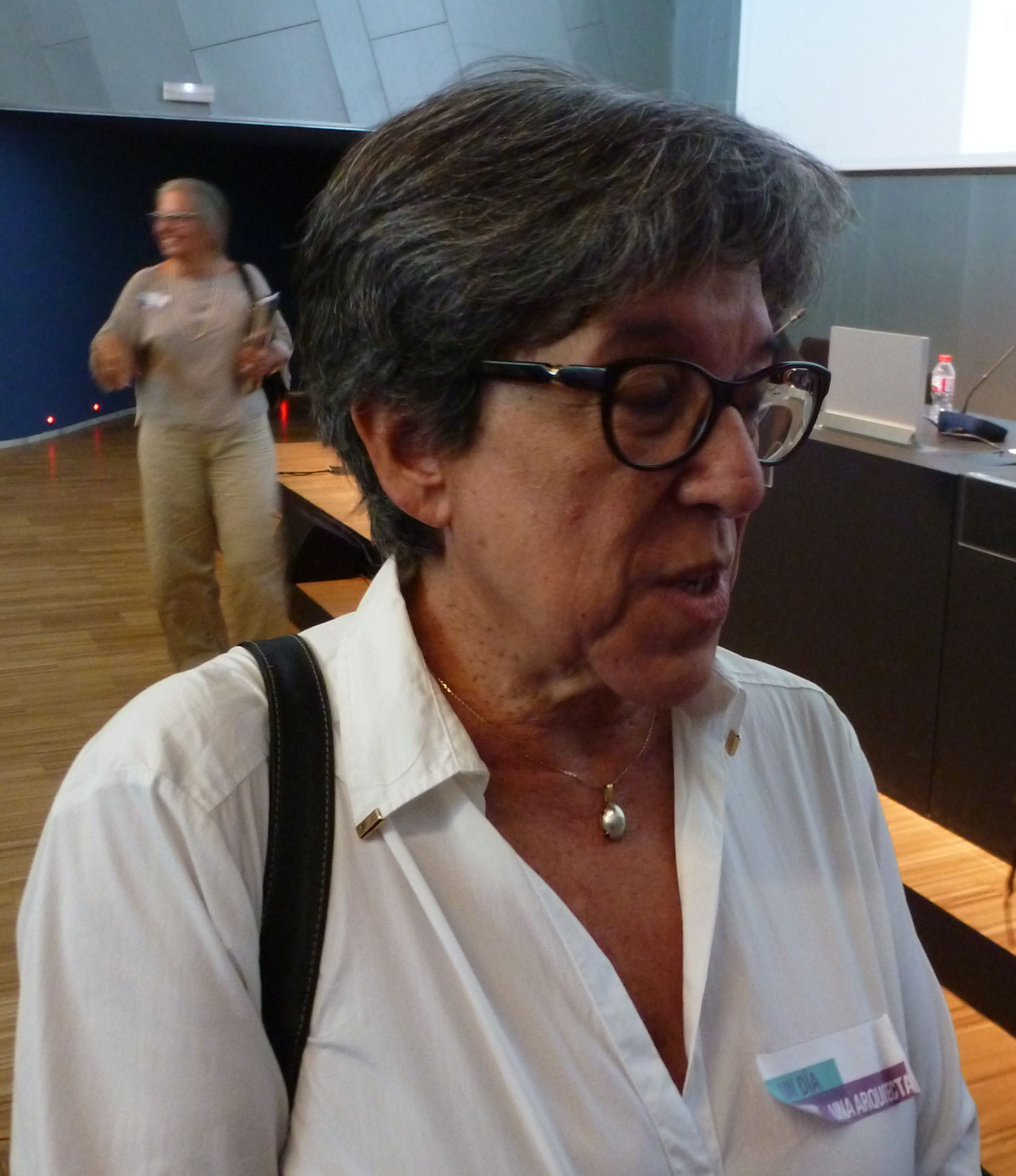
- Born: Anna Bofill Leví; 25 April 1944 (age 82); Barcelona, Catalonia, Spain
- Occupations: Music and architect
- Spouse: María Cinta Montagut

Anna Bofill Leví (Catalan pronunciation: [ˈanːə βuˈfiʎ ləˈβi]; born 25 April 1944 in Barcelona) is a Catalan Spanish pianist, architect and composer.

== Life ==
Anna Bofill Leví was born on 25 April 1944 in Barcelona, Spain, daughter of Catalan Emilio Bofill y Benessat, and Maria Levi, a Venetian of Jewish origin. Her brother was architect Ricardo Bofill. She has two daughters and is married to María Cinta Montagut, a Spanish female writer.

She studied piano and music theory with Jordi Albareda, Xavier Montsalvatge, Josep Cercós and Josep Mestres Quadreny. She also graduated with a PhD in architecture from the Barcelona School of Architecture. From 1963 she participated in the early development of Ricardo Bofill Taller de Arquitectura (RBTA), the multidisciplinary architecture firm led by her elder brother Ricardo Bofill. She left RBTA in 1981.

Bofill continued her studies in electroacoustic music with Gabriel Luis and Callejo Brncic and computer music with Xavier Serra and Sergi Jordi at the Phonos Laboratory in Barcelona. In 1982 she attended the Conference of New Music in Sitges and took courses at the Miró Foundation with Luigi Nono, Joan Guinjoan, and Coriúnn Aharonián. In 1985 she worked at the Centre d'Études de Mathémathique et Automates Musicales (CEMAMU) in Paris, directed by Iannis Xenakis. In 1983 she translated Iannis Xenakis' book Musique, architecture (Music and architecture) into Catalan.

Bofill has also designed sets for theater and composed music for theater works by Ricard Salvat and Mark Medoff, and other incidental music. She has collaborated with director Magda Puyo Pepe Duran, and writes professional articles. In 2009 she was honored with the President Macià Work Medal from the Generalitat de Catalunya.

== Works ==
Bofill has written works for solo instruments, voice, chamber music and electroacoustic performance. Selected works include:

- Esclat (1971)
- Poema per pianoforte (1974)

She has published the texts:

- Bofill Anna. Generation of Forms : Space to Inhabit Time to Think = Künstlerische Formgebung : Raum Zum Wohnen Zeit Für Reflexion. Berlin: Deutscher Kunstverlag, 2009.
- Bofill, Anna. Los sonidos del silencio. Aproximación a la historia de la creación musical de las mujeres. Madrid: Aresta Editorial, 2015.https://www.elargonauta.com/libros/los-sonidos-del-silencio-aproximacion-a-la-historia-de-la-creacion-musical-de-las-mujeres/978-84-943668-0-2/
