= Fabrica =

Fabrica means a device in Latin, and derivative words mean "factory" in French (fabrique), Italian (fabbrica), Portuguese (fábrica), Romanian (fabrica) and Spanish (fábrica) among other Romance languages. It may also refer to:

- Fabrica, Sagay, a neighborhood of the city of Sagay, Negros Occidental in the Philippines
- Fabrica research centre, a communications research centre in Italy, part of the Benetton Group
- La Fábrica (Real Madrid), the player development center of Real Madrid CF in Spain
- La Fábrica (Sant Just Desvern), a converted former cement plant that is now headquarters of Ricardo Bofill Taller de Arquitectiura near Barcelona
- Fabrica, a village in Gârbou, Sălaj County, Romania
- Fabrica Records, an independent music label
