= Fabricator =

Fabricator may refer to:

== Manufacturing ==
- Manufacturer
  - Digital fabricator, a device designed to make (almost) anything
  - Surface fabricator, a person or device that transforms one surface into another, or constructs a surface

== Other uses ==
- Fabricator (intelligence), a source agent that provides fraudulent or false information
  - Fabricator notice, by an intelligence agency
- Fabricator (album), BWO's third studio album, 2007

== See also ==
- Fabrication (disambiguation)
- Phabricator, software development collaboration tools
