= Fabrication =

Fabrication may refer to:

- Manufacturing, specifically the crafting of individual parts as a solo product or as part of a larger combined product.

== Processes in arts, crafts and manufacturing ==
- Semiconductor device fabrication, the process used to create semiconductor devices and integrated circuits in everyday electronic devices
- Art fabrication, production of large or technically difficult artworks
- Metal fabrication, the building of metal structures by cutting, bending, and assembling
- Prefabrication, assembling components of a structure and transporting them to the site where the structure is to be located

== Falsehoods ==
- Fabrication (lie), a type of lie
- Fabrication (science), a form of scientific misconduct
- Fabricator (intelligence), a source agent or officer that produces fraudulent or false information
- Fable, a literary genre
- Fiction

== See also ==
- Fabricator (disambiguation)
- Fab (disambiguation)
- Fabric (disambiguation)
- Fabrication (optics)
