= Fabric (Cowell) =

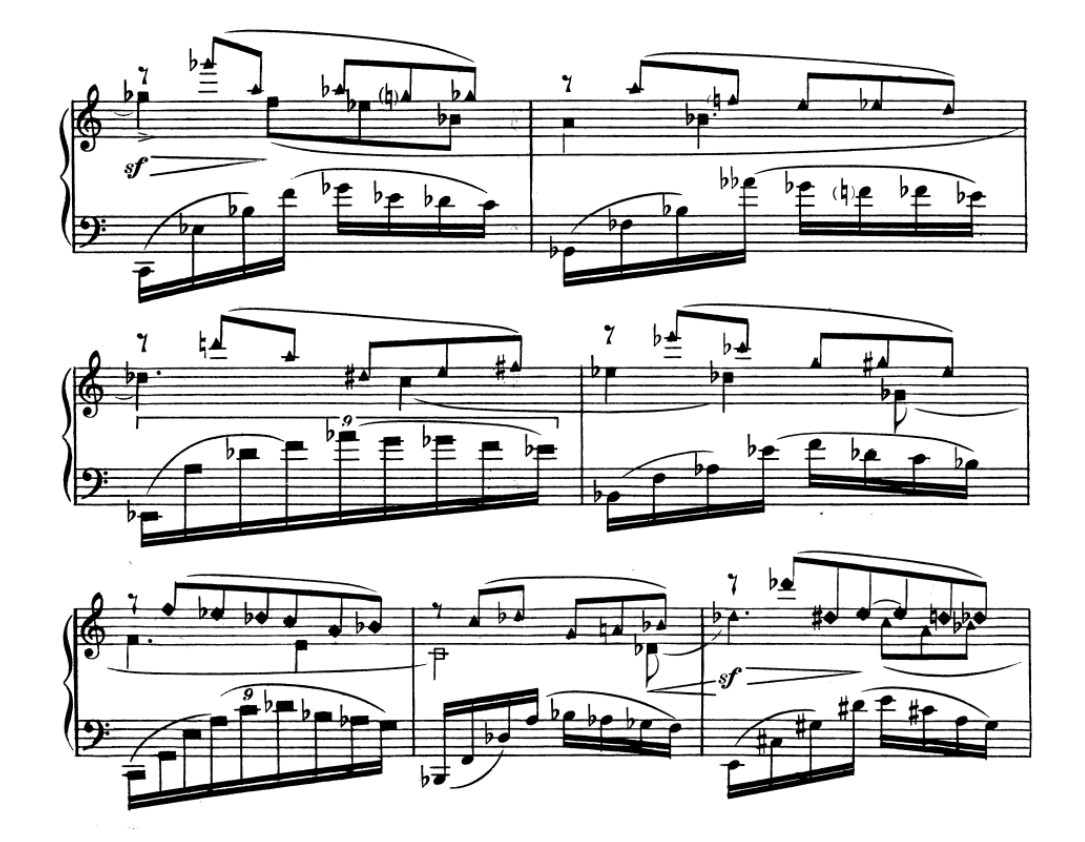
Bars 3-9 of the piece, showing different shaped note heads for each rhythmic subdivision

Henry Cowell's 1920 work Fabric, HC 307, is a short piano piece meant to be an exercise in a form of experimental rhythmic notation he had been developing at the time.

== Background ==
It was written in the month of September 1922, with the complexity resulting from Cowell's preoccupation with rhythmic exploration and polyrhythmic tendencies. The piece is dedicated to Georgia Kober.
