= 77 West Wacker Drive =

Office skyscraper in Chicago, Illinois

Coordinates: 41°53′11.40″N 87°37′49.90″W

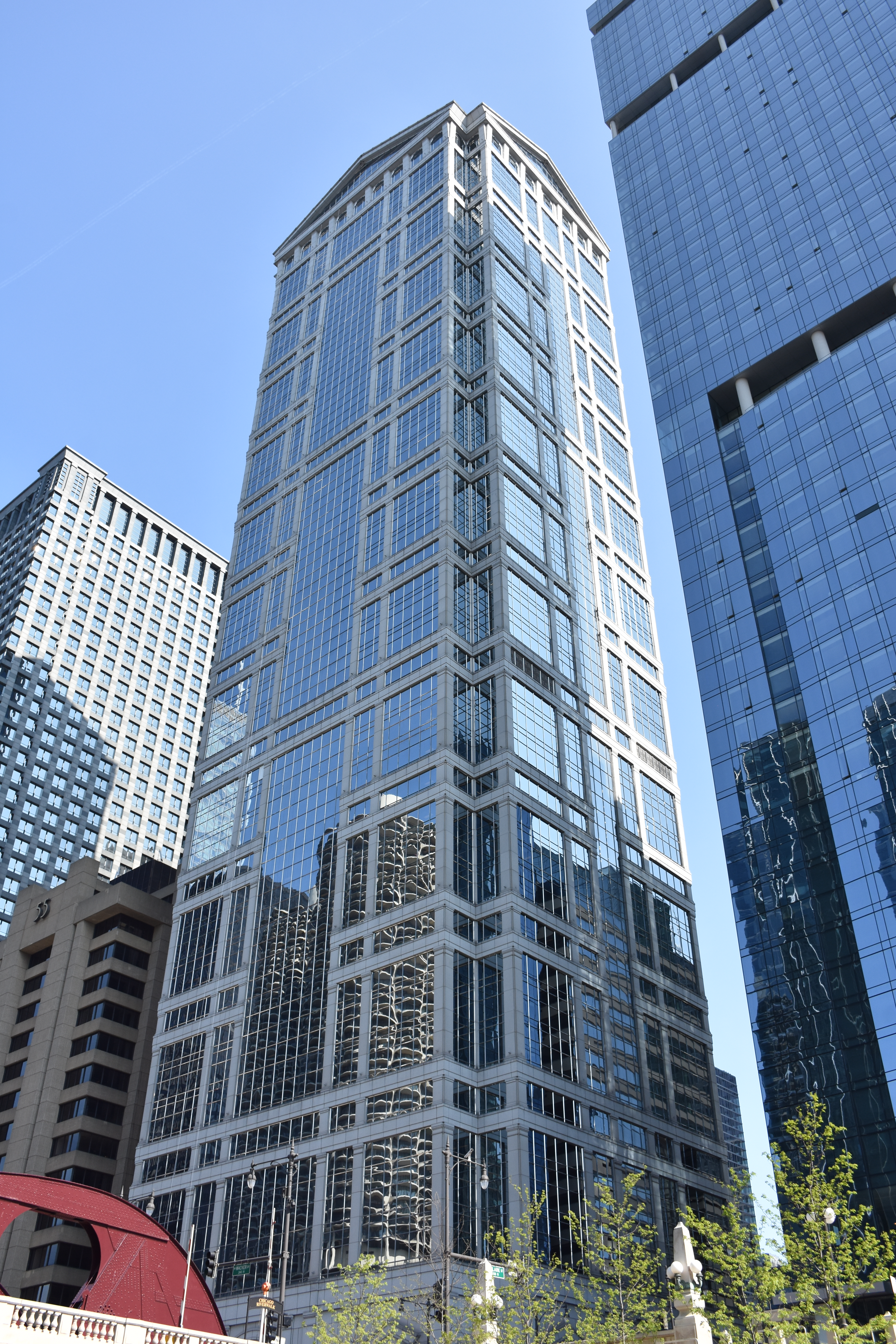

General information
- Status: Completed
- Type: Office
- Construction started: 1990
- Completed: 1992

Height
- Roof: 668 ft (204 m)

Technical details
- Floor count: 51
- Floor area: 1,039,987 sq ft (96,618.0 m^{2})
- Lifts/elevators: 25

Design and construction
- Architect: Ricardo Bofill Taller de Arquitectura
- Developer: Prime Group Realty Trust
- Structural engineer: Cohen-Barreto-Marchertas
- Main contractor: Schal Associates, Inc.

77 West Wacker Drive is an office skyscraper in the Chicago Loop in Chicago, Illinois. Completed in 1992, the 51-story building rises to 668 feet (204 m) and contains approximately 944,000 sq ft (87,700 m^{2}) of interior space. It was designed by Bofill Taller de Arquitectura.

The building was originally known as the RR Donnelley Building, reflecting its primary tenant, RR Donnelley. The company relocated its corporate headquarters in May 2005, and in 2007 the building was renamed the United Building after United Airlines moved its corporate headquarters there from suburban Chicago. In 2012, United relocated its headquarters to the Willis Tower.

In August 2014, Archer Daniels Midland moved its corporate headquarters to 77 West Wacker Drive from Decatur, Illinois.

== History ==
By 1990, Keck, Mahin & Cate, a then-prominent Chicago-based law firm, considered moving out of its space in the Sears Tower and moving into a potential new development, which would become 77 West Wacker Drive. Brokers who were familiar with the lease negotiations stated that Sears was trying to keep Keck, Mahin & Cate in the building. Keck, Mahin & Cate decided to move into 77 West Wacker, and the Prime Group, developer of 77 West Wacker, finalized the development of the facility. In 1991, RR Donnelley leased 215,000 square feet (20,000 m^{2}) on floors 9 through 19 for its world headquarters, and Kemper Securities leased 150,000 square feet (14,000 m^{2}).

With the lease deals concluded, 77 West Wacker had 86% of its tenant space occupied. Jerry C. Davis of the Chicago Sun-Times said that the remaining space would be too small for some prospective tenants. Davis added that the leases to RR Donnelley and Kemper significantly altered "the complexion of the downtown office market." Keck, Mahin & Cate moved from the Sears Tower to 77 West Wacker in mid-1992; the firm suffered a series of practice group defections and questionable management decisions, and ultimately ceased operation in 1997.

In 2004, RR Donnelley signed a letter of intent to move out of 77 West Wacker. During the same year, McGuireWoods extended its lease by 8 years, changing the end date from December 31, 2010 to December 31, 2018. In addition, McGuireWoods expanded its leased space, effective February 1, 2004. The company gained an extra 65,756 square feet (6,108.9 m^{2}) of space in addition to its existing 67,819 square feet (6,300.6 m^{2}). As a result of the lease expansion of McGuireWoods, as of February 2004, 77 West Wacker was 92.2% leased. In 2004, the lease of the firm Jones Day of 138,764 square feet (12,891.6 m^{2}) in 77 West Wacker was extended by 15 years, with the end date changed from September 30, 2007 to September 30, 2022. In 2006, Microsoft extended the term of its lease and expanded its leased space to 12,391 square feet (1,151.2 m^{2}), with a total of 47,122 square feet (4,377.8 m^{2}) occupied by Microsoft. During the same year, Greenberg Traurig agreed to expand its lease by 22,565 square feet (2,096.4 m^{2}), giving it a total of 100,975 square feet (9,380.9 m^{2}).

In 2006, United Airlines agreed to move its 350 executives and some staff members from its Elk Grove Township campus to 77 West Wacker.

On August 13, 2012, United Continental Holdings announced its intention to once again relocate its world headquarters. An agreement was reached for United Continental Holdings to lease an additional 200,000 square feet (19,000 m^{2}) at Chicago's Willis Tower, joining the airline's operations center which leased an initial 470,000 square feet (44,000 m^{2}) in 2010. The company vacated the majority of their offices at 77 West Wacker with the naming future of the building left unknown.

== Design ==
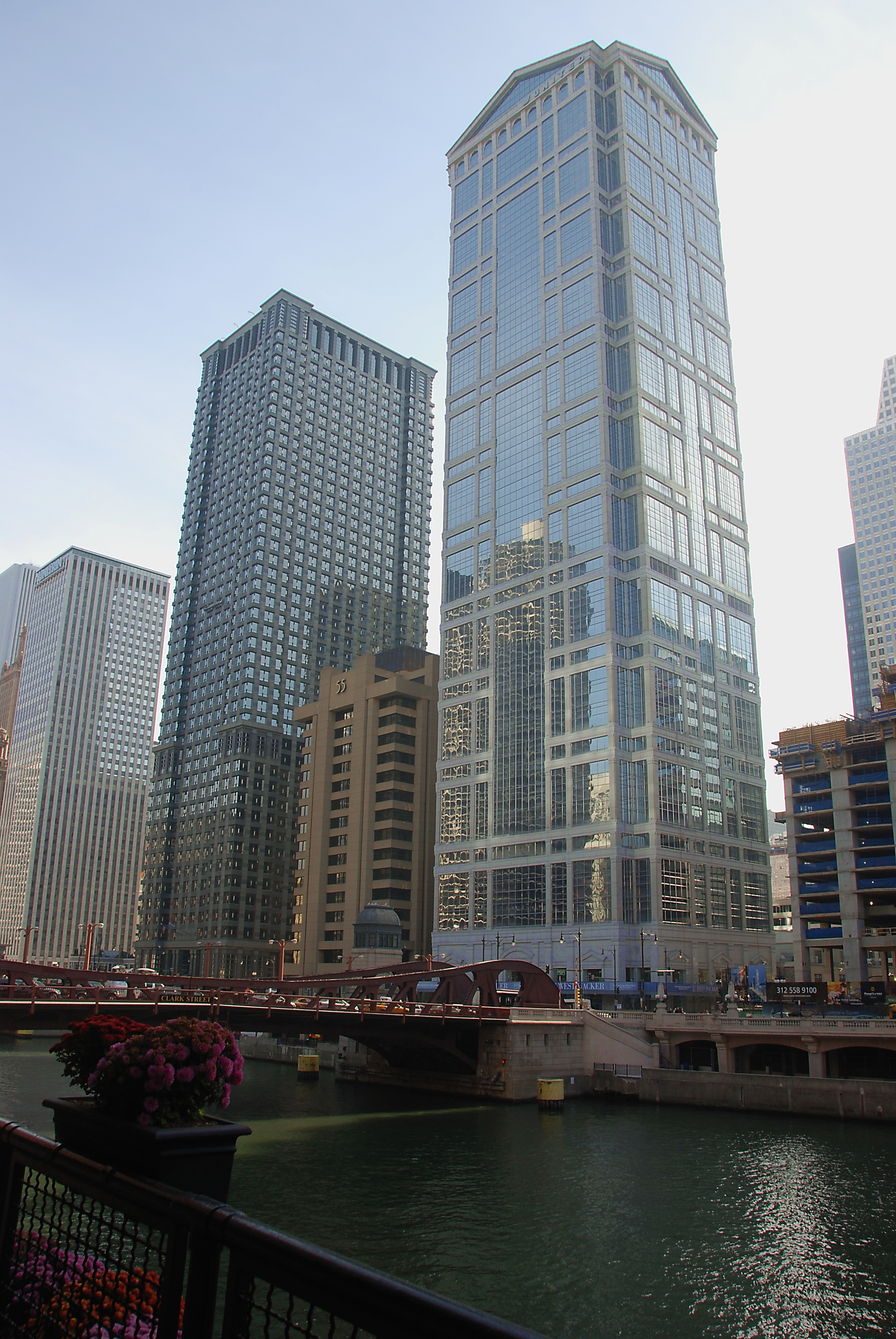
77 West Wacker is shown in context between the Leo Burnett Building and the partially constructed Waterview Tower.

77 West Wacker is one of the most prominent examples of postmodern architecture in the city of Chicago. The facade consists of glass surfaces framed in Portuguese white granite, with the dividers between the different floors linked by columns. The top floor is shaped like a Greek pediment. The ground floor houses a 59-foot-high (18 m) atrium in gray and white marble. To enhance its panoramic view over the city, the building's skin is predominantly glazed.

The interior is similarly styled. The classical Greek style is repeated inside, with Thassos marble walls and a 40 ft (12 m) tall coffered ceiling made of white oak wood.

A sculpture by Xavier Corberó called "Three Lawyers and A Judge" graces the building, as does Antoni Tàpies' artwork called "Big Eyelids". Bofill further contributed by creating a sculpture entitled "Twisted Columns" which appears to float above a reflecting pool. At night, 540 lamps light the building and its surroundings.

Steve Baron, president of Prime Group Realty, said in 1990 that 77 West Wacker had "very compact floors with virtually no columns." Therefore, tenant companies would not pay for space that they would be unable to use.

== Transportation ==
Chicago Transit Authority (CTA) bus lines serving the building include 22, 24, 29, 62, 124, 146 and 151. The closest Chicago 'L' stations are Clark/Lake, serving the Orange, Green, Blue, Purple, Pink and Brown Lines, and the State/Lake station, which serves the Orange, Green, Purple, Pink and Brown Lines, with a connection to the Red Line at Lake. The Metra Electric Line is the closest Metra line.

== Position in skyline ==
In this lakefront view from 2006, 77 West Wacker is located between Buckingham Fountain and the Pittsfield Building.

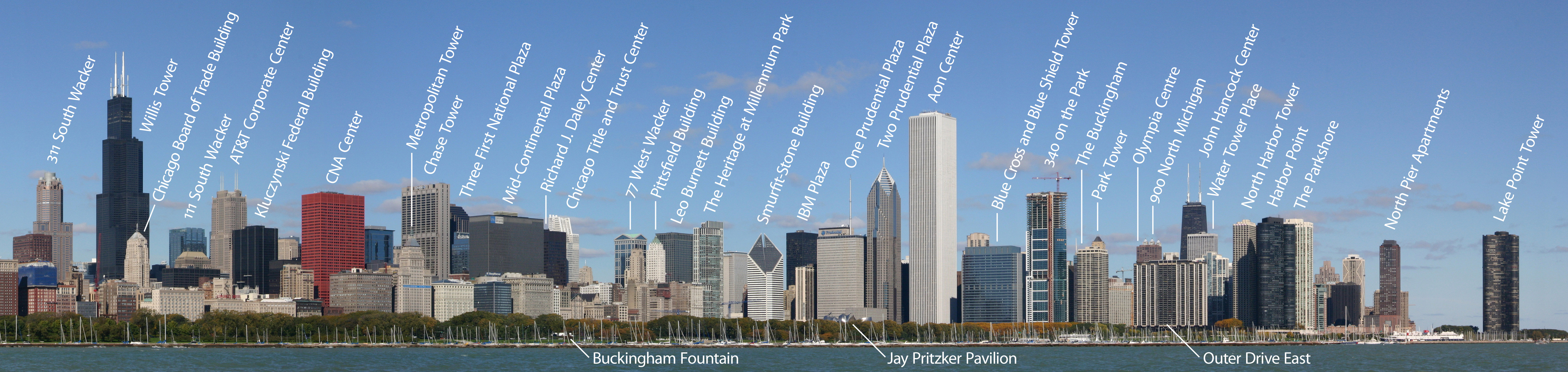

== See also ==
- List of tallest buildings in Chicago
- List of works by Ricardo Bofill Taller de Arquitectura
