= Fabrica Records =

Fabrica Records is a Brooklyn based independent record label, started in 2010 by Joao Da Silva of Redencion 911, which releases limited edition cassettes, vinyl records and compact discs by experimental music, contemporary, drone (music), and noise (music) musicians. Fabrica Records has released music by Insect Factory, Robert Turman, Rambutan, Lazurite, Hakobune, Derek Rogers, Unicorn, Public Speaking, The Tobacconists, among others.

== History ==
Joao Da Silva started Fabrica Records in 2010 out of his Gowanus, Brooklyn apartment, initially as a limited edition home-made cassette tape record label. Joao Da Silva had been part of the Santiago, Chile hardcore punk scene from 1995 until 2004 when he moved to Washington, DC. In Washington, Joao worked as a clerk at Smash! Records and helped the Amor y Lucha record label with distribution, advertising and sales. He has been experimenting with treated guitar and noise music since the 1990s. While in Washington he began recording solo guitar-based noise music under the name The Black Light Collective. In June 2008, Joao moved to Brooklyn, NY. Fabrica Records' first official release was "Life Passes Away Like Idle Chatter" a 44 minute home-made cassette tape of Joao Da Silva's new project called Luciernaga. "Life Passes..." was released in 2010 in an edition of one hundred copies, with hand-painted labels, most of which were traded over the mail with other noise musicians. In the next two years, Fabrica Records released cassettes for local Brooklyn artists STRNGLV, Adrian Varallyay, Earthmasters, Factions, Lazurite and others. In 2012, Fabrica Records began release vinyl records, the first two being Insect Factory's "Melodies From A Dead Radio" and a reissue on vinyl of Robert Turman's "Beyond Painting" album which had previously only been available on a limited edition CD-R. In 2013, "Beyond Painting" was included in many year end lists as one of the best reissue records of the year in British avant garde music magazine The Wire, AdHoc.fm, and the staff lists for New York's Other Music record store. Since 2010, Fabrica Records has continued to release limited edition cassettes, vinyl records and compact discs by U.S.-based and international experimental music artists.

== Partial roster of artists ==
- Luciernaga
- STRNGLV
- Adrian Varallyay
- Factions
- Earthmasters
- A Full Cosmic Sound
- Orbless
- Brizbomb
- Hakobune
- Derek Rogers
- Insect Factory
- Robert Turman
- Rambutan
- Public Speaking
- Culver
- KILT
- Parashi
- The Tobacconists
- Wolf Fluorescence
- Dane Patterson
- Letha Rodman Melchior
- Dan Melchior
- Aeronaut
