= Fabulous =

Fabulous may refer to:

- Fabulous (band), a 1990s British rock band
- Fabulous (album), by Sheena Easton, 2000
- Fabulous, an album by the Tamperer featuring Maya, 1999
- "Fabulous", a song by MEEK, 2002
- "Fabulous" (Charlie Gracie song), 1957
- "Fabulous" (Jaheim song), 2002
- "Fabulous" (High School Musical song), from the film High School Musical 2, 2007
- "Fabulous (Lover, Love Me)", a song by Amanda Lear, 1979
- Fabulous (film), a 2019 Canadian comedy-drama film
- Fabulous creature, another name for legendary creature
- Miss Fabulous International, a Thai-based beauty pageant

== See also ==
- Fabolous (born 1977), hip hop artist
- Fable
