= La Fábrica (Sant Just Desvern) =

Building in Sant Just Desvern, Spain

La Fábrica (Taller de Arcquitectura)
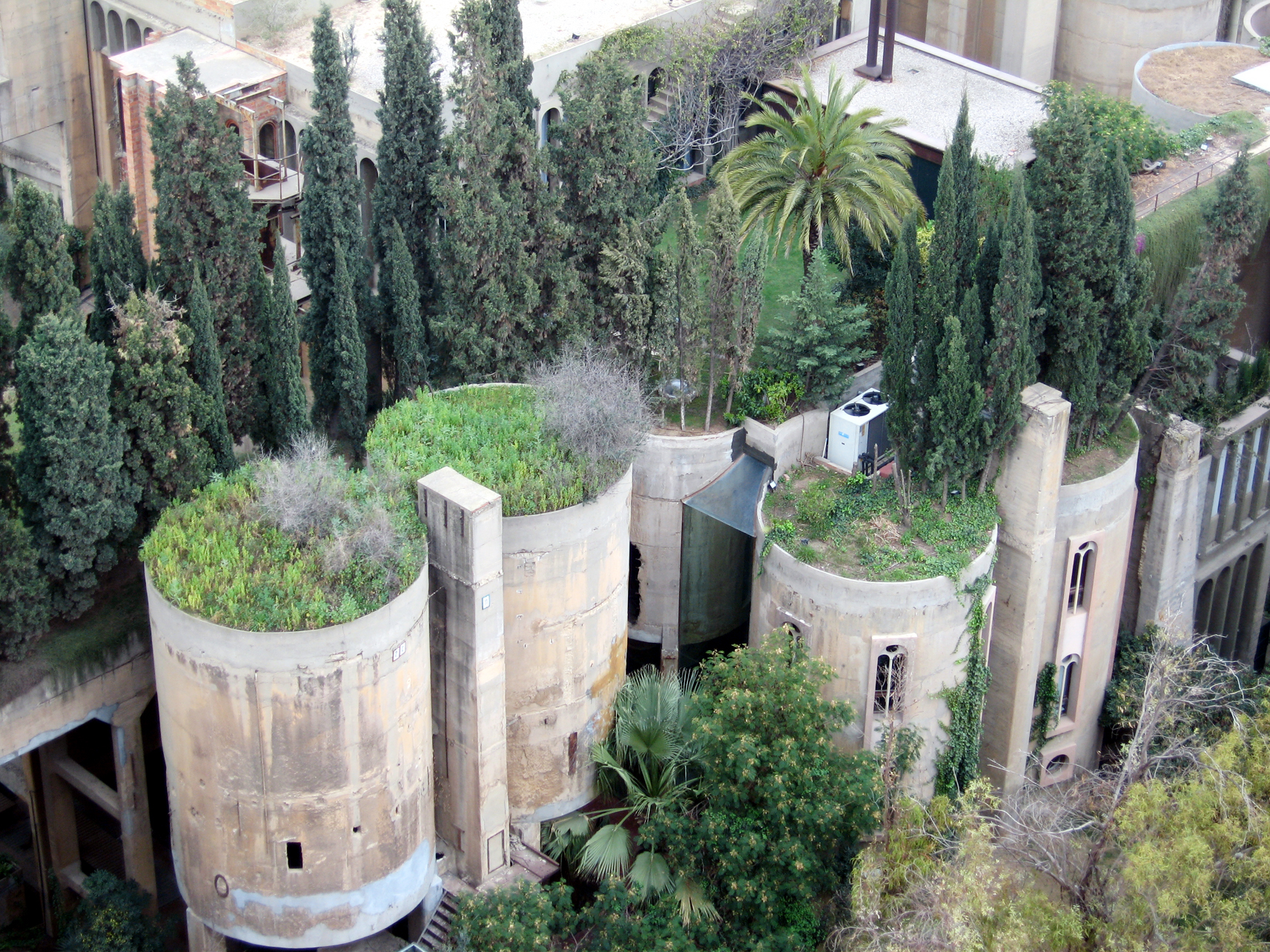
- Aerial view
- Location: Sant Just Desvern
- Coordinates: 41.3811°N 2.0685°E
- Designer: Ricardo Bofill Taller de Arquitectura
- Beginning date: 1973
- Opening date: 1975

La Fábrica is a former cement factory that was converted to offices and habitation space in the 1970s by Ricardo Bofill Taller de Arquitectura (RBTA). It is located in Sant Just Desvern near Barcelona.

== History ==
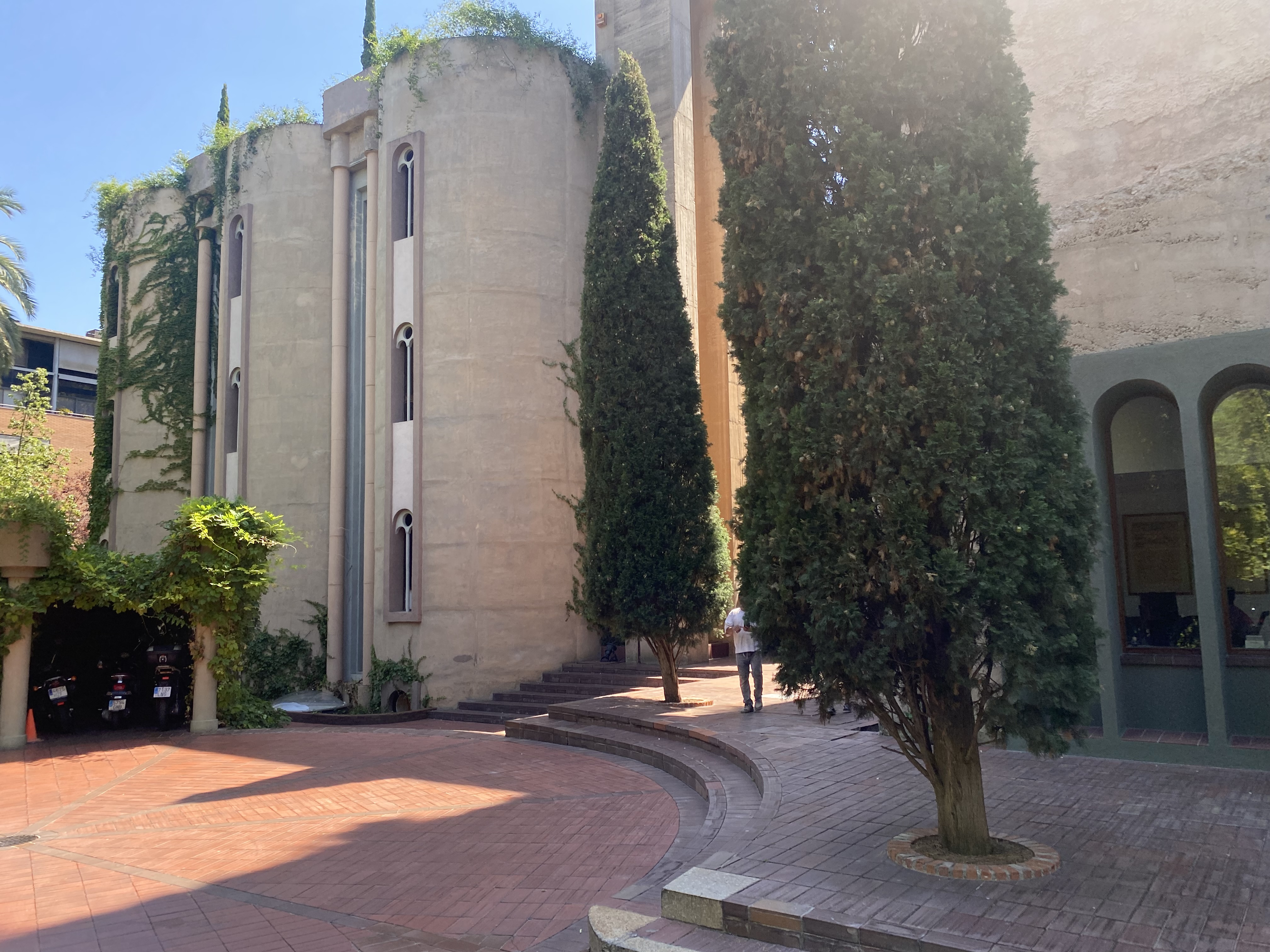
Entrance view

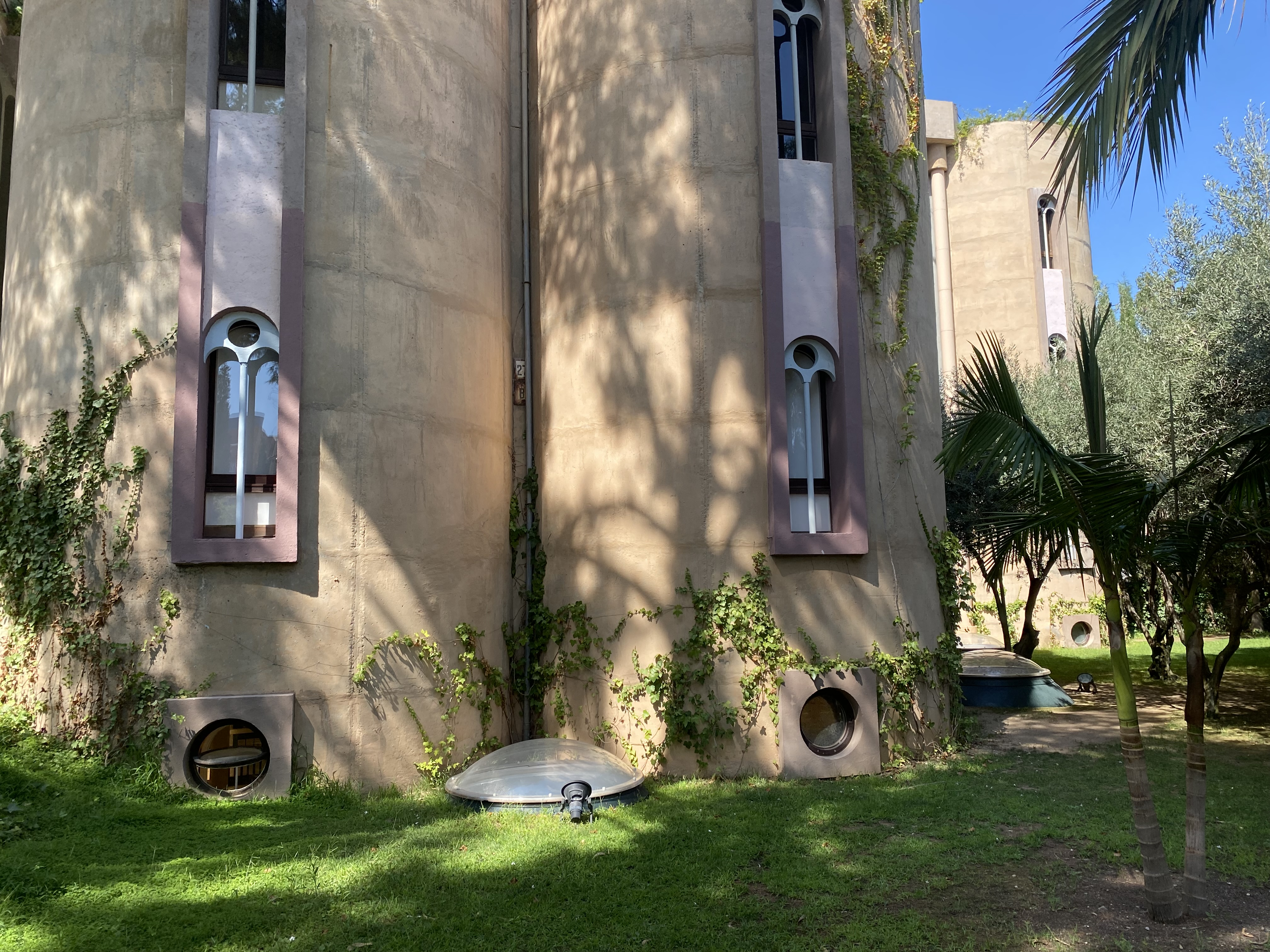
A view of La Fábrica

The cement company La Auxiliar de la Construcción S.A. (LACSA), which had its origins in the mountain village of Campins, was formed in 1916 or 1917 and built the original factory. It registered its "Sanson" trademark in 1920. The 105-meter-high chimney, designed by American engineer Clifford Tomlinson and the highest in Europe at the time, was completed in 1924. The factory went unharmed through the Spanish Civil War, during which it provided cement for fortifications work. It had its own railway line, connected with the network at Cornellà de Llobregat and completed in 1925, and employed 378 workers in the early 1950s. In the postwar period, the pollution it generated led to increasing neighborhood opposition to the new investment it needed. Eventually in 1968, Sanson moved its activity to a new cement production facility in nearby Sant Feliu de Llobregat, just under the Puig d'Olorda mountain and closer to the materials quarry at Santa Creu d'Olorda.

Ricardo Bofill and his Taller de Arquitectura spotted the site in 1972, purchased it in 1973 and initiated a process of partial destruction and reinvention, demolishing parts of the industrial structures to reveal hidden forms. The preserved silos were transformed into offices and residential areas. The project was mostly completed in 1975. Its design incorporates various architectural languages, including Catalan Gothic and surrealist elements, with echoes of both architectural postmodernism and critical regionalism.

On January 26 and 27, 2022, La Fábrica was opened to the public as a way to honor the memory of the recently deceased Ricardo Bofill. Thousands of visitors participated, coming from Sant Just Desvern, Barcelona, and beyond.

== Description ==
La Fábrica serves as headquarters of the Taller and as home for several of its architects, including Ricardo Bofill until his death on 14 January 2022. It includes offices, a model-making workshop, archives and a library. A large interior space dubbed "The Cathedral" is used for meetings, exhibitions, concerts, and other activities. Above the Cathedral lies Bofill's residence, including green roofs and terraces. The entire complex was planted with lush gardens, including some on rooftops, to create the feeling of an oasis within the surrounding industrial area. Whereas it is not ordinarily open to the public, it was the venue for a two-day event to celebrate Bofill's memory on January 26 and 27, 2022, in which thousands of visitors participated.

Next to it and adjacent to the Walden 7 apartments complex, also by RBTA, stands the tall chimney, which is not part of the Bofill-designed complex. This part of the former factory was redeveloped from 1984 by the Corporació Metropolitana de Barcelona and inaugurated in 1996. It currently includes a restaurant and observation point called El Mirador de Sant Just, as well as the Music Club Walden in renovated silos of the former factory. That project was initially designed by architect Alfred Arribas and completed by Joan Font.

== In popular culture ==
- La Fábrica appeared in an episode of MTV Cribs in 2002, featuring Paulina Rubio who gave a guided tour of the place, at a time when she was in a relationship with Ricardo Emilio Bofill.
- It features prominently as background set in the Spanish film Paradise Hills (2019), together with the nearby palatial house complex of Xavier Corberó in Esplugues de Llobregat.
- It is featured in HBO series Westworld, as part of the third season.

== See also ==
- Walden 7
- List of works by Ricardo Bofill Taller de Arquitectura
