= AMAC =

Amac or AMAC may also refer to:

== Organisations ==
- Arlington Memorial Amphitheater Commission, which oversaw the design and construction of Arlington Memorial Amphitheater in Arlington, Virginia, United States
- Asset Management Association of China, a Chinese association of fund management companies
- Association of Mature American Citizens, a U.S. political action committee
- Atlantic Mediterranean Activities Conference, a sports league in Europe

== Other uses ==
- Abuja Municipal Area Council, the official name of Abuja's local government
- Alternative macrophage activation-associated CC chemokine-1, the cytokine called CCL18
- A-MAC, carries digital information on an FM subcarrier
- Amac, the Hungarian name for Amaţi village, Păulești, Satu Mare, a commune in Romania
- Ammonium acetate, a commonly used buffer in mobile phases for HPLC
- Aston Martin Asia Cup, a racing series
- Australian Music Association Convention, a trade fair held by the Australian Music Association from 1999 to 2014
- Iver Johnson AMAC-1500, a rifle
