= Corberó =

Corberó is a surname. Notable people with the surname include:

- Ana Corberó (born 1961), Catalan artist, daughter of Xavier
- Úrsula Corberó (born 1989), Spanish actress
- Xavier Corberó (1935–2017), Catalan artist
