= Laken Riley Act =

2025 U.S. immigration law

- Long title: To require the Secretary of Homeland Security to take into custody aliens who have been charged in the United States with theft, and for other purposes.
- Announced in: the 119th United States Congress
- Number of co-sponsors: 53

Citations
- Public law: Pub. L. 119–1 (text) (PDF)

Codification
- Acts amended: Immigration and Nationality Act of 1952
- Titles amended: 8 U.S.C.: Aliens and Nationality
- U.S.C. sections amended: 8 U.S.C. ch. 12, subch. II § 1182(d)(f); 8 U.S.C. ch. 12, subch. II § 1225(b); 8 U.S.C. ch. 12, subch. II § 1226; 8 U.S.C. ch. 12, subch. II § 1226(c); 8 U.S.C. ch. 12, subch. II § 1231(a)(2); 8 U.S.C. ch. 12, subch. II § 1252(f); 8 U.S.C. ch. 12, subch. II § 1253

Legislative history
- Introduced in the Senate as S. 5 by Katie Britt (R–AL) on January 6, 2025; Passed the Senate with amendments on January 20, 2025 (64–35); Passed the House on January 22, 2025 (263–156); Signed into law by President Donald Trump on January 29, 2025

The Laken Riley Act is a United States federal statute that requires the detention, without bond, of certain non-citizens (Note: Specifically, non-citizens inadmissible under section 212(a)(6)(A), (6)(C), or (7) of the Immigration and Nationality Act: those present without being admitted or paroled, those who committed immigration fraud or misrepresentation, and those lacking valid entry documents.) that are arrested for, charged with, or admit to committing certain crimes, including theft, burglary, larceny, shoplifting, assault on a law enforcement officer, or any crime resulting in death or serious bodily injury, such as drunk driving. The Act also allows states to sue the Department of Homeland Security for alleged failures in immigration enforcement, partially abrogating United States v. Texas (2023).

The bill was introduced following the murder of Laken Riley by an illegal immigrant who had previously been cited for shoplifting on the campus of the University of Georgia in Athens, Georgia. Congressman Mike Collins (who represents the area where Laken Riley was murdered) introduced the bill to the House. On January 22, 2025, the House agreed to the Senate's version of the bill with a 263–156 vote. President Donald Trump signed the bill into law on January 29, 2025.

== Background ==
On February 22, 2024, Georgia resident Laken Riley was murdered by José Antonio Ibarra, a Venezuelan 26-year-old man, who had entered the United States illegally in September 2022 by crossing the United States' southern border with Mexico near El Paso, Texas. Before the murder, Ibarra had been charged with "acting in a manner to injure a child less than 17 and a motor vehicle license violation" in New York City for "driving a scooter without a license and with a child who was not wearing a helmet." In 2023, he was arrested on charges of shoplifting in Athens, Georgia.

The murder gained attention from both politicians and the media because Ibarra entered the United States illegally and was allowed to stay to pursue his immigration case. Immigration and Customs Enforcement stated that it had issued a detainer for Ibarra after he was arrested in New York City. However, local officials released him before he could be taken into custody.

== Provisions ==
The act requires that the Department of Homeland Security, through Immigration and Customs Enforcement, detain certain non-citizen aliens without bail during their immigration proceedings. Previously, the Illegal Immigration Reform and Immigrant Responsibility Act of 1996 required that aliens who had committed certain crimes (e.g., aggravated felonies, drug and firearm violations, or human trafficking) be detained without bail while their immigration proceedings were pending.

The act expands this requirement to apply to any alien who "is charged with, is arrested for, is convicted of, admits having committed, or admits committing acts which constitute the essential elements of any burglary, theft, larceny, shoplifting, or assault of a law enforcement officer offense, or any crime that results in death or serious bodily injury to another person." The act also allows states to take legal action against the federal government if they determine it is in "violation of the detention and removal requirements" of the act.

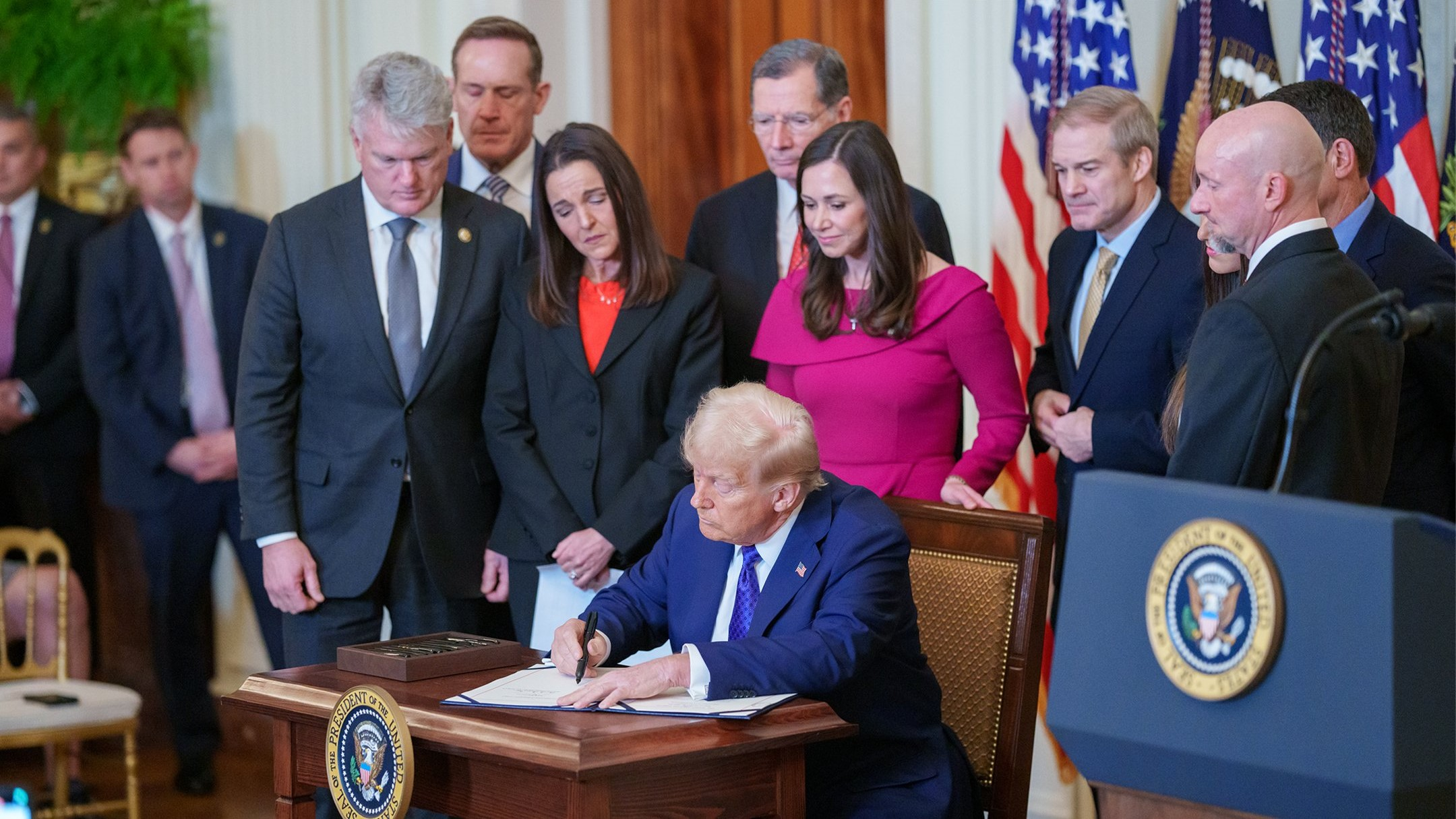
President Donald Trump signs the bill into law in the White House on January 29, 2025.

The amended version, which passed the Senate on January 20, includes the Cornyn Amendment, which provides for detaining aliens who are charged with or convicted of assaulting a law enforcement officer, and the Ernst Amendment (nicknamed "Sarah's Law"), which includes detaining aliens who are charged with or convicted of a crime that results in death or serious bodily injury like manslaughter resulting from driving under the influence.

The act also authorizes state governments to sue for injunctive relief over certain immigration-related decisions or alleged failures by the federal government if the decision or failure caused the state or its residents harm, including financial harm of more than $100. Specifically, the state government may sue the federal government over a:

- decision to release a non-U.S. national from custody;
- failure to fulfill requirements relating to inspecting individuals seeking admission into the United States, including requirements related to asylum interviews;
- failure to fulfill a requirement to stop issuing visas to nationals of a country that unreasonably denies or delays acceptance of nationals of that country;
- violation of limitations on immigration parole, such as the requirement that parole be granted only on a case-by-case basis; or
- failure to detain an individual who has been ordered removed from the United States.

== Legislative history ==
Congress	Short title	Bill numbers	Date introduced	Sponsors	# of cosponsors	Latest status
118th Congress	Laken Riley Act	H.R. 7511	March 1, 2024	Mike Collins (R–GA)	78	Passed House
119th Congress	Laken Riley Act	H.R. 29	January 3, 2025	Mike Collins (R–GA)	54	Passed House
119th Congress	Laken Riley Act	S. 5	January 6, 2025	Katie Britt (R–AL)	53	Signed into law

The bill was initially introduced in the House of Representatives in the 118th Congress and was named in honor of Laken Riley. It passed the House on March 7, 2024, by a vote of 251–170, with 37 Democrats (out of 213 total or 17% of Democrats) and all Republicans voting in favor of the bill. The bill stalled amidst opposition in the then Democratic-controlled Senate of the 118th Congress. The bill was reintroduced in the House of Representatives as H.R. 29 and in the Senate as S. 5 (the two bills shared the same text and title). H.R. 29 passed the House by a vote of 264–159 on January 7, 2025, as the first bill passed in the 119th Congress. All Republicans and 48 Democrats (out of 212 total or 23% of Democrats) voted in favor of passage. Seven Democrats who had voted against the bill in the 118th Congress voted in favor in the 119th.

On January 8, Senate Majority Leader John Thune moved to proceed to the consideration of the Laken Riley Act. The next day, the Senate voted to limit debate on the motion to proceed, by a vote of 84–9, and on January 13, approved it by a vote of 82–10. On January 17, following a long debate stage that spanned multiple days, the Senate invoked cloture on the bill by a vote of 61–35, with 10 Democrats (out of 45 total or 22%) voting in favor alongside all Republicans present.

Donald Trump signs the act, January 2025.

The Senate passed the amended bill version by a vote of 64–35 on January 20, with twelve Democrats (27% of Democrats) joining all Republicans. The Senate made two amendments to their version, one of which includes detaining unauthorized immigrants who are charged with or convicted of assaulting a police officer and another which provides for detaining unauthorized immigrants who are charged with or convicted of a crime that results in death or serious bodily injury like drunk driving. The House concurred in the Senate version on January 22, with 46 Democrats joining all Republicans. President Donald Trump signed the bill into law on January 29, 2025.

== Support and opposition ==
The Federation for American Immigration Reform and the Association of Mature American Citizens supported the bill. Laken Riley's mother, Allyson Phillips, stated that she was grateful the law was passed.

The American Immigration Council, the American Civil Liberties Union, the Center for Constitutional Rights, the League of Women Voters, the NAACP Legal Defense and Educational Fund, the Jewish Council for Public Affairs, the National Education Association, the National Organization for Women, the Southern Poverty Law Center, the United Steelworkers, the United Church of Christ, the National Association of Social Workers, the National Council of Churches, the Coalition of Black Trade Unionists, the Center for Law and Social Policy, and the Leadership Conference on Civil and Human Rights all opposed the bill. Critics of the bill expressed concern that it requires the detention of non-citizens who are arrested or charged, as opposed to actually convicted, of a crime, thereby subverting their due process rights.

== Impact ==
As of December 2025, reportedly 17,500 non-citizens had been detained and/or turned over to Immigration and Customs Enforcement (ICE) for detention and processing under the provisions of the Act. In September 2025, Judge Indira Talwani granted a petition for habeas corpus by an 18-year-old held under the act. In June 2026 former NFL linebacker Daniel Adongo was detained and deported to Kenya under the act.

== See also ==
- Deportation in the second Trump administration
- Habeas corpus in the United States
- Illegal immigration to the United States and crime
- List of United States immigration and nationality laws
- Revolving Door (advertisement)
