= Esplugues de Llobregat =

- Municipality
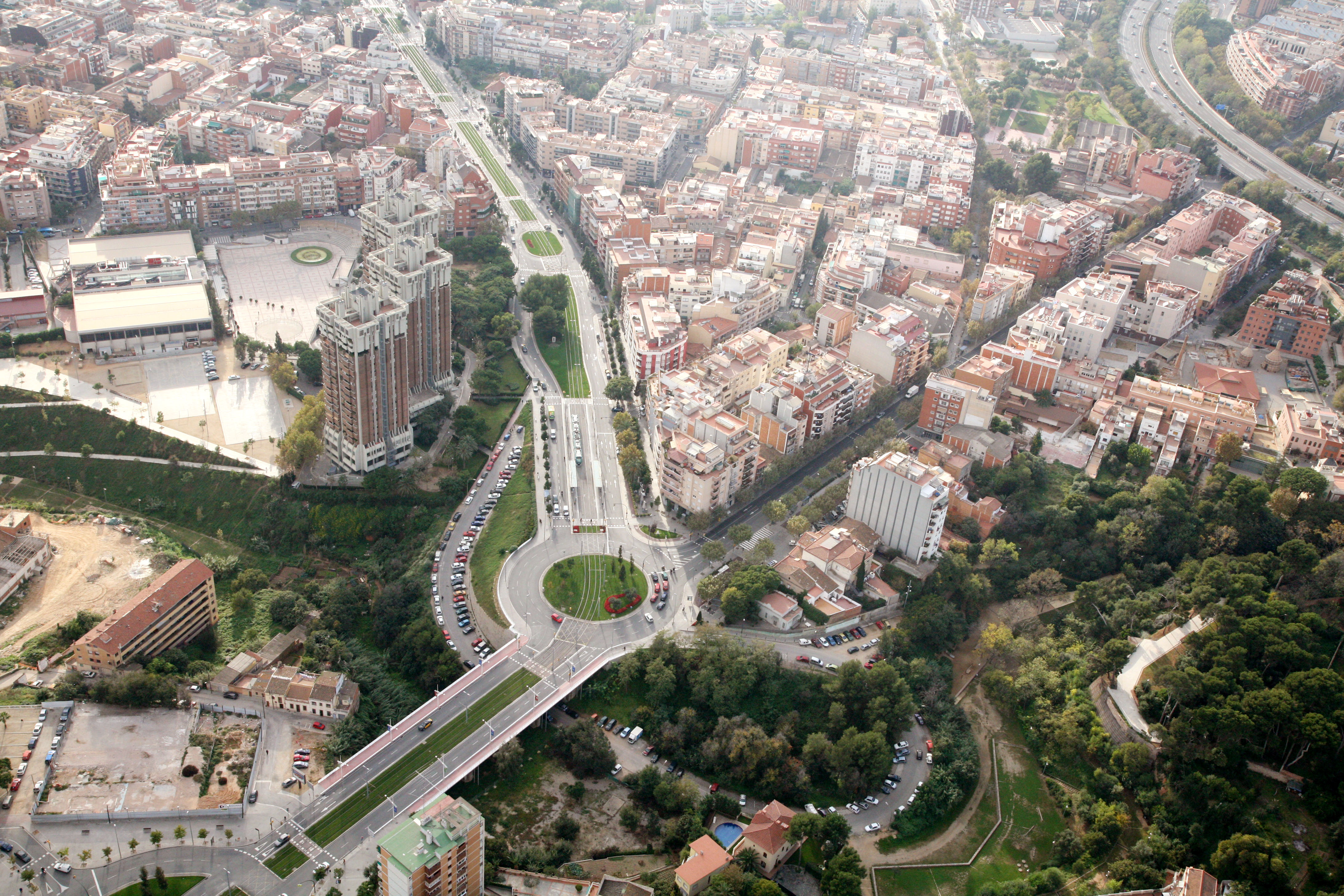
- Aerial view

- Flag Coat of arms

- Location in Catalonia Esplugues de Llobregat (Spain)
- Coordinates: 41°22′36″N 2°5′9″E
- Country: Spain
- Autonomous community: Catalonia
- Province: Barcelona
- Comarca: Baix Llobregat

Government
  - Mayor: Pilar Díaz Romero (2015)

Area
  - Total: 4.6 km^{2} (1.8 sq mi)
- Elevation: 110 m (360 ft)

Population (2025-01-01)
  - Total: 48,221
  - Estimate (2023): 46,968
  - Density: 10,000/km^{2} (27,000/sq mi)
- Demonyms: Espluguí, espluguina
- Time zone: UTC+1 (CET)
  - Summer (DST): UTC+2 (CEST)
- Postal code: 08950
- Website: www.esplugues.cat

Esplugues de Llobregat (Catalan pronunciation: [əsˈpluɣəz ðə ʎuβɾəˈɣat]) is a municipality of the Barcelona metropolitan area. Formerly in the Barcelonès, since 1990 it has been part of the comarca of Baix Llobregat. During recent decades, Esplugues has evolved from a predominantly industrial town to a more diverse service area while still preserving its cultural and historical identity.

Esplugues de Llobregat is known for its historic quarter, one of the oldest urban areas in the Baix Llobregat comarca. The Carrer de Montserrat runs through the architectural complex created by sculptor Xavier Corberó between 1968 and 2017. The Can Cortada manor house was the residence of Rafael d'Amat i de Cortada, Baron of Maldà, author of Calaix de Sastre, an important work of late 18th-century Catalan literature. The municipality also contains several parks and green spaces, including Parc de la Solidaritat, Parc dels Torrents and Parc de Can Vidalet. Sant Pere Màrtir, located within Collserola range, overlooks the municipality and the surrounding area.

The German School of Barcelona, La Miranda, the Highlands School and the American School of Barcelona are located in town and attract wealthy expatriate families. Due to its proximity to the Camp Nou stadium, many famous people reside in Esplugues, including the footballers Gerard Piqué, Andrés Iniesta, Lamine Yamal, and Dani Alves, the motorcycle racer Sete Gibernau, and the former World Number 1 tennis player Arantxa Sánchez.

== City connection ==
Esplugues de Llobregat is connected to the highways B-20 and B-23, the N-340 road, and its location right across from the Avinguda Diagonal, an avenue in Barcelona. The city resides 11 km (7 mi) away from the Airport of Barcelona, it is 13 km (8 mi) away from the port of Barcelona, and 10 km (6 mi) away from the Catalan capital downtown.

It is linked to Barcelona through the following bus lines: 57, 63, 67, 68, 157, metropolitan buses, and T1, T2 and T3 Trambaix lines. The only metro station in the area is Can Vidalet, on the L5 line. Two other stops are under construction and will be opened in 2018.

== History ==
At the summit of Sant Pere Màrtir mountain, remains of Iberian pottery have been found (monochrome glazed pottery, oxidized pottery, and Iberian "sandwich" type pottery), although no structural remains have been discovered. Esplugues de Llobregat has been documented since the year 964, in a will that mentions houses, vineyards, and orchards but does not reference any population center. It was not until 1096 that a territorial delimitation was recorded, noting around ten houses and approximately fifty inhabitants.

No remains of the small church from that time have survived, but it is known that it was very small, Romanesque, and had a modest bell gable. Dedicated to Saint Mary Magdalene, it was consecrated in 1103 by Bishop Berenguer of Barcelona. In the 12th century, the most influential family was the Picalquers, who owned most of the land in the area, including the Castle of Picalquers. During the Middle Ages, Esplugues was organized around two centers: the "sagrera," which housed the church and several farmhouses, and the Raval area, where the castle and an old inn were located.

It was not until the 18th century, with the construction of the Royal Road, that the town center shifted towards this new route, causing the old Raval nucleus to lose prominence. Evidence of this transformation includes the construction of a new inn (now the town hall) and the emergence of workers' houses on both sides of the road. By the 20th century, Esplugues transitioned from a village to a town, particularly from the 1950s onward, when its population grew from 5,000 inhabitants to 49,000 by 1990.

In recent decades, Esplugues has evolved from an industrial town into a service-oriented one, notable for its proximity to Barcelona. This has led to housing prices becoming, on average, among the highest in Spain.

== Demography ==
1900	1930	1950	1970	1986	2002
1,057	3,218	4,318	29,474	47,670	46,447

The municipality has a population of 46,447.

=== Public Art ===
The municipality boasts numerous works of public art in its streets, squares, parks, and gardens. Can Vidalet Park features a Nymph by an unknown artist located in a small pond, as well as a Maternity by Eulàlia Fàbregas de Sentmenat (1966) and I Only Want to Become What I Am Not (Juan Ignacio Lomas, 2007). Similarly, Solidaridad Park features the works Atrium Libertatis (Alberto de Udaeta, 1998) and Between Dream and Desire (Alberto José Mesecuer). Likewise, in the gardens of Ca n'Hospital, we find four sculptures by Eulàlia Fàbregas (To the Victims of All Wars, Girl with Dog; Girl with Dove; and Girl with Boy). Other gardens with sculptural presence are those of the Robert Brillas Cultural Centre: Woman with a Guitar (Montserrat Sastre, 1986) and Commemoration of the Arrival of the Canigó Flame (Joan Sanagustín, 1985).

Works on public roads include Montesa Prototype 1947-1970 (Josep Maria Subirachs, 1971), Esplugas in the Lower Llobregat (Agustí Guasch, 1985), Homage to Laureà Miró (Marcel Martí, 1985), To the Master (Eduard Estartús, 1995), Plenitude (Jorge Egea, 1999), Argo (Manel Marzo-Mart, 1999), Commemoration of the Constitution (Joaquim Lluís Martínez, 2000) and Soul (Jaume Plensa, 2013). The town has several sculptures by Eulàlia Fàbregas de Sentmenat: apart from those already mentioned in the parks of Can Vidalet and Ca n'Hospital, there are Alba, Allegory and Female Nude (1985). Several areas of the city also have works by Xavier Corberó, an artist who settled in the city, where he had his home-studio (the current Espacio Corberó) and who bequeathed several works to the municipality: Samurai (1995), Familia (2003), Encuentro (2006) and the groups formed by La Ben Plantada, Jordi, José and Concepción (in Elisabeth Eidenbenz square) and La Cinteta, Eulàlia and Doloretes (in San Mateo street).

== Education ==
International schools in the municipality include:

- German School of Barcelona
- American School of Barcelona

== Twin towns ==
- Ahrensburg, Germany
- Macael, Spain

== Notable people ==
- Ailyn, singer and songwriter
- Carme Chacón, politician and minister of Defence
- Xavier Corberó, sculptor
- Óscar Jaenada, actor
- Mercedes Milá, journalist
- Lorenzo Milá, journalist
- Víctor Ruiz, retired footballer
- Lamine Yamal, footballer
- Paula Blasi, cyclist
