= Lorenzo Milá =

Spanish journalist

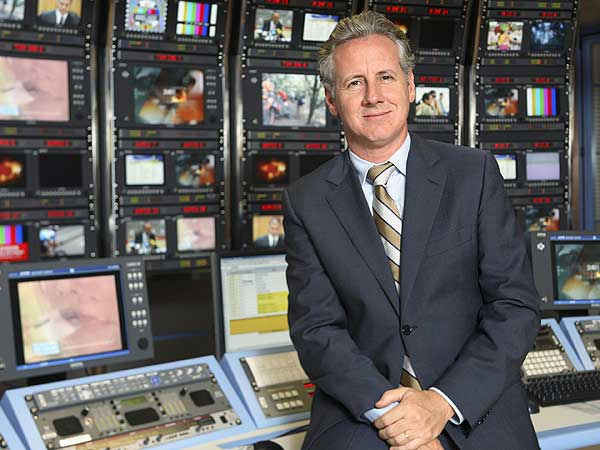
- Milá in 1994
- Born: Lorenzo Milá Mencos; 8 October 1960 (age 66); Esplugues de Llobregat (Barcelona), Spain
- Occupations: Television presenter, journalist
- Years active: Early 1980s–present
- Relatives: Mercedes Milá (sister); María Asunción Milá (aunt)

Lorenzo Milá Mencos (born 8 October 1960 in Esplugues de Llobregat, Barcelona) is a Spanish newscaster and journalist. He is the son of José Luis Milá Sagnier, count of Montseny, and is married to Sagrario Ruiz de Apodaca (also a TV journalist), with whom he has three children.

Milá obtained his information sciences degree in 1978 at the University of Barcelona. He started his career as a sports journalist, working as an editor for the newspaper Sport. From 1986 onwards, he started to collaborate on various Televisión Española game shows. From 1988 to 1989, he lived in London and worked for Screensport. After that he returned to Spain and continued working at the Sant Cugat TVE center in the sports department.

In 1994, Milá moved to Madrid to anchor the newly created news broadcast on TVE2, La 2 Noticias, which he headed until 2003.

From September 2003 to September 2004, Milá was posted to Washington, D.C., as an adjunct foreign correspondent, accompanying his wife, who was the main correspondent there. Afterward, Carmen Caffarel, managing director of RTVE, appointed Milá as the main anchor of the nightly edition of TVE1's Telediario, which regained its ratings lead over Antena 3's newscasts (anchored by Matías Prats) in 2007.

In addition to anchoring Telediario, Milá also hosted the interview program Tengo una pregunta para usted ("I have a question for you"), in which studio audience members questioned politicians.

On 31 July 2009, Milá anchored his last Telediario before returning to Washington D.C. as a foreign correspondent for TVE. In 2014, he later became TVE's foreign correspondent in Rome, Italy.

== Personal life ==
His sister is television presenter and journalist Mercedes Milá and his aunt was human rights activist María Asunción Milá.
