= AARP =

American nonprofit organization

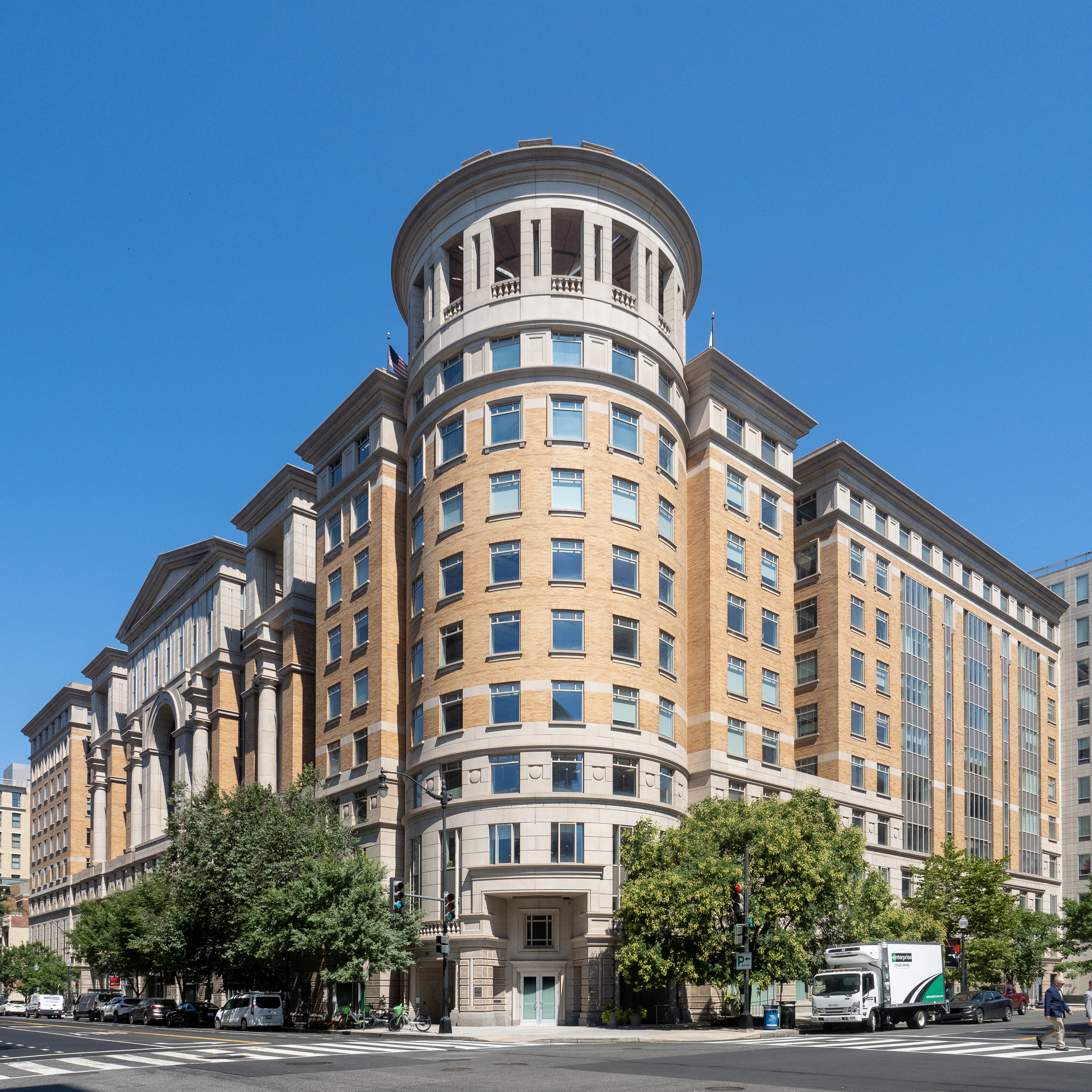
- AARP headquarters in Washington, D.C. (2024)
- Formation: 1958; 68 years ago
- Founder: Ethel Percy Andrus; Leonard Davis
- Type: 501(c)(4) non-profit organization
- Tax ID no.: 95-1985500
- Headquarters: 601 E Street, NW, Washington, D.C., U.S.
- Location(s): Offices in all 50 U.S. states, Washington, D.C., Puerto Rico, and U.S. Virgin Islands
- CEO: Dr. Myechia Minter-Jordan
- Board Chair: Lloyd E. Johnson
- Subsidiaries: AARP Foundation; AARP Services Inc; Legal Counsel for the Elderly; OATS/Senior Planet; Wish of a Lifetime
- Staff: 2,250
- Website: aarp.org
- Formerly called: American Association of Retired Persons (1958–1999)

AARP, formerly the American Association of Retired Persons, is an interest group in the United States focusing on issues affecting those 50 and older. The organization, which is headquartered in Washington, D.C., said it had more than 38 million members as of 2018. The magazine and bulletin it sends to its members are the two largest-circulation publications in the United States.

AARP was formed in 1958 by Ethel Percy Andrus, a retired educator from California, and Leonard Davis, who later founded Colonial Penn's insurance companies. It is an influential lobbying group in the United States. AARP sells paid memberships, and markets insurance and other services to its members.

== Overview ==
AARP is a nonpartisan 501(c)(4) nonprofit that advocates for older Americans on a number of federal health and fiscal issues such as Medicare and Social Security, and at the state and local level for better community healthcare services and lower utility rates. It fights age discrimination in the workforce, lobbies for lower prescription drug prices, and educates seniors about consumer fraud through the AARP Fraud Watch Network.

AARP has millions of volunteer activists and offices in every state, as well as Washington D.C., Puerto Rico, and the Virgin Islands.

Through affiliated organizations such as the AARP Foundation, AARP helps seniors with legal assistance, tax preparation, job training, and personal finance.

Members receive AARP Magazine and the AARP Bulletin, the top-circulating consumer publications in the country, along with special offers and discounts related to travel, restaurants, prescriptions, and more. A full AARP membership is available to those 50 and older; however, those under 50 can also join.

AARP licenses its brand to certain products, including Medicare insurance with UnitedHealthcare. A volunteer board of directors oversees the organization.

According to its 2018 Consolidated Financial Statement, the largest sources of income were:

- royalties for the rights to use AARP's intellectual property (name, logo, etc.) paid by commercial providers of products, services, and discounts for AARP members $908,960,000;
- membership dues $301,017,000;
- advertisements placed in its publications $147,687,000; and
- total operating revenue $1,648,795,000

== History ==
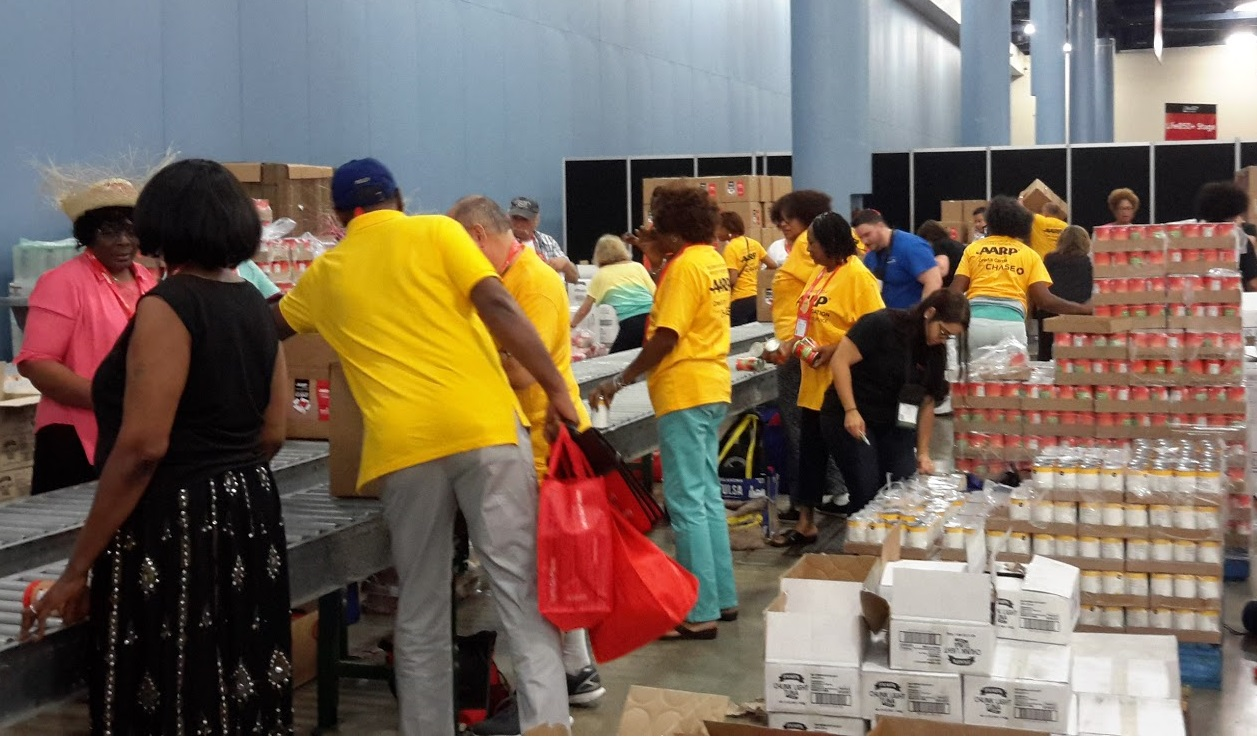
AARP volunteers packing food for older Americans in need at a packing event in Miami

=== 20th century ===
AARP was founded in 1958 by Ethel Percy Andrus, a retired California public school teacher and principal.

Andrus had been an advocate for health insurance coverage for retired teachers. Volunteering with the California Retired Teachers Association (CRTA), Andrus sought out former teachers who were struggling on their $40/month state pensions. Her goal was to get them out of poverty and access to affordable health insurance.

In 1944, Andrus checked on a former Spanish teacher who was ill and found her living in a chicken coop. Like many other retirees at the time, her pension was not enough to afford adequate housing or healthcare. Before Medicare was enacted in 1965, no national program existed in the United States to provide health insurance to people aged 65 and older. At the same time, many states enforced mandatory retirement, forcing people to leave their jobs and forfeit health coverage. The poverty rate for Americans 65 and older was 35 percent higher than any other age group. Shocked by what she saw, Andrus helped the teacher get the care she needed and began searching for ways to improve older adults' health and financial security.

In 1947, Andrus formed the National Retired Teachers Association (NRTA) to secure affordable group health coverage. She met with 42 private insurance companies who deemed adults over 65 to be "uninsurable" and was rejected each time. The policy that Andrus had in mind covered individuals aged 65 and older, with no exclusions for pre-existing health conditions. Leonard Davis, an insurance broker from New York, offered to work with Andrus to develop a pilot program for retired teachers in New York. The experiment was a financial success, and he and Andrus teamed up to establish a national version – the NRTA Health Plan insured by Continental Casualty Co. in 1955. In 1958, the American Association of Retired Persons Membership (AARP) was incorporated and reached 130,000 in its first year.

The NRTA/AARP insurance model was the first in the United States to open a new insurance market for older Americans. AARP expanded beyond health insurance and began developing other benefits, programs, and services for its members, each tailored to the needs of people aged 55 and older and filling a market gap. For example, she created one of the first modern retirement homes, Grey Gables, in Ojai, California, in 1954, designed to keep older residents healthy, active, and socially engaged.

Word about the NRTA Health Plan spread, and thousands of retired non-educators who also faced challenges finding health coverage contacted the NRTA about joining. In 1958, Andrus created the American Association of Retired Persons (AARP) as a sister organization to NRTA. Through membership in AARP, the general population age 55 and older gained access to the insurance benefits previously limited to former teachers.

In 1958, AARP began publishing its magazine called Modern Maturity to spread the word about the association, keep members informed of its activities, and publicize issues affecting older adults.

National concern about pharmaceutical industry practices at this time prompted U.S. Senator Estes Kefauver (D-Tenn), who chaired the Senate Judiciary Antitrust and Monopoly Subcommittee, to lead a congressional investigation into prescription drug prices, which lasted from 1959 to 1962. Andrus testified four times during the investigation, and NRTA/AARP legislative director Ernest Gidding testified once.

In 1958, President Dwight D. Eisenhower signed legislation creating the first White House Conference on Aging. He named Andrus to the National Advisory Committee for the first conference, held in 1961. More than 2,500 delegates met in Washington, D.C. over four days to address challenges facing older adults such as poverty, housing, and healthcare, and develop policy recommendations for the administration. White House conferences on aging have been held every decade since the first and are credited with making contributions to U.S. aging policy, including laying the groundwork for Medicare.

At the first conference, AARP spotlighted a potential solution to the growing issue of older adults with mobility problems living independently. It constructed the House of Freedom in downtown Washington, D.C., the nation's first universal design home easily accessible by older adults and people with disabilities. It was built by AARP and the Douglas Fir Plywood Association and signaled the beginning of AARP's work to help older Americans remain independent in their own homes and neighborhoods for as long as they wanted.

By 1962, the combined membership of AARP and NRTA had grown to 400,000, making it one of the largest membership organizations in the United States.

In 1963, Leonard Davis bought out Continental Casualty's AARP/NRTA insurance policies and formed Colonial Penn, his own company, which became the sole provider of insurance to AARP/NRTA.

In 1968, AARP launched Tax-Aide, which matched low and moderate-income people with trained volunteers who provided free tax preparation and filing services.

As AARP grew, it expanded the range of benefits offered to its members. It established a travel service that took members on modestly priced domestic and international trips, created a retired senior volunteer program, and offered a range of discounts.

Increasingly, AARP's members were asking the organization to take on age discrimination in the marketplace. Hundreds of members wrote to AARP in the early years, explaining that auto insurers and rental companies were charging punishing rates for older drivers, classifying them as high-risk and reckless just because of their age. AARP challenged the insurers and rental companies with research that demonstrated drivers over the age of 65 were among the safest.

In 1979, the organization began offering a driver safety course for any licensed driver, taught by volunteers. In 2016, the AARP Driver Safety Program taught 360,000 older drivers in classrooms and another 130,000 through its online course. Some who take the training receive discounts on their insurance premiums. In 1984, AARP licensed its brand name to auto insurance that members could purchase that could not be canceled solely because of age.

In 1973, AARP created a charitable affiliate, the AARP Andrus Foundation, to award research grants in gerontology.

Andrus continued to run AARP until 1967 when she died of a heart attack at age 82. Today, the NRTA is a division within AARP. She wrote her final column for Modern Maturity four days before she died.

In 1975, AARP had over seven million members, making it one of the largest membership organizations in the country. In 1977, it enrolled its ten millionth member. By the end of the 1980s, membership nearly tripled to 33 million and AARP mailings were so large that the organization had its own zip code. It had tens of thousands of volunteers, the highest circulation magazine in the nation, and rising national awareness. In 1997, it topped Fortune's first annual list of the most powerful lobbying organizations.

In 1984, AARP reduced its membership age from 55 to 50. It began sending "birthday" cards and membership invitations to Americans approaching their 50th birthday.

During this phase of rapid growth for AARP, competing insurance providers entered the marketplace, selling plans tailored to retired Americans. With more competition, the quality of Colonial Penn's offerings and the nature of AARP's relationship with Colonial Penn came into question.

In 1982, NRTA formally merged with AARP. In 1988, it formed a career planning workshop for older Americans who were unemployed and introduced a series of AARP mutual funds in 1997.

By the mid-1990s, telemarketing fraud had become pervasive and cost consumers more than $40 billion annually. A 1995 AARP survey found that more than half of all victims were aged 50 or older, a group that constituted less than one-third of the U.S. population. In 1995, working with the National Association of Attorneys General and the FBI, AARP helped expose a series of boiler room operations targeting thousands of potential phone fraud victims across the country. Acting as victims, AARP members volunteered to collect evidence for the Federal Bureau of Investigation's Operation Senior Sentinel targeting illegal telemarketers. In 1996, 78 million baby boomers began turning 50, contributing to AARP's growth.

In 1999, the organization changed from the American Association of Retired Persons to AARP, dropping the word "retirement". At the time, a third of AARP's members were still in the workforce. AARP no longer requires that members be retired, and there are no longer any age restrictions even for full membership.

=== 21st century ===
Recognizing the changing circumstances of its membership, AARP began offering more work-related tools and resources and ramped up its advocacy against age discrimination in the workplace. Beginning in 2009, AARP backed the "Protecting Older Workers Against Discrimination Act" (POWADA), which aims to restore fairness for workers aged 40 and over by treating age discrimination as seriously as other forms of workplace discrimination. As of 2020, POWADA has been passed by the House of Representatives and is with the Senate.

In 2017, the organization created an online jobs board to connect job seekers over 50 with employers. AARP also created an employer pledge program, where more than 1,000 employers—including Google and CVS—promised to adhere to a set of age-friendly hiring and employment practices.

In 2018, AARP Foundation lawyers represented two employees of the Ohio State University who were forced out of their jobs because of their age. This action resulted in a settlement that helped the employees regain their positions and receive back pay. It required the university to hold training sessions with its staff on preventing age bias.

AARP has advocated for the federal Age Discrimination in Employment Act (ADEA) since its passage in 1967, which protects workers at or over the age of 40 from bias in the workplace.

Myechia Minter-Jordan, a public health advocate and physician, was named as the next CEO of the organization in November 2024.

=== Economic security ===
Facing growing pension obligations and high annual health cost increases, American businesses in the 2000s began scaling back their retirement and health benefits to employees. While 35 percent of private-sector workers had a defined benefit pension in the 1990s, only 18 percent did in 2013. Beginning in 2004, AARP opposed attempts to undermine the guaranteed nature of the Social Security program through privatization or diverting Social Security payroll taxes to private accounts.

AARP's research indicates that nearly half (57 million) of American workers have no access to a retirement savings plan through their employers. Through its state offices, the organization began advocating individual states to enact work and save programs, which made it easier for businesses to create a private retirement savings account for employees. As of 2020, eighteen states had signed Work and Save programs into law.

=== Health care ===
Continuing a theme that began at its founding, AARP during this period used its lobbying efforts to advocate against reductions in Medicare benefits and to protect the federal program that offered health coverage to older Americans.

In 2003, AARP supported legislation proposed by Republican President George W. Bush that included partial coverage for prescription drugs for Medicare beneficiaries, among other things. Democratic congressional leaders, seeking a more generous benefit, strongly opposed the bill and prompted thousands of AARP members to quit in protest. Six years later, in 2009, AARP endorsed the Affordable Care Act (ACA) proposed by Democratic President Barack Obama, which protected those with pre-existing health conditions, limited the amount that insurance companies could charge because of age, provided tax credits, and improved drug coverage in Medicare. At that time, more than 50 million Americans were without health insurance coverage at some point during the year. The ACA, which passed a year later, was opposed by Republicans and AARP's support prompted thousands of members to leave the organization.

In 2019, with the price of prescription drugs far outpacing inflation, AARP began lobbying for legislative and industry changes to lower prescription medication costs. AARP supported a bipartisan bill by Sens. Charles Grassley (R-IA) and Ron Wyden (D-OR) that set caps on drug costs for Medicare beneficiaries and increased pressure on drug companies to lower prices.

That year, AARP also supported the Trump administration's goal of allowing Americans to import lower-cost drugs from other countries. In 2021, the organization backed a House Democratic bill that, among other things, would allow Medicare to use its bargaining power to negotiate lower drug prices with manufacturers. AARP backed legislation proposed by President Biden and passed by Congress in 2022 that would enable Medicare to negotiate with drug companies for lower prices, set caps on out-of-pocket drug spending by those on Medicare and capped the price for insulin at $35.

=== Brain health ===
In 2016, the organization created Staying Sharp, a program that allowed people to evaluate their brain health through a scientifically based assessment and receive tips for slowing cognitive decline. In 2018, AARP invested $60 million in the Dementia Discovery Fund, which supports research into diagnosis, treatments, and cures for dementia. In 2022, Consumer Reports stated that the AARP’s Global Council on Brain Health found that some dietary supplements promoted for boosting brain health offered no benefit for most people.

== Advocacy ==
=== Health care ===
AARP has been active in healthcare policy debates since the 1960s. Its focus areas have included Medicare, affordable health insurance, and lower prescription drug costs and its recent engagement is a reflection of this long-standing involvement.

=== Medicare ===
AARP testified before Congress in support of the Older Americans Act and the amendments to Social Security that created the Medicare Program, which President Johnson enacted into law in 1965.

AARP's public stances influenced the United States Congress' passage of the Medicare Prescription Drug, Improvement, and Modernization Act, which created Medicare Part D, in 2003, and also influenced Congress by resisting changes to Social Security in 2005. President George W. Bush called the Medicare legislation "the greatest advance in health care coverage for America's seniors since the founding of Medicare." In 2007, AARP launched the "Divided We Fail" campaign with the Business Roundtable, the National Federation of Independent Business and the Service Employees International Union. The campaign urged presidential candidates in both major parties to commit to making health insurance coverage more affordable and to strengthen Social Security.

=== Lower prescription drug costs ===
As early as 1959, AARP began advocating for lower prescription drug costs to ease the burden on older consumers. Founder Ethel Percy Andrus testified during the 1962 Senate hearings on pharmaceutical industry pricing practices. "Our concern is relief from suffering and improvement of health. We feel that 15 to 20 percent profit earned by several large manufacturers is detrimental to this concern," Andrus told the committee in 1962. AARP regularly publishes Rx Price Watch Reports noting pricing trends in popular drugs for seniors.

From 2018 to 2019, AARP helped pass more than 35 laws aimed at lowering drug prices at the local level.

In early 2017, AARP strongly opposed the American Health Care Act of 2017, saying that older Americans would be unfairly burdened with higher premiums and smaller tax credits.

In 2019, AARP mounted a multi-million dollar campaign against the pharmaceutical industry and its high drug prices called "Stop Rx Greed" and supported a bipartisan bill by Sens. Charles Grassley (R-IA), and Ron Wyden (D-OR) that set caps on drug costs for Medicare beneficiaries and increased pressure on drug companies to lower prices. In 2021, AARP launched the "Fair Rx Prices Now!" Campaign to support legislation enabling the Medicare Program to negotiate prices with drug companies to lower prices for consumers, limit price increases for certain drugs, and cap out-of-pocket spending by Medicare beneficiaries.

AARP pushed Congress to include drug pricing reform in the proposed Inflation Reduction Act of 2022, ran ads countering drug industry claims, and mobilized its members to lobby their representatives to pass the bill. The Act was signed into law in August 2022. The Inflation Reduction Act requires HHS, for the first time, to negotiate prices with drug makers for many of the most expensive drugs covered under Medicare. It also penalizes drug companies that raise prices more than the inflation rate and sets a cap of $2,000 on annual out-of-pocket drug spending for Medicare's more than 63 million beneficiaries beginning in 2025. These provisions in the act could be life-changing for older Americans who rely on high-priced prescription drugs, saving some thousands of dollars a year.

In a 2014 study conducted by AARP, 93% of people identified maintaining brain health as a high priority as they age. AARP created a brain health assessment and program called Staying Sharp and it formed the Global Council on Brain Health – an independent, international group of brain health experts and researchers that publishes findings such as the impact of music on brain health. In 2018, AARP donated $60 million to the Dementia Discovery Fund for research into the causes and treatments of Alzheimer's Disease.

In 2022, AARP held "The World's Most Expensive Tailgate" to highlight problems with rising drug prices. The organization shared what popular tailgate items would cost if their prices had increased at the same rate as drug prices over the last 15 years.

=== Health insurance ===
Approximately 38 million people have AARP-branded health insurance, including drug coverage and Medigap, as of December 2024. As of the most recently available information, AARP earned $1.853 billion USD in revenue for the year ended December 31, 2023, with $1,134 billion USD (61%) stemming from royalties; they also incurred program expenses for the year worth $1,365 billion, primarily community engagement/outreach service expenses of $495 million (36%) and publication/communication expenses of $446 million (33%).

While AARP is not an insurer, it allows its name to be used by insurance companies in the sale of products, for which it is paid a commission.

Congressional members have sometimes accused AARP of having a conflict of interest in taking sides over health insurance debates. AARP licenses its brand to UnitedHealth Group#UnitedHealthcare which sells Medigap policies. As of October 2009, health care reform contained a proposal to trim an associated program Medicare Advantage, which was expected to increase demand for Medigap policies.

=== Social Security ===
AARP has long been an advocate for preserving Social Security as a safety net for older Americans. Since March 2012, AARP's "You've Earned a Say" campaign has sought to foster nonpartisan conversations about how to strengthen Social Security and Medicare. The Richmond (VA) Times-Dispatch reported: "AARP took the debate about Medicare and Social Security from what it called behind closed doors in Washington to a series of town hall meetings around the country to make sure retirees have a voice in the discussion."

In 2023, AARP started campaigning for the Social Security Administration (SSA) to receive a $1.4 billion increase in funding to improve its "woeful" customer service. The AARP also called for the SSA to "step up non-monetary measures to improve customer service and quality," stating that all issues will not be resolved with more funding alone.

In the summer of 2023, AARP held a series of nationwide forums to help educate people about social security and debunk social security myths. The forum in Richmond was held alongside The National Committee to Preserve Social Security and Medicare (NCPSSM).

=== Age discrimination ===
AARP advocated for the Age Discrimination in Employment Act of 1967 and the Age Discrimination Act of 1975. A 2020 joint project with The Economist Intelligence Unit reported that age discrimination cost the U.S. $850 billion in lost gross domestic product in 2018. In 2020, AARP supported the passage of the Protecting Older Workers Against Discrimination Act (POWADA), which aimed to restore protections under the Age Discrimination Employment Act that were adversely affected by a 2009 Supreme Court decision.

In 2018, AARP worked to change how older people are portrayed in media and advertising to reduce age discrimination. The organization spoke against stock photos portraying people who are 50+ as confused or incapable and pressed advertising agencies and their clients to update their portrayals of aging. AARP worked with Getty Images to introduce 1,400 images of older people running businesses, playing sports, and spending time with younger generations. The photos were part of the Disrupt Aging Collection.

In 2018, the organization also spoke out against employers who use age-specific targeting features on online platforms, denying all age groups the ability to see job opportunities.

The AARP Employer Pledge program is for employers who publicly pledge to work to end ageism. To join the program, employers must not have any discrimination lawsuits within the past five years and must agree to recruit across diverse age groups and consider all applications equally. In 2022, there were over 1,000 signees, including Humana, Microsoft, Marriott International, and McDonald's.

=== Consumer fraud protection ===
In 2017 the AARP and the U.S. Postal Inspection Service launched Operation Protect Veterans. This national campaign uses local outreach, ads, emails, social media, a website, and phone calls to warn the military about scams.

The AARP Fraud Watch Network holds "reverse boiler rooms" to help warn people about consumer scams and teach them how to protect themselves. During these events, AARP volunteers call local residents to make them aware of fraud risks. Similar AARP events include Tip-Offs to Rip-Offs and the Scam Jam.

In 2023, Consumer Reports stated that the AARP offers a Fraud Helpline to contact if you believe your Social Security number or Medicare data was used fraudulently.

=== Local advocacy ===
AARP also advocates on the state and local levels through its offices around the country.

In New York, AARP helped achieve the following reforms: Care Act, Assisted Living protections, Anti Predatory Lending, Paid Family Leave, and Affordable Housing.

In 2022, AARP and others brought a class action lawsuit against Alden Group, a healthcare provider based in Illinois. AARP said that Alden's nursing facilities were intentionally understaffed, which led to neglect and unfair business practices.

AARP advocates locally against rising utility rates, for example, in Oklahoma, Colorado, Illinois, Georgia, Wisconsin, New Hampshire, and Florida.

== Programs and offerings ==
AARP also provides several non-advocacy support programs for people older than 50. These include the following:

=== Virtual Community Center ===
AARP's Virtual Community Center provides digital literacy courses, exercise classes, caregiving classes, and university lectures.

=== AARP Driver Safety ===
In 1979, AARP introduced the nation's first driver safety course geared towards older adults. AARP Driver Safety, which can be completed in a classroom setting or online, teaches defensive driving techniques and provides "added information on age-related cognitive and physical changes that affect driving". The course is instructed and promoted by volunteers throughout the U.S.

In addition to course fees, the program is supported by a grant from the automobile manufacturer, Toyota. Over a half million drivers completed the course in 2012 and over 15 million people completed the courses since 1979.

=== AARP publications and broadcasts ===
AARP The Magazine, with a circulation of approximately 37 million, and the AARP Bulletin with 30 million as of 2016, are the two largest-circulation publications in the United States. AARP The Magazine (known until 2002 as Modern Maturity), is a lifestyle magazine for people 50+. Established in 1958, the magazine is distributed bi-monthly to AARP members. Other publications include The Journal and several newsletters. In 2018, the digital publication titled Sisters from AARP was launched, aimed at African American women.

The organization also produces radio programs and has a book division.

AARP en Español is AARP's Spanish-language multimedia platform. Offerings include a Spanish-language website, a Spanish-language YouTube channel, and informational resources.

=== Awards ===
AARP's Purpose Prize is awarded to people 50 and older who are making a social impact. The award was started in 2005 by CoGenerate and transferred to AARP in 2016.

The Movies for Grownups Awards "recognizes achievements of those in the entertainment industry age 50 and over, and the films that speak to that vast audience", as well as supports the overall goals of the AARP. Past recipients include Denzel Washington, Annette Bening, Jeff Bridges, Viola Davis, Morgan Freeman, Michael Douglas, and Lily Tomlin.

=== Innovation Labs ===
The AARP Innovation Labs works to identify products and services that can help the aging.

=== Finances and the economy ===
==== Tax Aide ====
AARP Foundation's Tax Aide provides free tax assistance through trained and IRS-certified tax preparers. Tax Aide operates nationwide.

==== The Longevity Economy Outlook ====
"The Longevity Economy Outlook: How people age 50 and older are fueling economic growth, stimulating jobs, and creating opportunities for all" is a 2019 report jointly released by AARP and The Economist Intelligence Unit. The report focuses on the impact of the 50-plus population on the economy, and uses a forecasting model from REMI as well as spending, workforce, and tax contribution data. It also includes the estimated economic value of unpaid activities like volunteering and caregiving. This report updated a 2013 study.

In 2020, the Global Longevity Economy Outlook was published. It focused on how much older adults contributed to the global gross domestic product.

==== Telephone "town halls" ====
During the coronavirus pandemic, AARP hosted state and national telephone town halls to share information about the virus, vaccines, boosters, and other relevant topics such as mental and financial challenges for those aged fifty-plus, nursing homes, and voting procedures.

=== Affiliates ===
AARP has several affiliated organizations, including:

- AARP Foundation, a 501(c)(3) non-profit charity that helps people over age 50 who are socioeconomically disadvantaged; it includes:
  - AARP Experience Corps, a 501(c)(3) non-profit charity that encourages people over age 50 to mentor and tutor school children
  - AARP Institute, a non-profit charity that holds some of AARP's charitable gift annuity funds
- AARP Services, Inc., a for-profit corporation that provides quality control and research on new AARP products.
- Legal Counsel for the Elderly, a 501(c)(3) charity that provides legal aid to seniors in the Washington, D.C.
- AARP Financial Services Corporation, a for-profit corporation that holds AARP's real estate.
- AARP Insurance Plan' is an organization that runs some of AARP's group health insurance policies.

== Criticism ==
In 2004, BusinessWeek said questions have arisen in the past about whether AARP's commercial interests may conflict with those of its membership, and characterizes many of the funds and insurance policies that AARP markets as providing considerably less benefit than seniors could get on their own.

In a November 2008 editorial, The Des Moines Register and the Canada Free Press called AARP a lobbying group masquerading as a non-profit, meanwhile charging high membership fees and selling expensive private health care plans.

Senator Chuck Grassley (R-Iowa), senior Republican on the Senate Finance Committee, said in 2008 that the "limited benefit" insurance plans offered by AARP through UnitedHealth provided inadequate coverage and were marketed deceptively. One plan offered $5,000 for surgery that may cost two or three times that amount.

Criticism has been leveled at AARP staff's salaries and the use of first-class and business-class travel for short trips. According to AARP's 2014 IRS annual return, Chief Executive Officer Addison B. Rand received $1,698,289 of salary and benefits from AARP and its subsidiaries. Board members, officers, and key employees flew first class on flights longer than five hours unless business class was available. The Chief Executive Officer flew first-class on flights longer than 90 minutes. AARP reported that it had spent $8,694,890 on the compensation of its officers, directors, and key employees during 2014.

=== Senate investigation ===
In 1995, Senator Alan K. Simpson launched an investigation into AARP's books, financial interests, and hiring practices. He described AARP as "a vast empire that has figured out how to gimmick the nonprofit laws" describing the organization as "33 million people paying $8 dues, bound together by a common love of airline discounts and automobile discounts and pharmacy discounts," and that members "haven't the slightest idea what the organization is asking for."

The investigations did not reveal sufficient evidence to change the organization's status.

=== Class action lawsuits ===
In 2018 and 2019, several class action lawsuits were filed against AARP regarding insurance policies. One lawsuit is over undisclosed licensing revenue that AARP earned from AARP-branded Medigap insurance policies. Another lawsuit claims that AARP acted as an insurance agent or an insurance broker, neither of which AARP is licensed to be, for AARP-branded Medigap insurance policies. In another lawsuit, the plaintiff said that AARP should not have used its status to claim the AARP-branded insurance policies were "best for seniors".

All the lawsuits were dismissed.

== See also ==
- AARP/Blue Zones Vitality Project
- Association of Mature American Citizens
- International Association of Homes and Services for the Aging
- Gray Panthers
- 60 Plus Association
- Senior citizen
