= German School of Barcelona =

- Deutsche Schule Barcelona; Colegio Alemán Barcelona; Col·legi Alemany de Barcelona
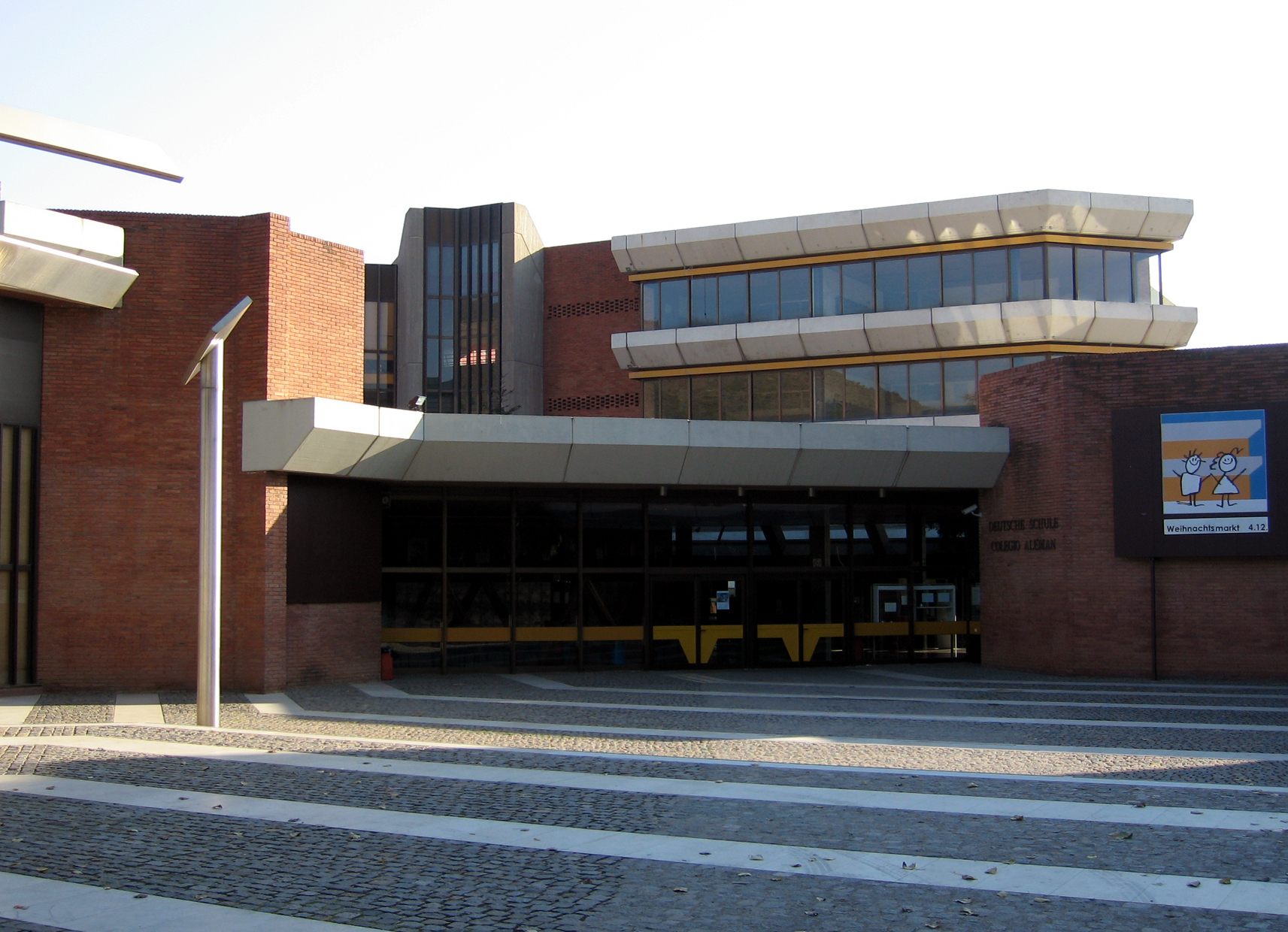
- The school's main entrance at Jacint Esteva Fontanet avenue

Location
- Avda. Jacinto Esteva Fontanet, 105 E 08950 ESPLUGUES de Llobregat
- Coordinates: 41.3826°N 2.0891°E

Information
- Website: www.dsbarcelona.com

The German School of Barcelona (German: Deutsche Schule Barcelona, Spanish: Colegio Alemán Barcelona, ) is a German international school in Esplugues de Llobregat, Catalonia, Spain, in the Barcelona metropolitan area.

This private school aims to successfully integrate the German children with the Spanish ones, and these into the German schooling system, so that all pupils are enabled at the conclusion of school to speak both languages vernacularly. They are guided during a 12-year tuition program together, after which they are faced with a final examination named Abitur, which is recognized on a global level. For those who do not succeed or plan on going through the whole preparatory school, secondary or general school systems are also offered.

== Kindergarten ==
The German School of Barcelona also possesses a German-oriented kindergarten, in which children participate for three years. The preschoolers are divided in different groups according to their languages, with the main language being German. This institution aids the children in a social manner, and supports and develops their creative skills. In their third year children will participate in preschool-lessons. German knowledge is not required for acceptance.

== Elementary school ==
The school's elementary section lasts four years. German and Spanish or Catalan children are taught in the same classes and receive one daily hour of Spanish tuition. Special classes for those who appeal to Catalan lessons are available.

== Secondary and preparatory school ==
After a two-year-long survey (grades 5 and 6), the children are appointed to different educational levels: Gymnasium/preparatory school (grades 7–12), Realschule/simple secondary school (grades 7–10), or Hauptschule/general school (grades 7–9).

== New secondary school ==
At the German School of Barcelona, there is a special offering for pupils entering fifth grade that do not speak fluent German. They are sent to a special class were students with the same knowledge are found, so that they can arrive to the ideal German level quicker.

== Lessons for different languages ==
German and Spanish: Grades 1–12
English: Grades 5–12
Catalan: Grades 1–12 (until 9th grade obligatory)
French: Grades 9–12 (optional)

== Notable pupils ==
- Jordi Pujol
- Juan Antonio Samaranch
- Antoni Tàpies
- Òscar Tusquets
- Àlex Brendemühl
- Álvaro Soler
