= María Asunción Milá =

Spanish anti-death-penalty activist (1919–2026)

- Milá in 2023
- Born: 20 July 1919; Barcelona, Spain
- Died: 13 October 2026 (aged 107); Seville, Spain
- Occupation: Anti-death penalty activist
- Spouse: Manuel Salinas Benjumea (m. 1939; died 2006)
- Children: 12
- Relatives: Mercedes Milá (niece); Lorenzo Milá (nephew)

María Asunción Milá de Salinas (née Sagnier; 20 July 1919 – 13 October 2026) was a Spanish human rights activist and aristocrat known for her advocacy against the death penalty. She served as president of Amnesty International Spain in the 1980s, and co-founded the Spanish Association against the Death Penalty in 1976. She is best known for her long campaign persuading popes to ban the death penalty in the catechism, which was ultimately successful under Pope Francis in 2018. She was also an influential voice for the abolition of the death penalty leading up to the 1978 referendum for the Constitution of Spain.

== Biography ==
Milá was born on 20 July 1919 in Barcelona to a father who had been granted the title of Count. She married a Sevillian painter named Manuel Salinas Benjumea on 2 July 1939, and moved to Seville with him. She stated that she struggled to find a wedding location due to the recent ending of the Spanish Civil War. She and Manuel went on to have 12 sons born between 1940 and 1965.

She became an activist against the death penalty in March 1974 after hearing of the execution of Salvador Puig Antich. She has stated that this decision was due to her goal to "give life and defend life" and her view that "God didn't want" the death penalty. By 1976, she had co-founded the Spanish Association against the Death Penalty, which she served as the Secretary of. She went from ministry to ministry seeking to persuade people to support the abolition of the death penalty in the 1978 Spanish Constitution. She never officially registered the Association.

Milá was asked if she would support a law instead, as the military would not permit a total ban, but she instead went to meet the military and to meet Minister of Justice Landelino Lavilla, where she demanded it be included in the constitution. Ultimately, the persuasion succeeded, and the ban was included in the constitution. She subsequently served as president of Amnesty International Spain in the 1980s.

She began writing letters to popes around this time advocating for banning the death penalty in the catechism, and became more active in this in 1993 after more permissiveness towards the death penalty was considered. In 2015, one of her letters was personally delivered to Pope Francis with a message that she was not willing to die until the issue was resolved. He sent her a letter eight days later, informing her that he would assign Christoph Schönborn to analyzing the issue, and enclosed a rosary. She was cited as one of the main triggers of the 2018 Modification to the Catechism making the death penalty no longer permissible, and received a personal call from the Vatican informing her.

In 2016, she was honored by the University of Seville College of Law where she was called the "bishop's hammer".

Milá also advocated for women becoming priests. However, she espoused strongly anti-abortion views. She was against the Catalan independence movement, asserting that "Nationalism is a disease that destroys nations".

Milá died in Seville on 13 October 2026, at the age of 107.

== Personal life ==
Her husband died in 2006. Her eldest son Manuel de Salinas was also a painter and died at the age of 80 in January 2021 from COVID-19. She also outlived two of her other sons José María and Diego. She had 22 grandchildren. Her granddaughter Alejandra de Salinas married politician José María Michavila.

She was a Roman Catholic. She was the aunt of television presenters Mercedes Milá and Lorenzo Milá.
