= Atlantic Mediterranean Activities Conference =

The Atlantic Mediterranean Activities Conference (AMAC) is an international scholastic sports organization, made up of international schools along the Mediterranean Sea, as well as Portugal.

== Schools ==
Non-exhaustive list of member schools:

- Carlucci American International School of Lisbon (Portugal)
- American School of Barcelona (Spain)
- American School of Valencia (Spain)
- American Cooperative School of Tunis (Tunisia)
