= Mercedes Milá =

Spanish television presenter

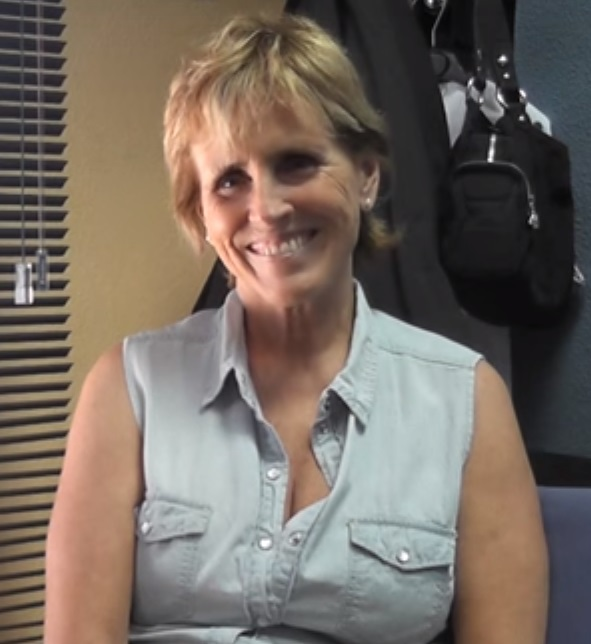
- Mercedes Milá in 2012
- Born: María Mercedes Milá Mencos; 5 April 1951 (age 75); Esplugues de Llobregat, Barcelona, Spain
- Occupations: Television presenter, journalist
- Years active: Early 1970s–present
- Relatives: Lorenzo Milá (brother); María Asunción Milá (aunt)

María Mercedes Milá Mencos (born 5 April 1951) is a Spanish television presenter and journalist, most notable for her work on Spain's Telecinco's Gran Hermano, the Spanish version of the reality television series Big Brother.

== Biography ==
Mercedes Milá was born in Esplugues de Llobregat on 5 April 1951, the daughter of José Luis Milá Sagnier, Count of Montseny and Mercedes Mencos, the eldest of six siblings (including newscaster Lorenzo Milà). She studied philosophy, but abandoned this and then studied journalism and arts in Barcelona, where she received a Bachelor's degree. She first worked as a journalist for El Correo de Andalucía, in Sevilla. Shortly afterwards she began working in the newsrooms of Spanish public broadcaster Televisión Española. She joined the sports division, where she remained between 1974 and 1978, when she was selected to co-host, with Isabel Tenaille, the talk show Dos por Dos ("Two by Two"). After the show was cancelled, Milá returned to radio. She worked with Iñaki Gabilondo at Cadena SER.

Milà's TV comeback came in 1982 with the program Buenas Noches ("Goodnight"), which became one of the hits of the season and lasted until 1984. Her personal style and directness with her guests helped her turn into one of the most popular Spanish TV personalities of the 1980s. After a brief stint with the Catalan television station TV3, and then back with TVE in 1990, she moved over to new private TV network Antena 3 in the early nineties, where she stayed until moving to private broadcaster Telecinco in 2000.

In 2000 she found renewed success as the host of the Spanish franchise of the hit reality show Gran Hermano, earning poor critical reviews but massive ratings. As of 2017, Milá has hosted fifteen of the seventeen regular seasons of the show (all except for season 3 in 2002 which was hosted by Pepe Navarro, and season 17 in 2016 which was hosted by Jorge Javier Vázquez) and two All Stars seasons.

In 2016 she hosted a TV program named Convénzeme, con Z de Zweig which motivates people to read.

In 2012 she published a book based on the blog she writes for Telecinco, called Lo que me sale del bolo.

In February 2019 she hosted the TV program Scott y Mila on Movistar+.

== Personal life ==
Her brother is newscaster and journalist Lorenzo Milá and her aunt was human rights activist María Asunción Milá.

== Shows ==
=== Televisión Española ===
- Polideportivo (1974–1978)
- Dos por dos (1978)
- Buenas noches (1982–1984)
- De jueves a jueves (1986)
- El martes que viene (1990)

=== TV3 ===
- Dilluns, dilluns (1988)

=== Antena 3 ===
- Queremos saber (1992–1993)
- Más que palabras (1995)
- Sin límites (1998)
- Queremos saber más (2002)

=== Telecinco ===
- Gran Hermano (2000–2015) (excluding Gran Hermano 3 and the VIP seasons)
- Diario de... (2004–2011)
- La tribu (2009) with Javier Sardá

=== Cuatro ===
- Diario de... (2011–)
- El comecocos (2011) as a judge
