= American School of Barcelona =

Location
- Esplugues de Llobregat, Barcelona; Catalonia; 41.3837°N 2.0844°E

Information
- Type: International school
- Established: 1962
- Head of school: Mark Pingitore
- Grades: K-12
- Enrollment: 900+
- Mascot: Iberian lynx
- ECC Principal: Cristina Torrengo
- Elementary School Principal: Kristen MacConnell
- Secondary School Principal: Omar Ugalde
- Middle School Principal: Robyn Chapel
- Website: www.asbarcelona.com

The American School of Barcelona (ASB) is an American international school in Esplugues de Llobregat, Catalonia, Spain, in the Barcelona metropolitan area.

== Overview ==
The American School of Barcelona (ASB) is a private, non-profit, coeducational day school for students aged 3 to 18, located in the greater Barcelona metropolitan area. It was the first and remains the largest trilingual school in the region. ASB offers a university preparatory curriculum that enables graduates to access American, Spanish, and international universities.

ASB is accredited by the Middle States Association of Colleges and Schools and the International Baccalaureate Organization (IBO). It is officially recognized in Spain as a Centro Extranjero (foreign school) by both the Generalitat de Catalunya and the Spanish Ministry of Education. The school receives support from the U.S. Department of State’s Office of Overseas Schools and is a member of the European Council of International Schools (ECIS). It also participates in the European Sports Conference (ESC), a regional sports league (IBERIA), and maintains strong ties with other international schools in Spain and the Mediterranean.

All students graduate with an American high school diploma. Many also pursue the Co-validation Program, which prepares them for the Spanish university entrance exams. A majority of students opt for the International Baccalaureate (IB) Diploma Programme, which grants access to universities in Spain and internationally. Since beginning to offer the IB Diploma in 2009, ASB has consistently scored above the global average. In the 2025-26 academic year, ASB began offering the International Baccalaureate (IB) Careers-related Programme.

== Faculty ==
The ASB staff includes 159 teachers and associate teachers, 34 operations staff, and 10 leadership staff. The approximate composition of faculty by nationality is:

- North American 53%
- English speaking countries 7%
- Spanish 27%
- Other 13%

More than half of the staff members have advanced degrees.

== Program ==
The school curriculum is American-based. In upper level classes, and until this year, the school offered two curricular options: the Spanish national convalidation Selectividad program (which also granted the Spanish Diploma to students) or the American Diploma one. Starting the 2007-08 academic year, ASB has also offered the International Baccalaureate (IB Diploma). It is one of the only that offers this diploma in Barcelona in English. The language of instruction is English, except for courses offered in Spanish or Catalan. Staff specialties range from Counseling to Learning Disabilities and the school offers many special programs and extracurricular activities: dance, drama, PE, newspaper, student council, community service, soccer, and basketball. Furthermore, it offers the following examinations: MAP, PSAT, Selectividad and IB.

- Community and students

Current enrollment is 975 students. ASB students come from 60 countries, with the most represented being Spain, the US, the UK, France, Canada and the Netherlands. Composition by nationality is approximately 30% American (at least one parent from North America), 20% Spanish (both parents Spanish), and 50% international.

=== Governance ===
The school is owned and operated by The American School of Barcelona, Fundación Privada. Governance is overseen by a Board of Trustees composed of both internal and external members of the school community.

=== Academic Calendar ===
The school year consists of 181 teacher contract days and 175 instructional days. Semester I is from August to December/January, and Semester II runs from January/February to June.

== Notable alumni ==
- Jordi Cruyff, Professional Futbol Player
- Claudia Bassols, Actress
- Ivana Baquero, Actress
- Nikias Molina, Consumer Technology Influencer
