= Xavier Corberó =

Catalan artist

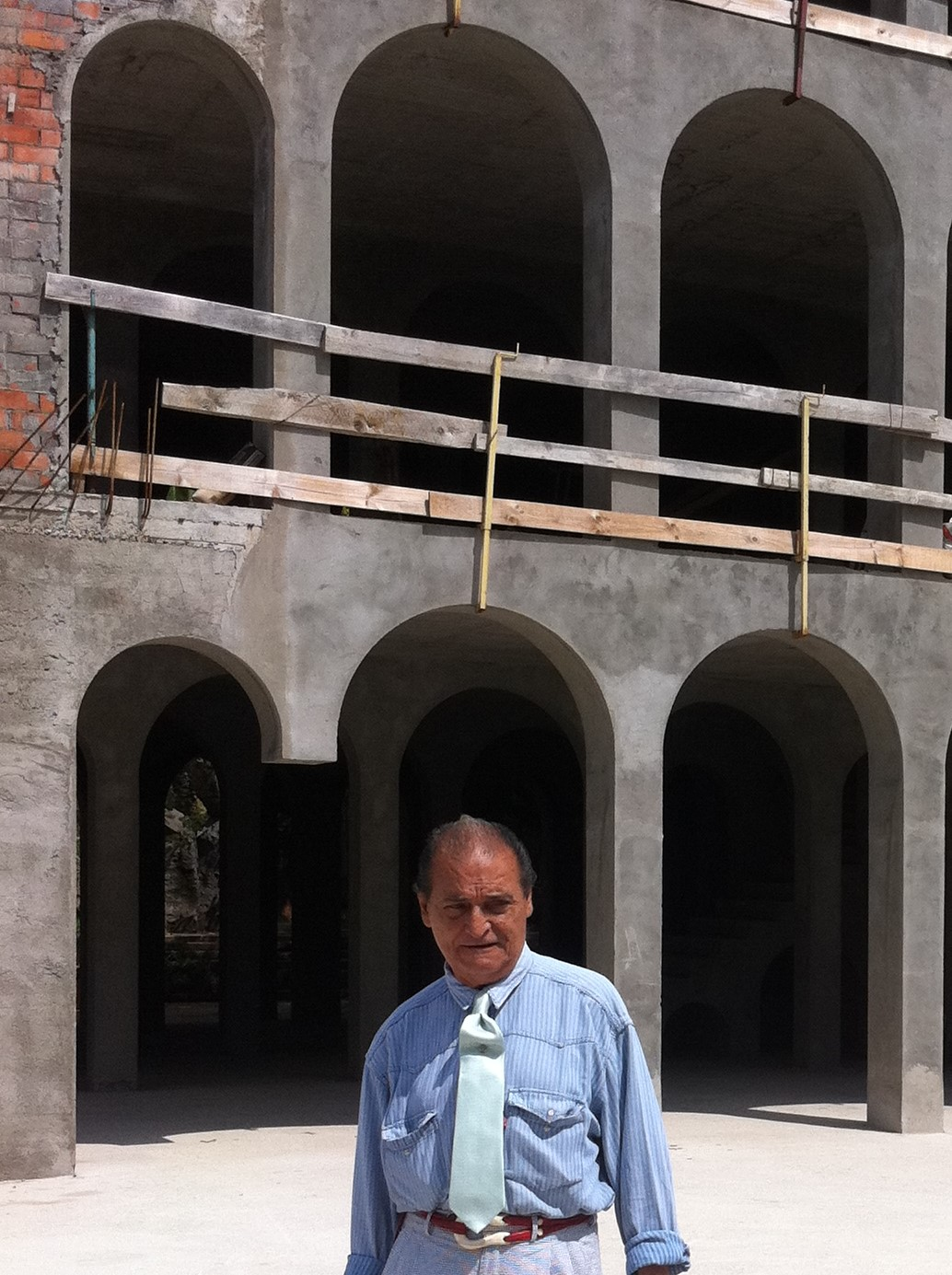
- Corberó in 2011, during construction of his house in Esplugues de Llobregat
- Born: 13 June 1935; Barcelona, Catalonia, Spain
- Died: 24 April 2017 (aged 81); Sant Joan Despí, Catalonia, Spain

Xavier Corberó i Olivella (13 June 1935 – 24 April 2017) was a prominent Catalan artist, best known for monumental public sculpture and his palatial house complex in Esplugues de Llobregat near Barcelona. He has been described as "widely considered the most important Catalan artist since Gaudí," as "one of Spain’s most celebrated sculptors" and as having "perhaps influenced Barcelona more than any artist since Gaudí."

== Family background ==
Corberó's patrilineal family has its roots in Lleida, in the home region of Saint Peter Claver whose 16th-century mother was born Ana Corberó. The family held a tradition of metalworking, especially in bronze. Corberó's grandfather Pere Corberó i Casals (1875–1959) was an entrepreneur and artist whose works included the bronze memorial on the birthplace of Enrique Granados, also in Lleida. He was a cofounder of Barcelona's association for the promotion of decorative arts, a precursor to the Design Museum, now known as the Foment de les Arts i el Disseny. The Corberó foundry produced sculptures by prominent Catalan sculptors of the time such as Pablo Gargallo, Josep Viladomat and Frederic Marès. It was also an industrial and commercial business that sold bronze doors, chandeliers, fountains, and other decorative items, with a showroom in downtown Barcelona at Rambla de Catalunya 105, in a building designed by Arnau Calvet i Peyronill, and a workshop nearby at Carrer Aribau 103.

Pere's son and Corberó's father, Xavier Corberó i Trepat (1901–1981), also worked in the family bronze workshop. Together with his brother Valeri Corberó i Trepat, a noted interior designer and decorator, he was one of the co-founders of the Escola Massana art school in Barcelona.

During the Spanish Civil War Xavier Corberó i Trepat fought in the Spanish Republican Armed Forces and was thus separated from his family. Corberó's mother Montserrat, born Olivella i Vidal, died in 1936 while giving birth to his younger brother, who in turn died from smallpox a few years later.

== Biography ==
Corberó lived his childhood through the turmoil and scarcity of the civil war and early years of Francoist Spain. In 1950 he enrolled at Escola Massana, and in 1953 volunteered for military service in the Spanish Air Force. In 1955 he lived briefly in Paris and Stockholm, then until 1959 in London where he was the first-ever Spanish student at the Central School of Arts and Crafts. He then went on to work for a while in Lausanne.

In Barcelona in the early 1960s he befriended Ricardo Bofill, Antonio Gades, Luis Marsans, and Manuel Viola. In 1962 he moved to New York City at Viola's suggestion. There he spent time with such prominent artists as Marcel Duchamp, Max Ernst and Man Ray, before moving back to Barcelona in the mid-1960s. In the ensuing years he immersed himself further in the artistic community of Barcelona and Cadaqués, developing a close friendship with Salvador Dalí (whom he described as his "first patron") as well as with Jorge Castillo, Robert Llimós, Josep Llorens i Artigas, Roberto Matta, Joan Miró, Elsa Peretti, Joan Ponç, and Josep Lluís Sert among others. By the early 1970s he was printing etchings on behalf of Miró and producing jewelry for Peretti in his Esplugues workshop. Around that time he also met the British landscape architect Russell Page, of whom he viewed himself as a disciple. From the mid-1970s he again spent extended periods in New York, where his circle included Claes Oldenburg, Richard Serra, Donald Sultan, Bryan Hunt, Beverly Pepper, Vincent Desiderio, Kenneth Frampton, and Robert Hughes.

Corberó married actress Mary-Ann Bennett in 1958. Their daughter Ana Corberó was born in 1960. They separated in the early 1970s, at a time when Corberó was in a relationship with Italian model Elsa Peretti whom he had helped become a jewelry designer. In 1983 he married Maria Luisa Tiffón. In his later life he was in a relationship with Maria Dolors (Midu) Rica, whom he had known in 1973.

Corberó died in April 2017, aged 81, and was buried at Montjuïc Cemetery in Barcelona.

== Work and recognition ==
Corberó had his first metal sculptures exhibited in 1955 at the third Hispano-American Biennial Exhibition. He participated in successive sessions of the avant-garde Saló de maig exhibition in Barcelona and won awards there in 1960 and 1961. He had his first individual exhibition in Munich in 1963, for which he received a Gold Medal from the State of Bavaria. Later solo exhibitions included shows at the Art Institute of Chicago (1964), Staempfli Gallery in New York (1966, 1975, 1980), Meadows Museum in Dallas (1980), and McNay Art Museum in San Antonio (1985).

Corberó's monumental sculptures can be seen in many places of Catalonia that include Barcelona, Esplugues de Llobregat, El Prat de Llobregat, Sabadell, Terrassa, Cassà de la Selva. Others are in Palma de Mallorca, Santa Cruz de Tenerife, London, Beirut, Dubai, Chicago, as well as in numerous museums such as the Meadows Museum in Dallas, the Nassau County Museum of Art, the Stedelijk Museum Amsterdam, the Victoria and Albert Museum, and the Metropolitan Museum of Art.

While sculpture was Corberó's dominant medium, together with architecture for his house, he also produced whimsical drawings, abstract paintings, and poems in Catalan.

Following the return of democracy in Spain and the corresponding blossoming of cultural activity in Barcelona, culminating in the 1992 Summer Olympics, and jointly with New York art dealer Joseph A. Helman, Corberó successfully encouraged his prominent artist friends to donate monumental sculptures as a participation to the city's renewal, at almost no cost to the city other than that of the sculptures' materials. That initiative brought Roy Lichtenstein's "El Cap de Barcelona" on the Port Vell waterfront, Claes Oldenburg's "Matches" in Vall d'Hebron, Richard Serra's "Wall" on Plaça de la Palmera, Beverly Pepper's "Cielo caído" and "Espiral arbolada" in the Parc de l'Estació del Nord, Bryan Hunt's "Rites of Spring" in the Parc del Clot, and Anthony Caro's "Alto Rhapsody" in the Parc de l'Espanya Industrial. He was also the designer of the 1992 Olympic medals, for which on his insistence real gold was used for the first time.

In 1992 he received the Creu de Sant Jordi Award from the Generalitat de Catalunya, in recognition of his role in Barcelona's public sculpture program. In 2000 he became a member of the Reial Acadèmia Catalana de Belles Arts de Sant Jordi.

== Espai Corberó ==
In 1968, Corberó started acquiring land, including a former potato farm, bordering Montserrat Street in the Barcelona suburb of Esplugues de Llobregat, not far from where his parents lived. He developed it into a highly elaborate complex of spaces, known as of 2022 as "Corberó's space" (Catalan: Espai Corberó). While Corberó was alive, the property was partly devoted to hosting artists-in-residence as well as his own home. The sprawling compound includes a significant share of his life's work and personal collections, and he kept building it up until his death.

The Espai Corberó ensemble includes two historic houses, Can Cargol and Can Bialet, the former of which he restored in 1970–1971 with the help of architect and builder Emilio Bofill, who was also involved in the early stages of construction of the main complex across Montserrat Street. Corberó's visually striking house has been featured as background stage in multiple occasions, including Woody Allen's film Vicky Cristina Barcelona in 2008 and The New Yorker's "Goings on About Town" section in 2020. Lluís Lleó, an artist and acquaintance of Corberó, described it as "a self-portrait".

In July 2022, it was reported that Corberó's heirs would sell the complex to the municipality of Esplugues for development as a cultural property. It opened to visitors on 18 May 2024, on the occasion of International Museum Day.

== Gallery ==
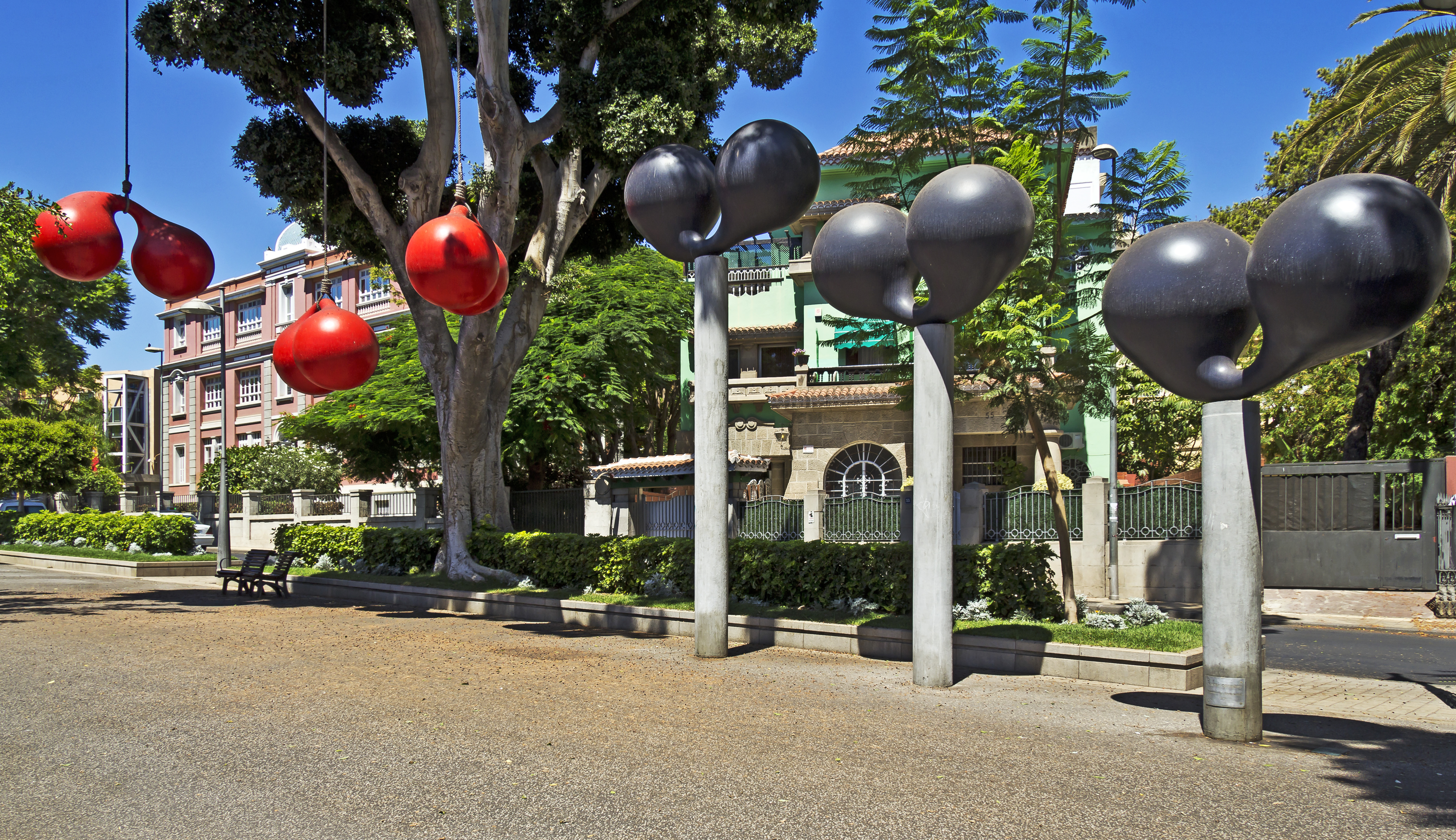
"Ejecutores y ejecutados", Santa Cruz de Tenerife (1973)

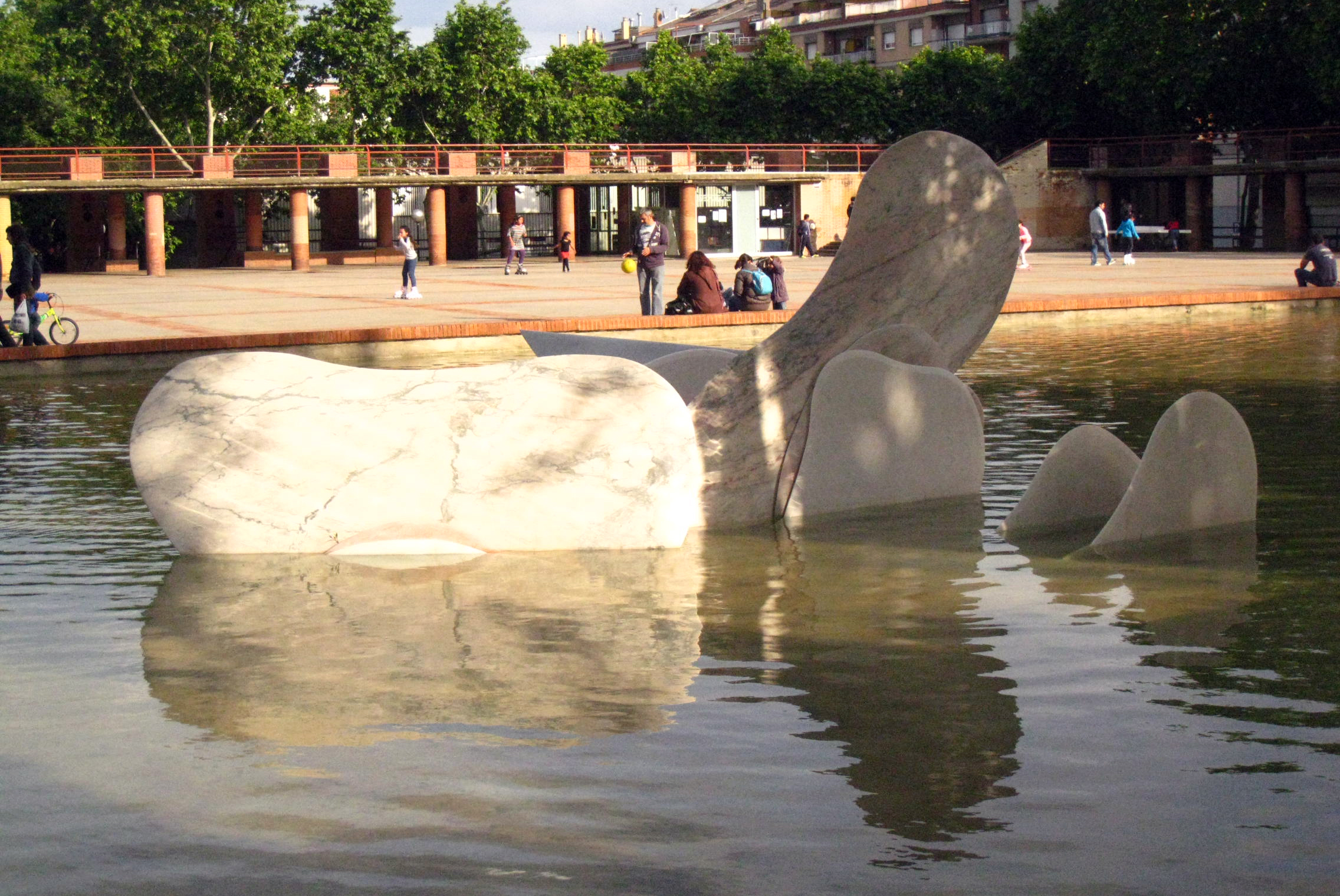
"Homage to the Mediterranean", Sóller Square, Barcelona (1983)

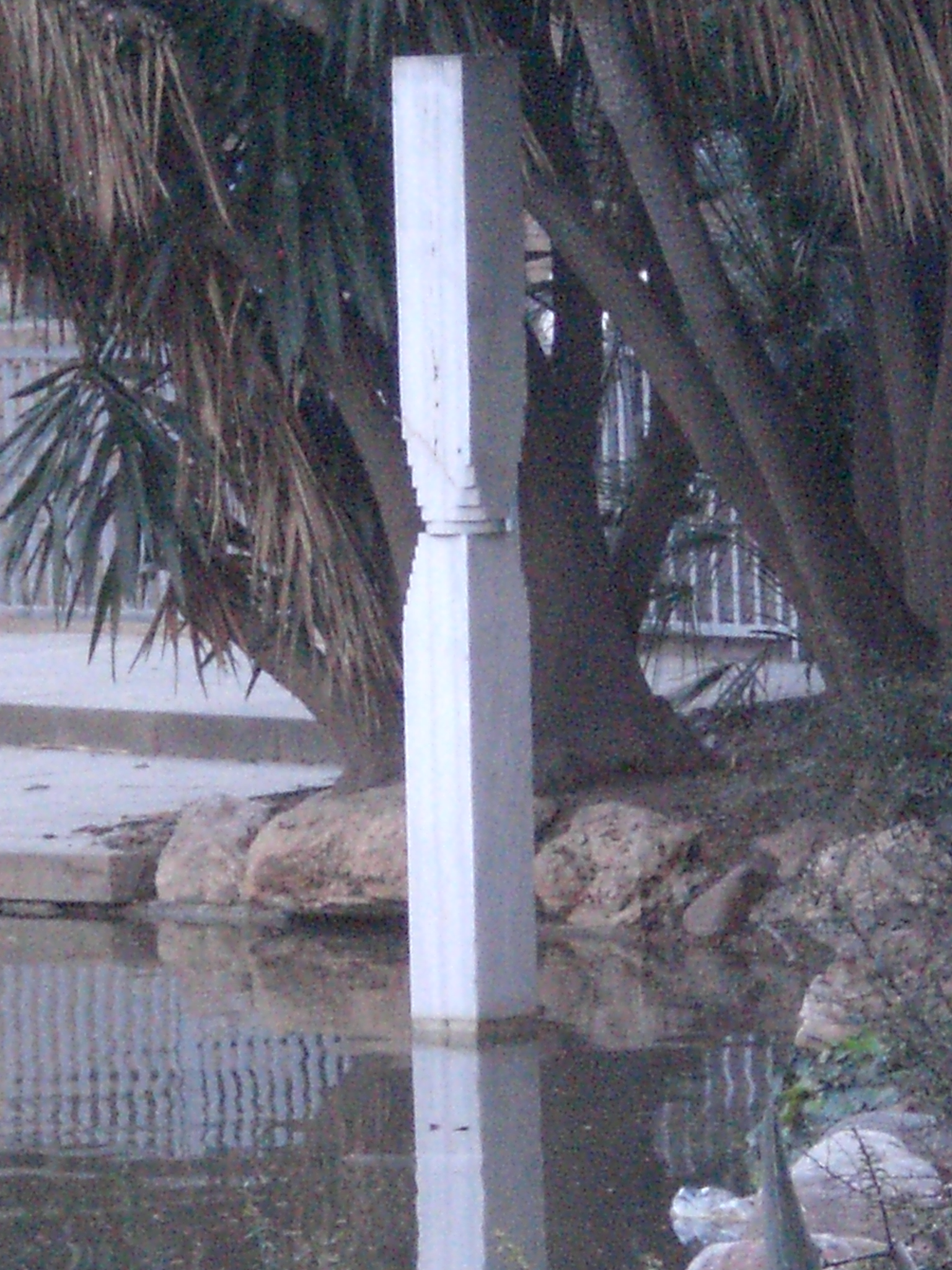
Monument to Nicolau Maria Rubió i Tudurí, Gaudí Square, Barcelona (1983)

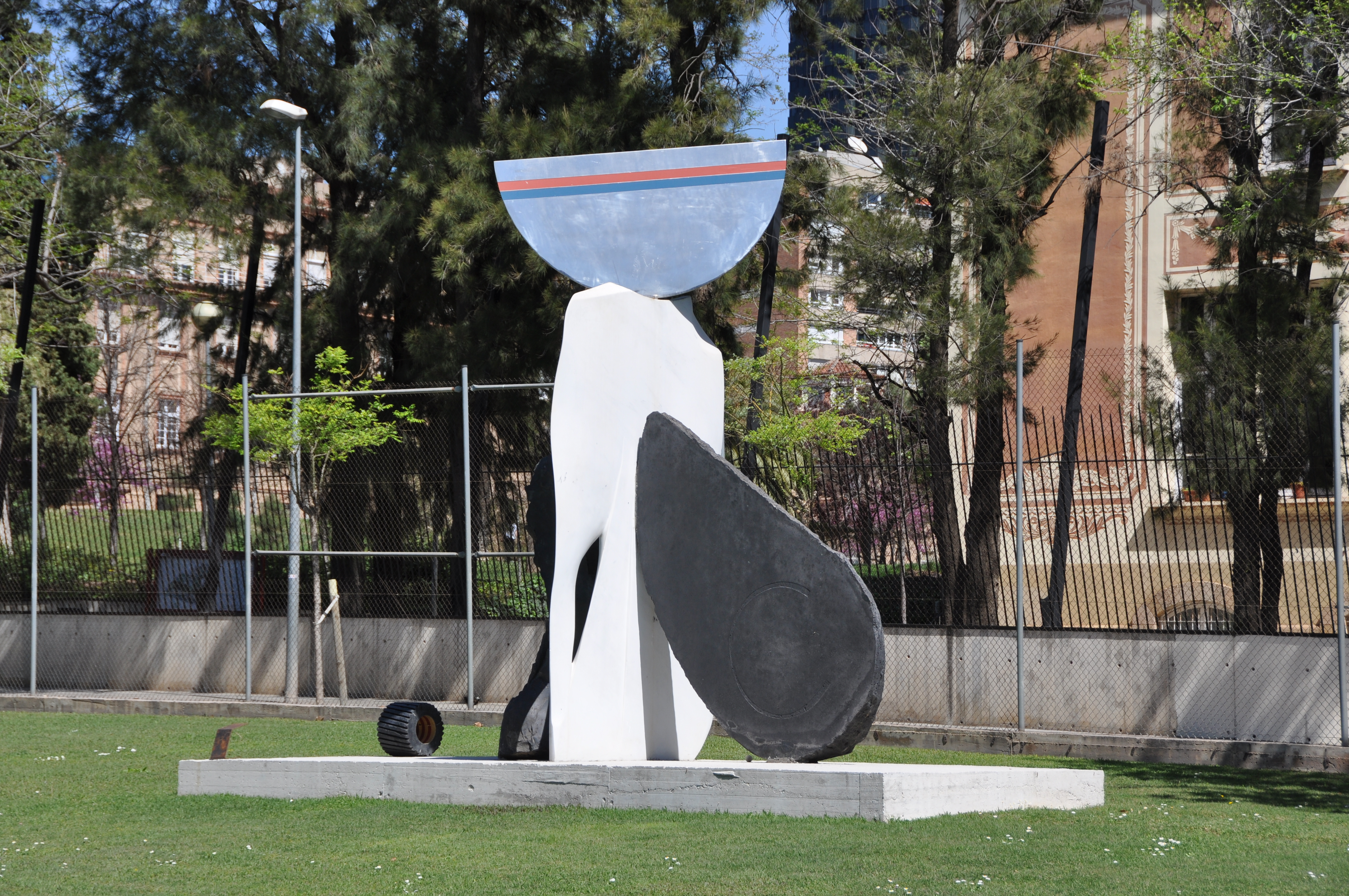
"La Barca del Barça", grounds of the FC Barcelona (1987)

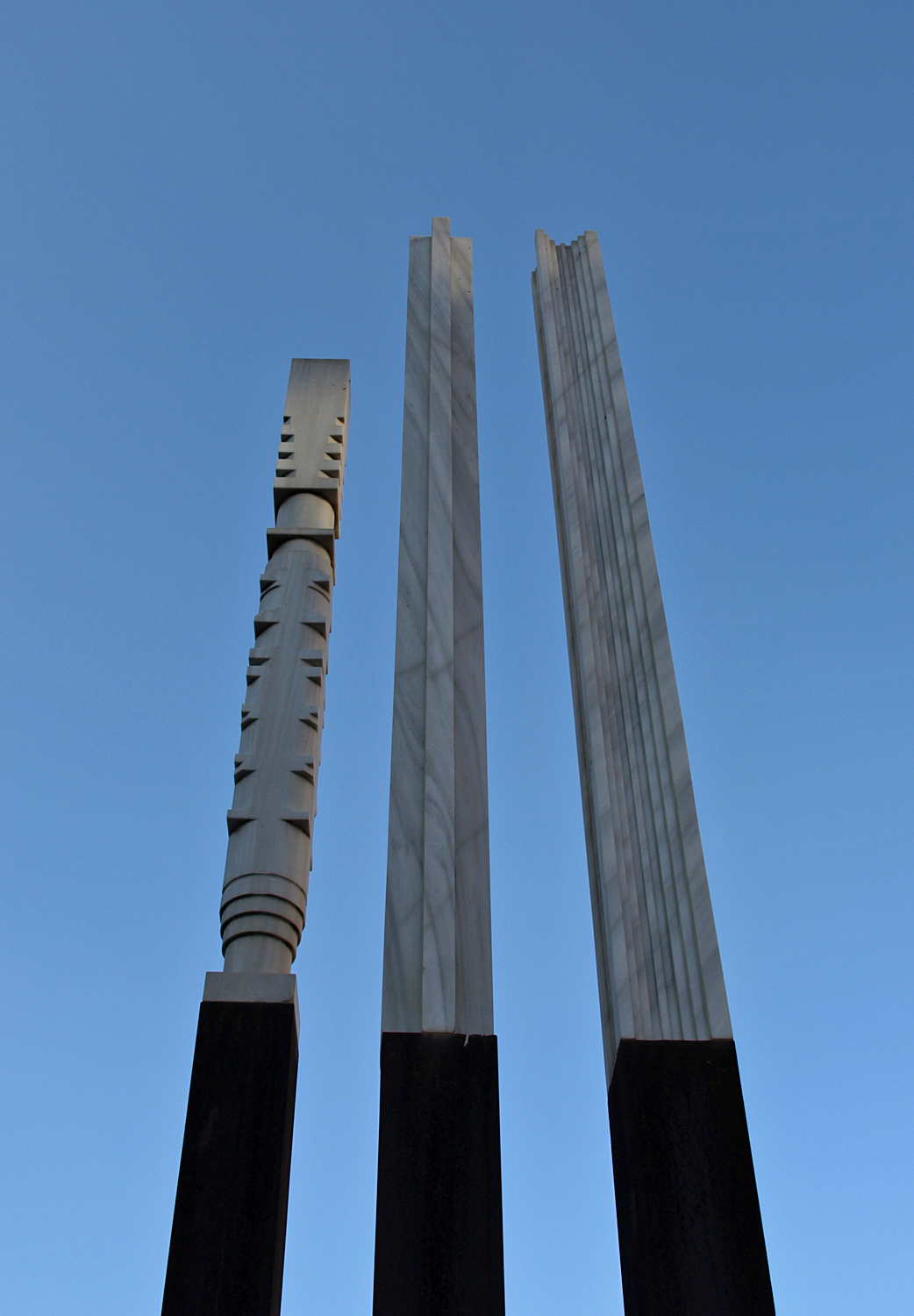
"Columnes de Terme", Kennedy Square, Barcelona (1988)

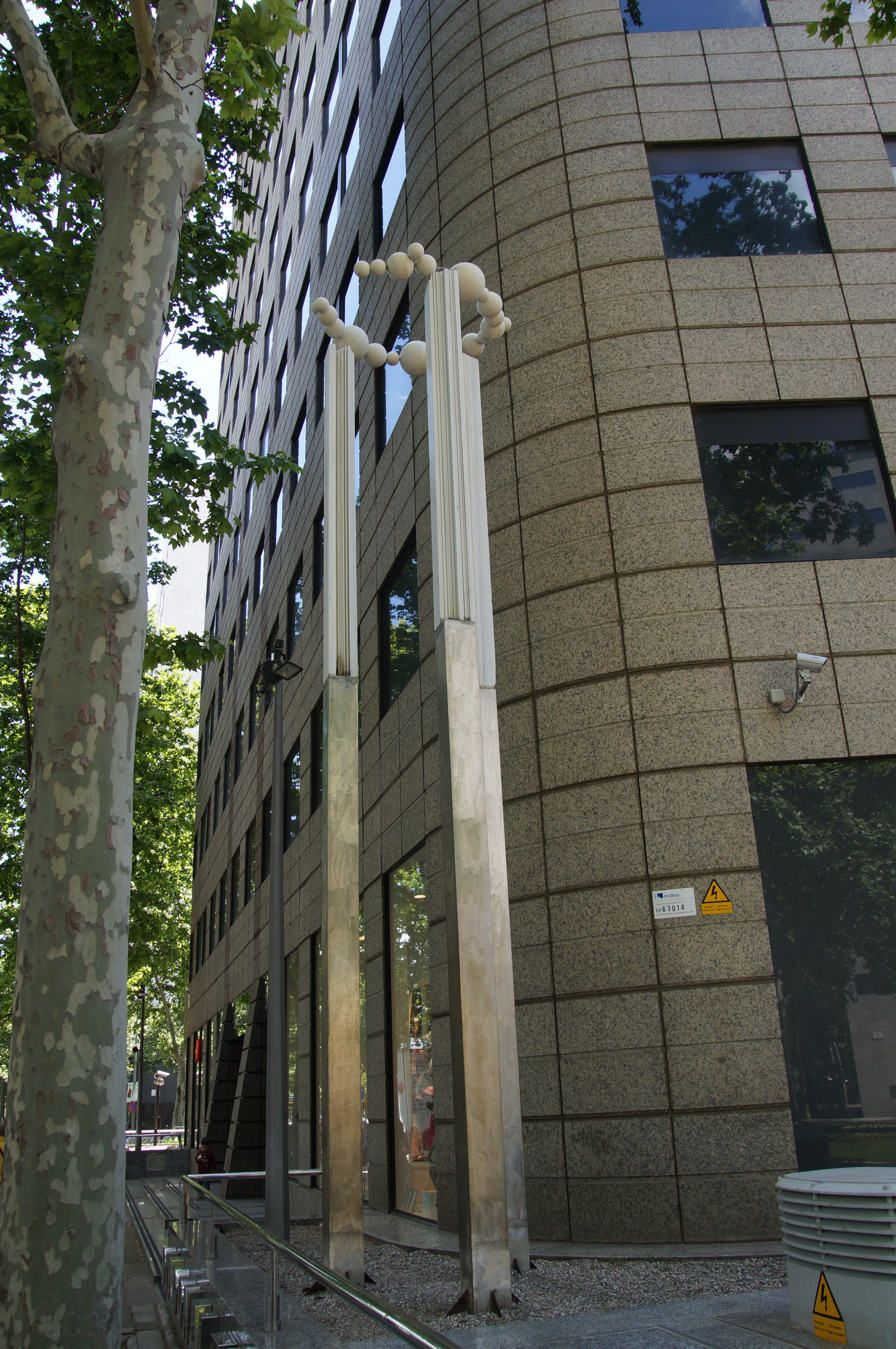
"Allegory of life", Avinguda Diagonal, Barcelona (1988)

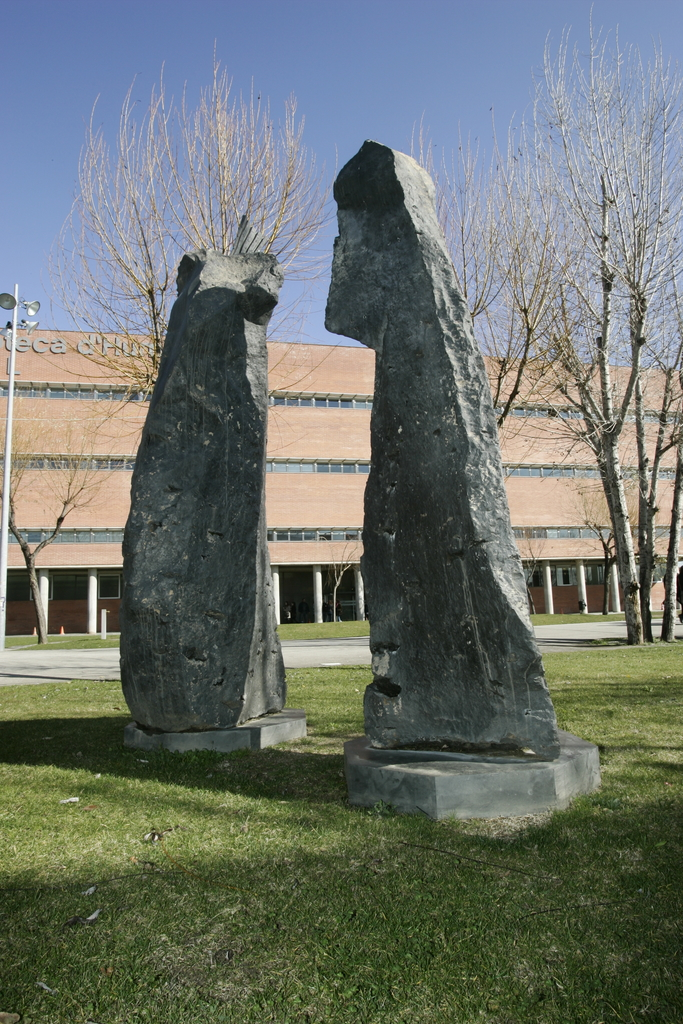
"King and Queen", UAB Campus, Sabadell (1988)

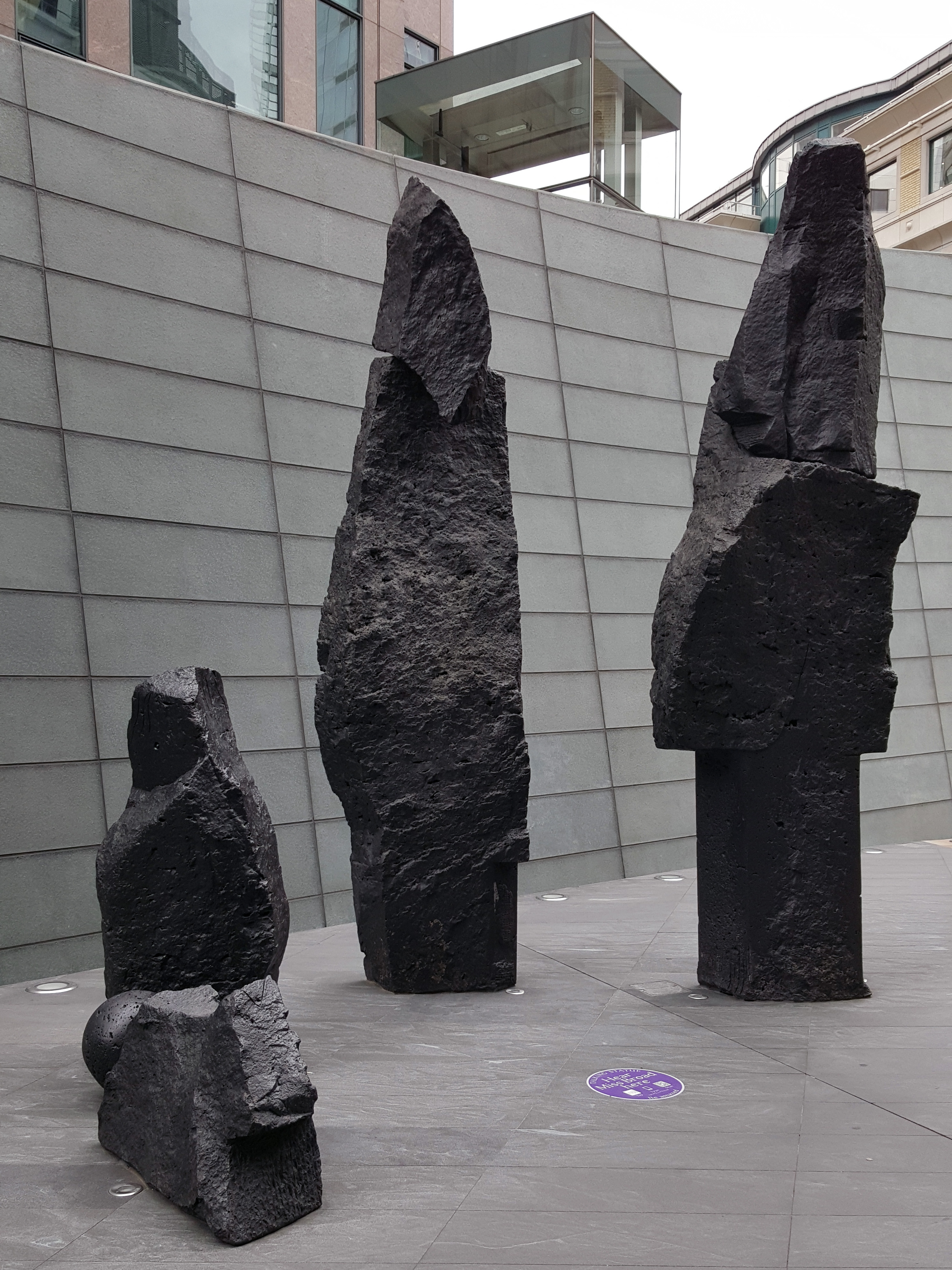
"The Broad Family", Broadgate, London (1991)

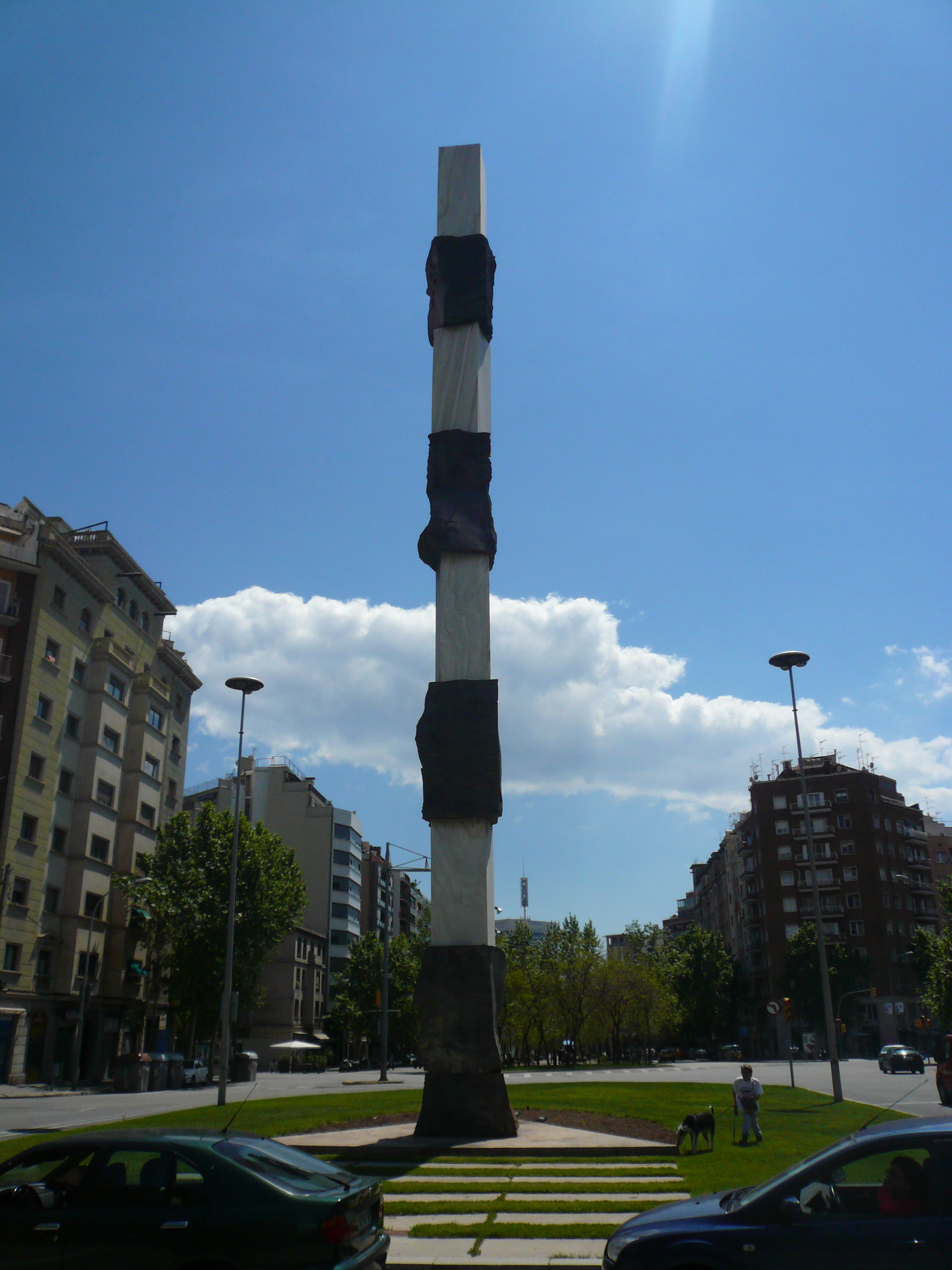
Monument to Josep Tarradellas, Tarradellas Avenue, Barcelona (1999)

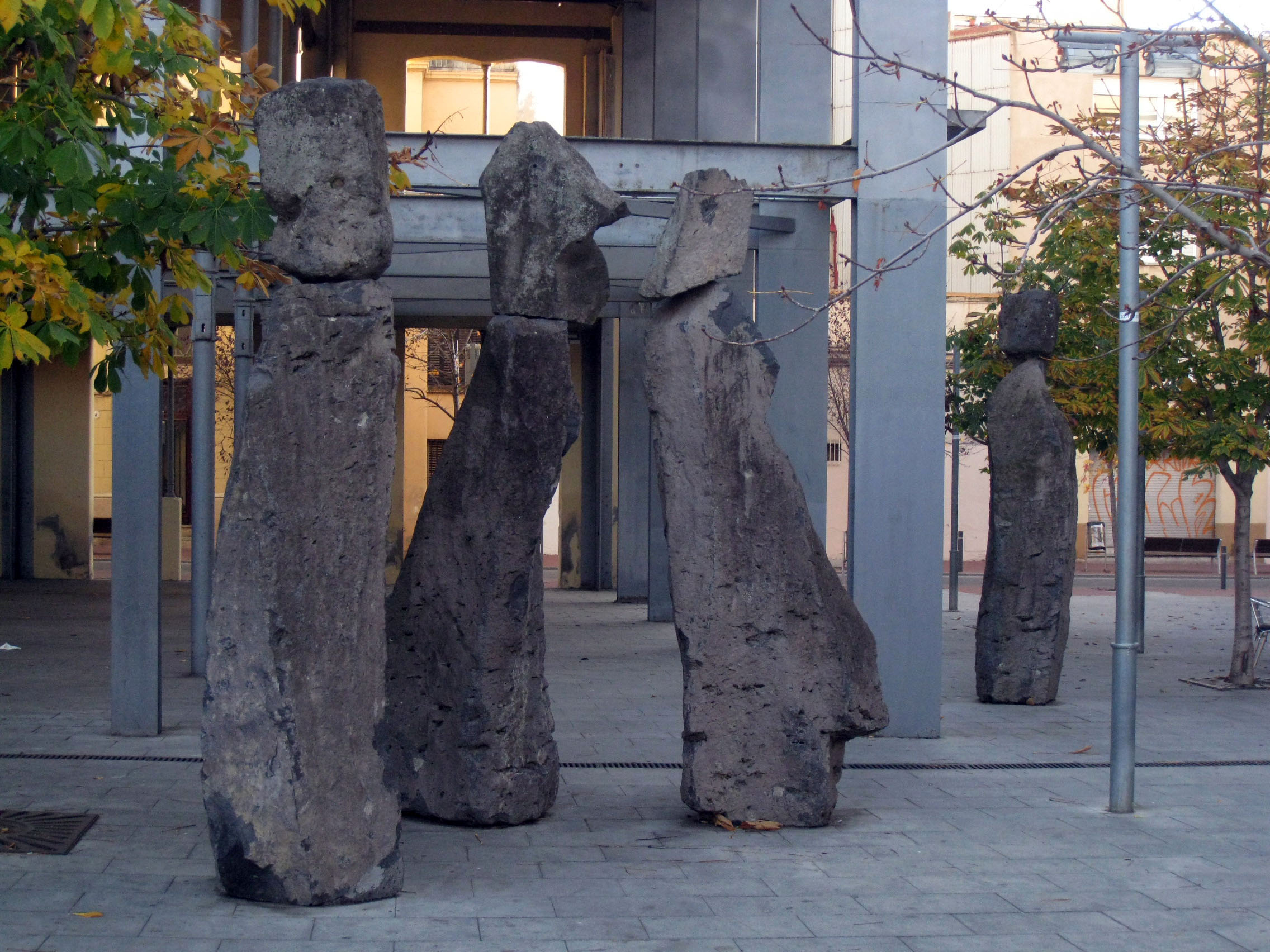
"La Familia Vapor", Terrassa (2002)

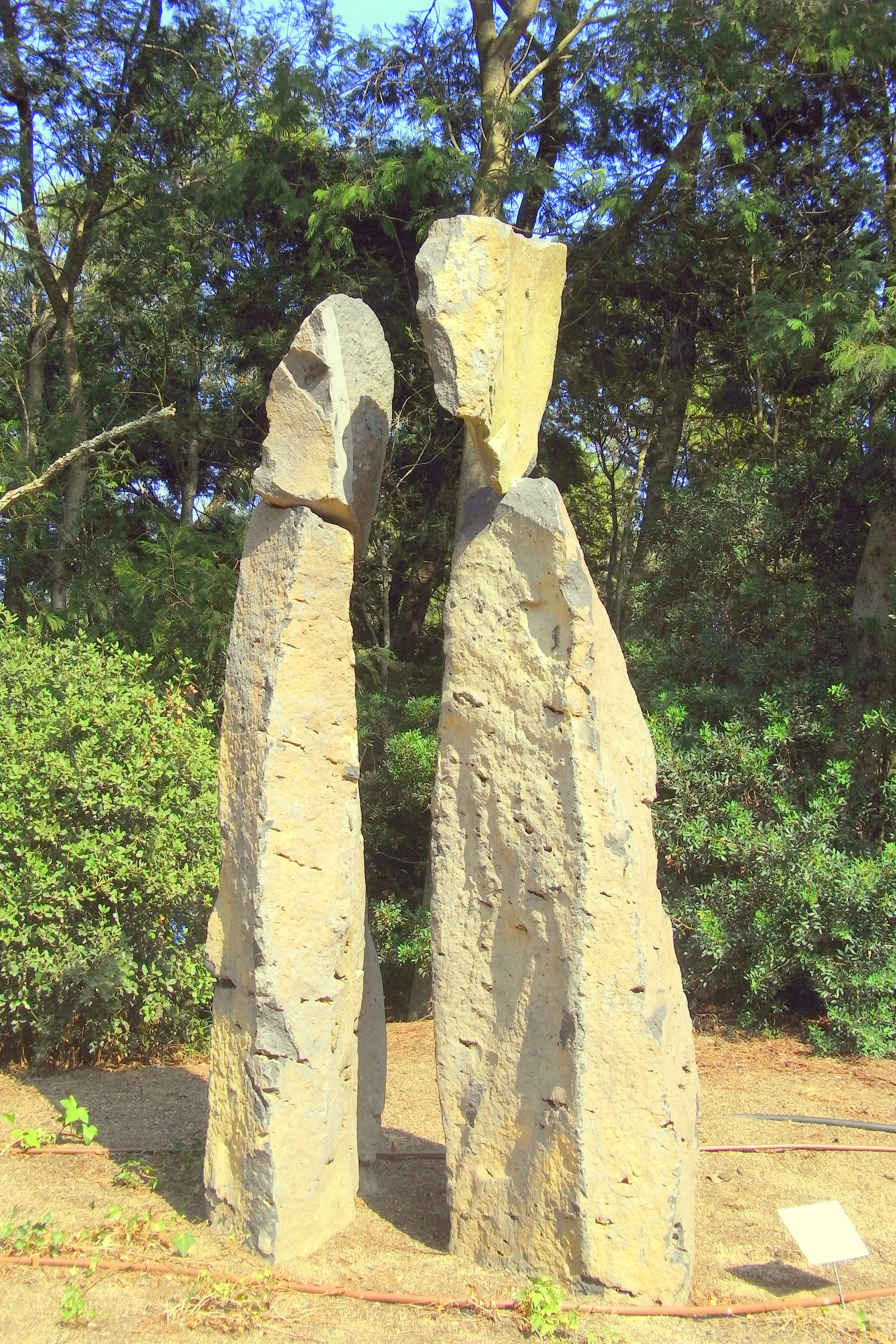
"Dos artistas flamencas", Jardíns de Cap Roig in Calella de Palafrugell (2003)

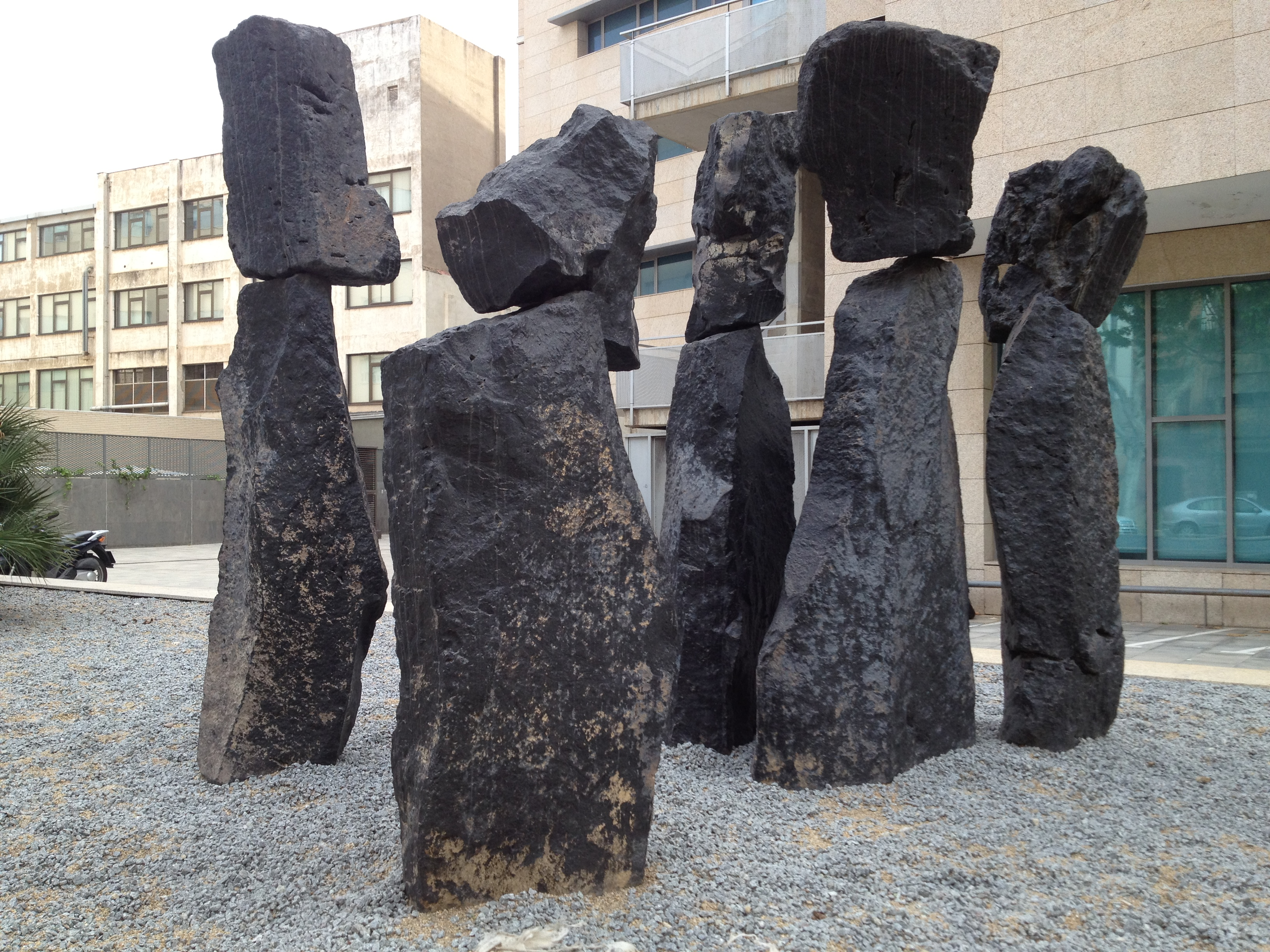
"La Familia", Poblenou, Barcelona (2003)

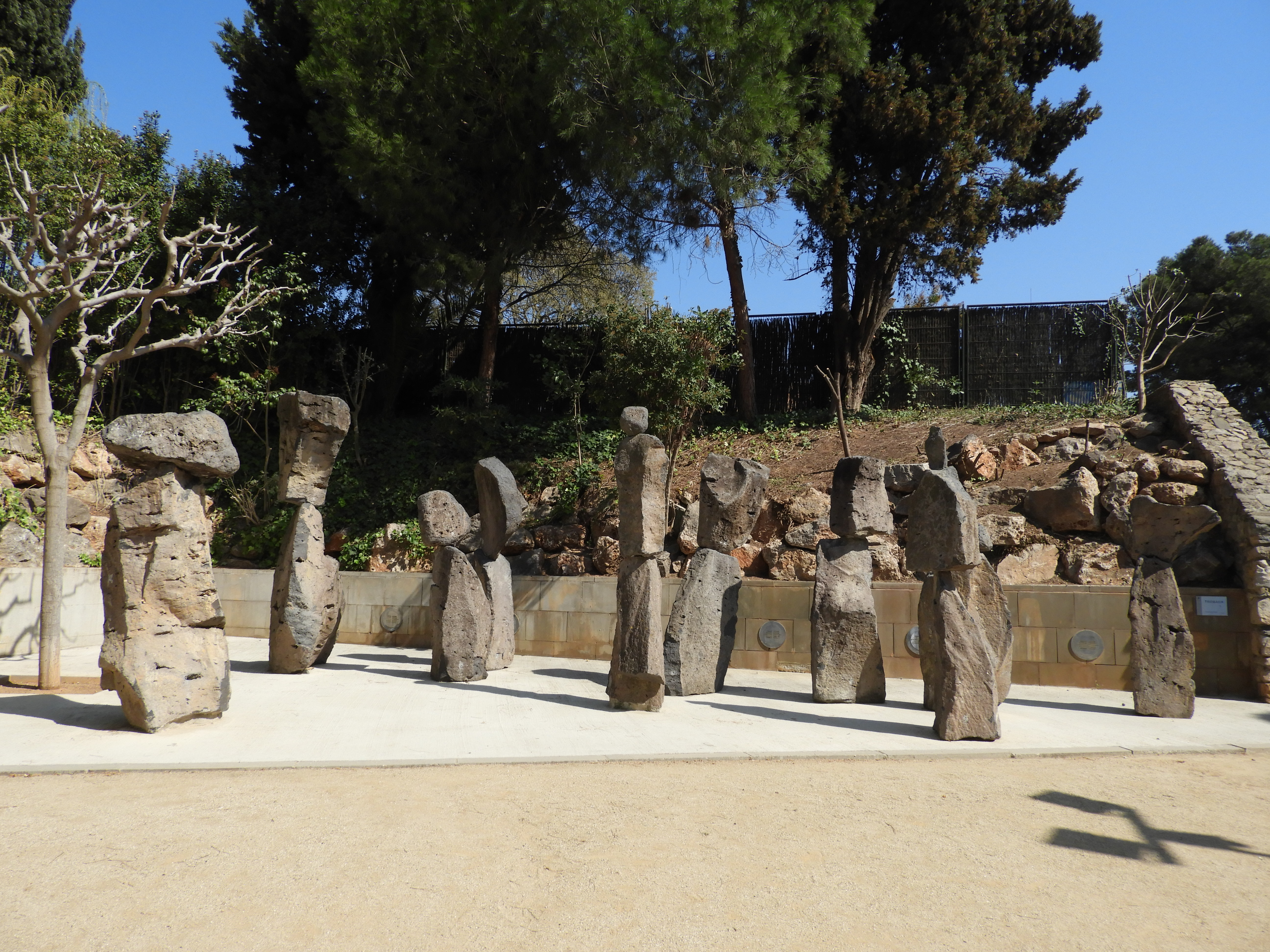
"Trobada", Esplugues de Llobregat (2005)
