= Ana Corberó =

Catalan artist (born 1961)

- Born: 1961 (age 64–65); Barcelona, Spain
- Known for: Painting, Drawing, Sculpture, Design, Poetry
- Notable work: 1001 Tears; Little Buddha, Buddhito & Buddhette; Postcards for Every Occasion

Ana Corberó is a Catalan visual artist whose work includes paintings, sculptures, and design.

Born in 1961, the daughter of Catalan sculptor Xavier Corberó, she studied in the United States (Dallas, Philadelphia, New York City) and has lived in London, Barcelona, Paris and Beirut. In 1996 she married Nabil Gholam, the Beirut-based architect.

Her figurative works display a sensitivity to the fragility of nature and the delicate relation between humans and their environment, as well as the variety and complexity of people's inheritances from family, culture, and history. The innocence and simultaneous lucidity of childhood is a theme that runs throughout her creations.

Among her landmark creations are large paintings of water surfaces (the 1001 Tears series); colossal sculptures of contemplative, childlike figures (Little Buddha, Buddhito and Buddhette) which have been exhibited in various public urban settings; the Postcards for Every Occasion print series; and the Maus Haus design creations.

Since 2010, and as a direct result of the Israeli/Lebanese war of 2006 Corberó has published two collections of poems: Prickly Pear Poems and Pettered Patter Poems.

In 2013 she held a solo exhibition, I&I = Us, at the Beirut Exhibition Center, conveying a pacifist message. It had taken her 18 months to put together.

She has had individual exhibitions in such places as London, Barcelona, Madrid, New York City, Dallas, Istanbul, Beirut, Napa Valley, Tokyo and Singapore.

== Works ==
Ana Corberó's works share a same taste of vocabulary. For a long time, this artist has built up a language of elements such as space illusions, pedestals and lights as verbs. Some elements appear rediscovered or reconfigured and they are clouds, gaping holes and plants. She also sees her work religious too but in this context this means psychological and emotional constructs and archetypes and such but not only one agenda. Creative and numinous drives come at second but religion is the first priority to her. On asking Marcel Duchamp, he explained that her work is not nostalgic. This art is more of a shamanistic activity. Its aim is to create consciousness. Her work is based on knowledge and observation.This break from the Modern tradition, is again no revivalist arts & crafts position, but rather a universal understanding of the profound value and rarity of synthetic knowledge
