= Association of Mature American Citizens =

Advocacy organization and interest group

AMAC, Inc.
- Formation: 2007
- CEO: Rebecca Weber
- Website: amac.us

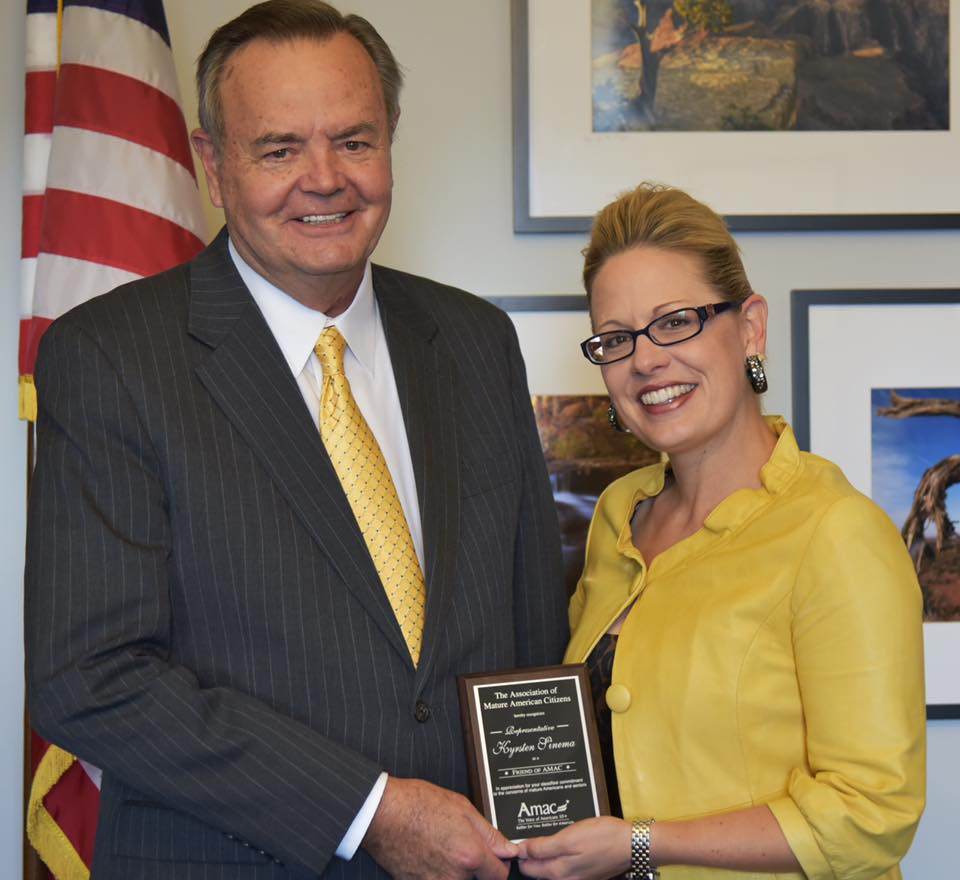
Congressmember Kyrsten Sinema receiving the Friend of Mature Americans Award in 2016.

The Association of Mature American Citizens (AMAC) is a United States-based conservative advocacy organization and interest group, founded in 2007. It was founded by Daniel C. Weber, a retired insurance agency owner, who also served as its president.

AMAC is a membership organization for people aged 50 and over. The group calls itself "the conservative alternative to the AARP." It is one of several organizations to position itself as a conservative rival to the AARP; others include the American Seniors Association and 60 Plus Association.

== Political activities ==
AMAC describes itself as "vigorously conservative" and gained support from talk show host Glenn Beck and other conservative figures. AMAC strongly opposes the Affordable Care Act (ACA) and has pushed for its repeal. In March 2014, AMAC claimed a membership of 1.1 million members, up from 40,000 in 2008, which it attributed to backlash over the ACA.

AMAC supports a plan for Social Security which would gradually increase the earliest retirement age to 64 (from 62) and "guarantee cost-of-living increases in a tiered structure based on income." AMAC supports the oil and gas industry, claiming that they "are safer for the environment than ever before." The group's president, Dan Weber, called for a rollback of Obama administration policies that promote clean energy.

The AMAC has a volunteer "delegate" program, aiming to select an AMAC member in each congressional district across the country to meet and lobby members of Congress.

In February 2017 AMAC issued a warning to the upcoming 2017 Academy Awards ceremony to not tolerate speeches against President Donald Trump, threatening to launch a boycott of theaters.

Political analyst Josh Bernstein is currently a national spokesperson for AMAC, which sponsors his weekly political talk show.

In the summer of 2024, AMAC paid for advertising that claimed 2.7 million illegal votes would be cast in the upcoming 2024 presidential election.

== Better For America Podcast ==
In November 2020 AMAC CEO Rebecca Weber launched the Better For America Podcast. The podcast is generally formatted as a discussion between Weber and a variety of conservative public figures about topics which are popular in right-wing and far-right circles. Episode topics include Great Replacement theory, Cultural Marxism, the US border crisis, "Gender Ideology", as well as current news and events. Guests have included Jack Posobiec, James Lindsay, Sebastian Gorka, Kari Lake, Kristi Noem, and Tom Homan.

The show also has recurring episodes co-hosted by Weber and Robert B. Charles, a lawyer who served as Assistant Secretary of State for International Narcotics and Law Enforcement Affairs from October 2003 to March 2005.
