= 1936 Catalan coup attempt =

Attempted Catalan coup of 1936
- Part of the Spanish Civil War and the interwar period
Date	November 1936
Location	Catalonia, Spain
Result	Coup prevented

Belligerents
Generalitat de Catalunya; CNT-FAI	Estat Català

Commanders and leaders
Lluís Companys; Josep Tarradellas; Dionís Eroles; Artemi Aiguader; Aurelio Fernández; Joans Solans	Josep Maria Xammar; Joan Casanovas; Andreu Revertés; Manuel Blasi; Joan Torres-Picart; Joan Cornudella

Strength
Generalitat troops, CNT militia	EC militia and other formations

The Catalan coup d'etat was an unsuccessful takeover of power in autonomous Catalonia, planned by the independentist party Estat Català. The conspirators intended to declare the total independence of Catalonia as a state neutral in the Spanish Civil War, and to marginalize all non-aligned political groupings, especially the Anarchists. They counted on party militias and Catalan army and security units, infiltrated by the Estat Català militants. The coup was planned in November, as the plotters assumed that the central Republican government, absorbed by the battle of Madrid, would not be able to take action. The plot failed because of the Anarchist counter-action, which exposed the scheme and some of its leaders. In pre-emptive strike Generalitat services detained a few of the conspirators; the others fled to France. Estat Català was sidelined, while CNT-FAI ensured its dominant position in Catalonia. The attempted coup remains a poorly researched and rather unknown episode.

== Background ==
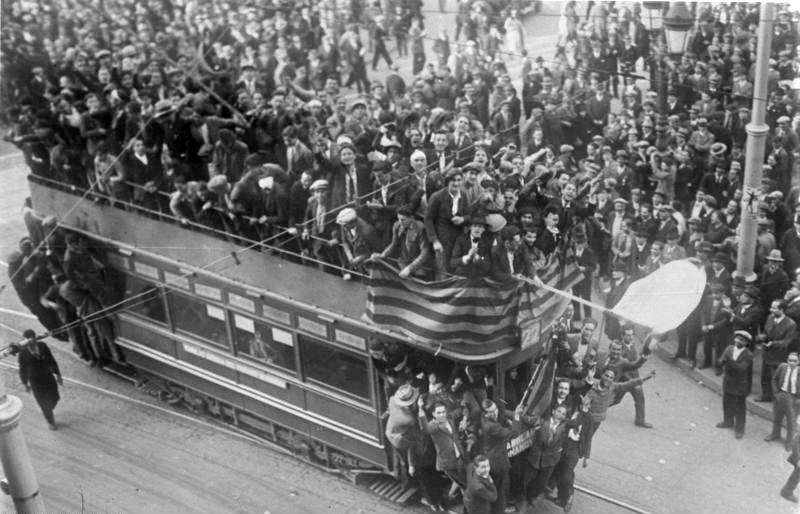
Republic declared, Barcelona 1931

Since the late 19th century along traditional political groupings – Conservatives, Liberals, Carlists, Republicans – there were new currents emerging in Catalonia: Socialists, Communists, Anarchists and Catalan nationalists. The last two of these were getting increasingly popular. Their social basis partially overlapped, though the Anarchists catered mostly to urban proletariat, while the Catalanists tended to gain dynamics among the mid-lower strata. While competing in terms of popular mobilization, they nevertheless pursued the same anti-system and left-wing course. Following the fall of the monarchy in 1931 various currents of Catalanism converged in the Republican Left of Catalonia (Esquerra Republicana de Catalunya, ERC), the centre-left nationalist and federative party structure under the leadership of the left-wing independentist Francesc Macià, which dominated the autonomous Catalan parliament. The Anarchists, who by default boycotted any electoral action, focused rather on expansion of their nationwide trade union, Confederación Nacional de Trabajo (CNT). Their structures actively engaged against the state and in late 1933 managed to mount insurgent action in some parts of Catalonia. (Note: discussion of the Anarchists and their position versus other left-wing groupings in)

In October 1934 parts of Northern Spain were engulfed by revolutionary turmoil; the Generalitat de Catalunya took part of the revolution and declared a "Catalan State of the Spanish Federal Republic". The Anarchists did nothing to support their cause; instead, laboured to introduce their own anarcho-syndicalist communes. The ERC-controlled autonomous government of the Generalitat cracked down on anarchist structures; following outbursts of violence mutual aversion between the two was already bordering hostility. During the general elections of February 1936 the Anarchists hesitantly decided not to oppose the Popular Front alliance, which included ERC, but soon truce gave way to tension. In April the Anarchist hit-squad murdered Miquel Badia, who in 1934 engineered and executed the repressive anti-CNT campaign. The Catalanists themselves got increasingly divided over policy towards the central government and the radical Left. Many lambasted Generalitat for appeasement and demanded a more decisive stand. In May 1936 Estat Català (EC), a group which so far formed part of ERC, left the federation.

== Estat Català ==
Estat Català was a Catalan nationalist organization which emerged in the early 1920s, distinct from other Catalanist groupings due to its extreme anti-establishment position and left-wing social outlook. Since the early 1930s EC was getting increasingly radical and adopted a militant stand; its uniformed paramilitary militia, the Escamots, were outlawed following a series of violent episodes. In the mid-1930s EC founded ERC alongside other Republican parties and formed its radical, left wing. Having left Esquerra in May 1936 the party regained its fully independent status and became the key vehicle of revolutionary Catalan nationalism. It was soon merged with two other, smaller and equally radical parties of Catalanist left: Nosaltres Sols! and Partit Nacionalista Català. The command layer of the united organization was formed by the EC leader Josep Dencas, the former NS! chief, an ideologue Manuel Blasi, and the former president of PNC Josep Maria Xammar. The integration process was still ongoing when in July 1936 Spain was rocked by the military coup d'etat. (Note: in the early summer of 1936 Estat Català numbered some 6,000 members)

Many EC members actively resisted the military rebels; during the fightings they seized large quantities of arms. In the already revolutionary ambience the party moved to new headquarters in the Oro de Rhin restaurant by the Gran Via, launched a new daily bulletin, the Diari de Barcelona and commenced massive recruitment to its militia ranks. (Note: some of the already formed EC militia units were dispatched to fight the Nationalists, either on the Aragon front or taking part in invasion of the Balearic Islands) Representatives of EC joined numerous inter-party bodies competing for power, especially Comitè de Milícies Antifeixistes; however, the party did not enter the coalition Generalitat government. Relations with the Anarchists, who in aftermath of the failed military coup emerged as the dominant political grouping in Catalonia, remained tense. In August the CNT commando tried to plunder the main EC office and their representatives in the government demanded that Dencàs, along the murdered Badia blamed for anti-Anarchist violence of 1934, be detained. By September he fled the country, fearing for his life. (Note: when it turned out that when on exile, Dencàs fled to Italy (where he was arrested by Italian fascist police and shortly after went to France). EC expulsed him from the party ranks) The party leadership was assumed by its former secretary, Joan Torres-Picart.

== Jockeying for position ==
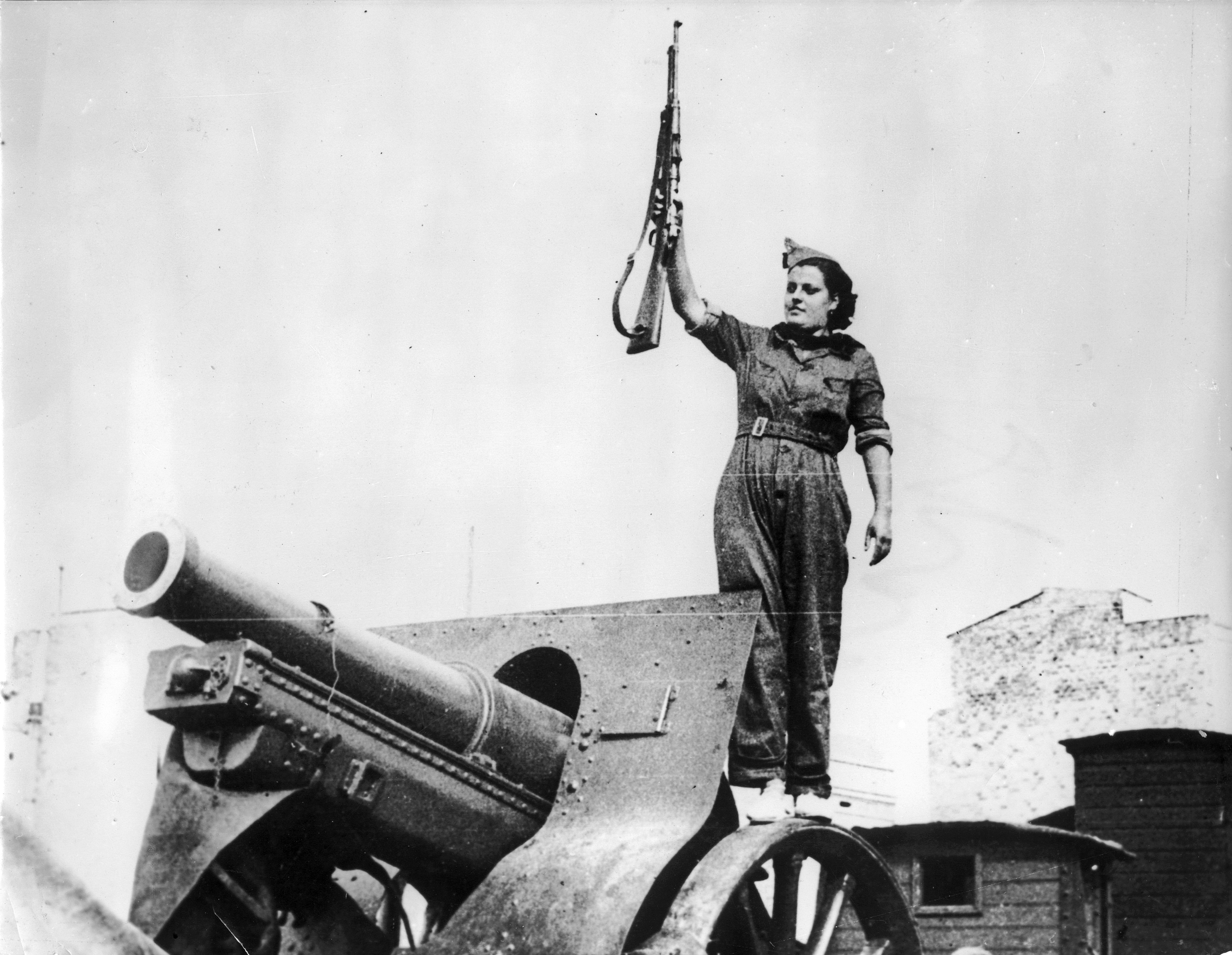
revolution in Barcelona, 1936

In the summer of 1936 the Generalitat decided to form a Catalan army, the People's Army of Catalonia. Supported by most parties – though not by the Anarchists – the government started to form first units. Estat Català remained very active in the process; its people dominated 3 battalions to be deployed along the French border and known as Milícies Pirinenques (MP). Their officer corps was very much composed of militants related earlier to OMNS, Organizació Militar Nosaltres Sols, a cadre military section of Nosaltres Sols!. During the fall first MP sub-units indeed started to take over control points on the Pyrenean border with France; not in few locations skirmishes with local Anarchist units, so far manning the posts, ensued. The own EC party initiative was raising a large, 700-men battalion Columna Volant Catalana; it was originally to be sent to the Aragon front, but did not enter into action; its sub-units were stationed across various locations of the Lleida province. Other party militia units were being reorganized by the former Escamots commander, Joan Cornudella.

Since the late summer of 1936 the EC party press was getting increasingly explicit about the need to "Catalanize" the ongoing revolution; decreasingly enigmatic articles suggested that the process was about getting Catalan independence declared and about having all non-aligned political groupings, principally the Anarchists, marginalized. Xammar talked to president Companys about breaking the Anarchist domination in the region. He also demanded that EC people get nominated to high positions in the Generalitat security; Companys did not seem interested. The second-in-command person in the autonomous Catalan structures, the prime minister and the parliament speaker Joan Casanovas, was more tractable; the EC member in the 1920s, later he remained in the ERC mainstream. He started to voice publicly about the need to reinforce the state and assume responsibility for bold action, which was broadly taken for a hardly veiled criticism of vacillating Generalitat policy. (Note: a historian claims that while Companys intended to play the Anarchists versus the Communists, Casanovas opted for a less subtle forceful solution) These declarations triggered open conflict between Companys and Casanovas; in September the latter was dismissed from premiership. His seat was taken by a close Companys associate, Josep Tarradellas.

== Gear-up to action ==
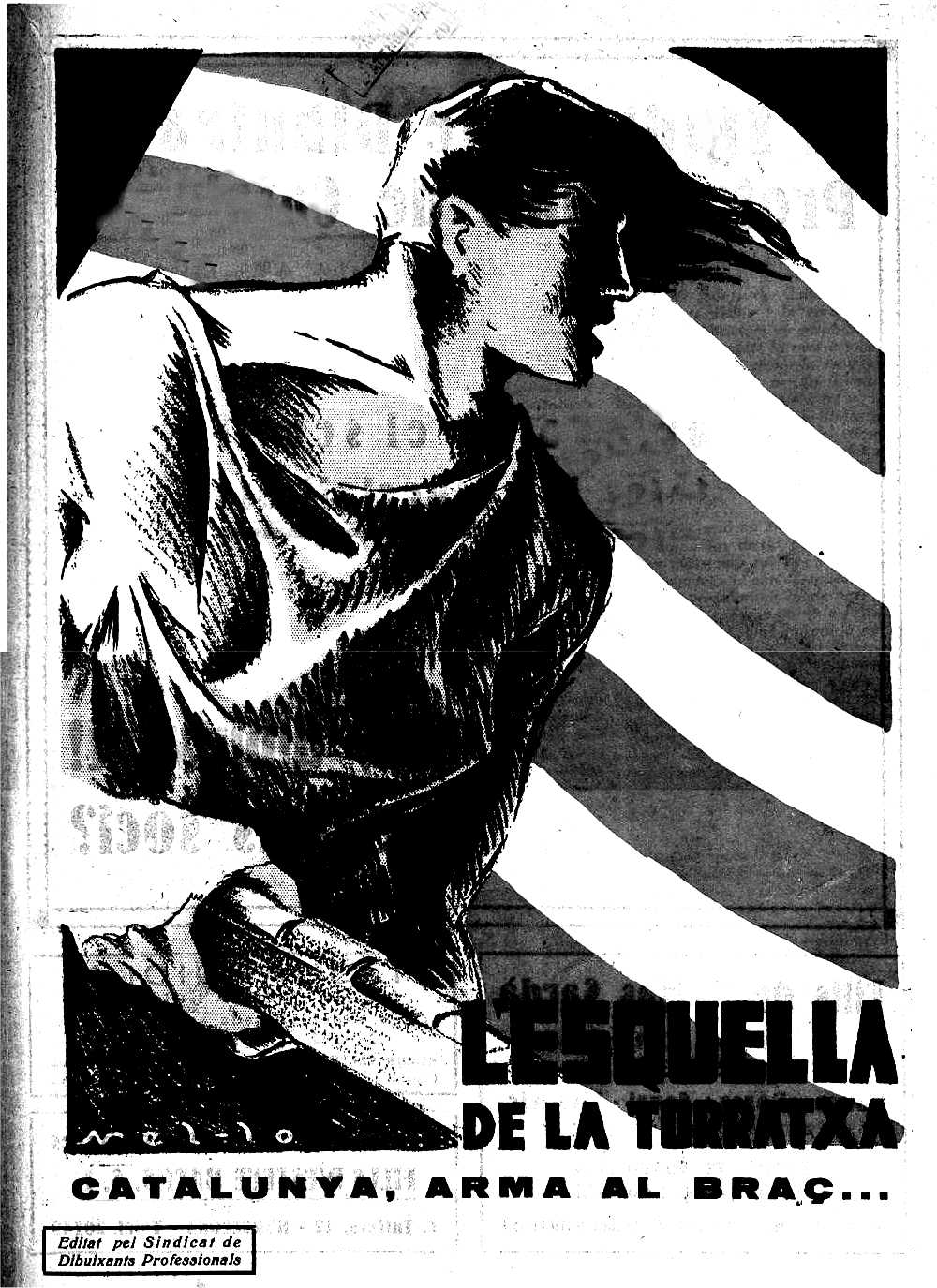
Catalan nationalist-revolutionary propaganda

Historians assume that since early October 1936 the EC leaders started to discuss a violent takeover of power in autonomous Catalonia, possibly by means of a coup d'etat. Their key asset were armed units controlled by the party, including the militia, the forces of Columna Volant and the MP battalions; some were supposed to enter into action in Barcelona, and some were expected to seize power in other cities and towns of the region. The conspiracy network was being developed within local administrative or revolutionary institutions. Xammar negotiated with acquiescent officials in various committees in Northern Catalonia about a would-be joint action against the Anarchists. The conspirators assumed that the Generalitat security would at least remain passive; since early October the Commissar of Public Order, the de facto police chief in Catalonia, was a former EC militant Andreu Revertés. Thought the Anarchists protested his nomination, it was enforced by Companys, the decision related to some private links between the two. (Note: Companys' second wife, Carmen Ballester, was good friend to Revertés' partner. Herself she was once the wife of EC militant Carles Duran, and since 1933 the lover of another EC activist, Miquel Badia) (Note: Some historians claim that in the Republic days Revertes was routinely procuring women for top Estat Catala politicians)

The EC envoys Josep Maria Batista i Roca and Nicolau Rubió i Serralach sounded the French and British diplomats in Spain about would-be recognition of independent Catalonia; outcome of these conversations is not clear. Most likely the same issue was discussed with Mussolini envoys. (Note: Details are not known. EC men, and especially Josep Dencas, were talking to Mussolini or his representatives on recognition of independent Catalonia already during the Republic era) Another Estat Català delegate Vicenç Borrell travelled to Brussels to speak to Francesc Cambó, the historic leader of right-wing Catalanists. However, Cambó did not seem interested; at the time he was anticipating a swift triumph of the Nationalists. Since early November EC scaled up their radical, independentist propaganda campaign. During numerous rallies Borrell, Cornudella, Xammar, and Torres-Picart vehemently criticised irresolute Generalitat policy. To much surprise, one of their meetings hosted Casanovas; in belligerent tone he declared that the time for bold action was near and spoke with contempt about the Catalan parliament, the body he still presided. Casanovas received numerous adhesion messages, including many from various EC militia units.

== Climax ==
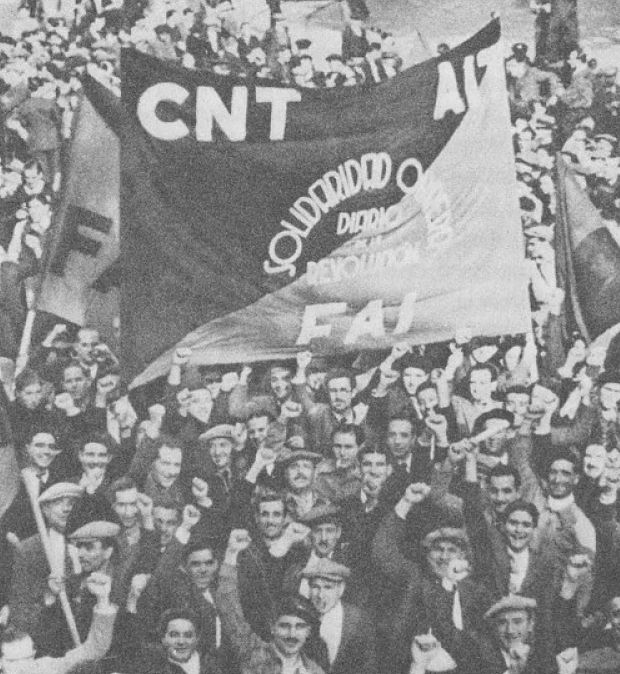
anarchist rally, Barcelona

In early November the Nationalist troops were advancing at the outskirts of Madrid and it might have appeared that the fall of the Republic was imminent. In mid-November CV and MP units stationed in various locations in Catalonia were put on alert. Though a strong EC militia formation, known as Columna Germans Badia, was sent to the Madrid front, a so-called 2. Batalión Milícies Pirinenques got gathered in the Barcelona barracks. A transport of arms and munitions entered the country from France; it was organized by Revertés, who ensured that the Generalitat money is used to finance the delivery, though none of high government officials was aware of it. The train was directed at a depot station on the Barcelona suburbs; distribution of hundreds of rifles and grenades among specific EC-controlled units was discussed at a meeting of 22 November, attended by Revertés, Casanovas, Torres-Picart, Xammar and Cornudella. (Note: It is not clear who was the moving spirit behind the scheme. Some scholars point to Xammar, "home fort" of EC) Detachments commanded by EC men were to seize the Generalitat buildings and detain all government members; in case of resistance, they were to be shot. Companys – also to be shot if intransigent – was to be replaced as president by Casanovas. Some scholars suspect that Revertés planned to seize the transport of Bank of Spain gold, on transit from Cartagena to France, but the theory is rejected by other historians.

On 24 November the Generalitat services detained Revertés; one theory is that the action was an own initiative of his inferior, chief of Serveis d'Ordre Públic Dionisio Eroles, another one is that Eroles obtained authorization of Tarradellas or other high government officials beforehand. Eroles, himself a CNT member in structures of the security department, developed his own network of Anarchist informers. He apparently monitored Revertés' activity and decided to act once he realized the coup was near. (Note: another theory is that Revertés used security forces to settle his private business and this is how he got uncovered) Revertés, immediately dismissed from his job, was for a few hours interrogated by Eroles, his secretary Joan Solans and secretary of the Internal Security Council Aurelio Fernández. Initially they suggested he commits suicide; Revertés apparently refused. It seems that eventually there was sort of a deal closed; Revertés agreed to denounce his accomplices, while in return he was to be allowed to leave Spain. The Interior Minister Artemi Aiguader directed a wave of arrests which ensued. Torres-Picart ended up behind bars; as Casanovas enjoyed the parliamentary immunity, he found himself under police surveillance.

== Aftermath ==
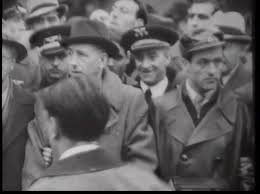
Companys and the Anarchist leader Garcia Oliver

Generalitat administration did not decide to mount a massive repressive action; only some 100 people were arrested. Some Anarchist groups intended to set up a makeshift tribunal and bring before it those charged with crime against state, but in unclear circumstances the plan was abandoned; the CNT militia ransacked Diari de Barcelona offices and the EC headquarters. Official press very vaguely informed about dismissal of Revertés, and Aiguader's public comments remained enigmatic to the extreme. The Catalan Anarchist press launched a massive onslaught against Estat Català. (Note: It was directed by the national Anarchist mouthpiece, the Barcelona-based Solidaridad Obrera) EC has not been outlawed; while Torres-Picart remained in custody, Cornudella declared himself the party leader; it soon condemned and expulsed all members deemed involved. The role of Cornudella is not clear; some scholars suspect he might have acted in accord with Eroles. The EC-controlled militia, paramilitary and army units were dispatched to the front, where they later fought valiantly and loyally.

Revertés spent the next few days jailed in the Montjuïc prison, and was later murdered in highly unclear circumstances. According to one theory he was shot in Barcelona shortly after he had left prison, according to another members of the personal Companys guard shot him on 30 November in Calaf, already on his way to Andorra. (Note: One more version is that he was executed following a kangaroo trial, which condemned Revertés to death for alleged financial misdemeanor) Casanovas as a high state official was quietly allowed to leave the country, while investigation launched by the Court of Appeal of Catalonia was eventually closed with no charges advanced. Torres-Picart in picturesque and also unclear circumstances managed to leave prison and made it to France; from there he launched a vehement campaign against Companys. Xammar with his family crossed the Spanish-French frontier before any action was taken against him; France was also the target of few high Generalitat officials, like Josep Maria Espanya. Manuel Blasi, at the time commanding an EC militia unit in Aragon, was detained by the Anarchists there; following a few weeks he was released and by the end of 1936 he also left Spain.

== Epilogue ==
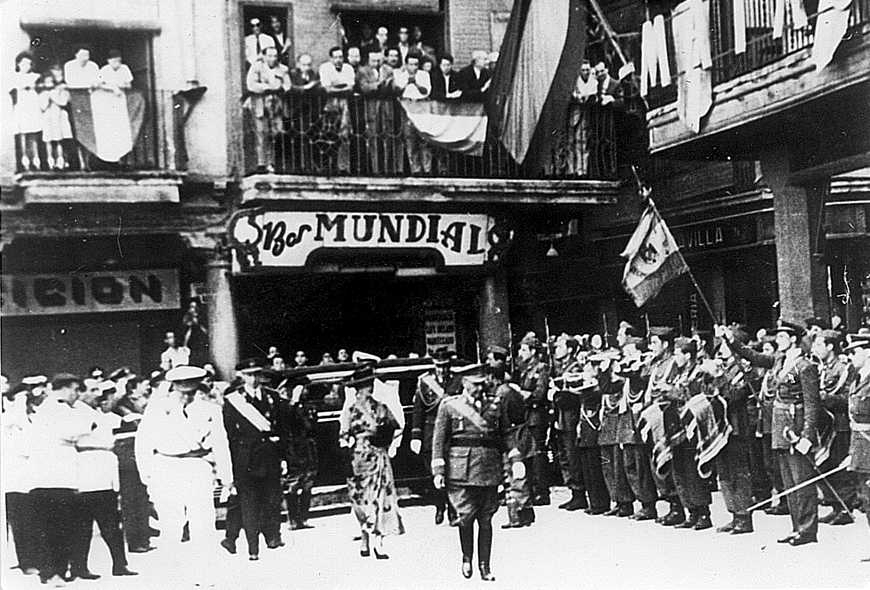
Francoism in Catalonia

Casanovas returned to Catalonia after May 1937, when the Anarchist domination in Catalonia had been broken, and – still as the parliament speaker – tried to arrange a separatist Catalan declaration of neutrality; he died in 1942 in France. Espanya, Xammar and Torres-Picart left France for Latin America, where they lived until the end of their days; Espanya died in 1953, Xammar in 1967, and Torres-Picart in 1988; before death he managed to visit the already democratic Spain. Cornudella and Blasi after 1939 returned to Spain and engaged in anti-Francoist conspiracy, both repressed; the former was elected to the Catalan parliament after 1975 and died in 1985, it is not clear when the latter died. Remnants of émigré Estat Catalá structures languished for decades until the party was registered in Spain in 1977; now it is a rather marginal grouping, even though the Catalan independence movement is at its heyday.

Following the fall of Barcelona and later the fall of Catalonia Companys left to France; handed over to the Francoists in 1940, he was executed the same year. Tarradellas lived in France and America and was a longtime president of the Generalitat of the exiled Catalan government; having returned to Spain in 1977 he was one of the best-known Catalan politicians until his death in 1988. Eroles, Aiguader and Fernández were dismissed from Generalitat security structures following the 1937 Barcelona May Days. In 1939 Eroles left to France and in unclear circumstances, possibly murdered, perished in 1940. The other two left France for Mexico; Aiguader died there in 1946, Fernández died in 1971. The fate of Solans is unknown. The Catalan anarchism deteriorated during Francoism and after 1975 was reborn as a minoritarian political force; today CNT is a small syndicalist organization. Of all protagonists of the November 1936 events, only Companys and Tarradellas are currently remembered and honored in the Catalan public space.

== Propaganda and historiography ==
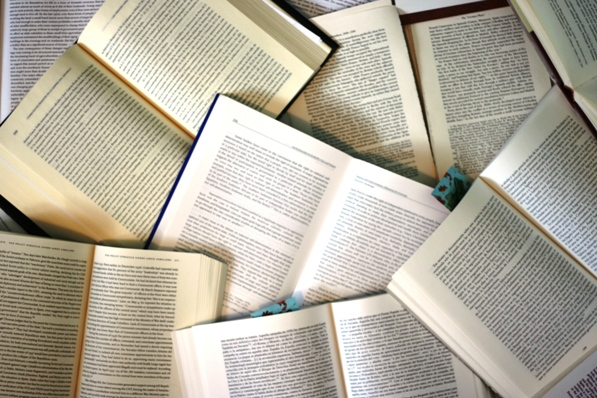

As except the Anarchists none of the parties involved banked on the November 1936 episode propaganda-wise, it soon went into oblivion; in public memory it was almost totally eclipsed by the May 1937 struggle for power in the Republican Barcelona. Also after the war the EC conspiracy was largely ignored by all parties. From the Francoist perspective it was somewhat inconvenient as incompatible with vision of a homogenous, criminal red horde. None one of the post-Republican émigré groupings saw sufficient propaganda potential of the episode. For historians it remained a rather difficult chapter of Spanish past. The Generalitat archives documented the repressive action rather than the plot itself; most EC papers have gone missing, while memoirs and other accounts provided by the protagonists were trapped in conflicting versions, inconsistencies, and political bias.

First serious attempts to target the issue come from the 1980s; historiography for decades to come did not pay much attention, referred the question in passing (Note: see e.g. very superficial – though not erroneous - remarks in classical work on the Spanish Civil War by Hugh Thomas, who adhered to the „Reverter”, spelling, repeated also by Payne and Romero Salgado) and at times suggested erroneous interpretations. A multi-angle joint analysis of the issue was published in 2012, but many of the authors remain extremely cautious, adhere to hypothetical narrative and suggest that their conclusions should be approached as preliminary. Most scholars participating agree that there was a nationalist conspiracy unfolding, though it is not clear whether it was a few EC politicians or rather the party structures engaged. It is neither known how much the plans of the coup were advanced and whether the decision to rise was in fact taken. (Note: some historians do not dwell upon a plot or a coup d'etat, but focus rather on separatist negotiations about neutrality of Catalonia; counter-action of CNT is hence presented as an attempt to compromise EC) Historians are not sure whether counter-action was triggered by CNT, Generalitat or other political groups. Many detailed questions remain unanswered, e.g. the one about the role of Casanovas. The Catalan coup of 1936 is discussed against the background of some broader issues, like this of the Catalan fascism.

== Bibliography ==
- Gascón Ricao, Antonio (2012). "El complot de Estat Català contra Companys". In Enric Ucelay-Da Cal; Arnau González i Vilalta (eds.). Contra Companys, 1936. La frustración nacionalista ante la revolución, Valencia. Universitat de València. ISBN 9788437089157.
- Díaz Esculies, Daniel (2012). "Estat Català contra Companys". In Enric Ucelay-Da Cal; Arnau González i Vilalta (eds.). Contra Companys, 1936. La frustración nacionalista ante la revolución, Valencia. Universitat de València. ISBN 9788437089157.
- Payne, Stanley G. (1970). The Spanish Revolution. Norton. ISBN 9780393098853. OCLC 132223.
