= Bandera Negra =

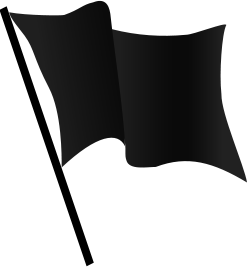
- Dates active: 1925–1926
- Ideology: Catalan independence movement Catalan nationalism

Bandera Negra (Black Flag) or Santa Germandat Catalana (Holy Catalan Brotherhood) was a secret, armed sub-organization of the Estat Català political party, founded on May 3, 1925.

Its name referred to the black flag raised by the defenders of Barcelona in the Catalan Campaign (1713–1714) on August 1, 1714, signaling to the Bourbon troops that they would fight to the death and never surrender. On September 12, however, they did surrender, ending the cause of the Archduke of Austria. Regardless, historian Enric Ucelay-Da Cal still calls the flag "the traditional symbol associated with the will to kill or die".

== History ==
Historian Enric Ucelay-Da Cal explains the formation of Bandera Negra:

In Bertrellans Street, a dark alley parallel to the commercial street (then in full development and construction) of Portal de l'Àngel, there was a flat with a small excursion group called the Serra del Cadí. They were few, but many of them would have outstanding performances in the following years. They decided on what would later be called the armed route. With that intention, they took on a clandestine identity and defined themselves as a "secret Catalan brotherhood" with the sonorous and threatening name of Black Flag... They established contact with Manuel Pagès, Cardona's deputy and organizer of new squads or escamots...

The organization had approximately twelve leaders and some sympathizers. The most notable head of the organization was Marcel·lí Perelló, together with Jaume Compte (also a member of the Autonomous Center of Trade and Industry Dependents). Notable members include: Miquel Badia, Daniel Cardona (head abroad), Ramon Xammar, Emili Granier Barrera, Jaume Julià, Joan Bertran and Jaume Balius. It also had committees in Béziers (France) and in Buenos Aires.

Bandera Negra carried out an attack against King Alfonso XIII on the Garraf coast (Garraf plot) along with other armed actions of some success, such as the bomb attack against the house of the Baron of Maldá.
