= Catalan Identitarian Movement =

Far-right Catalan nationalist movement

The Catalan Identitarian Movement (Catalan: Moviment Identitari Català) is a Catalan nationalist and far right political movement in the Spanish autonomous community of Catalonia. It is an ethnic nationalist movement, supporting Catalan independence, opposed to immigration from outside of Europe, and in favor of controlling immigration within Europe. It is inspired by Estat Català and Nosaltres Sols!, the armed factions of Catalan separatism in the 1930s, as well as by the identitarian views of early Catalan nationalists.

In September 2018, the MIC as well as the far-right pro-independence political party SOM Catalans, attended the annual floral offering to Rafael Casanova, chanting slogans against Spain and Islam.

Three of its members were the only arrests made by the Catalan regional police during a counter-demonstration to a Jusapol (a Spanish police labor union) demonstration in October 2018. The members of Jusapol were demonstrating in support of Spanish police officers that had tried to suppress the 2017 Catalan independence referendum a year before.
