= Nosaltres Sols! =

Catalan nationalist paramilitary political movement

Ourselves Alone/Only!
- Nosaltres Sols!
- Formation: 1931
- Dissolved: 1939
- Type: Paramilitary organization
- Purpose: Catalan nationalism
- Headquarters: Sant Just Desvern, Spain; Perpignan, France

Nosaltres Sols! (English: Ourselves alone/only!) was a Catalan nationalist paramilitary political movement from the 20th century. It was born in 1931, in a rented space property of the political party Unió Catalanista (Catalan Unity) and created a weekly journal with the exact same name as well . The purpose of the organization was to confront those who were considered enemies of Catalonia, mainly Spanish unionists, but also anarchists, communists and fascists.

Its founder and main leader was Daniel Cardona i Civit known as Vibrant and L'irlandès (the Irishman) and elected Mayor of his hometown Sant Just Desvern. Nosaltres Sols! can be understood as a continuation or political realisation of Bandera Negra i Santa Germandat Catalana (Black Flag and Holly Catalan Brotherhood) founded in 1925, an armed branch of the independentist political party Estat Català whose members carried out a terrorist bomb attack against king Alfonso XIII of Spain and dictator Primo de Rivera in the town of Garraf and among other action, another bomb attack against the earl of Maldá, a unionist noble in favour of the Spanish monarchy.

Its name comes from the translation into Catalan of the main slogan of the Irish republican party Sinn Féin Sinn Féin Amháin ("ourselves only"), which was to influence the ideology of Daniel Cardona i Civit and the organisation as a whole. Even though Cardona, because of his many travels to Ireland was only inspired by the Irish Fight for independence, as he himself wrote in many occasions, it has been pointed out by the Spanish historian Xosé Manoel Núñez Seixas, that a member of the organization, representing its germanophile side, Manel Blasi, contacted German National Socialists, who ensured that the Catalan northern 'race' 'was more aryan than the 'africanized' Spanish 'race' . Also another member, Baldomer Palazon, representing its Italophile side made contact with Italian fascists. Truth is that in the end, Nosaltres Sols! fought against both German and Italian forces who physically supported the Nationalist forces during the Spanish Civil War.

Many militants came from Estat Català who criticized the decision of Francesc Macià of giving birth to a new political party called Esquerra Republicana de Catalunya (Republican Left of Catalonia), other militants came from Palestra, a Catalan youth nationalist hiking organization influenced by the Czech Sokol, the Irish Fianna Éirann, and Robert Baden-Powell scouting.

Nosaltres Sols! was transformed into l'Organització Militar Nosaltres Sols!' or OMNS (the Militar organization Nosaltres Sols!) when the statue of autonomy of Núria was proclaimed during the second Spanish Republic since they considered it to be very soft and useless regarding sovereignty.

Nosaltres Sols! Instigated and actively participated in the Events of 6 October, a separatist attempt to raise in arms, instigated by the government of Catalonia and its President Lluís Companys in order to secede from Spain, for which Daniel Cardona i Civit was to be condemned to death by firing squad and therefore exiled. In Perpignan, Cardona made contact with members of the Basque independentist forces, and the Basque Nationalist Party.

In June 1936, after the coup d'état, Nosaltres Sols! maintained its loyalty to Republican Catalonia and therefore fought alongside the republican army, inside the Estat Català branch and the Generalitat forces with certain autonomy. And after the Spanish Civil War was over, most of the militants, still very young founded the Front Nacional de Catalunya (National Front of Catalonia) and the Organització de Resistència nacional (organization of the national resistance), which fought the Wehrmacht in France and afterwards kept on fighting against Francoist Spain, mainly through Guerrilla warfare in the Pyrenees alongside other partisans.
