= Catalan Nationalist Party =

Catalan Nationalist Party Partit Nacionalista Català
- Abbreviation: PNC
- Founded: March 1932
- Dissolved: 1936 (Note: Integration of the majority of the party in Estat Català.); 1940 (Note: Integration of the minority in the National Front of Catalonia)
- Merger of: Palestra; Elements d’Estat Català; Dissidents from Nosaltres Sols!
- Merged into: Estat Català; National Front of Catalonia
- Ideology: Catalan nationalism Catalan independence
- Political position: Centre-right
- Colors: Orange

The Catalan Nationalist Party (in Catalan: Partit Nacionalista Català) was a Catalan independentist political party in Catalonia created in March 1932.

== History ==
The PNC arose mainly from the process of convergence of Palestra, the so-called "Elements d’Estat Català" (the militants from Estat Català that were critical of the decision to create the Republican Left of Catalonia), dissidents from Nosaltres Sols! and independents (like Manuel Massó i Llorens).

The PNC participated in the first elections to the Parliament of Catalonia, on 20 November 1932, with a candidacy in Barcelona, headed by the jurist Francesc de Paula Maspons i Anglasell.

Despite obtaining more than 6,000 votes, the lack of representation in the Catalan parliament conditioned its subsequent political development. Following a strong internal discussions, that lead to the abandonment of the formation of some of its founders, and the "freezing" of its internal statutes for a year under the direction of Joan B. Muntada i Macau and of Antoni Mur i Ubiergo, after 1934 the PNC participated with other independentist groups in the preparation of the events of October 6th. In the municipal elections of January 1934 the party presented lists in the cities Barcelona and Tarragona, obtaining poor results. Finally, in June 1936, along with Nosaltres Sols!, the PNC dissolved itself to become part of the historical party Estat Català, which had just broke with the Republican Left of Catalonia a few weeks before. Some leaders, and a minority of members, rejected the merge and maintained the party alive until 1940, when the majority of them joined the National Front of Catalonia (FNC).
