= Diario de Barcelona =

Defunct Catalan newspaper

The Diario de Barcelona (Catalán: Diari de Barcelona) (The Barcelona Journal) was a newspaper founded in 1792 in Barcelona, Catalonia, Spain. With a few interruptions it was published in paper form until 1994, and in digital form until 2009, making it one of the oldest newspapers in Europe. It has been called the most important newspaper in Barcelona's history, or the first real chronicle of Barcelona.

== History ==
Permission to publish a journal was granted to Pedro Husson de Lapazaran, a Neapolitan printer. It was written in Spanish and acted as an official journal, publishing official notices. Around the turn of the 18th century readers began to demand content in Catalan and during the period of Napoleonic rule it was temporarily published with parallel French and Catalan text.

After the War of Independence, on 6 June 1814, the right to publish passed to Antoni Brusi i Mirabent, and subsequently to his descendants, as a result of which it was popularly called El Brusi. The journal's politics were monarchist and liberal-conservative; this policy meant that it survived in the short term, but began to be less influential following a reduction in press censorship. Apart from a few Catalan poems, the language was mostly Castilian, like most of the Catalan press of the time. However because most readers used Catalan the paper had to provide explanations of some terms. Many Catalan writers (for example Joan Maragall) wrote in Castilian. A reduction in the level of censorship, other newspapers such as La Vanguardia (1881) and La Veu de Catalunya (1899)) challenged the pre-eminence of the Diario de Barcelona.

During the Civil War the paper was seized and transformed into the organ of the Estat Català, produced in Catalan by Marcel·lí Perelló i Domingo. After the war it reverted to its previous owners. From 21 October it re-emerged as a worker-run bilingual edition. The paper, ceased publication in 1984, was acquired by the city of Barcelona the following year and transferred to the Grupo Zeta. From 1986 it was published entirely in Catalan.
