= Marcel·lí Perelló i Domingo =

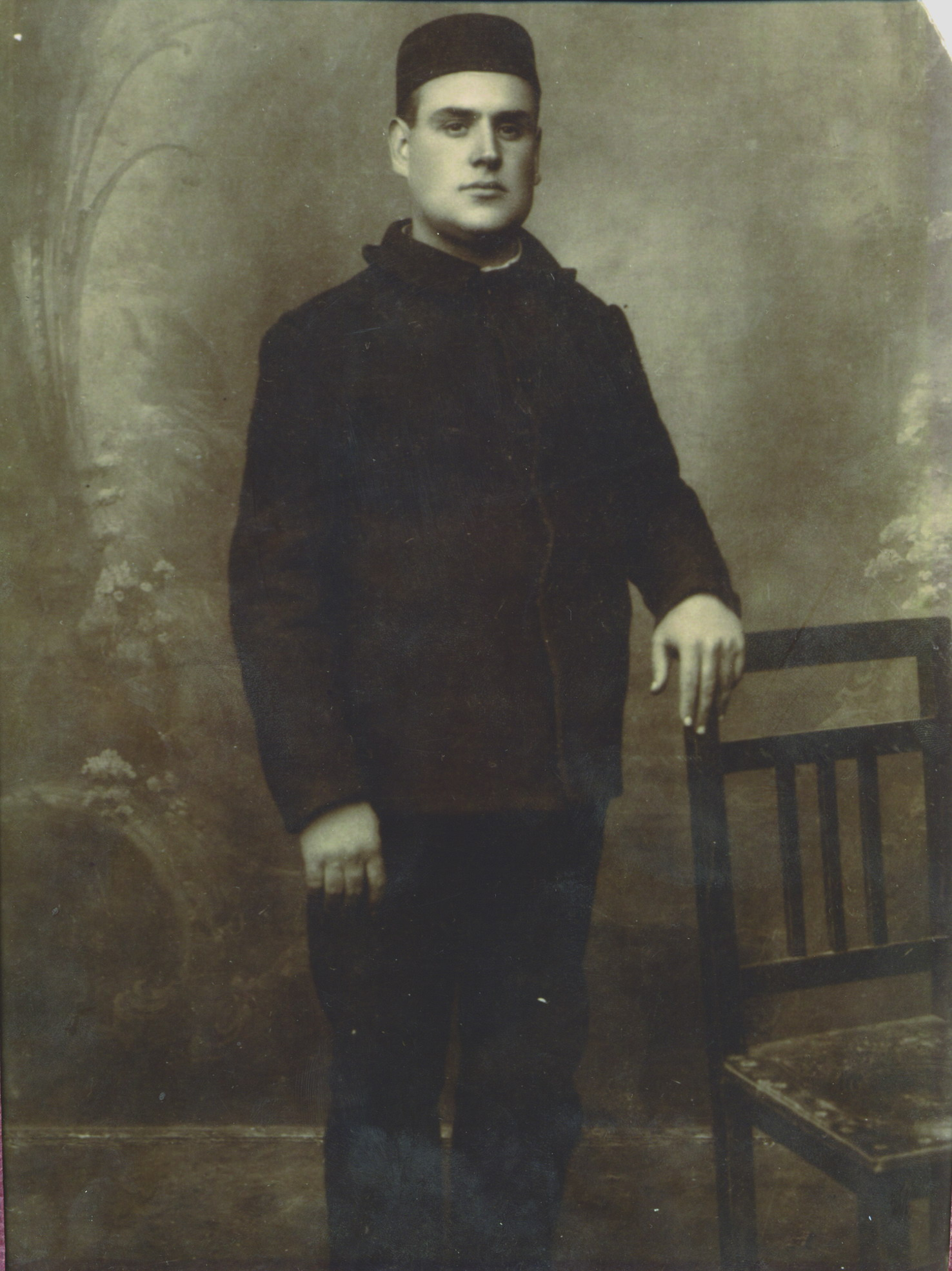
Marcel·lí Perelló, prisoner at El Dueso prison, Santoña, Cantabria, c. 1929

Marcel·lí Perelló i Domingo (Catalan pronunciation: [məɾsəlˈli pəɾəˈʎo i ðuˈmiŋɡu]) born in (Barcelona in 1897? - died Mexico City 1961) was a Catalan guerrilla politician and newspaper writer. He was the first Secretary of Estat Català. He was part of a plot against the Spanish Throne, was imprisoned and exiled to Mexico.

== The Plot of Garraf ==
He was son of Frederic Perelló i Arnús and Magdalena Domingo i Selma, he was the commander of the Catalan State squads escamots d'Estat Català and belonged to Black Flag (Bandera Negra). He directed the Plot of Garraf that, in 1925, intended to kill Alfonso XIII and all his family, placing an explosive device at Garraf railway, where the royal train would pass by. A traitor caused the plot to fail, and Perelló and his fellows were condemned to death. Later, their sentences were commuted to life because the authorities did not want them to become martyrs. When the dictatorship of Primo de Rivera fell in 1930, they were set free.

== Family ==
While in jail at the Penal de El Dueso prison, he met Edelmira Valls i Puig, who participated in a huge national and international solidarity campaign for their liberation. Once he was set free they got married and had six children: Jordina (1931–1933); Carles (1932), mathematician and Ph.D. at UAB; Edelmira (1934) Frederic (1941–1942), Marcel·lí (1944) and Mercè (1947).

== Political activity ==
Marcel·lí Perelló was the first Secretary of Estat Català; he also joined Nosaltres Sols! and Partit Català Proletari. His radical point of view turned him against Francesc Macià. During the Spanish Civil War, Perelló directed the Diari de Barcelona. In 1939 he and his family were exiled to France, and went from there to Casablanca, and then to Mexico, reaching the Mexican shore in 1942. Perelló worked recycling and selling old tools, and also participated actively in the Catalan independence movement abroad. He was an active member of Unió Catalana Independentista, very close to Catalunya Grop from Santiago de Cuba under the direction of Salvador Carbonell i Puig.
