= Walden 7 =

Apartment building in Sant Just Desvern, Spain

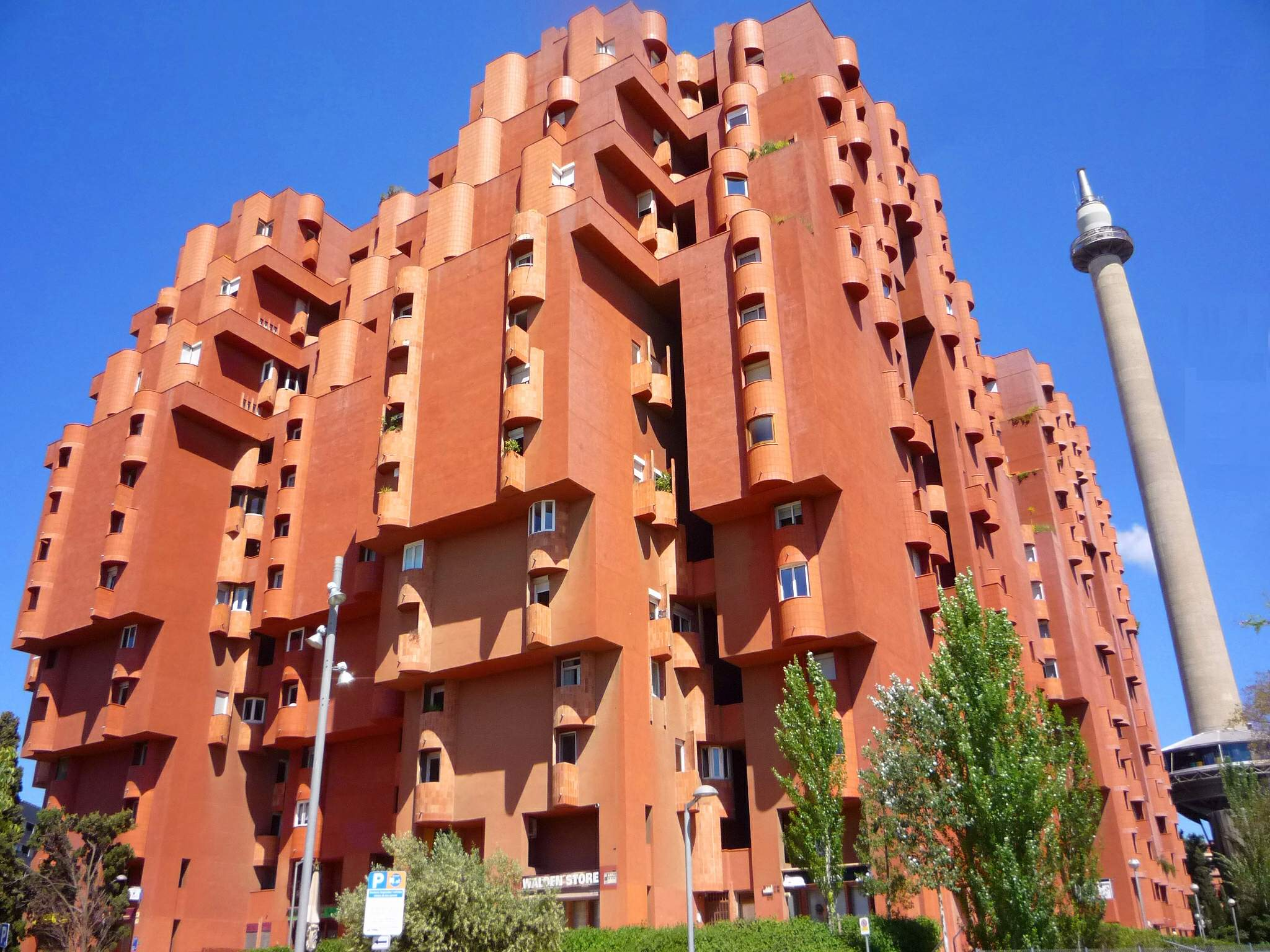
- The building in 2017

- Location within Catalonia
- Etymology: B. F. Skinner's novel Walden Two

General information
- Status: Completed
- Type: Apartment building
- Location: Carretera Reial, 106, Sant Just Desvern, Catalonia, Spain
- Coordinates: 41.38036°N 2.06778°E
- Construction started: 1972
- Opened: 1975
- Renovated: 1993–1995

Technical details
- Floor count: 16

Design and construction
- Architects: Ricardo and Anna Bofill
- Architecture firm: Ricardo Bofill Taller de Arquitectura

Website
- www.walden7.com

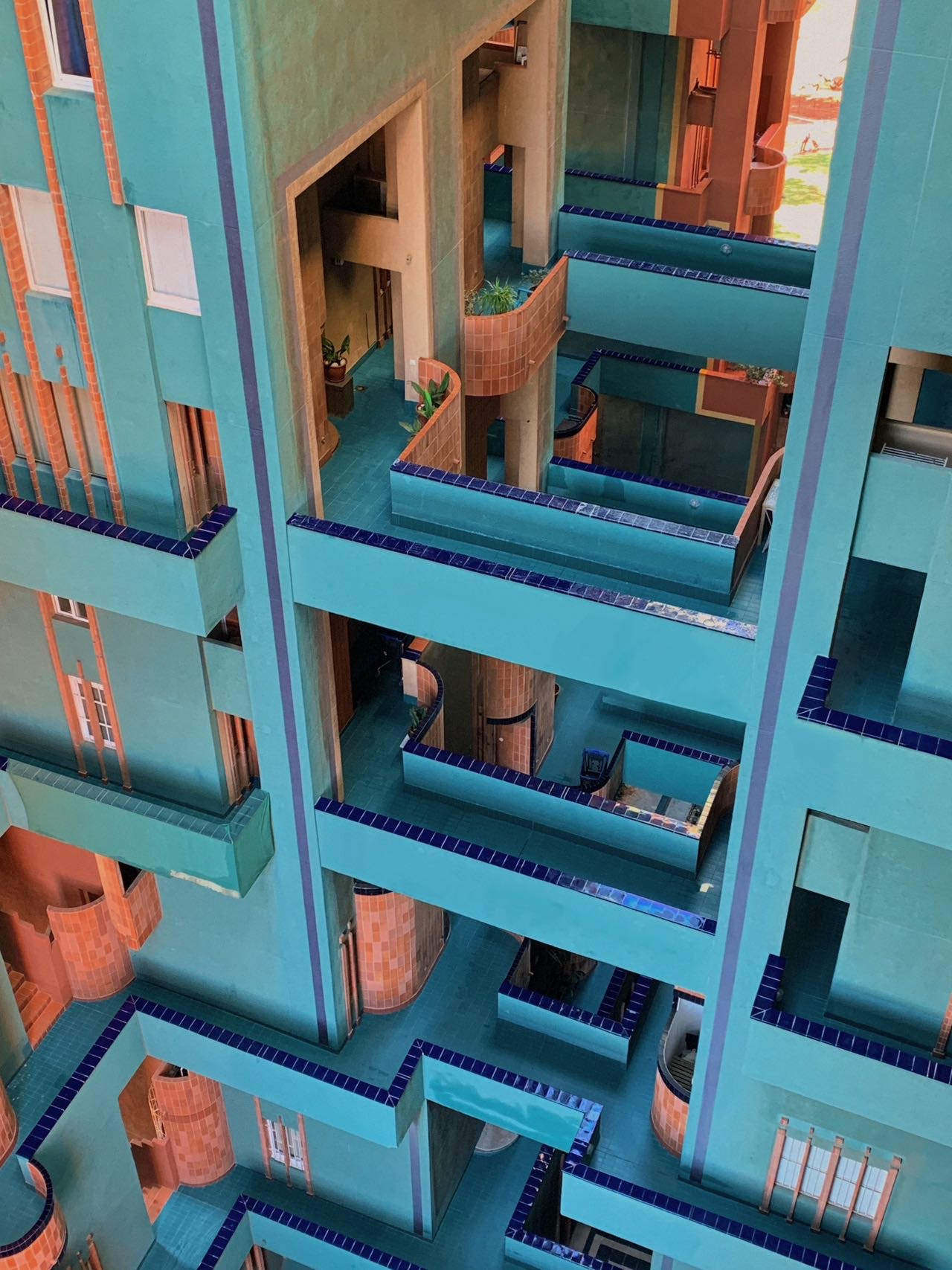
Interior balcony of the building

The Walden 7 is an apartment building designed by Ricardo Bofill Taller de Arquitectura and located in Sant Just Desvern near Barcelona, in Catalonia, Spain. Construction began in 1972, with it being inaugurated three years later. It was renovated due to damage from 1993 to 1995.

== Name ==
The name of the building is inspired by B. F. Skinner's novel, Walden Two, which depicts a utopian community and itself is a reference to Henry David Thoreau's novel Walden. It is noted for its use of modules to create apartments and many public community spaces.

== Structure and usage ==
The original project includes 446 residences. With a budget lower than the norm for subsidized housing at the time, Walden 7 was built in the area to the west of Barcelona. It was originally designed as one of five similar blocks. The building is composed of 18 towers which are displaced from their base, forming a curve and coming into contact with the neighbouring towers, described as a "vertical labyrinth with seven interconnecting interior courtyards." The area originally devoted to communal uses was reduced to allow an increased number of apartments. These apartments are formed on the basis of one or more 28-square-metre (33 sq yd) modules, which creates, on different levels, dwellings that range from single-module studios to large multiple-module apartments. Partitions between modules may be modified, designed to shift as family structures shift.

Walden 7 was designed with small, uniform windows and no central heating. Its original design included a bath in the middle of the room, which most residents removed. The original exterior façade was covered with small, red ceramic tiles backed with the wrong adhesive, creating a pedestrian hazard as the tiles fell off the building., The local government began repairing the structure in the 1990s, and a 1995 refurbishment removed most of the tiles and replaced them with red paint. The only remaining tiles exist on the small balconies. The interior is painted in blue, purple, and yellow. It is accessible by tram; the Trambaix system stop near the building is named Walden.

Although the building is a private apartment complex, it offers public tours.

== Reception ==
Walden 7 became instantly iconic and made the cover of the prestigious Architectural Design magazine in July 1975.

In an article for Architectural Digest, architectural historian Vincent Scully described Walden 7 as "a wildly expressionistic apartment house, part Gaudí, part Archigram".

== In popular culture ==
In the 1993 film The Bilingual Lover, two characters live in Walden 7. The falling tiles are mentioned.

== Gallery ==
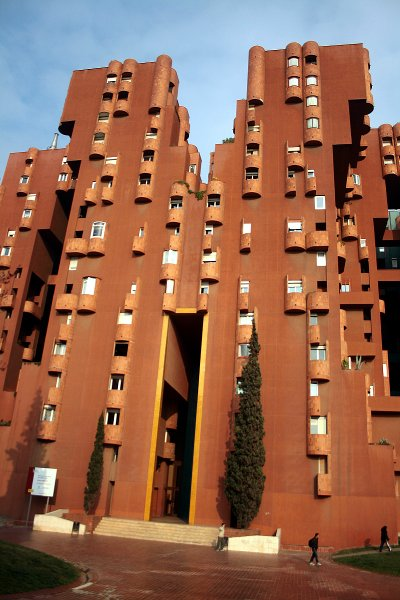
Front of building

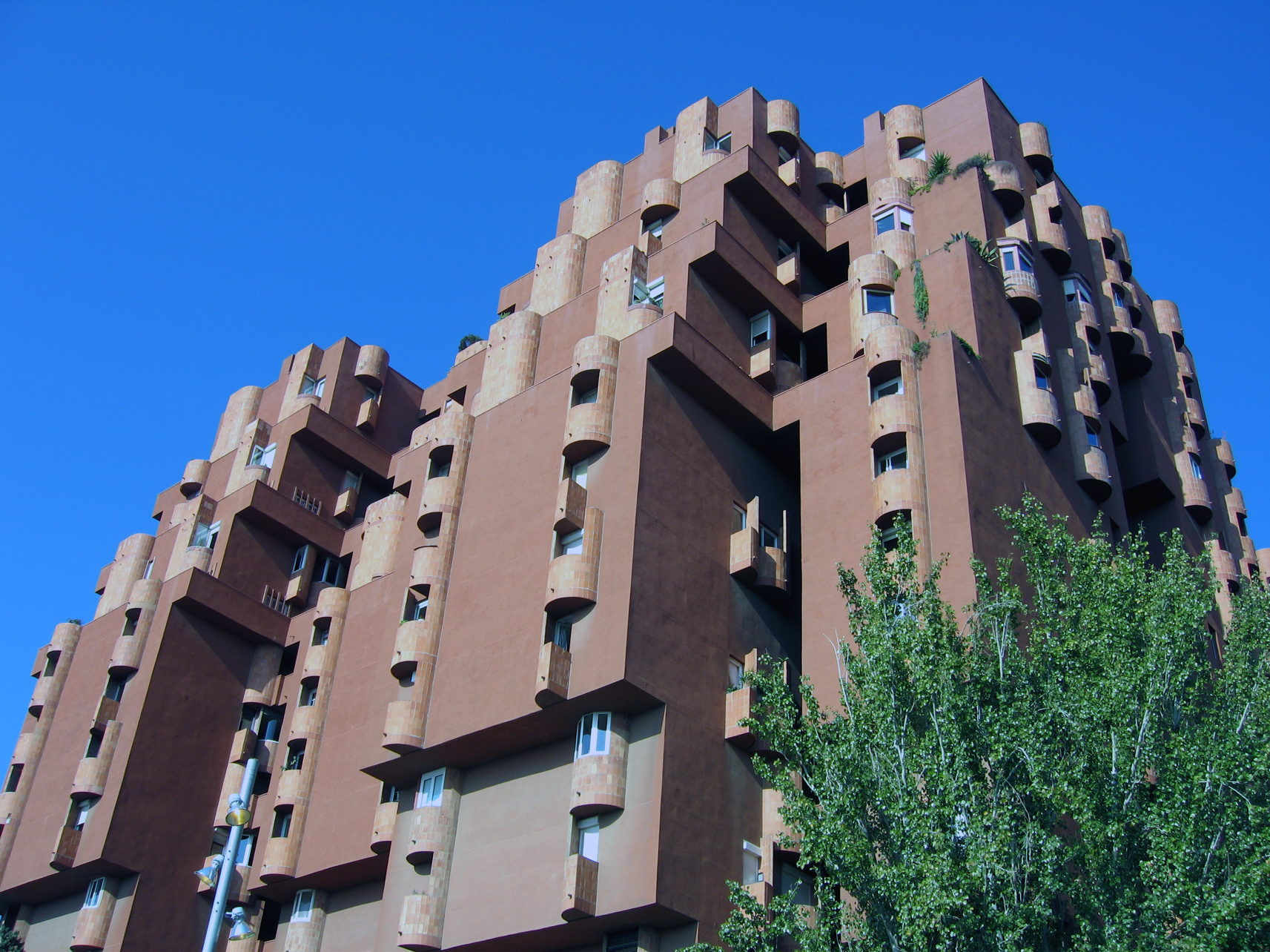
Building

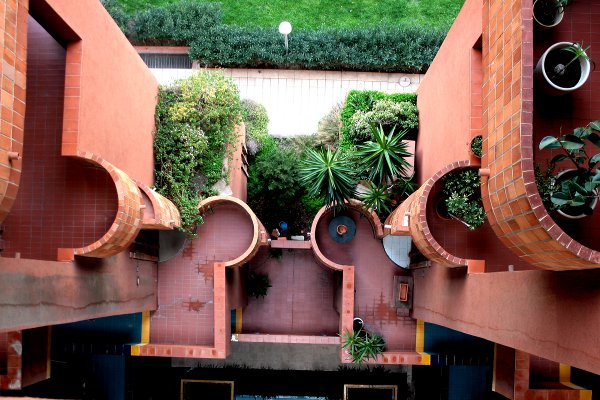
Balconies

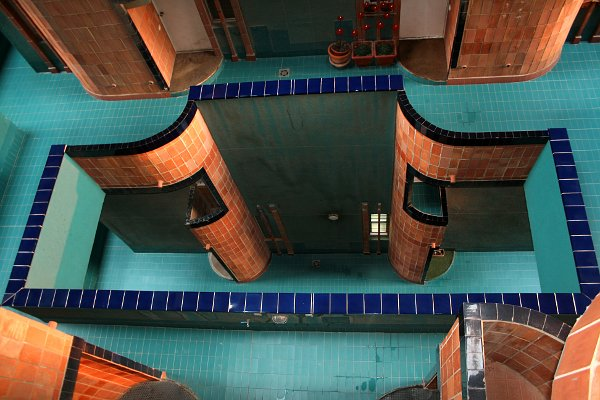
Patio
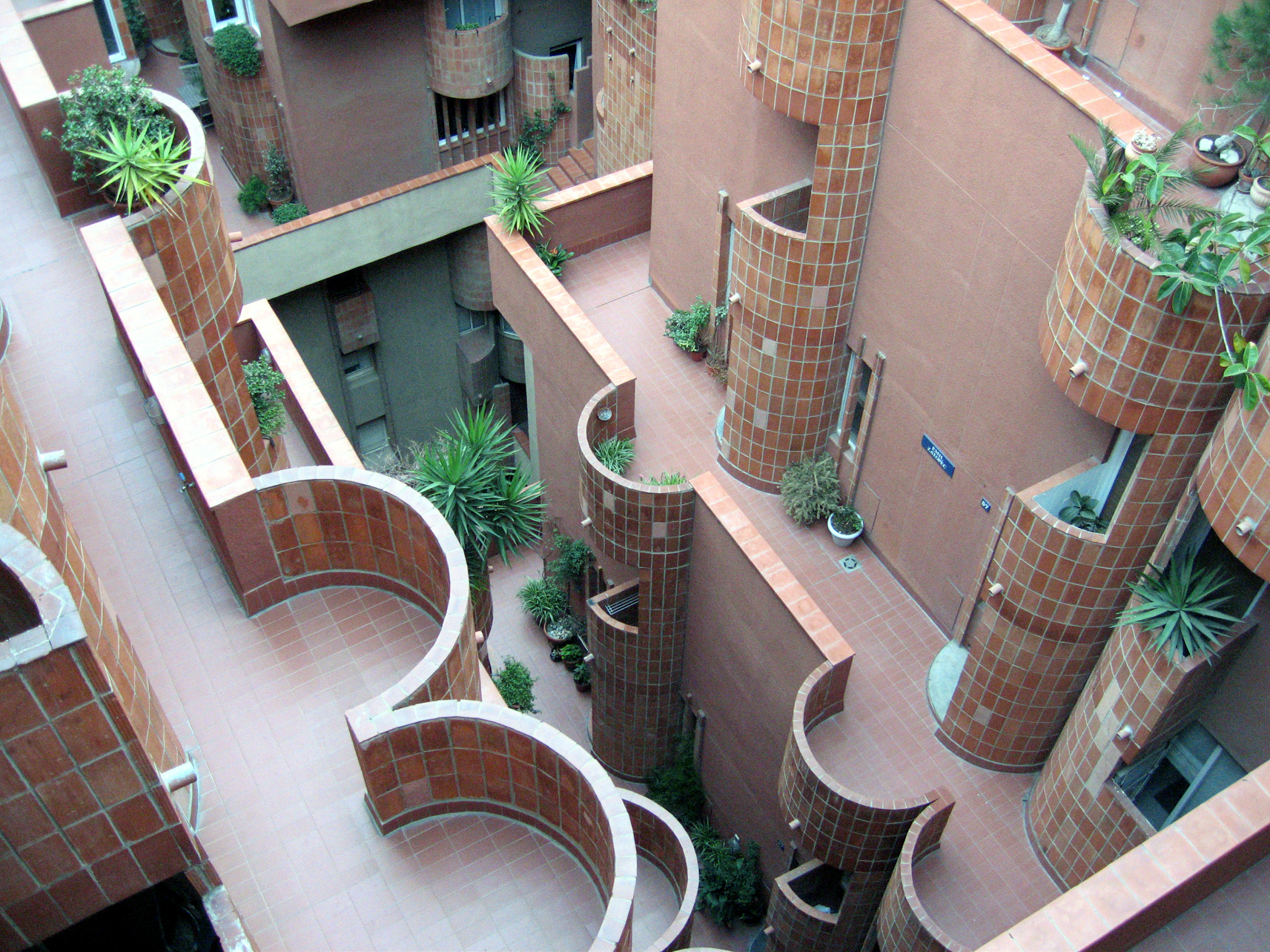
Balconies

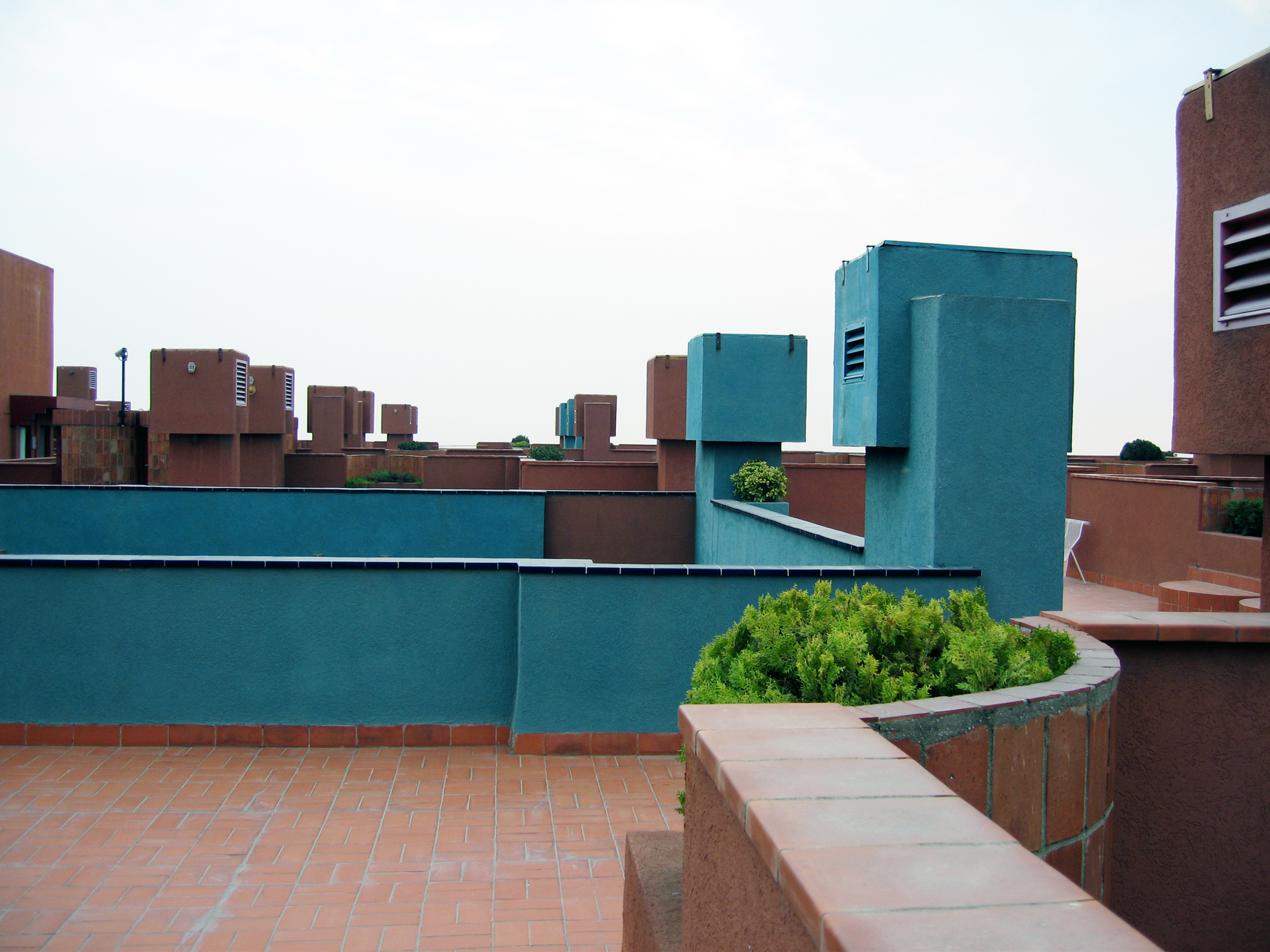
Roof

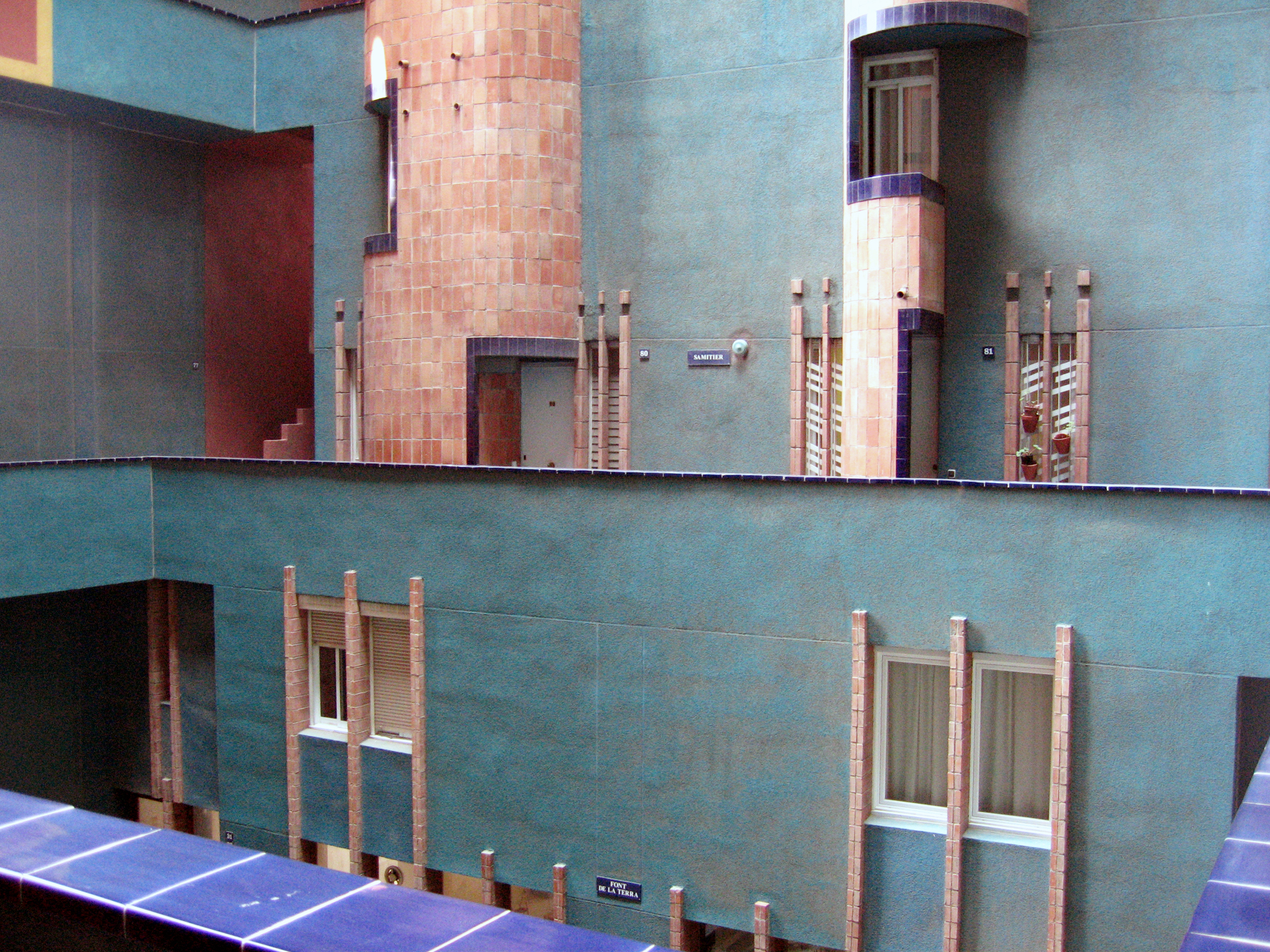
Inner façade

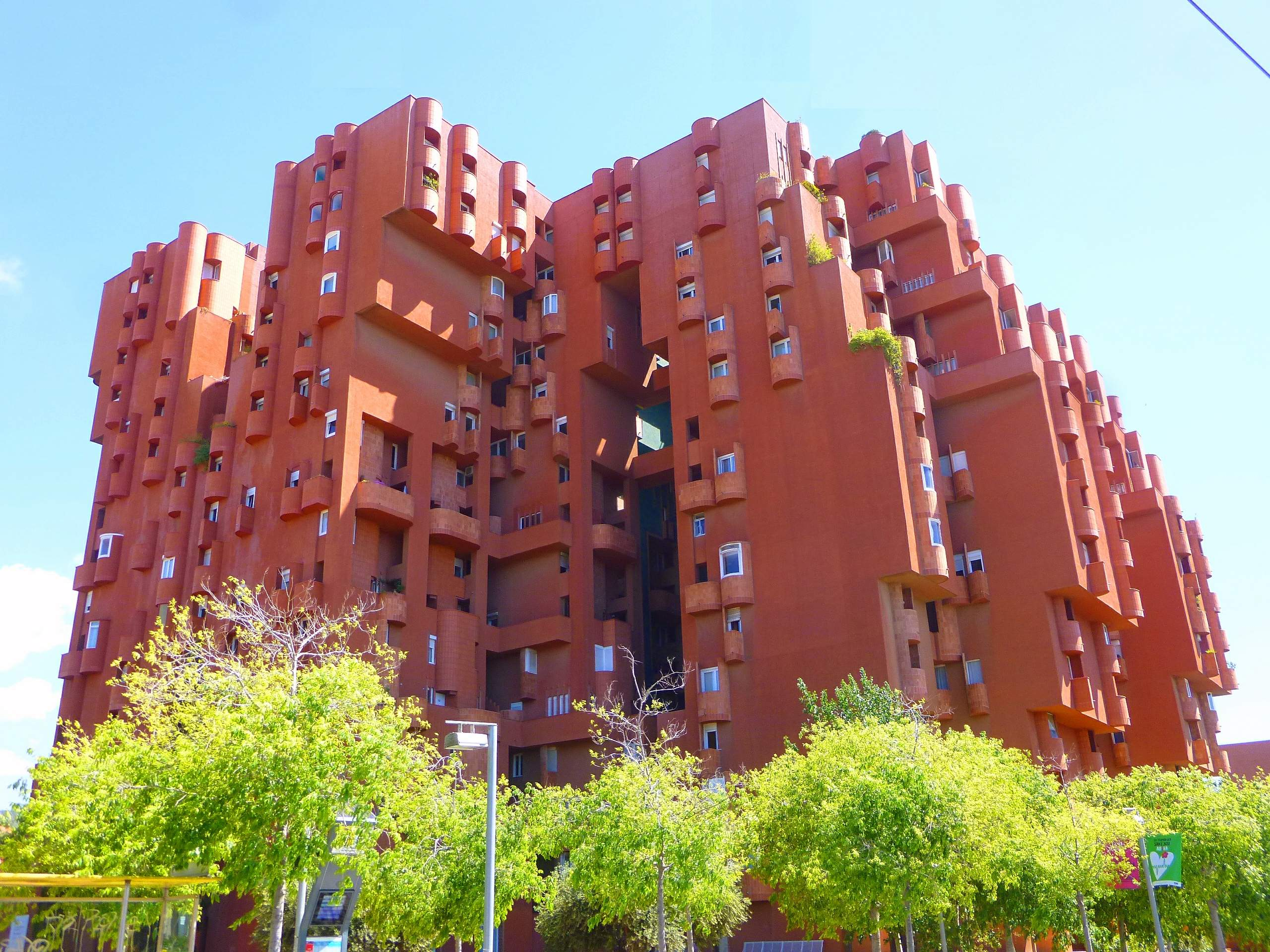
Overall view

== See also ==
- Unité d'habitation
- La Muralla Roja
- Les Espaces d'Abraxas
- Antigone, Montpellier
- List of works by Ricardo Bofill Taller de Arquitectura
