= National Front of Catalonia =

National Front of Catalonia Front Nacional de Catalunya
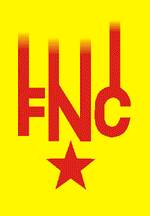
- Founded: 1940
- Dissolved: 1990
- Merged into: Republican Left of Catalonia
- Newspaper: Per Catalunya and Ara
- Ideology: Catalan nationalism Catalan independence Democratic socialism
- Political position: Left-wing
- National affiliation: Democratic Pact for Catalonia (1977–78); Democracy and Catalonia (1977–78)
- Colors: Yellow; Red

The National Front of Catalonia (Catalan: Front Nacional de Catalunya, FNC) was a Catalan nationalist party which was active between 1940 and 1990. The FNC was created in 1940 by former members of the Estat Català and the Catalan Nationalist Party, with the latter dissolving and splitting its membership between the Estat Català and the FNC. The main goals of the FNC were to present an opposing front to the Spanish State of caudillo Franco and to advocate for Catalan independence. In 1946, the FNC became an officially independent party by breaking its relationship with the Estat Català.

== Origin ==
The FNC was born in April 1940 in Paris as a patriotic front in the hands of several exiled nationalist militants of Estat Català and belonging to all the different sectors that corresponded to the ancient parties and organizations that entered Estat Català when he left Esquerra Republicana de Catalunya [ERC] May 1936. Among the founders there are: Joan Cornudella i Barberà and Antoni Andreu i Abelló, of the Catalan State Board; Manuel Cruells i Pifarré, of the Joventuts d'Estat Català; Marcel·lí Perelló i Domingo, from the old sector Catalan Nationalist Party, Jaume Martínez Vendrell and Joan Massot, from the old sector We Only!, and Enric Pagès i Montagut, Francesc Espriu and Joan Fortuny, from the old sector National Federation of Students of Catalonia. Daniel Cardona i Civit, ill, did not attend. The idea was to bring together all nationalist parties on a broad front. In practice, however, the rest of the nationalist parties ([Acció Catalana], ERC, etc.) would not be part of them as such and their presence in the FNC would be through isolated militants. State of Catalonia and all the sectors that comprised it would maintain their organizational autonomy within the FNC, although the various sectors within the Catalan State would be diluted over time.

Its members proposed to carry out a resistance for the freedom of Catalonia, human dignity and an advanced society model. We also thought that the allied troops would help the Catalan resistance to end the Spanish government regime. It wanted to be the anti-Franco independentist unifier both inside and outside Catalonia. They recruited militants from nationalist parties, former squadrons and police officers of the Generalitat de Catalunya. Former members of the ERC and Acció Catalana militants, which were almost non-existent inside, also gathered.

They lacked funding, but since 1945 they formed an Assistance Committee for FNC Combatants with money from the Catalans of America. In London, his delegate, Pere Mitjà, founded the Catalan Nationalist Grouping in Great Britain. His organ was "Opinions" and the front was made up of workers, small owners and shopkeepers.

== Armed struggle ==
In August 1940, Andreu, Cornudella, Cruells, Xammar and others entered Catalonia clandestinely and engage in espionage work for Britain. Josep Benet was the mail with the outside. In 1944, six members of the group were sentenced to six years in prison. Jaume Ribas i Surinyac contacted the British Intelligence Service in 1943, who gave them weapons and a radio station, and Gregori Font to the Deuxième Bureau (France). They also organized the Swiss evasion chain in Lisbon by the Alberes. Manuel Valls de Gomis and Jaume Cornudella i Olivé helped to flee about 800 allied aviators, while Josep Rovira i Canals organized another one for Palafrugell, Vic and Barcelona. However, in 1941 there were 126 detainees inside.

The military branch of the National Front of Catalonia, led by Jaume Martínez Vendrell, was considered to be the Catalan army of opposition to the occupying army. He suffered a tough blow with the so-called "Fall of the 50s" towards the end of 1943. Joan Cornudella and Antoni Andreu referred to it at the end of 1944.

Outside, in 1943 they contacted the National Council of Catalonia of Carles Pi i Sunyer, and when it dissolved, they became part of the National Council of Catalan Democracy . On January 4, 1945, they joined the Catalan National Bloc formed by ERC. However, when President Josep Irla i Bosch formed his government 14 September 1945 did not consult the FNC, which led to his marginalization in high politics to exile This will make them dump into actions inside.

Until 1943 Manuel Cruells and Joan Cornudella were in charge of the management. Since 1944 the FNC scheme was:

- Executive Council
- Consell de Barcelona Ciutat
- Council of Barcelona Circumscription
- Council of other Catalan regions
- Delegation to France, with headquarters in Perpignan (Jaume Cornudella)
- Delegation to London

On 18 April 1946 the FNC I Conference was held in Dosrius (Maresme), in which the organization was restructured. It is estimated that it had about 3,000 militants:

- Executive council, consisting of a president (Antoni Andreu i Abelló), a general secretary ( Jaume Martínez i Vendrell) and five advisers (press, propaganda, social action, organization, services and youth) among them Manuel Viusà i Camps and Antoni Malaret i Amigó.
- National Council, with a section for Barcelona city and another for regions.
- Catalan aid, for retaliators.

They also advocated social solidarity, freedom of conscience, a social policy of collective welfare, the right to independence and conformity with the Atlantic Charter.

At the same time, the number of actions in the interior was multiplied, in particular by the hanging and the painted ones, since until the end of 1946 they did not have enough weapons to carry out organized resistance actions. The September 11 of 1944 a squad led by Martínez and Vendrell hung a sign on the air shuttle from the port of Barcelona. April 23 of 1945 hung a sign in the Sagrada Familia and in November 1945 in Palau de la Música Catalana. In February 1946 put a firecracker and painted at the University of Barcelona and created the Front Catalan University (1942), which often confronted the members of the Sindicato Español Universitario of Pablo Porta Busoms.

In January 1946, weapons and explosives passed through the border, which strengthened the military section, while in April Jaume Cornudella and Manuel Valls de Gomis began to emit with a short-wave radio. The March 24 of 1946 put an explosive on the Victoria Monument, and on June 6 they displayed a flag at the Montjuic stadium, but on June 8, 1946 They suffered a tough blow with the fall of the military section of the FNC, with 14 detainees and four more in contumacy, and most of them were confiscated. Jaume Martínez Vendrell was sentenced to 20 years in prison, and Josep Serra i Estruch to six years. This was the loss of the printing press and much of the weapons.
