= Miquel Badia =

Spanish politician (1906–1936)

Miquel Badia i Capell
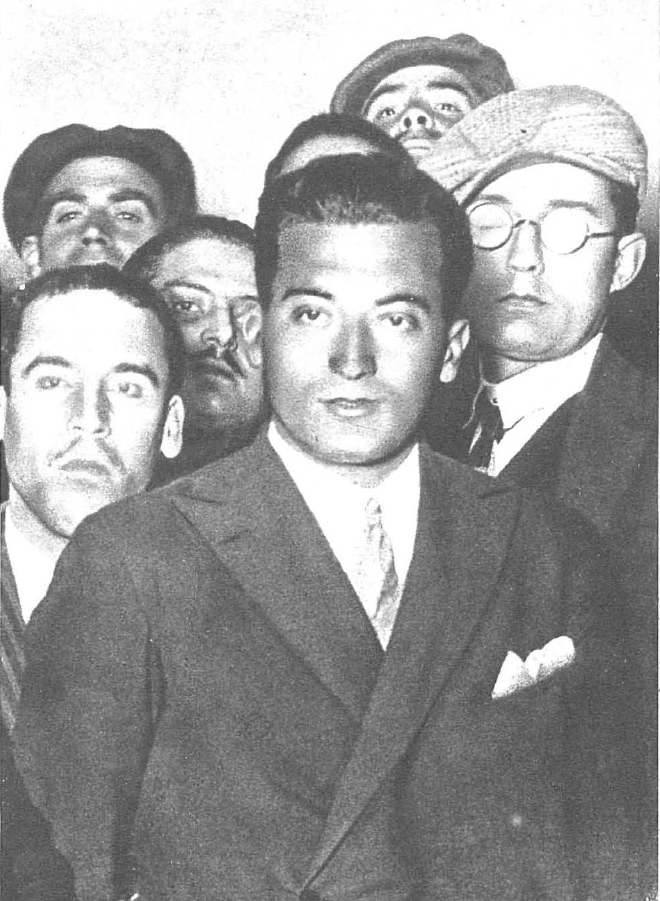
- Miquel Badia in 1933
- Born: 10 March 1906; Torregrossa, Catalonia
- Died: 28 April 1936 (aged 30); Barcelona, Catalonia
- Cause of death: Assassination
- Resting place: Montjuïc Cemetery, Barcelona
- Political party: Estat Català

Miquel Badia i Capell (10 March 1906 – 28 April 1936) was a prominent Catalan politician and militant of the separatist party Estat Català during the period of the Second Spanish Republic. He served as Chief of Public Order of the Generalitat of Catalonia and was one of the organizers of the revolutionary events known as the Events of 6 October 1934.

Badia was also a member of the JERC. Among his followers, he was famously nicknamed Capità Collons (Captain Balls).

== Youth ==
Born into a peasant family, Badia studied his secondary education in Lleida. In 1922, he moved to Barcelona to become a merchant navy pilot. A radical nationalist, he joined Estat Català just after its foundation by Francesc Macià and later became a member of its armed wing, Bandera Negra, of which he was one of the founders. In 1925, he was one of the conspirators in the Garraf plot, an attempt to assassinate Alfonso XIII of Spain during the king's visit to Catalonia, but he was arrested and sentenced to twelve years in prison. He was transferred to the prisons of Alcalá de Henares and Ocaña, where he spent three years. In 1930, following the fall of dictator Miguel Primo de Rivera, he was amnestied.

== Political activity during the Second Spanish Republic ==
After the proclamation of the Second Spanish Republic in 1931, Badia was appointed head of the Republican Left Youth–Estat Català (JEREC). In 1932, the minister Josep Dencàs made him his secretary. On 24 November 1933, he mobilized the escamots, the paramilitary militia of the JEREC, deploying them to restore public services paralyzed by a strike.

Described by Stanley G. Payne as proto-fascists, both Badia and Dencàs spoke about paving the way for ERC to become the single party of a future independent Catalan state built under a "national" and "socialist" order.

Always collaborating with Dencàs, in December 1933 he was appointed Secretary of Public Order of the Generalitat, and in March 1934 he became Chief of Services of the General Commissariat of Public Order of the Generalitat (a position that formally meant being the deputy chief of the police forces in Catalonia). He relentlessly pursued violence from some uncontrollable elements of the FAI, which earned him the nickname "Capità Collons" ("Captain Balls").

In September 1934, police under Badia's orders entered the courtroom of the Barcelona Palace of Justice during the disobedience trial against lawyer Josep Maria Xammar, a personal friend of Badia, and arrested prosecutor Manuel Sancho. Following the incident, Badia was forced to resign (see Procés Xammar).

He was one of the organizers of the revolutionary day of 6 October 1934. Because of these events, he had to go into exile until 1936 in France, America, Germany, Belgium, and finally Andorra. With the victory of the Popular Front (Spain) in the 1936 Spanish general election, he returned and devoted himself to reorganizing the Estat Català Youth.

== Assassination ==
I am, forgive my immodesty, an idealist and I am convinced that idealists can only have one brilliant moment. Do you know what it is? To die in the struggle.

— Miquel Badia i Capell, Letter to a friend (Paris, 21 February 1935)

On 28 April 1936, Miquel Badia was assassinated as he was leaving his home with his brother Josep by gunmen of the FAI, probably in retaliation for the campaign he had led against their illegal activities while serving as Chief of Services of the General Commissariat of Public Order (CGOP).

The assassination occurred at 3:30 pm in front of number 38 Muntaner Street. The two brothers were leaving their residence (number 52) and crossed paths with two individuals who shot Miquel once in the back and, when he turned around, twice more in the chest and abdomen. The second individual fired a single shot to the face of Josep, who died a few minutes later. The gunmen immediately fled in a car waiting across the street.

=== Hypothesis about FAI and Falangist involvement ===
Regarding the authorship of the assassination, the most likely hypothesis is that the perpetrators were gunmen from the FAI, as the getaway car was commonly used by members of this organization to carry out sabotage on trams and buses. One of the regular drivers was the known gunman Justo Bueno Pérez, who was identified as the driver of the vehicle on that very day. Additionally, both the owner of the car and the owner of the garage where it was kept were also members. (Note: It is worth remembering that a few months later the journalist Josep Maria Planes was also assassinated with six shots to the head by uncontrollable members of the FAI due to his passionate articles denouncing this assassination and other acts of FAI violence.)

A second, less credible possibility considered was that the gunmen belonged to the Juventudes Antimarxistas, since a group led by a former police officer, Juan Segura Nieto, had recently been acquiring pistols and meeting in places close to the Badia residence. In fact, the resemblance between Segura and the FAI gunman Bueno was extraordinary, and witnesses often confused them. Furthermore, the arrival in Barcelona of several militants from the Falange Española de las JONS who intended to commit terrorist attacks and assassinations had also been detected. This hypothesis was stated in press declarations by the investigating judge, Emilià Vilalta, probably with the aim of diverting attention from the real suspects in the FAI environment. (Note: A few months later the journalist Josep Maria Planes was also assassinated with six shots to the head by uncontrolled members of the FAI because of his outspoken articles denouncing this assassination and other acts of fascist violence.)

The alibis of the probable assassins could not be disproved, and the frequent presence of the suspected FAI members at the garage was not sufficient evidence. Moreover, the sabotage acts committed during the last transport strike, which they had admitted to, could not be sanctioned because they had been amnestied by the republican government. Therefore, the new judge of the case, Márquez Caballero, ended up releasing them all.

== See also ==
- Cases dels Canonges affair

== Bibliography ==
- Caudet, Francisco (1978). Historia política de Cataluña. Producciones Editoriales. ISBN 84-365-1195-6.
- Escofet, Frederic (1973). Al servei de Catalunya i de la República. La victòria. 19 de juliol 1936. Paris: Edicions Catalanes De París. p. 220. ISBN 2-85041-013-6.
- Huertas Clavería, J.M. (2012). "El complot que quería catalanizar en 1936 la revolución popular". In Gonzàlez i Vilalta, Arnau; Ucelay-Da Cal, Enric (eds.). Contra Companys, 1936: La frustración nacionalista ante la Revolución. Valencia: Universitat de València. pp. 69–76. ISBN 978-84-370-8915-7.
- Mauri, Luis (13 May 2018). "Torra y el 'capità Collons'". El Periódico.
- Mestre i Campi, Jesús (director) (1998). Diccionari d'Història de Catalunya. Edicions 62. p. 1147. ISBN 84-297-3521-6.
- Mota Muñoz, José Fernando (2012). "'Precursores de la unificación': el España Club y el Voluntariado Español, una experiencia unitaria de la extrema derecha barcelonesa (1935-1936)". Historia y Política. 28: 273–303. ISSN 1575-0361.
- Payne, Stanley G. (1993). Spain's First Democracy: The Second Republic, 1931-1936. Madison, WI: The University of Wisconsin Press.
- Rubiralta, Fermí (2011). Miquel Badia. Vida i mort d'un líder separatista (PDF). Barcelona: Fundació Josep Irla.
- Ucelay-Da Cal, Enric (2002). "The Shadow of a doubt: fascism and communist alternatives in Catalan separatism, 1919-1939" (PDF). Working Papers. 198. Barcelona: Institut de Ciències Polítiques i Socials. ISSN 1133-8962.
- Ucelay-Da Cal, Enric (2005). "Los "malos de la película": las Joventuts d'Esquerra Republicana-Estat Català y la problemática de un "fascismo catalán"". Ayer. 59: 147–172. ISSN 1134-2277. JSTOR 41325131.
- Ucelay-Da Cal, Enric (2012). Gonzàlez i Vilalta, Arnau; Ucelay-Da Cal, Enric (eds.). Contra Companys, 1936: La frustración nacionalista ante la Revolución. Valencia: Universitat de València. pp. 111–150. ISBN 978-84-370-8915-7.
