= Garraf plot =

Attempted regicide against King Alfonso XIII of Spain in 1925

The Garraf plot was an attempted regicide of Spain's King Alfonso XIII by Catalan separatists in Barcelona in June 1925.

== Background ==
Catalan nationalist groups blamed King Alfonso XIII for enabling the dictatorship of General Primo de Rivera and repressing Catalan national identity. On May 6, 1925, King Alfonso XIII's trip to Catalonia was announced. A group of radical militants within Acció Catalana, the Grup dels Set ("Group of Seven") initially came up with the plan to assassinate the king during this trip. However, the plot was mostly carried out by La Bandera Negra, a clandestine military organization within Estat Català, a separate Catalan nationalist party. The conspirators believed that in the confusion following the assassination of the monarch, the military would carry out acts of violence against the population of Barcelona, which would in return increase popular support for the escamots of Estat Català, who could then seize the most significant buildings and proclaim the Catalan Republic.

== Assassination attempts ==
The visit was scheduled for May 26. La Bandera Negra initially planned to detonate a bomb in the tunnel between Garraf and Sitges as the king's train passed through. On May 23, six members of Bandera Negra made their first attempt to place the bomb took. However, they found that they lacked the appropriate tools to lift the ballast from the track and plant the explosive. They hid the bomb in vegetation next to the road, intending to return the next day. On the 24th, the conspirators missed the train in Barcelona and could not reach Garraf. This setback led the conspirators to modify the plan to instead place the bomb in one of the tunnel vents. When on the 25th the conspirators again went to Garraf to plant the explosive device, the presence of the Civil Guard prevented them from carrying out their plans.

The next day, they decided to instead attack the monarch in Barcelona while he passed through the Ramblas on his way to a gala performance at the Liceu, on May 29. Jaume Julià, the member of Bandera Negra appointed to carry the bomb, did not appear at the scheduled time. Later it was learned that Julià's father discovered the plot and prevented the twenty-year-old Julià from participating. Given this, a substitute was appointed, who may have been Miquel Ferrer, from the Grup dels Set, or Jaume Miravitlles, an escamot from Estat Català. Either way, the designated conspirator, who was armed with pistols and carried the bomb inside a bouquet of flowers, could not carry out the operation due to heavy police surveillance.

The conspirators considered returning to their initial plan and detonating the bomb in the Garraf tunnel when the king left Barcelona. Four members of La Bandera Negra and two members of the Grup dels Set went to Garraf on June 6 to scout the area. However, an infiltrator in the conspiracy, Joan Terrés, also known as Josep Talavera, informed the police, who were waiting for them at the station. 28 conspirators were arrested.

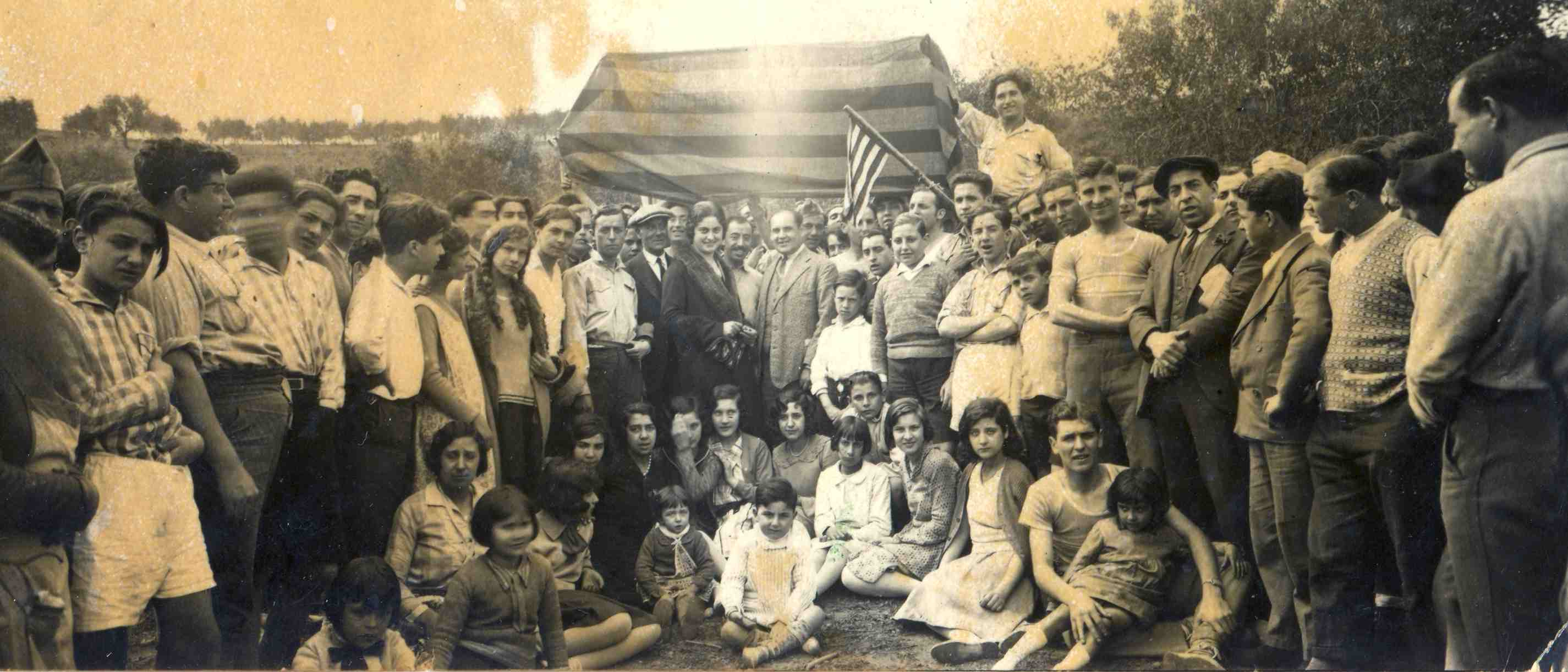
One of the festive acts for the liberation of Marcelino Perelló, on April 1, 1930. Perelló himself appears in the center of the photograph, together with his fiancée Edelmira Valls.

== Aftermath ==
The dictatorship used the plot to justify widespread crackdowns on Catalan separatist groups, arresting numerous members not only of Estat Català, but also of Acció Catalana and Unió Catalanista.

In July 1925, Jaume Compte, Marcelino Perelló, Jaume Julià, Miquel Badia, Deogràcies Civit, Francisco Ferrer, Josep Garriga, Emili Granier, Ramon Fabregat, and Antoni Arguelaguet were brought to trial. Granier, Fabregat, and Arguelaguet were released on bail and fled. The trial of the remaining seven was conducted by the military, who were accused of torturing the detainees and not following the proper legal procedure. Eventually, Compte was accused of being the leader of the group and sentenced to death by garrote, as were Perelló, Julià, and Garriga. Their sentences were commuted to life imprisonment. Badia, Civit, and Ferrer were sentenced to 12 years in prison. All those imprisoned were granted amnesty at the end of the Primo de Rivera dictatorship in 1930.
