= Sant Just Desvern =

- Municipality
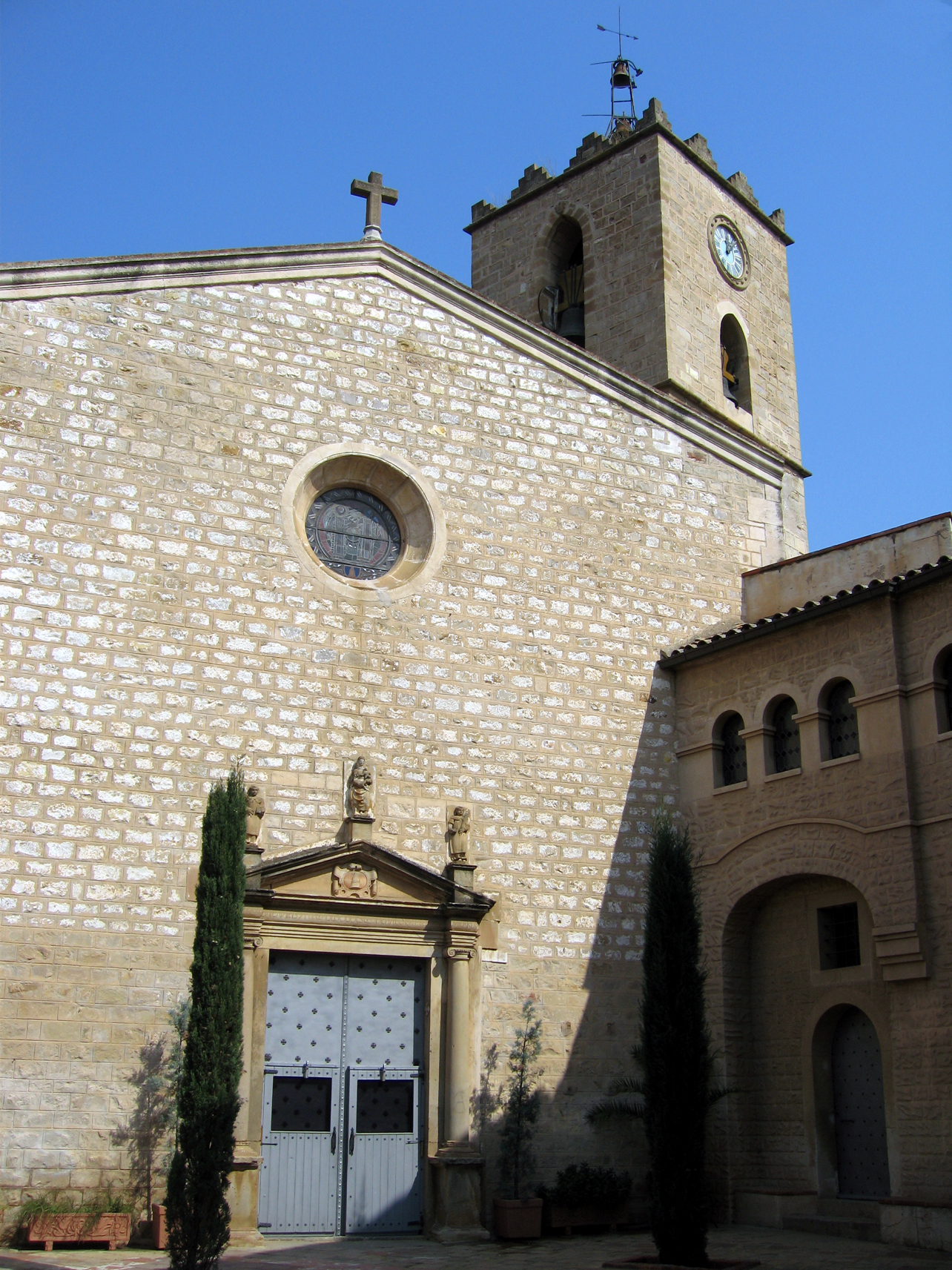
- Parish church

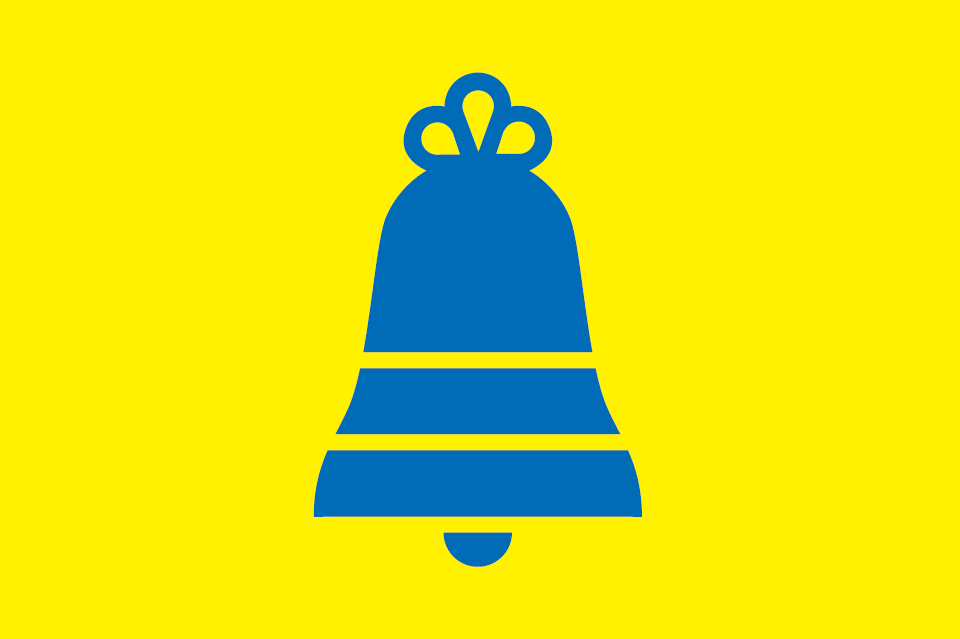
- Flag Coat of arms

- Location in Catalonia Sant Just Desvern (Spain)
- Coordinates: 41.383°N 2.075°E
- Country: Spain
- Community: Catalonia
- Province: Barcelona
- Comarca: Baix Llobregat

Government
  - Mayor: Joan Basagañas (2020)

Area
  - Total: 7.8 km^{2} (3.0 sq mi)
- Elevation: 122 m (400 ft)

Population (2025-01-01)
  - Total: 21,037
  - Density: 2,700/km^{2} (7,000/sq mi)
- Website: santjust.cat

Sant Just Desvern (Old Catalan for 'Saint Justin of-the-Buckthorn'; Catalan pronunciation: [ˈsaɲ ˈʒuzd dəzˈβɛɾn]) is a town near Barcelona, in the comarca of the Baix Llobregat, Catalonia, Spain.

Sant Just Desvern is located in the 2,078317º of longitude and 41,381611º of latitude. It is situated at 122 m (average) above sea level. The maximum height is located at 405 meters above sea level, almost in the top of Turó de Merlès (416.7 m), and the lowest spot of this town is about 40 meters, located at the park of Torreblanca.

The surface of the town is about 7.8 km^{2}. The town has 35 km of streets. It has good connections to arrive to N-340, the highway A-2 and Rondes de Dalt and Litoral.

In the first division of comarcal, Sant Just Desvern was included in Barcelonès (1936). But in the comarcal revision in 1987, along with Esplugues de Llobregat, they became part of Baix Llobregat.

The municipality borders are Sant Joan Despí to the southwest, Esplugues de Llobregat to the east and Sant Feliu de Llobregat to the northeast. Barcelona is almost in the border line.

The first mention of the town in a document dates back to the year 965. Its coat of arms depicts a blue bell inside a golden rhombus.

The local city council uses the slogan pobleiciutat (Catalan for 'townandcity').

Sant Just Desvern is home to several celebrities including players for the F.C. Barcelona football club and politicians including the ex-president of the Generalitat de Catalunya, José Montilla.

== Demography ==
1900	1930	1950	1970	1986	2012
1101	2328	2931	9226	11,379	15,874

The population was 15,874 in 2012.

== Sights ==
The town is home to Walden 7, an iconic apartment complex designed by Ricardo Bofill Taller de Arquitectura. The building is 16 stories high and its surface is 31.140 m^{2}. It has 446 apartments, in which about a thousand people live. It has three swimming pools on the top.

Nearby is a concrete chimney designed by engineer Clifford Tomlinson (1924) and restored by Alfredo Arribas (approx.1985-1996). It is 105 meters in height and it was the highest chimney in Europe when it was constructed (1924). At its top there is now a mirador which is accessed by an elevator with transparent floor and ceiling. Lower on the chimney is a ring-shaped restaurant with panoramic views. Adjacent to these is another former part of the same cement factory, repurposed as Ricardo Bofill's home and offices of his Taller de Arquitectura, known as La Fábrica.

The Church of Sant Just Desvern is documented since 987. The actual building is of 1571 and after the Spanish civil war was reconstructed because it was burnt.

Moreover, Sant Just has some ancient farmhouses that are regarded like patrimony of the town. Those are Can Campreciós (1326), Can Ginestar (1403), Can Segrera (1709), Can Cardona(1306), Can Solanes(S. XVI-XVII), Can Pedrosa(1077), Can Carbonell(S. XIX)etc.

== Economy ==
The economy of St. Just is based by industrial sector and the service sector, which have a high specialization. The most important industries are chemical-pharmaceutical, perfume, machinery manufacturing, electrical equipment manufacturing and precision instruments. For services are machinery rental, whole sale trade and income distribution.

== The weather ==
It is a Mediterranean climate. It has a mild climate, warm in winter and very hot in summer. The temperature in Sant Just Desvern is always positive, seldom goes down zero degrees. The temperature is between 5 degrees and 30 degrees.

The rain is not very common in Sant Just Desvern; usually it rains between 1 and 5 days a month. Rainfalls are not abundant and mainly are in autumn and spring. It rains between 450 and 500 mm every year.

== Traditions ==
Sant Just has a particular tradition. Since 1976, the "Bearing Go Kart Race" is organized annually (karts de coixinets). The karts are constructed for the participants and are driven by two people, the driver and the runner, respectively. As the vehicles don't have any motor, they go down a descent during all the race.

Since 1980, Sant Just has the gang of the giants. The giants are Pastor (3,6 m height and 38 kg), Justa (3,55 height and 37 kg), Monserrat (2,1 height and 11 kg), Gentil (3.90 height and 60 kg), Flordeneu (3.7 m height and 31 kg) and the giant of Canigó that belongs to the School Canigó). Giants go to walk and dance each town festival.

Sant Just has a gang called dragons created in 2010. They are the main people who organize the fireworks in the town. Those fireworks aren't in the sky; they are on the street floor. The demons burn some ceptrot (a kind of torches but with sparks) and the people dance under it. It is very common in some towns in Catalonia and other kind of fireworks.

Another gang of Sant Just Desvern is the Dragons. When it is time of fireworks the dragon walks along the town dancing with them. The dragon throws fire and sparks, therefore, comes together with the demons.

== Centers of culture ==
Ateneu de Sant Just Desvern is a cultural association founded in 1918. There are some activities related topainting, theater, writing, dancing, hiking and cinema.

The Casal de Joves is another cultural association but this one is destined for a young people. The association organizes some workshops. It has public room with computers and different areas to play games.

== Education ==
Public education

Sant Just Desvern has a public kindergarten called "Marrecs", three state schools for the age between 3 and 12 years (Monserrat, Canigó and Montseny) and a secondary school called "Institute of Sant Just Desvern". It does not have any universities.

Private education

Between (0-3):Noah's Ark, Children's Park, Tictac, Abc kínder Garden, School Pro, La Casita De Lore, Madre Sacrament

Between (3-18):La Miranda, Princess Margaret School, School Palcam, School Mare de Déu of Núria

== Sports ==
Sant Just Desvern has two sports facilities and the Futbol Club Sant Just Desvern. There are two hiking associations: Secció Excursionista de l'Ateneu Sanjustenc (SEAS) and Els Isard. It also has a hockey club, a cycling club and a sardana dance group.

== Sports Facilities ==
- La Bonaigua: (gym and swimming pools): Passeig de la Muntanya
- Can Melich: (gym, tennis, paddle, swimming pools and squash): Avinguda Onze de Setembre

== Important people ==
- Politics : Daniel Cardona i Civit, Antoni Malaret i Amigó, Ferran Mascarell i Canalda, Josep Maria Rañé.
- Architecture: Ricardo Bofill
- Literature: Joan Margarit i Consarnau
- Music: Lleonard Balada Ibañez, Puertas Brothers
- Theater and cinema: Clara Segura, Ferran Rañé i Blasco
- Television: Àngel Casas, Carlos Latre

== Sites of interest ==
- Library Joan Margarit: Street Carles Mercader, 17, 08960 Sant Just Desvern, Barcelona, Spain
- City hall of Sant Just desvern: Plaça de Verdaguer, 2, 08960 Sant Just Desvern, Spain
- Walden 7, an apartment complex and a mini city in itself
