= Daniel Cardona =

Spanish politician (1890–1943)

Daniel Cardona i Civit (20 August 1890 – 7 March 1943), also known with the pen name of Vibrant or the nickname of l'Irlandès (meaning the Irishman), was a Spanish politician, a prominent figure of 20th-century radical Catalan separatism.

== Biography ==
He was born in the Jovellanos Street of Barcelona. On 25 November 1905, at the age of 15, he threw, from the Haberdasher's where he was employed, a bucket of wet sawdust to a group of Spanish soldiers returning from attacking and breaking the headquarters of the ¡Cu-Cut! and the newspaper La Veu de Catalunya.

He worked with and became a close friend of the Catalan poet Joan Salvat-Papasseit, who authored the prologue of Cardona's first book, "La batalla", published in 1923. He became councillor of Sant Just Desvern on 1 April 1922. Exiled to France during the dictatorship of Miguel Primo de Rivera, he was among the plotters of the 1924 "acció del Garraf", a failed attempt of regicide on Alfonso XIII. Established in Perpignan, he collaborated with Francesc Macià. He was a keen defender of armed insurrection against Spain in the 1920s and the 1930s inspired by the Easter Rising in Ireland of 1916. He founded the radical separatist organization Nosaltres Sols!, and the weekly journal of the same name.

Just after the proclamation of the Second Spanish Republic in April 1931, he became Mayor of Sant Just Desvern on 15 April having won the election for a local list named Esquerra Catalana against a list related to the Regionalist League of Catalonia. He also won the elections of January 1934 this time with a list named National Front against the Republican Left of Catalonia. After the Events of 6 October 1934, he was detained by the Civil Guard (a Spanish rural police force) in Ponts (West Catalonia) and sent to prison in Lleida (West Catalonia main city). The Spanish government ordered him to be transferred to Madrid but amid confusion he escaped. He went into exile to France after receiving te condition of political refugee in Brussels. After the victory for the Popular Front in the elections of 1936, he returned to Sant Just Desvern and retook office in February 1936.

In the context of the Spanish Civil War, he was interrogated and threatened by the anarchists in Aragon after being accused of helping priests hidden in the town of Maella to escape to France. Some versions stay that he was allowed to return to Catalonia after the intervention of the French Consulate in Barcelona. Other versions stay that he was detained by the anarchist and was to be shot but was saved by other anarchists that knew him from the exile during Primo de Rivera's dictatorship. After the May Days of 1937, when the Catalan police became controlled by the Spanish Republic government he moved again to Perpignan in Northern Catalonia. However, he kept collaborating with the Catalan government and traveled secretly to Barcelona in several occasions.

The French secret services informed Cardona of speculative plans by the French Armed Forces to occupy Francoist Spain up to the river Ebro. He nominated Jaume Martínez Vendrell as a military commander of the organisation which would become the National Front of Catalonia. The National Front of Catalonia collaborated with the French Resistance, the British Secret Service and the Polish secret services in the context of World War II and represented the main opposition group to the occupation of Catalonia by Fascist Spain in the early period between 1939 and 1947.

Having furtively returned to Sant Just Desvern, Cardona, gravely ill, died in his home in March 1943.

== Family ==
He married Madrona Gelabert i Castellví on 9 February 1918. They had a daughter, Núria, and two sons, Jordi and Francesc. Madrona lost another son when Spanish militars under the orders of the brutal general Severiano Martínez Anido, Barcelona head of police Miguel Arlegui Bayonés and a military magistrate attacked their home looking for Daniel Cardona who had escaped to his first exile (Cardona referred to this period as the dictatorship Anido-Arlegui - see Pistolerismo and Sindicatos Libres for references to the period). Madrona Gelabert died on 1 May 1931 after a long illness.

He remarried in 1936 to Jeanne, a Basque journalist he met during his 1934-1936 exile in France who later became awarded by the French government for her work in the French Resistance.

His son Jordi Cardona Gelabert (1919-1999) was member of the National Front of Catalonia and Republican Left of Catalonia (ERC). He was elected councillor of Sant Just Desvern in 1983.

== Works ==
At the age of 12, he already sent articles to junior magazines such as En Patufet. Later he also sent articles to the weekly satirical magazine ¡Cu-Cut!. Cardona writing is sharp, he was a propagandist for the liberation of Catalonia through insurrection. There are three known books by Cardona:

- La Batalla. Meaning in English The Battle. Published in 1923, it is a recompilation of articles published as Vibrant. It is prologued by his friend and poet Joan Salvat-Papasseit.
- Res de nou al Pirineu... Meaning in English Nothing new in the Pyrenees... and published in 1933 explains the misadventures during his first exile in France during Primo de Rivera dictatorship. He describes discussions and meetings with all sorts of exiles including Spanish syndicalists, Basque, Gallegan, and Hindu nationalists.
- Per la pàtria i per la llibertat. Meaning in English For the homeland and for freedom, it was published in 1934 and recompiled some articles related to the organization Nosaltres Sols!.

He published extensive articles in different publications until just before his death. During his third and last exile in France, in a letter to his son Jordi in 1938, he mentions that the Department of Propaganda of the Generalitat de Catalunya would soon publish one book written by him. Some personal documents of Cardona, mainly from the period 1923 - 1930, are in the Historic Archive of the City of Barcelona (in Catalan Arxiu Històric de la Ciutat de Barcelona).

== Use of the figure of Cardona by Spanish nationalists ==
Spanish nationalists try to use the figure of Daniel Cardona to accuse Catalan nationalists of racism against Spaniards or of showing sympathy for Fascism and Nazi Germany. (Note: He denounced an invasion of "Andalusians" and "Castilians" pointing out that "Feeling like an instinctive repulsion for work, they come to our land to look for the chickpeas that they find difficult to find in theirs" (Núñez Ruiz, 2018). He also claimed that "a skull of Ávila will never be like one of the Plain of Vic. Anthropology speaks more eloquently than a 42 barrel" (Laínz, 2012, p. 261; Ferreras, 2018; Calleja, 2018)) They present his writings

Nevertheless, his writings present an anticolonial view and explicitly condemn fascism. In a 1934 article, Daniel Cardona contraposes his nationalism which "goes from the individual to the State" to fascism which "goes from the state to the individual". Cardona's nationalism "respects and keeps the essence of the individual, of the family, of the town, of the county and of the nation". Conversely, fascism "subjects individuals to the State: the individual, the family, the town, the county and the nation". He continues "the state conceived by nationalism is the organisation which regulates liberty." Conversely, "the fascist state is anti-liberal, uniformist and tyrannical." The National Front of Catalonia he founded passed clandestinely into Spain and then Gibraltar, British, Polish and Belgian aviators as well as Jews of all nationalities.

== Bibliography ==
- Calleja, José María (2018-05-15). "Torra dice que son "bestias" españolas". Eldiario.es.
- Cobeña i Guàrdia, Judith (1996). "Daniel Cardona i Civit". Miscel·lània d'estudis santjustencs (7): 65–101. ISSN 2385-4278.
- Camprodon i Bertran, Ricard (1992). "Josep Hurtuna: un pintor santjustenc". Miscel·lània d'estudis santjustencs (4). ISSN 2385-4278.
- Ferreras, Carmen (2018-04-18). "El cráneo de Ávila". La Opinión de Zamora.
- Laínz, Jesús (2012). Desde Santurce a Bizancio: El poder nacionalizador de las palabras. Encuentro. ISBN 978-8499207995.
- Martínez Fiol, David (2018). "El nacionalismo revolucionario catalán: militarismo, cultura, sindicalismo y función pública. El caso de Daniel Domingo Montserrat (1900-1968)". Hispania Nova: Revista de Historia Contemporánea (16). Getafe: Charles III University of Madrid: 69. doi:10.20318/hn.2018.4032. ISSN 1138-7319.
- Etxarri, Tonia (2018-05-14). "Para echarse a temblar". El Correo.
- Masdéu i Térmens, Raimon (1992). "Composició de l'Ajuntament de Sant Just Desvern (1897-1955)". Miscel·lània d'estudis santjustencs (4). ISSN 2385-4278.
- Núñez Ruiz, Rafael (2018-05-13). "Sin precedentes. La persecución de los nacionalistas catalanes a Francisco Oya y los profesores discrepantes". Crónica Popular (137). ISSN 2386-9879.
