= Generalitat =

Form of devolved government in the Kingdom of Spain

Generalitat (Catalan: [ʒənəɾəliˈtat], literally in English 'Generality') is the name of two major medieval and early modern political institutions and their modern-day analogues in Kingdom of Spain. The ancient Principality of Catalonia and the Kingdom of Valencia were ruled by Generalitats. Today, Catalonia and The Valencian Community have systems of self-government called Generalitats, and are two of 17 autonomous communities of Spain.

The institution of the Generalitat dates back to the 13th century when the medieval courts of the ancient Principality of Catalonia and the Kingdom of Valencia respectively were created. The term originally referred to a delegation of members of the Corts, who oversaw the implementation of the decisions of the Corts between sessions, and is derived from the Catalan Diputació del General (de Catalunya). The Catalan and Valencian Generalitats were both abolished by the Nueva Planta decrees, signed by Philip V of Spain at the start of the eighteenth century, and only reinstated after the death of Franco in 1975, although in Catalonia it also had a few-years existence during the Second Spanish Republic (1931-1939).

Today, Generalitat refers to the branches of government, not simply the executive. For example, the Catalan executive is, officially, the "Government of the Generality of Catalonia" (Govern de la Generalitat de Catalunya: cf. Government of the Kingdom of Spain, Gobierno del Reino de España), while those of the community of the Valencian Country and the Val d'Aran are known as the "Council of the Valencian Generality" (Consell de la Generalitat Valenciana). The only exception is the judiciary, as the courts of justice of Catalonia and Valencia belong to the Spanish judiciary, structured as unitary throughout Spain.

== See also ==
- Generalitat de Catalunya
- Generalitat Valenciana
