= Estat Català =

Catalan nationalist party

Catalan State Estat Català
- Leader: Josep Andreu i Domingo
- Founder: Francesc Macià
- Founded: 1922
- Preceded by: Nationalist Democratic Federation
- Ideology: Catalan independence; Catalan nationalism; Republicanism; Factions: Socialism; Communism (until 1931)
- Regional affiliation: Republican Left of Catalonia (1931–1936); National Front of Catalonia (1939–1947); Junts (since 2024)
- Parliament of Catalonia: 0 / 135

Website
- www.estatcatala.cat

Estat Català (Eastern Catalan: [əsˈtat kətəˈla], "Catalan State") is a pro-independence, nationalist, and historical political party of Catalonia. Established in 1922 and originally inspired by the Irish Sinn Féin, it is currently the oldest active party in Catalonia. Despite its modest size and representation, Estat Català had a decisive role in the formation of the modern Catalan independence movement.

== History ==
Blue Estelada (independentist flag of Catalonia) used systematically for the first time by Estat Català

Estat Català is a historical pro-independence political party in Catalonia. It was established in 1922 by Francesc Macià. Originally conceived as a national political organization advocating Catalan nationalism, its aim was to achieve Catalan statehood and oppose the dictatorship of Miguel Primo de Rivera.

Throughout the 1920s, the organization took part in efforts to oppose Primo de Rivera's regime and the monarchy. Their actions included a failed assassination attempt against King Alfonso XIII (and reportedly the royal party) in the Garraf plot. This operation was carried out by a secret paramilitary unit named Santa Germandat Catalana (Bandera Negra) that was known as the Complot de Garraf (Conspiracy of Garraf). Estat Català also raised a small army named Exèrcit Català (Catalan Army) led by Francesc Macià to take control of Catalonia from Prats-de-Mollo-la-Preste, in French Northern Catalonia. The attempt, known as the Plot of Prats de Molló, was discovered and aborted by the French police.

After Primo de Rivera's government outlawed separatist movements, the organization was forced underground and Francesc Macià went into exile. Nonetheless, Estat Català was one of the parties promoting the "San Sebastian pact" with Basque nationalism, Galician nationalists and Spanish republicans, who agreed to push for a democratic process with the Spanish monarchy.

=== Republic ===
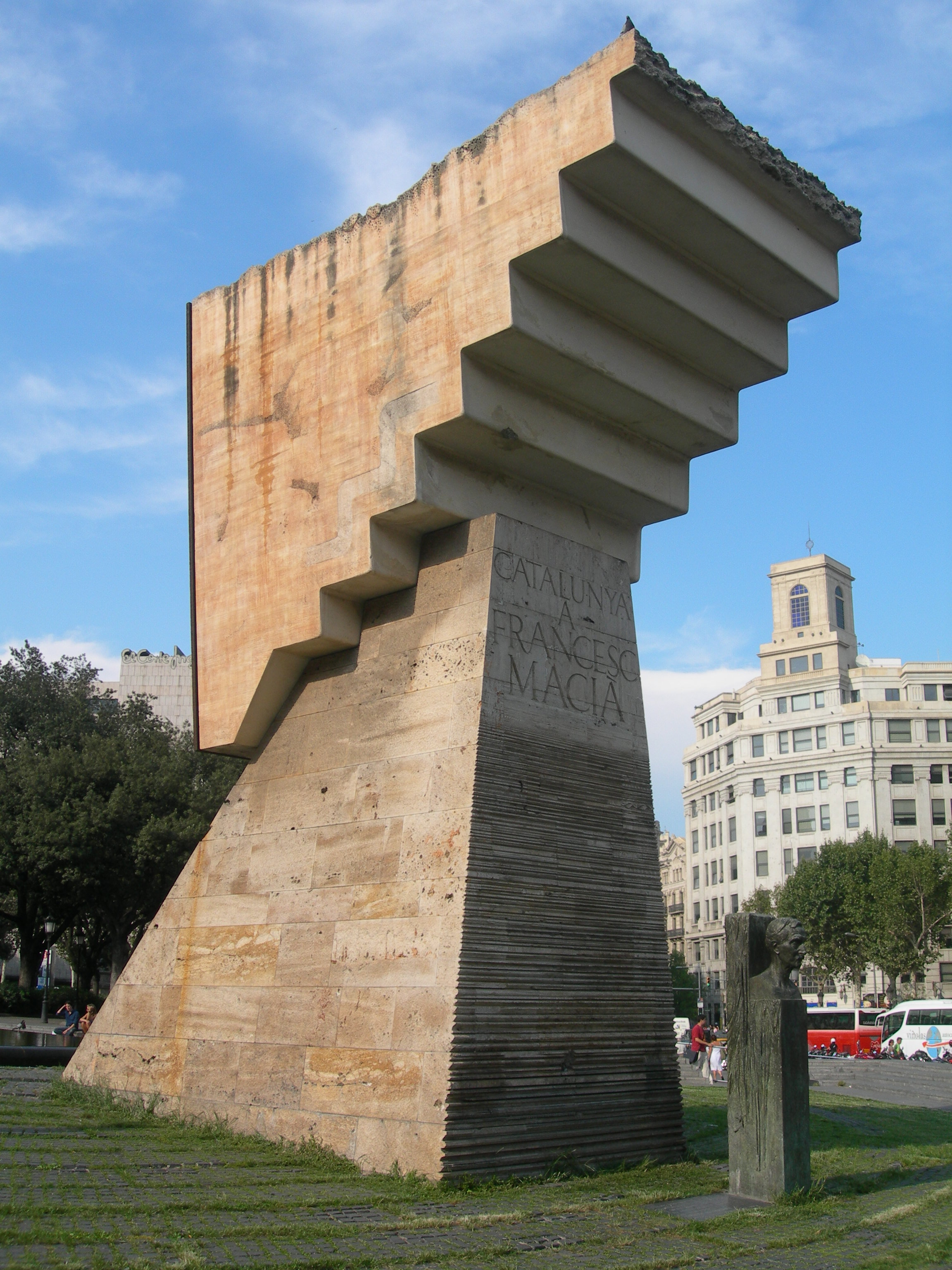
Monument to Francesc Macià in Plaça Catalunya (Barcelona).

During a conference held on 17 and 19 March 1931 at Cros street in the Sants district of Barcelona, Estat Català joined the Partit Republicà Català and the political group L'Opinió to form Esquerra Republicana de Catalunya. Inside Esquerra Republicana de Catalunya, the organizational autonomy of Estat Català was preserved and it controlled the influential youth section of the party (known as Joventuts d'Esquerra Republicana-Estat Català) and, through Francesc Macià, it controlled the leadership of the new party.

In April 1931, Francesc Macià proclaimed the Catalan Republic in Barcelona, and established the Generalitat de Catalunya. Macià, with the support of a wide majority of the Catalan people, was the first president of the re-established Generalitat. After Macià's death in December 1933, Estat Català tried to retain control of Esquerra Republicana de Catalunya, competing with the successor of Macià, the regionalist (rather than independentist) Lluís Companys (whose political background was in the Partit Republicà Català). The leadership of Estat Català fell to Josep Dencàs i Puigdollers and Estat Català took control of the Council of Interior and the political forces of Catalonia. After the failure of the armed insurrection of October 1934, that pitted the autonomous government of Catalunya and its police with the Spanish government and the Spanish Army, Estat Català, after accusing Lluís Companys of perfidy, left Esquerra Republicana de Catalunya and once again became an independent party. The youth section of Esquerra Republicana de Catalunya, traditionally strongly para-militaristic, also left the party and adhered to Estat Català. In 1936, the Spanish Civil War began.

In November 1936, Estat Català planned a coup, intended to topple the Companys-led Generalitat. The plan was to declare total independence of Catalonia as a neutral state in the Spanish Civil War, but security services mounted a pre-emptive strike; some EC leaders were detained and some fled to France. Under new leadership the Estat Català members then fought actively on the war fronts, creating its own corps of volunteers, the most important military units of Estat Català being the Pyrenaic mountain militias named Regiment Pirinenc de Catalunya, the Columna Macià-Companys and the expeditionary corp that fought in Mallorca named Columna Volant Catalana (later 132 Brigada Mixta).

=== Francoism ===
From 1939, having lost the war, many of the combatants of the party were executed or died in exile. Also, some militants in exile in France were captured by the French government, handed to the German Nazis and deported to the extermination camps of Mauthausen and Gusen. Those who stayed free joined the French Resistance and worked intensely to help Allied airmen and Jews to escape from occupied France and against the Francoist State up to his death.

Estat Català also gave Catalan nationalism a globalised vision of the Catalan nation: as early as in 1942, the party published the first map of the so-called "Catalan Countries" which included the Principality (with Northern Catalonia included), the Valencian Community, the Balearic Islands, the coterminous area of Catalonia with Aragón (known as La Franja or The Stripe) and the ancient Catalan town of Alghero in Sardinia.

In 1975, after the death of Franco, Spain started a process of becoming a democracy. In 1976, after decades of secrecy, Estat Català claimed again its legalization under the direction of historical members of the party such as Josep Planchart i Martori, Ramon Rius, Xavier Balagueró i Ràfols, Jaume Ros i Serra, Martí Torrent i Blanchart. Supporters of the independence movement of the Catalan Countries were declared interclass-conscious and they received the support of historical militants who had been active during the party's founding years like Ventura Gassol i Rovira. By the time the Spanish general elections of 1977 were held, Estat Català had not yet been legalized and had to form a coalition with other parties in a similar situation (like Esquerra Republicana de Catalunya). Estat Català achieved legalization that same year and, on 16 September 1977, was finally registered in the Registry of Political Parties of the Ministerio del Interior. Later, it spoke against the approval of the Spanish Constitution of 1978 and the regional political autonomy, considering them tools contrary to the full freedoms of the Catalans, equating it to a continuation of the Spanish State of the Caudillo Franco. According to the positioning of Estat Català, sustained already during the Spanish State on considering the possibility of a claim future of Statute, a Statute like that of 1979 remained subordinated to a Constitution on denying the inalienable national rights and imposing a Borbonic monarchy which was the heir of that of 1714 and of Francoist Spain.

=== Recent history ===
Estat Català has contested Spanish general elections, but it did not initially stand in the Catalan regional elections, in order to not reduce the vote of the other nationalist parties. In the Spanish general elections of 1979 it obtained 6,328 votes, which was 0.29% of the total. At the municipal level Estat Català uses the name Acció Municipal Democràtica has been presented repeatedly in the elections or in proper noun or lamb through its coalition.

Estat Català has contested several elections but has never attained a result better than 0.6% of the votes in Catalonia. At municipal level, through its municipal coalition of Acció Municipal Democràtica, it has achieved a variable number of town councilors depending on the electoral contest and also the government of some towns (45 town councilors in 1979, 9 town councilors and two mayor's offices in 2007, etc.).

In recent times, Estat Català contested the elections to the Parliament of Catalonia in 1999, obtaining 1,174 votes (0.06%). In the Spanish general elections of 2000, it obtained 2,321 votes for the Congress of Deputies (0.07%) and 17,825 in the Senate (0.53%); in the elections to the Parliament of Catalonia (2003) it obtained 1,890 votes (0.06%); and in the Elections to the European Parliament of 2004 it obtained 1,540 votes (0.07%). Since 2004, the party has not stood in elections except for local elections through the Acció Municipal Democràtica with which it obtained, in 2007, nine councillors who allowed it to sustain the government of two town councils.

Estat Català has supported different options in various elections, including the Republican Left of Catalonia and Catalan Solidarity for Independence.

== Bibliography ==
- 60 anys de premsa d'Estat Català. Estat Català. 1982.
- Callau, Tomàs; Miró, Jordi (2016). Marcel.lí Perelló. Una vida perseverant per la independència (in Catalan). Barcelona: Llibres de l'Índex. ISBN 97884945376-0-8.
- Callau, Tomàs; Rubiralta, Fermí (coord.) (2021). Diccionari Biogràfic d'Estat Català. Barcelona: Llibres de l'Index.
- Callau, Tomàs; Porta, Frederic; Santasusana, Marc; Rubiralta, Fermí (coord.) (2022). Estat Català (1922-2022). 100 anys d'independentisme polític. Barcelona: Base.
- Carner i Ribalta, Josep De Balaguer a Nova York passant per Moscou i Prats de Molló. París: Edicions Catalanes de París, 1972.
- Josep Carner i Ribalta. El Complot de Prats de Molló Barcelona. Dalmau editors, 1987.
- CATTINI; G. L'aixecament de Prats de Molló. Barcelona: Rosa dels Vents, 2021. ISBN 978-84-18033-65-0
- Crexell i Playà, Joan (1984). Origen de la bandera independentista. La Rella. Barcelona: El Llamp.
- CREXELL I PLAYÀ, Joan. El Complot de Garraf. Barcelona: Abadia de Montserrat, 1988.
- CREXELL I PLAYÀ, Joan (reed. Tomàs Callau i Fermí Rubiralta). El Complot de Garraf. Barcelona: Dalmau, 2025. ISBN 978-84-232-0913-2
- Joan Crexell i Playà. Origen de la bandera independentista. Barcelona: el Llamp, 1984.
- Dalmau i Vilella, Ferran (2023). Lliure i proletària!. Estat Català a les terres de Ponent i del Pirineu (1936-1939) (in Catalan). Lleida: Pagès Editors. ISBN 978-84-1303-453-9.
- Fontbernat i Verdaguer, Josep (2018). La Batalla de Prats de Molló. Barcelona: Base.
- Murià, Josep Maria (1985). Vivències d'un separatista. La Rella. Barcelona: El Llamp.
- Porta, F.; Rubiralta, F.; Villagrasa. Josep Dencàs i Puigdollers. El conceller maleït (1900-1966). Barcelona: Base, 2024. ISBN 978-84-10131-05-7
- PUIG GORDI, Lluís (coord.). Els fets de Prats de Molló, a: Primeres Jornades d'Història i Debat Nacional. Catarroja-Barcelona, 2023. València: Afers. ISBN 978-84-18-618-63-5
- RUBIRALTA, Fermí. Els origens de l' independentisme català a Cuba. Barcelona: Edicions del 1979, 2017. ISBN 978-84-943589-9-9
- RUBIRALTA, Fermí. La diàspora independentista a Amèrica. Barcelona: Edicions del 1979, 2023. ISBN 978-84-123255-7-7
- Rubiralta i Casas, Fermí (2018). Un conspirador independentista. Joaquim Juanola i Massó (1891-1967). Llibres de l'Index.
- Rubiralta i Casas, Fermí (2011). Miquel Badia. Vida i mort d'un líder separatista (in Catalan). Barcelona: Duxelm. ISBN 978-84-938414-2-3
- Rubiralta i Casas, Fermí (2004). Una història de l'independentisme polític català (in Catalan). Lleida: Pagès. ISBN 84-9779-137-1.
- Rubiralta i Casas, Fermí (2010). El Partit Nacionalista Català (1932-1936) (in Catalan). Barcelona: Dalmau. ISBN 978-84-232-0747-3.
- Rubiralta i Casas, Fermí. Estat Català sota el Franquisme (1939-1968). La lluita independentista contra el feixisme. Barcelona: Base, 2021.
- Santasusana, Marc (2015). De la fàbrica a la revolta. Trajectòria política de Pere Curtida i Ferrer, dirigent obrer sitgetà. Edicions 1979.
- Santasusana, Marc (2016). Quan la CNT cridà independència (in Catalan) (1st ed.). Barcelona: Base. ISBN 978-8416587179.
- Tous i Vallvé, Jordi (1999). Antoni Andreu i Abelló. Correspondència política de l'exili (1938-1939). D'Estat Català al Front Nacional de Catalunya. Edicions El Mèdol.
- Tubella i Casadevall, Imma (1979). Jaume Compte i el Partit Català Proletari. Alliberament; 8. Barcelona: La Magrana.
- Viladot i Presas, Albert (1987). Nacionalisme i premsa clandestina (1939-1951). Barcelona: Curial.
- Viladrosa, Octavi. Sang, dolor, esperança. Barcelona: Duxelm, 2010. ISBN 978-84-937740-9-7
