= BB14 =

BB14 may refer to:

- USS Nebraska (BB-14), a Virginia-class pre-dreadnought battleship of the United States Navy.
- Yellow 2291, a black bear also known as BB-14
- Any series of Big Brother 14
  - Big Brother 14 (U.S.), the 2012 edition of the United States version of Big Brother
  - Big Brother 14 (UK), the 2013 edition of the United Kingdom version of Big Brother
  - Bigg Boss (Hindi season 14), the 2020 version of Bigg Boss
  - Gran Hermano 14 (Spain), the 2013 edition of the Spanish version of Big Brother
