= Uno de GH20 =

- Presented by: Nagore Robles
- Country of origin: Spain
- Original language: Spanish

Production
- Production companies: Zeppelin TV; Mediaset España

Original release
- Network: Mediaset Infinity
- Release: 29 September – 5 November 2025

Related
- Gran Hermano 20; Gran Hermano; Big Brother

Uno de GH20 was a Spanish reality show produced by Zeppelin TV and broadcast on the online stream platform Mediaset Infinity. The show premiered on 29 September 2025 and it served as a final phase of the casting process of potential housemate for Gran Hermano 20.

The show was presented by Nagore Robles, the former housemate of Gran Hermano 11. The show involved the housemates living together while their activities were broadcast live 24 hours a day through two free feeds on Mediaset Infinity. In addition, the platform offered weekly main show "Galas" hosted by Nagore Robles, as well as daily summary episodes.

The show ended its live casting phase on 5 November 2025, but the identity of the winner was not officially announced until the premiere of Gran Hermano 20 the next day. Eventually, Cristian and Joon entered into a final showdown to compete, in the end, both of them to became official Housemate.

== Format ==
Uno de GH20 transforms the final casting process for the twentieth season of Gran Hermano into a reality show. This is the first time in Gran Hermano history, that the show has used this format to determine the official Housemates after 25 years and 32 seasons.

The candidates live in a house within the Mediaset España facility, called the Tiny House (La Casita), and their daily lives are broadcast live via two 24-hour live feeds on Mediaset Infinity, which viewers can watch for free. While living together, candidates participate in tasks and interactions designed to demonstrate their individual character, including working together to complete team challenges, working independently on personal decisions, developing strategies, and dealing with conflicts that arise in daily life.

Viewers play an important role in the casting process and can vote for their favorite candidates. Viewers join the casting team, led by Casting Director Teresa Colomina, in deciding which candidates make it to the house of Gran Hermano 20. The show also features Anabel Pantoja, Miguel Frigenti, Maica Benedicto, Manuel González and content creator Sergio Ojer, while arranging for previous Gran Hermano candidates to serve as "godparent" for some of the candidates and supporting them.

The show broadcasts two Galas every week, on Mondays and Wednesdays 21:00. In addition to the Gala, Mediaset Infinity also provides 24-hour live feeds and daily summaries of candidates, allowing viewers to continue to follow the progress of the casting results.

At the end of the casting phase, Cristian and Joon were the final two candidates. The winner was not immediately announced at the final Gala on 5 November 2025. Casting director Teresa Colomina handed over the final results to presenter Nagore Robles, who announced that the winner would be announced the next day during the premiere of Gran Hermano 20 on Telecinco. Teresa Colomina said the casting team ultimately chose the same person who the audience voted for.

== Candidates ==
On Day 1, the first eight candidates entered the house. Further candidates joined the competition over the following days, while others were evicted or left. On Day 8, the first candidate secured a place in the final of the casting. On Day 31, the eight finalists were confirmed as Cristian, Joon, Jana, Daniella, Gustavo, La Jose, Asier and Ruth. On Day 36, the four finalists were confirmed as Cristian Orvich, Daniella Talavera, Joon Choi and La Jose. On 6 November 2025, Joon was announced as the winner and became the official housemate of Gran Hermano 20.

Name	Age	Residence	Occupation	Day entered	Day exited	Status
Joon Choi	32	Las Palmas (originally from South Korea)	Restaurant Manager	1	38	Winner
Cristian Orvich	33	Madrid	Exhibitor	1	38	Runner-up
Daniella Talavera	19	Madrid	Sports Degree Student	8	38	Third place
José "La Jose" Márquez	24	Mallorca	DJ and student	1	38	Fourth place
Asier Aceras	23	Cáceres	Cook and waiter	22	36	Evicted
Ruth López	25	Valencia	Labor relations worker	22	36	Evicted
Ruth López	25	Valencia	Labor relations worker	1	1	Not selected
Jana Ausió	25	Barcelona	Biomedical student	1	36	Evicted
Gustavo Lust	30	Madrid (originally from Uruguay)	Singer	17	36	Evicted
Amparo Navarro	59	Valencia	Housewife	1	31	Evicted
Livia Martín	46	Salamanca	Receptionist	24	31	Evicted
Nora Tobe	36	Madrid (originally from Equatorial Guinea)	Unemployed	3	24	Evicted
Gloria Sánchez	33	Guadalajara	Stewardess	15	19	Walked
Daniel Aguado	30	Madrid	Model	10	17	Evicted
Anthony Voinot	34	Madrid (originally from France)	Customer Service	3	10	Evicted
Noa Sánchez	31	Madrid	Radio announcer	1	10	Ejected
Enrique Fresquet	25	Valencia	Real estate agent	1	3	Evicted
Marta Fraga	23	Madrid	Student	1	2	Walked
David Llórente	40	Madrid	Carrier and waiter	1	1	Not selected

== Results summary ==
On Thursday, November 6, 2025, at the premiere gala of Gran Hermano 20, it was announced that Joon Choi was the winner of Uno de GH20, in addition, Cristian Orvich would also be an official Housemate.

	Week 1			Week 2		Week 3		Week 4		Week 5			Final		
	Day 1	Day 2	Day 3	Day 8	Day 10	Day 15	Day 17	Day 22	Day 24	Day 29	Day 31		Day 36	Day 38	GH20 premiere
	Gala 1	Gala 2		Gala 3	Gala 4	Gala 5	Gala 6	Gala 7	Gala 8	Gala 9	Gala 10		Gala 11	Gala 12	GH20 premiere
Joon	Entered the house	Nominated	Saved	Nominated	Saved	Finalist						Nominated	Finalist		Winner (Official Housemate)
Cristian	Entered the house	Nominated	Saved	Finalist								Nominated	Finalist		Runner-up (Official Housemate)
Daniella	Not in House			Entered the house	Participating	Nominated	Saved	Finalist				Nominated	Finalist	Third place (Day 38)	
La Jose	Entered the house	Nominated	Saved	Nominated	Saved	Nominated	Saved	Nominated	Saved	Finalist	Finalist	Nominated	Finalist	Fourth place (Day 38)	
Asier	Not in House							Entered the house	Participating	Nominated	Finalist	Nominated	Evicted (Day 36)		
Ruth	Potential; Candidate	Not selected (Day 1)						Entered the house	Participating	Nominated	Finalist	Nominated	Evicted (Day 36)		
Jana	Entered the house	Nominated	Saved	Nominated	Saved	Finalist						Nominated	Evicted (Day 36)		
Gustavo	Not in House						Entered the house	Finalist				Nominated	Evicted (Day 36)		
Amparo	Entered the house	Nominated	Saved	Nominated	Saved	Immune	Saved	Immune	Saved	Nominated	Evicted (Day 31)				
Livia	Not in House								Entered the house	Nominated	Evicted (Day 31)				
Nora	Not in House	Entered the house	Participating	Immune	Saved	Nominated	Saved	Nominated	Evicted (Day 24)						
Gloria	Not in House					Entered the house	Participating	Walked (Day 19)							
Daniel	Not in House				Entered the house	Nominated	Evicted (Day 17)								
Anthony	Not in House	Entered the house	Participating	Nominated	Evicted (Day 10)										
Noa	Entered the house	Participating	Participating	Participating	Ejected (Day 10)										
Enrique	Entered the house	Nominated	Evicted (Day 3)												
Marta	Entered the house	Walked (Day 2)													
David	Potential; Candidate	Not selected (Day 1)													
Notes	1			2		3		4		5		6		7	
Walked		Marta						Gloria							
Removed					Noa										
Evicted	David; Not selected by Teresa Colomina	Enrique; Fewest votes to save		Anthony; Fewest votes to save		Daniel; Fewest votes to save		Nora; Fewest votes to save		Livia; 39% to save		Gustavo; Fewest votes to save		La Jose; Fewest votes (out of 4) to win	Cristian; Fewest votes to win
Evicted	David; Not selected by Teresa Colomina	Enrique; Fewest votes to save		Anthony; Fewest votes to save		Daniel; Fewest votes to save		Nora; Fewest votes to save		Livia; 39% to save		Jana; Fewest votes to save		La Jose; Fewest votes (out of 4) to win	Cristian; Fewest votes to win
Evicted	Ruth; Not selected by Teresa Colomina	Enrique; Fewest votes to save		Anthony; Fewest votes to save		Daniel; Fewest votes to save		Nora; Fewest votes to save		Amparo; 40% to save		Ruth; Fewest votes to save		Daniella; Fewest votes (out of 4) to win	Joon; Most votes to win
Evicted	Ruth; Not selected by Teresa Colomina	Enrique; Fewest votes to save		Anthony; Fewest votes to save		Daniel; Fewest votes to save		Nora; Fewest votes to save		Amparo; 40% to save		Asier; Fewest votes to save		Daniella; Fewest votes (out of 4) to win	Joon; Most votes to win

Notes

- ^Note 1: On Day 1 (29 September, Gala 1): The casting phase officially starts, and the selected candidates enter the Tiny House (La Casita) and start a 24-hour live broadcast together. During the first gala, casting director Teresa Colomina gives candidates her approval or rejection. David Llórente and Ruth López are among those who are not selected, while the decision on three candidates is left pending until the end of the gala, when Joon Choi is announced as the final candidate selected to continue in the audition process. On Day 2 (30 September), Marta Fraga voluntarily withdraws after her first night at the Tiny House, for the reason of emotional difficulty of the experience. Leaving a spot to be filled at the following Gala. On Day 3 (1 October, Gala 2), two new candidates, Nora Tobe and Anthony Voinot, enter the Tiny House. The public vote between Amparo and Enrique to decide who remains in the casting. Amparo is saved, and Enrique becomes the first to leave the casting process.
- ^Note 2: On Day 8 (6 October, Gala 3): Maica Benedicto, a former Housemate of Gran Hermano 19, visits the Tiny House and becomes the first Godmother of the casting process. She chose Nora to gain immunity from eviction. At the same Gala, the public voted for Cristian as the first finalist. One new candidate, Daniella Talavera, entered the Tiny House, she also participated in a group emotional exchange and answered questions submitted by the public. On Day 9 (7 October): Candidates were divided into teams of two and tasked with caring for eggs to demonstrate responsibility. Maica continues to be a guest at the Tiny House and plays "two lies and a truth" with the candidates: each person makes three statements and the others have to find the truth in them. Maica selects the most telling truths and the most brilliant lies. Óscar Landa also visited the cabin and gave advice to the candidates. He comforted the depressed Amparo Navarro, and also persuaded Noa, who wanted to withdraw from the casting due to the criticism he received after the last Gala, to hold on for a while longer. On Day 10 (8 October): Candidates vote for the person they most want to leave the Tiny House. As eviction approaches, tensions rise between the candidates, especially Jana and Anthony, who faced public eviction voting. On Day 11 (9 October, Gala 4): The casting team has decided not to allow Noa Sánchez to continue casting due to repeated instances of disrespectful behavior, including name calling and dismissive gestures. Daniel Aguado enters the Tuny House as a new candidate. In a separate public vote, Jana was saved and Anthony Voinot was evicted.
- ^Note 3: Day 15 (October 13, Gala 5): Former Gran Hermano 19 Housemate Ruvens Pérez arrives as Godfather and selects Amparo for immunity. The viewers voted for Joon as the second finalist. And Teresa Colomina, the casting director, has chosen Jana as the third finalist. Gloria Sánchez enters the Tiny House as a new candidate. On Day 16 (14 October): Gloria expresses dissatisfaction with the conditions at the Tiny House. Daniella is depressed over comments made about her at a previous Gala and considers quitting. Daniel is having an emotional breakdown over criticism of him. On Day 17 (15 October): Candidates participate in new garden tasks. As eviction approaches, some people are becoming anxious, and Daniel and Daniella are feuding over the possibility of leaving. On Day 17 (October 15, Gala 6): Violeta Crespo and Edi Insua visit the Tiny House. Previous housemates asked the candidates questions on the spot. Daniel was evicted. New candidate Gustavo Lust entered the Tiny House.
- ^Note 4: On Day 22 (20 October, Gala 7): Gloria voluntarily withdrew from casting. Ruth López (daughter of Amparo), who was not initially selected for the casting process, and Asier Aceras entered the Tiny House and became new candidates. The viewers voted for Daniella to advance to the final, and casting director Teresa Colomina selected Gustavo to advance. Violeta Crespo and Edi Insua from Gran Hermano 19 serve as Godparents of the week, Granted immunity to Amparo. On Day 24 (22 October, Gala 8): Nora lost the public vote with La Jose and was evicted from casting. Livia Martín entered the Tiny House, becoming the last candidate to casting process. Beatriz Retamal from Gran Hermano 17 serves as the new Godmother, having the privilege of arranging two eviction duels: Ruth against her mother Amparo, and Asier against Livia.
- ^Note 5: On Day 29 (27 October, Gala 9): The viewers voted for La Jose as the seventh finalist. The two duels arranged by Beatriz at Gala 8 are still in progress and the results have not yet been decided. On Day 31 (29 October, Gala 10): Asier received 61% of the audience votes in a duel with Livia, therefore, advancing to the final, and Livia was evicted. Ruth then became the eighth finalist after receiving 60% of the public vote in a duel with her mother Amparo, who was evicted. At this point, all eight finalists are confirmed: Cristian, Joon, Jana, Daniella, Gustavo, La Jose, Asier and Ruth.
- ^Note 6: On Day 36 (3 November, Gala 11): In the public voting showdown in the semi-finals, La Jose defeated Gustavo, Cristian defeated Jana, Joon defeated Ruth, and Daniella defeated Asier, with the four losers evicted from casting. Cristian, Joon, Daniella and La Jose advance to the final.
- ^Note 7: On Day 37 (4 November): The four finalists remain at the Tiny House to prepare for the final Gala. On Day 38 (5 November, Gala 12): The four finalists compete for a spot in Gran Hermano 20. In the end, only Cristian and Joon were left, but instead of announcing the sole winner that night, the show postponed the results until the next day on the premiere of Gran Hermano 20. On 6 November, the premiere of Gran Hermano 20, Joon Choi was announced as the winner of Uno de GH20 and became an official Housemate of Gran Hermano 20. At the same time, Cristian was also allowed to become an official Housemate.

== Godfathers and godmothers ==
The show invites Housemates from past seasons of "Gran Hermano" to serve as padrinos y madrinas (godfathers or godmothers) to the candidates. They go into the Tiny House where the candidate lives, spend time with the candidate and get to know them, and then get the opportunity to provide the candidate with special treatment based on that week's assignment. Treatments include immunity from eviction or arranging candidates to compete in one-on-one eviction duels.

Week	From season...	Name	Candidate(s)	Privilege
1	Gran Hermano 19	Maica Benedicto	Nora	Immunity
2	Gran Hermano 19	Ruvens Pérez	Amparo	Immunity
3	Gran Hermano 19	Violeta Crespo & Edi Insua	Amparo	Immunity
4	Gran Hermano 17	Beatriz Retamal	Ruth & Amparo, Asier & Livia	Sending off to eviction duels
5	Gran Hermano 19	Óscar Landa & Maica Benedicto	none	
