= Gran Hermano (Spanish TV series) =

Spanish television series

- Based on: Big Brother by John de Mol Jr.
- Directed by: Jaime Guerra; Álvaro Díaz; Juan Salgueiro; Pilar Blasco; María Zambrano
- Presented by: Jorge Javier Vázquez; Mercedes Milá; Jordi González; Pepe Navarro
- Country of origin: Spain
- Original language: Spanish
- No. of seasons: 32

Production
- Running time: 210 minutes (approx.)
- Production companies: Zeppelin TV; Mediaset España

Original release
- Network: Telecinco
- Release: 23 April 2000 – present

Related
- Gran Hermano VIP; Gran Hermano Dúo; El Reencuentro

Gran Hermano (also known by the acronym GH) is the Spanish version of the Big Brother franchise.

Produced by Zeppelin TV (part of the Endemol Shine Iberia) and broadcast on Telecinco, Gran Hermano has been the first reality show to be broadcast in Spain, as well as an audience leader: it obtained a 36.5% rating share in its premiere, became an instant success and reached over ten million in its first two seasons.

Due to the low audience of the eighteenth season, Telecinco decided to shelve the regular edition and continue to produce Gran Hermano VIP and the spin-off Gran Hermano Dúo. In 2024, the regular edition returned after a seven-year break.

As of February 2020, 30 seasons of the show had aired (eighteen regular seasons, seven VIP seasons, and five spin-off seasons); it is the longest-running series in the franchise worldwide, currently on air.

== Format ==
Based on the original Dutch version created by John de Mol Jr., the show sees several different housemates, divided by gender, social backgrounds and geographical locations locked up together in a house, where the viewing public can watch them twenty-four hours a day, and vote them out of the house as they choose to. The housemates live in isolation from the outside world in a house custom built with everyday objects, like home appliances and a garden. The house also includes cameras and microphones in most of the rooms recording all of the activities on the premises. The only place where housemates can be away from the other contestants is in the confession room, where they can express their true feelings. The winner is the last contestant remaining in the house and receives a cash prize. Housemates are evicted weekly throughout the show by the viewing public.

The show's name comes from George Orwell's novel Nineteen Eighty-Four from Big Brother is the all-seeing, omnipotent leader of Oceania.

The galas (eviction & nomination show) broadcast on Thursdays, presented by Mercedes Milá from 2000 to 2001 and 2002 to 2015. Jorge Javier Vázquez replaced Mercedes Milá from 2016. The weekly debate show is presented by Jordi González on Sundays and the highlights show from the previous day being shown daily. Límte 48 horas on Tuesdays and Última Hora is presented by Jordi González on the set and Lara Álvarez from the editorial office on Mondays.

Following the success of the format, Telecinco developed different versions of the format. In 2004, Gran Hermano VIP aired, is the version with celebrity housemates, which have aired seven seasons.

In 2010, El Reencuentro premiered, which aired two seasons, the first season is with pairs of Gran Hermano housemates who entered the house again to sort out unfinished matters, and the second season is with contestants from different reality shows of Telecinco.

In 2019, Gran Hermano Dúo aired, it's a variant of the celebrity format which the housemates entered the house with a current or former relationship and coupled-up.

This classic Gran Hermano logo was used from 2000 to 2009 (Seasons 1 to 11).

== Series overview ==
=== Regular seasons ===
| Seasons | Launch date | Finale date | Days | Housemates | Winner | The Grand Prize | Average viewers (millions) |
|---|---|---|---|---|---|---|---|
| Gran Hermano 1 | 23 April 2000 | 21 July 2000 | 90 | 14 | Ismael Beiro | 20,000,000 Pts (Equivalent to €120,202) | 7.81 |
| Gran Hermano 2 | 18 March 2001 | 27 June 2001 | 102 | 13 | Sabrina Mahí | 50,000,000 Pts (Equivalent to €300,505) | 6.70 |
| Gran Hermano 3 | 4 April 2002 | 14 July 2002 | 102 | 13 | Javito García | €300,000 | 5.16 |
| Gran Hermano 4 | 6 October 2002 | 16 January 2003 | 103 | 13 | Pedro Oliva | €300,000 | 4.67 |
| Gran Hermano 5 | 21 September 2003 | 11 January 2004 | 113 | 13 | Nuria Yáñez | €300,000 | 4.27 |
| Gran Hermano 6 | 5 September 2004 | 23 December 2004 | 110 | 16 | Juanjo Mateo | €300,000 | 4.61 |
| Gran Hermano 7 | 20 October 2005 | 5 February 2006 | 109 | 14 | Pepe Herrero | €300,000 | 4.16 |
| Gran Hermano 8 | 7 September 2006 | 21 December 2006 | 106 | 14 | Naiala Melo | €300,000 | 3.40 |
| Gran Hermano 9 | 9 September 2007 | 27 December 2007 | 110 | 18 | Judit Iglesias | €300,000 | 3.51 |
| Gran Hermano 10 | 21 September 2008 | 22 January 2009 | 124 | 18 | Iván Madrazo | €300,000 | 3.78 |
| Gran Hermano 11 | 6 September 2009 | 27 January 2010 | 144 | 20 | Ángel Muñoz | €350,000 | 3.46 |
| Gran Hermano 12 | 17 October 2010 | 10 March 2011 | 145 | 22 | Laura Campos | €300,000 | 2.63 |
| Gran Hermano 12+1 | 19 January 2012 | 28 May 2012 | 131 | 21 | Pepe Flores | €300,000 | 2.97 |
| Gran Hermano Catorce | 11 February 2013 | 18 June 2013 | 128 | 25 | Susana Molina | €300,000 | 2.57 |
| Gran Hermano 15 | 18 September 2014 | 18 December 2014 | 92 | 18 | Paula González | €300,000 | 2.71 |
| Gran Hermano 16 | 13 September 2015 | 23 December 2015 | 102 | 17 | Sofía Suescun | €300,000 | 2.84 |
| Gran Hermano 17 | 8 September 2016 | 22 December 2016 | 106 | 19 | Beatriz Retamal | €300,000 | 2.19 |
| Gran Hermano Revolution | 19 September 2017 | 14 December 2017 | 89 | 21 | Hugo Sierra | €300,000 | 1.48 |
| Gran Hermano 19 | 5 September 2024 | 19 December 2024 | 106 | 19 | Juan Luis Quintana | €150,000 (Note: Reduced from €300,000) | 0.98 |
| Gran Hermano 20 | 6 November 2025 | 18 December 2025 | 42 | 20 | Rocio Gallardo | €300,000 | 0.65 |

=== Celebrity seasons ===
| Seasons | Launch date | Finale date | Days | Housemates | Winner | The Grand Prize | Average viewers (millions) |
|---|---|---|---|---|---|---|---|
| Gran Hermano VIP: El Desafío | 22 January 2004 | 30 March 2004 | 69 | 12 | Marlène Mourreau | €60,000 | 4.29 |
| Gran Hermano VIP 2 | 6 January 2005 | 17 March 2005 | 71 | 13 | Ivonne Armant | €60,000 | 3.97 |
| Gran Hermano VIP 3 | 11 January 2015 | 26 March 2015 | 75 | 15 | Belén Esteban | €100,000 | 3.99 |
| Gran Hermano VIP 4 | 7 January 2016 | 14 April 2016 | 99 | 18 | Laura Matamoros | €100,000 | 2.94 |
| Gran Hermano VIP 5 | 8 January 2017 | 13 April 2017 | 96 | 15 | Alyson Eckmann | €100,000 | 2.09 |
| Gran Hermano VIP 6 | 13 September 2018 | 20 December 2018 | 99 | 16 | Miriam Saavedra | €100,000 | 3.12 |
| Gran Hermano VIP 7 | 11 September 2019 | 19 December 2019 | 100 | 16 | Adara Molinero | €100,000 | 3.26 |
| Gran Hermano VIP 8 | 14 September 2023 | 21 December 2023 | 99 | 19 | Naomi Asensi | €70,600 (Note: Reduced from €150,000) | 0.96 |
| Gran Hermano VIP 9 | 18 November 2026 | 2027 | TBA | 15 | TBA | €100,000 | TBA |

=== All Stars seasons ===
| Seasons | Launch date | Finale date | Days | Housemates | Winner | The Grand Prize | Average viewers (millions) |
|---|---|---|---|---|---|---|---|
| Gran Hermano: El Reencuentro | 3 February 2010 | 30 March 2010 | 56 | 28 | Pepe Herrero & Raquel López | €60,000 | 2.98 |
| El Reencuentro: 10 Años Después (Note: El Reencuentro 2011 is still counted as one of the GH series by Mediaset España and the production company Zeppelin, see two sources.) | 17 March 2011 | 2 May 2011 | 47 | 23 | Juan Miguel Martínez & Yola Berrocal | €30,000 | 2.07 |

=== Gran Hermano Dúo seasons ===
| Seasons | Launch date | Finale date | Days | Housemate | Winner | The Grand Prize | Average viewers (millions) |
|---|---|---|---|---|---|---|---|
| Gran Hermano Dúo 1 | 8 January 2019 | 11 April 2019 | 94 | 16 | María Jesús Ruiz | €100,000 | 2.84 |
| Gran Hermano Dúo 2 | 11 January 2024 | 3 March 2024 | 53 | 13 | Lucía Sánchez | €50,000 | 1.00 |
| Gran Hermano Dúo 3 | 2 January 2025 | 4 March 2025 | 62 | 15 | Marieta Sola | €50,000 | 0.88 |
| Gran Hermano Dúo 4 | 8 January 2026 | 3 March 2026 | 55 | 15 | Carlos Lozano | €50,000 | 0.84 |

=== Spin-off seasons ===
| Seasons | Launch date | Finale date | Days | Housemates | Winner | The Grand Prize | Average viewers (millions) |
|---|---|---|---|---|---|---|---|
| Gran Hermano: La Re-vuelta | 30 May 2012 | 13 June 2012 | 15 | 16 | Alessandro Livi | €20,000 | 2.47 |
| El Tiempo del Descuento | 12 January 2020 | 16 February 2020 | 36 | 12 | Gianmarco Onestini | €30,000 | 2.19 |
| Uno de GH20 | 29 September 2025 | 5 November 2025 | 38 | 17 | Joon Choi | Won a place in Gran Hermano 20 | —N/a |

== Presenters and programmes ==
| Season | Year | Galas Nominations & Evictions | Daily highlights | Debates | Última hora | Límite | | Evicted housemates interview |
| Season | Year | Galas Nominations & Evictions | Daily highlights | Debates | Última hora | Límite 48 horas | Límite 24 horas | Evicted housemates interview |
|---|---|---|---|---|---|---|---|---|
| Gran Hermano 1 | 2000 | Mercedes Milá | Fernando Acaso | | | | | Fernando Acaso |
| Gran Hermano 2 | 2001 | Mercedes Milá | Fernando Acaso | | | | | Fernando Acaso |
| Gran Hermano 3 | 2002 | Pepe Navarro | Paula Vázquez | | | | | Paula Vázquez |
| Gran Hermano 4 | 2002–2003 | Mercedes Milá | Jorge Fernández | Jesús Vázquez | | | | Jorge Fernández |
| Gran Hermano 5 | 2003 – 2004 | Mercedes Milá | Carolina Ferre | Jesús Vázquez | | | | Jorge Fernández |
| Gran Hermano VIP: El Desafío | 2004 | Jesús Vázquez | Jorge Fernández | Carolina Ferre | | | | |
| Gran Hermano 6 | 2004 | Mercedes Milá | Óscar Martínez | Jordi González | | | | |
| Gran Hermano VIP 2 | 2005 | Jesús Vázquez | Óscar Martínez | Jordi González | | | | |
| Gran Hermano 7 | 2005 - 2006 | Mercedes Milá | | Jordi González | | | | |
| Gran Hermano 8 | 2006 | Mercedes Milá | Lucía Riaño | Jordi González | | | | |
| Gran Hermano 9 | 2007 | Mercedes Milá | Óscar Martínez | Jordi González | | | | |
| Gran Hermano 10 | 2008 - 2009 | Mercedes Milá | Jorge Javier Vázquez | | | | | |
| Gran Hermano 11 | 2009 - 2010 | Mercedes Milá | | Jordi González | | | | |
| Gran Hermano: El Reencuentro | 2010 | Mercedes Milá | | Jordi González | | | | |
| Gran Hermano 12 | 2010 - 2011 | Mercedes Milá | Lorena Castell | Jordi González; Lorena Castell | | | | |
| Gran Hermano 12+1 | 2012 | Mercedes Milá | Jordi González | | | | | |
| Gran Hermano 12+1: La Re-vuelta | 2012 | Mercedes Milá | Jordi González | | | | | |
| Gran Hermano 14 | 2013 | Mercedes Milá | Frank Blanco | | | | | |
| Gran Hermano 15 | 2014 | Mercedes Milá | Jordi González | | | | | |
| Gran Hermano VIP 3 | 2015 | Jordi González | Jordi González | Raquel Sánchez Silva | | | | |
| Gran Hermano 16 | 2015 | Mercedes Milá | Jordi González | | Jordi González; Lara Álvarez | | | |
| Gran Hermano VIP 4 | 2016 | Jordi González | Sandra Barneda | | Jordi González | | | |
| Gran Hermano 17 | 2016 | Jorge Javier Vázquez | Lara Álvarez | | Jordi González | | | Jordi González; Lara Álvarez |
| Gran Hermano VIP 5 | 2017 | Jordi González | | Sandra Barneda | Lara Álvarez | | | Jordi González |
| Gran Hermano Revolution | 2017 | Jorge Javier Vázquez | | Jordi González | Sandra Barneda | | | |
| Gran Hermano VIP 6 | 2018 | Jorge Javier Vázquez | | Sandra Barneda | Lara Álvarez | | | |
| Gran Hermano Dúo 1 | 2019 | Jorge Javier Vázquez (Gala 1–11); Jordi González (Gala 12-Final) | | Jordi González | | Jorge Javier Vázquez | Jordi González | |
| Gran Hermano VIP 7 | 2019 | Jorge Javier Vázquez (Gala 1–13, Final); Jordi González (Gala 14–15) | Lara Álvarez | Jordi González | Lara Álvarez | Jorge Javier Vázquez (show 1–11) | Carlos Sobera (show 12-Final) | |
| El Tiempo del Descuento | 2020 | Jorge Javier Vázquez (Gala); Núria Marín (Más) | | | | | | |
| Gran Hermano VIP 8 | 2023 | Marta Flich | | Ion Aramendi | Lara Álvarez | Marta Flich | | |
| Gran Hermano Dúo 2 | 2024 | Marta Flich | | Ion Aramendi | Lara Álvarez | Marta Flich | | |
| Gran Hermano 2024 | 2024 | Jorge Javier Vázquez | | Ion Aramendi | Laura Madrueño Frank Blanco | Jorge Javier Vázquez | | |
| Gran Hermano Dúo 3 | 2025 | Carlos Sobera | | Ion Aramendi | Ion Aramendi | | | |
| Uno de GH20 | 2025 | Nagore Robles | | | | | | |
| Gran Hermano 20 | 2025 | Jorge Javier Vázquez; Nagore Robles (Gala 1) | | Ion Aramendi | | | | |
| Gran Hermano Dúo 4 | 2026 | Jorge Javier Vázquez | | Ion Aramendi | | Jorge Javier Vázquez | | |
| Gran Hermano VIP 9 | 2026-2027 | Jorge Javier Vázquez | | Ion Aramendi | | | | |

Current presenters

- Jorge Javier Vázquez - presented the daily highlights and the weekly debate show for Gran Hermano 10 and the main gala shows for Gran Hermano 17–20, Gran Hermano VIP 6–7, 9, Gran Hermano Dúo 1, and Gran Hermano Dúo 4
- Ion Aramendi - presents the weekly debate show for Gran Hermano VIP 8, Gran Hermano Dúo 2–4, and Gran Hermano 19-20

Former presenters

- Mercedes Milá - presents the main gala shows for Gran Hermano 1–2, 4–16
- Pepe Navarro - presented the main gala shows for Gran Hermano 3
- Paula Vázquez - presented the daily highlights and the housemates exit for Gran Hermano 3
- Fernando Acaso - presented the daily highlights and the housemates exit for the first two series.
- Jesús Vázquez - presented the weekly debate show for Gran Hermano 4 and 5
- Jorge Fernández - presented the daily highlights for Gran Hermano 4 and the housemates exit in Gran Hermano 5
- Carolina Ferre - presented the daily highlights for Gran Hermano 5
- Óscar Martínez - presented the daily highlights for Gran Hermano 6 and 9
- Lucía Riaño - presented the daily highlights for Gran Hermano 8
- Lorena Castell - presented the daily highlights for Gran Hermano 12
- Frank Blanco - presented the weekly debate show for Gran Hermano 14
- Jordi González - presented the weekly debate show for Gran Hermano 6–9, 11–13, 15–18, Gran Hermano Dúo, and the main gala shows for Gran Hermano VIP 3–5.
- Marta Flich - presents the main gala shows and límite 48 horas show for Gran Hermano VIP 8 and Gran Hermano Dúo 2
- Carlos Sobera - presents the main gala shows for Gran Hermano Dúo 3.
- Nagore Robles – presented Uno de GH20, and Gran Hermano 20 launch.
