= Gran Hermano (Spanish TV series) season 20 =

Gran Hermano
- Season 20
- Presented by: Jorge Javier Vazquez
- No. of days: 43
- No. of housemates: 20
- Winner: Rocío Gallardo
- Runner-up: Cristian Orvich
- Companion show: GH. La Vida en Directo
- No. of episodes: 7 (Galas)

Release
- Original network: Telecinco
- Original release: November 6 – December 18, 2025

Season chronology
- ← Previous; Season 19; Uno de GH20

Gran Hermano 20 is the twentieth season of the Spanish version of the reality television series franchise Big Brother. The show produced by Zeppelin TV and premiered on 6 November 2025 on Telecinco.

Before the official start of Gran Hermano 20, the casting show Uno de GH20 premiered exclusively on Mediaset Infinity on 29 September 2025 and hosted by Nagore Robles. The show in which candidates competed for places in the main Gran Hermano season. The viewers voted for their favourite candidate, while casting director Teresa Colomina also selected candidates to advance. In the end, Joon Choi and Cristian Orvich became the two finalists. During the premiere gala of Gran Hermano 20, it was announced that Joon Choi won the final, but both of them had qualified as official housemates of Gran Hermano 20.

The season concluded on 18 December 2025, when Rocío Gallardo was announced as the winner, receiving the €300,000 prize. The season lasted 42 days, making it the shortest regular version of the Spanish series at the time.

The season introduced a new house, located in Tres Cantos, replacing the show's previous location in Guadalix de la Sierra. Jorge Javier Vázquez as the main presenter for Galas and Ion Aramendi continued to host Gran Hermano: El debate. A new daily spin-off, GH. La Vida en Directo, presented by Jorge Javier Vázquez and Nagore Robles, aired on Telecinco from 10 to 13 November 2025, featuring live connections to the house and updates on the housemates' daily lives. However, it was canceled after just 4 episodes.

== Early conclusion ==
The show was initially scheduled to run until February 2026, but faced irreversible audience losses, causing a historic ratings collapse. Not only did it lag far behind its competitors during prime time, but it was even surpassed by some second-tier documentary programs (such as "Horizonte"). Mediaset España decided to rush the show before Christmas. In the end, this season was only broadcast for 42 days, becoming the shortest season in the series' 25-year history of the Spanish version of "Gran Hermano".

The decision comes amid weeks of declining ratings for the show. As one of Telecinco's main reality shows, Gran Hermano was originally expected to provide the channel with stable prime time ratings and serve as a bridge to reality show programming from late 2025 to the spring 2026. However, this season failed to live up to that expectation, prompting producers to condense the competition and move the final to just before Christmas.

=== Ratings drop ===
The show was delayed until November, compared to the show's usual September premiere. Spanish media pointed out that the later start time puts the program into a broadcast schedule that is already occupied by other reality shows, and "La Isla de las Tentaciones 9" was also broadcast at a similar time. Both shows occupy multiple evening time slots of Telecinco every week, which may intensify audience diversion.

The season premiere attracted approximately 889,000 viewers and a market share of 15.8%, but ratings have continued to decline since then. The main live show on 27 November only attracted about 600,000 viewers, with a market share of 11%; the semi-finals on 11 December further dropped to about 510,000 viewers and 8.8%. The average market share of the seven main live shows is approximately 11.3%, which is lower than the overall performance of the previous season.

The show's poor performance also comes against the backdrop of overall ratings pressure on Telecinco. Shortly after the show was launched, Telecinco tried to launch a 24-hour spin-off reality show, "GH. La Vida en Directo". However, the network canceled it in a "catastrophic" manner after it drew extremely low ratings of 5.5% in just 4 days.

On 4 December 2025, the host Jorge Javier Vázquez announced that the season would end before Christmas. The production team then accelerated the eviction process and held the finale on 18 December.

=== Subsequent scheduling ===
Before the finale of Gran Hermano 20 was held, Spanish media reported that Telecinco was considering launching another cohabitation reality show with celebrities as contestants immediately after the end of this season to maintain the original program schedule to be broadcast in conjunction with "Supervivientes" in the spring. Reports mentioned that the project might take a Gran Hermano VIP-esque format and use the title El reencuentro, but the producers had not officially confirmed these arrangements at the time.

In the end, Telecinco chose to take over with the fourth season of "Gran Hermano Dúo" and it premiered on 8 January 2026, just three weeks after "Gran Hermano 20" ended on 18 December 2025, continuing the "Gran Hermano" brand on the channel.

== Housemates ==
Twenty housemates began the season, with Íñigo and Edurne initially granted immunity in the Birdcage (Pajarera), while Cristian, Rocío, Noah and later Sofía were placed in the secret Oasis; after Aroa joined them following her apparent eviction, the five Oasis housemates competed for three places in the main house, which went to Aroa, Cristian and Rocío, while Noah and Sofía were evicted.

| Name | Age | Residence | Occupation | Day entered | Day exited | Status |
|---|---|---|---|---|---|---|
| Rocío Gallardo Ramos | 30 | Cádiz | Hairdresser | 1 | 43 | Winner |
| Cristian Orvich | 34 | Madrid | Exhibitor | 1 | 43 | Runner-up |
| Aquilino Jiménez Utrera | 31 | Alicante | Social Worker | 1 | 43 | Third Place |
| Raúl Martínez Martínez | 30 | Soria | Poker player and investor | 1 | 43 | Fourth Place |
| Desirée Torrecilla Ruiz | 31 | Cádiz | Hairdresser | 1 | 39 | Evicted |
| Edurne González García | 29 | Barcelona | Clothing Store Manager | 1 | 36 | Evicted |
| Jonay Santana | 32 | Las Palmas | Floor manager | 1 | 36 | Evicted |
| Aroa Carvajal | 22 | Málaga | Commercial Advisor | 1 | 36 | Evicted |
| Joon Choi | 32 | Las Palmas (originally from South Korea) | Restaurant Manager | 1 | 36 | Evicted |
| Patricia Gawron | 34 | Valencia | Image consultant | 1 | 36 | Evicted |
| Belén Montes | 41 | Pontevedra | Curvy model and entrepreneur | 1 | 32 | Evicted |
| Paula Payá | 27 | Alicante | Nurse | 1 | 29 | Evicted |
| Mamadou Sacko | 22 | Barcelona | Commercial Administrative | 1 | 29 | Evicted |
| José Manuel Cruz Maqueda | 24 | Sevilla | Entrepreneur and model | 1 | 29 | Evicted |
| Íñigo Tina | 32 | Álava | Engineer | 1 | 27 | Walked |
| Almudena Espinosa | 37 | Ciudad Real | Civil guard candidate | 1 | 22 | Evicted |
| Lorena Rodríguez | 23 | Ciudad Real | Fashion Student | 1 | 18 | Evicted |
| Diego Blázquez Escobar | 34 | Madrid | Military personnel | 1 | 15 | Evicted |
| Sofía Auñón (Note: Noah Diaz and Sofía Auñón are girlfriends.) | 26 | Valencia | Financial influencer | 1 | 11 | Evicted |
| Noah Díaz | 22 | Valencia | Motivational coach | 1 | 11 | Evicted |
| Marcos Blázquez | 49 | Madrid | High school teacher, lawyer and cattle rancher | Refused to enter (Note: Marcos Blázquez refused to enter the house after learning that his brother Diego Blázquez had also been selected as a housemate, citing their ongoing family conflict.) | | |

== Nominations table ==
| | Week 1 | Week 2 | | Week 3 | | | Week 4 | | | Week 5 | | | | | | Week 6 | | |
| | Week 1 | Day 8 | Day 11 | Day 15 | Day 18 | Day 22 | | Day 29 | | | Day 32 | Day 36 | | | | | Final | |
| | Week 1 | Day 8 | Day 11 | Day 15 | Day 18 | Day 22 | | Positive vote | House vote | Positive vote | Day 32 | #1 | #2 | #3 | #4 | Vote to win | Final | |
|---|---|---|---|---|---|---|---|---|---|---|---|---|---|---|---|---|---|---|
| Rocío | In Oasis | | In Oasis | No; Nominations | 3-Almudena; 2-Patricia; 1-Aroa | ~~3-Aroa~~; 2-Belén; 1-Raúl | | No; Nominations | Paula | No; Nominations | 3-Patricia; 2-Jonay; 1-Aroa | Not; Eligible | Aroa | Desirée | Not; Eligible | No; Nominations | Winner (Day 43) | |
| Cristian | In Oasis | | In Oasis | Nominated | 3-Almudena; 2-Aroa; 1-Raúl | Banned | | No; Nominations | Paula | No; Nominations | 3-Raúl; 2-Aroa; 1-Jonay | Not; Eligible | Not; Eligible | Not; Eligible | Not; Eligible | No; Nominations | Runner-Up (Day 43) | |
| Aquilino | No; Nominations | 3-Joon; 2-Diego; 1-Jonay | | Nominated | 3-Jonay; 2-Patricia; 1-Joon | Banned | | No; Nominations | Joon | No; Nominations | 3-Patricia; 3-Jonay; 1-Joon | Not; Eligible | Not; Eligible | Not; Eligible | Edurne | No; Nominations | Third Place (Day 43) | |
| Raúl | No; Nominations | 3-Diego; 2-Jonay; 1-Almudena | | Nominated | 3-Cristian; 2-Joon; 1-Patricia | Patricia | | No; Nominations | Joon | No; Nominations | 3-Cristian; 2-Joon; 1-Patricia | Joon | Rocío | Not; Eligible | Not; Eligible | No; Nominations | Fourth Place (Day 43) | |
| Desirée | No; Nominations | 3-José Manuel; 2-Diego; 1-Almudena | | Nominated | 3-Patricia; 2-Almudena; 1-Belén | 3-Belén; 2-Raúl; ~~1-Íñigo~~ | | No; Nominations | Paula | No; Nominations | 3-Jonay; 2-Patricia; 1-Raúl | Not; Eligible | Not; Eligible | Jonay | Aquilino | No; Nominations | Evicted (Day 39) | |
| Edurne | In Aviary; Exempt | 3-Belén; 2-Mamadou; 1-Aquilino | | Exempt | 3-Patricia; 2-Paula; 1-Aquilino | Not; Eligible | | No; Nominations | Paula | No; Nominations | 4-Aquilino; 3-Cristian; 1-Aroa | Not; Eligible | Not; Eligible | Not; Eligible | Not; Eligible | Evicted (Day 36) | | |
| Jonay | No; Nominations | 3-Mamadou; 2-Raúl; 1-Belén | | Exempt | 3-Paula; 2-Aquilino; 1-Mamadou | 3-Aquilino; 2-Belén; 1-Mamadou | | No; Nominations | Paula | No; Nominations | 3-Cristian; 2-Aquilino; 1-Aroa | Not; Eligible | Not; Eligible | Not; Eligible | Evicted (Day 36) | | | |
| Aroa | No; Nominations | In Oasis | In Oasis | No; Nominations | 3-José Manuel; 2-Cristian; 1-Patricia | Exempt | | No; Nominations | Joon | No; Nominations | 3-Cristian; 2-Patricia; 1-Joon | Not; Eligible | Not; Eligible | Evicted (Day 36) | | | | |
| Joon | No; Nominations | 3-Mamadou; 2-Raúl; 1-Belén | | Nominated | 3-Paula; 2-Mamadou; 1-Almudena | ~~6-Íñigo~~ | | No; Nominations | Public; Nominee | No; Nominations | 3-Raúl; 2-Aquilino; 1-Aroa | Not; Eligible | Evicted (Day 36) | | | | | |
| Patricia | No; Nominations | 3-Jonay; 2-Belén; 1-Joon | | Belén | 3-Almudena; 2-Íñigo; 1-Raúl | Nominated | | No; Nominations | Paula | No; Nominations | 3-Raúl; 2-Aquilino; 1-Aroa | Evicted (Day 36) | | | | | | |
| Belén | No; Nominations | 3-Diego; 2-Jonay; 1-Almudena | | No; Nominations | 3-José Manuel; 2-Jonay; 1-Almudena | 3-Joon; 2-Cristian; ~~1-Íñigo~~ | | No; Nominations | Joon | No; Nominations | Evicted (Day 32) | | | | | | | |
| Paula | No; Nominations | 3-Jonay; 2-Belén; 1-Joon | | Belén | 3-Jonay; 2-José Manuel; 1-Joon | Not; Eligible | | No; Nominations | Public; Nominee | Evicted (Day 29) | | | | | | | | |
| Mamadou | No; Nominations | 3-José Manuel; 2-Diego; 1-Almudena | | No; Nominations | 3-José Manuel; 2-Jonay; 1-Íñigo | ~~3-Íñigo~~; 2-Joon; 1-Cristian | | No; Nominations | Evicted (Day 29) | | | | | | | | | |
| José Manuel | No; Nominations | 3-Mamadou; 2-Aquilino; 1-Belén | | Exempt | 3-Paula; 2-Mamadou; 1-Belén | 3-Mamadou; ~~2-Aroa~~; 1-Belén | | Evicted (Day 29) | | | | | | | | | | |
| Íñigo | In Aviary; Exempt | 3-Belén; 2-Mamadou; 1-Aquilino | | Exempt | 3-Patricia; 2-Joon; 1-Cristian | Nominated | Exempt | Walked (Day 27) | | | | | | | | | | |
| Almudena | No; Nominations | 3-Belén; 2-Mamadou; 1-Aquilino | | No; Nominations | 3-Patricia; 2-Cristian; 1-Joon | Evicted (Day 22) | | | | | | | | | | | | |
| Lorena | No; Nominations | 3-Belén; 2-Mamadou; 1-Aquilino | | Nominated | Evicted (Day 18) | | | | | | | | | | | | | |
| Diego | No; Nominations | 3-Mamadou; 2-Aquilino; 1-Belén | | Evicted (Day 15) | | | | | | | | | | | | | | |
| Sofía | In Oasis | | In Oasis | Evicted (Day 11) | | | | | | | | | | | | | | |
| Noah | In Oasis | | In Oasis | Evicted (Day 11) | | | | | | | | | | | | | | |
| Marcos | Refused to enter (Day 1) | | | | | | | | | | | | | | | | | |
| Notes | 1, 2, 3 | 3 | 4 | 5, 6 | 6 | 7, 8 | | 9 | | 9, 10 | 11 | 12 | | | | 13 | 14 | |
| Nominated (pre-save & replace) | Aroa; Lorena; Mamadou; Patricia; Paula; Raúl | Belén; Diego; José Manuel; Mamadou | none | Aquilino; Belén; Cristian; Desirée; Joon; Lorena; Raúl | none | | | | | | Aquilino; Cristian; Raúl; Patricia | none | | | | | | |
| Saved | Mamadou | Mamadou | none | Raúl | none | | | | | | Cristian | none | | | | | | |
| Nominated for eviction | Aroa; Lorena; Patricia; Paula; Raúl | Belén; Diego; José Manuel | Aroa; Cristian; Noah; Rocío; Sofía | Aquilino; Belén; Cristian; Desirée; Joon; Lorena | Almudena; José Manuel; Patricia; Paula | Íñigo | Belén; Íñigo; Joon; José Manuel; Patricia | Aquilino; Aroa; Belén; Cristian; Desirée; Edurne; Jonay; Joon; Mamadou; Patricia; Paula; Raúl; Rocío | Joon; Paula | Aquilino; Aroa; Belén; Cristian; Desirée; Edurne; Jonay; Joon; Patricia; Raúl; Rocío | Aquilino; Raúl; Patricia | Joon; Raúl | Aroa; Rocío | Desirée; Jonay | Aquilino; Edurne | Aquilino; Cristian; Desirée; Raúl; Rocío | Aquilino; Cristian; Raúl; Rocío | |
| Walked | none | | | | | | Íñigo | none | | | | | | | | | | |
| Evicted | Aroa; 46.4% (out of 3) to move | Diego; 41.5% to evict | Sofía; Most votes to evict | Lorena; 52.4% (out of 3) to evict | Almudena; 78.8% (out of 2) to evict | none | José Manuel; 49.0% (out of 3) to evict | Mamadou; Fewest votes to save | Paula; 6 of 10 votes to evict | Belén; Fewest votes to save | Patricia; 57.9% (out of 2) to evict | Joon; Fewest votes to save | Aroa; Fewest votes to save | Jonay; Fewest votes to save | Edurne; Fewest votes to save | Desirée; 6.7% (out of 2) to win | Raúl; 15.4% to win | Aquilino; 15.6% to win |
| Evicted | Aroa; 46.4% (out of 3) to move | Diego; 41.5% to evict | Noah; Most votes to evict | Lorena; 52.4% (out of 3) to evict | Almudena; 78.8% (out of 2) to evict | none | José Manuel; 49.0% (out of 3) to evict | Mamadou; Fewest votes to save | Paula; 6 of 10 votes to evict | Belén; Fewest votes to save | Patricia; 57.9% (out of 2) to evict | Joon; Fewest votes to save | Aroa; Fewest votes to save | Jonay; Fewest votes to save | Edurne; Fewest votes to save | Desirée; 6.7% (out of 2) to win | Cristian; 18.1% to win | |
| Saved from eviction | Paula; Fewest votes (out of 5); Lorena; 12.9% (out of 4); Raúl; 22.9% (out of 3); Patricia; 30.7% (out of 3) | Belén; 39.6% José Manuel; 18.9 | Aroa; Cristian; Rocío; Fewest votes | Cristian; Aquilino; Desirée; Fewest votes (out of 6); Joon; 12.9% (out of 3); Belén; 34.7% | José Manuel; 8.0% (out of 4); Paula; 13.4% (out of 4); Patricia; 21.2% (out of 2) | Íñigo; 60.95% to save | Joon; 12.8% (out of 4); Patricia; 23.0% (out of 3); Belén; 28.0% (out of 3) | Aquilino; Aroa; Belén; Cristian; Desirée; Edurne; Jonay; Joon; Patricia; Paula; Raúl; Rocío; Most votes | Joon; 4 of 10 votes | Aquilino; Aroa; Cristian; Desirée; Edurne; Jonay; Joon; Patricia; Raúl; Rocío; Most votes | Aquilino; Fewest votes (out of 3); Raúl; 42.1% (out of 2) | Raúl; Most votes | Rocío; Most votes | Desirée; Most votes | Aquilino; Most votes | Aquilino; Cristian; Raúl; Most votes (out of 5); Rocío; Most votes (out of 2) | Rocío; 50.9% to win | |

=== Notes ===
- ^Note 1: At the beginning of the season, all housemates were nominated, except Íñigo and Edurne, who had chosen to live in the Aviary (Pajarera) and were granted immunity, and Rocío, Cristian, Noah and Sofía, who were secretly placed in the Oasis. The show announced that traditional nominations would not take place during the first weeks, replacing them with a series of challenges and public votes.
- ^Note 2: On Day 4, the 14 housemates initially nominated took part in several saving games. Íñigo and Edurne, who were living in the Aviary, first saved Jonay. Joon was saved after the other housemates divided themselves into two groups without including him. A timed challenge subsequently saved Aquilino, Desirée, Belén, Almudena, Diego and José Manuel. The four housemates in the Oasis: Rocío, Cristian, Noah and Sofía, were chosen to save Mamadou, while the public saved Paula. Aroa, Lorena, Raúl and Patricia were the remaining nominees.
- ^Note 3: On Day 8, after Lorena and Raúl had been saved, the eviction vote was between Aroa and Patricia. Aroa was announced as evicted but was instead transferred to the Oasis, where she joined Cristian, Noah, Rocío and Sofía. The housemates then held the season's first traditional nominations. They were nominated in pairs and nominated in 3-2-1 points to other housemates. The initial nominees were Mamadou, Belén and Diego. The Oasis housemates could replace one nominee, and Aroa chose to replace Mamadou with José Manuel. The final nominees were Belén, Diego and José Manuel. Patricia and Paula were moved to the Aviary and received immunity.
- ^Note 4: On Day 11, the five housemates in the Oasis: Aroa, Cristian, Noah, Rocío and Sofía, faced a separate public vote to determine which three would enter the main house. Rocío and Cristian were selected to return, while Aroa won a final public vote against Sofía. Noah and Sofía were evicted, bringing the Oasis twist to an end.
- ^Note 5: On Day 15, Diego was evicted after facing Belén and José Manuel. The following nomination process was based on a team challenge. The winning team, Íñigo, Edurne, Jonay and José Manuel, was exempt from nomination and received a secret power to save one housemate. The remaining teams had to decide by consensus which members to nominate, with the number of nominees determined by their teams' rankings. Aquilino volunteered to be nominated from his team, while Raúl and Lorena were selected as the two nominees from their team, leaving Almudena safe. The final team saved Rocío. The winning team used their power to save one of the six nominees. During their discussion, they considered Raúl and Joon as possible choices. They ultimately saved Raúl, believing that Joon had a good chance of being saved by the public vote. Patricia and Paula, who had been living in the Aviary, used their direct nomination privilege to add Belén to the nomination list. The final nominees were Aquilino, Lorena, Desirée, Cristian, Joon and Belén.
- ^Note 6: On Day 18, Lorena was evicted following a public vote among the six nominees from the previous round. After her eviction, the remaining housemates took part in face-to-face nominations. The final nominees were Patricia, Almudena, José Manuel and Paula.
- ^Note 7: On Day 22, Almudena was evicted after receiving 78.8% of the eviction vote. The following nominations were conducted through a telephone twist. Housemates chose the order in which they answered the telephone, with each call determining a power or penalty, including immunity for another housemate, direct nominations, a nomination veto, additional nomination points and a possibility of instant eviction.

- 1. Immunity → Edurne granted immunity to Jonay.
- 2. Face-to-face nomination → Jonay.
- 3. Direct nomination → Raúl directly nominated Patricia.
- 4. Direct nominated → José Manuel was directly nominated.
- 5. Nomination points → Joon received six nomination points and nominated Íñigo.
- 6. Nominate in Confessional → Mamadou
- 7. Face-to-face nomination → Desirée
- 8. No nomination → Aquilino
- 9. Nominate in Confessional → Rocío
- 10. Face-to-face nomination → Belén
- 11. Veto → Paula prevented Cristian from nominating.
The last housemate who did not answer the telephone would face an instant eviction.
- 12. Aroa answered the final call.
- 13. Instant eviction → Íñigo was informed that he had been evicted.

Aroa answered the final call, saving herself. Íñigo was informed that he had been immediately evicted. However, he was then told that the public would decide whether he stayed or was evicted in a 10-minute flash vote. The public voted to save him, with 60.95% of the vote. The final nominees were Patricia, José Manuel, Belén and Joon.

- ^Note 8: Íñigo left the show on Day 27 for personal reasons unrelated to the show. His departure was announced by the production and was not the result of an eviction vote.
- ^Note 9: On Day 29, José Manuel was evicted after facing Belén and Patricia. The show then introduced Mudanzas GH (GH moving truck). The public took part in a positive vote, the housemate with the fewest votes, Mamadou, was evicted. Then, the public voted to nominate Paula and Joon. The remaining housemates then took part in a posicionamiento letal (a housemate positioning vote to determine an eviction), choosing which of the two should leave. Paula received six votes against her, Joon received four votes, therefore, Paula was evicted. A new positive audience vote opened, with the housemate with the fewest votes, being evicted in the following debate show on Day 32.
- ^Note 10: On Day 32, during the fifth debate show following a positive public vote to save. The four housemates who received the fewest votes were Joon, Belén, Jonay and Edurne, and finally, Belén was evicted with the fewest votes.
- ^Note 11: After Belén's eviction on Day 32, the housemates took part in the season's first traditional nominations in the Confessional. However, Rocío, who had won the tarjeta dorada (golden card) in the previous debate show, was allowed to watch the nominations, record the nomination points and save one of the nominees. Edurne and Aquilino also received bonus nomination points after winning a choreography challenge: Edurne gave two extra points to Aquilino, while Aquilino received one extra point and gave it to Jonay. The initial nominees were Cristian (12 points), Patricia (11), Aquilino (10) and Raúl (10). Rocío used her power to save Cristian, leaving Patricia, Aquilino and Raúl as the final nominees.
- ^Note 12: On Day 36, Patricia was evicted with 57.7% of the vote. The show then introduced La última cena (The Last Supper), a series of head-to-head public vote duels with the public vote in each round to decide which housemate would advance to the final. Each duel lasted 20 minutes, and the housemate receiving the most votes remained in the game as a finalist, while the other was evicted. Raúl challenged Joon and defeated him, became the first finalist and selected Rocío for the next duel. Rocío challenged Aroa and defeated her, became the second finalist and selected Desirée for the next duel. Desirée challenged Jonay and defeated him, became the third finalist and selected Aquilino for the next duel. Aquilino challenged Edurne and defeated her, became the fourth finalist. Cristian, as the remaining housemate without an opponent, automatically advanced without taking part in a duel. The five finalists were Raúl, Rocío, Desirée, Aquilino and Cristian.
- ^Note 13: On Day 39, one of the five finalists would be evicted before the finale. The five finalists faced another public vote to win. Raúl, Aquilino and Cristian were announced as finalists and safe, leaving Rocío and Desirée in a final public vote. Rocío advanced to the final, while Desirée was evicted and finished in fifth place.
- ^Note 14: The final took place on Day 43, with Raúl, Rocío, Aquilino and Cristian competed for the winner. Raúl finished in fourth place and Aquilino in third, leaving Rocío and Cristian in the final duel. Rocío was then announced as the winner of the season, with Cristian finishing second.
