= Gran Hermano Dúo 3 =

Spanish television show

- Season 3
- Presented by: Carlos Sobera
- No. of days: 62
- No. of housemates: 15
- Winner: Marieta Díaz
- Runner-up: Maica Benedicto

Release
- Original network: Telecinco
- Original release: 2 January – 4 March 2025

Season chronology
- ← Previous; Gran Hermano Dúo 2

Gran Hermano Dúo 3 is the third season of Gran Hermano Dúo, spin-off of the Spanish reality TV franchise Gran Hermano. The season was launched on 2 January 2025 on Telecinco. Carlos Sobera is the host of this version of the show, and Ion Aramendi is the host of the weekly Debate.

== Housemates ==
The first official housemate of the season, Marieta Díaz, was announced on 16 December 2024, during the semi-finale of Gran Hermano 19. The rest of the housemates were confirmed days later and, some of them, during the first program of the season.

Housemates	Age	Famous for being...	Entered	Exited	Status
Marieta Díaz Manuel and Sergio's ex-affaire	25	LIDLT 7 star	Day 1	Day 62	Winner
Maica Benedicto Óscar's ex-friend	25	Gran Hermano 19 contestant	Day 1	Day 62	Runner-up
Óscar Landa Maica's ex-friend	38	Gran Hermano 19 contestant	Day 1	Day 62	3rd Place
Sergio Aguilera Marieta's ex-affaire	29	LIDLT 7 star	Day 1	Day 62	4th Place
(Argentina) Romina Malaspina Paired with Javier and Vanessa	30	Model and reality TV star	Day 1	Day 57	11th Evicted
Jose Mª Almoguera Paired with Jeimy	34	Carmen Borrego's son	Day 1	Day 57	10th Evicted
(Romania) Álex Ghita Miguel's ex-friend	31	Adara Molinero's ex-boyfriend	Day 1	Day 22	3rd Evicted
(Romania) Álex Ghita Miguel's ex-friend	31	Adara Molinero's ex-boyfriend	Day 34	Day 55	9th Evicted
Miguel Frigenti Álex's ex-friend	37	Journalist	Day 1	Day 50	8th Evicted
María Sánchez Daniel's friend	33	Gran Hermano 12+1 contestant	Day 1	Day 43	7th Evicted
Daniel Santos María's friend	31	Gran Hermano 12+1 contestant	Day 1	Day 36	6th Evicted
(Dominican Republic) Jeimy Báez Paired with Jose Mª	28	Carlo Constanzia Jr's ex-girlfriend	Day 1	Day 29	5th Evicted
Manuel Cortés Marieta's ex-affaire	29	Cantaor	Day 1	Day 29	4th Evicted
Manuel Cortés Marieta's ex-affaire	29	Cantaor	Day 34	Day 36	4th Evicted
Javier Mouzo Vanessa's husband / Paired with Romina	42	Gran Hermano 19 contestant	Day 1	Day 29	Walked
(Venezuela) Ana Herminia Illas Aurah's TV enemy	52	Ángel Cristo Jr's wife	Day 1	Day 15	2nd Evicted
Vanessa Bouza Javier's wife / Paired with Romina	38	Gran Hermano 19 contestant	Day 1	Day 8	1st Evicted
Aurah Ruiz Ana Herminia's TV enemy	35	MYHYV star	Day 1	Day 8	Infiltrated Housemate

== Nominations table ==
HouseGuests nominate with three and one points, shown in descending order in the nomination box. The four or more HouseGuests with the most nomination points face the public vote.

	Duos Phase						Individual Phase					
	Week 1	Week 2	Week 3	Week 4	Week 5		Week 6	Week 7	Week 8		Week 9 Final	
	Week 1	Week 2	Week 3	Week 4	Week 5		Week 6	Week 7	Day 50	Day 55	Week 9 Final	
Head(s) of Household	Manuel, Marieta & Sergio	Manuel, Marieta & Sergio	Jeimy & Jose Mª	Marieta	none		Óscar	Óscar	Sergio	none		
Marieta	(2) Javier, Romina & Vanessa (2) Álex & Miguel	Javier & Romina; Maica & Óscar	Alex & Miguel; Maica & Óscar	Miguel; Maica & Óscar	Nominated	(6) Maica & Óscar (2) Miguel & Romina	~~Nominated~~	Miguel; Maica; Romina	(2) Álex	No; Nominations	No; Nominations	Winner (Day 62)
Maica	(3) Ana Herminia	Jeimy & Jose Mª; Ana Herminia	Manuel, Marieta & Sergio; Daniel & María	Manuel & Sergio; Jeimy & Jose Mª	Nominated	(6) Miguel & Romina (2) ~~Daniel~~ & María	Nominated	Marieta; José Mª; Sergio	(2) Marieta	No; Nominations	No; Nominations	Runner-up (Day 62)
Óscar	(3) Ana Herminia	Jeimy & Jose Mª; Ana Herminia	Manuel, Marieta & Sergio; Daniel & María	Manuel & Sergio; Jeimy & Jose Mª	Nominated	(6) Miguel & Romina (2) ~~Daniel~~ & María	Saved	José Mª; Marieta; Miguel	(2) Marieta	No; Nominations	No; Nominations	Third Place (Day 62)
Sergio	(2) Javier, Romina & Vanessa (2) Álex & Miguel	Javier & Romina; Maica & Óscar	Alex & Miguel; Maica & Óscar	Miguel; Maica & Óscar	Nominated	(6) Maica & Óscar (2) Miguel & Romina	Saved	Miguel; Maica; Romina	(1) Romina (1) Óscar	No; Nominations	No; Nominations	Fourth Place (Day 62)
Romina	(3) Jeimy & Jose Mª (3) Ana Herminia	Ana Herminia; Daniel & María	Maica & Óscar; Daniel & María	Manuel & Sergio; Jeimy & Jose Mª	Nominated	Maica & Óscar; Jose Mª	Nominated	Marieta; Sergio; José Mª	(2) Álex (1) Marieta (1) Jose Mª	No; Nominations	Evicted (Day 57)	
Jose Mª	(3) Javier, Romina & Vanessa (3) Maica & Óscar	Álex & Miguel; Maica & Óscar	Daniel & María; Manuel, Marieta & Sergio	Miguel; Maica & Óscar	Nominated	(6) Miguel & Romina (2) Óscar & Maica	Saved	Not eligible	(1) Álex (2) Romina (1) Óscar	No; Nominations	Evicted (Day 57)	
Álex	Not eligible	Ana Herminia; Jeimy & Jose Mª	Daniel & María; Manuel, Marieta & Sergio	Evicted (Day 22)		Candidate	Exempt	Marieta; José Mª; Sergio	(2) Romina	Evicted (Day 55)		
Miguel	Not eligible	Ana Herminia; Jeimy & Jose Mª	Daniel & María; Manuel, Marieta & Sergio	Manuel & Sergio; Jeimy & Jose Mª	Nominated	Maica & Óscar; Jose Mª	Nominated	Marieta; José Mª; Sergio	Evicted (Day 50)			
María	(3) Ana Herminia (1) Javier, Romina & Vanessa	Javier & Romina; Ana Herminia	Álex & Miguel; Javier & Romina	Miguel; Maica & Óscar	Nominated	Miguel & Romina; Maica & Óscar	Nominated	Evicted (Day 43)				
Daniel	(3) Ana Herminia (1) Javier, Romina & Vanessa	Javier & Romina; Ana Herminia	Álex & Miguel; Javier & Romina	Miguel; Maica & Óscar	Nominated	Nominated	Evicted (Day 36)					
Jeimy	(3) Javier, Romina & Vanessa (3) Maica & Óscar	Álex & Miguel; Maica & Óscar	Daniel & María; Manuel, Marieta & Sergio	Miguel; Maica & Óscar	Nominated	Evicted (Day 29)						
Manuel	(2) Javier, Romina & Vanessa (2) Álex & Miguel	Javier & Romina; Maica & Óscar	Alex & Miguel; Maica & Óscar	Miguel; Maica & Óscar	Evicted (Day 29)	Candidate	Re-Evicted (Day 36)					
Javier	(3) Jeimy & Jose Mª (3) Ana Herminia	Ana Herminia; Daniel & María	Maica & Óscar; Daniel & María	Manuel & Sergio; Jeimy & Jose Mª	Walked (Day 29)							
Ana Herminia	(2) Javier, Romina & Vanessa	Álex & Miguel; Javier & Romina	Evicted (Day 15)									
Vanessa	(3) Jeimy & Jose Mª (3) Ana Herminia	Evicted (Day 8)										
Aurah	Infiltrated	Discovered (Day 8)										
Notes	1, 2, 3	4	5, 6	7	8	9, 10	11, 12, 13, 14	15, 16	17, 18, 19	20	21	
Nominated (pre-save & replace)	none	Álex; Ana Herminia; Javier; Miguel; Romina	Álex; Manuel; Marieta; Miguel; Sergio	none	none	Daniel; Maica; Miguel; Óscar; Romina	Maica; Marieta; Miguel; Romina	José Mª; Marieta; Miguel; Sergio	Álex; Maica; Marieta; Romina	none		
Saved	none	Miguel	Marieta	none	none	Maica	Marieta	none		none		
Nominated for eviction	Álex; Ana Herminia; Javier; Romina; Vanessa	Álex; Ana Herminia; Javier; Maica; Óscar; Romina	Álex; Maica; Manuel; Miguel; Sergio	Javier; Jeimy; José Mª; Óscar; Maica; Manuel; Miguel; Sergio	All; Housemates	Daniel; Miguel; Óscar; Romina; Sergio	Maica; María; Miguel; Romina	José Mª; Marieta; Miguel; Sergio	Álex; Maica; Marieta; Romina	José Mª; Maica; Marieta; Óscar; Romina; Sergio	Maica; Marieta; Óscar; Sergio	
Evicted	Vanessa; 74% to evict (out of 2)	Ana Herminia; 70.5% to evict (out of 2)	Álex; 58% to evict (out of 2)	Manuel; 68% to evict (out of 2)	Jeimy; Fewest votes to save (out of 2)	Daniel; 58% to evict (out of 2)	María; 50.8% to evict (out of 2)	Miguel; 57% to evict (out of 2)	Álex; 70% to evict (out of 2)	José Mª; 1% to save (out of 6)	Sergio; 13.3% to win (out of 4)	Óscar; 30.1% to win (out of 3)
Evicted	Vanessa; 74% to evict (out of 2)	Ana Herminia; 70.5% to evict (out of 2)	Álex; 58% to evict (out of 2)	Manuel; 68% to evict (out of 2)	Jeimy; Fewest votes to save (out of 2)	Daniel; 58% to evict (out of 2)	María; 50.8% to evict (out of 2)	Miguel; 57% to evict (out of 2)	Álex; 70% to evict (out of 2)	Romina; 9% to save (out of 5)	Maica; 48.3% to win (out of 2)	Marieta; 51.7% to win (out of 2)

=== Notes ===
This housemate was the Head of Household.
This housemate was directly nominated for eviction prior to the regular nominations process.
This housemate was granted immunity from nominations.

- ^Note 1: Aurah was revealed as the infiltrated housemate and she is not participating. However she was paired with Ana Herminia. In the first round of nominations she falsely won immunity.
- ^Note 2: The housemates had to earn points to nominate from a physical task.
- ^Note 3: The HoHs won inmunity and the power to automatically nominate a Housemate. Manuel, Marieta & Sergio nominated Álex.
- ^Note 4: The HoHs won inmunity and the power to save a Housemate and also automatically nominate two Housemates. Manuel, Marieta & Sergio saved Miguel and nominated Maica and Óscar.
- ^Note 5: This week, each couple of Housemates had to choose between two doors. One of them let them nominate as usual with 3 and 1 points while the other room let them to nominate with -3 and -1 points.
- ^Note 6: The HoHs won inmunity and the power to save a Housemate and remplace him/her with another one. Jeimy & José Mª saved Marieta and nominated Maica.
- ^Note 7: Manuel, Marieta and Sergio won immunity in a challenge, however, the rest of housemates had to pick only one of them to get immunity. The final HoH was Marieta chosen by the housemates. The trio also had the power to nominate a housemate, they chosen Javier.
- ^Note 8: All the housemates were automatically nominated and the housemates who received the fewest votes were evicted. The housemates who received the second lowest number of votes would still be nominated for the next round of nominations.
- ^Note 9: This week, housemates could win extra points in a challenge and nominate with 6 and 2 points, however not all of them passed the challenge.
- ^Note 10: Maica won the power to save a nominee and replace her/him with another one. She saved herself and nominated Sergio.
- ^Note 11: Since this week, the housemates participate individually and nominate with 3, 2 and 1 point.
- ^Note 12: Following a chain of decisions, the housemates had to decide the nominees of this week.
- ^Note 13: Óscar won a challenge and received the power to save a nominee and replace another one. He saved Marieta and nominated María.
- ^Note 14: Álex re-entered the house as the winner of the repechage and for this reasons he was exempt from nominations.
- ^Note 15: This week the housemates' relatives nominated.
- ^Note 16: Óscar won a task and he received three powers. He received immunity; he also could veto a housemate, he vetoed José Mª; and finally he had the chance to save a nominated housemate and replace her/him with himself, he decides not to use this last power.
- ^Note 17: Each housemate had five balloons and each one in a random order had to explode two balloons. The first three housemates with no balloons were nominated.
- ^Note 18: In a second round, the last housemate standing with balloons would become HoH and received immunity and therefore a finalist. Sergio became HoH and the power of this week was choosing a non nominated housemate as a finalist. He chose Jose Mª.
- ^Note 19: The nominated housemates (Álex, Marieta and Romina) had to decide who would be nominated between the rest of non nominated housemates Maica or Óscar. They nominated Maica.
- ^Note 20: Lines were opened to save rather to evict.
- ^Note 21: Lines were opened to vote for the winner.

== Nominations total received ==
	Week 1	Week 2	Week 3	Week 4	Week 5		Week 6	Week 7	Week 8	Week 9	Final		Total
Marieta	–	–	3	–	-	0	-	14	5	-	-	Winner	22
Maica	3	2	-2	3	-	12	-	4	0	-	-	Runner-up	22
Óscar	3	2	-2	3	-	12	-	-	2	-	-		20
Sergio	–	–	3	9	-	0	-	5	-	-	-		17
Romina	8	7	1	0	-	16	-	2	5	-	Evicted		39
Jose Mª	3	4	-	3	-	1	-	10	1	-	Evicted		22
Álex	2	6	6	Evicted			-	0	5	Evicted			19
Miguel	2	6	6	9	-	16	-	7	Evicted				46
María	0	1	0	0	-	2	-	Evicted					3
Daniel	0	1	0	0	-	~~2~~	Evicted						1
Jeimy	3	4	-	3	-	Evicted							10
Manuel	–	–	3	9	Evicted								12
Javier	8	7	1	0	Walked								16
Ana Herminia	9	8	Evicted										17
Vanessa	8	Evicted											8

== Blind results ==
Week	1st Place to Evict	2nd Place to Evict	3rd Place to Evict	4th Place to Evict	5th Place to Evite	6th Place to Evict	7th Place to Evict	8th Place to Evict
1	61%	25%	9%	4%	1%			
1	65%	22%	13%					
1	63%	21%	16%					
2	66%	13%	10%	8%	2%	1%		
2	60%	15%	14%	8%	3%			
2	60%	16%	15%	9%				
2	60%	22%	18%					
2	73%	27%						
3	54%	18%	12%	11%	5%			
3	55.1%	23.2%	11.1%	10.6%				
3	54.5%	24.5%	10.8%	10.2%				
3	57%	31%	12%					
3	56%	32%	12%					
3	63%	37%						
3	60%	40%						
4	43.3%	20.3%	15.2%	9.0%	6.7%	2.3%	1.7%	1.5%
4	47%	19%	18%	9%	7%			
4	51%	21%	19%	9%				
4	54%	25%	21%					
4	68%	32%						
5	44%	25%	22%	6%	3%			
5	45%	26%	24%	5%				
5	46%	31%	23%					
5	58%	42%						
Rep.	57%	33%	10%					
Rep.	53%	47%						
Rep.	55%	45%						
6	51%	38%	9%	2%				
6	49%	41%	10%					
6	52.5%	47.5%						
6	52.3%	47.7%						
6	52%	48%						
6	51.2%	48.8%						
6	50.9%	49.1%						
6	50.8%	49.2%						
7	46%	28%	21%	5%				
7	48%	31%	21%					
7	57%	43%						
8	56%	23%	21%					
8	70%	30%						
Final	33%	28%	17%	10%	10%	2%		
Final	30%	27%	23%	10%	9%	1%		
Final	31.9%	28.8%	27%	12.3%				
Final	30.6%	28.2%	27.8%	13.4%				
Final	30.5%	28.4%	27.8%	13.3%				
Final	30.2%	29.1%	27.4%	13.3%				
Final	35.3%	34.1%	30.6%					
Final	36.6%	33.3%	30.1%					
Final	51.9%	48.1%						
Final	51.6%	48.4%						
Final	51.7%	48.3%						

== Repechage ==
On day 32, following Manuel and Jeimy's eliminations, a public vote was opened to bring back one of the remaining eliminated housemates: Vanessa, Álex, Manuel and Jeimy. Ana Herminia refused to participate alleging health issues. On 4 February, Vanessa withdrew from the repechage.

Ex-housemate	%	Day of elimination
Álex	N/A	Gala 6 February 2025
Manuel	N/A	Gala 6 February 2025
Vanessa	N/A	Límite 24 horas 4 February 2025
Jeimy	N/A	Debate 2 February 2025

== Ratings ==
=== "Galas" ===
Show N°	Day	Viewers	Ratings share
1 – Launch	Thursday, January 2	976.000	14.2%
2	Sunday, January 5	824.000	9.9%
3	Thursday, January 9	880.000	14.2%
4	Thursday, January 16	800.000	12.6%
5	Thursday, January 23	765.000	13.6%
6	Thursday, January 30	848.000	13.6%
7	Thursday, February 6	839.000	14.2%
8	Thursday, February 13	918.000	14.5%
9	Thursday, February 20	841.000	14%
10	Tuesday, 27 February	888.000	13.9%

=== "Debates" ===
Show N°	Day	Viewers	Ratings share
1	Sunday, January 12	880.000	11.6%
2	Sunday, January 19	618.000	10.1%
3	Sunday, January 26	648.000	11.4%
4	Sunday, February 2	693.000	12,9%
5	Sunday, February 9	608.000	10.5%
6	Sunday, February 16	688.000	12.8%
7	Sunday, February 23	640.000	11.9%
8	Sunday, March 2		

=== "Límite 48h" ===
Show N°	Day	Viewers	Ratings share
1	Tuesday, January 7	731.000	11.4%
2	Tuesday, January 14	709.000	11.9%
3	Tuesday, January 21	654.000	10.5%
4	Tuesday, January 28	729.000	11.3%
5	Tuesday, February 4	726.000	12.9%
6	Tuesday, February 11	699.000	11.9%
7	Tuesday, February 18	723.000	11.9%
8	Tuesday, February 25	683.000	11.5%
