= Big Brother 14 =

Big Brother 14 is the fourteenth season of various versions of Big Brother and may refer to:

- Big Brother 14 (American TV series), the 2012 edition of the American version of Big Brother
- Gran Hermano 14 (Spanish TV series), the 2013 edition of the Spanish version of Big Brother
- Big Brother 14 (British TV series), the 2013 edition of the UK version of Big Brother
- Big Brother Brasil 14, the 2014 edition of the Brazilian version of Big Brother
- Bigg Boss 14, 2020 fourteenth season of Big Brother in India in Hindi

== See also ==
- Big Brother (franchise)
- Big Brother (disambiguation)
