= Óscar Martínez (presenter) =

Spanish TV presenter (born 1976)

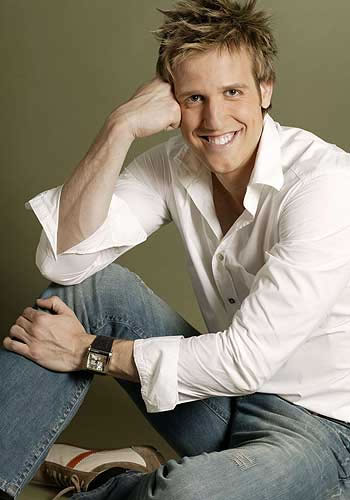
Óscar Martínez

Óscar Martínez (born 1 June 1976 in Madrid) is a Spanish television presenter. Since September 2012 he also hosts the Night Show of radio station Cadena 100.
