= Gran Hermano (Spanish TV series) season 19 =

Gran Hermano
- Season 19
- Presented by: Jorge Javier Vazquez
- No. of days: 106
- No. of housemates: 19
- Winner: Juan Luis Quintana
- Runner-up: Óscar Landa

Release
- Original network: Telecinco
- Original release: 5 September – 19 December 2024

Season chronology
- ← Previous; Season 18 Next → Uno de GH20; Season 20

Gran Hermano 19, also known as Gran Hermano 2024, is the nineteenth season of Gran Hermano, the Spanish version of the reality television series franchise Big Brother.

The 19th season started airing on 5 September 2024 on Telecinco with Jorge Javier Vázquez hosting the main live shows or "Galas" and "Límite 48h". Also, Ion Aramendi hosts the Debate in this season.

== Housemates ==
In this season, there is a double game. On Day 1, thirteen housemates (Adrián, Daniela, Eduardo, Elsa, Juan, Laura, Maica, Maite, Manuel, Nerea, Óscar, Rubén, and Vanessa) moved to the Main House. In contrast, the remaining six (Javier, Jorge, Lucía, Luis, Silvia, and Violeta) moved into the Secret House, where the housemates have a certain connection with some other housemates in the main house or between them. Each week two housemates from the Secret House will move to the Main House and vice versa.

Here are the connections between the housemates in both houses:

- Luis and Violeta are Nerea's boyfriend and ex-friend respectively who had an affair in the past.
- Jorge met Violeta in the casting process and felt some kind of connection with her.
- Lucía and Silvia are twins and they have to pretend they don't know each other.
- Javier is Vanessa's husband and he was told he was going to enter with her but in the end Vanessa entered to the house and was sent to the secret house.

Housemates	Age	Residence	Occupation	Day entered	Day exited	Status
Juan Luis Quintana	29	Lanzarote	Entertainment director and dancer	Day 36	Day 106	Winner
Juan Luis Quintana	29	Lanzarote	Entertainment director and dancer	Day 1	Day 36	3rd evicted
Óscar Landa	38	San Sebastián	Riding instructor	Day 1	Day 106	Runner-up
Rubén "Ruvens" Pérez	29	Albacete	Film director	Day 74	Day 106	3rd Place
Rubén "Ruvens" Pérez	29	Albacete	Film director	Day 1	Day 71	8th evicted
Violeta Crespo	22	Toledo	Dance teacher and former beauty queen	Day 1	Day 104	17th evicted
Eduardo "Edi" Insua	34	Fisterra	Businessman	Day 1	Day 99	16th evicted
Nerea Minguela	20	Alcorcón	Law student & English teacher	Day 1	Day 99	15th evicted
Jorge Pérez	32	Fisterra	Soldier and military	Day 1	Day 97	14th evicted
Maica Benedicto	25	Cartagena	Model and Medical sales representative	Day 1	Day 92	13th evicted
Adrián Creus	26	Tarragona (originally from Senegal)	Professional boxer	Day 1	Day 92	Ejected
Daniela Cano	31	Barcelona (originally from Colombia)	Finance graduate	Day 1	Day 90	12th evicted
Luis García	22	Alcorcón	Delivery-man and Marketing student	Day 1	Day 85	11th evicted
Laura Galera	20	Seville	Nursing assistant and waitress	Day 71	Day 85	10th evicted
Laura Galera	20	Seville	Nursing assistant and waitress	Day 1	Day 64	7th evicted
Manuel Vulcán	22	Cádiz	DJ	Day 1	Day 78	9th evicted
Lucía Rolek	25	Madrid (originally from Poland)	Law student and restaurant manager	Day 74	Day 78	6th evicted
Lucía Rolek	25	Madrid (originally from Poland)	Law student and restaurant manager	Day 1	Day 57	6th evicted
Javier Mouzo	41	Ferrol	Orchestra singer	Day 1	Day 50	Walked
Vanessa Bouza	39	Ferrol	Orchestra singer	Day 74	Day 76	5th evicted
Vanessa Bouza	39	Ferrol	Orchestra singer	Day 1	Day 50	5th evicted
Silvia Rolek	25	Madrid (originally from Poland)	Restaurant manager and waitress	Day 1	Day 43	4th evicted
Maite Benítez	35	Ampuero	Canning factory worker	Day 1	Day 29	2nd evicted
Elsa Mateos	30	Bilbao	Shop assistant and bartender	Day 74	Day 78	1st evicted
Elsa Mateos	30	Bilbao	Shop assistant and bartender	Day 1	Day 25	1st evicted

== Nomination table ==
This season, all housemates were able to nominate 3 other housemates each week. The first Housemate listed is nominated for three points, the next housemate is nominated for two points, while the last housemate listed is nominated for one point.

	Week 1	Week 2	Week 3	Week 4	Week 5	Week 6	Week 7	Week 8	Week 9	Week 10	Week 11	Week 12		Week 13		Week 14		Week 15		
	Week 1	Week 2	Week 3	Week 4	Week 5	Week 6	Week 7	Week 8	Week 9	Week 10	Week 11	Week 12		Week 13		Week 14		Finale		
	Week 1	Week 2	Week 3	Week 4	Week 5	Week 6	Week 7	Week 8	Week 9	Week 10	Week 11	Day 78	Day 85		Day 90	Day 92	Day 97	Day 99	Day 104	Day 106
Big Bro's	none	Edi; Elsa; Manu	Lucía	none	Laura; Silvia	Manu	Manu	Manu	Adrián	Violeta	Daniela				none					
Juan	Daniela; Maica; Nerea	Luis; Ruvens; Óscar	Secret House	Nominated	Vanessa; Nerea; Daniela	Evicted (Day 36)	Daniela; Lucía; Maica	Óscar; Lucía; Adrián	Óscar; Nerea; Maica	(1) Maica (1) Daniela (1) Óscar (-3) Juan	Óscar; Nerea; Jorge	Óscar; Edi; Nerea	Nominated	(2) Óscar (1) ~~Óscar~~	Óscar; Ruvens; Maica	No; Nominations	No; Nominations	No; Nominations	Winner (Day 106)	
Óscar	Maite; Laura; Ruvens	Laura; Manu; Luis	Secret House	Nominated	Laura; Juan; Violeta	Saved	Juan; Javier; Lucía	Lucía; Maica; Nerea	Juan; Luis; Violeta	(3) Juan (-3) Óscar	Not; Eligible	Not; Eligible	Nominated	Not; Eligible	Not; Eligible	No; Nominations	No; Nominations	No; Nominations	Runner-up (Day 106)	
Ruvens	Juan; Daniela; Nerea	Juan; Óscar; Nerea	Nerea; Luis; Lucía	Nominated	Vanessa; Daniela; Nerea	Saved	Javier; Daniela; Lucía	Lucía; Maica; Nerea	Nerea; Luis; Maica	(2) Nerea (1) Luis (-3) Edi	Candidate	Exempt	Nominated	(2) Violeta (1) Adrián	Nerea; Maica; Juan	No; Nominations	No; Nominations	No; Nominations	Third Place (Day 106)	
Violeta	Secret House	Luis; Ruvens; Óscar	Adrián; Elsa; Maite	Nominated	Laura; Juan; Adrián	Exempt	Daniela; Javier; Adrián	Óscar; Lucía; Adrián	Adrián; Laura; Ruvens	(3) Ruvens (-2) Nerea (-1) Luis	Manu; Óscar; Adrián	Laura; Adrián; Juan	Nominated	(2) Ruvens (1) ~~Óscar~~	Maica; Óscar; Adrián	No; Nominations	No; Nominations	No; Nominations	Evicted (Day 104)	
Edi	Daniela; Óscar; Vanessa	Óscar; Luis; Violeta	Lucía; Luis; Nerea	Nominated	Vanessa; Nerea; Daniela	Nominated	Daniela; Javier; Lucía	Lucía; Maica; Nerea	Maica; Nerea; Daniela	(2) Daniela (1) Maica (-3) Ruvens	Óscar; Luis; Nerea	Adrián; Juan; Laura	Nominated	(6) Maica (1) ~~Maica~~ (1) Adrián; Óscar	Maica; Adrián; Juan	No; Nominations	No; Nominations	Evicted (Day 99)		
Nerea	Maite; Ruvens; Juan	Ruvens; Juan; Laura	Elsa; Adrián; Maite	Nominated	Laura; Juan; Adrián	Nominated	Manu; Javier; Daniela	Óscar; Lucía; Adrián	Adrián; Manu; Laura; Manu	(2) Ruvens (1) Adrián (-2) Nerea (-1) Violeta	Manu; Óscar; Adrián	Juan; Laura; Adrián	Nominated	(1) Ruvens (1) Adrián (1) ~~Adrián~~	Adrián; Ruvens; Óscar	No; Nominations	No; Nominations	Evicted (Day 99)		
Jorge	Secret; House			Nominated	Vanessa; Lucía; Silvia	Nominated	Vanessa	Óscar; Lucía; Adrián	Daniela; Adrián; Maica	(3) Adrián (-3) Jorge	Adrián; Óscar; Juan	Maica; Adrián; Juan	Nominated	(1) Maica (1) Adrián (1) ~~Adrián~~	Maica; Adrián; Juan	No; Nominations	Evicted (Day 97)			
Maica	Laura; Maite; Ruvens	Laura; Manu; Luis	Not; Eligible	Nominated	Laura; Juan; Violeta	Saved	Edi; Juan; Manu	Luis; Ruvens; Edi	Laura; Manu; Ruvens	(3) Juan (-3) Maica	Nominated	Edi; Óscar; Jorge	Nominated	(1) Edi (1) ~~Edi~~ (1) ~~Violeta~~	Ruvens; Edi; Jorge	Evicted (Day 92)				
Adrián	Daniela; Vanessa; Maite	Nerea; Luis; Violeta	Luis; Manu; Manu	Nominated	Vanessa; Nerea; Daniela	Nominated	Javier; Nerea; Luis	Óscar; Lucía; Adrián	Jorge; Luis; Nerea	(2) Jorge (1) Luis (-2) Ruvens (-1) Juan	Jorge; Luis; Nerea	Jorge; Nerea; Luis	Nominated	(2) Jorge (1) Violeta	Óscar; Ruvens; Nerea	Ejected (Day 92)				
Daniela	Maite; Laura; Ruvens	Secret; House		Nominated	Laura; Juan; Violeta	Nominated	Juan; Edi; Violeta	Luis; Ruvens; Edi	Manu; Laura; Ruvens	(3) Ruvens (-3) Daniela	Jorge; Edi; Luis	Edi; Óscar; Jorge	Nominated	(2) Violeta (1) ~~Violeta~~	Evicted (Day 90)					
Luis	Secret House	Ruvens; Juan; Laura	Luis; Manu; Manu	Nominated	Laura; Juan; Adrián	Saved	Daniela; Lucía; Adrián	Óscar; Lucía; Adrián	Laura; Adrián; Manu	(2) Ruvens (1) Adrián (-2) Luis (-1) Nerea	Óscar; Manu; Adrián	Laura; Adrián; Juan	Nominated	Evicted (Day 85)						
Laura	Maica; Óscar; Vanessa	Óscar; Juan; Nerea	Lucía; Luis; Nerea	Nominated	Vanessa; Daniela; Nerea	Nominated	Javier; Lucía; Daniela	Lucía; Maica; Nerea	Daniela; Maica; Luis	Evicted (Day 64)	Exempt	Edi; Maica; Nerea	Re-Evicted (Day 85)							
Manu	Daniela; Vanessa; Óscar	Óscar; Juan; Nerea	Luis; Manu; Manu	Nominated	Vanessa; Daniela; Nerea	Saved	Javier; Daniela; Lucía	Lucía; Maica; Nerea	Daniela; Luis; Maica	(2) Nerea (1) Violeta (-3) Ruvens	Nerea; Luis; Violeta	Evicted (Day 78)								
Lucía	Secret; House		Not; Eligible	Nominated	Laura; Juan; Edi	Saved	Laura; Edi; Juan	Luis; Ruvens; Edi	Evicted (Day 57)		Candidate	Re-Evicted (Day 78)								
Javier	Secret; House			Nominated	Ruvens; Laura; Juan	Nominated	Edi; Ruvens; Laura	Walked (Day 50)												
Vanessa	Maite; Laura; Ruvens	Secret; House		Nominated	Laura; Juan; Edi	Saved	Ruvens; Edi; Laura	Evicted (Day 50)			Candidate	Re-Evicted (Day 76)								
Silvia	Secret; House			Nominated	Laura; Juan; Edi	Nominated	Evicted (Day 43)				Candidate	Evicted (Day 43)								
Maite	Vanessa; Óscar; Daniela	Juan; Óscar; Nerea	(6) Luis	Nominated	Evicted (Day 29)						Candidate	Evicted (Day 29)								
Elsa	Maica; Daniela; Óscar	Óscar; Luis; Violeta	Luis; Lucía; Nerea	Nominated	Evicted (Day 25)						Candidate	Re-Evicted (Day 78)								
Notes	1	2, 3	4, 5, 6	7	8, 9, 10	11, 12, 13	14, 15, 16	17, 18, 19	20, 21	22, 23, 24	25, 26, 27, 28, 29	28, 29, 30, 31, 32	33	28, 29, 34, 35, 36	29, 37	38			39	
Nominated (pre-save & replace)	none	Juan; Luis; Nerea; Óscar; Ruvens	Laura; Lucía; Luis; Nerea	none	Javier; Jorge; Laura; Vanessa	Adrián; Daniela; Edi; Javier; Jorge; Laura; Nerea; Silvia	Daniela; Javier; ~~Jorge~~; Lucía; Vanessa	Juan; Lucía; Luis; Maica; Óscar; Ruvens	Adrián; Daniela; Laura; Luis; Maica; Manu	Adrián; Daniela; Juan; Ruvens; Violeta	Daniela; Jorge; Luis; Manu; Nerea; Óscar	Adrián; Daniela; Edi; Laura	none	Adrián; Daniela; Maica; Óscar; Violeta	none					
Saved	none	Ruvens	Lucía	none	Laura; Vanessa	Laura	Jorge; Lucía	Ruvens	Adrián	Violeta	Óscar	Adrián	none	Maica	none					
Nominated for eviction	Daniela; Laura; Maite; Vanessa	Juan; Luis; Nerea; Óscar	Laura; Luis; Nerea	All; Housemates	Javier; Jorge; Juan	Adrián; Daniela; Edi; Javier; Jorge; Nerea; Silvia	Daniela; Javier; Vanessa	Juan; Lucía; Luis; Maica; Óscar	Daniela; Laura; Luis; Maica; Manu	Adrián; Daniela; Juan; Ruvens	Maica	Daniela; Edi; Laura	All; Housemates	Adrián; Daniela; Óscar; Violeta	~~Adrián~~; Maica; Óscar; Ruvens	Edi; Jorge; Juan; Nerea; Óscar; Ruvens; Violeta	Edi; Juan; Nerea; Óscar; Ruvens; Violeta	Juan; Óscar; Ruvens; Violeta	Juan; Óscar; Ruvens	
Nominated for eviction	Daniela; Laura; Maite; Vanessa	Juan; Luis; Nerea; Óscar	Laura; Luis; Nerea	All; Housemates	Javier; Jorge; Juan	Adrián; Daniela; Edi; Javier; Jorge; Nerea; Silvia	Daniela; Javier; Vanessa	Juan; Lucía; Luis; Maica; Óscar	Daniela; Laura; Luis; Maica; Manu	Adrián; Daniela; Juan; Ruvens	Daniela; Jorge; Luis; Manu; Nerea	Daniela; Edi; Laura	All; Housemates	Adrián; Daniela; Óscar; Violeta	~~Adrián~~; Maica; Óscar; Ruvens	Edi; Jorge; Juan; Nerea; Óscar; Ruvens; Violeta	Edi; Juan; Nerea; Óscar; Ruvens; Violeta	Juan; Óscar; Ruvens; Violeta	Juan; Óscar; Ruvens	
Walked	none						Javier	none												
Ejected	none														Adrián	none				
Evicted	Daniela; 52% to move	Óscar; 39.7% to move (out of 3)	Laura; Most votes to move	Elsa; 3.41% to save (out of 19)	Juan; 58% to evict (out of 2)	Silvia; Most votes to evict (out of 3)	Vanessa; 80% to evict (out of 2)	Lucía; Most votes to evict (out of 3)	Laura; 63% to evict (out of 2)	Ruvens; 55% to evict (out of 2)	Maica; More votes to stay	Laura; 52% to evict (out of 2)	Luis; Fewest votes to save (out of 11)	Daniela; 53% to evict (out of 2)	Maica; 50.2% to evict (out of 2)	Jorge; 3% to save (out of 7)	Nerea; 4% to save (out of 6)	Violeta; 15% to save (out of 4)	Ruvens; 21% to win (out of 3)	Óscar; 46.8% to win (out of 2)
Evicted	Vanessa; 32% to move	Juan; 38.9% to move (out of 3)	Nerea; Most votes to move	Maite; Fewest votes to save (out of 18)	Juan; 58% to evict (out of 2)	Silvia; Most votes to evict (out of 3)	Vanessa; 80% to evict (out of 2)	Lucía; Most votes to evict (out of 3)	Laura; 63% to evict (out of 2)	Ruvens; 55% to evict (out of 2)	Manu; 59% to evict (out of 2)	Laura; 52% to evict (out of 2)	Luis; Fewest votes to save (out of 11)	Daniela; 53% to evict (out of 2)	Maica; 50.2% to evict (out of 2)	Jorge; 3% to save (out of 7)	Edi; 6% to save (out of 5)	Violeta; 15% to save (out of 4)	Juan; 53.2% to win (out of 2)	

=== Notes ===
- ^Note 1: The housemates living in the Secret House have a certain connection with some other housemates in the main house or among them. On Day 6, Luis and Violeta entered to the main house with fake names (Diego and Ainara) and playing the fake role that Diego's brother is Ainara's ex-boyfriend.
- ^Note 2: The housemates from the Main House paired each other creating six couples and a single housemate who was Adrián. The six couples are Edi & Elsa, Laura & Manu, "Diego" (Luis) & Nerea, Juan & "Ainara" (Violeta) and Maica & Óscar. Each pair had to nominate together but they could be nominated individually.
- ^Note 3: Edi, Elsa and Manu were the best in the weekly budget test, so they became the Big Bro of the week and were given the power of salvation. They decided to use it on Ruvens.
- ^Note 4: Silvia's secret was discovered by Elsa and for this reason she was fake ejected from the Main House and sent to the Secret House.
- ^Note 5: Special nominations took place this week when housemates answered the phone. Laura was automatically nominated; Violeta received immunity; Maite openly nominated a single housemate with 6 points; Edi vetoed Lucía; Maica lost her ability to nominate; last 3 housemates to nominated Adrián, Luis and Manu had to nominate among them only with 3, 2 or 1 points as they please.
- ^Note 6: Lucía became the Big Bro and obtained the power of salvation, with which she saved herself.
- ^Note 7: All the housemates gathered in the Main House and were all automatically nominated. The public voted for their 17 favourite housemates, therefore the two least voted housemates will be evicted.
- ^Note 8: All 17 housemates had to form trios, and the two left without a third would be automatically nominated. The trios were Adrián/Edi/Juan, Daniela/Maica/Óscar, Laura/Manu/Ruvens, Lucía/Silvia/Vanessa and Luis/Nerea/Violeta, and Javier and Jorge were left alone. Then, each trio had to nominate individual housemates with 3, 2 and 1 points. Javier and Jorge nominated individually.
- ^Note 9: Laura became the Big Bro on week 4 and obtained the power of salvation for the week 5 nominations. She saved herself.
- ^Note 10: Silvia became the Big Bro and obtained the power of salvation after nominations were done. She saved Vanessa.
- ^Note 11: First, the housemates were grouped in pairs (Laura and Manuel; Maica and Daniela; Ruvens and Edi; Óscar and Adrián; Lucía and Nerea; Silvia and Luis; Vanessa and Javier; and Jorge and Violeta). After choosing the couples, they had to decide which member of the couple was nominated and which was saved.
- ^Note 12: Adrián decided to spend €150,000 of his prize (only if he won) on the "extra life" for Juan, who in turn also lost €150,000 of the prize only if he won.
- ^Note 13: Manu became the Big Bro and obtained the power of salvation after nominations were done. He saved Laura.
- ^Note 14: This week the housemates had the power to automatically nominate another housemate but in change, that person would be automatically nominated as well. Jorge won the power and automatically nominated Vanessa but he was also automatically nominated.
- ^Note 15: After winning a challenge, Óscar won immunity, while Ruvens had the power to save a housemates and name another one. He saved Jorge and nominated Lucía.
- ^Note 16: Manu became the Big Bro and obtained the power of salvation after nominations were done. He saved Lucía.
- ^Note 17: After winning a challenge, Daniela and Juan had to decide between them who would receive immunity or an automatic nomination. Daniela was immune and Juan was automatically nominated.
- ^Note 18: Housemates were split into three groups: (1) Edi, Laura, Manu, Óscar, Ruvens; (2) Daniela, Lucía, Maica; and (3) Adrián, Jorge, Juan, Luis, Nerea, Violeta. Each group nominated with 3, 2 and 1 points and not individually.
- ^Note 19: Manu became the Big Bro and obtained the power of salvation after nominations were done. He saved Ruvens.
- ^Note 20: For choosing the correct key (Key 3), Nerea earned the right to automatically nominate a housemate. She chose to nominate Manu for eviction after the nominations were done.
- ^Note 21: Adrián became the Big Bro and obtained the power of salvation after nominations were done. He saved himself.
- ^Note 22: Manu won immunity in a challenge. He has the power to save a nominee and remplace him/her with himself but he decided not too use it.
- ^Note 23: This week, the housemates nominated with basketballs. All of them started with three balls in their basket representing each one 1 point. Each housemate could take three balls from any basket including theirs and putting them in others' baskets. The four housemates with most balls in their baskets are up for eviction this week.
- ^Note 24: This week the public voted to choose the Big Bro. Violeta became the Big Bro as she receive the most votes (58%) and she obtained the power of salvation after nominations were done. She saved herself.
- ^Note 25: This week the housemates could pick randomly among several objects with a hidden power in it. Daniela won the power of being the Big Bro for the rest of the season; Jorge won the power of automatically nominate a housemates forever and he chose Daniela; Juan won the power to veto a housemate forever and he chose Óscar: Manu won the power to bring an evicted housemates to the house, he chose Laura and finally, Edi won the power to automatically evict a housemates, he chose Maica. However, unknown for the housemates, a public voting was open to decide if Maica should stay or not in the house. The public decided that she could stay in the house, she reunited with her fellow housemates when nominations were done.
- ^Note 26: The repechage among the evicted housemates started on Day 71. The four most voted candidates re-entered to the house on Day 74. One of them was re-evicted on Day 76 and finally the two least voted candidates were re-evicted on Day 78.
- ^Note 27: Daniela was the Big Bro and obtained the power of salvation after nominations were done. She saved Óscar.
- ^Note 28: Daniela was automatically nominated as she received that power in week 11 for the rest of the season.
- ^Note 29: Óscar wasn't eligible to nominate as he received that power in week 11 for the rest of the season.
- ^Note 30: Nominations were made by Housemates' relatives.
- ^Note 31: Ruvens was exempt from nominations as he was most voted in the repechage.
- ^Note 32: Daniela was the Big Bro and obtained the power of salvation after nominations were done. She saved Adrián.
- ^Note 33: On Day 85 After Laura's eviction, a flash vote was opened to save among all the housemates. The least voted housemate was evicted.
- ^Note 34: This week housemates had to nominate with three single points (1,1 and 1 points) with eggs. Raw eggs counted as 1 point and boiled eggs as 0 points.
- ^Note 35: There was a hidden blue egg which allowed to nominate with 6 points to a single housemate and also name another extra nominee. Edi picked the blue egg and received these powers.
- ^Note 36: Daniela was the Big Bro and obtained the power of salvation after nominations were done. She saved Maica.
- ^Note 37: Adrián was automatically ejected after intimidating Maica. He was removed from the elimination voting and the eviction tooke place among the rest of nominees.
- ^Note 38: Instead of nominating during the last weeks, a public vote was opened to save among all the housemates before the final week.
- ^Note 39: Public was voting for the winner.

== Total votes and nominations received ==
	Week 1	Week 2	Week 3	Week 4	Week 5	Week 6	Week 7	Week 8	Week 9	Week 10	Week 11	Week 12		Week 13		Week 14	Week 15	Final		Total
Juan	4	7	-	-	7	-	9	-	3	5	1	8	-	0	3	-	-	-	Winner	47
Óscar	8	9	-	-	0	-	-	3	3	1	15	7	-	2	9	-	-	-	Runner-up	57
Ruvens	6	5	0	-	3	-	5	2	3	5	-	-	-	3	9	-	-	-	3rd Place	41
Violeta	-	2	-	-	1	-	1	0	1	3	1	0	-	5	0	-	-	-	Evicted	14
Edi	0	0	0	-	1	-	12	1	0	0	2	11	-	1	2	-	-	Evicted		30
Nerea	2	5	6	-	3	-	2	1	8	2	7	4	-	0	4	-	-	Evicted		44
Jorge	-	-	-	-	-	-	-	0	3	2	7	5	-	2	1	-	Evicted			20
Maica	8	0	0	-	0	-	1	2	9	2	-	5	-	7	12	Evicted				46
Adrián	0	0	5	-	1	-	2	1	10	8	6	10	-	4	8	Ejected				55
Daniela	17	-	-	-	3	-	18	-	10	3	-	-	-	-	Evicted					51
Luis	-	8	18	-	0	-	1	3	9	2	7	1	-	Evicted						49
Laura	9	4	-	-	11	-	5	0	11	-	-	9	Re-Evicted							49
Manu	0	2	3	-	-	-	4	0	8	-	8	Evicted								25
Lucía	-	-	9	-	2	-	10	5	Evicted		-	Re-Evicted								26
Javier	-	-	-	-	-	-	20	Walked												20
Vanessa	9	-	-	-	9	-	-	Evicted			-	Re-Evicted								18
Silvia	-	-	-	-	1	-	Evicted													1
Maite	15	0	2	-	Evicted															17
Elsa	0	0	5	-	Evicted						-	Re-Evicted								5

== Debate: Blind results ==
Week	1stPlace to Evict	2ndPlace to Evict	3rdPlace to Evict	4thPlace to Evict	5thPlace to Evict	6thPlace to Evict	7thPlace to Evict
1	43.0%	42.0%	10.0%	5.0%			
1	52.0%	32.0%	12.0%	4.0%			
2	43.0%	29.0%	14.0%	9.0%	5.0%		
2	41.0%	30.0%	14.0%	10.0%	5.0%		
2	45.0%	33.0%	16.0%	6.0%			
2	42.0%	35.0%	18.0%	5.0%			
2	40.0%	36.0%	19.0%	5.0%			
2	40.0%	39.0%	21.0%				
2	39.7%	38.9%	21.4%				
3	28.0%	25.0%	24.0%	23.0%			
3	29.0%	26.0%	23.0%	22.0%			
3	40.0%	31.0%	29.0%				
3	42.0%	30.0%	28.0%				
4	Not Shown						
5	61.0%	31.0%	6.0%	2.0%			
5	60.0%	25.0%	15.0%				
5	56.0%	29.0%	15.0%				
5	64.0%	36.0%					
5	62.0%	38.0%					
5	60.0%	40.0%					
5	58.0%	42.0%					
6	35.0%	22.0%	19.0%	7.0%	6.0%	6.0%	5.0%
6	44.0%	24.0%	9.0%	8.0%	8.0%	7.0%	
6	46.0%	30.0%	9.0%	8.0%	7.0%		
6	46.0%	30.0%	9.0%	9.0%	6.0%		
6	46.0%	29.0%	10.0%	9.0%	6.0%		
6	52.0%	34.0%	14.0%				
7	57.0%	36.0%	5.0%	2.0%			
7	79.0%	14.0%	7.0%				
7	77.0%	15.0%	8.0%				
7	80.0%	20.0%					
8	49.0%	30.0%	8.0%	7.0%	3.0%	3.0%	
8	62.0%	15.0%	10.0%	9.0%	4.0%		
8	61.0%	16.0%	11.0%	9.0%	3.0%		
8	62.0%	18.0%	11.0%	9.0%			
8	66.0%	21.0%	13.0%				
9	43.0%	27.0%	11.0%	10.0%	5.0%	4.0%	
9	47.0%	29.0%	13.0%	6.0%	5.0%		
9	52.0%	31.0%	12.0%	5.0%			
9	52.0%	30.0%	12.0%	6.0%			
9	56.0%	32.0%	12.0%				
9	56.0%	32.0%	12.0%				
9	63.0%	37.0%					
10	52.0%	16.0%	15.0%	9.0%	8.0%		
10	51.0%	21.0%	19.0%	9.0%			
10	48.0%	24.0%	18.0%	10.0%			
10	52.0%	27.0%	21.0%				
10	50.0%	29.0%	21.0%				
10	58.0%	42.0%					
10	56.0%	44.0%					
10	55.0%	45.0%					
11	37.0%	25.0%	16.0%	10.0%	8.0%	4.0%	
11	40.0%	27.0%	15.0%	10.0%	8.0%		
11	40.0%	27.0%	15.0%	11.0%	7.0%		
11	59.0%	41.0%					
12	46.0%	33.0%	14.0%	7.0%			
12	46.0%	40.0%	14.0%				
12	45.0%	41.0%	14.0%				
12	52.0%	48.0%					
13.1	34.0%	31.0%	22.0%	8.0%	5.0%		
13.1	44.0%	38.0%	18.0%				
13.1	45.0%	40.0%	15.0%				
13.1	46.0%	40.0%	14.0%				
13.1	54.0%	46.0%					
13.1	53.0%	47.0%					
13.2	42.0%	27.0%	25.0%	6.0%			
13.2	49.0%	43.0%	8.0%				
13.2	51.0%	49.0%					
13.2	50.1%	49.9%					
13.2	50.2%	49.8%					
14	30.0%	27.0%	17.0%	12.0%	6.0%	5.0%	3.0%
14	32.0%	26.0%	17.0%	12.0%	5.0%	5.0%	3.0%
14	36.0%	27.0%	16.0%	12.0%	5.0%	4.0%	
14	37.0%	28.0%	17.0%	12.0%	6.0%		
15	39.0%	29.0%	18.0%	14.0%			
15	39.0%	28.0%	18.0%	15.0%			
15	45.0%	34.0%	21.0%				
15	56.5%	43.5%					
15	54.1%	45.9%					
15	53.6%	46.4%					
15	53.5%	46.5%					
15	53.3%	46.7%					

== Repechage ==
On day 71, following Ruvens' elimination and Laura's return through Manu's "Power of Resurrection", a public vote was opened to bring back one of the remaining eliminated housemates: Elsa, Lucía, Maite, Ruvens, Silvia and Vanessa.

Ex-housemate	%	Day of elimination
Ruvens	62%	Gala 21 November 2024
Lucía	38%	Gala 21 November 2024
Elsa	13%	Gala 21 November 2024
Vanessa	3%	Límite 19 November 2024
Maite	N/A	Debate 17 November 2024
Silvia	N/A	Debate 17 November 2024

Notes:

- During the 17 November Debate, the percentages of the least voted candidates were 1% and 2%, but it was not revealed which candidate received each percentage.

== Secret House ==
	Day 1–6	Day 6–8	Day 8–13	Day 13–15	Day 15–20	Day 20–22
Adrián	House					
Daniela	House		Secret; House			
Edi	House					
Elsa	House					
Javier	Secret; House					House
Jorge	Secret; House					House
Juan	House				Secret; House	
Laura	House					
Lucía	Secret; House			House		
Luis	Secret; House	House				
Maica	House					
Maite	House					
Manu	House					
Nerea	House					
Óscar	House				Secret; House	
Ruvens	House					
Silvia	Secret; House			House	Secret; House	
Vanessa	House		Secret; House			
Violeta	Secret; House	House				
