= Gran Hermano (Spanish TV series) season 14 =

Gran Hermano
- Season 14
- Presented by: Mercedes Milá
- No. of days: 128
- No. of housemates: 26
- Winner: Susana Molina
- Runner-up: Igor Basurko
- No. of episodes: 21

Release
- Original network: Telecinco
- Original release: February 11 – June 18, 2013

Season chronology
- ← Previous; Season 13 Next → Season 15

Gran Hermano Catorce (also referred to as Gran Hermano 14) is the fourteenth season of Gran Hermano, the Spanish version of the reality television series franchise Big Brother. The season started airing on 11 February 2013 on Telecinco, and Mercedes Milá is the main host.

On June 20, 2012, after the broadcast of the last debate of Gran Hermano 12+1, the host Mercedes Milá confirmed at the end of the show that there will be the fourteenth season of Gran Hermano. On November 29, 2012, Telecinco there opened the official casting of Gran Hermano 14, since the chain has foreseen the landing of such a season for February 2013. The program announced the distribution of a few cards since them of it recharges of the mobile, so-called "solidary cards " that were distributed by shops, gas stations and kiosks. These cards were granting three persons whose card was containing the word "reward" with the possibility of acceding to the final phase of the casting. A part of the benefits they would be destined for Red Cross.

On Tuesday, 29 January 2013, Mediaset España announced the date of the premiere of the fourteenth season of the show that it started on Monday, 11 February 2013. The motto for this year is "Appear and feel the dizziness ".

== Housemates ==
Housemates	Age	Residence	Occupation	Entered	Exited	Status
Susana Molina	20	Murcia	Business student	Day 1	Day 128	Winner
Igor Basurko	28	San Sebastián	Hockey player	Day 1 Day 88	Day 71; Day 128	10th Evicted
Igor Basurko	28	San Sebastián	Hockey player	Day 1 Day 88	Day 71; Day 128	Runner-up
Desirée Rodriguez	27	Sevilla	Unemployed	Day 36	Day 128	3rd Place
Raquel Martín "Raky"	27	Manresa	Saleswoman	Day 1	Day 128	21st Evicted
Álvaro Vargas	32	Madrid	Cultural promoter	Day 1 Day 78	Day 1 Day 123	Evacuated
Álvaro Vargas	32	Madrid	Cultural promoter	Day 1 Day 78	Day 1 Day 123	20th Evicted
Nacho López	23	Barcelona	Nursing assistant	Day 64	Day 123	19th Evicted
Juan Carlos Sánchez	26	Madrid	Social lunchroom worker	Day 1 Day 88	Day 50; Day 123	7th Evicted
Juan Carlos Sánchez	26	Madrid	Social lunchroom worker	Day 1 Day 88	Day 50; Day 123	18th Evicted
Kristian Gómez	28	Madrid	Football coach	Day 1	Day 116	17th Evicted
Carlos & Gonzalo Montoya	21	Sevilla	Students	Day 29	Day 109	16th Evicted
Sonia Walls	26	Las Palmas	Dentist	Day 1	Day 106	15th Evicted
Saray Roldán	25	Madrid	Unemployed	Day 57	Day 102	14th Evicted
Yéssica Piqueras	24	Valencia	Sports instructor	Day 43	Day 95	13th Evicted
Iván Paniego	24	Madrid	Train car attendant	Day 57	Day 88	12th Evicted
Argi Gastaka	20	Bilbao	Architecture student	Day 1	Day 81	Ejected
Adrián López	25	Sevilla	Child instructor	Day 36	Day 78	11th Evicted
Anabel Cascales	24	Barcelona	Philology student	Day 43	Day 64	9th Evicted
Miriam Cuesta	24	Alicante	Hairdresser	Day 3 Day 88	Day 57; Day 95	8th Evicted
Noelia Fernández	20	Gijón	Horse rider	Day 1	Day 43	6th Evicted
Iván Gonzalo	26	Alicante	Performer	Day 1	Day 36	5th Evicted
Daniel Padilla "Danny"	31	Almeria	DJ	Day 1	Day 36	Ejected
Leticia Serrano	24	Madrid	Elementary teacher	Day 15	Day 29	4th Evicted
Eva Guijarro	20	Almeria	Nursing assistant	Day 22	Day 25	Ejected
Edoardo Boscolo	22	Venice	Physiotherapist student	Day 8 Day 88	Day 22; Day 95	3rd Evicted
Lorena Edo	30	Valencia	Nail Stylist	Day 1	Day 15	2nd Evicted
Giulia Tortella "Giuls"	21	Ibiza	Waitress	Day 1 Day 88	Day 8 Day 95	1st Evicted

=== Adrián ===
Adrián López is a 25-year-old sports instructor from Sevilla. He entered the house on Day 36 with Desirée, and lived with her in 'the other house'; one week later, they were incorporated into the official house. He liked Yessica. He was the eleventh housemate to be evicted with 66.4% of public votes on Day 78.

=== Álvaro ===
Álvaro Vargas is a 32-year-old cultural manager from Madrid. Álvaro fell off the zipline while entering the house and was taken to the hospital. He returns in the house on Day 78. He was the twentieth housemate to be evicted, receiving the fewest votes against Desireé, Igor, Raki and Susana on Day 123.

=== Anabel ===
Anabel Cascales is a 24-year-old philology student from Barcelona. She entered the house on Day 43 with Yessica, and lived with her in 'the other house'; one week later, they were incorporated into the official house. She was the ninth housemate to be evicted with 54.3% of public votes on Day 64.

Anabel Cascales se dedica a la música desde hace años. Ha publicado varias canciones en YouTube y compagina su pasión con otras actividades. Es también profesora de inglés y animadora sociocultural y turística. Actualmente mantiene una posición muy discreta con respecto a la fama.

=== Argi ===
Argi Gastaka is a 20-year-old architecture student from Bilbao. She was surprised to learn that she was entering the house on Day 1. She was considered a front runner to win, but she was ejected on Day 81 for her previous joke involving the ETA, which she later apologized for.

=== Carlos & Gonzalo ===
Carlos and Gonzalo Montoya are 21-year-old twins from Sevilla. They entered the house on Day 29 and they recognized that they had a friendship with Argi. At first, one of them lived in the official house and traded with the other, who lived in the other house. His housemates could not discover them. Kristian was helping in the mission. Weeks later, Gonzalo started a relationship with Susana. They were the 16th housemates to be evicted with 59.3% of public votes on Day 109.

=== Danny ===
Daniel Padilla (Danny) is a 31-year-old DJ from Almería. His father is a famous communist in southern Spain. He entered the house on Day 1 and was ejected on Day 36 for violating the rules of the show.

=== Desireé ===
Desireé Rodríguez is a 27-year-old unemployed beautician from Umbrete. She entered the house on Day 36 with Adrián, and lived with him in 'the other house'; one week later, they were incorporated into the official house. She was the third finalist with 19.2% of public votes to win, on Day 128.

=== Edoardo ===
Edoardo Boscolo is a 22-year-old physiotherapist from Venice, Italy but lives in Madrid. He entered the house on Day 8. He was the third evicted with 42.9% of public votes on Day 22. He re-entered the house as a guest on day 29 and left the house on Day 36 at the end of Kristian's task. In the repechage, he was the fourth most voted to re-enter the House, with 11.6% of the public vote. But, he didn't win a place in the House as an official housemate, being the third most voted to re-enter the House, with 16.96% of the public vote on Day 95.

=== Eva ===
Eva Guijarro is a 20-year nursing assistant from Almería and Danny's girlfriend. She entered the house on Day 22. She was ejected on Day 25 as she didn't keep well in secret that she was Danny's girlfriend.

=== Giuls ===
Giulia "Giuls" Tortella is a 21-year-old Waitress from Ibiza. She entered the house on Day 1. She was the first housemate to be evicted with 44.9% of public votes on Day 8. In the repechage, she was the third most voted to re-enter the House, with 18.7% of the public vote. But, she didn't win a place in the House as an official housemate, being the second most voted to re-enter the House, with 30.4% of the public vote on Day 95.

=== Igor ===
Igor Basurko is a 28-year-old inline hockey player from San Sebastián. He entered the house on Day 1. He was the tenth housemate to be evicted with 38.6% of public votes on Day 71. In the repechage, he was the second most voted to re-enter the House, with 22.7% of public vote. He won a place in the House as an official housemate, being the most voted to re-enter the House, with 44.76% of the public vote on Day 95. He finished as Runner-Up, with 47.2% of the public vote against Susana, the winner.

=== Iván G. ===
Iván Gonzalo is a 26-year-old dancing instructor, singer and imitator from Alicante. He entered the house on Day 1. He was the fifth housemate to be evicted with 65.4% of public votes on Day 36.

=== Iván P. ===
Iván Paniego is 24 years old. He is from Madrid and entered on Day 57. He is Saray's ex-boyfriend. He was the twelfth housemate to be evicted with 45.4% of public votes on Day 88. (in second position was his ex-girlfriend Saray with 42.7% of votes).

=== Juan Carlos ===
Juan Carlos Sánchez is a 26-year-old child educator from Madrid. He is the first stammering contestant Big Brother Spain. He entered the house on Day 1. He was the seventh housemate to be evicted with 50.34% of public votes on Day 50. In the repechage, he was the most voted to re-enter the House, with 25.1% of the public vote. He won a place in the House as an official housemate, being the most voted by the current housemates. He was the eighteenth housemate to be evicted with 56.95% of public vote on Day 123.

=== Kristian ===
Kristian Gómez is a 28-year-old football trainer from Madrid. He entered the house on Day 1. He was the seventeenth housemate to be evicted with 63.4% of public votes on Day 116 after being nominated by the program because he didn't cut her hair after he had had a dinner and one hour without cameras with Sonia.

=== Leticia ===
Leticia Serrano is a 24-year -ld elementary teacher. She entered the house on Day 15, because she was picked by 12–0 vote to stay in the house over Pili. She was the fourth housemate to be evicted with 53.3% of public votes on Day 29 after being nominated by the program after not fulfill the mission of protecting the identity of Eva.

=== Lorena ===
Lorena Edo is a 30-year -ld from Valencia. She entered the house on Day 1. She had overweight She was the second housemate to be evicted with 50.7% of public votes on Day 15.

=== Miriam ===
Miriam Cuesta is a 24-year-old hairdresser from Alicante. She is a survivor of the Costa Concordia disaster. She entered the house on Day 3, because she was picked by Kristian to stay in the house over Dobromira. She was nominated by the program on Day 25 after not fulfilling the mission of protecting the identity of Eva. She was the eighth housemate to be evicted with 42.9% of public votes on Day 57. In the repechage, she was chosen by the current housemates to return to the House. But, she did not win a place in the House as an official housemate, being the fourth most voted to re-enter the House, with 7.88% of the public vote on Day 95.

=== Nacho ===
Nacho Lopez is a 23-year-old nursing assistant and basketball player (his height is 2.12 meters) from Barcelona. He entered the House on Day 64 and is the last new housemate to enter the House. He was the nineteenth housemate to be evicted, receiving the fewest votes against Álvaro, Desireé, Igor, Raki and Susana on Day 123.

=== Noelia ===
Noelia Fernández is a 20-year-old teaching student from Gijón. She entered the house on Day 1. She was the sixth housemate to be evicted with 60.9% of public votes on Day 43.

=== Raki ===
Raquel Martin (Raki) is a 27-year-old commercial adviser from Manresa. Dolo is her mother. She entered the house on Day 1. She was the twenty-first housemate to be evicted with 11.2% of the public vote to win on Day 128.

=== Saray ===
Saray Roldan is 25 years old, is unemployed, and is from Madrid. She entered the house on Day 57. She is Ivan P.'s ex-girlfriend. She was the 14th housemate to be evicted with 59.9% of public votes on Day 102.

=== Sonia ===
Sonia Walls is a 26-year-old dentist from Gran Canaria. She entered the house on Day 1. She developed a relationship with Kristian. After Argi's ejection she was considered a contender to win, but she was the 15th housemate to be evicted with 52.2% of public votes in a very close eviction with Igor on Day 106. The public nominated her with an app.

=== Susana ===
Susana Ann Molina is a 20-year-old business student from Murcia. She entered the house on Day 1. She started a relationship with Gonzalo months later. She is the winner of Gran Hermano 14, with 52.8% of the public vote against Igor, the runner-up.

=== Yéssica ===
Yéssica Piqueras is a 24-year-old sports instructor from Valencia. She entered the house on Day 43 with Anabel, and lived with her in 'the other house'; one week later, they were incorporated into the official house.. She was the 13th housemate to be evicted on Day 95.

== Nominations table ==
	Week 1	Week 2	Week 3	Week 4	Week 5	Week 6	Week 7	Week 8	Week 9	Week 10	Week 11	Week 12	Week 13	Week 14	Week 15		Week 16	Week 17		Week 18		
	Week 1	Week 2	Week 3	Week 4	Week 5	Week 6	Week 7	Week 8	Week 9	Week 10	Week 11	Week 12	Week 13	Week 14	Day 102	Day 106	Week 16	Day 116	Day 123	Day 128	Final	
Susana	Giuls; Raki	Raki; Miriam	Edoardo; Igor	~~Iván G.~~; Juan Carlos	Iván G. Juan Carlos	Juan Carlos	Juan Carlos; Sonia	Carlos & Gonzalo; Miriam	Anabel	1-Iván P. ~~3-Yéssica~~	Iván P. Adrián	Argi; Carlos & Gonzalo	Nacho; Yéssica	Nacho; Desireé	Nacho; Igor	Nacho; Kristian	Nacho; Igor	Nacho; Juan Carlos	No; Nominations	No; Nominations	Winner (Day 128)	
Igor	Lorena; Argi	Lorena; Iván G.	Edoardo; Susana	~~Iván G.~~; Danny	Iván G. Susana	Susana	Susana; Juan Carlos	Miriam; Carlos & Gonzalo	Anabel	~~1-Adrián~~; 2-Adrián	Evicted (Day 71)		Secret; Room	Exempt	Sonia; Carlos & Gonzalo	Carlos & Gonzalo; Juan Carlos	Juan Carlos; Desireé	Desireé; Juan Carlos	No; Nominations	No; Nominations	Runner-Up (Day 128)	
Desireé	Not in House					Secret; Room	Exempt	Igor; Carlos & Gonzalo	Anabel	~~3-Yéssica~~; ~~2-Argi~~	Argi; Nacho	Kristian; Raki	Nacho; Carlos & Gonzalo	Carlos & Gonzalo; Nacho	Carlos & Gonzalo; Nacho	Carlos & Gonzalo; Nacho	Igor; Nacho	Igor; Nacho	No; Nominations	No; Nominations	Third place (Day 128)	
Raki	Argi; Noelia	Miriam; Susana	Edoardo; Argi	Danny; ~~Leticia~~	Argi; Noelia	Noelia	Argi; Carlos & Gonzalo	Igor; Carlos & Gonzalo	Anabel	~~1-Adrián~~; ~~2-Saray~~	Adrián; Saray	Sonia; Kristian	Nacho; Yéssica	Nacho; Álvaro	Nacho; Álvaro	Nacho; Álvaro	Álvaro; Nacho	Álvaro; Desireé	No; Nominations	No; Nominations	Evicted (Day 128)	
Álvaro	Injured (Day 1–78)											Exempt	Carlos & Gonzalo; Saray	Carlos & Gonzalo; Saray	Carlos & Gonzalo; Sonia	Juan Carlos; Carlos & Gonzalo	Juan Carlos; Raki	Juan Carlos; Raki	No; Nominations	Evicted (Day 123)		
Nacho	Not in House									Exempt	Saray; Adrián	Kristian; Sonia	Saray; Desireé	Desireé; Saray	Desireé; Carlos & Gonzalo	Desireé; Raki	Desireé; Raki	Desireé; Susana	No; Nominations	Evicted (Day 123)		
Juan Carlos	Raki; Giuls	Igor; Lorena	Edoardo; Susana	Danny; ~~Leticia~~	Argi; Susana	Susana	Argi; Miriam	Evicted (Day 50)					Secret; Room	Exempt	Igor; Álvaro	Álvaro; Igor	Igor; Álvaro	Desireé; Susana	Re-Evicted (Day 123)			
Kristian	Lorena; Argi	Lorena; Miriam	Miriam; Edoardo	Not; Eligible	Secret; Room	Susana	Susana; Argi	Miriam; Carlos & Gonzalo	Anabel	~~3-Saray~~; ~~1-Saray~~	Desireé; Nacho	Sonia; Raki	Nacho; Saray	Nacho; Saray	Igor; Nacho	Igor; Álvaro	Igor; Desireé	Evicted (Day 116)				
Carlos & Gonzalo	Not in House				Exempt	Noelia	Argi; Juan Carlos	Igor; Miriam	Nominated	~~3-Argi~~; 2-Argi	Argi; Yéssica	Iván P. Susana	Álvaro; Yéssica	Desireé; Nacho	Igor; Desireé	Desireé; Igor	Evicted (Day 109)					
Sonia	Giuls; Argi	Argi; Danny	Argi; Danny	Danny; ~~Leticia~~	Iván G. Susana	Juan Carlos	Susana; Argi	Carlos & Gonzalo; Igor	Susana	~~1-Susana~~; 2-Saray	Iván P. Yéssica	Raki; Kristian	Yéssica; Saray	Susana; Saray	Igor; Álvaro	Evicted (Day 106)						
Saray	Not in House								Exempt	~~2-Adrián~~; ~~3-Iván P.~~	Nacho; Adrián	Yéssica; Kristian	Nacho; Álvaro	Desireé; Nacho	Evicted (Day 102)							
Yéssica	Not in House						Secret; Room	Exempt	Desireé	1-Iván P. ~~2-Adrián~~	Adrián; Nacho	Saray; Raki	Carlos & Gonzalo; Susana	Evicted (Day 95)								
Iván P.	Not in House								Exempt	~~2-Igor~~; ~~2-Igor~~	Yéssica; Nacho	Carlos & Gonzalo; Kristian	Evicted (Day 88)									
Argi	Giuls; Raki	Miriam; Igor	Iván G. Kristian	~~Iván G.~~; Danny	Iván G. Raki	Juan Carlos	Juan Carlos; Sonia	Miriam; Carlos & Gonzalo	Desireé	~~2-Desireé~~; ~~2-Desireé~~	Desireé; Iván P.	Susana; Kristian	Ejected (Day 81)									
Adrián	Not in House					Secret; Room	Exempt	Igor; Miriam	Anabel	~~2-Igor~~; 2-Igor	Yéssica; Nacho	Evicted (Day 78)										
Anabel	Not in House						Secret; Room	Exempt	Susana	Evicted (Day 64)												
Miriam	Exempt	Lorena; Argi	Argi; Susana	~~Leticia~~; Danny	Argi; Juan Carlos	Juan Carlos	Argi; Susana	Igor; Carlos & Gonzalo	Evicted (Day 57)				Secret; Room	Re-Evicted (Day 95)								
Noelia	Giuls; Raki	Raki; Kristian	Raki; Danny	Leticia	Raki; Susana	Raki	Evicted (Day 43)															
Iván G.	Lorena; Giuls	Lorena; Argi	Argi; Susana	~~Leticia~~; Argi	Argi; Igor	Evicted (Day 36)																
Danny	Noelia; Juan Carlos	Miriam; Argi	Edoardo; Argi	~~Leticia~~; Miriam	Argi; Raki	Ejected (Day 36)																
Leticia	Not in House		Exempt	~~Iván G.~~; Juan Carlos	Evicted (Day 29)																	
Eva	Not in House			Exempt	Ejected (Day 25)																	
Edoardo	Not in House	Exempt	Juan Carlos; Iván G.	Evicted (Day 22)	Guest	Evicted (Day 22)							Secret; Room	Re-Evicted (Day 95)								
Lorena	Igor; Giuls	Igor; Miriam	Evicted (Day 15)																			
Giuls	Noelia; Argi	Evicted (Day 8)											Secret; Room	Re-Evicted (Day 95)								
Nominations Notes	1, 2	3	4	5, 6, 7	7	8	9	10	11, 12, 13	14	none	15	16	none	17	none	18	none	19	20	none	
Nominated for eviction	Argi; Giuls; Raki	Igor; Lorena; Miriam	Argi; Edoardo; Susana	Danny; Juan Carlos; Leticia	Argi; ~~Danny~~; Iván G. Miriam; Susana	Juan Carlos; Noelia; Susana	Argi; Juan Carlos; Susana	Carlos & Gonzalo; Igor; Miriam	Anabel; Carlos & Gonzalo; Desireé; Yéssica	Adrián; Argi; Igor; Iván P. Saray	Adrián; Nacho; Yéssica	~~Argi~~; Desireé; Iván P. Nacho; Saray; Yéssica	Carlos & Gonzalo; Nacho; Yéssica	Desireé; Nacho; Saray	Carlos & Gonzalo; Igor; Nacho; Sonia	Álvaro; Carlos & Gonzalo; Igor; Nacho	Desireé; Igor; Kristian; Nacho	Desireé; Juan Carlos; Nacho; Susana	Álvaro; Desireé; Igor; Nacho; Raki; Susana	Desireé; Igor; Raki; Susana	Desireé; Igor; Susana	
Injured	Álvaro											none										
Ejected	none			Eva	Danny	none						Argi	none									
Evicted	Giuls; 44.9% to evict	Lorena; 50.7% to evict	Edoardo; 42.9% to evict	Leticia; 53.3% to evict	Iván G. 65.4% to evict	Noelia; 60.9% to evict	Juan Carlos; 50.34% to evict	Miriam; 42.9% to evict	Anabel; 54.3% to evict	Igor; 38.6% to evict	Adrián; 66.4% to evict	Iván P. 45.4% to evict	Yéssica; 60% to evict	Saray; 59.9% to evict	Sonia; 52.2% to evict	Carlos & Gonzalo; 59.3% to evict	Kristian; 63.4% to evict	Juan Carlos; 56.95% to evict	Álvaro; Fewest votes to save (out of 5)	Raki; 11.2% to save	Desireé; 19.2% to win (out of 3)	Igor; 47.2% to win (out of 2)
Evicted	Giuls; 44.9% to evict	Lorena; 50.7% to evict	Edoardo; 42.9% to evict	Leticia; 53.3% to evict	Iván G. 65.4% to evict	Noelia; 60.9% to evict	Juan Carlos; 50.34% to evict	Miriam; 42.9% to evict	Anabel; 54.3% to evict	Igor; 38.6% to evict	Adrián; 66.4% to evict	Iván P. 45.4% to evict	Yéssica; 60% to evict	Saray; 59.9% to evict	Sonia; 52.2% to evict	Carlos & Gonzalo; 59.3% to evict	Kristian; 63.4% to evict	Juan Carlos; 56.95% to evict	Nacho; Fewest votes to save (out of 6)	Raki; 11.2% to save	Susana; 52.8% to win	

=== Notes ===
- ^Note 1: During Week 1, Alvaro was exempt from nominations because he had to leave the House on Day 1 to be operating in the hospital after a fall at his entrance into the house. He is not eligible and immune.
- ^Note 2: On Day 3, Kristian had to choose between two aspirants: Dobromira and Miriam, to enter in the house. He decided to pick Miriam.
- ^Note 3: As he is a new housemate, Edoardo can save one of the nominee. Argi, Lorena and Miriam were the original nominees and he decided to save Argi from the nomination, so Igor became a nominee too.
- ^Note 4: On Day 15, the housemates had to choose between two aspirants: Leticia and Pili, to enter in the house. With 12–0 votes, Leticia was picked.
- ^Note 5: Eva is Danny's girlfriend. She, Danny, Leticia and Miriam must not reveal that. If they pass in that task, Eva will be official housemate. If they fail the task, Eva will leave the House and Danny, Leticia and Miriam will be automatically nominated.
- ^Note 6: The housemates nominated according to the random balls that each housemate drew by lot. Noelia won the power to automatically nominate a housemate. She nominated Leticia and all other votes against her were voided. Iván won an immunity and all votes against him were voided. Kristian did not nominate.
- ^Note 7: Eva has been ejected for not well-keeping her secret. So, Danny, Leticia and Miriam are automatically up for eviction.
- ^Note 8: Argi and Carlos/Gonzalo were immune for Nomination after succeeding the Twin's task.
- ^Note 9: Desireé and Andrián are immune for Nomination after succeeding their task.
- ^Note 10: Families had to nominate for their child, brother, sister, friend, boyfriend, girlfriend.
- ^Note 11: Carlos and Gonzalo are automatically nominated during Week 9 for having a violent behavior.
- ^Note 12: The team from the orange envelope had to choose one of the other group to automatically nominate, they decided to nominate automatically Yessica.
- ^Note 13: The team from the blue envelope had to save one of the nominees, they decided to save Susana.
- ^Note 14: Housemates have the opportunity to vote with 3, 2 or 1 point. They have to shoot the basketball hoop to be able to nominate. If they fail, their votes to nominate are cancelled automatically. If none of the housemates is able to shoot at least one point, that would be mean all the votes are cancelled and all the housemates will be up for eviction. It is also announced that if there are not three nominees at the minimum, all the housemates will be up for eviction.
- ^Note 15: Housemates had to nominate the two housemates they want to see in the final, which means they have to nominate positively.
- ^Note 16: One of the nominees between Nacho, Saray and Yessica will be saved from the nomination by the Super Villain group, and will be replaced by another who has the most votes to nominate. The Super Villain group has decided to save Saray, so Carlos/Gonzalo are nominated in her place.
- ^Note 17: Sonia was automatically nominated by popular vote with 72.62%.
- ^Note 18: Kristian was automatically nominated for not complying with the punishment of Sonia's wish.
- ^Note 19: Last eviction decide to votes for save between six ultimate housemates and evict two housemates with the fewest votes.
- ^Note 20: Last eviction decide to votes for save between four ultimate housemates and evict one housemate with the fewest votes.

== Nominations totals received ==
	Week 1	Week 2	Week 3	Week 4	Week 5	Week 6	Week 7	Week 8	Week 9	Week 10	Week 11	Week 12	Week 13	Week 14	Week 15		Week 16	Week 17		Week 18	Final	Total
Susana	0	1	4	0	4	3	4	0	2	0	0	2	1	1	0	0	0	2	–	–	Winner	20
Igor	1	3	1	0	1	0	0	6	0	2	Evicted			–	5	3	4	1	–	–	Runner-Up	27
Desireé	Not in House					–		0	2	0	2	0	1	4	2	2	3	4	–	–	3rd Place	20
Raki	4	2	1	0	3	1	0	0	0	0	0	4	0	0	0	1	2	1	–	–	Evicted	11
Álvaro	Injured											–	2	1	3	3	2	1	–	Evicted		12
Nacho	Not in House									–	6	0	5	6	4	3	3	2	–	Evicted		29
Juan Carlos	1	0	1	2	2	4	4	Evicted						–	0	2	2	3	Evicted			21
Kristian	0	1	1	0	–	0	0	0	0	0	0	7	0	0	0	1	–	Evicted				–4
Carlos/Gonzalo	Not in House				–		1	8	–	0	0	2	3	2	4	3	Evicted					19
Sonia	0	0	0	0	0	0	2	0	0	0	0	3	0	0	2	Evicted						1
Saray	Not in House								–	2	2	1	4	4	Evicted							11
Yéssica	Not in House						–		0	0	4	1	4	Evicted								7
Iván P.	Not in House								–	2	3	1	Evicted									4
Argi	5	4	5	1	5	–	6	0	0	2	2	1	Ejected									29
Adrián	Not in House					–		0	0	2	5	Evicted										7
Anabel	Not in House						–		6	Evicted												6
Miriam	–	6	1	1	–	0	1	6	Evicted													15
Noelia	3	0	0	0	1	2	Evicted															6
Iván G.	0	1	2	4	4	Evicted																11
Danny	0	1	2	6	–	Ejected																9
Leticia	Not in House		–	7	Evicted																	7
Eva	Not in House			–	Ejected																	0
Edoardo	Not	–	6	Evicted																		6
Lorena	3	5	Evicted																			8
Giuls	7	Evicted																				7

Automatically nominated.
Saved after nominations were made.
Not Eligible to be up for eviction (immune).

== Debate : Blind results ==
Week	1stPlace to Evict	2ndPlace to Evict	3rdPlace to Evict	4thPlace to Evict	5thPlace to Evict	Person in Last Place
1	Not Shown					
2	56.6%	26.8%	16.6%			Miriam
3	45.8%	29.4%	24.8%			Not Shown
4	Not Shown					
5	82.9%	9.3%	5.1%	1.9%	0.8%	Not Shown
6	61.9%	29.4%	8.7%			Not Shown
7	56.4%	34.6%	9.0%			Not Shown
8	48.6%	29.1%	22.3%			Not Shown
9	51.69%	39.83%	5.01%	3.47%		Yéssica
10	?%	?%	?%	?%	3.36%	Saray
11	67.3%	19.5%	13.2%			Not Shown
12	43.7%	42.8%	6.3%	4.2%	3.0%	Yéssica
13	54.8%	37.6%	7.6%			Not Shown
14	64.2%	18.7%	17.1%			Not Shown
14	56.06%	42.76%	0.82%	0.36%		Twins or Nacho
15	56.8%	40.8%	2.1%	0.3%		Álvaro or Nacho
16	51.5%	46.7%	0.9%	0.9%		Desireé or Nacho
17	62.08%	19.08%	9.45%	9.39%		Not Shown
18	33%	33%	21%	13%		Not Shown

== Twists ==
=== The Wheel (New Housemates) ===
In each week, two aspirants to be an official housemate will be in the wheel. A housemate or several housemates will choose who enters and who goes.

- Week 1 - After pass the task to put all housemates inside the House on Day 1, Mercedes said that Kristian that he will have a reward. On Day 3, Kristian went to eviction room, and had the power to select one of the aspirants. The candidates were Miriam and Dobromira. He decided to pick Miriam, so Dobromira left the House.
- Week 3 - On Day 15, Leticia and Pili were in the wheel. In the living room, all housemates saw their presentations. One by one, the housemates went to diary room to nominate and then they have to select one of them. Leticia and Pili were in Diary Room and saw all nominations. Leticia was picked by a 12–0 vote, so Pili left the House.

==== Two in one ====
- Week 2 - On Day 8, instead of have two aspirants, on this week there was only one. His name is Edoardo and is Italian. He has to do him and his "fake" brother (Francesco). If Raki and Argi (who will "fake" select) don't discover that he is only one, he will be official housemate. Raki and Argi don't discovered, so he is official housemate.

==== New Identity ====
- Week 4 - On Day 22, the housemates who were selected in the Wheel (Miriam, Edoardo and Leticia) were called to the eviction room. They were informed that they will select the next housemate. But, that wasn't true. Eva, Danny's girlfriend, joined them in the eviction room. Then, Mercedes explained that she is Danny's girlfriend and that should be secret. Her new identity is Ana. Miriam, Edoardo, Leticia and Danny will be her accomplices. If they pass the task, Eva will be official housemate. If they fail the task, Eva will left the House, and Edoardo, Miriam, Leticia and Danny will be automatically nominated. They fail the task, so on Day 25, Eva was ejected from the House. As Edoardo and Leticia were already evicted, only Miriam and Danny were automatically nominated.

==== The twins ====
- Week 5 - On Day 29, Argi was called to eviction room. Then, Gonzalo joined her. Mercedes explained that Gonzalo have a twin brother. They will swap positions several times a day and Argi will be their accomplice. The other twin, who isn't in the House, will be in a Secret Room, with Kristian (See Fake Repechage). If they pass the task, Argi and Carlos/Gonzalo will be immune. If they fail the task, Argi and Carlos/Gonzalo will be automatically nominated. They pass the pask, so they're immune for Week 6 nominations.

==== Thieves ====
- Week 6 - On Day 36, Desireé and Adrián entered in a Secret Room. Then, Mercedes explained that, during the week, they will steal things of the House. They can't be discovered. The first steal was in that night. All housemates were put on Diary Room and Gran Hermano said to them that they had a technical problem with a camera. They had 2 minutes to steal a reclining chair. They steal in least of 2 minutes, so they weren't discovered. Rewards and punishments and still unknown.

==== Teachers ====
- Week 7 - On Day 43, Anabel and Yéssica entered in a Secret Room. Mercedes explained that they have to act as if they were the housemate's singing teacher. They have to believe to the others that they are only for the task. But in reality, the other housemates know about their real role, and they have to make them believe that they believe them if Anabel and Yéssica discover it, they will be punishment for them. There will be a reward for whoever finishes in first place in the ranking of Anabel and Yéssica. Juan Carlos finished in first place, but, because he was the evicted. So Carlos, who finished in second place, won the reward. The reward is still unknown.

==== Ex-couple ====
- Week 9 - On Day 57, Iván P. and Saray entered the House. They are an ex-couple. Mercedes say to five housemates go to the Blue Group (Saray's one) and the other five go to the Orange Group (Iván P.'s one). Carlos/Gonzalo were not eligible to choose a group, as they are automatically nominated. The Blue Group (Adrián, Anabel, Argi, Susana and Yéssica) and the Orange Group (Desireé, Igor, Kristian, Raki and Sonia) were the groups. Each Group had to the Diary Room to nominate. At the end, Mercedes asked Iván P. to open his envelope. The envelope say that his group (Orange) had to automatically nominate a housemate. They nominated Yéssica. Then, Mercedes asked Saray to open her envelope. The envelope say that her group (Blue) can save one of the nominees. They decided to save Susana.

==== Basketball ====
- Week 10 - On Day 64, Nacho, the last new housemate, entered the House. This week, they have to nominate in a basketball "game". They would have two shoots, one from the housemate, and the other from Nacho. They only can nominate if they shoot inside the basketball hoop. There are three stations, one for 1 point, one for 2 points, and the other for 3 points, with a little distance between them, and they nominate according to the points that they chosen. If there aren't at least 3 nominees, they would be all automatically nominated. They shoot 6 times into the basketball hoop. In the housemates, only Susana and Yessica shoot into the basketball hoop. Nacho shoot 4 times into the basketball hoop.

=== Fake Repechage ===
On Day 25, Kristian asked one wish for the Gran Hache, to have Edoardo in the House again. On Day 29, Kristian was called to eviction room. He saw Edoardo entering the House. Mercedes explained that for his wish be true, he need to left the House. He left. When he was in the studio, Mercedes revealed to him that was a fake eviction. He will return to the House, but he go to a Secret Room and will be accomplice of the twins (See The twins). On Day 36, Edoardo and Sonia were called to eviction room. Mercedes explained to them that Kristian was fake evicted, and Edoardo's return was fake. So, he left the House. Then, Kristian returned to the House.

=== Family's nominations ===
On Day 50, each housemate, exempt Anabel and Yessica, had the opportunity to call a familiar or a friend by phone. The familiar or friend that they called nominated instead of them. The housemates not know that. At the end, Carlos/Gonzalo, Igor and Miriam were nominated by all familiars and friends. Nobody nominated other housemate. On Day 57, before the eviction, the production showed to the nominees in the eviction room, why they were nominated.

=== Repechage ===
The public voting will decide the top ex-housemates to officially return to the Gran Hermano house as official housemates.

The repechage was officially announced on Day 78 (29 April 2013). All the evicted housemates (Giuls, Lorena, Edoardo, Leticia, Iván G., Noelia, Juan Carlos, Miriam, Anabel, Igor and Adrián) are there. Five housemates were finalists, and re-entered the house on 9 May: Four chosen by the viewers (Juan Carlos, Igor, Giuls and Edoardo), and the other chosen by the current housemates (Miriam). They are currently living in the Apartment (Secret Room or House 2).

Ex-housemate	%	Elimination's Day
Juan Carlos	25.1%	Finalist by public
Igor	22.7%	Finalist by public
Giuls	18.7%	Finalist by public
Edoardo	11.6%	Finalist by public
Miriam	3.1%	Finalist by housemates
Leticia	7.3%	Gala 9 May 2013
Lorena	4.8%	Gala 9 May 2013
Noelia	3.7%	Gala 9 May 2013
Adrián	3.0%	Debate 7 May 2013
Iván G.	1.04%	Debate 2 May 2013
Anabel	0.56%	Debate 2 May 2013

On Day 95, the housemates voted for who should re-enter in the House.

Ex-housemate	Votes	Voted by...
Juan Carlos	4	Nacho, Kristian, Saray and Raki
Giuls	3	Susana, Yessica and Álvaro
Miriam	2	Sonia and Desireé
Edoardo	1	Carlos/Gonzalo
Igor	0	–

Then, the public voted for who should re-enter, between the restants.

Ex-housemate	%
Igor	44.76%
Giuls	30.40%
Edoardo	16.96%
Miriam	7.88%

=== Super-Villains and Super-Heroes ===
On Day 78, they had a new task. The housemates were split in two teams: the Super-Villains (Susana, Desireé, Sonia, Carlos/Gonzalo and Saray) and the Super-Heroes (Nacho, Kristian, Iván P., Yéssica, Raki and Argi). Álvaro was the host of the task. The team who won the task, will have a special power in the nominations of Day 88. After Argi's ejection, Desireé was chosen to be the other host. So, the teams were: the Super-Villains (Saray, Sonia, Susana and Carlos/Gonzalo) and the Super-Heroes (Kristian, Nacho, Raki, Yéssica and Iván P.). The Super-Villains team (Saray, Sonia, Susana and Carlos/Gonzalo) won the task, and won the power to save one of the nominees. They chose to save Saray, meaning that Carlos/Gonzalo, who had the next highest nominations with 3, were now up for eviction.

=== Public nomination ===
On Day 102, for the first time ever in Gran Hermano history, the public did a nomination. After the housemates votes, the housemates who weren't chosen by the housemates could be nominated by the viewers. The public can nominate in an application of Gran Hermano. Sonia received the most votes, and was nominated.

Housemate	Votes	%
Sonia	62.143 votes	72.62%
Álvaro	8.323 votes	9.73%
Susana	7.793 votes	9.1%
Desireé	2.594 votes	3.03%
Kristian	2.377 votes	2.78%
Juan Carlos	1.675 votes	1.96%
Raki	666 votes	0.78%
Total	85.571 votes	100%

=== Kristian nomination ===
On Day 109, Sonia asked a wish to Gran Hache, to have a dinner with Kristian in the secret room. For that to happen she will have to cut Kristian's hair. If Kristian refuses to cut it, or if Sonia refuses to cut is hair, Kristian will be automatically nominated. Sonia was starting cutting his hair, when Kristian refused to cut it, so he is automatically nominated.

== Ratings ==
=== "Galas" ===
- On Mondays (February 11 to April 29) and on Thursdays (May 9).

Show N°	Day	Viewers	Ratings share
1 - Launch	Monday, February 11	3.061.000	19,3%
2	Wednesday, February 13	2.673.000	19,9%
3	Monday, February 18	2.474.000	18,0%
4	Monday, February 25	2.334.000	16,5%
5	Monday, March 4	2.506.000	16,5%
6	Monday, March 11	2.512.000	17,5%
7	Monday, March 18	2.694.000	18,9%
8	Monday, March 25	2.386.000	17,0%
9	Monday, April 1	2.788.000	19,4%
10	Monday, April 8	2.970.000	20,8%
11	Monday, April 15	2.707.000	20,1%
12	Monday, April 22	2.636.000	19,5%
13	Monday, April 29	2.305.000	16,9%
14	Thursday, May 9	2.540.000	18,7%
15	Thursday, May 16	2.438.000	18,5%
16	Thursday, May 23	2.224.000	17,0%
17	Monday, May 27	2.451.000	17,6%
18	Thursday, May 30	2.495.000	18,1%
19	Thursday, June 6	2.491.000	18,8%
20	Thursday, June 13	2.275.000	17,6%
21 - Final	Tuesday, June 18	3.051.000	20,7%

=== "El Debate" ===
Show N°	Day	Viewers	Ratings share
1	Wednesday, February 20	1.130.000	18,9%
2	Wednesday, February 27	1.037.000	13,8%
3	Thursday, March 7	1.667.000	20,0%
4	Thursday, March 14	1.371.000	17,1%
5	Thursday, March 21	1.276.000	20,6%
6	Thursday, March 28	1.232.000	13,2%
7	Thursday, April 4	1.860.000	23,5%
8	Thursday, April 11	1.486.000	21,3%
9	Thursday, April 18	1.245.000	19,7%
10	Thursday, April 25	1.406.000	22,5%
11	Thursday, May 2	1.377.000	20,2%
12	Tuesday, May 7	1.126.000	18,6%
13	Tuesday, May 14	1.139.000	18,8%
14	Tuesday, May 21	1.086.000	18,4%
15	Tuesday, May 28	1.135.000	19,3%
16	Tuesday, June 4	1.048.000	17,5%
17	Tuesday, June 11	1.327.000	18,5%
