= Nagore Robles =

Spanish television personality

- Born: Nagore Robles Gutiérrez; 10 February 1986 (age 40); Basauri, Vizcaya, Basque Country, Spain
- Occupation: Television presenter
- Years active: 2009–present

Nagore Robles Gutiérrez (born February 10, 1983) is a Spanish television presenter and collaborator who rose to prominence after her participation in the reality show Gran Hermano in the season 11 in 2009. Since then, she has participated in various television programs, mainly developing her career within the Mediaset España group.

== Biography ==
Born in Basauri en 1983, Nagore entered the casting of Gran Hermano 11 in 2009, in its eleventh edition, where she was the fourth expelled with the highest percentage in the history of the reality show in Spain, 95%. The success of that edition made the network count on Nagore for future television projects, making him a regular in the debates of Gran Hermano, Supervivientes and other television formats of Telecinco.

In 2011, she joined the cast of contestants of Acorralados: perdidos en el bosque, where she was the winner. Her work in television increased after that, particularly in places like De buena ley. She also co–wrote a book with the members of Bolleras Viajeras entitled Siete Tentaciones. In subsequent years, she signed on as a collaborator on El programa de Ana Rosa in 2012 and as a love advisor on Mujeres y hombres y viceversa in 2013, where she remained until its cancellation in 2021. In the dating show, she became the presenter during Toñi Moreno's maternity leave between 2019 and 2020.

In 2017, she competed in the imitation talent show Me lo dices o me lo cantas on Telecinco, where she participated in Cristina Rodríguezs team, being the finalist of said team. A year later, she participated in the celebrity culinary talent show Ven a cenar conmigo: Gourmet edition. She also continued to host talk shows in Gran Hermano VIP, La casa fuerte and El debate de las tentaciones.

Several media outlets and written press consider her to be one of Spain's most influential LGTBI people. In advertising, she has participated in the Mediaset España campaign to promote collective awareness against the spread of COVID-19. She also participated in the first national campaign of the social network Tinder in Spain.

In 2021, she premiered her first program of her own as a presenter, Sobreviviré, on Mitele (Mediaset España), a social debate–type program produced by Bulldog TV. The program was renewed for a second season after the success of the first, becoming a daily program.

In March 2022, she began presenting the dating show Baila conmigo on Cuatro.

== Private life ==
In September 2011, coinciding with Nagore's participation in Acorralados, her relationship with the DJ and daughter of Bárbara Rey, Sofía Cristo, became public. In early 2013, they made their breakup public.

In 2016 she begins a romantic relationship with journalist and writer Sandra Barneda that ended in 2022.

== Trajectory ==
Year	Title	Channel	Role
2009	Gran Hermano 11	Telecinco	Contestant. 3rd Expelled
2010 – 2013	De buena ley	Telecinco	Collaborator
2010 – 2017	Gran Hermano: El Debate	Telecinco	Collaborator
2011	Acorralados	Telecinco	Contestant. Winner
2011	Sálvame	Telecinco	Collaborator
2012 – 2013	El programa de Ana Rosa	Telecinco	Collaborator
2013	Campamento de Verano	Telecinco	Guest
2013 – 2021	Mujeres y hombres y viceversa	Telecinco / Cuatro	Opinionist
2015 – 2019	Gran Hermano VIP: El Debate	Telecinco	Collaborator
2015 – 2019	Supervivientes: Conexión Honduras	Telecinco	Collaborator
2016 – 2019	Gran Hermano VIP: Límite 48 horas	Telecinco / Cuatro	Collaborator
2016	Hable con ellas	Telecinco	Collaborator
2017	Me lo dices o me lo cantas	Telecinco	Contestant. Finalist
2017 – 2020	Supervivientes: Tierra de Nadie	Telecinco / Cuatro	Collaborator
2018	Ven a cenar conmigo: Gourmet edition	Cuatro	Participant. Winner
2019	Gran Hermano Dúo: El Debate	Telecinco	Collaborator
2019	Gran Hermano Dúo: Límite 48 horas	Telecinco	Collaborator
2019	Adivina qué hago esta noche	Cuatro	Guest. Program 5.
2019 – 2020	Mujeres y hombres y viceversa	Cuatro	Host
2020 – 2022	El Debate de las Tentaciones	Telecinco / Cuatro	Collaborator
2020	La Casa Fuerte	Telecinco	Collaborator
2021	Ya es mediodía	Telecinco	Guest
2021	Sobreviviré	Mitele Plus	Presentadora
2022	Secret Story: La Casa de los Secretos	Telecinco	Collaborator and guest
2022	Baila conmigo	Cuatro	Host
2022	Quiero ser famoso	Be Mad	Host

== Published works ==
- Robles, Nagore (2012). Siete tentaciones. Stonewall. ISBN 9788420434032.
