= Gran Hermano (Spanish TV series) season 4 =

Gran Hermano
- Season 4
- Presented by: Mercedes Milá
- No. of days: 103
- No. of housemates: 13
- Winner: Pedro Oliva
- Runner-up: Desirée Albertalli

Release
- Original network: Telecinco
- Original release: 6 October 2002 – 16 January 2003

Season chronology
- ← Previous; Season 3 Next → Season 5

Gran Hermano 4 is the fourth season of the reality television series Gran Hermano which was broadcast in Spain on Telecinco and La Siete and produced by Endemol. Season 4 lasted for 103 days from October 6, 2002, to January 16, 2003. Pedro Oliva emerged as the winner.

== Summary ==
Start Date: October 6, 2002 End Date: January 16, 2003

Duration: 103 days

The Finalists: 3 - Pedro (The Winner), Desirée (Runner-up) and Rafa (3rd)

Evicted Housemates: 9 - Anna, Gustavo († 30 June 2006), Inma, Judith, Mario, Matías, Nacho, Rocío and Sonia

Voluntary Exits: 1 - María

== Future Appearances ==
Pedro Oliva was in Supervivientes: Perdidos en Honduras on 2007.

Matías was in Supervivientes: Perdidos en Honduras on 2009.

Sonia was in Supervivientes: Perdidos en Nicaragua on 2010.

In the 2010 season Gran Hermano: El Reencuentro (All Stars), Nacho and Desirée returned to the house.

== Contestants in eviction order ==
Housemates	Age	Residence	Occupation	Entered	Exited	Status
Pedro Oliva	33	Zaragoza	Civil Servant	Day 1	Day 103	Winner
Désirée Albertalli	25	La Coruña	Nurse	Day 1	Day 103	Runner-up
Rafa López	24	Zamora	Seminarian and bookseller	Day 1	Day 103	3rd Place
Nacho Utrera	25	Sevilla	Public relations	Day 1	Day 99	9th Evicted
Matías Fernández	30	Las Palmas	Waiter	Day 1	Day 96	8th Evicted
Inma González	32	Cádiz	Businesswoman	Day 1	Day 89	7th Evicted
Rocío Rodríguez	24	Málaga	Administrator	Day 1	Day 82	6th Evicted
Gustavo Fernández†	25	Vizcaya	Boxer and model	Day 1	Day 68	5th Evicted
Judith Andreú	29	Barcelona	Secretary	Day 1	Day 54	4th Evicted
Anna Franco	20	Barcelona	Political science student	Day 12	Day 40	3rd Evicted
Mario Artiaga	22	Madrid	Business student	Day 1	Day 26	2nd Evicted
Sonia Arenas	24	Granada	Flight attendant	Day 1	Day 12	1st Evicted
María Moratilla	31	Madrid	Marketing director	Day 1	Day 5	Walked

== Nominations Table ==
	Week 1	Week 3	Week 5	Week 7	Week 9	Week 11	Week 12	Week 13	Week 14	Week 15 Final		Nominations received
Pedro	Desirée, Nacho, Rafa	Judith, Nacho, Rafa	Desirée, Judith, Rafa	Desirée, Judith, Rafa	Desirée, Nacho, Rafa	Desirée, Nacho, Rafa	Desirée, Nacho, Rafa	Desirée, Nacho, Rafa	Nacho, Rafa	Winner (Day 103)		24
Desirée	Inma, Matías, Rafa	Anna, Pedro, Rafa	Anna, Pedro, Rafa	Gustavo, Pedro, Rocío	Gustavo, Pedro, Rocío	Inma, Pedro, Rocío	Inma, Matías, Pedro	Matías, Pedro, Rafa	Pedro, Rafa	Runner-up (Day 103)		23
Rafa	Desirée, Mario, Rocío	Anna, Mario, Rocío	Anna, Matías, Pedro	Gustavo, Pedro, Rocío	Gustavo, Nacho, Pedro	Matías, Pedro, Rocío	Inma, Matías, Pedro	Matías, Nacho, Pedro	Nacho, Pedro	Third place (Day 103)		35
Nacho	Inma, Rocío, Sonia	Anna, Judith, Mario	Pedro, Rafa, Rocío	Inma, Pedro, Rocío	Gustavo, Inma, Rocío	Mathias, Pedro, Rocío	Inma, Matías, Pedro	Matías, Pedro, Rafa	Pedro, Rafa	Evicted (Day 99)		27
Matías	Desirée, Rafa, Sonia	Anna, Judith, Mario	Desirée, Judith, Rafa	Desirée, Judith, Rafa	Gustavo, Nacho, Rafa	Desirée, Nacho, Rafa	Desirée, Nacho, Rafa	Desirée, Nacho, Rafa	Evicted (Day 96)			11
Inma	Judith, Nacho, Rocío	Anna, Judith, Mario	Anna, Desirée, Rocío	Desirée, Judith, Rafa	Desirée, Gustavo, Nacho	Nacho, Rafa, Rocío	Desirée, Nacho, Rafa	Evicted (Day 89)				12
Rocío	Gustavo, Rafa, Sonia	Gustavo, Mario, Rafa	Anna, Judith, Nacho	Desirée, Judith, Nacho	Desirée, Nacho, Rafa	Desirée, Nacho, Rafa	Evicted (Day 82)					22
Gustavo	Judith, Nacho, Rocío	Anna, Mario, Rocío	Anna, Rafa, Rocío	Desirée, Judith, Rafa	Inma, Nacho, Rafa	Evicted (Day 68)						12
Judith	Gustavo, Inma, Sonia	Anna, Mathias, Pedro	Matías, Pedro, Rocío	Gustavo, Inma, Rocío	Evicted (Day 54)							16
Anna	Not in House	Desirée, Judith, Mario	Gustavo, Matías, Nacho	Evicted (Day 40)								13
Mario	Inma, Pedro, Rafa	Anna, Nacho, Rocío	Evicted (Day 26)									8
Sonia	Judith, Nacho, Rocío	Evicted (Day 12)										4
María	Walked (Day 5)											N/A
Nomination notes	1	2	3	4	5	6	7	8	9	10		
Against public vote	Inma, Rafa, Rocío, Sonia	Anna, Judith, Mario, Rafa, Rocío	Anna, Desirée, Judith, Matías, Pedro, Rafa, Rocío	Desirée, Judith, Rafa	Desirée, Gustavo, Nacho	Desirée, Nacho, Pedro, Rafa, Rocío	Desirée, Inma, Nacho, Pedro, Rafa	Matías, Pedro, Rafa	Nacho, Pedro, Rafa	Desirée, Pedro, Rafa		
Walked	María	none										
Evicted	Sonia; 52.9% to evict	Mario; 38.6% to evict	Anna; 29% to evict	Judith; 72.8% to evict	Gustavo; 48.1% to evict	Rocío; 52.18% to evict	Inma; 77.48% to evict	Matías; 66.36% to evict	Nacho; 47.5% to evict	Rafa; 15.80% to win	Desirée; 37.67% to win	
Evicted	Sonia; 52.9% to evict	Mario; 38.6% to evict	Anna; 29% to evict	Judith; 72.8% to evict	Gustavo; 48.1% to evict	Rocío; 52.18% to evict	Inma; 77.48% to evict	Matías; 66.36% to evict	Nacho; 47.5% to evict	Pedro; 46.53% to win		

=== Notes ===
- ^Note 1 : Rafa was able to void one of Nacho's nominations.
- ^Note 2 : Mario was able to void two of Judith's nominations.
- ^Note 3 : Gustavo was able to void one of Pedro's nominations, and Rafa was able to void one of Rocío's nominations.
- ^Note 4 : Judith was able to void one of Desirée's nominations, and Pedro was able to void one of Rocío's nominations.
- ^Note 5 : Inma and Desirée were each able to void one of Rafa's nominations.
- ^Note 6 : Nacho was able to void one of Rafa's nominations, and Matías was able to void one of Rocío's nominations.
- ^Note 7 : Pedro was able to void one of Matías' nominations.
- ^Note 8 : Rafa was able to void one of Nacho's nominations.
- ^Note 9 : Rafa was able to void one of Pedro's nominations.
- ^Note 10 : For the final 4 days, the public were voting for a winner, rather than to evict.
