= Gran Hermano (Spanish TV series) season 2 =

Gran Hermano
- Season 2
- Presented by: Mercedes Milá
- No. of days: 102
- No. of housemates: 13
- Winner: Sabrina Mahí
- Runner-up: Fran García

Release
- Original network: Telecinco
- Original release: 18 March – 27 June 2001

Season chronology
- ← Previous; Season 1 Next → Season 3

Gran Hermano 2 launched on March 18, 2001, with the final taking place on June 27, 2001, lasting 102 days. It is the second Spanish edition of the reality franchise Big Brother. Mercedes Milá returned as the main host of the show, also known as the Gala, which consists of both the nominations and the eviction which was broadcast on Telecinco.

Fayna was in La Isla de los FamoS.O.S. 2 in 2003.

In the 2004 season Gran Hermano VIP 1, Marta returned to the house.

Marta was in El Reencuentro in 2011.

== Summary ==
Start Date: March 18, 2001 End Date: June 27, 2001

Duration: 102 days

The Finalists: 3 - Sabrina (The Winner), Fran (Runner-up) and Mari (3rd)

Evicted Housemates: 9 - Ángel, Alonso, Emilio, Eva, Fayna, Kaiet, Karola, Marta and Roberto

Ejected Housemates: 1 - Carlos

== Contestants in eviction order ==
Housemates	Age	Residence	Occupation	Entered	Exited	Status
Sabrina Mahí	23	Málaga	Promoter	Day 1	Day 102	Winner
Fran García	35	Badajoz	Rancher	Day 1	Day 102	Runner-up
Mari Arrabal	27	Cádiz	Saleswoman and waitress	Day 1	Day 102	3rd Place
Ángel Tous	24	Alicante	Criminology student	Day 1	Day 100	9th Evicted
Kaiet López	26	Bilbao	Businessman	Day 1	Day 95	8th Evicted
Alonso Jiménez	24	Granada	Boat keeper	Day 1	Day 88	7th Evicted
Eva Paz	28	Palma de Mallorca	Waitress	Day 1	Day 81	6th Evicted
Emilio Lozano	28	Madrid	Businessman	Day 1	Day 67	5th Evicted
Karola Alonso	24	Logroño	Student	Day 1	Day 53	4th Evicted
Roberto Cendrero	34	Madrid	Businessman	Day 25	Day 39	3rd Evicted
Fayna Bethencourt	22	Las Palmas	Student and tour guide	Day 1	Day 25	2nd Evicted
Carlos Navarro	24	Barcelona	Unemployed baker	Day 1	Day 19	Ejected
Marta López	27	Madrid	Businesswoman	Day 1	Day 11	1st Evicted

== Nominations table ==
This year, Housemates nominated three Housemates for eviction, and the three or more Housemates with the most Nominations faced the public vote.

	Week 1	Week 3	Week 5	Week 7	Week 9	Week 11	Week 12	Week 13	Week 14	Week 15 Final		Nominations received
Sabrina	Fran; Fayna; Mari	Fayna; Fran; Carlos	Fran; Roberto; Kaiet	Alonso; Kaiet; Karola	Alonso; Mari; Emilio	Kaiet; Eva; Mari	Kaiet; Alonso; Mari	Ángel	Fran; Mari	Winner (Day 102)		18
Fran	Mari; Emilio; Eva	Kaiet; Fayna; Alonso	Ángel; Karola; Sabrina	Kaiet; Karola; Mari	Emilio; Ángel; Sabrina	Eva; Kaiet; Mari	Ángel; Sabrina; Alonso	Kaiet	Sabrina; Ángel	Runner-up (Day 102)		38
Mari	Fayna; Sabrina; Fran	Carlos; Fayna; Fran	Fran; Roberto; Kaiet	Fran; Kaiet; Sabrina	Sabrina; Fran; Kaiet	Fran; Kaiet; Sabrina	Sabrina; Ángel; Kaiet	Fran	Ángel; Sabrina	Third place (Day 102)		17
Ángel	Fran; Sabrina; Alonso	Carlos; Fayna; Fran	Fran; Roberto; Alonso	Eva; Alonso; Karola	Alonso; Eva; Emilio	Eva; Mari; Alonso	Alonso; Mari; Fran	Sabrina	Mari; Fran	Evicted (Day 100)		19
Kaiet	Fran; Marta; Carlos	Carlos; Fayna; Fran	Roberto; Fran; Emilio	Mari; Emilio; Alonso	Emilio; Mari; Fran	Fran; Eva; Mari	Mari; Fran; Sabrina	Ángel	Evicted (Day 95)			21
Alonso	Carlos; Fayna; Ángel	Carlos; Karola; Emilio	Roberto; Fran; Emilio	Fran; Karola; Sabrina	Ángel; Emilio; Fran	Ángel; Fran; Sabrina	Ángel; Sabrina; Fran	Evicted (Day 88)				22
Eva	Marta; Fran; Fayna	Fran; Fayna; Carlos	Fran; Roberto; Ángel	Fran; Sabrina; Kaiet	Kaiet; Sabrina; Fran	Kaiet; Ángel; Alonso	Evicted (Day 81)					10
Emilio	Alonso; Kaiet; Eva	Carlos; Ángel; Fayna	Kaiet; Ángel; Alonso	Alonso; Ángel; Kaiet	Alonso; Ángel; Kaiet	Evicted (Day 67)						11
Karola	Marta; Fran; Eva	Fran; Carlos; Alonso	Fran; Roberto; Ángel	Fran; Sabrina; Alonso	Evicted (Day 53)							7
Roberto	Not in House		Eva; Emilio; Karola	Evicted (Day 39)								7
Fayna	Marta; Mari; Fran	Alonso; Mari; Ángel	Evicted (Day 25)									12
Carlos	Kaiet; Alonso; Fran	Ángel; Alonso; Kaiet	Ejected (Day 19)									11
Marta	Fran; Carlos; Fayna	Evicted (Day 11)										4
Nomination Notes	none	1	none					2	3	4		
Nominated for eviction	Fayna; Fran; Marta	Alonso; ~~Carlos~~; Fayna; Fran	Ángel; Fran; Roberto	Alonso; Fran; Kaiet; Karola; Sabrina	Alonso; Ángel; Emilio; Fran; Kaiet; Sabrina	Eva; Kaiet; Mari	Alonso; Ángel; Fran; Mari; Sabrina	Fran; Kaiet; Mari; Sabrina	Ángel; Fran; Mari; Sabrina	Fran; Mari; Sabrina		
Ejected	none	Carlos	none									
Evicted	Marta; 59% to evict	Fayna; 74% to evict	Roberto; 44.93% to evict	Karola; 84.1% to evict	Emilio; 46.9% to evict	Eva; 66.4% to evict	Alonso; 33.8% to evict	Kaiet; 65% to evict	Ángel; 47.5% to evict	Mari; 12.3% to win	Fran; 37.9% to win	
Evicted	Marta; 59% to evict	Fayna; 74% to evict	Roberto; 44.93% to evict	Karola; 84.1% to evict	Emilio; 46.9% to evict	Eva; 66.4% to evict	Alonso; 33.8% to evict	Kaiet; 65% to evict	Ángel; 47.5% to evict	Sabrina; 49.8% to win		

=== Notes ===
- ^Note 1: On Day 19, Carlos was ejected for threatening behaviour. Had he not been ejected he would have faced the public vote along with Fayna and Fran. The revised Nomination list after his ejection placed Alonso on the Nomination list. Roberto later entered as a replacement Housemate for Carlos.
- ^Note 2: This week, the Housemates had to vote for one Housemate they wanted to save from eviction. Ángel, with two votes, was the only Housemate immune this Week.
- ^Note 3: Housemates only nominated two other Housemates each this Week, instead of the regular three.
- ^Note 4: Following Ángel's eviction, the public voted for who they wanted to win, rather than to save.

== Nominations total received ==
	Week 1	Week 3	Week 5	Week 7	Week 9	Week 11	Week 12	Week 13	Week 14	Final	Total
Sabrina	2	0	1	4	3	2	4	1	2	Winner	17
Fran	9	6	7	4	4	3	3	1	2	Runner-up	36
Mari	3	1	0	2	2	4	3	0	2	Third place	17
Ángel	1	3	4	1	3	2	3	2	2	Evicted	17
Kaiet	3	2	3	5	3	4	2	1	Evicted		21
Alonso	3	4	2	5	3	2	3	Evicted			22
Eva	3	0	1	1	1	4	Evicted				10
Emilio	1	1	3	1	5	Evicted					11
Karola	0	1	2	4	Evicted						7
Roberto	Not in House		7	Evicted							7
Fayna	5	7	Evicted								12
Carlos	3	8	Ejected								11
Marta	4	Evicted									4

== See also ==
- Main Article about the show
