= Gran Hermano (Spanish TV series) season 7 =

Gran Hermano
- Season 7
- Presented by: Mercedes Milá
- No. of days: 109
- No. of housemates: 14
- Winner: Pepe Herrero
- Runner-up: Javier Varela

Release
- Original network: Telecinco
- Original release: 20 October 2005 – 5 February 2006

Season chronology
- ← Previous; Season 6 Next → Season 8

Gran Hermano 7 launched on October 20, 2005, with the final taking place on February 5, 2006, lasting 109 days. It is the seventh Spanish edition of the reality franchise Big Brother. Mercedes Milá returned as the main host of the show, also known as the Gala, which consists of both the nominations and the eviction which was broadcast on Spanish television station Telecinco.

In 2010, season Gran Hermano: El Reencuentro (All Stars), Pepe the winner of this season, Inma, Raquel L and Beatriz return at the house.

== Summary ==
Start Date: October 20, 2005 End Date: February 5, 2006

Duration: 109 days

The Winner: 3- Pepe (The Winner), Javier (Runner-up) and Raquel Abad (3rd)

Evicted Housemates: 10 - Arturo, Dayron, Estrella, Inma (December 29, 1975), Jesús, Maite, Raquel López, Sara, Saray and Tono

Voluntary Exits: 1 - Beatriz

== Housemates ==
Housemates	Age	Residence	Occupation	Entered	Exited	Status
José Antonio ''Pepe'' Herrero	33	Madrid	Flight assistant	Day 1	Day 109	Winner
Javier Varela	26	Málaga	Professional golf player	Day 1	Day 109	Runner-up
Raquel Abad	21	La Coruña	Student and saleswoman	Day 1	Day 109	3rd Place
Dayron Mojena	22	Granada	Dancer	Day 1	Day 106	10th Evicted
Raquel López	27	Málaga	Violin student	Day 1	Day 99	9th Evicted
Jesús Tinajo	25	Ciudad Real	Diplomat	Day 1	Day 92	8th Evicted
Sara de Lucas	20	Málaga	Administrative	Day 1	Day 85	7th Evicted
Arturo Sisniega	26	Madrid	Aerobics coordinator	Day 1	Day 78	6th Evicted
Antonio "Tono" Rodríguez	26	Pontevedra	Book salesman	Day 1	Day 71	5th Evicted
Saray Leal	25	Guipúzcoa	Waitress	Day 1	Day 57	4th Evicted
Mayte Salas	26	León	Telemarketer	Day 22	Day 43	3rd Evicted
Inmaculada "Inma" Contreras	29	Granada	Librarianship	Day 1	Day 29	2nd Evicted
Beatriz Gómez	42	Madrid	Entrepreneur	Day 1	Day 20	Walked
Estrella Mata	25	Madrid	Nursing assistant	Day 1	Day 16	1st Evicted

== Nominations table ==
	Week 1	Week 3	Week 5	Week 7	Week 9	Week 10	Week 11	Week 12	Week 13	Week 14	Week 15 Final		Nominations received
Pepe	Inma; Arturo; Saray	~~Sara~~; Jesús; Inma; Arturo	Sara; Maite; Saray	Saray; Tono; Jesús	Dayron; Tono; Jesús	Dayron; Sara; Raquel A	Raquel A Sara; Jesús	Dayron; Jesús; Raquel A	Javier; Dayron; Raquel L	Javier; Dayron	Winner (Day 109)		101
Javier	Beatriz; Inma; Sara	~~Inma~~; Sara; Saray; Tono	~~Sara~~; ~~Maite~~; ~~Saray~~	Sara; Saray; Tono	Sara; Arturo; Dayron	Sara; Arturo; Raquel L	Raquel A Pepe; Dayron	Raquel A Pepe; Dayron	Pepe; Raquel L Dayron	Pepe; Dayron	Runner-up (Day 109)		37
Raquel A	Inma; Beatriz; Sara	~~Raquel L~~; Saray; Inma; Sara	~~Pepe~~; ~~Maite~~; ~~Raquel L~~	Pepe; Dayron; Raquel L	Pepe; Dayron; Raquel L	Dayron; Pepe; Raquel L	Dayron; Pepe; Raquel L	Pepe; Raquel L Dayron	Pepe; Raquel L Dayron	Javier; Pepe	Third place (Day 109)		37
Dayron	Inma; Arturo; Beatriz	~~Arturo~~; Saray; Raquel L Tono	~~Sara~~; ~~Saray~~; ~~Maite~~	Saray; Tono; Jesús	Pepe; Jesús; Tono	Pepe; Sara; Raquel L	Pepe; Sara; Jesús	Pepe; Raquel A Jesús	Raquel A Raquel L Javier	Javier; Pepe	Evicted (Day 106)		101
Raquel L	Beatriz; Inma; Estrella	~~Inma~~; Raquel A Saray; Tono	~~Raquel A~~; ~~Tono~~; ~~Sara~~	Tono; Dayron; Sara	Tono; Dayron; Sara	Dayron; Sara; Javier	Sara; Dayron; Javier	Dayron; Javier; Raquel A	Dayron; Javier; Raquel A	Evicted (Day 99)			38
Jesús	Beatriz; Inma; Estrella	~~Inma~~; Dayron; Pepe; Raquel A	~~Pepe~~; ~~Dayron~~; ~~Javier~~	Dayron; Pepe; Raquel L	Dayron; Pepe; Sara	Dayron; Pepe; Arturo	Raquel A Pepe; Dayron	Raquel A Pepe; Dayron	Evicted (Day 92)				13
Sara	Inma; Raquel A Estrella	~~Dayron~~; Pepe; Javier; Inma	Javier; Pepe; Dayron	Pepe; Dayron; Javier	Dayron; Pepe; Javier	Dayron; Pepe; Javier	Dayron; Javier; Pepe	Evicted (Day 85)					49
Arturo	Inma; Beatriz; Raquel L	~~Pepe~~; Dayron; Inma; Raquel L	~~Pepe~~; ~~Dayron~~; ~~Javier~~	Pepe; Dayron; Raquel L	Dayron; Pepe; Raquel A	Dayron; Raquel A Pepe	Evicted (Day 78)						14
Tono	Beatriz; Inma; Estrella	~~Inma~~; Dayron; Pepe; Raquel L	~~Javier~~; ~~Dayron~~; ~~Maite~~	Dayron; Pepe; Javier	Dayron; Pepe; Sara	Evicted (Day 71)							23
Saray	Inma; Estrella; Dayron	~~Pepe~~; Raquel L Inma; Raquel A	~~Maite~~; ~~Dayron~~; ~~Pepe~~	Pepe; Dayron; Raquel L	Evicted (Day 57)								26
Maite	Not in House		~~Saray~~; ~~Tono~~; ~~Raquel L~~	Evicted (Day 43)									11
Inma	Raquel L Sara; Beatriz	~~Javier~~; Raquel L Tono; Pepe	Evicted (Day 29)										56
Beatriz	Pepe; Inma; Javier	Walked (Day 20)											20
Estrella	Inma; Beatriz; Sara	Evicted (Day 16)											6
Nomination Notes	1	2	3	none						4	5		
Nominated (Pre-HoH)	Beatriz, Estrella, Inma	Dayron, Inma, Raquel L, Saray	Maite, Javier, Pepe, Sara	Dayron, Pepe, Saray, Tono	Dayron, Pepe, Sara, Tono	Dayron, Pepe, Sara	Dayron, Pepe, Raquel A	Dayron, Pepe, Raquel A	Dayron, Javier, Pepe, Raquel L	Javier, Pepe	none		
Saved	Beatriz	Saray	Pepe	Tono	Sara	Sara	Raquel A	Raquel A	Javier	Javier	none		
Against public vote	Estrella, Inma, Sara	Dayron, Inma, Raquel L	Maite, Javier, Sara	Dayron, Pepe, Saray	Dayron, Pepe, Tono	Arturo, Dayron, Pepe, Raquel A, Raquel L	Dayron, Pepe, Sara	Dayron, Jesús, Pepe	Dayron, Pepe, Raquel L	Dayron, Pepe	Javier, Pepe, Raquel A		
Walked	none	Beatriz	none										
Evicted	Estrella; 38.9% to evict	Inma; 76.4% to evict	Maite; 48.7% to evict	Saray; 70% to evict	Tono; 73% to evict	Arturo; 44% to evict	Sara; 72.8% to evict	Jesús; 73% to evict	Raquel L 73.9% to evict	Dayron; 66% to evict	Raquel A 3.6% (out of 3)	Javier; 9.2% (out of 3)	
Evicted	Estrella; 38.9% to evict	Inma; 76.4% to evict	Maite; 48.7% to evict	Saray; 70% to evict	Tono; 73% to evict	Arturo; 44% to evict	Sara; 72.8% to evict	Jesús; 73% to evict	Raquel L 73.9% to evict	Dayron; 66% to evict	Pepe; 87.2% to win		

=== Notes ===
- ^Note 1 : Pepe was automatically nominated by Big Brother by accepting a secret task. If he were able to take care of Estrella, Inma, and Raquel A in secret (the rest of the House assuming them to be evicted by Big Brother) then he would lose his nomination. He successfully passed the tasked, however could still be nominated by his fellow Housemates in regular nominations.
- ^Note 2 : This week, Big Brother lied to the Housemates stating that they would be nominating a fourth Housemate this week on 4 points. However, all nominations made for 4 points were disregarded by Big Brother and only the nominations worth 3 or less points had an effect on nominations.
- ^Note 3 : Pepe and Sara were the only Housemates that nominated on time this week. Because all other Housemates failed to nominate on time, only Pepe and Sara's nominations were counted.
- ^Note 4 : For the final week of nominations, Housemates only nominated 2 other Housemates on 2 points and 1 points, as opposed to the normal 3. Also, Only 2 Housemates had to face the public vote this week, asopposed to the regular 3.
- ^Note 5 : For the final three days, the public were voting to win, rather than to evict.
