= Gran Hermano (Spanish TV series) season 10 =

Gran Hermano
- Season 10
- Presented by: Mercedes Milá
- No. of days: 124
- No. of housemates: 18
- Winner: Iván Madrazo
- Runner-up: Orlando Breyner

Release
- Original network: Telecinco
- Original release: September 21, 2008 – January 22, 2009

Season chronology
- ← Previous; Season 9 Next → Season 11

Gran Hermano 10 launched on September 21, 2008, and ended January 22, 2009. It was the tenth Spanish edition of the reality television show Big Brother, which lasted a total of 124 days. The show ended with Ivan as the winner and Orlando as runner-up.

In 2010, in season Gran Hermano: El Reencuentro, Orlando, Gema, Almudena and Ana returned to the house. In 2011, season El Reencuentro 2, Iván and Loli returned to the house. In the 2016 season Gran Hermano VIP 4, Liz returned to the house.

== Housemates ==
When Gran Hermano 10 started, fourteen housemates entered a replica of the old Gran Hermano 1 house. A married couple, Gema and Carlos F. entered the real GH10 house. Their objective was not to be discovered as a married couple. If they were discovered, one of them would be evicted.

Each week, the GH1 housemates had to nominate two contestants with one point each to evict. The two with the most votes would face the public vote. The audience had to decide who would enter the GH10 house and who would be evicted. In Week 6, Javier and Estefanía randomly entered the GH10 house, while Liz entered the GH1 house with Julio and Mirentxu. In Week 7, after a mistake by Gran Hermano, GH10 housemates accidentally discovered that Julio, Liz and Mirentxu weren't evicted; the producers decided to let them enter the GH10 house. On Day 87, Ana, Eva, and Gema earned the opportunity to return to the GH10 and be eligible to win the grand prize; housemates in the GH10 house voted for Ana to return and Eva and Gema were re-evicted. On Day 101, Ana was ejected from the house for constantly revealing information from the outside world.

Housemates	Age	Residence	Occupation	Entered	Exited	Status
Iván Madrazo	35	Cantabria	Businessman and model	Day 1	Day 124	Winner
Orlando Breyner	28	Valencia	Showman	Day 1	Day 124	Runner-up
Almudena Martínez	24	Murcia	Cashier	Day 1	Day 124	3rd Place
Lizfanny "Liz" Emiliano	24	Guipúzcoa	International model	Day 31	Day 117	15th Evicted
Julio "Julito" González	28	Tenerife	Opponent to National Police	Day 1	Day 109	14th Evicted
Javier Palomares	23	Ciudad Real	Musician	Day 1	Day 101	13th Evicted
Ana Toro	36	Granada	Publicist	Day 89	Day 101	Ejected
Ana Toro	36	Granada	Publicist	Day 1	Day 24	4th Evicted
Mirentxu Álvarez	69	Guipúzcoa	Retired	Day 1	Day 94	12th Evicted
Carlos Fernández	28	Barcelona	Welder	Day 1	Day 87	11th Evicted
Gisela Betancort	22	Tenerife	Model	Day 1	Day 80	10th Evicted
Estefanía "Nani" Sánchez	22	Madrid	Unemployed	Day 31	Day 73	9th Evicted
Dolores "Loli" Fernández	26	Granada	Beautician and Biology student	Day 1	Day 66	8th Evicted
Carlos Hoya	31	Cantabria	Estate agent	Day 1	Day 59	7th Evicted
Gema Zafra	26	Barcelona	Administrative unemployed	Day 89	Day 94	6th Evicted
Gema Zafra	26	Barcelona	Administrative unemployed	Day 1	Day 45	6th Evicted
Jie Li	23	Madrid	Saleswoman	Day 1	Day 31	5th Evicted
Raquel Gómez	33	La Coruña	Stewardess	Day 1	Day 17	3rd Evicted
Eva Freire	24	La Coruña	Livestock and waitress	Day 89	Day 94	2nd Evicted
Eva Freire	24	La Coruña	Livestock and waitress	Day 1	Day 10	2nd Evicted
Germán Ramírez	37	Barcelona	PR and TV presenter	Day 1	Day 3	1st Evicted

- Raquel, Jie Li, Loli, Nani, Gisela, Gema, Liz and Almudena appeared naked on Interviú (popular magazine that does naked artistic photography of famous people).
- In February 2010, an All-Stars edition - Gran Hermano: El Reencuentro debuted; 14 days onto the edition, GH10 housemates Almudena, Orlando, Gema and Ana entered the house.
- Loli and Ivan entered in the first edition of El Reencuentro 2011.
- Gema broke with Carlos and in 2012 she took part in Mujeres y Hombres y Viceversa.
- Liz was 'tronista' of Mujeres y Hombres y Viceversa in 2013.
- Almudena was a journalist on Sálvame.
- Almudena was on Supervivientes: Perdidos en Honduras 2014.
- From January 2016 to February 2016, Liz was in Gran Hermano VIP 4. She was the 5th evicted.

=== Ana Toro ===
Ana Toro was 36 years old and was from Granada. She entered the House on the Day 1. She had a special friendship with Germán. Ana was designing her own dresses and was a very charismatic girl. She had problems with Loli and Almudena for her to be evicted. She was expelled on the Day 24 by 48.3 % of the votes without being in the House 10. She returned on the Day 87 to the House 1 with Eve and Gema, and managed to return to be a competitor on the Day 94. The program decided to expel her on the Day 101 for having told things about the outside world to the other contestants.

=== Almudena ===
Almudena was 24 years old and was from Murcia. Everyone called her Chiqui. She is the shortest competitor of Big Brother Spain. She entered in the House 1 at Day 1, and passed to the House 10 on Day 24. In House 1, she had arguments with Ana Toro because she did not want to do the deal for to be all nominated. In House 10 she had discussions with Nani and Mirentxu. She loved Orlando, but it wasn't reciprocal. She was called hypocrite by their housemates. She was the 3rd finalist with the 7,8%

=== Carlos and Gema Fernández ===
Carlos Fernández was 28, his wife Gema was 26 and they lived in Barcelona. They entered in the House 10 on Day 1 and they had to hide the secret of their marriage from the housemates. Nobody noticed them. He declared that he never wanted to be on the show if it wasn't for Gema. They had a lot of problems with Ivan, as the rest of the house. All of his housemates called him Carlitos. On Day 87 he was evicted with 67% of the votes. They both had a special friendship with Orlando. Gema was the housemate in House 10 to be eliminated (56% of the vote was between Ivan and Gisela on Day 45).

=== Carlos Hoya ===
Carlos Hoya was 31 and was from Cantabria. He entered in the House 1 on Day 1, and he passed to House 10 on Day 10. He declared that he and Ivan were enemies before their entrance in Big Brother. In the game, he always had confrontations with Ivan. He liked Loli, but didn't have anything with her in the house. He was evicted on day 59 with the 55,2% of the votes in a close eviction with Ivan, Mirentxu and Liz, and he didn't want to return to the house when the competitors' return was done

=== Eva ===
Eva came from A Coruña and was 24 years old. She was farmer and a part-time waitress. She entered in House 1 at Day 1, and she was eliminated on day 10 with 58.6% of the votes in front of Carlos Hoya. She had problems with Ana Toro and Mirentxu. On Day 87, she entered House 1 with Gema and Ana to fight for return to competition but was re-evicted on Day 94. She never set foot in the 10th House.

=== Germán ===
German, who was 37 years old, is a television presenter from Barcelona who entered in the House 1 at Day 1. He only spent two days at the house. He was eliminated with 22.5% of the votes of the public, all contestants being nominated. He had a beautiful friendship with Ana Toro. He never set foot in the 10 House. He didn't want to return to the house when the competitors' return.

=== Gisela ===
Gisela was 22 years old and was from the Canaries. She entered in House 1 on the Day 1. She developed an infatuation towards Carlos and a strong friendship with Almudena, Loli and Nani. She was nominated with Jie Li by the contestants in House 10 (Gema, Carlos F., Loli, Almudena, Carlos H., Orlando and Ivan) on Day 24 because the housemates of House 1 were all nominated (and it's forbidden by the program); the contestant of House 10 declared that they wanted to receive Gisela in their house, not Jie Li. She didn't comment on who she had nominated.. She was an enemy of Liz and of Ivan. On the Day 80 she was eliminated by 57,9 % of the votes.

=== Iván ===
Iván was 35 years old and was from Cantabria. He was model and he declared that he never watched the show before. He entered in the House 1 at Day 1. He declared that he and Carlos were enemies before their entrance in Big Brother. He entered in the House 10 on day 17 after a close eviction with Raquel. He had problems with all of their housemates. He won with the 69,8%.

=== Javier Palomares ===
Javier Palomares, who they all called Palomares, was 23 years old and was from Ciudad Real. He was a musician and passed the day singing. He was very feminine. He entered in the House on the Day 1 and went on to the House 10 on the Day 31 in the Room of the Doors. He did not like to nominate because he never had problems with anybody. For him Mirentxu was like a mother. Julito was the best friend of him, and they created a musical group: The Julja. It was expelled on the Day 101 by 42,5 % of the votes. For a long time, he was seeming to be the winner of the game.

=== Jie Li ===
Jie Li was a Chinese woman who lived in Madrid. She was 23. She entered in the House 1 at Day 1, and she was eliminated on day 31 with 58,6% of the votes in front of Gisela. She was being nominated by the contestants in House 10 (Gema, Carlos F., Loli, Almudena, Carlos H., Orlando and Ivan) because the housemates of House 1 made a deal for to be all nominated (and it's forbidden by the program); the contestant of House 10 declared that they wanted to receive Gisela in their house, not Jie Li. She had no problem with anyone and made a special relationship with Ana. She never set foot in the 10th House.

=== Julito ===
Julio, who they called Julito, was born in Tenerife and he was 28 years old. He entered in the House 1 on the Day 1, and never was nominated by their housemates. He went on to the House 10 on the Day 45 after two weeks living in the House 1 with Mirentxu and Liz. He had a nice friendship with Javier: they formed a musical group called The Julja. Mirentxu was, for him, a mother. He left the house on the Day 109 with 51,6 % of the votes.

=== Liz ===
Liz was from Dominican Republic and lived in Guipúzcoa. She was 24 years old. She was international model and had a baby daughter. She entered in the game at Day 31. She wasn't chosen in the Room of the Doors and went to the House 1. She went on to the House 10 on the Day 45 after two weeks living in the House 1 with Mirentxu and Julio. In House 1, she had problems with Loli, Gisela and Nani, and was friend of Ivan, Orlando and Almudena. She was the least evicted, on Day 117 with 51,9% in front of Orlando.

=== Loli ===
Loli (Dolores) was 26 and was from Granada. She worked as a beautician and studied biology. She entered in the House 1 at Day 1, and passed to the House 10 on Day 24. In House 1 she had arguments with Ana Toro because she did not want to do the deal to be all nominated. In House 10 she had disagreements with Ivan and Liz. Carlos H. loved her, but she did not want to do anything in the house. On her last weeks, she wanted to be nominated because she did not feel comfortable on the house: she never got out of her bed, and always seems depressed. She was eliminated on Day 66 with 61.9% of the votes in front of Nani and Ivan. She had a strong friendship with Nani and Gisela.

=== Mirentxu ===
Mirentxu was from Guipuzcoa and was 69 years old. She is the oldest competitor who has taken part in Big Brother Spain. She entered the House on the Day 1, and never was nominated by their housemates. She went on to the House 10 on the Day 45 after two weeks living in the House 1 with Julito and Liz. She had many problems with Almudena and Iván, who disrupted her sleep. She was taking care of Palomares and Julito as if they were her children. She said often that she wanted to be nominated and leave the house. She did it on Day 94 with 49,9 % of the votes in an expulsion very scolded against Almudena.

=== Nani ===
Estefania (who was called Nani) entered in the game at Day 31. She was chosen at random in the Room of the Doors. She was 22 years old and was from Madrid. She was the only competitor who knew that Gema and Carlos were married. In the house, she developed a strong friendship with Loli and Gisela, and was enemy of Almudena, Ivan and Liz. In addition, she had a loving relation with Orlando. She was eliminated on the Day 73 by 69,6 % of the votes. She was never in the House 1.

=== Orlando ===
Orlando was 28 years old and was from Valencia. He was a market seller. He entered in the House 1 at Day 1. He only spent two days at that house. He passed on the House 10 at Day 2 for live with Gema and Carlos after be the less voted of all contestant nominated. He had a relationship with Nani and a strong friendship with Ivan, and with Gema and Carlos to. He never been in fights. He was the second finalist with 22,4%.

=== Raquel ===
Raquel came from A Coruña and was 33 years old. She worked as a flight attendant on the plane of Real Madrid. She entered in the House 1 at Day 1, and she was eliminated on day 17 with 50.5% of the votes in front of Ivan. The program said that during the Gala, the feedback turned and Raquel ended up being eliminated. She didn't have a special friendship with anyone. She never set foot in the 10th House.

== Nominations table ==
	Week 1		Week 2	Week 3	Week 4	Week 5	Week 6	Week 8	Week 9	Week 10	Week 11	Week 12	Week 13	Week 14	Week 15	Week 16	Week 17 Final		Nomination points received
	Day 1	Day 3	Week 2	Week 3	Week 4	Week 5	Week 6	Week 8	Week 9	Week 10	Week 11	Week 12	Week 13	Week 14	Week 15	Week 16	Week 17 Final		Nomination points received
Iván	No nominations	Mirentxu, Carlos H	Mirentxu, Gisela	In GH 10; House			Gema; Carlos F Carlos H	Orlando; Almudena; Loli	Loli; Nani; Carlos F	~~Nani~~; ~~Carlos F~~; ~~Javier~~	Gisela; Carlos F Mirentxu	Almudena (2)	Mirentxu; Julio; Javier	Liz; Javier; Julio	Julio; Liz; Almudena	Liz; Orlando	Winner (Day 124)		91
Orlando	No nominations	In GH 10; House					Gisela; Carlos H Loli	Iván; Carlos F Nani	Julio; Loli; Mirentxu	~~Mirentxu~~; ~~Julio~~; ~~Javier~~	Mirentxu; Liz; Gisela	Almudena (2)	Mirentxu; Julio; Javier	Julio; Javier; Liz	Julio; Liz; Iván	Liz; Iván	Runner-up (Day 124)		38
Almudena	No nominations	Ana, Carlos H	Raquel, Iván	Ana, Jie Li	In GH 10; House		Javier; Iván; Nani	Nani; Mirentxu; Javier	Nani; Loli; Mirentxu	~~Nani~~; ~~Mirentxu~~; ~~Javier~~	Mirentxu; Javier; Orlando	Iván (3)	Mirentxu; Javier; Julio	Javier; Liz; Julio	Liz; Orlando; Julio	Liz; Orlando	Third place (Day 124)		38
Liz	Not in House					In GH 1 House		Mirentxu; Javier; Julio	Gisela; Nani; Loli	Nani; Gisela; Mirentxu	Gisela; Orlando; Mirentxu	Julio (2)	Julio; Orlando; Javier	Iván; Javier; Julio	Iván; Almudena; Julio	Orlando; Iván	Evicted (Day 117)		51
Julio	No nominations	Eva, Carlos H	Iván, Raquel	Almudena, Gisela	~~Gisela,~~; ~~Javier~~	In GH 1 House		Carlos H Orlando	Loli; Nani; Orlando	~~Gisela~~; ~~Nani~~; ~~Iván~~	Mirentxu; Orlando; Gisela	Mirentxu (2)	Iván; Almudena; Orlando	Orlando; Liz; Iván	Almudena; Iván; Orlando	Evicted (Day 109)			34
Javier	No nominations	Carlos H, Gisela	Gisela, Almudena	Almudena, Gisela	~~Jie Li,~~; ~~Mirentxu~~	In GH 10; House	Iván; Gema; Carlos F	Liz; Carlos H Orlando	Loli; Orlando; Carlos F	~~Almudena~~; ~~Iván~~; ~~Gisela~~	Mirentxu; Orlando; Carlos F	Mirentxu	Almudena; Iván; Orlando	Orlando; Almudena; Iván	Evicted (Day 101)				29
Ana	No nominations	Almudena, Eva	Iván, Raquel	Almudena, Loli	Evicted (Day 24)								In GH 1 House	Exempt	Ejected (Day 101)				5
Mirentxu	No nominations	Carlos H, Eva	Iván, Raquel	Jie Li, Almudena	~~Jie Li,~~; ~~Julio~~	In GH 1 House		Iván; Orlando; Nani	Iván; Orlando; Nani	Iván; Almudena; Nani	Almudena; Iván; Carlos F	Javier (3)	Almudena; Iván; Liz	Evicted (Day 94)					53
Carlos F	In GH 10; House						Iván; Gisela; Javier	Iván; Mirentxu; Javier	Iván; Mirentxu; Loli	~~Iván~~; ~~Liz~~; ~~Almudena~~	Iván; Liz; Mirentxu	Orlando	Evicted (Day 87)						12
Gisela	No nominations	Eva, Iván	Raquel, Julio	Ana, Loli	~~Javier,~~; ~~Mirentxu~~	In GH 10; House	Gema; Nani; Carlos F	Liz; Iván	Liz; Loli; Mirentxu	Liz; Iván; Orlando	Iván; Liz; Mirentxu	Evicted (Day 80)							37
Nani	Not in House					In GH 10; House	Iván; Almudena; Gisela	Iván; Julio; Mirentxu	Loli; Liz; Mirentxu	~~Iván~~; ~~Liz~~; ~~Almudena~~	Evicted (Day 73)								32
Loli	No nominations	Eva, Almudena	Mirentxu, Julio	Ana, Julio	In GH 10; House		Nani; Gisela; Iván	Mirentxu; Liz; Iván	Iván; Mirentxu; Liz	Evicted (Day 66)									24
Carlos H	No nominations	Iván, Almudena	In GH 10; House				Iván; Orlanda; Javier	Iván; Liz; Orlando	Evicted (Day 59)										8
Gema	In GH 10; House						Iván; Gisela; Javier	Evicted (Day 45)					In GH 1 House	Re-evicted (Day 94)					8
Jie Li	No nominations	Carlos H, Gisela	Raquel, Iván	Almudena, Loli	~~Gisela,~~; ~~Julio~~	Evicted (Day 31)													4
Raquel	No nominations	Almudena, Gisela	Mirentxu, Ana	Evicted (Day 17)															6
Eva	No nominations	Gisela, Carlos H	Evicted (Day 10)										In GH 1 House	Re-evicted (Day 94)					5
Germán	No nominations	Evicted (Day 3)																	N/A
Nomination Notes	1	2	3	4	5	6	7	8	none	9	none	10	11	12	13	14	15		
Against public vote	All housemates	Eva, Carlos H	Iván, Raquel	Almudena, Ana, Loli	Gisela, Jie Li	none	Gema, Gisela, Iván	Carlos H, Iván, Liz, Mirentxu	Loli, Nani, Iván	Nani, Iván, Liz	Gisela, Iván, Mirentxu	Carlos F, Liz, Orlando	Almudena, Julio, Mirentxu	Javier, Julio, Liz, Orlando	Almudena, Iván, Julio	Liz, Orlando	Almudena, Iván, Orlando		
Ejected	none													Ana	none				
Evicted	Germán; 22.5% to evict	Eva; 58.6% to evict	Raquel; 50.5% to evict	Ana; 48.3% to evict	Jie Li; 58.6% to evict	Julito; Mirentxu; Fewest votes to move	Gema; 56% to evict	Carlos H 55.2% to evict	Loli; 61.9% to evict	Nani; 69.6% to evict	Gisela; 57.9% to evict	Carlos F 67% to evict	Ana; Winning a game of chance	Javier; 42.5% to evict	Julio; 51.6% to evict	Liz; 51.9% to evict	Almudena; 7.8% to win	Orlando; 22.4% to win	
Evicted	Germán; 22.5% to evict	Eva; 58.6% to evict	Raquel; 50.5% to evict	Ana; 48.3% to evict	Jie Li; 58.6% to evict	Liz; Losing a game of chance	Gema; 56% to evict	Carlos H 55.2% to evict	Loli; 61.9% to evict	Nani; 69.6% to evict	Gisela; 57.9% to evict	Carlos F 67% to evict	Mirentxu; 49.9% to evict	Javier; 42.5% to evict	Julio; 51.6% to evict	Liz; 51.9% to evict	Iván; 69.8% to win		

=== Notes ===
Housemates In Gran Hermano 10 (GH 10) House
Housemates In Gran Hermano 1 (GH 1) House
- ^Note 1: All Housemates in the GH 1 House automatically faced the public vote. Because Orlando received the fewest votes to evict, he moved into the Gran Hermano 10 House with Carlos F and Gema.
- ^Note 2: All members of the Gran Hermano 10 House were exempt from the nominations process. Until further notice, Housemates will nominate two fellow Housemates with each nomination having the same value. Each of these nominations will count as 1 point in the nomination points received column. As Carlos H received the fewest votes to evict, he moved into the Gran Hermano 10 House.
- ^Note 3: All members of the Gran Hermano 10 House were exempt from the nominations process. As Iván received the fewest votes to evict, he moved into the Gran Hermano 10 House.
- ^Note 4: All members of the Gran Hermano 10 House were exempt from the nominations process. As Loli and Almudena received the fewest votes to evict, they moved into the Gran Hermano 10 House.
- ^Note 5: All members of the Gran Hermano 10 House were exempt from the nominations process. Prior to nominations, the members of the GH 1 House conspired together that they would nominate in a way that would make all of them face the public vote. Big Brother decided this was against the rules and voided all nominations. The decision of who faced the public vote was then handed over to the Gran Hermano 10 Housemates. They collectively decided that Gisela and Jie Li would face the public vote. As Gisela received the fewest votes to evict, she moved into the Gran Hermano 10 House.
- ^Note 6: A vote was held to see which of the 3 Housemates left in the GH 1 House should move into the GH 10 House. Javier received the most votes. The Housemates in the GH 10 House then had to choose to let 2 of Javier, Nani and Liz into the GH 10 House, which each of them hidden behind their own door. Dolores opened Javier's door, and Carlos H chose Estefanía's door, meaning they would both be let into the GH 10 House. This left Julio, Liz and Mirentxu in the GH 1 House.
- ^Note 7: Starting with the fifth set of nominations, the rules of the game changed. From now on, Housemates living in the GH 1 House were immune from eviction and Housemates living in the GH 10 House were to nominate each other in the typical 3-2-1 format. However, those who survived a public vote did not move into the GH 1 House. It was originally planned that the Housemates in the GH 1 House would live there alone for the rest of the series, eligible to win.
- ^Note 8: This week, Housemates nominated in one of three different rooms: Green, Blue, and Purple. If Housemates nominated in the Green Room, they nominate in the normal 3-2-1 fashion but then can watch the rest of the Housemates nominate. If Housemates nominated in the Blue Room, they nominated to save. If Housemates nominated in the Purple room, they nominate to evict and can distribute their 6 points over as many Housemates as they like. Almudena, Carlos F, Carlos H, Loli, Nani and Mirentxu nominated in the Green Room. Iván, Lizfanny, and Orlando nominated in the Blue Room. Gisela, Javier, and Julio nominated in the Purple Room. Gisela gave 4 points to Lizfanny and 2 points to Iván. Javier gave 2 points each to Lizfanny, Carlos H, and Orlando. Julio gave 3 points each to Carlos H and Orlando. Orlando was also originally faced the public vote, but Almudena saved him after answering the Hot Phone. Nominations to save are not added or subtracted to the nomination points received column.
- ^Note 9: This week, Housemates were allowed to anonymously cancel each other's nominations. By the end of this process, only the nominations made by Gisela, Liz and Mirentxu stood.
- ^Note 10: This week, Housemates nominated to save. However, they were only allowed to nominate one other Housemate and the value of the save was determined randomly. Almudena and Mirentxu saved for 3 points; Iván, Julio, Liz and Orlando saved for 2 points; and Carlos F and Javier nominated for 1 point.
- ^Note 11: The public were given the option to allow three former Housemates re-enter the House. They could choose between Ana, Loli, Nani, Eva, Gema, Gisela, Jie Li and Raquel. Carlos H and Germán declined to take part in the vote. The three Housemates with the most votes would enter the GH 1 House on Day 87 and live their for one week. Ana, Eva, and Gema received the most votes. On Day 94, Housemates living in the GH 10 House voted for one of three Wise Men to enter the House. Unbeknownst to them, the three returning Housemates were the Wise Men. Ana received the most support and re-entered the House shortly before Mirentxu's eviction.
- ^Note 12: As Ana had only recently re-entered the House, she was exempt from the nominations process this week.
- ^Note 13: Almudena lost her right to nominate and had to choose an ex-Housemate to nominate for her. She chose Gisela. Julio won the right to save a nominated Housemate. He chose to save Liz.
- ^Note 14: As only 4 Housemates remained, they were each only required to nominate two others. These nominations were worth 2 and 1 points. In addition, only the 2 Housemates with the most points would face the public vote.
- ^Note 15: For the final week, the public were voting to win, rather than to evict.

== Blind results ==
Blind results are shown during debate shows on Sundays.

Week	1ºPlace to Evict	2ºPlace to Evict	3ºPlace to Evict	4ºPlace to Evict
1				
2	67.4%	32.6%		
3	50.8%	49.2%		
4	56.9%	30.7%	12.4%	
5	50.1%	49.9%		
6	61.9%	30.0%	8.1%	
8	61.5%	28.3%	6%	4.2%
9	62.9%	28.7%	8.4%	
10	76.7%	17.5%	5.8%	
11	62.4%	27.3%	10.3%	
12	79.4%	17.5%	3.1	
13	59.9%	37.6%	2.5%	
14	38.4%	36.7%	18%	6.9%
15	47.5%	45.4%	7.1%	
16	57.2%	42.8%		
17	67.2%	23.7%	9.1%	

== See also ==
- Gran Hermano (Spain)
