= Gran Hermano (Spanish TV series) season 8 =

Gran Hermano
- Season 8
- Presented by: Mercedes Milá
- No. of days: 106
- No. of housemates: 15
- Winner: Naiala Melo
- Runner-up: Laura Fernández

Release
- Original network: Telecinco
- Original release: 7 September – 21 December 2006

Season chronology
- ← Previous; Season 7 Next → Season 9

The eighth season of the Spanish reality television series Gran Hermano, a Spanish version of the reality show Big Brother, was broadcast over 15 episodes in 2006. The season started on 7 September and finished on 21 December 2006.

The winner was Brazilian-born Naiala Melo, becoming the first foreigner to win Gran Hermano. In addition, for the first time ever the last three finalists were all females.

== Overall ==
This season of Gran Hermano made Telecinco the first broadcaster to reach the eighth season of the Big Brother.

The house was divided into four apartments that were assigned by drawing lots: an individual apartment (Daniel L.); one for two people (Laura F. and Javier); one for five (Laura S., Gemma, Mahme, Daniel R. and Pulpillo); and one for six (Kiko, Marusky, Greta, Kiran, Miriam and Naiala). In this edition the competitors were able to use the immediate nomination, meaning that competitors could nominate at any time of the day and were given six points to distribute as they wished. A competitor could use immediate nomination only once, with no other competitor aware that they had used it. If the competitors did not manage to pass a test they could obtain the budget by winning a "Panic Room" challenge.

The last competitor was chosen at random from among all the initial competitors. The chosen one was Romina, with the number 133, though a mistake was discovered in the drawing since the number chosen was actually 733, number belonging to Laura Sevillano, whom they could locate some days later. Since the mistake had been of the program and not of the competitors, Mercedes Milá said in the following show that there was given to both girls the opportunity to spend the tests both to turn into competitors of the house 8. Romina did not manage to enter the house because she tested positive for cannabis and because the number was actually her mother's and they swapped tickets when the number was announced.

The slogan of this edition was: "you will see everything".

- Naiala and Gemma appeared naked in Interviú (a popular magazine that publishes naked artistic photography featuring famous people).
- Daniel López started to do porn films.
- In 2010, Marusky and Daniel Rubio entered as a couple on "Gran Hermano: El Reencuentro" (All Stars). They were evicted one week later.

== Housemates ==
Housemates	Age	Residence	Occupation	Entered	Exited	Status
Naiala Melo	22	Tenerife	Saleswoman	Day 1	Day 106	Winner
Laura Fernández	23	Asturias	Commercial real estate	Day 1	Day 106	Runner-up
Míriam Constantí	24	Barcelona	Dependent and Lic. In law	Day 1	Day 106	3rd Place
Miguel Ángel Pulpillo	29	Jaén	Farmer	Day 1	Day 105	11th Evicted
Mahme Garrido	25	Jaén	Student and waitress	Day 1	Day 99	10th Evicted
Daniel López	26	Palma de Mallorca	Gardener	Day 1	Day 92	9th Evicted
Daniel Rubio	24	Barcelona	Journalism student	Day 1	Day 85	8th Evicted
Kiran Wolbeek	33	Madrid	Sales manager	Day 1	Day 78	7th Evicted
Javier Robles	29	Madrid	Entrepreneur	Day 1	Day 71	6th Evicted
Greta de Anta	19	Madrid	Unemployed	Day 1	Day 64	5th Evicted
Marusky Perdomo	35	Las Palmas	In charge of a fashion store	Day 1	Day 57	4th Evicted
Kiko Rodríguez	29	Pontevedra	Entrepreneur	Day 1	Day 43	3rd Evicted
Gemma Guzmán	25	Sevilla	Stewardess	Day 1	Day 29	2nd Evicted
Laura Sevillano	27	Cáceres	Administrative	Day 4	Day 15	1st Evicted
Romina Danilo	23	Madrid	N/A	Day 1	Day 4	Ejected

=== Dani Lo./Drovi ===
Daniel López (who they all called DaniLo or Drovi) was 26 years old and he was a gardener. He was from Mallorca. He entered the house on Day 1 and lived always in the individual room. Sometimes he was sharing the room with Naiala, with whom he had a relation of love. Initially he said that they were couple to win the contest, but then he assured that he was in love. He was forming a part of the group of oranges because it was convenient for him, but as the contest advanced he and Naiala formed an own group. He was considered to be a traitor. He used the immediate nomination on week 13 and was head of household two weeks. In the house he broke a finger. He was evicted on Day 92 with the 55,5 %.

=== Dani R. ===
Daniel Rubio (who they all called "El Sucio" (The Dirty one)) was studying journalism when he entered Big Brother. He was 24 years old and he was from Barcelona. He entered the house on Day 1 and lived always in the brown room. He was very friend of Javi and Pulpillo, and he had a relationship with Laura F. in his last weeks on house. He was a leader of the orange group, and he was gliding often how to nominate. He was a very good player but he was rude, bad-mannered and politically incorrect. He was trying always to extract of hinge his housemates to try that they were leaving the contest by their own decision. He was never head of household. He was evicted on Day 85 with the 41,2% and he was received in set by booing. He declared that in Big Brother was not possible to know the people and confirmed that he had made a personage all the time. He also said that the program had manipulated the contest in favour of the blue ones.

=== Gemma ===
Gemma Guzmán was 25 years old and she was from Sevilla. She entered the house on Day 1. She lived always in the orange room. She developed a hatred with Naiala. Also she developed a relationship with Kiko. She was seeming to be the leader of one of both groups of the house until she was eliminated on Day 29 by 57,8 % of the votes. She was never head of household.

=== Greta ===
Greta de Anta was from Madrid. She was the younger contestant of the edition. She entered the house on Day 1 and lived always in the blue room. She had a look rocker and punk. Initially, Javi shammed that he loved her. She was head of household on the third week and saved Laura F. to be nominated. Greta was first to the Diary Room on week 8, and was allowed to exercise the special Nomination twist. She chose to give 3 points each to Daniel R. and Javier. She developed a nice friendship with Kiran, though sometimes she was distrusting him through the fault of the pressure of the contest. Often she had problems with Naiala and Laura F. She was eliminated on Day 64 by 36,8 % of the votes in her second nomination.

=== Javier ===
Javier Robles was 29 years old and he was from Madrid. He entered the house on Day 1 and lived always in the orange room. He was very friend of Laura F., Dani Rubio and Pulpillo. He was a leader of the orange group, and he was gliding often how to nominate. He was rude, bad-mannered and politically incorrect. He was trying always to extract of hinge his housemates to try that they were leaving the contest by their own decision. He was never head of household. Javier was the first to use the immediate nomination. He was allowed to appoint all six of his points to Laura S. Javier again made it to the Diary Room first on the second week and was allowed to split his six points any way he liked. He gave Greta 5 points and Kiko 1 point. He was eliminated by 61,4 % on Day 70. He declared that in Big Brother was not possible to know the people and confirmed that he had made a personage all the time. He also said that the program had manipulated the contest in favour of the blue ones.

=== Kiko ===
Kiko Rodríguez was 29 years old and he was from Pontevedra. He was a businessman and had look of millionaire. He entered the house on Day 1 and lived always in the blue room. He developed a loving relation with Gemma. After she was eliminated, he assumed the leadership of the so-called group "the blue ones". He was protecting Mimi, Mahme and Greta of the enemies. He had many problems with "the orange ones" (Javi, Naiala, Pulpillo, Dani Lopez, Dani Rubio and Laura F..) Sometimes he seemed to be aggressive. He was eliminated on Day 42 by 39,8 % of the votes. He was never head of household.

=== Kiran ===
Kiran Wolbeek was from Ireland but he was living in Madrid. He was 33 years old. He entered the house on the Day 1 and he lived in the blue room until he was expelled on Day 78 by 43,5 % of the votes. During the time that he was in the contest he had problems with Javier and Dani Rubio. After the evictions of Gemma, Kiko and Marusky, he assumed the leadership of the blue room. He was protecting from the enemies Mimi and Mahme and specially Greta, with whom he had a good friendship. He declared that he was giving him disgust how his rivals were competing. He was head of household on week 4 and saved himself from the nomination. He uses the immediate nomination on week 11 and was allowed to split his points anyway he liked. He awarded four points to Pulpillo, and one point each to Daniel López and Laura F. in an attempt of saving what was staying of his group

=== Laura F. ===
Laura Fernández was from Cantabria and was 23 years old when she entered on Big Brother 8. She was a single mother. She entered the house on Day 1 and lived always in the orange room. She was very friend of Javi, Dani Rubio and Pulpillo. She was calling herself The Prima donna. She was the member more warrior of the orange group, but she also was the most coherent and sensible. For a long time it seemed that she was going to gain the contest, but she remained second. She had a relationship with Dani Rubio in his last weeks on house. She said that the program had manipulated the contest in favour of the blue ones.

=== Laura S. ===
Laura Sevillano was 27 years old when she entered on Big Brother 8. She was from Cáceres. She was chosen by drawing by the number 733. After the program was recognizing the mistake on having extracted the winning ball, Laura was located and entered the house on the Day 4. She lived in the brown room until she was expelled on the Day 15 by 54,9 % of the votes. She was the first head of household. She could be saved from the nomination, but she decided to save Mahme declaring that she was not prepared to support the pressure of the contest.

=== Miriam/Mimi ===
Miriam Constantí was from Barcelona. She was 24 years old when she entered on Big Brother 8 and she was licensed in right. She was defined like otaku. She entered on Day 1 and the blue room was assigned to her, where she lived until the end of the contest. She remained third with 17,5 % She always was protected by his friends and she never had direct clashes with anybody. She developed a great friendship with Mahme, and when Mahme was expelled she cried very much. She was head of household on week 10 after having chosen the same flag that Greta chose in the set during her eviction interview. The orange group declared that the program had manipulated the game on having known in advance that Greta would choose the flag of Japan, the favorite country of his friend Mimi.

=== Marusky ===
Marusky Perdomo was from Las Palmas and she was 35 years old when she entered on Big Brother 8. She entered the house on Day 1 and lived always in the blue room until she was expelled on the Day 57 by 53,2 % of the votes in her first nomination. She was never head of household. After the eviction of Kiko and Gemma she assumed the leadership of the blue grup and she started protecting Mimi, Mahme and Greta. She said that often she was feeling alone and that she was not bearing well the pressure of the contest. Her enemies tried that she was losing the nerves stealing clothes and food from her. She demonstrated to be hypochondriac enough.

=== Mahme ===
Mahme Garrido was from Jaén and she was 25 years old when she entered on Big Brother 8. She entered the house on Day 1 and the brown room was assigned to her, though often she was sleeping in the blue room. Mahme was forming a part of the group of the blue ones, but she was trying to remove well with all. After the eliminations of Kiko, Marusky and Kiran, she assumed the post of protecting Mimi of the enemies. She was a mature person and for a long time it seemed that she was going to gain the contest. She was never head of household. She was eliminated on Day 99 in her third nomination by 47% of the votes. She said goodbye of Mimi of dramatic form.

=== Naiala ===
Naiala Melo was born in Brazil but she was living in Tenerife. She entered on Day 1 and the blue room was assigned to her, but sometimes she slept in the individual room with Daniel Lo, with whom she had a relation of love. Initially she said that they were couple to win the contest, but then she assured that she was in love. She was head of household two times and she used the immediate nomination two times to. At the first time, she gave four points to Dani Rubio and two to Laura F. by strategy. The second time, she gave three points to Mahme and other three points to Mimi. She was forming a part of the group of oranges because it was convenient for him, but as the contest advanced she and Daniel L. formed an own group because she was saying to feel insulted by his "friends", who were racist. She was considered to be a traitor. Nonetheless, she won with 54.6%.

=== Pulpillo ===
Miguel Ángel Pulpillo, whom they all called Pulpillo, was 29 years old and he was from Jaén. He was a farmer. He was an extremely ugly person. He entered the house on Day 1 and the brown room was assigned to him, where he lived until he was evictedone day before the final (Day 104). He was very friend of Laura F., Dani Rubio and Javi. He was head of household on week 9 and 12. He was recognized as the mole of the blue group: he was spying on them to spend information to the orange group. He was more polite than his friends, but equally rude. He said that the program had manipulated the contest in favour of the blue ones.

== Nomination table ==
	Week 1	Week 3	Week 5	Week 7	Week 8	Week 9	Week 10	Week 11	Week 12	Week 13	Week 14 Final			Nomination points received
	Week 1	Week 3	Week 5	Week 7	Week 8	Week 9	Week 10	Week 11	Week 12	Week 13	Day 105	Day 106		Nomination points received
Naiala	Gemma; Laura S Mahme	Gemma; Kiko; Greta	Kiko; Greta; Míriam	Míriam; Marusky; Mahme	Kiran; Greta; Mahme	Daniel L Mahme; Míriam	Pulpillo; Laura F Daniel R	Daniel R Laura F	Laura F Pulpillo; Míriam	Mahme; Míriam	No; Nominations	Winner (Day 106)		56
Laura F	Laura S Mahme; Gemma	Gemma; Kiko; Míriam	Míriam; Kiko; Marusky	Marusky; Míriam; Greta	Mahme; Kiran; Greta	Javier; Pulpillo; Daniel R	Pulpillo; Daniel R Kiran	Pulpillo; Daniel R Daniel L	Pulpillo; Daniel L Naiala	Naiala; Mahme; Pulpillo	No; Nominations	Runner-up (Day 106)		74
Míriam	Naiala; Javier; Laura F	Naiala; Kiran; Daniel L	Naiala; Laura F Javier	Kiran; Daniel R Javier	Javier; Laura F Naiala	Mahme; Daniel L Pulpillo	Laura F Daniel R Pulpillo	Laura F Daniel R Pulpillo	Pulpillo; Laura F Naiala	Pulpillo; Laura F Naiala	No; Nominations	Third place (Day 106)		30
Pulpillo	Laura S Greta; Míriam	Javier; Laura F Gemma	Javier; Naiala; Daniel L	Kiran; Marusky; Míriam	Greta; Javier; Kiran	Javier; Daniel R Laura F	Daniel R Laura F Míriam	Daniel R Laura F Mahme	Laura F Mahme; Naiala	Míriam; Laura F Mahme	No; Nominations	Evicted (Day 105)		54
Mahme	Naiala; Javier; Laura F	Kiran; Naiala; Javier	Naiala; Javier; Laura F	Javier; Laura F Naiala	Javier; Laura F Naiala	Míriam; Daniel L Kiran	Daniel R Pulpillo; Laura F	Daniel R Pulpillo; Laura F	Pulpillo; Laura F Daniel L	Pulpillo; Laura F Naiala	Evicted (Day 99)			34
Daniel L	Mahme; Greta; Pulpillo	Gemma; Kiko; Míriam	Kiko; Míriam; Greta	Greta; Mahme; Míriam	Greta; Mahme; Kiran	Naiala; Mahme; Míriam	Laura F Pulpillo; Kiran	Pulpillo; Laura F Mahme	Mahme; Míriam	Evicted (Day 92)				9
Daniel R	Gemma; Mahme; Laura S	Kiko; Daniel L Javier	Míriam; Marusky; Greta	Greta; Kiran; Mahme	Mahme; Greta; Kiran	Pulpillo; Naiala; Laura F	Laura F Pulpillo; Mahme	Laura F Pulpillo; Míriam	Evicted (Day 85)					38
Kiran	Naiala; Pulpillo; Míriam	Laura F Javier; Pulpillo	Laura F Javier; Naiala	Daniel R Javier; Marusky	Naiala; Laura F Javier	Míriam; Naiala; Daniel R	Pulpillo; Laura F Daniel L	Evicted (Day 78)						24
Javier	Laura S	Kiko; Kiran; Gemma	Greta; Kiko	Mahme; Kiran; Pulpillo	Mahme; Kiran; Greta	Pulpillo; Daniel R Laura F	Evicted (Day 71)							50
Greta	Naiala; Javier; Laura F	Naiala; Javier; Daniel R.	Javier; Naiala; Laura F	Daniel R Javier	Naiala; Laura F Javier	Evicted (Day 64)								21
Marusky	Mahme; Pulpillo; Laura F	Naiala; Kiran; Kiko	Javier; Laura F Naiala	Kiran; Daniel R Javier	Evicted (Day 57)									11
Kiko	Laura F Daniel R Pulpillo	Javier; Naiala; Laura F	Laura F Javier; Naiala	Evicted (Day 43)										22
Gemma	Naiala; Javier; Laura F	Naiala; Javier; Laura F	Evicted (Day 29)											18
Laura S	Naiala; Javier; Laura F	Evicted (Day 15)												15
Romina	Ejected (Day 4)													N/A
Nomination Notes	1	none	2	3	none	4	5	6	7	8	9			
Nominated (Pre-HoH)	Laura S Mahme; Naiala	Javier; Kiko; Naiala	Javier; Laura F Naiala	Daniel R Javier; Kiran	Greta; Javier; Kiran; Mahme	Daniel R Javier; Kiran; Laura F	Daniel R Laura F Pulpillo	Daniel R Laura F Pulpillo	Laura F Mahme; Pulpillo	Laura F Mahme; Míriam; Pulpillo	none			
Saved	Mahme	Javier	Laura F	Kiran	Javier	Kiran	Daniel R.	Laura F	Mahme	Míriam	none			
Against public vote	Javier; Laura S Naiala	Gemma; Kiko; Naiala	Greta; Javier; Kiko; Míriam; Naiala	Daniel R Javier; Marusky	Greta; Kiran; Mahme	Daniel R Javier; Laura F	Kiran; Laura F Pulpillo	Daniel R Mahme; Pulpillo	Daniel L Laura F Naiala; Pulpillo	Laura F Mahme; Pulpillo	Laura F Míriam; Naiala; Pulpillo	Laura F Miriam; Naiala		
Ejected	Romina	none												
Evicted	Laura S 54.9% to evict	Gemma; 57.8% to evict	Kiko; 39.8% to evict	Marusky; 53.2% to evict	Greta; 36.8% to evict	Javier; 61.4% to evict	Kiran; 43.5% to evict	Daniel R. 41.2% to evict	Daniel L. 55.5% to evict	Mahme; 47% to evict	Pulpillo; 10.4% to save	Míriam; 17.8% to win	Laura F 27.9% to win	
Evicted	Laura S 54.9% to evict	Gemma; 57.8% to evict	Kiko; 39.8% to evict	Marusky; 53.2% to evict	Greta; 36.8% to evict	Javier; 61.4% to evict	Kiran; 43.5% to evict	Daniel R. 41.2% to evict	Daniel L. 55.5% to evict	Mahme; 47% to evict	Pulpillo; 10.4% to save	Naiala; 54.6% to win		

=== Notes ===
- ^Note 1 : As Javier was the first Housemate to nominate, he was given the ability to put all 6 of his points on one Housemate.
- ^Note 2 : Following Gemma's eviction, Javier was the first to make it to the Diary Room when called on by Big Brother. Because of this, he was allowed to split up his 6 nomination points any way he wanted to. He decided to put 5 points on Greta and 1 point on Kiko.
- ^Note 3 : Following Kiko's eviction, Greta was the first to make it to the Diary Room when called on by Big Brother. Because of this, she was allowed to split up her 6 nomination points any way she wanted to. She decided to put 3 points each on Dam and Javier.
- ^Note 4 : This week, Housemates were nominated to save. The three or more Housemates with the least support faced the public vote.
- ^Note 5 : Kiran reached the Diary Room first and was allowed to split his 6 points any way he pleased. He chose to put 4 points on Pulpillo, 1 point on Laura F, and 1 point on Drovi.
- ^Note 6 : Naiala reached the Diary Room first and was allowed to split her 6 points any way she pleased. She chose to put 4 points on Dam and 2 points on Laura F.
- ^Note 7 : Drovi reached the Diary Room first and was allowed to split his 6 points any way he pleased. He chose to put 5 points on Mahme and 1 point on Miriam.
- ^Note 8 : Naiala reached the Diary Room first and was allowed to split her 6 points any way she pleased. She chose to put 3 points each on Mahme and Miriam.
- ^Note 9 : For the final week, the public were voting for who they wanted to win, rather than evict. On the day before the final, Pulpillo was evicted after receiving the fewest votes thus far. The lines then re-opened for Laura F, Miriam, and Naiala.
