= La Isla de los FamoS.O.S. 1 =

- Season 1
- Presented by: Alonso Caparrós
- No. of days: 36
- No. of castaways: 9
- Winner: Daniela Cardone
- Runner-up: Ismael Beiro
- Location: Samaná, Dominican Republic
- No. of episodes: 12

Release
- Original network: Antena 3
- Original release: January 23 – February 27, 2003

Season chronology
- ← Previous; 2001 Next → La Isla de los FamoS.O.S. 2

La Isla de los FamoS.O.S. 1 is the first season of the show La isla de los famoS.O.S. and the third overall season of Supervivientes to air in Spain. It was broadcast on Antena 3 from January 23, 2003, to February 27, 2003. This season took place in the Dominican Republic.

Ultimately, it was Daniela Cardone, an Argentine-born model, who beat out Ismael Beiro, the winner from Gran Hermano 1, and journalist Miguel Temprano for the €60,000 grand prize.

== Format changes ==
Beginning with this season there was a dramatic change in the format of the Spanish version of Survivor.

- First, instead of the contestants being mainly regular citizens, they were celebrities or former contestants of previous reality shows.
- Second, instead of tribal council elimination votes, contestants nominated other contestants for eviction through nominations and a leader appointed nominee(s) and the public decided who would be eliminated from the game.
- Third, as opposed to any of the previous seasons (as well as any that followed), this season only had eight initial contestants competing for the prize money with a ninth (María José Besora) entering following the voluntary exit of Nani Gaitán.

== Finishing order ==
Contestant	Famous For	Finish
Máximo Valverde; 58, Sevilla	Actor	1st Voted Out; Day 8
Nani Gaitán; 27, Córdoba	Television host and model	Left Competition; Day 8
Paola Santoni; 34, Federal District	Actress	2nd Voted Out; Day 15
María José Besora; 27, Murcia	Miss Spain 1998	3rd Voted Out; Day 22
Alejandra Prat; 25, Madrid	Television host	4th Voted Out; Day 29
Pablo Martín; 25, Albacete	Míster Spain 2001	5th Voted Out; Day 34
Miguel Temprano; 39, Madrid	Journalist	Third Place; Day 36
Ismael Beiro; 27, Cádiz	Gran Hermano 1 winner	Runner-Up; Day 36
Daniela Cardone; 38, Madrid	Model	Sole Survivor; Day 36

== Nominations table ==
	Week 1	Week 2	Week 3	Week 4	Week 5	Final
Daniela	Nani	Paola	María José	Ismael	Miguel	Sole Survivor (Day 36)
Daniela	Nani	Miguel	María José	Ismael	Miguel	Sole Survivor (Day 36)
Ismael	Nani	Paola	María José	Daniela	Daniela	Runner-Up (Day 36)
Ismael	Máximo	Paola	María José	Alejandra	Pablo	Runner-Up (Day 36)
Miguel	Nani	Paola	María José	Pablo	Daniela	Third Place (Day 36)
Pablo	Nani	Miguel	María José	Miguel	Miguel	Eliminated (Day 34)
Alejandra	Nani	Paola	María José	Pablo	Eliminated (Day 29)	
Alejandra	Nani	Paola	Pablo	Pablo	Eliminated (Day 29)	
María José	Not in the game	Miguel	Alejandra	Eliminated (Day 22)		
Paola	Nani	Miguel	Eliminated (Day 15)			
Nani	Máximo	Left Competition (Day 8)				
Máximo	Nani	Eliminated (Day 8)				
Nomination Notes	See notes 1, 2	See notes 3, 4	See notes 5, 6	See notes 7, 8	See note 9	See note 10
Nominated by Tribe	Nani	Paola	María José	Pablo	Daniela	None
Nominated by Captain	Máximo	Miguel	Pablo	Alejandra	Pablo	None
Nominated	Máximo; Nani	Miguel; Paola	María José; Pablo	Alejandra; Pablo	Daniela; Pablo	Daniela; Ismael; Miguel
Eliminated	Máximo; 84% to eliminate	Paola; 59% to eliminate	María José; 66% to eliminate	Alejandra; 77% to eliminate	Pablo; 50.9% to eliminate	Miguel; Fewest votes (Out of 3)
Eliminated	Máximo; 84% to eliminate	Paola; 59% to eliminate	María José; 66% to eliminate	Alejandra; 77% to eliminate	Pablo; 50.9% to eliminate	Ismael; 20.6% to win
Eliminated	Máximo; 84% to eliminate	Paola; 59% to eliminate	María José; 66% to eliminate	Alejandra; 77% to eliminate	Pablo; 50.9% to eliminate	Daniela; 79.4% to win

- ^Note 1: As the winner of the first immunity challenge, Miguel could not be nominated for elimination.
- ^Note 2: As the winner of the first leadership challenge, Ismael was given the power to name a second nominee for elimination.
- ^Note 3: As the previous leader, Ismael could not be nominated for elimination through normal nominations.
- ^Note 4: As the winner of the second leadership challenge, Daniela was given the power to name a second nominee for elimination.
- ^Note 5: As the previous leader, Daniela could not be nominated for elimination through normal nominations.
- ^Note 6: As the winner of the third leadership challenge, Alejandra was given the power to name a second nominee for elimination.
- ^Note 7: As the previous leader, Alejandra could not be nominated for elimination through normal nominations.
- ^Note 8: As the winner of the fourth leadership challenge, Ismael was given the power to name a second nominee for elimination.
- ^Note 9: As the previous leader, Ismael could not be nominated for elimination and could the first nominee in the event of a nominations tie as well as the second nominee.
- ^Note 10: The lines were open to vote for the winner.
