= Gran Hermano (Spanish TV series) season 1 =

Gran Hermano
- Season 1
- Presented by: Mercedes Milá
- No. of days: 90
- No. of housemates: 14
- Winner: Ismael Beiro
- Runner-up: Ania Iglesias

Release
- Original network: Telecinco
- Original release: 23 April – 21 July 2000

Season chronology
- Next → Season 2

The reality franchise Big Brother debuted in Spain on April 23, 2000, and ended on July 21, 2000, lasting 90 days. This was the third version of Big Brother in global, Netherlands and Germany having aired their editions prior to the Spanish edition. The show was hosted by Mercedes Milá and broadcast on Telecinco.

Ismael was in La Isla de los FamoS.O.S. 1 on 2003.

Israel and Jorge were in Hotel Glam on 2003.

In the 2004 season Gran Hermano VIP 1, Iñigo returned to the house.

In the 2010 season Gran Hermano: El Reencuentro (All-Stars), María José, Silvia and Jorge returned to the house.

== Summary ==
Start Date: April 23, 2000 End Date: July 21, 2000

Duration: 90 days

The Finalists: 3 - Ismael (The Winner), Ania (Runner-up) and Iván (3rd)

Evicted Housemates: 7 - Koldo (4), Mabel (5), Iñigo (6), Marina (7), Vanessa (8), Israel (9), Maria Jose (10)

Voluntary Exits: 4 - Jorge, Mónica, Nacho and Silvia

== Contestants in eviction order ==
Housemates	Age	Residence	Occupation	Entered	Exited	Status
Ismael Beiro	25	Cádiz	Student	Day 1	Day 90	Winner
Ania Iglesias	29	Valladolid	Model	Day 1	Day 90	Runner-up
Iván Armesto	26	Madrid	Business student	Day 1	Day 90	3rd Place
Koldo Sagastizábal	21	San Sebastián	Political sciences student	Day 32	Day 88	7th Evicted
Mabel Garrido	34	Cuenca	Nursing assistant	Day 53	Day 81	6th Evicted
Iñigo González	23	Ceuta	Student	Day 32	Day 67	5th Evicted
Marina Díez	22	Madrid	Telemarketer	Day 1	Day 53	4th Evicted
Mónica Ruíz	24	Palma de Mallorca	Ship stewardess	Day 32	Day 44	Walked
Vanessa Pascual	19	Pamplona	Baker	Day 1	Day 39	3rd Evicted
Jorge Berrocal	25	Zaragoza	Former military	Day 1	Day 29	Walked
Nacho Rodríguez	28	Salamanca	Doctor	Day 1	Day 27	Walked
Silvia Casado	24	Málaga	Hairdresser	Day 1	Day 25	Walked
Israel Pita	24	Orense	Opponent	Day 1	Day 25	2nd Evicted
María José Galera	30	Sevilla	Waitress	Day 1	Day 11	1st Evicted

== Nominations Table ==
	Week 1	Week 3	Week 5	Week 7	Week 9	Week 11	Week 12	Week 13 Final		Nominations received
Ismael	Marina; Iván	Silvia; Israel	Iván; Marina	Marina; Koldo	Koldo; Mabel	Koldo; Mabel	Koldo; Ania	Winner (Day 90)		12
Ania	María José, Vanessa	Iván, Vanessa	Iván, Ismael	Iñigo, Iván	Iñigo, Iván	Iván, Ismael	Iván, Ismael	Runner-up (Day 90)		12
Iván	Marina, Ania	Silvia, Israel	Vanessa, Marina	Marina, Ismael	Ismael, Koldo	Ismael, Koldo	Ismael, Koldo	Third place (Day 90)		15
Koldo	Not in House		Exempt	Ania, Iñigo	Mabel, Ania	Mabel, Ania	Ania, Iván	Evicted (Day 88)		8
Mabel	Not in House				Ania, Iñigo	Ania, Iván	Evicted (Day 81)			4
Iñigo	Not in House		Exempt	Iván, Ismael	Iván, Ismael	Evicted (Day 67)				4
Marina	Ania, María José	Silvia, Israel	Ania, Vanessa	Koldo, Ania	Evicted (Day 53)					6
Mónica	Not in House		Exempt	Walked (Day 44)						N/A
Vanessa	Silvia, Nacho	Silvia, Israel	Ania, Ismael	Evicted (Day 39)						6
Jorge	Israel, Ismael	Silvia, Israel	Walked (Day 29)							2
Nacho	Silvia, Jorge	Silvia, Israel	Walked (Day 27)							3
Silvia	Jorge, Israel	Iván, Vanessa	Walked (Day 25)							8
Israel	Ismael, Iván	Iván, Nacho	Evicted (Day 25)							8
María José	Vanessa, Nacho	Evicted (Day 11)								2
Nomination notes	none		1	none				2		
Nominated for eviction	Ania, Ismael, Israel, Iván, Jorge, María José, Marina, Nacho, Silvia, Vanessa	Israel, Silvia	Ania, Ismael, Iván, Marina, Vanessa	Ania, Iñigo, Ismael, Iván, Koldo, Marina	Ania, Iñigo, Ismael, Iván, Koldo, Mabel	Ania, Ismael, Iván, Koldo, Mabel	Ania, Ismael, Iván, Koldo	Ania, Ismael, Iván		
Walked	none	Silvia	Nacho, Jorge	Mónica	none					
Evicted	María José; 28.52% to evict	Israel; 50.31% to evict	Vanessa; 46.84% to evict	Marina; 34.54% to evict	Iñigo; 56.20% to evict	Mabel; 61.86% to evict	Koldo; 32.23% to evict	Iván; 19.11% to win	Ania; 39.47% to win	
Evicted	María José; 28.52% to evict	Israel; 50.31% to evict	Vanessa; 46.84% to evict	Marina; 34.54% to evict	Iñigo; 56.20% to evict	Mabel; 61.86% to evict	Koldo; 32.23% to evict	Ismael; 41.42% to win		

=== Notes ===
- ^Note 1: As new Housemates; Iñigo, Koldo, and Mónica were exempt from the nominations process this week.
- ^Note 2: This week, the public were voting for a winner, rather than to evict.

== See also ==
- Main Article about the show
