= El Reencuentro season 2 =

El Reencuentro
- Season 2
- Presented by: Jordi González
- No. of days: 47
- No. of housemates: 23
- Winner: Juan Miguel Martínez & Yola Berrocal
- Runner-up: Jorge Lecumberri & Lara Estevan

Release
- Original network: Telecinco
- Original release: 17 March – 2 May 2011

Season chronology
- ← Previous; Season 1

El Reencuentro 2011, also known as El Reencuentro: diez años después premiered on 17 March 2011 and ended on 2 May 2011 lasting 47 days. It is the second season for the reality show El Reencuentro. In this season, there are contestants of several famous realities from Telecinco. Seven pairs of ex-contestants with unfinished business (fights, love, etc.) from different reality shows (Gran Hermano, Gran Hermano VIP, Operación Triunfo, Supervivientes, Hotel Glam, La Casa de tu vida and Las Joyas de la Corona) are reunited and must live and fight together for the award.

== Housemates ==
=== Alejandro, "Coyote Dax" ===
Alejandro entered the house on Day 1. He was a housemate from Gran Hermano VIP 1.

=== Chari ===
Chari entered the house on Day 1. She was a housemate from Gran Hermano 12. Chari was ejected along with Rubén on Day 10 as they had a big argument which the producers considered an aggression.

=== Almudena, "Chiqui" ===
Chiqui entered the house on Day 1. She was a housemate from Supervivientes 2007. Chiqui was ejected on Day 30 as she had a big argument with Natalia in which Chiqui grabbed her arm; this was considered an aggression.

=== David ===
David entered the house on Day 8. He was a housemate from La Casa de tu Vida 1. David was evicted along with Natalia on Day 36 after a housemate nomination with 3 of 3 votes.

=== Gerardo ===
Gerardo entered the house on Day 1. He was a housemate from Gran Hermano 11 Gerardo left the house on Day 20 as he felt uncomfortable his last week in the house.

=== Iván ===
Iván entered the house on Day 15. He was the winner of Gran Hermano 10. Iván became along with Loli the fifth pair to be evicted from El reencuentro on Day 43.

=== Javián ===
Javián entered the house on Day 36. He was a contestant from Supervivientes 2007 and Operación Triunfo. He was the last evictee along with Sofía on Day 43.

=== Jorge ===
Jorge entered the house on Day 1. He was a housemate from Las Joyas de la Corona.

=== Juanma ===
Juanma entered the house on Day 1. He was a housemate from La Casa de tu Vida 1. He became along Mónica the first housemate/pair to be evicted from El Reencuentro.

=== Juan Miguel ===
Juan Miguel entered the house on Day 1. He was a housemate from Hotel Glam.

=== Lara ===
Lara entered the house on Day 1. She was a housemate from Las Joyas de la Corona.

=== Loli ===
Loli entered the house on Day 15. She was a housemate from Gran Hermano 10. Loli became along with Iván the 5th pair to be evicted from El Reencuentro on Day 43.

=== Marta ===
Marta entered the house on Day 1. She was a housemate from Gran Hermano 2 and Gran Hermano VIP 1.

=== Mónica ===
Mónica entered the house on Day 1. She was a housemate from La Casa de tu Vida 1. She became along Juanma the first housemate/pair to be evicted from El Reencuentro.

=== Natalia ===
Natalia entered the house on Day 8. She was a housemate from La Casa de tu Vida 1. Natalia was evicted along with David on Day 36 after a housemate nomination with 3 of 3 votes.

=== Oliver ===
Oliver entered the house on Day 22. He was a contestant from Muejeres y Hombres y Viceversa 1. Oliver and Tamara were evicted on Day 29 after one week in the house.

=== Rubén ===
Rubén entered the house on Day 1. He was a housemate from Gran Hermano 12. Rubén was ejected along with Chari on Day 10 as they had a big argument which the producers considered an aggression.

=== Saray ===
Saray entered the house on Day 1. She was a housemate from Gran Hermano 11 She was ejected on Day 22 due to Gerardo left the house two days before.

=== Sofía ===
Sofía entered the house on Day 1. She was a housemate from Supervivientes 2007. She was the last evictee along with Javián on Day 43.

=== Tamara ===
Tamara entered the house on Day 22. She was a contestant from Muejeres y Hombres y Viceversa 1. Oliver and Tamara were evicted on Day 29 after one week in the house.

=== Vanessa ===
Vanessa entered the house on Day 8. She was a housemate from La Casa de tu Vida 1. She was evicted on Day 15 with Verónica.

=== Verónica ===
Verónica entered the house on Day 8. She was a housemate from La Casa de tu Vida 1. She was evicted on Day 15 with Vanessa.

=== Yola ===
Yola entered the house on Day 1. She was the winner from Hotel Glam.

== Nominations table ==
	Week 1	Week 2	Week 3	Week 4	Week 5	Week 6	Week 7 Final		Votes received
Juan Miguel & Yola	Nominated	Vanessa & Verónica	No; Nominations	Oliver & Tamara	David & Natalia	Javián & Sofía	Winners (Day 47)		0
Jorge & Lara	Juanma & Mónica	Vanessa & Verónica	No; Nominations	Nominated	David & Natalia	Iván & Loli	Runners-up (Day 47)		2
Coyote & Marta	Juanma & Mónica	Nominated	No; Nominations	Oliver & Tamara	Nominated	Nominated	Third Place (Day 47)		0
Sofía	Juanma & Mónica	Gerardo & Saray	No; Nominations	Nominated	Nominated	Nominated	Evicted (Day 43)		1
Javián	Not in House				Nominated	Nominated	Evicted (Day 43)		1
Iván & Loli	Not in House	Exempt	No; Nominations	Jorge & Lara	David & Natalia	Nominated	Evicted (Day 43)		1
David & Natalia	Exempt	Gerardo & Saray	No; Nominations	Jorge & Lara	Nominated	Evicted (Day 36)			3
Chiqui	Juanma & Mónica	Gerardo & Saray	No; Nominations	Nominated	Ejected (Day 30)				0
Oliver & Tamara	Not in House		Exempt	Nominated	Evicted (Day 29)				3
Saray	Nominated	Nominated	Ejected (Day 22)						3
Gerardo	Nominated	Nominated	Walked (Day 20)						3
Vanessa & Verónica	Exempt	Nominated	Evicted (Day 15)						3
Chari & Rubén	Gerardo & Saray	Ejected (Day 10)							0
Juanma & Mónica	Nominated	Evicted (Day 8)							3
Notes	^{1}	^{2}	^{3}, ^{4}	^{5}, ^{6}	none	^{7}	^{8}		
Nominated for eviction	Gerardo & Saray; Juanma & Mónica; Juan Miguel & Yola	Coyote & Marta; Gerardo & Saray; Vanessa & Verónica	~~Chiqui & Sofía~~; ~~Coyote & Marta~~; ~~Gerardo & Saray~~	Chiqui & Sofía; Jorge & Lara; Oliver & Tamara	Coyote & Marta; David & Natalia; Javían & Sofía	Coyote & Marta; Iván & Loli; Javián & Sofía	Coyote & Marta; Jorge & Lara; Juan Miguel & Yola		
Walked	none		Gerardo	none					
Ejected	none	Chari; Rubén	Saray	none	Chiqui	none			
Evicted	Juanma & Mónica; 3 of 4 votes to evict	Vanessa & Verónica; 3 of 5 votes to evict	Eviction; Cancelled	Oliver & Tamara; 3 of 5 votes to evict	David & Natalia; 3 of 3 votes to evict	Iván & Loli; 1 of 2 votes to evict	Coyote & Marta; 11.7% to win	Jorge & Lara; 34.2% to win	
Evicted	Juanma & Mónica; 3 of 4 votes to evict	Vanessa & Verónica; 3 of 5 votes to evict	Eviction; Cancelled	Oliver & Tamara; 3 of 5 votes to evict	David & Natalia; 3 of 3 votes to evict	Javián & Sofía; 1 of 2 votes to evict	Juan Miguel & Yola; 54.1% to win		

=== Notes ===
- ^1 For the first round of nominations, the public was voting for the top four pairs to be immune from being nominated for eviction. The three pairs with the fewest save votes from the public will face possible eviction as the immune housemates/pairs will decide to either evict or save them. Juanma and Mónica, Gerardo and Saray, and Juan Miguel and Yola received the fewest public votes, hence were nominated for eviction. Also David and Natalia and Vanessa and Verónica entered as new housemates/pairs.
- ^2 The public was voting for the three pairs to be nominated for eviction. The three pairs with the fewest save votes from the public will face possible eviction as the immune housemates/pairs will decide to either evict or save them. Coyote and Marta, Gerardo and Saray, and Vanessa and Verónica received the fewest public votes, hence were nominated for eviction. As there was a tie between Gerardo and Saray, and, Vanessa and Verónica, the pair with most public votes, Jorge & Lara had their vote to evict counted as a double vote. Also Iván and Loli entered as new housemates/pairs.
- ^3 Saray was ejected on Day 22 as Gerardo left the house two days before. The rules point that if one member of a pair leaves, the other member must leave the house.
- ^4 This round the three pairs with the fewest votes were Chiqui and Sofía, Coyote and Marta, and Gerardo and Saray. The eviction was cancelled because Gerardo left the house and Saray was ejected.
- ^5 Last week Coyote & Marta won immunity for this week.
- ^6 There was a tie between Jorge and Lara, and, Oliver and Tamara, the pair with most public votes, Juan Miguel and Yola, had their vote to evict counted as a double vote.
- ^7 For this week's eviction, the three pairs with the fewest votes were nominated for eviction and the two saved pairs were asked as to the two pairs they wanted to evict.
- ^8 As of the conclusion of the Gala of Week 6 and all of Week 7, the public is voting for the Housemates-pair they want to win.
