= Gran Hermano (Spanish TV series) season 5 =

Gran Hermano
- Season 5
- Presented by: Mercedes Milá
- No. of days: 113
- No. of housemates: 13
- Winner: Nuria Yáñez
- Runner-up: David Galiardo

Release
- Original network: Telecinco
- Original release: 21 September 2003 – 11 January 2004

Season chronology
- ← Previous; Season 4 Next → Season 6

Gran Hermano 5 is the fifth season of the reality television series Gran Hermano which was broadcast in Spain on Telecinco and La Siete and produced by Endemol. Season 5 lasted for 113 days from September 21, 2003 to January 11, 2004. Nuria Yáñez emerged as the winner.

== Summary ==
Start Date: September 21, 2003 End Date: January 11, 2004

Duration: 113 days

The Finalists: 3 - Nuria "Fresita" (The Winner), David (Runner-up) and Julián (3rd)

Evicted Housemates: 10 - Aída, Ainhoa, Beatriz, Carla, Denís, Laura, Luhay, Nico, Ramón and Vanessa

== Future Appearances ==
In 2010, season Gran Hermano: El Reencuentro, Nico and Ainhoa return at the house.

Aída Nízar was in Supervivientes: Perdidos en Honduras in 2011. In 2017, she entered in Gran Hermano VIP 5. And in 2018, she participated in the 15th Italian version of Grande Fratello.

== Contestants in eviction order ==
Housemates	Age	Residence	Occupation	Entered	Exited	Status
Nuria Yáñez	31	Tarragona	Camp receptionist	Day 1	Day 113	Winner
David Gallardo	26	Vizcaya	Musician	Day 1	Day 113	Runner-up
Julián Mejías	26	Tarragona	Plasterer	Day 1	Day 113	3rd Place
Ainhoa Pareja	23	Madrid	Teleoperator and waitress	Day 1	Day 110	10th Evicted
Denís Castellón	29	Pontevedra	Real estate commercial	Day 1	Day 103	9th Evicted
Laura Ureña	21	Madrid	Tourism student	Day 1	Day 96	8th Evicted
Nicola "Nico" di Matteo	32	Santa Cruz	real estate agent	Day 1	Day 89	7th Evicted
Ramón Yáñez	31	Asturias	Wind energy technician	Day 1	Day 82	6th Evicted
Vanessa Galindo	23	Alicante	Saleswoman	Day 1	Day 68	5th Evicted
Beatriz Cárdenas	25	Granada	Ceramist	Day 1	Day 54	4th Evicted
Carla Pinto	23	Pontevedra	Clinical Assistant	Day 1	Day 40	3rd Evicted
Luhay Hamido	20	Ceuta	Chemistry student	Day 1	Day 26	2nd Evicted
Aída Nízar	28	Valladolid	Law student	Day 1	Day 12	1st Evicted

== Nominations Table ==
This Series Housemates Nominated Housemates for 3, 2 and 1 Nomination points (shown in numerical order in the Nomination Box - with 3 points at the top and 1 point at the bottom). The three or more Housemates with the most Nomination Points would face the Public Vote. Each Week the winner(s) of a challenge wins the right to remove 3 Nomination Points from the Housemate(s) of their choice and potentially change the Nomination line-up.

	Week 1	Week 3	Week 5	Week 7	Week 9	Week 11	Week 12	Week 13	Week 14	Week 15	Week 16 Final		Nominations received
Nuria	Laura, Ainhoa, David	Luhay, Julián, Laura	Carla, Julián, David	Julián, Beatriz, Ainhoa	Vanessa, Ainhoa, Ramón	Laura, Julián, Ramón	Laura, Julián, Ainhoa	Ainhoa, Laura, Julián	David, Denis, Julián	Julián, Ainhoa	Winner (Day 113)		77
David	Aída, Nuria, Laura	Laura, Nuria, Beatriz	Beatriz, Julián, Nuria	Beatriz, Ainhoa, Ramón	Vanessa, Ainhoa, Ramón	Ainhoa, Ramón, Julián	Laura, Ainhoa, Julián	Ainhoa, Laura, Julián	Nuria, Denis, Julián	Ainhoa, Julián	Runner-up (Day 113)		39
Julián	Aída, Carla, Nuria	Carla, Nico, Nuria	Carla, Nico, Nuria	Nico, Nuria, David	Nuria, Nico, Vanessa	Nuria, Nico, David	Nuria, Nico, David	David, Nuria, Denis	Ainhoa, David, Denis	Nuria, David	Third place (Day 113)		54
Ainhoa	Aída, Laura, Nuria	Denis, Beatriz, Nico	Nico, Carla, Nuria	Nuria, Nico, David	Denis, Nico, David	Denis, David, Nico	Nico, Denis, David	Denis, Nuria, David	Julián, Denis, David	David, Nuria	Evicted (Day 110)		52
Denis	Aída, Laura, Julián	Ainhoa, Vanessa, Ramón	Beatriz, Vanessa, Ramón	Vanessa, Ainhoa, Beatriz	Ainhoa, Vanessa, Ramón	Julián, Ainhoa, Ramón	Ainhoa, Julián, Nuria	Ainhoa, Julián, Nuria	David, Nuria, Julián	Evicted (Day 103)			33
Laura	Nuria, Luhay, Carla	Nico, Ainhoa, Carla	Carla, Nico, Nuria	Nuria, Ainhoa, Nico	Nuria, Vanessa, Nico	Nuria, Nico, David	Nuria, Nico, David	Nuria, David, Ainhoa	Evicted (Day 96)				35
Nico	Julián, Luhay, Nuria	Julián, Luhay, Nuria	Ramón, Julián, Beatriz	Julián, Ainhoa, Ramón	Vanessa, Ainhoa, Ramón	Julián, Ramón, Laura	Julián, Laura, Ainhoa	Evicted (Day 89)					53
Ramón	Aída, Laura, Vanessa	Luhay, Beatriz, Denis	Beatriz, Nico, David	Nuria, David, Denis	Denis, David, Nico	David, Nuria, Nico	Evicted (Day 82)						18
Vanessa	Carla, Laura, Nuria	Beatriz, Denis, Luhay	Nico, Carla, Nico	Nuria, Nico, Denis	Nico, Denis, David	Evicted (Day 68)							24
Beatriz	Nuria, Denis, Ramón	Nico, Nuria, Ainhoa	Nico, Nuria, David	Nuria, David, Nico	Evicted (Day 54)								17
Carla	Aída, Denis, Nuria	Julián, Laura, Beatriz	Laura, Vanessa, Beatriz	Evicted (Day 40)									27
Luhay	Aída, Nuria, Laura	Ainhoa, Carla, Nico	Evicted (Day 26)										13
Aída	Julián, Carla, Ainhoa	Evicted (Day 12)											21
Nomination Notes	1	2	3	4	5	6	7	8	9	10	11		
Nominated (pre-Three Point Twist)	Aída, Nuria, Laura	Ainhoa, Beatriz, Luhay, Nico	Beatriz, Carla, Nico	Ainhoa, Nico, Nuria	Ainhoa, Nico, Vanessa	David, Julián, Nuria	Ainhoa, Julián, Laura, Nuria, Nico	Ainhoa, David, Nuria	Ainhoa, Julián, Nuria	Ainhoa, David, Julián, Nuria	none		
Three Point Twist Winner	Carla	Laura	Ramón	Ramón	Denis	Nico	Julián	Nuria	Denis	David	none		
Three Point Twist Winner	Carla	Nico	Julián	Ramón	David, Denis, Julián.	Nico	Julián	Nuria	Denis	David	none		
Three Point Twist	Nuria	Beatriz	Beatriz	Ainhoa	Nico	Nuria	Laura	David	Nuria	Nuria	none		
Three Point Twist	Nuria	Ainhoa	Beatriz	Julián	Denis	Nuria	Laura	David	Nuria	Nuria	none		
Nominated	Aída, Nuria, Laura	Julián, Luhay, Nico	Carla, Nico, Nuria	Ainhoa, Beatriz, David, Nico, Nuria	Ainhoa, Nico, Nuria, Vanessa	David, Julián, Nico, Ramón	Ainhoa, Julián, Nuria, Nico	Ainhoa, Denis, Julián, Laura, Nuria	Ainhoa, Denis, Julián	Ainhoa, David, Julián	David, Julián, Nuria		
Evicted	Aída; 60% to evict	Luhay; 83% to evict	Carla; 85% to evict	Beatriz; 78.1% to evict	Vanessa; 33.3% to evict	Ramón; 47.8% to evict	Nico; 36.8% to evict	Laura; 65.1% to evict	Denis; 44.2% to evict	Ainhoa; 38.4% to evict	Julián; 18.6% to win	David; 27.6% to win	
Evicted	Aída; 60% to evict	Luhay; 83% to evict	Carla; 85% to evict	Beatriz; 78.1% to evict	Vanessa; 33.3% to evict	Ramón; 47.8% to evict	Nico; 36.8% to evict	Laura; 65.1% to evict	Denis; 44.2% to evict	Ainhoa; 38.4% to evict	Nuria; 53.8% to win		

=== Notes ===
- ^Note 1: Carla won the challenge and deducted three points from Nuria. This did not affect the Nomination line-up.
- ^Note 2: Ainhoa, Beatriz, Luhay and Nico were originally Nominated, however after competition winners Laura and Nico removed 3 Points from Beatriz and Ainhoa respectively, the Nomination line-up was changed to Julián, Luhay and Nico.
- ^Note 3: Beatriz, Carla and Nico were originally Nominated for Eviction but after competition winners Julián and Ramón both removed three points from Beatriz the line-up was changed to Carla, Nico and Nuria.
- ^Note 4: Ainhoa, Nico and Nuria were originally Nominated. Competition winner Ramón was this week given the chance to change the Nomination line-up twice. The first time he removed three points from Ainhoa, which changed the line-up to Ainhoa, Beatriz, David, Julián, Nico and Nuria. The second time he removed three points from Julián, which changed the line-up to a final line-up of Ainhoa, Beatriz, David, Nico and Nuria.
- ^Note 5: This week's competition winner was Denis, with David and Julián as close runners-up. Therefore, this week, after Ainhoa, Nico and Vanessa were originally Nominated, Denis first removed 3 points from Nico, removing Nico and adding Denis, before David, Denis and Julián removed 3 points from Denis, changing the final line-up to Ainhoa, Nico, Nuria and Vanessa.
- ^Note 6: David, Julián and Nuria were originally Nominated, but after competition winner Nico removed three nomination points from Nuria the line-up was changed to David, Julián, Nico and Ramón.
- ^Note 7: Ainhoa, Julián, Laura, Nauria and Nico were originally Nominated, but Julián then removed three points from Laura and successfully removed her from the Nomination line-up.
- ^Note 8: Ainhoa, David and Nuria were originally Nominated, but after Nuria removed three points from David the line-up was changed to Ainhoa, David, Julián, Laura and Nuria.
- ^Note 9: This Week Housemates Nominated the Housemates they wanted to stay, as opposed to leave. Ainhoa, Julián and Nuria received the least support, but after Denis added three nomination points to Nuria's total the line-up was changed to Ainhoa, Denis and Julián
- ^Note 10: This Week Housemates Nominated for two and one points, and all Housemates initially drew and all faced the Public vote, but after David removed two points from Nuria's score, the final line-up was changed to Ainhoa, David and Julián.
- ^Note 11: For the last three days, the public were voting for a winner, rather than to evict.
