= Gran Hermano (Spanish TV series) season 9 =

Gran Hermano
- Season 9
- Presented by: Mercedes Milá
- No. of days: 110
- No. of housemates: 17
- Winner: Judit Iglesias
- Runners-up: Pamela de los Santos & Conchi de los Santos

Release
- Original network: Telecinco
- Original release: 9 September – 27 December 2007

Season chronology
- ← Previous; Season 8 Next → Season 10

Gran Hermano 9 was the ninth Spanish edition of the reality television show Big Brother. It was launched on September 9, 2007 and ended December 27, 2007, lasting a total of 124 days.

Judit Iglesias was the winner.

In the 2010 season Gran Hermano: El Reencuentro (All Stars), Andalla, Amor, Melania and Piero returned to the house.

Amor later competed as an intruder in the sixth season of Secret Story Portugal. After 54 days, she placed seventh.

== Housemates ==
Housemates	Age	Residence	Occupation	Entered	Exited	Status
Judit Iglesias	31	La Coruña	Sociologist	Day 12	Day 110	Winner
Conchi & Pamela de los Santos	22	Sevilla	Hairdressers	Day 1	Day 110	Runners-up
Rodrigo Urbina	26	Madrid	Business student	Day 1	Day 110	3rd Place
Oliver Pérez	22	Las Palmas	Singer	Day 1	Day 110	4th Place
Ángela Linares	26	Toledo	Voucher seller	Day 1	Day 103	9th Evicted
Eneko Van Horenbeke	28	Vizcaya	Businessman	Day 1	Day 96	8th Evicted
Andalla Mbengue	34	La Coruña	Refrigerator installer	Day 1	Day 89	7th Evicted
Melania Querol	25	Castellón	Law student	Day 1	Day 75	6th Evicted
Amor Romeira	18	Las Palmas	Styling student	Day 47	Day 69	Walked
Amor Romeira	18	Las Palmas	Styling student	Day 1	Day 12	1st Evicted
Piero Righetto	27	Barcelona	Degree in accounting	Day 1	Day 61	5th Evicted
Lucy Gómez	32	Málaga	Estate agent	Day 19	Day 47	4th Evicted
Dadi Mehad	34	Almería	Legionary	Day 1	Day 46	Walked
Karen Delgado	25	Tenerife	Saleswoman	Day 47	Day 54	3rd Evicted
Karen Delgado	25	Tenerife	Saleswoman	Day 1	Day 33	3rd Evicted
Paula Pérez	25	Orense	Sound technician	Day 47	Day 54	2nd Evicted
Paula Pérez	25	Orense	Sound technician	Day 1	Day 19	2nd Evicted
David Corsín "Fleky"	24	Madrid	Plumber	Day 1	Day 18	Walked
Rebeca Franco	24	Málaga	Unemployed	Day 1	Day 7	Walked
Maite Franco	29	Ciudad Real	Administrative	Day 1	Day 4	Walked
Candidate
Agustín	31	Sevilla	N/A	Day 47	Day 54	Evicted
Aramoga Bravo	23	Fuerteventura	Saleswoman	Day 19	Day 26	Evicted

== Nominations Table ==
As with previous series, Housemates nominated 3 other Housemates worth 3, 2, and 1 points.

	Week 1		Week 2	Week 3	Week 4	Week 6	Week 7	Week 8	Week 10	Week 12	Week 13	Week 14	Week 15 Final		Nomination points received
	Fake eviction	Nomination	Week 2	Week 3	Week 4	Week 6	Week 7	Week 8	Week 10	Week 12	Week 13	Week 14	Week 15 Final		Nomination points received
Judit	Not in House		Exempt	Lucy	Oliver; Conchi & Pamela; Lucy	Piero; Melania; Conchi & Pamela	No nominations	Eneko; Andalla; Ángela	Conchi & Pamela; Melania; Amor	Conchi & Pamela; Oliver; Ángela	~~Conchi &~~; ~~Pamela~~; Ángela; Oliver	Ángela; Rodrigo; Conchi & Pamela	Winner (Day 110)		34
Conchi & Pamela	Andalla; Piero	David; Paula; Eneko	Exempt	Lucy	Melania; Lucy; Judit	Melania; Piero; Rodrigo	No nominations	Oliver; Ángela; Andalla	Melania; Amor; Andalla	Andalla; ~~Judit~~; Rodrigo	~~Judit~~; Eneko; Rodrigo	Judit; Rodrigo; Ángela	Runners-up (Day 110)		34
Rodrigo	Not eligible	Conchi & Pamela; Dadi; Ángela	Not eligible	Aramoga	Lucy; Karen; Andalla	Lucy; Judit; Dadi	No nominations	Eneko; Ángela; Oliver	Melania; Amor; Judit	Eneko; ~~Judit~~; Conchi & Pamela	~~Judit~~; Conchi & Pamela; Oliver	Judit; Conchi & Pamela; Oliver	Third place (Day 110)		15
Oliver	Not eligible	Melania; Amor; Dadi	Not eligible	Aramoga	Karen; Lucy; Judit	Melania; Judit; Lucy	No nominations	Conchi & Pamela; Rodrigo; Ángela	Amor; Melania; Judit	~~Judit~~; Eneko; Ángela	~~Judit~~; Eneko; Rodrigo	Judit; Ángela; Rodrigo	Fourth place (Day 110)		24
Ángela	Andalla; Piero	Amor; Rodrigo; Conchi & Pamela	Not eligible	Lucy	Lucy; Karen; Piero	Lucy; Dadi; Oliver	No nominations	Eneko; Rodrigo; Melania	Amor; Andalla; Judit	~~Judit~~; Andalla; Oliver	~~Judit~~; Oliver; Conchi & Pamela	Judit; Oliver; Conchi & Pamela	Evicted (Day 103)		5
Eneko	Not eligible	Melania; Amor; Ángela	Not eligible	Lucy	Melania; Andalla; Ángela	Exempt	No nominations	Rodrigo; Ángela; Conchi & Pamela	Melania; Amor; Andalla	Rodrigo; Ángela; ~~Judit~~	~~Oliver~~; Conchi & Pamela; Judit	Evicted (Day 96)			11
Andalla	Not eligible	In Secret; Room	Melania; Rodrigo; David	Lucy	Oliver; Piero; Rodrigo	Lucy; Conchi & Pamela; Judit	No nominations	Melania; Piero; Judit	Amor; Ángela; Eneko	Conchi & Pamela; Oliver; Rodrigo	Evicted (Day 89)				7
Melania	Andalla; Piero	Eneko; Paula; Oliver	Not eligible	Lucy	Karen; Eneko; Oliver	Conchi & Pamela; Dadi; Lucy	No nominations	Andalla; Piero; Ángela	Rodrigo; Judit; Eneko	Evicted (Day 75)					44
Amor	Andalla; Piero	Paula; Eneko; Dadi	Evicted (Day 12)				In Secret; Room	Exempt	Andalla; Conchi & Pamela; Oliver	Walked (Day 69)					35
Piero	Not eligible	In Secret; Room	Paula; Karen; David	Lucy	Lucy; Conchi & Pamela; Ángela	Lucy; Conchi & Pamela; Judit	No nominations	Andalla; Rodrigo; Melania	Evicted (Day 61)						6
Agustín	Not in House						In Secret; Room	Evicted (Day 54)							0
Lucy	Not in House			Nominated	Rodrigo; Oliver; Piero	Rodrigo; Melania; Piero	Evicted (Day 47)								27
Dadi	Not eligible	Amor; Rodrigo; Oliver	Not eligible	Lucy	In Secret; Room	Melania; Lucy; Andalla	Walked (Day 46)								16
Karen	Andalla; Piero	Dadi; Melania; Paula	Not eligible	Lucy	Oliver; Melania; Rodrigo	Evicted (Day 33)	In Secret; Room	Re-evicted (Day 54)							14
Aramoga	Not in House			Nominated	Evicted (Day 26)										0
Paula	Andalla; Piero	Amor; Melania; Dadi	Not eligible	Evicted (Day 19)			In Secret; Room	Re-evicted (Day 54)							11
David	Not eligible	Amor; Karen; Conchi & Pamela	Not eligible	Walked (Day 18)											5
Rebeca	Andalla; Piero	Amor; Melania; Eneko	Walked (Day 7)												0
Maite	Walked (Day 4)														N/A
Nomination Notes	1		2	3	4	5	6	7	8	9	10	none	11		
Against public vote	None	Amor; Dadi; Melania; Paula	~~David~~; Karen; Melania; Paula; Rodrigo	Aramoga; Lucy	Karen; Melania; Oliver	~~Dadi~~; Lucy; Melania; Conchi & Pamela	Agustín; Amor; Karen; Paula	Conchi & Pamela; Judit; Oliver; Piero	~~Amor~~; Andalla; Conchi & Pamela; Judit; Melania	Andalla; Conchi & Pamela; Eneko; Judit	Conchi & Pamela; Eneko; Oliver	Ángela; Judit; Rodrigo	Conchi & Pamela; Judit; Oliver; Rodrigo		
Walked	Maite	Rebeca	David	none		Dadi	none		Amor	none					
Evicted	Andalla; Women's choice to move	Amor; 48.2% to evict	Paula; 44% to evict	Aramoga; 2 of 12 votes to save	Karen; 45.9% to evict	Lucy; 50.6% to evict	Amor; 58% to return	Piero; 55.6% to evict	Melania; 60.3% to evict	Andalla; 39.68% to evict	Eneko; 54.78% to evict	Ángela; 92.69% to evict	Oliver; 8.6% to win	Rodrigo; 14.1% to win	
Evicted	Piero; Women's choice to move	Amor; 48.2% to evict	Paula; 44% to evict	Aramoga; 2 of 12 votes to save	Karen; 45.9% to evict	Lucy; 50.6% to evict	Amor; 58% to return	Piero; 55.6% to evict	Melania; 60.3% to evict	Andalla; 39.68% to evict	Eneko; 54.78% to evict	Ángela; 92.69% to evict	Conchi & Pamela; 33.6% to win	Judit; 43.7% to win	

=== Notes ===
- ^Note 1: The women has to fake evict two men, they chouse Andalla and Piero. As Andalla and Piero were thought to be evicted, they could not be nominated by their fellow Housemates.
- ^Note 2: Conchi & Pamela were exempt from nominations this week as they passed their secret task of keeping Andalla and Piero hidden in the secret room. As a new Housemate, Judit was also exempt from nominations this week. Because Andalla and Piero passed their secret mission of remaining undetected in the secret room, they were the only Housemates allowed to nominate this week. After the phone lines were opened David decided to walk from the House, his line was therefore closed.
- ^Note 3: Aramoga and Lucy entered the House shortly after Paula's eviction. This week, there will be no nominations. However, at the end of the week, all Housemates will vote on who should stay in the House.
- ^Note 4: As Dadi was in the secret room during nominations, he could not nominate or be nominated by his fellow Housemates.
- ^Note 5: Eneko was exempt from the nominations process this week because he was currently a guest in the Gran Hermano Argentina House. After the phone lines were opened Dadi decided to walk from the House, his line was therefore closed.
- ^Note 6: This week, there were no nominations. However, three previous Housemates (Amor, Karen, and Paula) and one new Housemate (Augustín) entered the secret room. Throughout the entire week, the public voted on who should enter the main House. On Day 54, it was revealed that Amor received the most votes. He then re-entered the House, fully eligible to win.
- ^Note 7: This week, Housemates nominated to save. The three or more Housemates with the least support would face the public vote. Because Amor had only recently returned to the House, she was exempt from the nominations process.
- ^Note 8: Amor, Andalla, and Melania originally faced the public vote. After the phone lines were opened Amor decided to walk from the House on Day 69, her line was therefore closed. It was then decided that the Housemate with the next highest point total would then face the public vote with Andalla and Melania. Because Judit and Conchi & Pamela were tied, they both faced the public vote.
- ^Note 9: This week, each Housemate had a different twist that affected nominations. Ángela's nominations would be revealed to the House. Eneko was nominating to save, as opposed to evict. All nominations Judit received were voided. She then had to choose the Housemate that she thought would receive the fewest points. She would then receive the same points as the person she chose. Judit chose Eneko. Oliver was given the ability to allocate his 6 points in whatever order and amount he chose. However, he chose to stick with the regular 3-2-1 format. Rodrigo had to choose an ex-Housemate that would nominate on his behalf. He chose Melania. Conchi & Pamela, as Head of House, could save one of the nominees.
- ^Note 10: This week, unbeknownst to the Housemates, all nominations cast for 3 points were voided by Big Brother.
- ^Note 11: For the final week, the public voted to win, rather than to evict.

== Blind results ==
Blind results are shown during debate shows on Sundays.

Week	1st Place to Evict	2nd Place to Evict	3rd Place to Evict	4th Place to Evict	5th Place to Evict
2	58.9%	31.1%	5.7%	4.3%	
3	39%	25%	23%	12%	1%
5	43.8%	41.5%	14.7%		
7	55.8%	29.6%	9.2%	5.6%	
8	58.1%	17.6%	12.4%	11.9%	
9	51.3%	20.7%	18.9%	9.1%	
11	64.7%	15.3%	13.1%	6.9%	
13	38.9%	23.1%	20.2%	17.8%	
14	55.9%	29.6%	14.5%		
15	93.2%	3.6%	3.2%		
16	46.3%	29.5%	16.6%	7.6%	
