= Gran Hermano (Spanish TV series) season 3 =

Gran Hermano
- Season 3
- Presented by: Pepe Navarro
- No. of days: 102
- No. of housemates: 13
- Winner: Javito García
- Runner-up: Patricia Ledesma

Release
- Original network: Telecinco
- Original release: 2 April – 14 July 2002

Season chronology
- ← Previous; Season 2 Next → Season 4

The third season of the Spanish Gran Hermano launched on April 4, 2002, with the final on July 14, 2002, lasting 102 days. It is the third Spanish edition of the reality franchise Big Brother. Javito García emerged as the winner, with Patricia Ledesma runner-up and Kiko Hernández third. A total of 9 housemates were evicted: Andrés, Candi, Carolina, Elba, Jacinto, Javier, Jorge, Noemi and Raquel; Óscar voluntarily left the show.

Noemi and Raquel returned to the house in the 2010 Gran Hermano: El Reencuentro (All Stars) season.

== Contestants in eviction order ==
Housemates	Age	Residence	Occupation	Entered	Exited	Status
Javito García	27	Santiago de Compostela	Restaurant entrepreneur	Day 1	Day 102	Winner
Patricia Ledesma	21	Sevilla	Secretary	Day 1	Day 102	Runner-up
Kiko Hernández	25	Madrid	Real estate entrepreneur	Day 1	Day 102	3rd Place
Javier Estrada	26	Barcelona	Singer and tenist	Day 85	Day 99	9th Evicted
Carolina González	25	Santa Cruz de Tenerife	Beauty advisor	Day 1	Day 92	8th Evicted
Candi López	21	Granada	Sports technician	Day 1	Day 85	7th Evicted
Óscar Muela	27	Ciudad Real	Administrative	Day 1	Day 83	Walked
Jorge Mozo	29	Cádiz	Refrigerator technician	Day 1	Day 76	6th Evicted
Elba Guallarte	23	Barcelona	Telemarketer	Day 1	Day 64	5th Evicted
Andrés Barreiro "Ness"	24	Alicante	Businessman and stripper	Day 1	Day 50	4th Evicted
Raquel Morillas	24	Madrid	Administrative	Day 1	Day 36	3rd Evicted
Jacinto Garbayo	38	Navarra	Businessman	Day 1	Day 22	2nd Evicted
Noemí Ungría	29	Barcelona	Beautician	Day 1	Day 8	1st Evicted

== Nominations Table ==
This year Housemates Nominated three Housemates for Eviction, and the three or more Housemates with the most Nominations faced the Public Vote.

	Week 1	Week 3	Week 5	Week 7	Week 9	Week 11	Week 12	Week 13	Week 14	Week 15 Final		Nominations received
Javito	Jacinto, Noemí, Kiko	Jacinto, Kiko, Raquel	Raquel, Carolina, Ness	Andrés, Carolina, Kiko	Carolina, Elba, Jorge	Carolina, Jorge, Candi	Carolina, Candi, Kiko	Javier, Kiko, Carolina	Javier, Kiko	Winner (Day 102)		32
Patricia	Carolina, Ness, Kiko	Jacinto, Ness, Raquel	Carolina, Ness, Raquel	Ness, Carolina, Jorge	Carolina, Elba, Jorge	Carolina, Jorge, Candi	Carolina, Candi, Óscar	Javier, Carolina, Javito	Javier, Javito	Runner-up (Day 102)		32
Kiko	Javito, Noemí, Óscar	Javito, Óscar, Candi	Raquel, Elba, Candi	Elba, Ness, Carolina	Elba, Carolina, Jorge	Óscar, Carolina, Jorge	Carolina, Candi, Óscar	Carolina, Javito, Javier	Javier, Javito	Third place (Day 102)		37
Javier	Not in House							Kiko, Patricia, Javito	Kiko, Patricia	Evicted (Day 99)		6
Carolina	Ness, Kiko, Noemi	Patricia, Óscar, Kiko	Patricia, Javito, Kiko	Javito, Patricia, Kiko	Javito, Patricia, Kiko	Javito, Patricia, Kiko	Patricia, Kiko, Javito	Patricia, Javito, Kiko	Evicted (Day 92)			26
Candi	Patricia, Raquel, Ness	Patricia, Elba, Kiko	Patricia, Kiko, Elba	Patricia, Kiko, Elba	Javito, Patricia, Elba	Patricia, Javito, Kiko	Patricia, Kiko, Javito	Evicted (Day 85)				12
Óscar	Raquel, Kiko, Ness	Raquel, Kiko, Jacinto	Carolina, Raquel, Ness	Ness, Elba, Kiko	Carolina, Elba, Kiko	Kiko, Carolina, Jorge	Carolina, Candi, Kiko	Walked (Day 83)				7
Jorge	Noemí, Carolina, Patricia	Javito, Patricia, Elba	Patricia, Javito, Kiko	Patricia, Kiko, Javito	Kiko, Javito, Patricia	Patricia, Javito, Kiko	Evicted (Day 76)					8
Elba	Ness, Candi, Carolina	Ness, Patricia, Jacinto	Ness, Kiko, Candi	Kiko, Patricia, Candi	Patricia, Javito, Kiko	Evicted (Day 64)						16
Ness	Javito, Noemi, Patricia	Elba, Javito, Patricia	Patricia, Javito, Elba	Kiko, Javito, Patricia	Evicted (Day 50)							14
Raquel	Javito, Candi, Elba	Javito, Óscar, Patricia	Kiko, Patricia, Javito	Evicted (Day 36)								9
Jacinto	Javito, Carolina, Noemi	Patricia, Javito, Elba	Evicted (Day 22)									6
Noemi	Jacinto, Javito, Carolina	Evicted (Day 8)										6
Nomination Notes	none								1	2		
Nominated for eviction	Carolina, Javito, Ness, Noemí	Elba, Jacinto, Javito, Kiko, Patricia	Javito, Kiko, Ness, Patricia, Raquel	Kiko, Ness, Patricia	Carolina, Elba, Javito, Kiko, Patricia	Carolina, Jorge, Kiko	Candi, Carolina, Kiko	Carolina, Javier, Javito, Kiko	Javier, Javito, Kiko	Javito, Kiko, Patricia		
Walked	none						Óscar	none				
Evicted	Noemí; 42% to evict	Jacinto; 40% to evict	Raquel; 73% to evict	Ness; 58% to evict	Elba; 48% to evict	Jorge; 57% to evict	Candi; 47% to evict	Carolina; 46.8% to evict	Javier; 60% to evict	Kiko; 4.69% to win	Patricia; 35.74% to win	
Evicted	Noemí; 42% to evict	Jacinto; 40% to evict	Raquel; 73% to evict	Ness; 58% to evict	Elba; 48% to evict	Jorge; 57% to evict	Candi; 47% to evict	Carolina; 46.8% to evict	Javier; 60% to evict	Javito; 59.57% to win		

=== Notes ===
- ^Note 1: Housemates only nominated two Housemates each this week, as opposed to the normal three.
- ^Note 2: Following Javier's eviction, the public were voting for who they wanted to win, rather than to evict.

== See also ==
- Main Article about the show
