= Gran Hermano (Spanish TV series) season 6 =

Gran Hermano
- Season 6
- Presented by: Mercedes Milá
- No. of days: 110
- No. of housemates: 16
- Winner: Juanjo Mateo
- Runner-up: Conrad Chase

Release
- Original network: Telecinco
- Original release: 5 September – 23 December 2004

Season chronology
- ← Previous; Season 5 Next → Season 7

Gran Hermano 6 is the sixth season of the reality television series Gran Hermano which was broadcast in Spain on Telecinco and La Siete and produced by Endemol. Season 6 lasted for 110 days from September 5, 2004 to December 23, 2004. Juanjo Mateo Rocamora emerged as the winner.

== Summary ==
Start Date: September 5, 2004 End Date: December 23, 2004

Duration: 110 days

The Finalists: 3 - Juanjo (The Winner), Conrad Chase (Runner-up) and Natacha (3rd)

Evicted Housemates: 10 - Beatriz, Cristal, Diana, Eloisa, Eva, Jani, Jonathan, Miguel, Nicky and Salva

Voluntary Exits: 3 - Ángel, Mercedes and Sandra

Mercedes was in Aventura en África on 2005.

In 2010, season Gran Hermano: El Reencuentro (All Stars), Nicky, Cristal and Beatriz return at the house.

Beatriz González-Rico was in Supervivientes: Perdidos en Nicaragua on 2010.

== Contestants in eviction order ==
Housemates	Age	Residence	Occupation	Entered	Exited	Status
Juanjo Mateo	25	Alicante	Taxist	Day 1	Day 110	Winner
Conrad Chase	39	Barcelona	Businessman	Day 19	Day 110	Runner-up
Natacha Jaitt	26	Madrid	Dancer	Day 12	Day 110	3rd Place
Diana Bartolomé	23	Barcelona	Model	Day 1	Day 106	10th Evicted
Jani Pelegrín	29	Logroño	Cosmetics representative	Day 1	Day 103	9th Evicted
Eva Suárez	27	Madrid	Actress	Day 47	Day 96	8th Evicted
Jonathan Pons	25	Barcelona	Financial advisor	Day 1	Day 89	7th Evicted
Nicky Villanueva	30	Asturias	Defense official	Day 1	Day 82	6th Evicted
Beatriz González	23	Madrid	Legionary	Day 1	Day 68	5th Evicted
Miguel Carpio	32	Sevilla	Public relations	Day 1	Day 53	4th Evicted
Sandra Crespo	28	Asturias	Stylist	Day 1	Day 40	Walked
Cristal Fernández	19	Orense	Congress stewardess and waitress	Day 1	Day 40	3rd Evicted
Eloísa Donoso	36	Barcelona	Estate agent	Day 1	Day 26	2nd Evicted
Ángel Díaz	31	Las Palmas	Football coach and businessman	Day 1	Day 16	Walked
Salvador Martí	33	Logroño	Policeman	Day 1	Day 12	1st Evicted
Mercedes García	32	Badajoz	Archaeologist	Day 1	Day 1	Walked

== Nominations Table ==
Housemates could Nominate three other Housemates for three, two and one points. The three or more Housemates with the most Nomination Points will face the Public Vote. Each week the Head of Household (marked in green) has the chance to save a Housemate from the Nomination line-up. If there are only two Housemates nominated after the Head of Household saves someone, the person(s) with the next highest point total will face the public vote as well.

	Week 1	Week 3	Week 5	Week 7	Week 9	Week 11	Week 12	Week 13	Week 14	Week 15			Nomination points received
	Week 1	Week 3	Week 5	Week 7	Week 9	Week 11	Week 12	Week 13	Week 14	Day 103	Day 110 Final		Nomination points received
Juanjo	Cristal; Beatriz; Sandra	Cristal; Eloísa; Beatriz	Sandra; Cristal; Beatriz	Jonathan; Beatriz; Natacha	Beatriz; Nicky; Natacha	Jonathan; Eva; Nicky	Jonathan; Eva; Natacha	Eva; Conrad; Jani	Natacha; Jani; Conrad	Diana; Natacha	Winner (Day 110)		56
Conrad	Not in House		Sandra; Beatriz; Nicky	Beatriz; Miguel; Jonathan	Beatriz; Nicky; Jonathan	Jani; Natacha; Jonathan	Natacha; Jonathan; Jani	Natacha; Jani; Diana	Natacha; Diana; Jani	Natacha; Diana	Runner up (Day 110)		49
Natacha	Not in House	Nicky; Beatriz; Juanjo	Beatriz; Cristal; Sandra	Beatriz; Nicky; Jani	Beatriz; Nicky; Juanjo	Juanjo; Conrad; Jani	Jani; Eva; Jonathan	Conrad; Eva; Juanjo	Conrad; Juanjo; Jani	Conrad; Juanjo	Third place (Day 110)		52
Diana	Ángel; Beatriz; Juanjo	Eloísa; Cristal; Beatriz	Cristal; Beatriz; Sandra	Miguel; Jonathan; Beatriz	Beatriz; Eva; Conrad	Jonathan; Eva; Nicky	Jonathan; Eva; Conrad	Eva; Conrad; Jani	Conrad; Jani; Juanjo	Conrad; Natacha	Evicted (Day 106)		49
Jani	Salva; Cristal; Beatriz	Nicky; Cristal; Natacha	Conrad; Natacha; Nicky	Natacha; Conrad; Beatriz	Beatriz; Natacha; Eva	Nicky; Juanjo; Natacha	Natacha; Conrad; Eva	Conrad; Eva; Juanjo	Juanjo; Diana; Natacha	Evicted (Day 103)			34
Eva	Not in House				Diana; Juanjo; Natacha	Diana; Juanjo; Jani	Natacha; Diana; Juanjo	Juanjo; Diana; Natacha	Evicted (Day 96)				24
Jonathan	Salva; Jani; Cristal	Eloísa; Beatriz; Sandra	Juanjo; Diana; Beatriz	Diana; Juanjo; Conrad	Diana; Conrad; Juanjo	Diana; Conrad; Natacha	Diana; Juanjo; Natacha	Evicted (Day 89)					26
Nicky	Cristal; Beatriz; Ángel	Eloísa; Jani; Cristal	Sandra; Beatriz; Cristal	Natacha; Conrad; Miguel	Diana; Conrad; Juanjo	Diana; Juanjo; Conrad	Evicted (Day 82)						45
Beatriz	Nicky; Jani; Juanjo	Natacha; Eloísa; Jonathan	Conrad; Sandra; Cristal	Juanjo; Natacha; Miguel	Juanjo; Conrad; Diana	Evicted (Day 68)							53
Miguel	Nicky; Salva; Eloísa	Eloísa; Jani; Beatriz	Beatriz; Diana; Juanjo	Juanjo; Diana; Conrad	Evicted (Day 54)								9
Sandra	Nicky; Jani; Juanjo	Eloísa; Natacha; Jani	Juanjo; Diana; Nicky	Walked (Day 40)									18
Cristal	Nicky; Juanjo; Salva	Eloísa; Natacha; Nicky	Juanjo; Diana; Conrad	Evicted (Day 40)									28
Eloísa	Nicky; Cristal; Sandra	Nicky; Miguel; Diana	Evicted (Day 26)										23
Ángel	Nicky; Sandra; Diana	Walked (Day 16)											4
Salva	Jani; Jonathan; Nicky	Evicted (Day 12)											9
Mercedes	Walked (Day 1)												N/A
Nomination Notes	none									1	2		
Nominated (Pre-HoH)	Cristal, Jani, Nicky, Salva	Cristal, Eloísa, Natacha, Nicky	Beatriz, Juanjo, Sandra	Beatriz, Juanjo, Natacha	Beatriz, Diana, Juanjo	Diana, Jonathan, Juanjo	Eva, Jonathan, Natacha	Conrad, Eva, Juanjo	Conrad, Jani, Juanjo, Natacha	Conrad, Natacha	none		
Saved	Cristal	Nicky	Sandra	Beatriz	Diana	Jonathan	Eva	Juanjo	Juanjo	Natacha	none		
Against public vote	Jani, Nicky, Salva	Cristal, Eloísa, Natacha	Beatriz, Cristal, Juanjo	Juanjo, Miguel, Natacha	Beatriz, Conrad, Juanjo	Conrad, Diana, Jani, Juanjo, Nicky	Diana, Jonathan, Natacha	Conrad, Eva, Jani, Natacha	Conrad, Jani, Natacha	Conrad, Diana	Conrad, Juanjo, Natacha		
Walked	Mercedes	Ángel	Sandra	none									
Evicted	Salva; 59.5% to evict	Eloísa; 70.6% to evict	Cristal; 68.1% to evict	Miguel; 51.7% to evict	Beatriz; 78.9% to evict	Nicky; 88.2% to evict	Jonathan; 82.5% to evict	Eva; 86.4% to evict	Jani; 47.55% to evict	Diana; 74.9% to evict	Natacha; 15.2% (out of 3)	Conrad; 27.5% (out of 3)	
Evicted	Salva; 59.5% to evict	Eloísa; 70.6% to evict	Cristal; 68.1% to evict	Miguel; 51.7% to evict	Beatriz; 78.9% to evict	Nicky; 88.2% to evict	Jonathan; 82.5% to evict	Eva; 86.4% to evict	Jani; 47.55% to evict	Diana; 74.9% to evict	Juanjo; 57.3% to win		

=== Notes ===
- ^Note 1 : This Week Housemates Nominated for 2 and 1 points, with the two Housemates with the most Nomination Points facing the Public Vote.
- ^Note 2 : For the last 4 days, the public voted for a winner, rather than to evict.
