= El Reencuentro season 1 =

Gran Hermano: El Reencuentro
- Season 1
- Presented by: Mercedes Milá
- No. of days: 56
- No. of housemates: 28
- Winners: Pepe Herrero & Raquel López
- Runners-up: Jorge Berrocal & Silvia Casado

Release
- Original network: Telecinco
- Original release: 3 February – 30 March 2010

Season chronology
- Next → Season 2

Gran Hermano: El Reencuentro (English: "Big Brother: The Reunion") is the first season of the Spanish reality show El Reencuentro and the first All-Stars season of the reality show Gran Hermano. It premiered on 3 February 2010, and concluded on 30 March 2010.

On 31 January 2010, during the last episode of El Debate for Gran Hermano 11, Gran Hermano host Mercedes Milá confirmed that the Gran Hermano house was going to open again just one week after the finale, this time with the former housemates from previous seasons of Gran Hermano.

The format for this season involves the housemates working in pairs that correspond to the season of Gran Hermano they were previously on. This is similar to the twist used on Big Brother 9 U.S. The show was originally intended to run for only a month but was extended to 56 days due to high ratings. Days 35, 42 and 49, in particular, all received a viewership of under 3 million viewers.

== Format ==
Gran Hermano: El Reencuentro takes place a week after the end of Gran Hermano 11; therefore, the house of this season is the same one used for Gran Hermano 11 with the name of Spy House or "Ecological House". The production and the studio have not experienced any change.

Initially, the contest had to be played by former housemates of Gran Hermano. The housemates needed to have had conflicts or "pending accounts" with somebody from their respective seasons to take part in this All-Stars season. The show presented a new mechanic: work in pairs. In addition, there will be no housemate nominations: the public would save 3 couples on the official website of Telecinco. These 3 couples would choose which couple to evict.

== Housemates ==
Two days after the premiere, Nacho and Desireé walked from the show due to health problems with their son. To replace the couple, and with the purpose of extending the duration of the contest, two new couples entered the game: Pepe and Raquel and Inma and Beatriz, all from Gran Hermano 7.

A week after the premiere, Arturo was ejected from the show for aggressive behavior toward his partner Indhira. The show gave Indhira the opportunity to continue on the show with a new partner or to abandon the show, within 24 hours. After thinking about it, the girl decided to walk away out of fear of having to suffer from her housemates.

Two weeks after the premiere, Bea was ejected for aggressive behavior towards Melania. Nicky continued on the show only until the Gala show, after he received his new partner, Cristal. Nicky and Cristal were evicted during the Gala show.

During week 4's Gala show, Melania and Piero made their decision to walk from the show. Jorge Berrocal and María José Galera, from Gran Hermano 1, entered the house. In the same Gala show, Amor and the Andalla were ejected.

On 11 March, María José decided to leave over a kidney-related problem. Jorge partnered with Silvia.

Housemate	Previous status		Age on entry	Residence	Day entered	Day exited	Status
Housemate	Season	Status	Age on entry	Residence	Day entered	Day exited	Status
Pepe Herrero	Gran Hermano 7	Winner	37	Madrid	7	56	Winner
Raquel López	Gran Hermano 7	Evicted	31	Málaga	7	56	Winner
Jorge Berrocal	Gran Hermano 1	Walked	35	Zaragoza	28	56	Runner-up
Silvia Casado	Gran Hermano 1	Walked	35	Málaga	42	56	Runner-up
Ainhoa Pareja	Gran Hermano 5	Evicted	29	Madrid	1	56	3rd Place
Nico Di Matteo	Gran Hermano 5	Evicted	39	Tenerife (originally from Italy)	1	56	3rd Place
Ana Toro	Gran Hermano 10	Ejected	37	Granada	14	49	7th Evicted
Almudena Martínez	Gran Hermano 10	3rd place	26	Murcia	14	49	7th Evicted
Gema Zafra	Gran Hermano 10	Evicted	27	Barcelona	35	49	6th Evicted
Orlando Breyner	Gran Hermano 10	Runner-up	29	Valencia	35	49	6th Evicted
Daniel Rubio	Gran Hermano 8	Evicted	28	Barcelona	35	42	5th Evicted
Marusky Perdomo	Gran Hermano 8	Evicted	39	Las Palmas	35	42	5th Evicted
María José Galera	Gran Hermano 1	Evicted	42	Sevilla	28	37	Walked
Andallá Mbengue	Gran Hermano 9	Evicted	37	A Coruña (originally from Senegal)	14	28	4th Evicted
Amor Romeira	Gran Hermano 9	Walked	21	Fuerteventura	14	28	4th Evicted
Melania Querol	Gran Hermano 9	Evicted	28	Castellón	1	28	Walked
Piero Righetto	Gran Hermano 9	Evicted	30	Barcelona (originally from Italy)	1	28	Walked
Nicky Villanueva	Gran Hermano 6	Evicted	36	Asturias	1	21	3rd Evicted
Cristal Fernández	Gran Hermano 6	Evicted	27	Ourense	21	21	3rd Evicted
Bea la Legionaria	Gran Hermano 6	Evicted	29	Madrid	1	16	Ejected
Inma Contreras	Gran Hermano 7	Evicted	33	Granada	7	14	2nd Evicted
Beatriz Gómez	Gran Hermano 7	Walked	46	Madrid	7	14	2nd Evicted
Indhira Kalvani	Gran Hermano 11	Ejected	23	Málaga	1	9	Walked
Arturo Requejo	Gran Hermano 11	Evicted	32	Gipuzkoa	1	8	Ejected
Raquel Morillas	Gran Hermano 3	Evicted	33	Madrid	1	7	1st Evicted
Noemí Ungria	Gran Hermano 3	Evicted	37	Barcelona	1	7	1st Evicted
Nacho Utrera	Gran Hermano 4	Evicted	32	Sevilla	1	3	Walked
Desirée Albertalli	Gran Hermano 4	Runner-up	32	A Coruña (originally from Switzerland)	1	3	Walked

=== Ainhoa ===
Ainhoa entered the house on Day 1. She was a housemate from Gran Hermano 5. She and Nico were evicted in the Finale on Day 56 and came out in Third Place.

=== Almudena ===
Almudena entered the house on Day 14. She was a housemate from Gran Hermano 10. Almudena, and her partner Ana, were evicted on Day 49 where upon entering the studio for their interview were welcomed with a winner's reception.

=== Amor ===
Amor entered the house on Day 14. She was the first housemate to be evicted from Gran Hermano 9. Amor was evicted, along with partner Andallá, on Day 28.

=== Ana ===
Ana entered the house on Day 14. She was a housemate from Gran Hermano 10. Ana, and her partner Almudena, were evicted on Day 49 where upon entering the studio for their interview were welcomed with a winner's reception.

=== Andallá ===
Andallá entered the house on Day 14. He was a housemate from Gran Hermano 9. Andallá was evicted, along with partner Amor, on Day 28.

=== Arturo ===
Arturo entered the house on Day 1. He was a Gran Hermano 11 housemate where he had an on-and-off relationship with Indhira. He was ejected on Day 8 after throwing a glass of wine on top of Indhira's food after a fight they had; although Arturo and Indhira were a pair for this show, Indhira stayed in the house until the next day when she decided to voluntarily leave the house.

=== Bea la Legionaria ===
Beatriz González-Rico Cabra entered the house on Day 1. She was on Gran Hermano 6. In the early hours of Day 17, she was ejected after insulting and threatening Melania.

=== Beatriz ===
Beatriz entered the house on Day 7. She was on Gran Hermano 7. She was evicted one week later on Day 14 with partner Inma.

=== Cristal ===
Cristal entered the house on Day 21. She was on Gran Hermano 6. She entered the house to replace Bea, as she was ejected a few days prior and to become Nicky's new partner. After about an hour in the house, Cristal made Gran Hermano history as she became the first housemate to be evicted within the same Gala show, and overall the third pair to be evicted, with Nicky.

=== Dani ===
Dani entered the house on Day 35. He was on Gran Hermano 8. After only one week in the house, he was evicted on Day 42.

=== Desirée ===
Desirée entered the house on Day 1. She was on Gran Hermano 4 where she formed a relationship with Nacho, which ended sometime after their season ended. She walked from the house along with Nacho on Day 3 due to their child's illness.

=== Indhira ===
Indhira entered the house on Day 1. She was a housemate from Gran Hermano 11 where she had an on-and-off relationship with Arturo. After exiting the Gran Hermano 11 House, she started a blog on the official website of Telecinco called El Blog de Indhira (Indhira's Blog). On Day 8, Arturo was ejected after having a confrontation between them and he threw a glass of wine on top of her meal. This decision did not affect her stay in the house at all and she would have received a new partner during the next Gala. On Day 9, she walked out of the House after thinking of who could be her new partner and she said that it would be the right thing to do.

=== Inma ===
Inma entered the house on Day 7. She was a housemate from Gran Hermano 7. She was evicted with partner Beatriz on Day 14.

=== Gema ===
Gema entered the house on Day 35. She was a housemate from Gran Hermano 10. She entered in Gran Hermano 10 with her husband, Carlos F. Gema, and her partner Orlando, were evicted on Day 49.

=== Jorge ===
Jorge entered the house on Day 28. He was a housemate from Gran Hermano 1. On Day 37, his partner Maria José left the house; on Day 42, he got a new partner, Silvia. He and Silvia were evicted in the Finale on Day 56 and came out as the Runners-up.

=== Maria José ===
Maria José entered the house on Day 28. She was the first evictee on Gran Hermano 1. On Day 37, she walked out of the house due to an illness, leaving Jorge as a single competitor until the Gala on Day 42, where Silvia was named as his new partner, also from Gran Hermano 1.

=== Marusky ===
Marusky entered the house on Day 35. She was on Gran Hermano 8. She was evicted one week later, on Day 42.

=== Melania ===
Melania entered the house on Day 1. He was a housemate from Gran Hermano 9 where he formed a relationship with Piero. After months of relationship, they ended the relationship. On Day 28, she walked out of the house with Piero.

=== Nacho ===
Nacho entered the house on Day 1. He was a housemate from Gran Hermano 4 where he formed a relationship with Desirée and fathered a son with her; their relationship ended sometime after their season ended. He voluntarily left the house on Day 3, along with Desirée, due to their child's illness.

=== Nicky ===
Nicky entered the house on Day 1. He was a housemate from Gran Hermano 6 who first held the Gran Hermano record for the highest eviction percentage, which was broken in Gran Hermano 9 by Ángela. He was paired with fellow Gran Hermano 6 housemate Bea until Day 17, when she was ejected. On Day 21, his new partner, Cristal, joined the game and later on were evicted.

=== Nicola ===
Nico entered the house on Day 1. He was a housemate from Gran Hermano 5. He and Ainhoa were evicted in the Finale on Day 56 and came out in Third Place.

=== Noemí ===
Noemí entered the house on Day 1. She was a housemate from Gran Hermano 3. After leaving the reality show, Noemí married Raquel M., her friend in that series. After several years of their relationship, they divorced. Noemí, along with Raquel M., was evicted in a surprise eviction on Day 7.

=== Orlando ===
Orlando entered the house on Day 35. He was a housemate from Gran Hermano 10. Orlando and his partner Gema were evicted on Day 49.

=== Pepe ===
Pepe entered the house on Day 7. He is the winner of Gran Hermano 7 with the highest winning percentage of any season in Gran Hermano with 87.2%. He and Raquel L. won this show with 55.2% of the votes.

=== Piero ===
Piero entered the house on Day 1. He was a housemate from Gran Hermano 9 where he formed a relationship with Melania. After months of their relationship, they broke up. He and Melania left the House on Day 28.

=== Raquel L. ===
Raquel López entered the house on Day 7. She was a housemate from Gran Hermano 7. She and Pepe won this season with 55.2% of the votes.

=== Raquel M. ===
Raquel Morillas entered the house on Day 1. She was a housemate from Gran Hermano 3. After leaving the reality show, Raquel M. married Noemí, her friend in that season. After several years of their relationship, they divorced. Raquel M., along with Noemí, was evicted in a surprise eviction on Day 7.

=== Silvia ===
Silvia entered the house on Day 42. She was a housemate from Gran Hermano 1 replacing Maria José. She and Jorge were evicted in the Finale on Day 56 and came out as the Runners-up.

== Nominations table ==
	Week 1	Week 2	Week 3	Week 4	Week 5	Week 6	Week 7	Week 8 Final		Eviction Votes received
Pepe	Exempt	Beatriz & Inma	Almudena & Ana	Amor & Andallá	No; Nominations	Dani & Marusky	Ainhoa & Nico	Winners (Day 56)		0
Raquel L.	Exempt	Beatriz & Inma	Almudena & Ana	Amor & Andallá	No; Nominations	Dani & Marusky	Ainhoa & Nico	Winners (Day 56)		0
Jorge	Not in House			Exempt	No; Nominations	Nominated	Gema & Orlando	Runners-Up (Day 56)		1
Silvia	Not in House					Exempt	Almudena & Ana	Runners-Up (Day 56)		1
Ainhoa & Nico	Nominated	Nominated	Almudena & Ana	Amor & Andallá	No; Nominations	Dani & Marusky	Nominated	Third Place (Day 56)		2
Almudena & Ana	Not in House	Exempt	Nominated	Nominated	No; Nominations	Jorge	Nominated	Evicted (Day 49)		1
Gema & Orlando	Not in House				No; Nominations	Dani & Marusky	Nominated	Evicted (Day 49)		1
Dani & Marusky	Not in House				No; Nominations	Nominated	Evicted (Day 42)			3
Maria José	Not in House			Exempt	No; Nominations	Walked (Day 37)				0
Amor & Andallá	Not in House	Exempt	Nominated	Nominated	Evicted (Day 28)					2
Melania & Piero	Noemí & Raquel M.	Beatriz & Inma	Amor & Andallá	Walked (Day 28)						0
Cristal	Not in House		Nominated	Evicted (Day 21)						0
Nicky	Noemí & Raquel M.	Beatriz & Inma	Nominated	Evicted (Day 21)						0
Bea	Noemí & Raquel M.	Beatriz & Inma	Ejected (Day 17)							0
Beatriz & Inma	Exempt	Nominated	Evicted (Day 14)							3
Indhira	Noemí & Raquel M.	Walked (Day 9)								0
Arturo	Noemí & Raquel M.	Ejected (Day 8)								0
Noemí & Raquel M.	Nominated	Evicted (Day 7)								3
Desirée & Nacho	Walked (Day 3)									0
Notes	^{1}	^{2}, ^{3}	^{2}, ^{4}, ^{5}	^{2}	^{6}	^{2}	^{2} & ^{7}	^{8}		
Walked	Desirée & Nacho	Indhira	None	Melania & Piero	None	Maria José	None			
Ejected	None	Arturo	Bea	None						
Evicted	Noemí & Raquel M. 3 of 3 votes to evict	Beatriz & Inma; 3 of 3 votes to evict	Cristal & Nicky; 0 of 3 votes to save	Amor & Andalla; 2 of 2 votes to evict	No; Eviction	Dani & Marusky; 3 of 4 votes to evict	Gema & Orlando; 1 of 4 votes to save	Ainhoa & Nico; 6.8% to win	Jorge & Silvia; 38% to win	
Evicted	Noemí & Raquel M. 3 of 3 votes to evict	Beatriz & Inma; 3 of 3 votes to evict	Cristal & Nicky; 0 of 3 votes to save	Amor & Andalla; 2 of 2 votes to evict	No; Eviction	Dani & Marusky; 3 of 4 votes to evict	Almudena & Ana; 1 of 4 votes to save	Pepe & Raquel L. 55.2% to win		

=== Notes ===
- ^1 For the first round of nominations, the public was voting for the top three pairs to be immune from being nominated for eviction. The two pairs with the fewest save votes from the public will face possible eviction, as the immune housemates/pairs will decide to either evict or save them. Ainhoa & Nico of Gran Hermano 5 and Noemi & Raquel M. from Gran Hermano 3 received the fewest public votes, hence were nominated for eviction.
- ^2 For this week's nominations, the public is voting for the pair they want to be immune from nomination.
- ^3 As the housemates are working in pairs, Arturo & Indhira represented Gran Hermano 11. On Day 8, Arturo was ejected from the house and Indhira stayed as GH would have brought in a new partner for her. However, on Day 9, Indhira voluntarily left the house. Arturo & Indhira's exit did not affect the public vote for immunity for Week 2.
- ^4 As the housemates are working in pairs, Bea & Nicky represented Gran Hermano 6. On Day 17, Bea was ejected from the house and Nicky remained as the sole player for GH6 until Day 21, as GH would have brought in a new partner for him (Cristal). Bea's exit did not affect the public vote for immunity for Week 3.
- ^5 For this week's eviction, the three saved teams voted to save a couple.
- ^6 There were no nominations or evictions for Week 5. Instead, the Gala featured the entrances of two new pairs: GH8's Marusky & Dani and GH10's Gemma and Orlando.
- ^7 For this week's eviction, the three pairs with the fewest votes were nominated for eviction and the two saved pairs were broken up when Gran Hermano asked the four housemates who they wanted to save.
- ^8 As of the conclusion of the Gala of Week 7 and all of Week 8, the public is voting for the pair they want to win.

== Audiences ==
Date	Characteristics	Total viewers	Share
3 February 2010	Premiere	3.665.000	24,5%
9 February 2010	Beatriz-Inma & Pepe-Raquel L enter/ Noemí- Raquel M. evicted	3.335.000	20,6%
16 February 2010	Beatriz-Inma evicted/ Almudena-Ana & Amor-Andallá enter	3.014.000	20,8%
23 February 2010	Cristal enters/ Cristal-Nicky evicted	3.171.000	22,2%
2 March 2010	Melania-Piero walk/Jorge-María José enter & Amor-Andallá evicted	2.876.000	19,0%
9 March 2010	Daniel-Marusky & Gema-Orlando enter	2.695.000	18,8%
16 March 2010	Daniel-Marusky Evicted/Silvia enters	2.641.000	19,4%
23 March 2010	Double eviction: Almudena-Ana & Gema-Orlando	2.460.000	16,9%
30 March 2010	Finale	2.948.000	23,1%

== See also ==
- Main Article of Gran Hermano
