= El Tiempo del Descuento =

- Presented by: Jorge Javier Vazquez
- No. of days: 36
- No. of housemates: 12
- Winner: Gianmarco Onestini
- No. of episodes: 14 (include Más Tiempo del Descuento)

Release
- Original network: Telecinco
- Original release: 12 January – 16 February 2020

El Tiempo del Descuento is a Spanish reality show produced by Zeppelin TV and broadcast on Telecinco on 12 January 2020. In this show, several Gran Hermano VIP 7 housemates return to the house in Guadalix de la Sierra, overcome the past and fight together to solve their unfinished business. The final prize of the show is 30,000 Euros. In addition, the show has a similar format to the previous Gran Hermano shows, featuring weekly tasks, head of the house, nominations and evictions.

Due to sponsor withdrawal during the airing of Gran Hermano VIP 7 after the "Carlota incident" exploded which happened in Gran Hermano 18, the second season of Gran Hermano Dúo was cancelled. It resulted that Telecinco does not have a live reality show to broadcast in early 2020. And because of the success of the Gran Hermano VIP 7, Mediaset Spain and Zeppelin TV launched El Tiempo del Descuento in January 2020, where several former housemates of that season would be gathered in order to resolve their conflicts. The show offers 24 hours online live stream through the online payment platform Mitele Plus.

The main show presented by Jorge Javier Vázquez, and Más Tiempo del Descuento presented by Núria Marín.

== Housemates ==
Housemates	Age	Residence	Famous for...	Unfinished business with...	Entered	Exited	Status
Gianmarco Onestini	23	Bologna	Model and Grande Fratello 16 housemate	Adara, Antonio David & Dinio	Day 1	Day 36	Winner
Kiko Jiménez	27	Madrid	MYHYV participant	Estela & Antonio David	Day 1	Day 36	Runner-up
Anabel Pantoja	33	Seville	TV panelist	Viewers	Day 1	Day 36	Third Place
Pol Badía	25	Barcelona	Gran Hermano 17 housemate	Joao	Day 1	Day 36	Fourth Place
Maestro Joao	55	Madrid	Fortune teller	Pol	Day 1	Day 29	7th Evicted
Dinio García	47	Barcelona	TV personality	Gianmarco, Adara & Antonio David	Day 1	Day 29	6th Evicted
Diego Arroba 'El Cejas'	18	Mallorca	Internet personality	Nuria	Day 1	Day 22	5th Evicted
Estela Grande	24	Madrid	Model and influencer	Kiko	Day 1	Day 22	4th Evicted
Nuria Martínez	29	Barcelona	Dancer	Diego	Day 1	Day 15	3rd Evicted
Hugo Castejón	47	Madrid	Singer	Adara, Kiko & Diego	Day 1	Day 15	2nd Evicted
Antonio David Flores	43	Málaga	Rocío Jurado's ex son-in-law	Gianmarco, Kiko & Adara	Day 1	Day 8	1st Evicted
Adara Molinero	26	Mallorca	Gran Hermano 17 housemate	Gianmarco, Hugo, Dinio & Antonio David	Day 1	Day 8	Walked

== Nominations table ==
	Week 1	Week 2	Week 3		Week 4		Week 5	Week 6 Final	
	Week 1	Week 2	Day 15	Day 16	Day 22	Day 23	Week 5	Week 6 Final	
Head(s) of Household	Dinio; Kiko		none		Gianmarco		none		
Gianmarco	A. David; Nuria; Estela	Hugo; Nuria; Estela	Dinio; Estela; Nuria	Estela; Dinio; Pol	Dinio; Pol; Diego	Dinio; Pol; Anabel	Nominated	Winner (Day 36)	
Kiko	A. David; Hugo; Pol	Hugo; Pol; Nuria	Pol; Dinio; Nuria	Pol; Dinio; Anabel	Dinio; Pol; Joao	Pol; Dinio; Joao	Nominated	Runner-Up (Day 36)	
Anabel	Hugo; Nuria; Pol	Hugo; Pol; Nuria	Dinio; Pol; Nuria	Pol; Dinio; Diego	Dinio; Pol; Kiko	Pol; Dinio; Kiko	Nominated	Third Place (Day 36)	
Pol	A. David; Estela; Diego	Anabel; Diego; Estela	Diego; Kiko; Estela	Estela; Anabel; Diego	Kiko; Diego; Anabel	Kiko; Anabel; Joao	Nominated	Fourth Place (Day 36)	
Joao	Hugo; A. David; Nuria	Hugo; Nuria; Estela	Dinio; Nuria; Diego	Dinio; Diego; Estela	Dinio; Kiko; Diego	Dinio; Kiko; Pol	Nominated	Evicted (Day 29)	
Dinio	Gianmarco; Estela; Anabel	Nuria; Diego; Estela	Diego; Estela; Joao	Estela; Anabel; Diego	Kiko; Diego; Anabel	Kiko; Anabel; Joao	Evicted (Day 29)		
Diego	Hugo; Pol; Anabel	Hugo; Pol; Anabel	Pol; Dinio; Joao	Dinio; Pol; Anabel	Dinio; Pol; Anabel	Evicted (Day 22)			
Estela	A. David; Pol; Gianmarco	Pol; Hugo; Gianmarco	Dinio; Pol; Gianmarco	Dinio; Pol; Gianmarco	Evicted (Day 22)		Guest (Day 29-30)	Evicted (Day 22)	
Nuria	Gianmarco; Anabel; Joao	Hugo; Anabel; Gianmarco	Kiko; Joao; Anabel	Evicted (Day 15)					
Hugo	A. David; Gianmarco; Diego	Anabel; Nuria; Diego	Evicted (Day 15)						
A. David	Gianmarco; Estela; Nuria	Evicted (Day 8)							
Adara	Walked (Day 8)						Guest (Day 29-30)	Walked (Day 8)	
Notes	1	none	2		3	none	4	5	
Nominated (pre-HoH)	A. David; Estela; Gianmarco; Hugo	none	none		Diego; Dinio; Kiko; Pol	none			
Saved (by HoH)	none	none	none		Kiko	none			
Nominated for eviction	A. David; Estela; Gianmarco; Hugo	Anabel; Hugo; Nuria; Pol	Diego; Dinio; Estela; Kiko; Nuria; Pol	Anabel; Dinio; Estela; Pol	Anabel; Diego; Dinio; Pol	Anabel; Dinio; Kiko; Pol	Anabel; Gianmarco; Joao; Kiko; Pol	Anabel; Gianmarco; Kiko; Pol	
Walked	Adara	none							
Evicted	A. David; 60% to evict	Hugo; 64% to evict (out of 2)	Nuria; 58.4% to evict	Estela; Most votes to evict (out of 2)	Diego; Most votes to evict	Dinio; 75% to evict (out of 2)	Joao; Most votes to evict	Pol; Fewest votes to win (out of 4)	Anabel; Fewest votes to win (out of 3)
Evicted	A. David; 60% to evict	Hugo; 64% to evict (out of 2)	Nuria; 58.4% to evict	Estela; Most votes to evict (out of 2)	Diego; Most votes to evict	Dinio; 75% to evict (out of 2)	Joao; Most votes to evict	Kiko; 21% to win (out of 2)	Gianmarco; 79% to win (out of 2)

=== Notes ===
- ^Note 1: The HoHs won the power to veto a housemate's nominations. They didn't use this power.
- ^Note 2: The HoH's power this week was to automatically nominate a housemate. However, none of the housemates won the privilege of being HoH.
- ^Note 3: The HoH had the power to save a nominated housemate.
- ^Note 4: All the housemates were automatically nominated for eviction.
- ^Note 5: Lines were opened to vote for the winner.

== Nominations total received ==
	Week 1	Week 2	Week 3		Week 4		Week 5	Final	Total
	Week 1	Week 2	Day 15	Day 16	Day 22	Day 23	Week 5	Final	Total
Gianmarco	12	2	1	1	-	-	-	Winner	16
Kiko	-	-	5	0	9	9	-	Runner-Up	23
Anabel	4	9	1	6	3	5	-	Third Place	28
Pol	6	9	10	11	8	9	-	Fourth Place	53
Joao	1	0	4	0	1	3	-	Evicted	9
Dinio	-	-	16	15	15	10	Evicted		56
Diego	2	5	7	5	6	Evicted			25
Estela	7	4	5	10	Evicted				26
Nuria	6	11	5	Evicted					22
Hugo	11	20	Evicted						31
A. David	17	Evicted							17
Adara	Walked								0

== Blind results ==
Week	1stPlace to Evict	2ndPlace to Evict	3rdPlace to Evict	4thPlace to Evict
2	56.1%	42.2%	1.4%	0.3%
2	62.9%	36.3%	0.8%	
2	63.6%	36.4%		
3	90.8%	8.9%	0.2%	0.1%
3	76.3%	23.4%	0.3%	
3	76.2%	23.8%		
3	75.8%	24.2%		
4	45.8%	44.0%	9.7%	0.5%
4	52.9%	47.1%		
6	70.7%	24.0%	4.3%	1.0%
6	76.7%	18.7%	3.8%	0.8%

== Ratings ==
=== "Galas" ===
Show N°	Day	Viewers	Ratings share
1 - Launch	Sunday, January 12	2.182.000	18.1%
2	Sunday, January 19	2.056.000	16.5%
3	Sunday, January 26	2.122.000	17.1%
4	Sunday, February 2	2.198.000	18.4%
5	Sunday, February 9	2.272.000	18.5%
6 - Final	Sunday, February 16	2.335.000	19.5%

=== "Más Tiempo del Descuento" ===
Show N°	Day	Viewers	Ratings share
1	Monday, January 20	1.972.000	10.9%
2	Wednesday, January 22	2.192.000	12.0%
3	Monday, January 27	2.078.000	11.8%
4	Wednesday, January 29	1.976.000	11.2%
5	Monday, February 3	2.021.000	11.7%
6	Wednesday, February 5	1.871.000	10.9%
7	Monday, February 10	2.072.000	11.9%
8	Wednesday, February 12	2.031.000	11.5%
