= Dinio =

Cuban singer

Dinio García Leyva
- Born: Dinio García Leyva; February 14, 1978 (age 48); Havana, Cuba (Barcelona)

Dinio García Leyva (born February 14, 1978) is a Cuban singer.

== Biography ==
Dinio wrote his own autobiography (see below under Books) and recorded a single which in the week of June 9, 2003 became the number 1 in sales in Spain. It also rose as high as number 62 in Billboard's official Eurochart Hot 100 Singles for the week of June 21, 2003.

== Reality Shows ==
| Year | Name | Entered | Exited | Status |
|---|---|---|---|---|
| 2019 | Gran Hermano VIP (season 7) | Day 1 | Day 23 | 3rd Evicted |
| 2020 | El Tiempo del Descuento | Day 1 | Day 29 | 6th Evicted |

== Partial filmography ==
- Plauto, recuerdo distorsionado de un tonto eventual (2004) aka Plauto (Spain: short title) (USA) as Brothel Client
