= BB17 =

BB17 may refer to:

- USS Rhode Island (BB-17)
- Big Brother 17 (disambiguation), a television programme in various versions
