= Gran Hermano VIP season 8 =

Gran Hermano VIP
- Season 8
- Presented by: Marta Flich; Ion Aramendi
- No. of days: 99
- No. of housemates: 19 + 1 (infiltrated)
- Winner: Naomi Asensi
- Runner-up: Luitingo

Release
- Original network: Telecinco
- Original release: September 14 – December 21, 2023

Season chronology
- ← Previous; Season 7

Gran Hermano VIP 8 is the eighth season of the reality television Gran Hermano VIP series which premiered on September 14, 2023, on Telecinco.

After months of speculation as to whether the series would return with a new season, Telecinco originally announced the new season of GH VIP in June 2021 to air later that year.

In July 2021, Mediaset España announced that this series would then air sometime in 2022. However, GH VIP 8 ended up being replaced by the Spanish adaptation of Secret Story during the 2021–2022 season.

On June 15, 2023, Telecinco formally confirmed the return of Gran Hermano VIP for September 2023, with new host presenter, economist and comedian Marta Flich coming in to host the main show, replacing Jorge Javier Vázquez, and Ion Aramendi taking over hosting duties for the weekly debate show.

This season comes after the longest hiatus the Spanish adaptation has ever endured in its history. The hiatus surged after Telecinco & production company Zeppelin faced backlash after the sexual assault incident that took place during the last civilian series, which aired in 2017 and that went into trial while Gran Hermano VIP 7 was reaching its final weeks on the air. Said boycott provoked a massive loss in advertisers for the show at that time. On that press release, both network and show's production company, made an agreement that a stricter protocol will be used when it comes to sexual assault situation that might happen while a season is taking place.

== Housemates ==
17 housemates entered in the first night. That same night, figure skater Javier Fernández was announced to enter in a later day. In the first Debate, at Day 4, Pedro García Aguado was announced as "a mole" instead of him being a real contestant. Javier Fernández joined the rest of the houseguest on Day 8, during the second "Gala".

Housemates	Age	Famous for...	Entered	Exited	Status
Naomi Asensi	28	LIDLT 6 star	Day 32	Day 99	Winner
Luitingo	33	Singer-songwriter	Day 57	Day 99	Runner-up
Luitingo	33	Singer-songwriter	Day 1	Day 43	6th evicted
Albert Infante	25	Artist & performer	Day 57	Day 99	Third place
Albert Infante	25	Artist & performer	Day 1	Day 36	5th evicted
(Peru) Laura Bozzo (Note: Laura Bozzo previously participated on the second season of La casa de los famosos.)	72	Talk show hostess	Day 1	Day 98	15th evicted
(Italy) Michael Terlizzi	37	Grande Fratello 16 housemate	Day 1	Day 95	14th evicted
Carmen Alcayde	50	TV host and panelist	Day 1	Day 92	13th evicted
Pilar Llori	26	Reality TV star	Day 57	Day 85	12th evicted
Pilar Llori	26	Reality TV star	Day 1	Day 29	3rd evicted
Jessica Bueno	33	Model, Miss Seville 2009	Day 1	Day 78	11th evicted
Zeus Montiel	40	Singer, Sara Montiel's son	Day 1	Day 71	10th evicted
Susana Bianca	31	Plus-size model	Day 36	Day 64	9th evicted
Susana Bianca	31	Plus-size model	Day 1	Day 36	4th evicted
José Antonio Avilés	27	Journalist and TV panelist	Day 32	Day 57	8th evicted
Marta Castro	39	Influencer & entrepreneur	Day 1	Day 50	7th evicted
Gustavo Guillermo	53	María Teresa Campos' chauffeur	Day 1	Day 49	Ejected
(Argentina) Álex Caniggia	30	TV personality	Day 1	Day 49	Ejected
Javier Fernández	32	Olympic figure skating medallist	Day 8	Day 49	Quit
Karina	76	Singer	Day 1	Day 25	Quit
(Argentina) Sol Macaluso	28	Russo-Ukrainian War correspondent	Day 1	Day 22	2nd evicted
(Venezuela) Oriana Marzoli	31	Reality TV star	Day 1	Day 16	Quit
(Italy) Luca Dazi	19	TikTok star	Day 1	Day 15	1st evicted
Guest(s)
Yiya del Guillén	35	Reality TV star	Day 32	Day 39	Rejected housemate
Pedro García Aguado	54	Olympic water polo medalist and TV host	Day 1	Day 8	Fake contestant

== Nominations table ==
	Week 1	Week 2	Week 3	Week 4	Week 5	Week 6	Week 7	Week 8	Week 9	Week 10	Week 11		Week 12	Week 13		Week 14	
	Week 1	Week 2	Week 3	Week 4	Week 5	Week 6	Week 7	Week 8	Week 9	Week 10	Day 78	Day 81	Week 12	Day 92	Day 95	Day 98	Day 99
Head(s) of Household	Laura	Albert; Zeus	none	Álex	Michael	none					~~Laura~~	none					
Naomi	Not in House				Nominated	Avilés; Marta	Avilés; Michael; Zeus	Michael; Susana; Zeus	Jessica(2); Michael(2); Zeus(2)	Jessica; Michael; Pilar	~~Carmen~~; ~~Albert~~	Michael; Luitingo; Laura	No; Nominations	No; Nominations	No; Nominations	No; Nominations	Winner (Day 99)
Luitingo	Luca; Karina; Susana	Laura; Karina; Javier	Laura; Javier; Álex	Laura	Carmen; Álex; Laura	Evicted (Day 43)		Nominated	Exempt	Pilar; Albert; Carmen	~~Michael~~; ~~Carmen~~	Pilar; Laura; Naomi	No; Nominations	No; Nominations	No; Nominations	No; Nominations	Runner-up (Day 99)
Albert	Álex; Zeus; Gustavo	Álex; Gustavo; Karina	Gustavo; Zeus; Karina	Susana; Zeus; Gustavo	Evicted (Day 36)			Nominated	Exempt	Jessica; Michael; Luitingo	~~Carmen~~; ~~Naomi~~	Luitingo; Michael; Pilar	No; Nominations	No; Nominations	No; Nominations	No; Nominations	Third Place (Day 99)
Laura	Zeus; Michael; Karina	Luitingo; Jessica; Álex	Gustavo; Jessica; Susana	Zeus; Susana	Gustavo; Luitingo; Zeus	Avilés; Marta	Michael; Avilés; Zeus	Susana; Michael; Zeus	Jessica(3); Michael(3); Zeus(3)	Jessica; Luitingo; Pilar	~~Albert~~; ~~Carmen~~	Luitingo; Pilar; Michael	No; Nominations	No; Nominations	No; Nominations	Evicted (Day 98)	
Michael	Pilar; Marta; Luca	Sol; Jessica; Marta	Susana; Marta; Pilar	Zeus; Jessica	Carmen; Laura; Jessica	Carmen; Naomi	Naomi; Carmen; Laura	Naomi; Carmen; Laura	Naomi(2); Carmen(1); Laura(1)	Carmen; Naomi; Laura	~~Luitingo~~; ~~Albert~~	Pilar; Naomi; Laura	No; Nominations	No; Nominations	Evicted (Day 95)		
Carmen	Álex; Zeus; Gustavo	Karina; Javier; Álex	Gustavo; Jessica; Karina	Susana; Zeus; Gustavo	Luitingo; Marta; Javier	Avilés; Marta	Michael; Avilés; Jessica	Susana; Michael; Zeus	Jessica(3); Michael(3); Zeus(3)	Jessica; Michael; Laura	~~Albert~~; ~~Naomi~~	Michael; Luitingo; Laura	No; Nominations	Evicted (Day 92)	Guest (Day 95–98)	Evicted (Day 92)	
Pilar	Álex; Michael; Karina	Álex; Karina; Laura	Álex; Javier; Laura	Evicted (Day 29)				Nominated	Exempt	Michael; Jessica; Carmen	~~Naomi~~; ~~Albert~~	Luitingo; Laura; Michael	Re-Evicted (Day 85)		Guest (Day 95–98)	Re-Evicted (Day 85)	
Jessica	Gustavo; Michael; Luca	Laura; Oriana; Álex	Laura; Albert; Carmen	Michael	Carmen; Álex; Javier	Carmen; Naomi	Laura; Carmen; Naomi	Laura; Carmen; Naomi	Carmen(2); Laura(2); Naomi(1)	Laura; Albert; Pilar	Evicted (Day 78)				Guest (Day 95–98)	Evicted (Day 78)	
Zeus	Luca; Albert; Carmen	Laura; Carmen; Oriana	Laura; Albert; Carmen	Not eligible	Carmen; Laura; Álex	Carmen; Naomi	Carmen; Michael; Naomi	Laura; Carmen; Naomi	Carmen(1); Laura(1); Naomi(1)	Evicted (Day 71)							
Susana	Álex; Karina; Pilar	Michael; Laura; Álex	Michael; Laura; Javier	Not eligible	Evicted (Day 36)	Carmen; Naomi	Michael; Carmen; Avilés	Michael; Carmen; Laura	Re-Evicted (Day 64)								
Avilés	Not in House				Nominated	Carmen; Naomi	Laura; Carmen; Naomi	Evicted (Day 57)									
Marta	Karina; Álex; Michael	Álex; Karina; Michael	Laura; Álex; Javier	Javier; Albert	Carmen; Álex Gustavo	Carmen; Naomi	Evicted (Day 50)										
Gustavo	Jessica; Luca; Karina	Laura; Carmen; Pilar	Albert; Laura; Carmen	Carmen	Carmen; Laura; Zeus	Carmen; Naomi	Ejected (Day 49)										
Álex	Pilar; Sol; Luca	Sol; Marta; Susana	Pilar; Marta; Susana	Jessica; Susana; Marta	Marta; Luitingo; Zeus	Avilés; Marta	Ejected (Day 49)								Guest (Day 95–98)	Ejected (Day 49)	
Javier	Exempt	Laura; Oriana; Carmen	Pilar; Luitingo; Susana	Albert	Carmen; Álex; Jessica	Carmen; Naomi	Walked (Day 49)										
Karina	Luca; Álex; Susana	Laura; Álex; Luitingo	Albert; Carmen; Laura	Walked (Day 25)													
Sol	Karina; Álex; Luca	Álex; Michael; Karina	Evicted (Day 22)														
Oriana	Álex; Karina; Zeus	Álex; Jessica; Javier	Walked (Day 16)														
Luca	Álex; Zeus; Gustavo	Evicted (Day 15)															
Notes	1	2	3	4, 5, 6	7	8, 9	none		10, 11	12	13, 14		none		15		none
Nominated for eviction	Álex; Karina; Luca; Zeus	Álex; Jessica; Karina; Laura; Michael; Sol	Albert; Gustavo; Laura; Pilar	Albert; Gustavo; Javier; Jessica; Susana; Zeus	Álex; Carmen; Laura; Luitingo	Carmen; Javier; Marta; Naomi	Avilés; Carmen; Laura; Michael	Carmen; Laura; Michael; Susana	Carmen; Laura; Michael; Naomi; Zeus	Carmen; Jessica; Laura; Michael; Pilar	~~Luitingo~~; ~~Michael~~; ~~Pilar~~	Laura; Luitingo; Michael; Pilar	Albert; Carmen; Laura; Luitingo; Michael; Naomi	Albert; Laura; Luitingo; Michael; Naomi	Albert; Laura; Luitingo; Naomi	Albert; Luitingo; Naomi	
Walked	none	Oriana	Karina	none		Javier	none										
Ejected	none					Álex; Gustavo	none										
Evicted	Luca; 69% to evict (out of 2)	Sol; 75% to evict (out of 2)	Pilar; 64% to evict (out of 2)	Susana; 38% to evict (out of 3)	Luitingo; 67% to evict (out of 2)	Marta; 73% to evict (out of 2)	Avilés; 85% to evict (out of 2)	Susana; 77% to evict (out of 2)	Zeus; 54% to evict (out of 2)	Jessica; 54% to evict (out of 2)	Nomination Canceled	Pilar; 50.2% to evict (out of 2)	Carmen; 9.7% to save (out of 6)	Michael; 9.6% to save (out of 5)	Laura; 14% to save (out of 4)	Naomi; 57% to win (out of 2)	
Evicted	Luca; 69% to evict (out of 2)	Sol; 75% to evict (out of 2)	Pilar; 64% to evict (out of 2)	Albert; 50.7% to evict (out of 2)	Luitingo; 67% to evict (out of 2)	Marta; 73% to evict (out of 2)	Avilés; 85% to evict (out of 2)	Susana; 77% to evict (out of 2)	Zeus; 54% to evict (out of 2)	Jessica; 54% to evict (out of 2)	Nomination Canceled	Pilar; 50.2% to evict (out of 2)	Carmen; 9.7% to save (out of 6)	Michael; 9.6% to save (out of 5)	Laura; 14% to save (out of 4)	Albert; 27% to win (out of 3)	Luitingo; 43% to win (out of 2)

=== Notes ===
This housemate was the Head of Household.
This housemate was directly nominated for eviction prior to the regular nominations process.
This housemate was granted immunity from nominations.

Housemates nominate with 3, 2 and 1 point.

- ^Note 1 : Jessica and Sol failed to guess the correct infiltrated contestant, so they were added 3 points in the nominations.
- ^Note 2 : The HoHs won the power to save one of the nominees and replace him/her with another housemates. They didn't use it.
- ^Note 3 : Gustavo won the power to save one of the nominees and replace him/her with another housemates. He didn't use it.
- ^Note 4 : Álex bid €100 to get immunity and ended up being immune, because no one else bid for her.
- ^Note 5 : Carmen won the power to put another contestant on the list of nominees. She didn't use it.
- ^Note 6 : Avilés, Naomi and Yiya entered on Day 32 as potential housemates to replace Oriana and Karina. The public voted to choose two of them.
- ^Note 7 : Zeus decided to spend €25,000 of the final prize on the extra life, so that Susana could return home.
- ^Note 8 : The members of the orange room (Álex, Carmen, Laura and Naomi) suddenly nominated Avilés and Marta and The members of the blue room (the rest of the house) suddenly nominated Carmen and Naomi.
- ^Note 9 : Avilés bid €12,000 for his own salvation and decided to nominate Javier.
- ^Note 10 : Zeus got the power of salvation and decided to save Jessica.
- ^Note 11 : Jessica and Pilar were offered the power to pay €5,000 to let Luitingo to return to the house. Pilar rejected the offer but Jessica accepted it.
- ^Note 12 : At this gala, family members were in charge of nominating.
- ^Note 13 : Laura bid €50,000 to become the first finalist of the edition. But, both the bet and the nominations were cancelled, due to Laura's irregularities in said bet.
- ^Note 14 : This week's nominations were positive. But the second nominations were like always (1,2 and 3 points in negative).
- ^Note 15 : On day 95 of the contest, Álex, Jessica, Carmen and Pilar entered the house, as campaign managers. They were there until day 98 of the contest.

== Nominations total received ==
	Week 1	Week 2	Week 3	Week 4	Week 5	Week 6	Week 7	Week 8	Week 9	Week 10	Week 11		Week 12	Week 13	Final	Total
Naomi	Not in house				-	-	6	5	4	2	~~4~~	3	-	-	Winner	20
Luitingo	0	4	2	0	7	Evicted		-	-	3	~~2~~	13	-	-	Runner-up	29
Albert	2	-	10	2	Evicted			-	-	4	~~7~~	0	-	-	Third Place	18
Laura	-	21	18	1	7	-	7	8	4	5	~~-~~	7	-	-	Evicted	78
Michael	7	6	3	1	-	-	13	10	8	9	~~2~~	10	-	Evicted		67
Carmen	1	5	5	1	21	-	11	8	4	5	~~6~~	0	-	Evicted		61
Pilar	7	1	7	Evicted				-	-	6	~~0~~	9	Re-Evicted			30
Jessica	6	6	4	4	2	-	1	0	8	14	Evicted					45
Zeus	10	-	2	8	3	-	2	3	8	Evicted						36
Susana	2	1	6	9	-	-	0	8	Re-Evicted							26
Avilés	Not in house				-	-	8	Evicted								8
Marta	2	3	4	1	5	-	Evicted									15
Gustavo	6	2	9	2	4	-	Ejected									23
Álex	24	21	6	-	9	-	Ejected									60
Javier	-	4	6	2	2	-	Walked									14
Karina	15	11	2	Walked												28
Sol	5	6	Evicted													11
Oriana	0	5	Walked													5
Luca	15	Evicted														15

== Debate: Blind results ==
Week	1stPlace to Evict	2ndPlace to Evict	3rdPlace to Evict	4thPlace to Evict	5thPlace to Evict	6thPlace to Evict
1	42.0%	36.0%	18.0%	4.0%		
1	42.0%	36.0%	17.0%	5.0%		
1	43.0%	35.0%	17.0%	5.0%		
1	46.0%	32.0%	17.0%	5.0%		
1	47.0%	32.0%	17.0%	4.0%		
1	52.0%	31.0%	17.0%			
1	69.0%	31.0%				
2	46.0%	20.0%	13.0%	8.0%	8.0%	5.0%
2	45.0%	20.0%	14.0%	9.0%	8.0%	4.0%
2	61.0%	21.0%	18.0%			
2	61.0%	20.0%	19.0%			
2	75.0%	25.0%				
3	49.0%	28.0%	13.0%	10.0%		
3	49.0%	28.0%	14.0%	9.0%		
3	54.0%	31.0%	15.0%			
3	64.0%	36.0%				
4	35.0%	26.0%	25.0%	6.0%	5.0%	3.0%
4	34.0%	26.0%	25.0%	7.0%	5.0%	3.0%
4	41.0%	28.0%	24.0%	7.0%		
4	42.0%	30.0%	28.0%			
4	40.0%	31.0%	29.0%			
4	38.0%	32.0%	30.0%			
4	50.7%	49.3%				
5	55.0%	32.0%	8.0%	5.0%		
5	54.0%	32.0%	9.0%	5.0%		
5	58.0%	33.0%	9.0%			
5	60.0%	31.0%	9.0%			
5	61.0%	30.0%	9.0%			
5	60.0%	31.0%	9.0%			
5	67.0%	33.0%				
6	66.0%	19.0%	8.0%	7.0%		
6	64.0%	19.0%	9.0%	8.0%		
6	68.0%	21.0%	11.0%			
6	66.0%	22.0%	12.0%			
6	73.0%	27.0%				
7	79.0%	8.0%	7.0%	6.0%		
7	81.0%	11.0%	8.0%			
7	87.0%	13.0%				
7	85.0%	15.0%				
8	60.0%	19.0%	14.0%	7.0%		
8	58.0%	20.0%	14.0%	8.0%		
8	62.0%	20.0%	18.0%			
8	77.0%	23.0%				
9	35.0%	29.0%	24.0%	7.0%	5.0%	
9	34.0%	29.0%	25.0%	7.0%	5.0%	
9	40.0%	33.0%	27.0%			
9	37.0%	37.0%	26.0%			
9	38.0%	35.0%	27.0%			
9	52.0%	48.0%				
9	53.0%	47.0%				
9	54.0%	46.0%				
10	51.0%	35.0%	7.0%	5.0%	2.0%	
10	50.0%	34.0%	8.0%	6.0%	2.0%	
10	53.0%	39.0%	8.0%			
10	55.0%	45.0%				
10	54.0%	46.0%				
11	35.0%	34.0%	29.0%	2.0%		
11	37.0%	35.0%	26.0%	2.0%		
11	36.0%	35.0%	27.0%	2.0%		
11	38.0%	34.0%	26.0%	2.0%		
11	39.0%	34.0%	27.0%			
11	53.0%	47.0%				
11	50.8%	49.2%				
11	50.5%	49.5%				
11	50.3%	49.7%				
11	50.2%	49.8%				
Final	31.0%	21.0%	16.0%	13.0%	10.0%	9.0%
Final	31.0%	21.0%	17.0%	12.0%	10.0%	9.0%
Final	31.0%	21.0%	17.0%	12.0%	10.0%	9.0%
Final	31.0%	20.0%	17.0%	12.0%	10.0%	10.0%
Final	31.0%	20.4%	17.2%	12.1%	9.7%	9.6%
Final	30.9%	20.4%	17.3%	11.9%	9.8%	9.7%
Final	31.2%	20.8%	17.1%	11.8%	9.6%	9.5%
Final	30.6%	20.5%	17.5%	11.9%	9.8%	9.7%
Final	33.6%	23.5%	20.1%	13.2%	9.6%	
Final	37.0%	26.0%	22.0%	15.0%		
Final	36.0%	27.0%	23.0%	14.0%		
Final	41.0%	32.0%	27.0%			
Final	57.0%	43.0%				

== Repechage ==
Luca, Sol, Pilar, Albert, Luitingo, Marta and Avilés would face a voting that will decide which 3 of them will return to the house as candidates to officially become as official housemates. Only two of them finally became housemates. After Avilés was evicted, he was given the chance to join the repechage but he refused to take part in.

The repechage was officially announced on Day 53 (Noviembre 5, 2023). The 3 most voted housemates entered the house on Day 57, however the housemates had the power to bid for an evicted housemate but they rejected to do so, for this reason the third most voted evicted housemate entered as candidate.

Ex-housemate	%	Day of elimination
Albert	53%	Debate November 12
Pilar	51%	Gala November 16
Luitingo	49%	Gala November 16
Marta	N/A	Gala November 9
Sol	N/A	Gala November 9
Luca	N/A	Gala November 9

== Ratings ==
=== "Galas" ===
Show N°	Day	Viewers	Ratings share
1 – Launch	Thursday, September 14	1.106.000	13.4%
2	Thursday, September 21	881.000	12.3%
3	Thursday, September 28	825.000	11.6%
4	Thursday, October 5	849.000	12.2%
5	Thursday, October 12	850.000	11.8%
6	Thursday, October 19	1.058.000	13.8%
7	Thursday, October 26	946.000	12.8%
8	Thursday, November 2	948.000	12.9%
9	Thursday, November 9	938.000	12.9%
10	Thursday, November 16	931.000	11.8%
11	Thursday, November 23	976.000	13.0%
12	Thursday, November 30	999.000	13.2%
13	Thursday, December 7	1.000.000	12.9%
14	Thursday, December 14	969.000	13.3%
15	Wednesday, December 20	952.000	12.8%
16 – Final	Thursday, December 21	1.160.000	15.2%

=== "El Debate" ===
Show N°	Day	Viewers	Ratings share
1	Sunday, September 17	1.213.000	14.2%
2	Sunday, September 24	908.000	10.8%
3	Sunday, October 1	1.090.000	13.0%
4	Sunday, October 8	981.000	11.8%
5	Sunday, October 15	837.000	10.6%
6	Sunday, October 22	1.040.000	11.8%
7	Sunday, October 29	978.000	11.8%

=== "Límite 48H" ===
Show N°	Day	Viewers	Ratings share
1	Tuesday, September 19	832.000	12.0%
2	Tuesday, September 26	812.000	11.7%

=== "Última Hora" ===
Show N°	Day	Viewers	Ratings share
1	Monday, October 2	987.000	7,4%
2	Tuesday, October 3	890.000	6,8%
3	Wednesday, October 4	894.000	6,9%
4	Tuesday, October 10	948.000	7,4%
5	Wednesday, October 11	811.000	6,8%
6	Monday, October 16	905.000	6,6%
7	Tuesday, October 17	1.110.000	8,2%
8	Wednesday, October 18	899.000	6,7%
9	Monday, October 23	908.000	6,7%
10	Tuesday, October 24	942.000	6,9%
11	Wednesday, October 25	864.000	6,4%
12	Monday, October 30	973.000	7%
13	Tuesday, October 31	931.000	7,8%
14	Wednesday, November 1	1.082.000	7,8%
