= Anabel Pantoja =

Spanish television personality

- Born: Ana Isabel Pantoja Bernal; 15 July 1986 (age 39); Seville, Spain
- Occupation(s): Television personality, model, influencer

Ana Isabel "Anabel" Pantoja Bernal (born July 15, 1986) is a Spanish TV personality. She is known for her participation in programs of the media group Mediaset España, especially those produced by La Fábrica de la tele such as Sálvame, Deluxe or El programa de Ana Rosa.

== Biography ==
Anabel Pantoja was born in Seville on July 15, 1986, into an artist family that included her aunt, the tonadillera Isabel Pantoja, and her uncle, the singer Agustín Pantoja. His father was Bernardo Pantoja Martín, who married Mercedes Bernal in 1986 and got divorced in 1992, had an unkwnon profession and died on 25 November 2022 from diabetes at the age of 69. She is also the cousin of Kiko Rivera and Isa Pantoja. She left Seville to study in Madrid and trained as a makeup artist, becoming her aunt's assistant. She started in the world of television in 2011 as a collaborator on El programa de Ana Rosa on Telecinco.

She continued in television with Telecinco in the program Mujeres y hombres y viceversa between 2013 and 2016, where she was a commentator. In 2014 she signed on as a contestant of Supervivientes, being the second expelled after fifteen days of coexistence. Between 2015 and 2017 she was also a collaborator of ¡Qué tiempo tan feliz!, while in 2016 she signed on as a contestant of Levántate All Stars, presented by Jesús Vázquez, both on Telecinco.

In 2015, she begins to participate in the Gran Hermano 16 debate and the daily television program Sálvame, where she begins with sporadic collaborations. Her contributions to the program have grown in importance over time, and she has gained a large following among the general public, particularly on social media, where she has over one million followers on Instagram. In 2019, she became a contestant in Gran Hermano VIP, being the first expelled, and in 2020 she participated in El tiempo del descuento, reaching the final. In September 2020, she became the first participant of Solos/Solas on Mitele Plus.

In 2018, she started an entrepreneurial career by opening a nail business and working as a designer of a swimwear collection and the jewelry brand Lueli. In addition, she works as a social media influencer. In her facet as an influencer, she highlights her viral video dancing, which was picked up by a famous Korean singer of the group Loona, in which she tried to imitate it. In 2021, she also started designing accessories. In addition, she participates as a protagonist in a video clip by the Portuguese artist Nininho Vaz Maia.

In the summer of 2021, she was the star of a short Telecinco documentary called Anabel, al desnudo.

== Career ==
Year	Title	Channel	Role
2011 - 2013	El programa de Ana Rosa	Telecinco	Collaborator
2013	Abre los ojos y mira	Telecinco	Collaborator
2013 - 2016	Mujeres y hombres y viceversa	Telecinco	Opinionist
2015 - 2017	¡Qué tiempo tan feliz!	Telecinco	Collaborator
2015–present	Sálvame	Telecinco	Collaborator
2016	Gran Hermano 16	Telecinco	Collaborator
2016 - 2018	Gran Hermano VIP: El debate	Telecinco	Collaborator
2018 - 2021	Deluxe	Telecinco	Occasional Collaborator
2019 - 2021	Supervivientes: Conexión Honduras	Telecinco; Cuatro	Collaborator
2019	Gran Hermano Dúo	Telecinco	Collaborator
2021	Anabel al desnudo	Telecinco	Protagonist
2021	La última cena	Telecinco	Guest

== Realities ==
Year	Title	Role	Classification	Duration
2014	Supervivientes: Perdidos en Honduras (2014)	Contestant	2rd eliminated	15 days
2016	Levántate All-Stars	Contestant with Manuel Cortés	9th classified	72 days
2019	Sálvame Okupa	Contestant	3rd place	3 days
2019	Gran Hermano VIP (season 7)	Contestant	1st eliminated	8 days
2020	El Tiempo del Descuento	Contestant	3rd place	36 days
2020	La última cena	Contestant with Alonso Caparrós	3rd place	5 episodes
2020	Sol@	Inhabitant		8 days
2022	Supervivientes: Perdidos en Honduras (2022)	Contestant	12th eliminated	91 days

== Published works ==
- Pantoja, Anabel (10 November 2020). El plan de Sálvame para curvys. Barcelona: Ediciones Martínez-Roca. p. 192. ISBN 978-8427047884.

== Awards and nominations ==
Year	Award	Category	Result	Ref.
2020	HOY Magazine Awards	Influencer of the year	Won	
