= Gran Hermano VIP season 7 =

Gran Hermano VIP
- Season 7
- Presented by: Jorge Javier Vazquez (Gala 1-13; Final); Jordi González (Gala 14-15)
- No. of days: 100
- No. of housemates: 16
- Winner: Adara Molinero
- No. of episodes: 16

Release
- Original network: Telecinco
- Original release: September 11 – December 19, 2019

Season chronology
- ← Previous; Season 6 Next → Season 8

Gran Hermano VIP 7 was the seventh season of the reality television Gran Hermano VIP series. The season was launched in September 2019 on Telecinco. Jorge Javier Vázquez was the host of the show and Jordi González has been confirmed to be back as the host of the weekly Debate.

== Housemates ==
Housemates	Age	Famous for...	Entered	Exited	Status
Adara Molinero	26	Gran Hermano 17 housemate	Day 1	Day 100	Winner
Alba Carrillo	33	Model and TV host	Day 1	Day 100	Runner-up
Mila Ximénez	67	TV panelist and writer	Day 1	Day 100	Third place
Noemí Salazar	28	Los Gipsy Kings star	Day 1	Day 93	13th evicted
Estela Grande	24	Model and influencer	Day 1	Day 86	12th evicted
Antonio David Flores	43	Rocío Jurado’s ex son-in-law	Day 1	Day 79	11th evicted
Hugo Castejón	47	Singer	Day 1	Day 16	2nd evicted
Hugo Castejón	47	Singer	Day 47	Day 72	10th evicted
Maestro Joao	55	Fortune teller	Day 1	Day 65	9th evicted
Gianmarco Onestini	22	Grande Fratello 16 housemate	Day 1	Day 58	8th evicted
Pol Badía	25	Gran Hermano 17 housemate	Day 27	Day 51	7th evicted
El Cejas	18	Influencer and comedian	Day 1	Day 44	6th evicted
Irene Junquera	33	Sports journalist and TV host	Day 1	Day 37	5th evicted
Kiko Jiménez	27	TV personality	Day 1	Day 30	4th evicted
Dinio García	47	Singer & TV personality	Day 1	Day 23	3rd evicted
Nuria Martínez	29	Model	Day 1	Day 14	Quit
Anabel Pantoja	33	TV personality & influencer	Day 1	Day 9	1st evicted

== Nominations table ==
	Week 1	Week 2	Week 3	Week 4	Week 5	Week 6	Week 7	Week 8	Week 9	Week 10	Week 11	Week 12	Week 13	Week 14 Final	
Head(s) of Household	Dinio	Adara; A. David	Cejas; Kiko	Cejas	Mila; Noemí	Estela	Noemí	Mila	Noemí	Estela	Alba	none			
Adara	Anabel; Irene; Mila	Mila; Noemí; Cejas	Mila; A. David; Irene	Kiko; Irene; Alba	Cejas; Alba; A. David	Cejas; Alba; Noemí	A. David; Mila; Alba	A. David; Alba; Noemí	A. David; Mila; Alba	A. David; Mila; Alba	A. David; Noemí; Estela	Alba; Estela; Noemí	No; Nominations	Winner (Day 100)	
Alba	A. David; Kiko; Gianmarco	Hugo; Dinio; Nuria	Adara; Dinio; A. David	Adara; Kiko; Joao	Estela; Adara; Joao	(6) Joao	Gianmarco; Pol; Joao	Joao; Adara; Gianmarco	A. David; Hugo; Adara	A. David; Adara; Mila	A. David; Adara; Mila	Adara; Mila; Estela	No; Nominations	Runner-Up (Day 100)	
Mila	Hugo; Gianmarco; Irene	Dinio; Hugo; Irene	Adara; Dinio; Gianmarco	Gianmarco; Kiko; Estela	Adara; Estela; Gianmarco	Pol; Gianmarco; Adara	Gianmarco; Pol; Adara	Adara; Joao; Gianmarco	Hugo; Adara; A. David	Adara; A. David; Noemí	Estela; Adara; A. David	Estela; Alba; Adara	No; Nominations	Third Place (Day 100)	
Noemí	Hugo; Gianmarco; Joao	Hugo; Dinio; Joao	Adara; Dinio; Joao	Adara; Joao; Kiko	Adara; Joao; Estela	(6) Pol	Gianmarco; Pol; Joao	Joao; Adara; Gianmarco	Hugo; Joao; Adara	Adara; A. David; Mila	Adara; A. David; Mila	Adara; Mila; Estela	No; Nominations	Evicted (Day 93)	
Estela	Irene; Hugo; Gianmarco	Hugo; Dinio; Cejas	Dinio; Gianmarco; Adara	Gianmarco; Adara; Mila	Cejas; Alba; A. David	Cejas; Alba; A. David	(6) Alba	Adara; Joao; A. David	Hugo; A. David; Adara	Hugo	A. David; Mila; Noemí	Mila; Adara; Noemí	Evicted (Day 86)		
A. David	Alba; Irene; Gianmarco	Hugo; Irene; Nuria	Adara; Joao; Alba	Adara; Joao; Irene	Adara; Irene; Estela	Joao; Pol; Adara	Joao; Pol; Adara (2) Joao	Joao; Adara; Alba	Hugo; Joao; Adara	Alba; Noemí; Adara	Estela; Adara; Mila	Evicted (Day 79)			
Hugo	Joao; Anabel; Irene	Noemí; Kiko; Mila	Evicted (Day 16)				Nominated	Exempt	A. David; Estela; Mila	A. David; Noemí; Mila	Re-Evicted (Day 72)				
Joao	Hugo; Gianmarco; Irene	Hugo; Dinio; Noemí	Dinio; Irene; Gianmarco	Kiko; Irene; Gianmarco	Irene; Gianmarco; Alba	Cejas; Alba; Noemí	A. David; Alba; Estela (1) A. David	A. David; Noemí; Alba	A. David; Estela; Alba	Evicted (Day 65)					
Gianmarco	Irene; Alba; Joao	Hugo; Dinio; Irene	Adara; Irene; Joao	Mila; Joao; Irene	Estela; Irene; Joao	(6) Cejas	Alba; Mila; Estela	Alba; Noemí; Estela	Evicted (Day 58)				Guest (Day 92-93)	Evicted (Day 58)	
Pol	Not in House				Exempt	(4) Cejas (2) Alba	A. David; Alba; Mila	Evicted (Day 51)							
Cejas	Gianmarco; Hugo; Adara	Hugo; Dinio; Estela	Adara; Irene; Estela	Adara; Irene; Estela	Adara; Estela; Irene	(6) Pol	Nominated	Re-Evicted (Day 51)							
Irene	Adara; Gianmarco; Hugo	Hugo; Dinio; Mila	Dinio; Adara; Gianmarco	Adara; Joao; Gianmarco	Joao; Adara; Cejas	Evicted (Day 37)									
Kiko	Irene; Noemí; Nuria	Dinio; Hugo; Nuria	Adara; Dinio; Noemí	Mila; Alba; Joao	Evicted (Day 30)		Nominated	Re-Evicted (Day 49)							
Dinio	Irene; Hugo; Gianmarco	Noemí; Kiko; Gianmarco	Joao; Irene; Estela	Evicted (Day 23)											
Nuria	Gianmarco; Anabel; Kiko	Hugo; Dinio; Alba	Evacuated (Day 14)												
Anabel	Hugo; Nuria; Gianmarco	Evicted (Day 9)													
Notes	1, 2	3, 4	5	5	6, 7	2, 8	5, 9, 10	5, 11	5	12	2	none	13	14	
Nominated (pre-HoH)	Gianmarco; Hugo; Irene	Dinio; Hugo; Noemí	Adara; Dinio; Irene	Adara; Joao; Kiko	Adara; Estela; Irene	Cejas; Joao; Pol	Alba; A. David; Gianmarco	Adara; Alba; A. David; Joao	Adara; A. David; Hugo	none	Adara; A. David; Estela	none			
Saved (by HoH)	Gianmarco	none	Irene	none		Joao	A. David	A. David	A. David	none	Estela	none			
Nominated for eviction	Anabel; Hugo; Irene	Dinio; Hugo; Noemí	Adara; Dinio; Mila	Adara; Joao; Kiko	Adara; Estela; Irene	Alba; Cejas; Pol	Alba; Gianmarco; Pol	Adara; Alba; Gianmarco; Joao	Adara; Hugo; Joao	Adara; A. David; Hugo; Mila; Noemí	Adara; A. David; Mila	Adara; Estela; Mila	Adara; Alba; Mila; Noemí	Adara; Alba; Mila	
Evacuated	none	Nuria	none												
Evicted	Anabel; 57.8% to evict (out of 2)	Hugo; 55.2% to evict (out of 2)	Dinio; 56.7% to evict (out of 2)	Kiko; 72.9% to evict (out of 2)	Irene; 76.2% to evict (out of 2)	Cejas; 50.5% to evict (out of 2)	Pol; 50.9% to evict (out of 2)	Gianmarco; 59.7% to evict (out of 2)	Joao; 60.3% to evict (out of 2)	Hugo; 52.5% to evict (out of 2)	A. David; 55.9% to evict (out of 2)	Estela; 65.9% to evict (out of 2)	Noemí; 4.6% to save	Mila; 11.3% to win (out of 3)	Alba; 43.7% to win (out of 2)
Evicted	Anabel; 57.8% to evict (out of 2)	Hugo; 55.2% to evict (out of 2)	Dinio; 56.7% to evict (out of 2)	Kiko; 72.9% to evict (out of 2)	Irene; 76.2% to evict (out of 2)	Cejas; 50.5% to evict (out of 2)	Pol; 50.9% to evict (out of 2)	Gianmarco; 59.7% to evict (out of 2)	Joao; 60.3% to evict (out of 2)	Hugo; 52.5% to evict (out of 2)	A. David; 55.9% to evict (out of 2)	Estela; 65.9% to evict (out of 2)	Noemí; 4.6% to save	Adara; 56.3% to win (out of 2)	

=== Notes ===
This housemate was the Head of Household.
This housemate was directly nominated for eviction prior to the regular nominations process.
This housemate was granted immunity from nominations.

- ^Note 1 : The public could have the chance via the Internet to give 5 housemates the chance to nominate in private. Adara, Antonio David, Diego, Mila and Noemí were chosen.
- ^Note 2 : The HoH won the power to save one of the nominees.
- ^Note 3 : The HoHs won the right to nominate in the diary room and also the power to save a nominated housemate. Adara and Antonio David didn't agree to save a housemate and the nominees remained the same.
- ^Note 4 : Nuria was forced to leave the house due to medical reasons.
- ^Note 5 : The HoH won the power to save one of the nominees and replace him/her with another housemate.
- ^Note 6 : As a new housemate, Pol was exempt from nominations.
- ^Note 7 : The HoHs won the power to save one of the nominees but they didn't use it.
- ^Note 8 : Due to the weekly task, there were two teams, Red team (Alba, Diego, Gianmarco, Noemí and Pol) and White team (Adara, Antonio David, Estela, Joao and Mila). The Red team won a challenge and they had the privilege to split 6 points as they pleased.
- ^Note 9 : On this round, Joao won the privilege to give one extra point; Antonio David, to give two extra points and Estela, to split 6 points as she pleased.
- ^Note 10 : The public voted among the evicted housemates and the 3 with most votes entered on Day 47. Diego, Hugo and Kiko received the most votes to re-enter.
- ^Note 11 : Hugo was exempt from nominations as he returned to the house as an official housemate.
- ^Note 12 : The HoH won the power to nominate automatically a housemate, Estela nominated Hugo.
- ^Note 13 : Lines were opened to vote to save. The housemate with fewest votes would be evicted.
- ^Note 14 : Lines were opened to vote for the winner.

== Nominations total received ==
	Week 1	Week 2	Week 3	Week 4	Week 5	Week 6	Week 7	Week 8	Week 9	Week 10	Week 11	Week 12	Week 13	Final	Total
Adara	4	-	24	17	16	2	2	12	6	9	9	9	-	Winner	110
Alba	5	1	1	3	5	8	14	7	2	4	-	5	-	Runner-up	55
Mila	1	5	3	7	-	0	5	-	3	5	5	7	-	Third Place	41
Noemí	2	9	1	0	-	2	-	5	-	5	3	2	-	Evicted	29
Estela	0	1	2	2	12	-	2	1	4	-	7	7	Evicted		38
A. David	3	-	3	0	2	1	10	7	15	13	12	Evicted			66
Hugo	19	31	Evicted				-	-	14	-	Re-Evicted				64
Joao	5	1	7	10	7	9	7	13	4	Evicted					63
Gianmarco	19	1	5	8	3	2	9	3	Evicted						50
Pol	Not in House				-	17	8	Evicted							25
Cejas	0	2	-	-	7	19	-	Re-Evicted							28
Irene	19	4	9	8	8	Evicted									48
Kiko	3	4	-	11	Evicted		-	Re-Evicted							18
Dinio	-	22	17	Evicted											39
Nuria	3	3	Evacuated												6
Anabel	7	Evicted													7

== Debate: Blind results ==
Week	1stPlace to Evict	2ndPlace to Evict	3rdPlace to Evict	4thPlace to Evict	5thPlace to Evict
1	80.4%	15.1%	4.5%		
1	76.7%	18.3%	5.0%		
1	62.6%	19.9%	17.5%		
1	71.3%	28.7%			
1	66.8%	33.2%			
1	62.6%	37.4%			
1	60.0%	40.0%			
1	59.5%	40.5%			
2	63.7%	33.5%	2.8%		
2	61.8%	35.2%	3.0%		
2	62.2%	34.3%	3.5%		
2	60.7%	35.7%	3.6%		
2	55.2%	40.6%	4.2%		
2	53.3%	46.7%			
2	52.5%	47.5%			
2	52.8%	47.2%			
2	54.3%	45.7%			
2	50.8%	49.2%			
2	53.2%	46.8%			
2	54.7%	45.3%			
3	76.9%	14.5%	8.6%		
3	71.9%	18.6%	9.5%		
3	65.2%	26.2%	8.6%		
3	58.8%	33.0%	8.2%		
3	56.9%	35.3%	7.8%		
3	49.9%	42.5%	7.6%		
3	52.6%	47.4%			
3	51.8%	48.2%			
3	50.4%	49.6%			
3	51.9%	48.1%			
3	54.5%	45.5%			
3	55.4%	44.6%			
3	55.9%	44.1%			
4	75.0%	22.2%	2.8%		
4	75.9%	20.9%	3.2%		
4	77.8%	16.9%	5.3%		
4	80.5%	19.5%			
4	72.9%	27.1%			
5	65.8%	32.2%	2.0%		
5	51.2%	30.3%	18.5%		
5	47.7%	37.1%	15.2%		
5	65.9%	22.8%	11.3%		
5	72.8%	27.2%			
5	76.8%	23.2%			
6	51.7%	33.0%	15.3%		
6	39.7%	34.8%	25.5%		
6	35.4%	33.7%	30.9%		
6	37.8%	31.5%	30.7%		
6	39.6%	36.2%	24.2%		
6	39.6%	35.6%	24.8%		
6	39.4%	32.4%	28.2%		
6	54.3%	45.7%			
6	54.0%	46.0%			
6	52.3%	47.7%			
6	50.9%	49.1%			
6	50.5%	49.5%			
7	50.5%	48.2%	1.3%		
7	40.5%	37.1%	22.4%		
7	53.8%	46.2%			
7	50.3%	49.7%			
8	51.1%	26.6%	20.7%	1.6%	
8	47.8%	26.9%	22.9%	2.4%	
8	42.9%	28.1%	27.1%	1.9%	
8	62.3%	37.7%			
8	64.2%	35.8%			
8	63.9%	36.1%			
9	50.9%	41.9%	7.2%		
9	48.1%	42.4%	9.5%		
9	47.1%	40.3%	12.6%		
9	44.9%	36.9%	18.2%		
9	58.8%	41.2%			
9	60.3%	39.7%			
10	54.9%	27.8%	12.1%	4.4%	0.8%
10	55.7%	24.0%	13.0%	5.0%	2.3%
10	49.1%	32.3%	11.9%	4.8%	1.9%
10	47.9%	41.1%	11.0%		
10	47.5%	43.8%	8.7%		
10	52.7%	47.3%			
11	58.6%	40.3%	1.1%		
11	58.1%	40.1%	1.8%		
11	54.9%	43.4%	1.7%		
11	54.7%	44.1%	1.2%		
11	56.6%	43.4%			
11	53.7%	46.3%			
11	55.9%	44.1%			
12	83.7%	14.2%	2.1%		
12	66.2%	30.1%	3.7%		
12	52.4%	44.1%	3.5%		
12	52.8%	47.2%			
12	58.5%	41.5%			
13	45.1%	42.4%	7.3%	5.2%	
13	45.9%	38.8%	10.7%	4.6%	
14	50.2%	37.4%	12.4%		
14	48.6%	40.1%	11.3%		
14	56.1%	43.9%			

== Repechage ==
Anabel, Nuria, Hugo, Dinio, Kiko, Irene and El Cejas would face an online voting that will decide which 3 of them will return to the house as candidates to officially become as official housemates.

The repechage was officially announced on Day 44 (October 24, 2019). The 3 most voted housemates entered the house on Day 47, Kiko was the housemate with fewest votes on Day 49 and Hugo was the most voted and became an official housemate on Day 51, therefore Diego was re-evicted.

Ex-housemate	%	Day of elimination
Hugo	55,3%	Gala October 31
El Cejas	44,7%	Gala October 31
Kiko	27,9%	Límite 48H October 29
Anabel	10,6%	Debate October 27
Dinio	1,3%	Debate October 27
Irene	1,0%	Debate October 27
Nuria	0,6%	Debate October 27

== Ratings ==
=== "Galas" ===
Show N°	Day	Viewers	Ratings share
1 – Launch	Wednesday, September 11	2.529.000	24.6%
2	Thursday, September 12	2.725.000	28.3%
3	Thursday, September 19	2.944.000	30.8%
4	Thursday, September 26	2.769.000	29.6%
5	Thursday, October 3	2.869.000	30.2%
6	Thursday, October 10	3.629.000	35.6%
7	Thursday, October 17	2.869.000	29.3%
8	Thursday, October 24	3.224.000	32.3%
9	Thursday, October 31	3.133.000	32.1%
10	Thursday, November 7	3.492.000	33.6%
11	Thursday, November 14	3.354.000	33.2%
12	Thursday, November 21	3.611.000	35.3%
13	Thursday, November 28	3.662.000	35.8%
14	Thursday, December 5	3.837.000	35.7%
15	Thursday, December 12	3.227.000	32.5%
16 – Finale	Thursday, December 19	4.231.000	38.5%

=== "Debates" ===
Show N°	Day	Viewers	Ratings share
1	Sunday, September 15	2.180.000	19.7%
2	Sunday, September 22	2.298.000	20.1%
3	Sunday, September 29	2.521.000	22.3%
4	Sunday, October 6	2.641.000	23.2%
5	Sunday, October 13	2.734.000	24.0%
6	Sunday, October 20	2.368.000	20.1%
7	Sunday, October 27	2.463.000	22.8%
8	Sunday, November 3	2.776.000	23.6%
9	Sunday, November 10	1.985.000	25.0%
10	Sunday, November 17	2.843.000	22.5%
11	Sunday, November 24	2.844.000	22.5%
12	Sunday, December 1	2.835.000	22.8%
13	Sunday, December 8	2.761.000	22.2%
14	Sunday, December 15	2.729.000	22.0%
15	Thursday, December 26	2.285.000	21.9%

=== "Límite 48H" / "Límite 24H" ===
Show N°	Day	Viewers	Ratings share
1	Tuesday, September 17	2.139.000	21.1%
2	Tuesday, September 24	2.317.000	23.0%
3	Tuesday, October 1	2.698.000	26.1%
4	Tuesday, October 8	3.030.000	29.3%
5	Tuesday, October 15	2.547.000	24.7%
6	Tuesday, October 22	2.393.000	24.3%
7	Tuesday, October 29	2.602.000	26.4%
8	Tuesday, November 5	2.979.000	28.8%
9	Tuesday, November 12	2.846.000	27.3%
10	Tuesday, November 19	2.765.000	27.4%
11	Tuesday, November 26	2.857.000	26.6%
12	Tuesday, December 3	3.222.000	30.7%
13	Wednesday, December 11	2.699.000	26.3%
