= Big Brother 17 =

Big Brother 17 is the seventeenth season of various versions of television show Big Brother and may refer to:

- Big Brother 17 (U.S.), the 2015 edition of the U.S. version
- Big Brother 17 (UK), the 2016 edition of the UK version
- Gran Hermano 17, the 2016 edition of the Spanish version
- Big Brother Brasil 17, the 2017 edition of the Brazilian version
- Bigg Boss 17, seventeenth season of Big Brother in India in Hindi
