= Gran Hermano (Spanish TV series) season 18 =

Gran Hermano
- Season 18
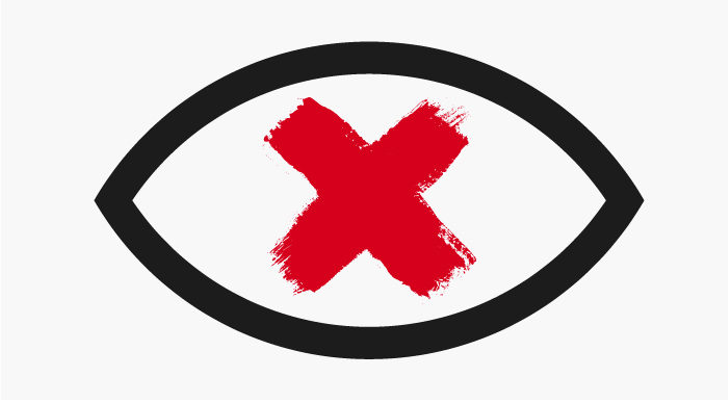
- Presented by: Jorge Javier Vazquez
- No. of days: 89
- No. of housemates: 21
- Winner: Hugo Sierra
- Runner-up: Rubén Valle
- No. of episodes: 14

Release
- Original network: Telecinco
- Original release: September 19 – December 14, 2017

Season chronology
- ← Previous; Season 17 Next → Season 19

Gran Hermano Revolution, also known as Gran Hermano 18, is the eighteenth season of Gran Hermano, the Spanish version of the reality television series franchise Big Brother.

The 18th season started airing on September 19, 2017 on Telecinco with Jorge Javier Vázquez hosting the main live shows or "Galas". The season ended on December 14, 2017 with Uruguayan contestant Hugo Sierra emerging as the winner. At the age of 44, he became the oldest winner of Gran Hermano and the second foreigner to win after Naiala in season 8.

== Housemates ==
On Sunday, September 17, 2017 (Day -2), a total of 100 potential housemates entered the house. It was revealed on the next day, Monday, September 18, 2017, during a special pre-launch show called "Llega La Revolution". On the following day, September 19, 2017, the actual Live Launch date, that only 20 of the 100 initial candidates would survive the experiment and will become the final housemates of the series. On Launch night, only 18 (Carlos, Carlota, Christian, Cristian, Hugo, Javier, Juan, Laura, Maico, Miguel, Mina, Miriam, Petra, Pilar, Nerea, Rubén, Yangyang & Yolanda) were announced by producers. After the remaining 82 candidates failed to pick one of their own to move-in, the remaining 2 spots were automatically given to the public to choose their favorites (Daniel & José María), who entered on Day 2 (Thursday, September 21, 2017).

Housemates	Age	Residence	Occupation	Official entrance	Exited	Status
Hugo Sierra	43	Palma (originally from Uruguay)	Personal trainer and pilates instructor	Day 1	Day 89	Winner
Rubén Valle	21	Vigo	Automation robotics technician	Day 1	Day 89	Runner-up
Christian Gabaldón	29	Sagunto	Driver and waiter	Day 1	Day 89	3rd Place
Yangyang Huang	30	Lanzarote (originally fron China)	Chinese teacher	Day 1	Day 89	4th Place
Pilar Marcellán	19	Zaragoza	Student	Day 1	Day 82	17th Evicted
Miriam Santiago	21	A Coruña	Martial arts instructor	Day 47	Day 82	3rd Evicted
Miriam Santiago	21	A Coruña	Martial arts instructor	Day 1	Day 26	16th Evicted
Carlos Bernal	27	Barcelona	Chef and gastronomy advisor	Day 1	Day 82	15th Evicted
Maico Barzagui	42	Valle del Sol, Murcia	Gardener	Day 1	Day 75	14th Evicted
Lorena Gómez	22	Cádiz	Model and motorcycle racing hostess	Day 61	Day 75	13th Evicted
Carlota Prado	24	Estepona	Pub promoter	Day 1	Day 68	12th Evicted
Mina Navarro	34	Ibiza	Hotel clerk	Day 1	Day 61	11th Evicted
Laura Velasco	25	Sevilla	Pharmacy technician	Day 47	Day 59	Walked
Laura Velasco	25	Sevilla	Pharmacy technician	Day 1	Day 40	5th Evicted
Miguel Del Villar	42	Añezcar, Navarre	Shoemaker	Day 1	Day 54	10th Evicted
Cristian Fernández	30	Barcelona	Salesman	Day 1	Day 54	9th Evicted
Daniel Sánchez	27	Madrid	Zumba instructor	Day 5	Day 54	8th Evicted
José María López	24	Torre-Pacheco	Farmer	Day 5	Day 49	Ejected
Juan Labory	26	Berlin	Graphic and fashion designer	Day 1	Day 47	7th Evicted
Petra Adrover	30	Ibiza	VIP event organizer	Day 1	Day 40	6th Evicted
Javier Eneme	29	Barcelona	Lawyer and dancer	Day 1	Day 33	4th Evicted
Yolanda Garrote	21	Valencia	Gastronomy businesswoman	Day 1	Day 19	2nd Evicted
Nerea Montaraz	20	El Vendrell	Administration student	Day 1	Day 12	1st Evicted

=== Former potential candidates ===
Before all selected housemates were chosen, 100 candidates entered the house and lived together for two days as part of the selection process. 18 official housemates were initially selected by the production team, while Daniel Sánchez and José María López were later chosen by public vote to complete the 20 housemates lineup.

Lorena Gómez was not selected as an official housemate at the beginning, but she was later entered the house as an official housemate on 16 November 2017 as a replacement for Laura Velasco, who had voluntarily left the show.

The remaining 79 non-selected candidates (in alphabetical order)
Name	Age	Residence	Occupation
Aarón Reyes Fleitas	24	Las Palmas	Waiter
Adriana Morales	20	León	Student and waitress
Alejandro Agell	29	Vilanova i la Geltrú	Manager
Álvaro Martin	35	Madrid	Agricultural engineer
Amy Marqués	30	Madrid (originally from Brasil)	Beauty consultant
América Eloisa Loras	29	Madrid (originally from Guayaramerín, Bolivia)	Event and student stewardess
Ana Climent	21	Alicante	Waitress
Antonio Jort	28	Madrid	Commercial
Baltasar Guerrero	19	Jaén	Law student
Batuel Jonatan Guil	38	Barcelona	Sound technician and animator
Begoña Bautista	35	Valencia	Drone pilot
Carola Gómez	36	Barcelona	Businesswoman
Carolina Caballero	28	Madrid	Commercial
Cristian López	24	La Coruña	Tattoo artist
Cristian Moreira	23	Castellón	Tile factory operator
Christian Rodil	32	Gijón	Social educator
Clara Isabel Rodríguez	18	Cañada Rosal	Breeder
Claudia Paloma Bernat	21	Barcelona	Community manager
Cristian García	29	La Coruña	Postman
Cristina Ramírez	34	Ibiza	Saleswoman
Cristóbal Ángel Castilla	38	Córdoba	Humorist and commercial
David Manzano	32	Puente Genil	University professor
Diego Millán	34	Madrid	Drag queen
Dimas Blanco	21	Viveiro	Tuna Ripper
Enmanuel Oliva	31	Alcalá de Henares	Audiovisual technician
Esther Andreu	30	Salamanca	Store manager
Esther García	33	Colmenar Viejo	Accountant and secretary of management
Eulogio Barandiaran	45	Paris/Leioa	Professor
Eva Amalia Liria	47	Oviedo	Radio announcer and self-employed
Eva Roldán	20	Córdoba	Finance student, model and stewardess
Gerardo Quintero	23	Santa Cruz de Tenerife	Warehouse repo
Héctor Lara	22	Terrassa	Graphic artist
Inés Pedrosa	60	Maspalomas	Saleswoman
Inma Boluda	26	Valencia	Student
Irene Nieto	27	Madrid	Stewardess
Isaac Muñoz	18	Madrid	Professional characterization and makeup student
Ismael Rico	21	Murcia	Unemployed
Izaskun Oruezabala	22	Santa Cruz de Tenerife	Zumba instructor, hairdresser and beautician
Jessica Alborch	35	Alicante	Sales manager, stewardess and coach
Jesús Díez	34	La Rioja	Farmer
Jiazhen Wu (Samuel)	25	Sevilla	Clerk
Joanna Vila	27	Bilbao	Nursing assistant student
Jon Ander Rodríguez	22	Barakaldo	Student
José Montesinos	32	Valencia	Electromechanical
Juan Gámez	27	London	Beauty salon assistant
Juan Ramírez	27	Zurich	Waiter
Laura Di Cesare	20	Madrid	Student
Laura Reveriego	29	Fuengirola	Waitress
Luis Andrés Ayensa	38	Tudela	Motorcycle mechanic
Luis Enrique Inirio	31	Barcelona (originally from Dominican Republic)	Dependent and model
Luis García	21	Zamora	Photographer, currently unemployed
Luis Vázquez	22	Málaga	Secondary Education, clerk and model
Macarena García Herrador	23	Zaragoza	
Manuel Carbón	22	A Estrada	Teacher
Marcus Da Vini	30	Brasil	DJ
María del Carmen Fleitas	43	Palmas	Receptionist and waitress
María Peña	41	Santander	
Marina Osuna	27	Madrid	Unemployed
Marta Molina	19		Law student
Martin Verástegui	26	Barcelona	Publicist
Mercedes Galadí	26	Seville	Nursing student
Miguel Ángel Ulloa	22	Bedmar	Farmer
Miriam Jerez	27	Alcalá de Henares	Social worker
Miriam Martínez	31	Madrid	Professional makeup artist
Nuria Trujillo	18	Seville	Student
Óscar Herrero	44	Madrid	Engineer
Paula Manrique	23		Student of Journalism and Saleswoman
Paula Muñoz	21	Barbate	Student and model
Pedro Joaquín Peña	31	Marbella	Commercial
Raúl Gómez	35	Bilbao	Mechanic and cafeteria owner
Rita Sánchez	25	El Ejido	Packager
Rocío Arjonilla	29	Madrid	Journalist
Román González	24	Badalona	Makro delivery department
Rosa Cuenca	42	Baracaldo	Administrative
Rubén Verdejo	26	Ipswich, UK	Driver
Samuel Mir	30	Barcelona	Comercial
Sara Bermúdez	21	Madrid	Student
Sebastián Martínez	42	Villalbilla (originally from Argentina)	Businessman
Siria López	31	Maspalomas	Sculpted Nail Technician

== Nomination table ==
	Week 1		Week 2	Week 3	Week 4	Week 5		Week 6	Week 7		Week 8	Week 9	Week 10		Week 11	Week 12 Final	
	Day 3	Day 5	Week 2	Week 3	Week 4	Day 33	Day 40	Week 6	Day 47	Day 54	Week 8	Week 9	Day 68	Day 75	Week 11	Week 12 Final	
Hugo	Housemate	Nominated	Mina; Petra; Cristian	Cristian; Petra; Mina	Carlota; Petra; Cristian	Laura; Mina; Carlota	Nominated	Mina; Daniel; Cristian	Mina; Carlos; Cristian	Nominated	Mina; Carlos; Laura	Carlota; Carlos; Pilar	(6) Lorena (1) Carlos (1) Pilar	No; Nominations	No; Nominations	Winner (Day 89)	
Rubén	Housemate	Nerea	Mina; Yolanda; Petra	Petra; Yangyang; Juan	Juan; Petra; Carlota	Laura; Juan; Mina	Nominated	Mina; Daniel; Cristian	Yangyang; Mina; Carlos	Nominated	Mina; Yangyang; Carlos	Yangyang; Carlos; Carlota	(3) Carlos (3) Lorena (3) Yangyang	No; Nominations	No; Nominations	Runner-up (Day 89)	
Christian	Housemate	Nerea	Yolanda; Petra; Mina	Yangyang; Miriam; Juan	Javier; Maico; Yangyang	Hugo; Maico; Laura	Nominated	Juan; Hugo; Maico	Maico; Yangyang	Nominated	Maico; Yangyang; Laura	Yangyang; Miriam; Maico	(2) Maico (1) Yangyang (1) Lorena	No; Nominations	No; Nominations	Third Place (Day 89)	
Yangyang	Housemate	Nerea	Maico; Hugo; José Maria	Maico; Christian; José Maria	Maico; Javier; Christian	Maico; Miguel; José Maria	Nominated	Maico; Miguel; José Maria	Maico; Rubén; Miguel	Nominated	Maico; Christian; Rubén	Maico; Rubén; Christian	(1) Maico (1) Rubén (1) Christian	No; Nominations	No; Nominations	Fourth Place (Day 89)	
Pilar	Housemate	Nerea	Hugo; Yolanda; Laura	Laura; Miriam; Hugo	Laura; Hugo; Rubén	Laura; Rubén; Hugo	Nominated	Mina; Maico; Rubén	Mina; Maico	Nominated	Mina; Maico; Miriam	Miriam; Maico; Hugo	(1) Maico (2) Hugo (1) Rubén	No; Nominations	No; Nominations	Evicted (Day 82)	
Miriam	Housemate	Nominated	Yolanda; Juan; Maico	Petra; Daniel; Mina	Evicted (Day 26)				Guest	Exempt	Pilar; Maico; Christian	Carlota; Pilar; Maico	(2) Christian (3) Pilar (6) Hugo	No; Nominations	No; Nominations	Evicted (Day 82)	
Carlos	Housemate	Nerea	Miguel; Hugo; Maico	Hugo; Laura; Javier	Javier; Maico; Hugo	Hugo; Maico; Miguel	Nominated	Juan; Maico; Miguel	Maico; Daniel; Hugo	Nominated	Maico; Yangyang; Hugo	Maico; Hugo; Yangyang	(1) Maico (1) Yangyang (1) Rubén	No; Nominations	No; Nominations	Evicted (Day 82)	
Maico	Housemate	Nominated	Mina; Cristian; Yangyang	Yangyang; Javier; Carlos	Javier; Yangyang; Carlota	Carlota; Laura; Yangyang	Nominated	Mina; Daniel; Cristian	Mina; Carlos; Yangyang	Nominated	Laura; Yangyang; Mina	Carlos; Carlota; Yangyang	(3) Carlos (3) Christian (2) Yangyang	No; Nominations	Evicted (Day 75)		
Lorena	Not chosen (Day 5)	Not in House										Exempt	(1) Maico (1) Hugo (2) Rubén	Evicted (Day 75)			
Carlota	Housemate	Nerea	Hugo; Yangyang; Juan	Yangyang; Hugo; Maico	Maico; Hugo; Yangyang	Maico; Hugo; Yangyang	Exempt	Maico; Hugo; Rubén	Maico; Yangyang	Exempt	Maico; Hugo; Laura	Miriam; Maico; Yangyang	Evicted (Day 68)				
Mina	Housemate	Nerea	Yolanda; Miguel; Hugo	Hugo; Miriam; Laura	Javier; Hugo; Maico	Hugo; Maico; Rubén	Nominated	Hugo; Pilar; Maico	Pilar; Hugo; Maico	Nominated	Pilar; Maico; Rubén	Evicted (Day 61)					
Laura	Housemate	Nerea	Juan; Yolanda; Hugo	Petra; Cristian; Juan	Maico; Hugo; Yangyang	Maico; Hugo; Rubén	Evicted (Day 40)		Guest	Exempt	Pilar; Carlos; Maico	Walked (Day 59)					
Miguel	Housemate	Nerea	Javier; Mina; Hugo	Daniel; Yangyang; Hugo	Javier; Yangyang; Daniel	Hugo; Yangyang; Laura	Nominated	Carlos; Mina; Daniel	Yangyang; Mina	Nominated	Evicted (Day 54)						
Cristian	Housemate	Nerea	Hugo; Yolanda; Maico	Hugo; Laura; Yangyang	Hugo; Javier; Maico	Hugo; Maico; Rubén	Nominated	Juan; Maico; Hugo	Daniel; Maico; Hugo	Nominated	Evicted (Day 54)						
Daniel	Chosen (Day 5)	Nerea	Hugo; Miguel; Yolanda	Laura; Miriam; Hugo	Maico; Hugo; Laura	Maico; Rubén; Hugo	Nominated	Cristian; Maico; Hugo	Mina; Maico	Evicted (Day 54)							
José María	Chosen (Day 5)	Nerea	Juan; Yangyang; Mina	Yangyang; Juan; Maico	Yangyang; Maico; Javier	Maico; Hugo; Yangyang	Nominated	Maico; Mina; Juan	Maico; Yangyang	Ejected (Day 49)							
Juan	Housemate	Nerea	Laura; Yolanda; Miguel	Laura; Miriam; Rubén	Rubén; Laura; José Maria	Rubén; Laura; Maico	Nominated	Carlos; Cristian; Christian	Evicted (Day 47)								
Petra	Housemate	Nerea	Hugo; Miguel; Yolanda	Hugo; Miriam; Laura	Hugo; Rubén; Laura	Hugo; Rubén; Maico	Nominated	Evicted (Day 40)									
Javier	Housemate	Nerea	Miguel; Yolanda; Maico	Maico; Yangyang; Hugo	Maico; Yangyang; Christian	Evicted (Day 33)											
Yolanda	Housemate	Nerea	Mina; Laura; Javier	Evicted (Day 19)													
Nerea	Housemate	Nominated	Evicted (Day 12)														
Nomination notes	1	2	3, 4	4	4	none	5	none	6, 7	8	none	9	10, 11	12			
Nominated (pre-save & replace)	none	Nerea; Yolanda; Maico	Hugo; Mina; Yolanda	Hugo; Laura; Yangyang	Hugo; Javier; Maico	none			Maico; Mina; Yangyang	none							
Saved	none	Yolanda	Mina	Laura	Hugo	none			Yangyang	none							
Nominated for eviction	none	Hugo & Miriam; Maico; Nerea	Hugo; Miguel; Yolanda	Hugo; Miriam; Yangyang	Javier; Maico; Yangyang	Hugo; Laura; Maico	Carlos; Cristian; Christian; Daniel; Hugo; José Maria; Juan; Maico; Miguel; Mina; Petra; Pilar; Rubén; Yangyang	Juan; Maico; Mina	Carlos; Daniel; Maico; Mina	Carlos; Christian; Cristian; Hugo; Maico; Miguel; Mina; Pilar; Rubén; Yangyang	Maico; Mina; Pilar	Carlota; Maico; Yangyang	Carlos; Hugo; Lorena; Yangyang	All; Housemates		Christian; Hugo; Rubén; Yangyang	
Walked	none										Laura	none					
Ejected	none								José Maria	none							
Evicted	Daniel; Most votes to enter (out of 82)	Nerea; 16 of 16 votes to evict	Yolanda; 52.7% to evict (out of 2)	Miriam; 57,8% to evict (out of 2)	Javier; Most votes to evict (out of 2)	Laura; 54.3% to evict	Petra; 1% to save	Juan; 51.9% to evict	Daniel; 52.15% to evict (out of 2)	Cristian; 3% to save	Mina; 69.9% to evict (out of 2)	Carlota; 60.5% to evict (out of 2)	Lorena; 80% to evict (out of 2)	Maico; Fewest votes to save	Carlos; Fewest votes to save (out of 7)	Yangyang; Fewest votes to win (out of 4)	Christian; Fewest votes to win (out of 3)
Evicted	Daniel; Most votes to enter (out of 82)	Nerea; 16 of 16 votes to evict	Yolanda; 52.7% to evict (out of 2)	Miriam; 57,8% to evict (out of 2)	Javier; Most votes to evict (out of 2)	Laura; 54.3% to evict	Petra; 1% to save	Juan; 51.9% to evict	Daniel; 52.15% to evict (out of 2)	Cristian; 3% to save	Mina; 69.9% to evict (out of 2)	Carlota; 60.5% to evict (out of 2)	Lorena; 80% to evict (out of 2)	Maico; Fewest votes to save	Miriam; Fewest votes to save (out of 6)	Yangyang; Fewest votes to win (out of 4)	Christian; Fewest votes to win (out of 3)
Evicted	José Maria; Most votes to enter (out of 82)	Nerea; 16 of 16 votes to evict	Yolanda; 52.7% to evict (out of 2)	Miriam; 57,8% to evict (out of 2)	Javier; Most votes to evict (out of 2)	Laura; 54.3% to evict	Petra; 1% to save	Juan; 51.9% to evict	Daniel; 52.15% to evict (out of 2)	Miguel; 3% to save	Mina; 69.9% to evict (out of 2)	Carlota; 60.5% to evict (out of 2)	Lorena; 80% to evict (out of 2)	Maico; Fewest votes to save	Miriam; Fewest votes to save (out of 6)	Rubén; 30.5% to win (out of 2)	Hugo; 69.5% to win (out of 2)
Evicted	José Maria; Most votes to enter (out of 82)	Nerea; 16 of 16 votes to evict	Yolanda; 52.7% to evict (out of 2)	Miriam; 57,8% to evict (out of 2)	Javier; Most votes to evict (out of 2)	Laura; 54.3% to evict	Petra; 1% to save	Juan; 51.9% to evict	Daniel; 52.15% to evict (out of 2)	Miguel; 3% to save	Mina; 69.9% to evict (out of 2)	Carlota; 60.5% to evict (out of 2)	Lorena; 80% to evict (out of 2)	Maico; Fewest votes to save	Pilar; Fewest votes to save (out of 5)	Rubén; 30.5% to win (out of 2)	Hugo; 69.5% to win (out of 2)

=== Notes ===
- ^Note 1: On September 17, 100 potential housemates entered the house. 18 official housemates were selected by Gran Hermano. The viewers will choose the final two housemates. The two potential housemates who received the most votes will enter the house on Day 2 (September 21). It was revealed they are Daniel Sánchez & José María López. They were exempt from nominations as they were new housemates.
- ^Note 2: In Gala 2, Nerea, Yolanda & Maico were nominated by the public. Carlos won the power of salvation. He decided to save Yolanda. Hugo received the next highest number of votes and he was nominated for eviction with Miriam.
- ^Note 3: After being saved by the housemates, Hugo and Miriam were separated and could participate individually.
- ^Note 4: A member of the public entered the house and saved a nominated housemate. The next housemate with the most votes at the nominations was put up for eviction afterward.
- ^Note 5: A twist was unleashed on the house: all contestants were given the option to press a button and whoever did it first will be immune for three weeks. However, if one (or more) press the button a new eviction will be held and the person with the fewest votes will leave. Carlota pressed the button first, earning immunity, and Petra was evicted as the one with the fewest votes to save.
- ^Note 6: The housemates were split into two teams, the Black team (Mina, Yangyang, Hugo, Rubén, Maico, Cristian and Carlos) and the Red team (Carlota, Pilar, Christian, Daniel, Miguel and José María). They competed in a task and the losing team would nominate just with 2 and 1 points. The black team won and was able to nominate with 3, 2 and 1 points.
- ^Note 7: On Day 44, due to the low number of women in the house, the evicted female housemates faced public voting and the two with most votes re-entered the house for a week. Laura and Miriam were chosen to re-enter and they could save a nominated housemate along with the rest of the female housemates. They saved Yangyang. Carlos and Daniel received the next highest number of votes and they were nominated for eviction.
- ^Note 8: On Day 51, the public decided that Laura and Miriam could stay in the house as official housemates. However, two housemates would be evicted to replace them through voting to save.
- ^Note 9: Lorena was exempt from nominations as she was a new housemate.
- ^Note 10: Before nominations, Miriam won immunity in a task.
- ^Note 11: The housemates could nominate in three rounds, earning in each round several points in a race.
- ^Note 12: Lines were opened to vote for the winner. The housemate with the fewest votes would be evicted.

== Total votes and nominations received ==
	Week 1	Week 2	Week 3	Week 4	Week 5		Week 6	Week 7		Week 8	Week 9	Week 10		Week 11	Final	Total
Hugo	0	22	18	17	26	-	9	4	-	3	3	9	-	-	Winner	111
Rubén	-	0	1	6	12	-	2	2	-	2	2	5	-	-	Runner-Up	32
Christian	-	0	2	2	0	-	1	0	-	3	1	6	-	-	3rd Place	15
Yangyang	-	5	19	12	5	-	0	9	-	8	9	7	-	-	4th Place	74
Pilar	-	0	0	0	0	-	2	3	-	9	3	4	-	-	Evicted	21
Miriam	0	0	12	Evicted				-	-	1	8	-	-	-	Evicted	21
Carlos	-	0	1	0	0	-	6	5	-	5	7	7	-	-	Evicted	31
Maico	0	7	8	23	25	-	19	17	-	19	12	6	-	Evicted		136
Lorena	Not in House										-	10	Evicted			10
Carlota	-	0	0	5	4	-	-	-	-	-	9	Evicted				18
Mina	-	16	2	0	3	-	16	13	-	10	Evicted					60
Laura	-	6	15	7	15	Evicted		-	-	6	Walked					49
Miguel	-	13	0	0	3	-	3	1	-	Evicted						20
Cristian	-	3	5	1	0	-	8	1	-	Evicted						18
Daniel	-	0	5	1	0	-	7	5	Evicted							18
José María	-	1	1	1	1	-	1	0	Ejected							5
Juan	-	9	5	3	2	-	10	Evicted								29
Petra	-	5	11	4	0	-	Evicted									20
Javier	-	4	3	20	Evicted											27
Yolanda	-	23	Evicted													23
Nerea	16	Evicted														16

== Debate: Blind results ==
Week	1st place to evict	2nd place to evict	3rd place to evict	4th place to evict	5th place to evict	6th place to evict	7th place to evict
2	52.9%	37.4%	9.7%				
3	65.9 %	22.7 %	11.4 %				
3	60.4%	27.3%	12.3%				
3	43.9%	42.6%	13.5%				
3	47.1%	41.0%	11.9%				
3	57.8%	42.2%					
4	77.8%	12.1%	10.1%				
4	58.2%	37.4%	4.4%				
4	49.8%	47.4%	2.8%				
5	56.6%	42.6%	0.8%				
5	49.7%	49.5%	0.8%				
5	53.1%	46.2%	0.7%				
5	54.3%	44.2%	1.5%				
6	79.8%	15.4%	4.8%				
6	65.2%	31.5%	3.3%				
7	44.1%	43.0%	9.1%	3.8%			
7	49.4%	41.9%	5.8%	2.9%			
7	49.3%	42.1%	5.5%	3.1%			
8	69.9%	27.5%	2.6%				
8	69.8%	27.8%	2.4%				
9	80.5%	17.3%	2.2%				
10	74.6%	16.7%	5.5%	3.2%			
10	41.4%	27.1%	19.3%	12.2%			
10	72.7%	18.1%	9.2%				
10	80.8%	19.2%					
11	44.5%	13.5%	13.4%	10.2%	7.6%	7.4%	3.4%
11	40.2%	16.8%	13.8%	11.7%	7.7%	7.2%	2.6%
11	40.3%	16.1%	13.4%	12.5%	7.7%	7.1%	2.9%
11	33.8%	17.1%	13.3%	12.1%	11.7%	9.8%	2.2%
12	46.6%	21.9%	16.8%	14.7%			
12	46.6%	23.2%	16.1%	14.1%			
12	54.2%	25.5%	20.3%				

== Repechage ==
On Day 44, due to the low number of women in the house, the evicted female housemates faced a public voting and the two with most votes re-entered the house for a week. Laura and Miriam were chosen to re-enter and they could save a nominated housemate along with the rest of female housemates, and they will play a key part in this week's food task. After Jose María's departure, it was announced that Miriam and/or Laura would be given a second chance to enter the house again as official housemates. The public will decide which one will enter, having the chance to vote for the two of them and also for none of them to enter. If one of them enter the house, one housemate will be evicted as a replacement. If both of them enter the house, then two housemates will be evicted.

Ex-housemate	%
Laura & Miriam	38%
None of them	30%
Miriam	25%
Laura	7%

== Twist ==
=== You are inside ===
After the first eviction, every week a viewer chosen by the random phone call from Gran Hermano, will go into the house with the mission of saving one of the nominated housemates. The housemate who receives the next number of nominations will be nominated for eviction.

Week	Name	Residence	Age	Entry Day	Saved
2	Margarita Suárez	Canarias	82	Gala 3; 28 September 2017	Mina
3	Alba Aparicio	Badajoz	19	Gala 4; 5 October 2017	Laura
4	Elena	Tenerife	28	Gala 5; 12 October 2017	Hugo

== Ratings ==
=== "Galas" ===
Show N°	Day	Viewers	Ratings share
1 – Launch	Tuesday, September 19	1.809.000	16.2%
2	Thursday, September 21	1.516.000	15.7%
3	Thursday, September 28	1.639.000	15.7%
4	Thursday, October 5	1.485.000	14.8%
5	Thursday, October 12	1.596.000	15.3%
6	Thursday, October 19	1.384.000	13.6%
7	Thursday, October 26	1.519.000	15.0%
8	Thursday, November 2	1.276.000	12.2%
9	Thursday, November 9	1.581.000	15.0%
10	Thursday, November 16	1.400.000	13.5%
11	Thursday, November 23	1.252.000	12.0%
12	Thursday, November 30	1.256.000	12.2%
13	Thursday, December 7	1.428.000	13.8%
14 - Final	Thursday, December 14	1.633.000	15.0%

=== "Debates" ===
Show N°	Day	Viewers	Ratings share
1	Sunday, September 24	1.401.000	11.5%
2	Sunday, October 1	1.040.000	8.2%
3	Sunday, October 8	1.231.000	9.9%
4	Sunday, October 15	560.000	11.7%
5	Sunday, October 22	727.000	14.0%
6	Sunday, October 29	499.000	13.0%
7	Sunday, November 5	735.000	14.8%
8	Sunday, November 12	857.000	14.0%
9	Sunday, November 19	843.000	16.4%
10	Sunday, November 26	509.000	9.7%
11	Sunday, December 3	405.000	9.8%
12 - Final	Sunday, December 10	484.000	11.4%

=== "Última Hora" ===
Show N°	Day	Viewers	Ratings share
1	Monday, September 25	1.201.000	6.7%
2	Tuesday, September 26	1.039.000	5.5%
3	Tuesday, October 3	1.100.000	6.1%
4	Tuesday, October 10	904.000	4.8%
5	Tuesday, October 17	897.000	4.6%
6	Tuesday, October 24	1.143.000	6.1%
6	Tuesday, October 24	352.000	7.5%
7	Tuesday, October 31	436.000	6.3%
8	Tuesday, November 7	1.151.000	6.2%
9	Tuesday, November 21	918.000	4.7%
10	Tuesday, November 28	1.211.000	6.3%
11	Tuesday, December 4	1.000.000	5.5%
12 - Final	Tuesday, December 12	1.161.000	6.2%

== Controversies ==
On 19 November 2019, digital newspaper El Confidencial published a video showing that Carlota Prado would have allegedly been the victim in the house of sexual abuse while drunk, perpetrated by her then partner José María López. Production team continued recording the reaction after showing her the video footage. Many (at least 30) sponsor companies retired advertisement from Gran Hermano VIP 7 after this incident.

On 18 April 2023, José María López was sentenced to 15 months in prison for sexually assaulting a reality show contestant.
