= Hugo Castejón =

- Born: Hugo Castejón Fernández-Trujillo; Oviedo, España
- Origin: October 5th, 1971
- Genres: Pop, Reggaeton
- Occupations: Singer, TV showman,
- Years active: 2013–present

Hugo Castejón Fernández-Trujillo is a Spanish pop singer, songwriter and TV showman.

== Early life ==
Hugo Castejón was born in Oviedo, Spain October 5, 1971. He grew up in Madrid and went to high school in Boston. He studied business in Italy and in Philadelphia. In college in Italy, he started a band, acting as lead singer and songwriter.

== Career ==
In 2013, Hugo wrote with co-writer and producer, Carlos Peralta (Maffio) his first song “Dance La Noche”. The song was released in November 2013. It reached the #4 position on iTunes Spain and the top ten in some Latin American countries.

In June 2014, Hugo wrote his second single “You’ll Be Mine”. It reached #1 position on iTunes Spain and was #1 in radio stations of different countries in Latin America. The song's Spanish version, “Vas A Flipar” was presented in Univision's Despierta America with great success.

In May 2015, Hugo released his 3rd single “Fiesta Tonight” in Spanish, reaching #1 position on iTunes Spain. In 2016, "No Te Vayas a Enamorar" was released. In 2018, the singer released his single "Ayer La Vi". In January 2020 he released "Meneo" and performed prime time on Telecinco. In 2022 he released "Te Estas Pillando" with a music video that was banned on YouTube for some weeks because of some supposedly explicit content. Anyways Hugo and his team made a claim and won the case to make the video public again on the platform.

Hugo was named It Boy of the moment by Men's Health Spain and Hombre 10 by Diez Minutos magazine.

=== Discography ===
- Dance La Noche - November 2013
- Dance La Noche, Hugo Castejón Ft. Maffio - November 2013
- You'll Be Mine - June 2014
- Vas a Flipar (Spanish version of You'll Be Mine) - June 2014
- Fiesta Tonight
- Fiesta Tonight Spanish
- No Te Vayas a Enamorar - May 2016
- Ayer La Vi - May 2018
- Meneo - Jan 2020
- Te Estas Pillando - July 2022
- Se Va Pal Club - June 2026
