= Gran Hermano (Spanish TV series) season 17 =

Gran Hermano
- Season 17
- Presented by: Jorge Javier Vazquez
- No. of days: 106
- No. of housemates: 20
- Winner: Beatriz Retamal
- Runner-up: Meritxell Prieto
- No. of episodes: 16

Release
- Original network: Telecinco
- Original release: September 8 – December 22, 2016

Season chronology
- ← Previous; Season 16 Next → Season 18

Gran Hermano 17 is the seventeenth season of Gran Hermano, the Spanish version of the reality television series franchise Big Brother. The 17th season started airing on September 8, 2016, on Telecinco. On Wednesday June 29, Mediaset announced in an official statement that Mercedes Mila left the show after 16 years, and was replaced by Jorge Javier Vázquez.

This season and a €300,000 prize was won by 20-year-old Beatriz Retamal on Day 106.

== Housemates ==
Housemates	Age	Residence	Occupation	Entered	Exited	Status
Beatriz Retamal	19	Picassent	Hairdresser	Day 1 Day 29	Day 29; Day 106	5th Evicted
Beatriz Retamal	19	Picassent	Hairdresser	Day 1 Day 29	Day 29; Day 106	Winner
Meritxell Prieto	20	Cornellà	Nursing student	Day 1	Day 106	Runner-up
Rodrigo Fuertes	26	Madrid	Fashion store's financial worker	Day 1	Day 106	3rd Place
Miguel Vilas	31	Pontevedra	Model	Day 1	Day 99	15th Evicted
Alain Rochette	38	Valencia	Accountant and model	Day 1	Day 92	14th Evicted
Adara Molinero	23	Alcobendas	Flight attendant and model	Day 1	Day 85	13th Evicted
Simona Scorus	26	Madrid	Waitress	Day 64	Day 78	12th Evicted
Clara Toribio	24	Valencia	Saleswoman	Day 1	Day 71	11th Evicted
Noelia Cubero	21	Córdoba	Teaching student	Day 1	Day 64	10th Evicted
Fernando Espinar	26	Sanlúcar	Entrepreneur and sports instructor	Day 1 Day 50	Day 43; Day 60	7th Evicted
Fernando Espinar	26	Sanlúcar	Entrepreneur and sports instructor	Day 1 Day 50	Day 43; Day 60	Ejected
Bárbara Cañuelo	38	Alicante	Vlogger and entrepreneur	Day 1	Day 59	Walked
Pol Badía	22	Barcelona	Professional wrestler	Day 1	Day 57	9th Evicted
Rebeca Ruiz	29	Madrid	Saleswoman	Day 27	Day 50	8th Evicted
Montse Castellví	27	Molins de Rei	Farmer	Day 1 Day 50	Day 36; Day 53	6th Evicted
Candelas Suárez	24	Llanera	PE teacher and waitress	Day 1 Day 50	Day 22; Day 57	4th Evicted
Pablo Rodríguez	21	London / Zamora	Waffle seller	Day 1 Day 50	Day 15; Day 57	3rd Evicted
Pablo Rodríguez	21	London / Zamora	Waffle seller	Day 1 Day 50	Day 15; Day 57	Walked
Álvaro Requerey	32	Sevilla	Architect and clothing designer	Day 1	Day 15	Ejected
Cris de León	25	Ubrique	Computer engineer	Day 1	Day 8	2nd Evicted
Laura Ríos	20	Cornellà	Dental student	Day 1	Day 8	1st Evicted

== Nomination table ==
	Week 1	Week 2	Week 3	Week 4	Week 5	Week 6	Week 7	Week 8	Week 9	Week 10	Week 11	Week 12	Week 13	Week 14	Week 15 Final	
Beatriz	No; Nominations	Pablo; Candelas; Alain	Bárbara; Candelas; Meritxell	Montse; Alain; Adara	Bárbara; Fernando; Alain	Fernando; Rebeca; Meritxell	Rodrigo	Bárbara; Alain; Adara	No; Nominations	Meritxell; Adara; Alain	Meritxell; Simona; Alain	Alain; Meritxell; Adara	No; Nominations	No; Nominations	Winner (Day 106)	
Meritxell	Nominated	Clara; Adara; Noelia	Fernando; Clara; Rodrigo	Adara; Bárbara; Fernando	Adara; Bárbara; Fernando	Adara; Fernando; Bárbara	Beatriz	Adara; Bárbara; Miguel	No; Nominations	Clara; Miguel; Rodrigo	Simona; Rodrigo; Miguel	Adara; Miguel; Alain	No; Nominations	No; Nominations	Runner-Up (Day 106)	
Rodrigo	No; Nominations	Candelas; Meritxell; Fernando	(6) Bárbara (4) Candelas (2) Meritxell	Bárbara; Adara; Montse	Montse; Alain; Pol	Rebeca; Bárbara; Alain	Beatriz	Bárbara; Adara; Alain	No; Nominations	Adara; Meritxell; Alain	Meritxell; Adara; Simona	Adara; Meritxell; Alain	No; Nominations	No; Nominations	Third Place (Day 106)	
Miguel	No; Nominations	Bárbara; Pablo; Candelas	Bárbara; Meritxell; Alain	Bárbara; Adara; Alain	Bárbara; Montse; Alain	Alain; Bárbara; Noelia	Clara	Bárbara; Adara; Alain	No; Nominations	Adara; Meritxell; Alain	Adara; Mertixell; Simona	Alain; Meritxell; Adara	No; Nominations	No; Nominations	Evicted (Day 99)	
Alain	No; Nominations	Miguel; Adara; Pol	Adara; Miguel; Montse	Miguel; Adara; Noelia	Bárbara; Noelia; Miguel	Noelia; Miguel; Beatriz	Meritxell	Adara; Noelia; Miguel	No; Nominations	Adara; Beatriz; Rodrigo	Adara; Beatriz; Rodrigo	Adara; Miguel; Rodrigo	No; Nominations	Evicted (Day 92)		
Adara	No; Nominations	Candelas; Pablo; Meritxell	Rodrigo; Montse; Alain	Rodrigo; Miguel; Beatriz	Miguel; Meritxell; Montse	Fernando; Clara; Meritxell	Pol	Clara; Miguel; Alain	No; Nominations	Clara; Miguel; Alain	Miguel; Simona; Rodrigo	Meritxell; Miguel; Alain	Evicted (Day 85)			
Simona	Not in House									Exempt	Adara; Meritxell; Beatriz	Evicted (Day 78)				
Clara	No; Nominations	Meritxell; Pablo; Candelas	Meritxell; Bárbara; Candelas	Adara; Bárbara; Meritxell	Adara; Bárbara; Pol	Adara; Pol; Bárbara	Miguel	Adara; Bárbara; Noelia	No; Nominations	Adara; Meritxell; Alain	Evicted (Day 71)					
Noelia	No; Nominations	Pablo; Meritxell; Bárbara	Alain; Fernando; Meritxell	Bárbara; Alain; Fernando	(6) Bárbara	Bárbara; Alain; Pol	Beatriz	Alain; Bárbara; Mertixell	No; Nominations	Evicted (Day 64)						
Fernando	Nominated	Barbara; Rodrigo; Meritxell	Candelas; Meritxell; Noelia	Montse; Bárbara; Noelia	Bárbara; Adara; Noelia	Not; Eligible	Evicted (Day 43)	Secret; Room	No; Nominations	Ejected (Day 60)						
Bárbara	No; Nominations	Miguel; Fernando; Montse	Clara; Miguel; Rodrigo	Rodrigo; Miguel; Beatriz	Fernando; Clara; Beatriz	Fernando; Noelia; Rebeca	Adara	Refused	No; Nominations	Walked (Day 59)						
Pol	No; Nominations	Candelas; Montse; Alain	Montse; Noelia; Alain	Bárbara; Montse; Noelia	Montse; Rodrigo; Clara	Clara; Noelia; Bárbara	Adara	Clara; Noelia; Alain	Evicted (Day 57)							
Rebeca	Not in House			Nominated	Exempt	Beatriz; Bárbara; Adara	Clara	Evicted (Day 50)								
Montse	No; Nominations	Candelas; Meritxell; Alain	Adara; Pol; Bárbara	Adara; Bárbara; Pol	Adara; Bárbara; Pol	Evicted (Day 36)		Secret; Room	Re-Evicted (Day 53)							
Michelle	Not in House			Nominated	Evicted (Day 29)											
Candelas	No; Nominations	Not; Eligible	Beatriz; Fernando; Rodrigo	Evicted (Day 22)				Secret; Room	Re-Evicted (Day 57)							
Pablo	No; Nominations	Miguel; Clara; Adara	ContraClub	Walked (Day 15)				Secret; Room	Re-Evicted (Day 57)							
Álvaro	No; Nominations	Miguel; Candelas; Meritxell	Ejected (Day 15)													
Cris	Nominated	Evicted (Day 8)														
Laura	Nominated	Evicted (Day 8)														
Nomination notes	1	2	3, 4	5	6, 7, 8	9, 10	11, 12	13, 14	15	16, 17	18	19, 20	21			
Against public vote	Laura; Meritxell	Candelas; Meritxell; Miguel; Pablo	Bárbara; Candelas; Meritxell	Adara; Bárbara; Beatriz; Montse	Adara; Bárbara; Montse	Bárbara; Fernando; Noelia	Alain; Bárbara; Rebeca	Adara; Alain; Bárbara; Pol	Adara; Alain; ~~Bárbara~~; Beatriz; Clara; ~~Fernando~~; Meritxell; Miguel; Noelia; Rodrigo	Adara; Alain; Clara	Adara; Meritxell; Simona	Adara; Alain; Meritxell	All housemates		Beatriz; Meritxell; Rodrigo	
Against public vote	Cris; Fernando	Candelas; Meritxell; Miguel; Pablo	Bárbara; Candelas; Meritxell	Michelle; Rebeca	Adara; Bárbara; Montse	Bárbara; Fernando; Noelia	Alain; Bárbara; Rebeca	Adara; Alain; Bárbara; Pol	Adara; Alain; ~~Bárbara~~; Beatriz; Clara; ~~Fernando~~; Meritxell; Miguel; Noelia; Rodrigo	Adara; Alain; Clara	Adara; Meritxell; Simona	Adara; Alain; Meritxell	All housemates		Beatriz; Meritxell; Rodrigo	
Walked	none		Pablo	none					Bárbara	none						
Ejected	none	Álvaro	none						Fernando	none						
Evicted	Laura; Fewest votes to save	Pablo; Most votes to move (out of 2)	Candelas; 52.7% to evict (out of 2)	Beatriz; Most votes to evict (out of 2)	Montse; 73% to evict	Fernando; 57.6% to evict	Rebeca; 54.44% to evict	Pol; 60% to evict (out of 2)	Noelia; 50.18% to evict (out of 2)	Clara; 50.002% to evict (out of 2)	Simona; 58.8% to evict (out of 2)	Adara; Most votes to evict (out of 2)	Alain; Fewest votes to save	Miguel; Fewest votes to save	Rodrigo; 18.4% to win (out of 3)	Meritxell; 40.2% to win (out of 2)
Evicted	Cris; Fewest votes to save	Pablo; Most votes to move (out of 2)	Candelas; 52.7% to evict (out of 2)	Rebeca; Most votes to enter	Montse; 73% to evict	Fernando; 57.6% to evict	Rebeca; 54.44% to evict	Pol; 60% to evict (out of 2)	Noelia; 50.18% to evict (out of 2)	Clara; 50.002% to evict (out of 2)	Simona; 58.8% to evict (out of 2)	Adara; Most votes to evict (out of 2)	Alain; Fewest votes to save	Miguel; Fewest votes to save	Beatriz; 59.8% to win (out of 2)	

=== Notes ===
- ^Note 1 : On Day 1, Laura and Meritxell and Cris and Fernando were automatically nominated as they were the only housemates who entered with a friend, and it takes place as the final phase of the casting.
- ^Note 2 : Pol won the right to enter the Club and to cancel the nominations of a housemate. He chose Candelas.
- ^Note 3 : Pablo was fake evicted and sent to the ContraClub but he decided to leave the house.
- ^Note 4 : The members of the club, Bárbara, Fernando and Pol, won the right to give the power of nomination with 6, 4 and 2 points. They chose to give it to Rodrigo.
- ^Note 5 : The members of the club, Beatriz, Fernando and Pol, won the right to name an extra nominee. They chose to nominate Beatriz.
- ^Note 6 : Rebeca won the public vote and became an official housemate. For this reason she was exempt from nominations.
- ^Note 7 : The members of the club, Miguel, Pol and Rodrigo, won the right to give 6 points to nominate to a housemate. They chose to give them to Noelia.
- ^Note 8 : Beatriz was evicted but she had 5 boxes: the ones from Rodrigo, Clara, Miguel, Montse and herself. She found the extra life inside Montse's box and she could return to the house.
- ^Note 9 : Adara, Bárbara and Beatriz won a public vote and moved the club.
- ^Note 10 : The members of the club, Adara, Bárbara and Beatriz, won the right to cancel the nominations of a housemate. They chose Fernando.
- ^Note 11 : This round of nominations were to save.
- ^Note 12 : The members of the club, Adara, Beatriz and Miguel, won the right to give one extra positive point. They voted for Noelia to get it.
- ^Note 13 : The members of the club, Beatriz, Clara and Miguel, won the right to name an extra nominee. They chose to nominate Pol.
- ^Note 14 : Bárbara refused to use her right to nominate this week.
- ^Note 15 : All housemates were automatically nominated due to their bad behaviour during that week.
- ^Note 16 : Simona was exempt from nominations as she was a new housemate.
- ^Note 17 : The members of the club, Alain, Clara and Miguel, won the right to save a nominee and replace him/her with one of the members of the club. Alain decided to save Meritxell and replace her with himself.
- ^Note 18 : The members of the club, Beatriz, Miguel and Rodrigo, won the right to save a nominee but they decided to not use it.
- ^Note 19 : The relatives' housemates made the nominations instead, themselves.
- ^Note 20 : The members of the club, Adara, Beatriz and Miguel, won the right to give 3 extra points to a nominee and they gave them to Meritxell.
- ^Note 21 : Lines were opened to vote for the winner. The housemate with fewest votes would be evicted.

== Total nominations received ==
	Week 1	Week 2	Week 3	Week 4	Week 5	Week 6	Week 7	Week 8	Week 9	Week 10	Week 11	Week 12	Week 13	Week 14	Week 15	Total
Beatriz	-	0	3	2	1	4	3	0	-	2	3	0	-	-	Winner	12
Meritxell	-	12	11	1	2	2	1	1	-	9	10	12	-	-	Runner-Up	59
Rodrigo	-	2	6	6	2	0	1	0	-	2	4	1	-	-	Third Place	22
Miguel	-	12	4	7	4	2	1	4	-	4	4	6	-	-	Evicted	46
Alain	-	3	6	5	4	6	0	9	-	5	1	9	-	Evicted		48
Adara	-	5	6	16	11	7	2	14	-	14	11	11	Evicted			93
Simona	Not in House									-	9	Evicted				9
Clara	-	5	5	0	3	5	2	6	-	6	Evicted					28
Noelia	-	1	3	3	3	8	1	5	-	Evicted						22
Fernando	-	3	7	2	6	11	Evicted		-	Ejected						29
Bárbara	-	7	15	20	24	12	0	15	-	Walked						93
Pol	-	1	2	1	3	3	1	-	Evicted							9
Rebeca	Not in House			-	-	6	0	Evicted								6
Montse	-	3	6	9	9	Evicted										27
Michelle	Not in House			-	Evicted											0
Candelas	-	18	10	Evicted												28
Pablo	-	12	-	Walked												12
Álvaro	-	0	Ejected													0
Cris	-	Evicted														0
Laura	-	Evicted														0

== Debate: Blind results ==
Week	1st place to evict	2nd place to evict	3rd place to evict	4th place to evict	5th place to evict
1	61%	39%	Cris or Fernando		
1	60%	40%	Cris or Fernando		
1	73%	27%	Laura or Meritxell		
1	69%	31%	Laura or Meritxell		
2	44.0%	33.5%	15.4%	7.1%	
2	42%	38%	11%	9%	
3	72.1%	14.6%	13.3%		
3	67.7%	18.3%	14.0%		
3	47.0%	40.0%	13.0%		
4	52.3%	43.7%	2.8%	1.2%	
4	54.2%	42.0%	2.7%	1.1%	
4	61.7%	38.3%			
5	82.4%	12.4%	5.2%		
5	77%	16%	7%		
6	57.8%	33.1%	9.1%		
6	59.7%	24.8%	15.5%		
7	82.0%	12.5%	5.5%		
7	66.9%	26.7%	6.4%		
8	45.7%	38.7%	10.0%	5.6%	
9	---Not Shown---				
10	59.5%	39.7%	0.8%		
11	56.7%	25.9%	17.4%		
12	47.9%	47.1%	5.0%		
13	46.5%	24.8%	17.5%	7.9%	3.3%
14	39.7%	27.2%	20.4%	12.7%	
15	43.4%	34.1%	22.5%		

== Repechage ==
The first 3 evicted contestants would live in the apartment with 3 others first evicted from previous editions; they were Maite Galdeano (GH 16), Amor Romeira (GH 9) and María José Galera (GH 1). They had the mission of being advised how to improve their way through the competition. The voting public would decide the top ex-housemates to officially return to the Gran Hermano house as official housemates.

After Pablo walked from the ContraClub, this twist was cancelled and the three former housemates had to leave the house. The following evictions would happen as normal.

Finally, the public voting would decide the top ex-housemates to officially return to the Gran Hermano house as official housemates. The repechage was officially announced on Day 50 (October 27, 2016). All the evicted housemates (Pablo, Candelas, Montse and Fernando) were there. They are currently living in the Apartment (Secret Room or House 2).

Ex-housemate	%	Day of elimination
Fernando	55%*	Gala November 3, 2016
Pablo	45%*	Gala November 3, 2016
Candelas	25%	Gala November 3, 2016
Montse	4%	Debate October 30, 2016

- Not officially. Shown moments before closing the voting.

== Twists ==
=== Extra life box ===
On Day 1, when all the housemates entered, Jorge Javier told them each to take one of the 17 boxes that were introduced to them. One of these boxes contained an extra life which allowed an evicted housemate to return to the house immediately. Once an evicted housemate arrived at the studio, the box would be opened and he/she would find out if the extra life is inside. Each housemate had the option to keep their box or give it to another housemate.

Housemate	Box	Given to
Adara	none	Bárbara
Alain	none	Cris
Bárbara	none	Adara
Clara	none	Beatriz
Fernando	none	Cris
Meritxell	none	Laura
Miguel	none	Beatriz
Montse	Extra Life	Beatriz
Noelia	none	
Pol	none	
Rodrigo	none	Beatriz
Beatriz	none	
Candelas	none	
Pablo	none	Cris
Álvaro	none	
Cris	none	
Laura	none	

=== Club GH ===
Week	Housemate(s)
2	Pol
3	Bárbara, Fernando, Pol
4	Beatriz, Fernando, Pol
5	Miguel, Pol, Rodrigo
6	Adara, Bárbara, Beatriz
7	Adara, Beatriz, Miguel
8	Beatriz, Clara, Miguel
9	Closed
10	Alain, Clara, Miguel
11	Beatriz, Miguel, Rodrigo
12	Adara, Beatriz, Miguel
13	Beatriz, Meritxell, Miguel
14	Closed

== Ratings ==
=== "Galas" ===
Show N°	Day	Viewers	Ratings share
1 – Launch	Thursday, September 8	2,557,000	23.9%
2	Thursday, September 15	2,110,000	19.7%
3	Thursday, September 22	2,117,000	19.2%
4	Thursday, September 29	2,038,000	18.6%
5	Thursday, October 6	2,198,000	20.2%
6	Thursday, October 13	2,150,000	19.0%
7	Thursday, October 20	2,227,000	19.3%
8	Thursday, October 27	2,240,000	19.7%
9	Thursday, November 3	2,311,000	21.7%
10	Thursday, November 10	2,197,000	19.9%
11	Thursday, November 17	2,300,000	20.7%
12	Thursday, November 24	2,184,000	18.9%
13	Thursday, December 1	2,137,000	19.0%
14	Thursday, December 8	1,871,000	16.5%
15	Thursday, December 15	2,083,000	18.4%
16 - Final	Thursday, December 22	2,344,000	19.3%

=== "Debates" ===
Show N°	Day	Viewers	Ratings share
1	Sunday, September 11	1,526,000	13.5%
2	Sunday, September 18	1,752,000	14.8%
3	Sunday, September 25	1,681,000	14.2%
4	Sunday, October 2	1,767,000	14.8%
5	Sunday, October 9	1,665,000	14.5%
6	Sunday, October 16	1,612,000	12.8%
7	Sunday, October 23	1,732,000	13.6%
8	Sunday, October 30	1,544,000	13.6%
9	Sunday, November 6	1,765,000	13.8%
10	Sunday, November 13	2,117,000	16.7%
11	Sunday, November 20	1,818,000	14.7%
12	Sunday, November 27	1,792,000	14.3%
13	Sunday, December 4	1,746,000	13.9%
14	Sunday, December 11	1,684,000	13.5%
Final	Sunday, December 25	1,022,000	9,7%

=== "Límite 48 Horas" ===
Show N°	Day	Viewers	Ratings share
1 – Launch	Tuesday, September 13	1,472,000	13.8%
2	Tuesday, September 20	1,483,000	14.1%
3	Tuesday, September 27	1,619,000	15.2%
4	Tuesday, October 4	1,821,000	16.1%
5	Tuesday, October 11	1,597,000	13.4%
6	Tuesday, October 18	1,850,000	16.5%
7	Tuesday, October 25	1,543,000	13.5%
