= Gran Hermano VIP season 4 =

Gran Hermano VIP
- Season 4
- Presented by: Jordi González
- No. of days: 99
- No. of housemates: 18
- Winner: Laura Matamoros
- Runner-up: Carlos Lozano
- No. of episodes: 15

Release
- Original network: Telecinco
- Original release: January 7 – April 14, 2016

Season chronology
- ← Previous; Season 3 Next → Season 5

Gran Hermano VIP 4 was the fourth season of the Spanish reality television Gran Hermano VIP series. The series was launched in January 2016 on Telecinco. Jordi González returned to host the series, and Sandra Barneda was confirmed as the host of the weekly Debate. On the Grand Finale of Gran Hermano 16 it was officially confirmed that GHVIP would start in January.

== Housemates ==
The first official housemates of the season were announced on the finale of Gran Hermano 16, TV personality Rosa Benito and fortune teller Rappel. The rest of the housemates are being confirmed regularly at some of the channel's TV programs. The cast includes relatives of previous contestants, like Rosa Benito, mother of Gran Hermano VIP 2 former contestant Rosario Mohedano and Laura Matamoros, Kiko Matamoros' daughter, also from Season 2. Laura is also set to coexist with her step-brother Javier Tudela.

Housemates	Age	Residence	Profession / Famous for...	Entered	Exited	Status
Laura Matamoros	22	Madrid	Media personality	Day 1	Day 99	Winner
Carlos Lozano	53	Madrid	TV host and model	Day 1	Day 99	Runner-up
Rappel	70	Madrid	Fortune teller	Day 1	Day 92	13th Evicted
Laura Campos	32	Parla	Gran Hermano 12 winner	Day 64	Day 92	12th Evicted
Dani Santos	23	Madrid	Gran Hermano 12+1 housemate	Day 64	Day 85	11th Evicted
Alejandro Nieto	24	Cádiz	Míster Spain 2015	Day 1	Day 83	Walked
Francisco Nicolás	21	Madrid	Law student, alleged fraudster	Day 1	Day 15	1st Evicted
Francisco Nicolás	21	Madrid	Law student, alleged fraudster	Day 50	Day 78	10th Evicted
Raquel Bollo	40	Seville	TV personality	Day 1	Day 71	9th Evicted
Charlotte Caniggia	22	Málaga	Model & socialite	Day 22	Day 64	8th Evicted
Sema García	21	Jerez	TV personality	Day 1	Day 57	7th Evicted
Belén Roca Cela	28	Pontevedra	MyHyV participant	Day 1	Day 56	Walked
Julián Contreras Jr.	29	Madrid	TV personality	Day 1	Day 53	Walked
Rosa Benito	59	Torrejón de Ardoz	TV panelist	Day 1	Day 50	6th Evicted
Liz Emiliano	31	Madrid	Gran Hermano 10 housemate	Day 1	Day 43	5th Evicted
Javier Tudela	23	Madrid	Actor & media personality	Day 1	Day 36	4th Evicted
Lucía Hoyos	40	Seville	Actress & model	Day 1	Day 29	3rd Evicted
Julius Bienert	36	Palma	Chef and TV host	Day 1	Day 22	2nd Evicted
Carmen López	43	Seville	Former Ciudadanos politician	Day 1	Day 9	Walked

== Nominations table ==
	Week 1	Week 2	Week 3	Week 4	Week 5	Week 6	Week 7	Week 8	Week 9	Week 10	Week 11	Week 12	Week 13 Final
Laura M.	Not eligible	Lucía; Carlos; Javier	Lucía; Carlos; Javier	Liz; Javier; Alejandro	Liz; Carlos; Alejandro	Nominated	Alejandro; Rappel; Carlos	Fran; Carlos; Alejandro	Carlos; Alejandro; Fran	Alejandro; Dani; Fran	No; Nominations	No; Nominations	Winner (Day 99)
Carlos	Not eligible	Rosa; Raquel; Sema	Raquel; Laura M. Rosa	Sema; Rappel; Charlotte	Laura M. Rappel; Julián	Not eligible	Raquel; Belén; Charlotte	Rappel; Laura M. Raquel	Fran; Rappel; Laura M.	Fran; Laura C. Dani	No; Nominations	No; Nominations	Runner-up (Day 99)
Rappel	Not eligible	Not eligible	Alejandro; Javier; Carlos	Alejandro; Javier; Charlotte	Not eligible	Not eligible	Carlos; Alejandro; Charlotte	Fran; Carlos; Alejandro	Alejandro; Carlos; Fran	Dani; Carlos; Fran	No; Nominations	No; Nominations	Evicted (Day 92)
Laura C.	Not in House								Exempt	Fran; Carlos; Alejandro	No; Nominations	No; Nominations	Evicted (Day 92)
Dani	Not in House								Exempt	Fran; Alejandro; Carlos	No; Nominations	Evicted (Day 85)	
Alejandro	Julián; Laura M. Javier	Julius; Raquel; Julián	Julián; Rappel; Raquel	Rappel; Charlotte; Julián	Not eligible	Nominated	Laura M. Rappel; Raquel	Laura M. Rappel; Raquel	Raquel; Rappel; Laura M. (3) Raquel	Laura M. Rappel; Dani	No; Nominations	Walked (Day 83)	
Fran	Laura M. Julián; Rosa	Evicted (Day 15)					Exempt	Rappel; Laura M. Raquel	Carlos; Raquel; Rappel	Dani; Laura C. Rappel	Re-evicted (Day 78)		
Raquel	Not eligible	Javier; Carlos; Alejandro	Carlos; Alejandro; Julián	Charlotte; Javier; Alejandro	Not eligible	Not eligible	Carlos; Alejandro; Rappel	Carlos; Alejandro; Fran	Alejandro; Fran; Carlos	Evicted (Day 71)			
Charlotte	Not in House		Exempt	Raquel; Alejandro; Javier	Not eligible	Not eligible	Carlos; Alejandro; Julián	Nominated	Evicted (Day 64)				
Sema	Javier; Fran; Belén	Not eligible	Lucía; Belén; Carlos	Carlos; Belén; Javier	Not eligible	Not eligible	Rappel; Alejandro; Charlotte (3) Belén	Evicted (Day 57)					
Belén	Carmen; Liz; Javier	Not eligible	Liz; Rosa; Laura M.	Liz; Sema; Rosa	Not eligible	Not eligible	Sema	Walked (Day 56)					
Julián	Not eligible	Not eligible	Lucía; Javier; Alejandro	Javier; Alejandro; Liz	Not eligible	Not eligible	Not eligible	Walked (Day 53)					
Rosa	Fran; Alejandro; Javier	Not eligible	Carlos; Belén; Alejandro	Charlotte; Javier; Alejandro	Not eligible	Nominated	Evicted (Day 50)						
Liz	Belén; Lucía; Julius	Not eligible	Belén; Julián; Sema	Belén; Laura M. Julián	Not eligible	Evicted (Day 43)							
Javier	Not eligible	Sema; Julius; Julián	Julián; Sema; Raquel	Charlotte; Rappel; Rosa	Evicted (Day 36)								
Lucía	Carmen; Laura M. Liz	Not eligible	Julián; Laura M. Sema	Evicted (Day 29)									
Julius	Not eligible	Lucía; Javier; Alejandro	Evicted (Day 22)										
Carmen	Not eligible	Walked (Day 9)											
Nominations notes	1, 2	3	4, 5	5	6	7	5, 8	5, 9, 10	5, 11, 12	5, 13	14		None
Nominated for eviction	~~Carmen~~; Fran; Julián; Laura M.	Javier; Julius; Lucía	Carlos; Julián; Lucía	Alejandro; Charlotte; Javier	Carlos; Laura M. Liz; Rappel	Alejandro; Laura M. Rosa	Alejandro; Carlos; Sema	Carlos; Charlotte; Laura M. Rappel	Alejandro; Carlos; Raquel	Alejandro; Carlos; Fran	All housemates		Carlos; Laura M.
Walked	Carmen	none					Julián; Belén	none			Alejandro	none	
Evicted	Fran; 62.2% to evict (out of 2)	Julius; 39.7% to evict	Lucía; 66.2% to evict (out of 2)	Javier; 60.3% to evict	Liz; 41.35% to evict	Rosa; 54.38% to evict (out of 2)	Sema; 50.8% to evict	Charlotte; 45.1% to evict	Raquel; 51.6% to evict	Fran; 55.4% to evict	Dani; 0.7% to save	Laura C. 1.0% to save	Carlos; 42.1% to win
Evicted	Fran; 62.2% to evict (out of 2)	Julius; 39.7% to evict	Lucía; 66.2% to evict (out of 2)	Javier; 60.3% to evict	Liz; 41.35% to evict	Rosa; 54.38% to evict (out of 2)	Sema; 50.8% to evict	Charlotte; 45.1% to evict	Raquel; 51.6% to evict	Fran; 55.4% to evict	Dani; 0.7% to save	Rappel; 1.1% to save	Laura M. 57.9% to win

=== Notes ===
This housemate was directly nominated for eviction prior to the regular nominations process.
This housemate was granted immunity from nominations.
This housemate won the right to nominate automatically a housemate.

- ^Note 1 : Because of the weekly task, the loser team, the Faraophs, was not able to nominate.
- ^Note 2 : Alejandro won the power of salvation and he saved Javier which meant that Fran and Julián were nominated as well.
- ^Note 3 : Because of the weekly task, the loser team, the Red Door, was not able to nominate.
- ^Note 4 : Charlotte was exempt from nominations as she was a new housemate.
- ^Note 5 : This week both teams passed the weekly task and for this reason all contestants were able to nominate.
- ^Note 6 : This week the privileged team was able to nominate.
- ^Note 7 : Gran Hermano proposed to the housemates to nominate themselves or let the public nominate instead. The housemates let the public nominate.
- ^Note 8 : Because of the weekly task, Belén won the right to nominate automatically a housemate, Julián won the right to not nominate and Sema won the right to give three extra points in the nominations.
- ^Note 9 : Charlotte was automatically nominated by Gran Hermano due to inappropriate behavior towards Carlos.
- ^Note 10 : The public gave the right to Carlos, Fran and Laura M. to save a nominated housemate. They saved Fran.
- ^Note 11 : In this round each housemate could have the chance to win three extra points in the nominations. Alejandro was the only one to win them.
- ^Note 12 : Dani and Laura C. were exempt from nominations as they were new housemates.
- ^Note 13 : Dani and Rappel won the power of salvation and they saved Dani which meant that Carlos was nominated as well.
- ^Note 14 : Lines were opened to vote for the winner. The housemate with fewest votes would be evicted.

== Nominations total received ==
	Week 2	Week 3	Week 4	Week 5	Week 6	Week 7	Week 8	Week 9	Week 10	Week 11	Week 12	Week 13	Final	Total
Laura M.	7	0	5	2	3	-	3	7	2	3	–	–	winner	32
Carlos	0	4	10	3	2	-	10	7	9	5	–	–	Runner-Up	50
Rappel	0	0	2	7	2	-	8	8	5	3	–	–	Evicted	35
Laura C.	Not in House								-	4	–	–	Evicted	4
Dani	Not in House								-	10	–	Evicted		10
Alejandro	2	2	7	10	1	-	11	4	8	6	–	Walked		51
Fran	5	Evicted					-	7	7	11	Re-Evicted			30
Raquel	0	4	5	3	0	-	4	3	8	Evicted				27
Charlotte	Not in House		-	13	0	-	3	-	Evicted					16
Sema	0	4	4	5	0	-	-	Evicted						13
Belén	4	0	7	5	0	-	5	Walked						21
Julián	5	2	12	2	1	-	1	Walked						23
Rosa	1	3	3	2	0	-	Evicted							9
Liz	3	0	3	7	3	Evicted								16
Javier	6	6	5	13	Evicted									30
Lucía	2	6	9	Evicted										17
Julius	1	5	Evicted											6
Carmen	6	Walked												6

== Debate: Blind results ==
Week	1st place to evict	2nd place to evict	3rd place to evict	4th place to evict	5th place to evict	6th place to evict
2	50,5%	36,1%	13,4%			
2	55,7%	29,9%	14,4%			
2	55,3%	30,5%	14,2%			
3	37,1%	35,4%	27,5%			
3	42,1%	34,9%	23%			
3	39,9%	38,2%	21,9%			
4	39,0%	38,5%	22,5%			
4	41,9%	34,7%	23,4%			
4	48,4%	27,9%	23,7%			
5	54,9%	39,1%	6,0%			
5	48,5%	44,4%	7,1%			
5	56,3%	36,4%	7,3%			
6	48,2%	41,1%	7,1%	3,6%		
6	50,2%	37,8%	8,1%	3,9%		
6	48,7%	34,3%	12,9%	4,1%		
7	44,2%	43,2%	12,6%			
7	46,1%	42,1%	11,8%			
7	48,0%	40,7%	11,3%			
8	47,8%	40,2%	12,0%			
8	57,1%	36,9%	6,0%			
8	56,5%	38,6%	4,9%			
9	39,4%	37,6%	11,8%	11,2%		
9	38,6%	37,1%	12,6%	11,7%		
9	40,0%	36,7%	12,1%	11,2%		
9	44,9%	33,7%	11,3%	10,1%		
10	61,0%	25,9%	13,1%			
10	59,5%	28,1%	12,4%			
10	57,2%	32,1%	10,7%			
11	44,0%	43,4%	11,6%			
11	47,1%	36,3%	16,6%			
11	57,4%	26,3%	16,3%			
11	49,5%	30,3%	16,8%	1,3%	1,1%	1,0%
11	46,0%	33,5%	18,0%	1,0%	0,9%	0,6%
11	47,0%	34,8%	15,8%	1,0%	0,8%	0,6%
12	54,7%	43,7%	0,9%	0,7%		
13	55,8%	44,2%				
13	56,6%	43,4%				
13	58,5%	41,5%				

== Repechage ==
The public voting will decide the top ex-housemates to officially return to the Gran Hermano VIP house as official housemates.

The repechage was officially announced on Day (February 21, 2016). All the evicted housemates (Fran, Julius, Lucía, Javier and Liz) are there. All of them are up for returning to the house.

Ex-housemate	%	Elimination's Day
Fran	60,1%	Gala. February 25, 2016
Javier	39,9%	Gala. February 25, 2016
Julius	22,4%	Limite: 48h. February 23, 2016
Lucía	3%	Debate. February 21, 2016
Liz	Quit	Debate. February 21, 2016

== Replacements ==
The program revealed 4 possible candidates to join the VIP house to replace Julián and Belén, only 2 of them succeed in doing and the audience will vote for their favorite to enter the VIP house. The candidates are: Laura Campos (Gran Hermano 12 winner), Dani Santos (Gran Hermano 12+1 housemate), Miguel Frigenti (journalist) and Samira Salomé (MYHYV participant).

Candidates	%	Elimination's Day
Dani Santos	35,3%	Gala. March 10, 2016
Laura Campos	34,3% / 50,5%	Gala. March 10, 2016
Samira Salomé	30,2% / 49,5%	Gala. March 10, 2016
Miguel Frigenti	18,4%	Limite: 48h. March 8, 2016

== Nomination twists ==
The weekly budget challenge directly affects nominations this season. Each week, the housemates will be divided in two different teams, each with his own different challenge. In orden to be able to nominate this week, the team must pass his challenge. If no one of the teams pass the challenge, both team would nominate.

=== Week 1: Pharaophs and slaves ===
On the premiere of Gran Hermano VIP 4, the housemates were divided into two teams whose main captains were chosen by the winner of the previous season Belén Esteban, Julius' team and Belén's team. The audience decided which team would be Pharaophs and which team would be slaves. On the Weekly Debate, the public decided that Javier should become a Pharaoph and he had the power to send one member of the Pharaophs team to the slaves team, he chose Alejandro.

The Pharaophs were unable to finish the challenge so they can't nominate the first week.

- Teams

Pharaophs	Slaves
Julius	Belén
Carmen	Lucía
Carlos	Sema
Julián	Fran
Alejandro	Javier
Raquel	Liz
Laura	Rosa
Rappel	
Losers	Winners

The one with the fewest votes of the public have to nominate first. The order of nominations was: Lucía, Belén, Sema, Liz, Alejandro, Rosa and Fran.

=== Week 2: Time & Space ===
During the second gala, one by one the housemates should pick a red door or a black door. If they pick the red door, they will spend the week doing luxurious and funny activities. If they choose the black door, they will be doing nasty and boring activities. Carmen, who pick the red door, quit the game on Day 8. On the Debate, because of a dispute between members of the red door, Carlos and Lucia changed teams by order of the teams.

Red Door	Black Door
Belén	Alejandro
Carlos	Lucía
Liz	Fran
Julián	Javier
Rappel	Julius
Rosa	Laura
Sema	Raquel
Losers	Winners

The one with the fewest votes of the public have to nominate first. The order of nominations was: Julius, Carlos, Raquel, Alejandro, Javier and Laura.

=== Week 3: Bees & Drones ===
This week the people had to choose between the red door and black. Drones (black door) had to collect pollen heavy activities, several participants injured. Bees (Red Door) had to take care of the baby bees. In Sunday's debate Bees Javier decided to leave the other team for his knee injury and Drones Liz decided to leave.

Drones	Bees
Javier	Belén
Sema	Liz
Julián	Rosa
Lucía	Rappel
Carlos	
Alejandro	
Raquel	
Laura	
Julius	
Winners	Winners

=== Week 4: Years 70's ===
This week the inhabitants of the house had to agree as would be the equipment, Alejandro, Bethlehem, Carlos, Charlotte, Javier, Lucia and Sema chose the Red Gate where they had to develop two choreographies and the public decide if testing or exceed not through the App Big Brother. The rest of the participants had to pedal 1,000 kilometers a caravan and make 2 secret missions that would help them build km. In Sunday's debate audience he decided that Rosa became part of the Artists and she chose to join the fans to Alexander.

Artists	Fans
Alejandro	Julián
Belén	Laura
Carlos	Liz
Charlotte	Rappel
Javier	Raquel
Lucía	Rosa
Sema	
Winners	Winners

=== Week 5: Privilege and Fear ===
On the 29th the public chose 3 contestants through the application to the members of the red door that would be i favor, Laura (21%), Javier (18%) and Carlos (16%) were found to be top rated. The rest of the contestants had to endure phobias that privileged chose. The 09 day of February were told participants that only privileged in may nominate as only they passed the test.

Privilege	Fear
Laura	Sema
Javier	Charlotte
Carlos	Julián
	Rappel
	Rosa
	Raquel
	Alejandro
	Liz
	Belén
Winners	Losers

=== Week 6: Great Spa ===
Contestants become the directors and employees of the most luxurious hotel catering, health and wellness. Thus, they must be available to its customers and their tips depend on that stand the test.

Customers will have their own suite, eat alone and may ask whatever they want to whomever they want. Of course, among them there will be an employee-client relationship.

After each service will give customers €10, €5 or €0 or complain directly (which would lose 5 € of the total pot), depending on the quality of service. It is a personal tip that everyone will keep until the end of the test. If we all manage to raise €1000 will exceed the test.

The hotel will have a minimum service: a cook, a maid, a person receiving the waiter and a manager. The others will be alert because customers can claim them for any service.

Managers are always available and enforce hours hotel service. The cleaning staff will collect and clean the rooms and manage the laundry. The reception team will serve customers 24 hours a day. Cooks are responsible for thinking and preparing menus for lunch and dinner with two options first and second. The bartender will prepare breakfast, take note of the requests for lunch and dinner and immediately attend to any customers request day or night. The head of the SPA will manage massages, pedicures and manicures.

The functions have been distributed as follows:

Employee	Function	Customers	Days
Belén	Director	Kiko Matamoros	36-39
Rappel	Director	Víctor Sandoval	36-39
Sema	Goalie	Aguasantas Vilches	36-39
Carlos	Chef	Belén Esteban	39-41
~~Javier~~	~~Chef~~	Ylenia Padilla	39-41
Liz	~~Service~~, Chef	Rafa Martín	39-41
Laura	Service		
Rosa	Service		
Julián	Receptionist		
Raquel	Receptionist		
Charlotte	SPA		
Alejandro	Buttons		
Winner

=== Week 7: APPs ===
Cyclists	APPs
Alejandro	Raquel
Laura	Carlos
Rosa	Rappel
Sema	Belén
Julián	Charlotte
Winners	Winners

=== Week 8: Videoclips ===
The housemates have to make 2 videoclips in two groups, the songs are:

- Joey Montana (Picky)
- Morat (Cómo te atreves)

Picky	Cómo te atreves
Carlos	Raquel
Laura	Alejandro
Fran	Rappel
Sema	~~Belén~~
Charlotte	~~Julián~~
Winners	Winners

=== Week 9: Don Quijote ===
Theater	Walker
Charlotte	Carlos
Laura	Alejandro
Fran	Rappel
Raquel	
Winners	Winners

== Ratings ==
=== "Galas" ===
- On Thursdays.

Show N°	Day	Viewers	Ratings share
1 - Launch	Thursday, January 7	3.136.000	23,4%
2	Thursday, January 14	3.115.000	25,4%
3	Thursday, January 21	3.051.000	24,8%
4	Thursday, January 28	2.788.000	23,1%
5	Thursday, February 4	2.687.000	22,3%
6	Thursday, February 11	3.244.000	25,7%
7	Thursday, February 18	2.877.000	24,0%
8	Thursday, February 25	3.140.000	24,5%
9	Thursday, March 3	3.141.000	24,6%
10	Thursday, March 10	2.884.000	23,3%
11	Thursday, March 17	2.839.000	23,0%
12	Thursday, March 24	2.024.000	18,9%
13	Thursday, March 31	2.840.000	22,5%
14	Thursday, April 7	2.719.000	21,0%
15 - Final	Thursday, April 14	3.622.000	27,0%

=== "Debates" ===
Show N°	Day	Viewers	Ratings share
1	Sunday, January 10	2.673.000	18,8%
2	Sunday, January 17	2.690.000	20,3%
3	Sunday, January 24	2.531.000	19,2%
4	Sunday, January 31	2.236.000	17,4%
5	Sunday, February 7	2.207.000	16,0%
6	Sunday, February 14	2.384.000	17,6%
7	Sunday, February 21	2.262.000	17,3%
8	Sunday, February 28	2.551.000	19,0%
9	Sunday, March 6	2.214.000	17,0%
10	Sunday, March 13	2.151.000	17,1%
11	Sunday, March 20	2.386.000	13,6%
12	Sunday, March 27	2.325.000	17,7%
13	Sunday, April 3	2.550.000	13,6%
14	Sunday, April 10	2.854.000	15,3%
15	Sunday, April 17	1.792.000	16,0%

=== "Limit: 48 Horas" ===
Show N°	Day	Viewers	Ratings share
1	Tuesday, January 12	2.363.000	18,6%
2	Tuesday, January 19	2.418.000	19,8%
3	Tuesday, January 26	2.263.000	18,4%
4	Tuesday, February 2	2.039.000	16,6%
5	Tuesday, February 9	2.302.000	18,0%
6	Tuesday, February 16	2.405.000	18,8%
7	Tuesday, February 23	2.317.000	18,6%
8	Tuesday, March 1	2.608.000	22,2%
9	Tuesday, March 8	2.296.000	19,0%
10	Tuesday, March 15	1.979.000	9,8%
11	Tuesday, March 22	2.265.000	19,7%
12	Tuesday, March 29	2.474.000	19,1%
13	Tuesday, April 5	2.531.000	11,2%

== See also ==
- Main article about the show
