= Gran Hermano (Spanish TV series) season 12 =

Gran Hermano
- Season 12
- Presented by: Mercedes Milá
- No. of days: 145
- No. of housemates: 22
- Winner: Laura Campos
- Runner-up: Yago Hermida
- No. of episodes: 22 (Galas)

Release
- Original network: Telecinco
- Original release: 17 October 2010 – 10 March 2011

Season chronology
- ← Previous; Season 11 Next → Season 13

Gran Hermano 12 (English: "Big Brother 11") launched on 17 October 2010 and ended on 10 March 2011, making it the longest season of Gran Hermano to date, just lasting a day longer than the previous series. It took place after Gran Hermano: El Reencuentro. This is the twelfth Spanish edition of the reality franchise Big Brother. The main show which consists of nominations and evictions is known as the Gala and El Debate, a weekly spin-off show, where recently evicted housemates will return. The tag line for this edition is "La Cuarta Dimensión" (The fourth dimension). The grand prize this season was €300,000.

In the 2015 season Gran Hermano VIP 3, Chari returned to the house.

In the 2016 season Gran Hermano VIP 4, Laura returned to the house.

== Housemates ==
Casting for potential Gran Hermano 12 housemates started during the last weeks of Gran Hermano 11. Casting calls were held during the summer of 2010 in cities all over Spain. The casting via phone line closed in August 2010 and on 1 October 2010 producers revealed that 40 people were already in the final phase of the casting process.

Twenty housemates entered the Gran Hermano house. They were split in two different houses, White house (House 1) and Color house (House 2). 9 women entered the color house and 9 men entered the white house. Rubén and Chari were ex, she entered the white house and Rubén entered the color house. All housemates had to get know each other by blind dates and after that chose their favourites or less favourites. On Day 5, women from color house chose their 4 favorite men from white house. Men from white house chose their 4 less favourite women from color house. Chari and Rubén's secret were discovered so they had to change house. On Day 47, the house was unified. On Day 82, five ex-housemates, Chari, Mireia, Oscar, Ruben, and Yago, returned to the Color House after an online public vote; a second round of online public voting on Day 89 decided for Ruben and Yago to officially return to the Gran Hermano house as official housemates; the other three housemates were re-evicted.

Housemates	Age	Residence	Occupation	Entered	Exited	Status
Laura Campos	27	Madrid	Industrial operator	Day 1	Day 145	Winner
Yago Hermida	33	Pontevedra	Modelo	Day 1 Day 82	Day 68; Day 145	9th Evicted
Yago Hermida	33	Pontevedra	Modelo	Day 1 Day 82	Day 68; Day 145	Runner-up
Marcelo Ciriaco	20	Málaga	History student	Day 1	Day 145	3rd Place
Marta López	25	A Coruña	Saleswoman	Day 1	Day 138	19th Evicted
Dámaso Angulo	18	Toledo	Mortician, student and singer	Day 1	Day 131	18th Evicted
Lydia Navarro	24	Palma de Mallorca	Secretary	Day 1	Day 124	17th Evicted
Rubén Estévez	25	Cádiz	Business student	Day 1 Day 82	Day 61; Day 117	8th Evicted
Rubén Estévez	25	Cádiz	Business student	Day 1 Day 82	Day 61; Day 117	16th Evicted
Terry Willis	22	Tenerife	Student	Day 1	Day 110	15th Evicted
Cathaysa Mogollón	29	Madrid	Engineer	Day 1	Day 103	14th Evicted
Patricia Hurtado	25	Cádiz	Unemployee	Day 1	Day 96	13th Evicted
Jhota García	22	Madrid	Singer	Day 1	Day 89	12th Evicted
Anup Menda	34	Las Palmas	Businessman	Day 1	Day 82	11th Evicted
Rosario Lojo "Chari"	27	Cádiz	Multidisciplinary monitor	Day 1 Day 82	Day 75; Day 89	10th Evicted
Arturo García	20	Biscay	Book seller	Day 33	Day 54	7th Evicted
Pepa Beltrán	51	Cádiz	Businesswoman	Day 33	Day 47	6th Evicted
Joaquín Sanz	42	Huelva	Unemployed	Day 1	Day 40	5th Evicted
Eduardo Palomino	31	Madrid	Computer programmer	Day 1	Day 33	4th Evicted
Julia Valverde	31	Palma de Mallorca	Peddler	Day 1	Day 26	3rd Evicted
Mireia Carillo	32	Barcelona	Advertising manager	Day 1 Day 82	Day 19; Day 89	2nd Evicted
Flor Luján	26	Madrid	Waitress	Day 1	Day 19	Ejected
Julio Granado "Feroz"	30	Alicante	Boxer	Day 1	Day 19	Ejected
Óscar Casado	30	Granada	Businessman	Day 1 Day 82	Day 12; Day 89	1st Evicted

=== Anup ===
Anup Naraim is a male housemate from Bombay, India. He was the first Indian in Big Brother Spain. He entered on Day 1 into the white house. He loves to clean the house. He was considered by his peers as a traitor, as he was in one group to another to avoid being nominated. He has had disputes with Julia, Jhota, Terry, and Laura. After facing the public vote five times, he was finally evicted on Day 82.

=== Arturo ===
Arturo García is a male housemate from who entered on Day 33 as replacement for Julio and he entered the color house in a decision along with Pepa. He made friends with Yago and Marta a few days. His goal was to go mad at smokers, preventing them from smoking. Terry was his main enemy. He also has had disputes with Laura and Patricia. He was the seventh housemate to be evicted from Gran Hermano 12 with 82.1% of the public vote in his first nomination.

=== Cathaysa ===
Cathaysa Mogollon is a female housemate from Venezuela who entered on Day 1 into the color house. Her housemates call her 'Catha'. She hasn't had a special friendship with anyone. Sometimes she has been giving good advice to her housemates. She has been nominated for eviction four times and finally she was evicted in a very close eviction with Terry on Day 103.

=== Chari ===
Chari Lojo is a female housemate from who entered on Day 1 into the white house. She is Rubén's girlfriend. On Day 1, Chari and Rubén were told to keep their relationship as a secret but on Day 5 their secret was discovered so they were punished to be separated into different houses until further notice; she chose the color house to live that week. She was evicted on Day 75 and has ended her relationship with Ruben. On Day 82 she re-entered in House 2 with Mireia, Óscar, Rubén, and Yago, voted by the online public vote. On Day 89, she was re-evicted after losing a second round of the online public vote to become an official housemate again.

=== Dámaso ===
Dámaso Angulo is a male housemate from who entered on Day 1 into the white house. He is the youngest contestant of Gran Hermano, along with GH9's Amor Romeira. He revealed in the house that he is gay. In the house, he started a radical look change. He survived 5 nominations but in his sixth nomination he was evicted with 74% against Laura.

=== Eduardo ===
Eduardo Palomino is a male housemate who entered on Day 1 into the white house becoming the first hearing impaired person ever in Gran Hermano. He developed a strong friendship with Julia. He was evicted on Day 33 in a very close eviction with Cathaysa.

=== Flor ===
Florencia Luján is a female housemate from Argentina who entered on Day 1 into the color house. She was ejected on Day 19 as she planned with Julio how to obtain more money outside the house and feigning a false romance.

=== Jhota ===
Jose Ramón García known as Jhota is a male housemate who entered on Day 1 into the white house. He always wear a colour clothes. He developed a great friendship with Terry, Lydia and Patricia, which he was calling "The Jhota's girls ". He was considered to be the leader of his group. He was very a friend of Laura and Marcelo until they discussed strongly and broke his friendship. He was the twelfth housemate to be evicted from Gran Hermano house.

=== Joaquín ===
Joaquín Sanz is a male housemate who entered on Day 1 into the white house. He and Marta were couple in the house. On Day 40, he became the fifth person to be evicted from the house in a close eviction with Laura.

=== Julia ===
Julia Valverde is a gypsy female housemate who entered on Day 1 into the color house becoming the second gypsy person ever in Gran Hermano. She said before entering she had never had a toilet. She hated to Patricia and Anup. She didn't stop yelling. She was evicted with 62% of public votes on Day 26. She was evicted over Patricia.

=== Julio 'El Feroz' ===
Julio Granado known as 'El Feroz' is a male housemate who entered on Day 1 into the white house. He was ejected on Day 19 as he planned with Flor how to obtain more money outside the house and making a false romance.

=== Laura ===
Laura Campos is a female housemate who entered on Day 1 into the color house. She broke up with her real life boyfriend Samuel in the house to start a relationship with Marcelo. She was a contender to win the show all the time. On Round 13 she was automatically nominated by Big Brother as she had a big argument with Terry. She also had discussions with Jhota. She became the winner of Gran Hermano 12 with 63.1% of the public votes meaning that she is the fifth woman to win Gran Hermano.

=== Lydia ===
Lydia Navarro is a female housemate who entered on Day 1 into the color house. Lydia was chosen by Gran Hermano to visit the Big Brother Israel house on 31 December 2010 as part of a housemate exchange; after 5 days, she returned to Spain. She's got a daughter names Celia. She was considered by all of her housemates as a good person. He developed a strong friendship with Dámaso and Yago, and was part of "The Jhota's girls". She was considered a contender to win. She was evicted two weeks before the final with 72,7%.

=== Marcelo ===
Marcelo Ciriaco is a male housemate who entered on Day 1 into the white house. He has developed a romance with Laura. They were all the program having arguments. He also had discussions with Terry, Jhota and Patricia. He was a goof friend of Rubén until he (Rubén) considered that Marcelo had cheated him saying that Chari had been bad in his absence. On Day 62, he temporarily left the house as part of a humanitarian trip set by Gran Hermano.

=== Marta ===
Marta López is a female housemate who entered on Day 1 into the color house. She had an affair with Joaquín but he didn't anything with her. She has the record for Gran Hermano of being nominated for ten times, she survived 9 times. She finally was the last person to be evicted on Day 138 with 66,1% She was a contender to win, but When the contest advanced she started losing energy and going out. She had problems with Jhota and Terry, and she was very a friend of Mireia, Rubén, Chari and Yago. Nonetheless, she seemed to feel very alone most of the time.

=== Mireia ===
Mireia Carrillo is a female housemate who entered on Day 1 into the color house. Her idol is Madonna. She has made a video clip in 2008 named "Hey Boy, Hey Girl", and her nickname is MIVIC. She was good friend of Marta. She became the second person to be evicted by the public vote on Day 19. She returned to the house on Day 82 for an opportunity to become an official housemate again; she was re-evicted the following week after losing the second round of voting. She never set a foot on the white house.

=== Óscar ===
Óscar Casado is a male housemate who entered on Day 1 into the white house. On Day 12 he was the first housemate to be evicted. He was best friend of Yago and Julio. He returned to the house on Day 82 for an opportunity to become an official housemate again.

=== Patricia ===
Patricia Hurtado is a female housemate who entered on Day 1 into the color house. Her biggest enemy in the house is Julia. The program gave her a rabbit called Bonita. She was always singing and she demonstrated to be like a child. She was friend of Terry and Jhota, and was always with they. She was considered a contender to win but was evicted on Day 96.

=== Pepa ===
Pepa Beltrán is a female housemate who entered on Day 33 as replacement for Flor. She entered into the color house in a decision along with Arturo. She considered herself a goof strategy, but on Day 47, she was the sixth person to be evicted from Gran Hermano house with 76.4% of public votes. She only rest 14 days in the house.

=== Rubén ===
Rubén Estévez is a male housemate who entered on Day 1 into the color house. He is Chari's boyfriend. On Day 1, Chari and Rubén were told to keep their relationship as a secret but on Day 5 their secret was discovered so they were punished to be separated until further notice; he chose the white house to live that week. He was evicted on Day 61 with 60.6% of the public vote, and during his eviction interview, he ended his relationship with Chari. He returned to the house on Day 82 for an opportunity to become an official housemate again. Rubén was evicted on Day 117 again with 38,7% of the votes.

=== Terry ===
Terry Willis Pérez is a female housemate who entered on Day 1 into the color house. She lost 46 kilos before enter in Gran Hermano. On Day 5 she was elected by men and she remained at the color house. On Round 13 she was automatically nominated because of a big argument with Laura. She was friend of Patricia, and it seemed that she liked Jhota. She had a lot of arguments into the house until she was evicted on Day 110 with 62,19% of public votes.

=== Yago ===
Yago Hermida is a male housemate who entered on Day 1 into the white house. He was evicted on Day 68 with 51.5% of the vote. He returned to the house on Day 82 for an opportunity to become an official housemate again. On Day 117 as he was the person with least nomination votes he was able to find the time capsule which meant that he was the first finalist of Gran Hermano 12 and for this reason he was immune for the last two rounds.

== Housemate Exchange & Big Brother Song Contest ==
Shortly after Christmas 2010, it was confirmed by the Big Brother Israel website that a housemate exchange will take place with the Gran Hermano Spain house. On 29 December, the BB Israel hosts confirmed that housemate Yaakov "Jackie" Menahem will travel to Spain in exchange with Lydia Navarro. Jackie arrived to the GH house on 30 December (Day 75) and Lydia left on New Year's Day (Day 77). Both housemates spent 5 days in each houses.

It was also confirmed that a global Big Brother Song Contest will take place with the two countries along with Big Brother editions in Argentina, Greece, and Italy as jurors. The housemates involved in the exchange will assist their new housemates in two songs which were performed in the Eurovision Song Contest. Big Brother Israel performed their song on 5 January 2011 and Gran Hermano Spain performed the follow day. It was announced that the Gran Hermano Spain housemates won the contest earning top scores from all three jurors.

== Nominations ==
	Week 1	Week 2	Week 3	Week 4	Week 5	Week 6	Week 7	Week 8	Week 9	Week 10	Week 11	Week 12	Week 13	Week 14	Week 15	Week 16	Week 17	Week 18	Week 19	Week 20 Final		Nominations received
Laura	Julio	Eduardo; Lydia	Eduardo; Dámaso	Eduardo; Dámaso; Anup	Marcelo; Anup; Rubén	Anup; Cathaysa	Cathaysa; Dámaso	Marta; Rubén; Jhota	Chari; Yago; Anup	Marcelo; Terry; Lydia	Cathaysa; Dámaso; Lydia	Jhota; Patricia; Cathaysa	Nominated	Cathaysa; Terry; Dámaso	3:Yago	Dámaso; Lydia; Yago	Lydia; Dámaso; Yago	Marcelo, Marta	Marta	Winner (Day 145)		38
Yago	Marta	Not; Eligible	Terry; Jhota; Patricia	Patricia; Terry	Terry; Chari	Terry; Patricia; Rubén	Marta; Patricia; Chari	Jhota; Terry; Marcelo	Anup; Patricia; Dámaso	Evicted (Day 68)		In House 2	Exempt	Dámaso; Terry; Cathaysa	1:Laura	Rubén; Laura; Dámaso	Laura; Dámaso; Lydia	Marta, Marcelo	Laura	Runner-Up (Day 145)		41
Marcelo	Lydia	Lydia; Patricia	Anup; Lydia	Laura; Lydia; Anup	Laura; Lydia; Dámaso	Lydia; Dámaso	Lydia; Dámaso	Laura; Terry; Lydia	Chari; Yago; Anup	Laura; Terry; Jhota	Cathaysa; Dámaso; Patricia	Jhota; Patricia; Dámaso	Cathaysa; Patricia; Lydia	Cathaysa; Terry; Dámaso	4:Terry	Rubén; Dámaso; Lydia	Marta; Lydia; Dámaso	Laura, Dámaso	Marta	Third Place (Day 145)		61
Marta	Óscar	Julio; Yago; Flor	Patricia; Jhota; Chari	Patricia; Terry	Terry; Jhota	Terry; Patricia; Pepa	Arturo; Patricia; Rubén	Jhota; Terry; Marcelo	Terry; Jhota; Marcelo	Chari; Laura; Lydia	Terry; Jhota; Marcelo	Jhota; Patricia; Terry	Patricia; Cathaysa; Lydia	Cathaysa; Terry; Dámaso	1:Lydia	Lydia; Dámaso; Marcelo	Marcelo; Dámaso; Lydia	Laura, Dámaso	Marcelo	Evicted (Day 138)		81
Dámaso	Lydia	Laura; Lydia	Anup; Rubén	Anup; Lydia; Laura	Cathaysa; Lydia; Rubén	Jhota; Lydia	Laura; Jhota	Marta; Rubén; Jhota	Anup; Yago; Chari	Cathaysa; Lydia; Laura	Anup; Marcelo; Patricia	Patricia; Jhota; Terry	Patricia; Marcelo; Lydia	Marcelo; Marta; Laura	1:Yago	Marcelo; Rubén; Laura	Laura; Marcelo; Marta	Marta, Marcelo	Evicted (Day 131)			63
Lydia	Julio	Dámaso; Marcelo	Julia; Eduardo	Eduardo; Dámaso; Marcelo	Cathaysa; Marcelo; Rubén	Cathaysa; Marcelo	Dámaso; Marcelo	Marta; Rubén; Jhota	Anup; Yago; Chari	Jhota; Terry; Marcelo	Marta; Anup; Marcelo	Marta; Laura; Marcelo	Marcelo; Marta; Dámaso	Laura; Marta; Marcelo	2:Marcelo	Marcelo; Rubén; Laura	Laura; Marcelo; Marta	Evicted (Day 124)				45
Rubén	Julio	Marcelo; Patricia	Julia; Dámaso	Eduardo; Lydia; Dámaso	Lydia; Dámaso; Laura	Pepa; Patricia; Terry	Arturo; Marta; Patricia	Jhota; Terry; Cathaysa	Evicted (Day 61)			In House 2	Exempt	Dámaso; Terry; Cathaysa	1:Yago; 1:Marcelo; 1:Lydia	Lydia; Dámaso; Laura	Re-evicted (Day 117)					34
Terry	Yago	Joaquín; Mireia; Flor	Patricia; Joaquín; Cathaysa	Cathaysa; Joaquín	Joaquín; Marta	Yago; Arturo; Marta	Dámaso; Anup	Rubén; Marta; Jhota	Anup; Yago; Chari	Jhota; Laura; Patricia	Marta; Anup; Marcelo	Marta; Dámaso; Lydia	Nominated	Marcelo; Marta; Laura	4:Marcelo; 1:Laura	Evicted (Day 110)						44
Cathaysa	Óscar	Jhota; Joaquín; Marta	Patricia; Jhota; Joaquín	Terry; Chari	Dámaso; Lydia; Marcelo	Lydia; Dámaso	Laura; Anup	Marta; Rubén; Jhota	Chari; Yago; Anup	Terry; Dámaso; Marcelo	Laura; Marcelo; Marta	Laura; Marta; Dámaso	Marcelo; Marta; Dámaso	Laura; Marta; Marcelo	Evicted (Day 103)							45
Patricia	Julio	Julia; Marcelo	Joaquín; Yago; Marta	Cathaysa; Joaquín	Joaquín; Marta	Yago; Pepa; Arturo	Arturo; Yago; Marta	Rubén; Marta; Jhota	Chari; Yago; Anup	Terry; Jhota; Laura	Anup; Marta; Marcelo	Marta; Laura; Dámaso	Marcelo; Marta; Dámaso	Evicted (Day 96)								60
Jhota	Óscar	Mireia; Cathaysa; Flor	Cathaysa; Marta; Patricia	Marta; Cathaysa	Joaquín; Marta	Cathaysa; Anup	Dámaso; Anup	Rubén; Marta; Anup	Anup; Yago; Chari	Terry; Patricia; Laura	Anup; Marta; Marcelo	Marta; Laura; Dámaso	Evicted (Day 89)									43
Anup	Lydia	Eduardo; Marcelo	Julia; Eduardo	Dámaso; Eduardo; Marcelo	Laura; Dámaso; Lydia	Laura; Jhota	Jhota; Dámaso	Yago; Rubén; Chari	Terry; Jhota; Marcelo	Marcelo; Laura; Lydia	Patricia; Jhota; Marcelo	Evicted (Day 82)										52
Chari	Flor	Joaquín; Mireia; Cathaysa	Marta; Cathaysa; Joaquín	Cathaysa; Joaquín	Joaquín; Marta	Pepa; Yago; Arturo	Arturo; Yago; Patricia	Terry; Jhota; Marcelo	Terry; Jhota; Marcelo	Marta; Lydia; Dámaso	Evicted (Day 75)	In House 2	Re-evicted (Day 89)									20
Arturo	Not in House				Exempt	Terry; Patricia; Rubén	Marta; Patricia; Rubén	Evicted (Day 54)														16
Pepa	Not in House				Exempt	Terry; Patricia; Rubén	Evicted (Day 47)															9
Joaquín	Yago	Flor; Julio; Yago	Patricia; Yago; Terry	Patricia; Terry	Terry; Chari	Evicted (Day 40)																27
Eduardo	Lydia	Dámaso; Patricia	Anup; Lydia	Laura; Anup; Lydia	Evicted (Day 33)																	16
Julia	Julio	Anup; Patricia	Lydia; Anup	Evicted (Day 26)																		4
Mireia	Jhota	Jhota; Flor; Joaquín	Evicted (Day 19)									In House 2	Re-evicted (Day 89)									9
Flor	Chari	Julio; Chari; Joaquín	Ejected (Day 19)																			9
Julio	Lydia	Joaquín; Mireia; Cathaysa	Ejected (Day 19)																			9
Óscar	Marta	Evicted (Day 12)										In House 2	Re-evicted (Day 89)									3
Nomination Notes	See note^{1}	See note^{2}	See note^{3},^{4}	See note^{5}	See note^{6}, ^{7}	See note^{8}	See note^{9}	See note^{10}	None	See note^{11}	None	See note^{12}	See note^{13}	None	See note^{14}	None		See note^{15}	See note^{16}	See note^{17}		
Nominated for eviction	Julio; Lydia; Marta; Óscar	Joaquín; Marcelo; Mireia; Patricia	Anup; Julia; Marta; Patricia	Cathaysa; Eduardo; Lydia; Terry	Joaquín; Laura; Lydia; Marta	Cathaysa; Lydia; Pepa; Terry	Anup; Arturo; Dámaso; Marta	Jhota; Marta; Rubén	Anup; Chari; Yago	Anup; Cathaysa; Chari; Dámaso; Marta; Patricia	Anup; Marcelo; Marta	Jhota; Laura; Marta; Patricia	Laura; Marcelo; Marta; Patricia; Terry	Cathaysa; Dámaso; Terry	Marcelo; Terry; Yago	Dámaso; Lydia; Rubén	Dámaso; Laura; Lydia; Marcelo	Dámaso; Laura	Laura; Marcelo; Marta	Laura; Marcelo; Yago		
Ejected	none	Flor; Julio	none																			
Evicted	Óscar; Most votes to evict	Mireia; Most votes to evict	Julia; 62% to evict	Eduardo; Most votes to evict	Joaquín; Most votes to evict	Pepa; 76.4% to evict	Arturo; 82.1% to evict	Rubén; 60.6% to evict	Yago; 51.5% to evict	Chari; 57.5% to evict	Anup; 65.3% to evict	Jhota; 52.7% to evict	Patricia; Most votes to evict	Cathaysa; 46.5% to evict	Terry; 62.19% to evict	Rubén; 38.7% to evict	Lydia; 72.7% to evict	Dámaso; 74% to evict	Marta; 66.1% to evict	Marcelo; 10.2% to win	Yago; 26.7% to win	
Evicted	Óscar; Most votes to evict	Mireia; Most votes to evict	Julia; 62% to evict	Eduardo; Most votes to evict	Joaquín; Most votes to evict	Pepa; 76.4% to evict	Arturo; 82.1% to evict	Rubén; 60.6% to evict	Yago; 51.5% to evict	Chari; 57.5% to evict	Anup; 65.3% to evict	Jhota; 52.7% to evict	Patricia; Most votes to evict	Cathaysa; 46.5% to evict	Terry; 62.19% to evict	Rubén; 38.7% to evict	Lydia; 72.7% to evict	Dámaso; 74% to evict	Marta; 66.1% to evict	Laura; 63.1% to win		

=== Nominations and eviction notes ===
- ^1 The housemates in house 1 had to nominate 2 people in a group consensus, meaning all housemates had to agree on the potential nominees for eviction. It was decided that the two nominees would be Julio and Lydia. These nominees then had to choose from Marta, Óscar and Yago for who would be the third and fourth nominee. They chose Marta and Óscar.
- ^2 The housemates in house 1 had to nominate 2 people in a group consensus, meaning all housemates had to agree on the potential nominees for eviction. It was decided that the two nominees would be Marcelo and Patricia. These nominees then had to choose from Flor, Joaquín, Julio and Mireia for who would be the third and fourth nominee. They chose Joaquín and Mireia. Terry won immunity because she was chosen by the housemates in house 2 as joker and she could nominate on any housemate behalf from color house. She chose Yago.
- ^3 The housemates in house 1 had to nominate 2 people in a group consensus, meaning all housemates had to agree on the potential nominees for eviction. It was decided that the two nominees would be Anup and Julia. These nominees then had to choose from Cathaysa, Jhota, Joaquín, Marta and Patricia for who would be the third and fourth nominee. They chose Marta and Patricia.
- ^4 Flor and Julio were ejected due to they planned what must do in the house to obtain more money outside the program which is against the rules.
- ^5 The housemates switched houses and Patricia as second one with most public votes could choose house which she would like to live that week. The housemates in house 1 had to nominate 2 people in a group consensus, meaning all housemates had to agree on the potential nominees for eviction. It was decided that the two nominees would be Cathaysa and Terry. These nominees then had to choose from Anup, Dámaso, Eduardo, Lauda and Lydia for who would be the third and fourth nominee. They chose Eduardo and Lydia. Jhota won immunity because he was chosen by the housemates in house 1 as joker.
- ^6 The nominations took place in houses at the beginning of the show, after nominations the housemates changed houses, which explains some of housemates nominated with other house's nomination process. The housemates in house 1 had to nominate 2 people in a group consensus, meaning all housemates had to agree on the potential nominees for eviction. Patricia won immunity as she passed a secret mission. It was decided that the two nominees would be Joaquín and Marta. These nominees then had to choose from Dámaso, Laura and Lydia for who would be the third and fourth nominee. They chose Laura and Lydia.
- ^7 Arturo and Pepa are new housemates as replacement for Julio and Flor who were ejected. They chose the new distribution of both houses.
- ^8 The housemates in house 1 had to nominate 2 people in a group consensus, meaning all housemates had to agree on the potential nominees for eviction. It was decided that the two nominees would be Cathaysa and Lydia. These nominees then had to choose from Patricia, Pepa, and Terry for who would be the third and fourth nominee. They chose Pepa and Terry. Chari won immunity because she was chosen by the housemates in house 2 as joker and she could send any housemate to the other house. She chose Laura who was she second one with most evict votes. Laura moved from house 2 to house 1 by decision of Chari.
- ^9 The housemates in house 1 had to nominate 2 people in a group consensus, meaning all housemates had to agree on the potential nominees for eviction. It was decided that the two nominees would be Anup and Dámaso. These nominees then had to choose from Arturo, Marta, and Patricia for who would be the third and fourth nominee. They chose Arturo and Marta. After nominations, both houses merged as one house and all the housemates will live together.
- ^10 The housemates had to choose between two diary rooms. *Housemates nominating 3,2 and 1 points positively to housemates they want to stay in the house. The rest of housemates nominated as they used to do.
- ^11 This week housemates were nominating to save, not evict. The Housemates with the least support from their fellow Housemates were nominated.
- ^12 On Day 82, five ex-housemates, Chari, Mireia, Óscar, Rubén, and Yago, returned to the Color House after an online public vote; A second round of online public voting will decide the top two ex-housemates to officially return to the Gran Hermano house as official housemates.
- ^13 Rubén was the first housemate to re-enter into the house with 43.17% and Yago was the second one to re-enter into the house with 25.97%. Laura and Terry were automatically nominated by Gran Hermano (Big Brother) after bad behavior between them.
- ^14 During the nominations, the housemates have travelled across the cursed temple. The housemates could find 9 stones which count 1 point. The housemates could distribute the points however they liked.
- ^15 Yago is immune as he passed a secret mission. This week, the housemates nominate to save two housemates and not to evict.
- ^16 Yago is immune as he passed a secret mission.
- ^17 For the final round, the public are voting for who they want to win Gran Hermano 12.

== El Debate: Blind Results ==
Gran Hermano presents 'El Debate' on Sunday nights presented by Jordi González, a debate show featuring the latest evictee and special guests; blind results shows the progress of the public vote for the next eviction show but doesn't reveal which housemate has the percentage.

Week	1ºPlace to Evict	2ºPlace to Evict	3ºPlace to Evict	4ºPlace to Evict	5ºPlace to Evict	6ºPlace to Evict
1	55.1%	35.4%	5.2%	4.3%		
2	51.1%	22.3%	15.4%	11.2%		
3	67.3%	27.9%	2.7%	2.1%		
4	42.4%	35.4%	12.4%	9.8%		
5	44.8%	42.1%	6.9%	6.2%		
6	85.1%	9%	4.3%	1.6%		
7	87.4%	5.1%	4%	3.5%		
8	54.7%	28.6%	16.7%			
9	58.4%	37.5%	4.1%			
10	49.5%	18.3%	13.9%	6.7%	6.2%	5.4%
11	44.6%	35.3%	20.1%			
12	47.9%	23.3%	16.6%	12.2%		
12	47.6%	24.2%	11.9%	11.6%	4.7%	
13	60.1%	22%	11.7%	3.4%	2.8%	
14	47.8%	37.2%	15%			
15	62.6%	26.8%	10.6%			
16	44.8%	30.7%	24.5%			
17	70.2%	21.8%	4.1%	3.9%		
18	78.2%	21.8%				
19	63.1%	33.7%	3.2%			
20	64%	24.2%	11.8%			

== Ratings ==
=== "Galas" ===
Show N°	Day	Viewers	Ratings share
1 – Launch	Sunday, 17 October	3.353.000	22.8%
2	Thursday, 21 October	2.707.000	19.4%
3	Thursday, 28 October	2.294.000	16.8%
4	Thursday, 4 November	2.596.000	18.7%
5	Thursday, 11 November	2.544.000	19.0%
6	Thursday, 18 November	2.521.000	18.8%
7	Thursday, 25 November	2.379.000	17.4%
8	Thursday, 2 December	2.451.000	17.4%
9	Thursday, 9 December	2.593.000	17.9%
10	Thursday, 16 December	2.745.000	19.2%
11	Thursday, 23 December	2.639.000	18.2%
12	Thursday, 30 December	2.905.000	19.9%
13	Thursday, 6 January	2.293.000	15.1%
14	Thursday, 13 January	2.622.000	18.5%
15	Thursday, 20 January	2.544.000	17.9%
16	Thursday, 27 January	2.731.000	18.5%
17	Thursday, 3 February	2.503.000	17.4%
18	Thursday, 10 February	2.656.000	18.3%
19	Thursday, 17 February	2.602.000	18.2%
20	Thursday, 24 February	2.403.000	16.9%
21	Thursday, 3 March	2.497.000	17.7%
22 - Final	Thursday, 10 March	3.231.000	22.2%

== Gran Hermano 24 horas ==
Gran Hermano 24 horas was a temporary television channel dedicated to the 24-hour coverage of the show. It was launched on 28 December 2010, replacing CNN+ on digital terrestrial television (DTT). The channel ceased transmission on 1 March 2011, when Divinity took over its place.
