= Gran Hermano (Spanish TV series) season 13 =

Gran Hermano
- Season 13
- Presented by: Mercedes Milá
- No. of days: 131
- No. of housemates: 22
- Winner: Pepe Flores
- Runner-up: María Sánchez
- No. of episodes: 25

Release
- Original network: Telecinco
- Original release: January 19 – May 18, 2012

Season chronology
- ← Previous; Season 12 Next → Season 14

Gran Hermano 12+1 was the 13th season of Gran Hermano, the Spanish version of Big Brother. The official name of this season is Gran Hermano 12+1, and the tag line is "Dale la vuelta" (Turn it over). The season started airing on 19 January 2012. Mercedes Milá is still the main host. The main eviction show is known as the "Gala". Beginning on the second week there is also a nominations show known as "Última Hora". "El Debate", a weekly spin-off show hosted by Jordi González, has recently evicted housemates return to the studio to comment on the house news. The grand prize this season is €300,000.

Following this season, a special spin-off series titled Gran Hermano 12+1: La Re-vuelta, which saw most of the 12+1 Housemates return to the house only days following the finale of the regular series. This new series saw the Housemates themselves vote each other off, with the evicted Housemates voting for the winner.

In the 2016 season Gran Hermano VIP 4, Daniel returned to the house.

== Housemates ==
The motto of the edition is Turn it over, with that they try "to open a door for the hope", in these times of crisis. In addition, it wanted to turn to the origins, with an alone house and fewer competitors. In this thirteenth edition it returned to modify the logo, that this time was consisting of the sum of all the eyes of the competitors.

Without losing the classic style of Gran Hermano, the edition 12+1 came loaded from innovations. Mercedes Milá announced in the show that, across eBay, everything the one that should want to compete might offer a quantity of money to buy a square in the house and turn into the "competitor + 1" of every week. All the benefits that were obtained would be destined entirely to Red Cross, which would help, across a specific project, the persons more duramente punished by the crisis.

The competitors expelled before Mary Joy, were expelled in a soundproof cabin of Telecinco's set.

| Housemates | Age | Residence | Occupation | Entered | Exited | Status |
|---|---|---|---|---|---|---|
| Pepe Flores | 33 | Madrid | Flamenco dancer | Day 1 | Day 131 | Winner |
| María Sánchez | 20 | Cádiz | Waitress | Day 29; Day 75 | Day 50; Day 131 | 7th Evicted |
| María Sánchez | 20 | Cádiz | Waitress | Day 29; Day 75 | Day 50; Day 131 | Runner-up |
| Daniel Santos | 19 | Burgos | Architecture student | Day 43 | Day 131 | 3rd Place |
| Alessandro Livi | 29 | Milan | Football player | Day 1 | Day 131 | 4th Place |
| Sindia Arcos | 24 | Seville | Agrarian worker | Day 1 Day 124 | Day 124; Day 127 | 18th Evicted |
| Hugo Pierna | 25 | Lleida | Dealer | Day 1 | Day 120 | 17th Evicted |
| Ariadna Sánchez | 28 | Madrid | Make-up artist | Day 1 Day 113 | Day 103; Day 127 | 16th Evicted |
| Noemí Merino | 25 | Lanzarote | Store coordinator and surfer | Day 1 Day 117 | Day 96; Day 127 | 15th Evicted |
| Cristian Villaescusa | 27 | Alicante | Businessman | Day 36; Day 75 | Day 64; Day 89 | 9th Evicted |
| Cristian Villaescusa | 27 | Alicante | Businessman | Day 36; Day 75 | Day 64; Day 89 | 14th Evicted |
| Marta Sánchez | 20 | Albacete | Nursery educator | Day 22; Day 110 | Day 85; Day 127 | 13th Evicted |
| Sergio Muro | 29 | Seville | Aircraft painter | Day 57 | Day 82 | 12th Evicted |
| Juan Molina Sanz | 40 | Barcelona | Priest and teacher | Day 1 | Day 75 | 11th Evicted |
| Berta Renedo | 28 | Valencia | Journalist | Day 43 | Day 68 | 10th Evicted |
| Michael Rivero | 27 | Huelva | Policeman | Day 1 | Day 57 | 8th Evicted |
| Pilar Ochoa "Ochoa" | 28 | La Rioja | Hotel manager | Day 1 | Day 43 | 6th Evicted |
| Verónica Crespo | 26 | Bilbao | Waitress | Day 8 | Day 36 | 5th Evicted |
| Mary Joy Sumayo | 18 | Valencia | Biology student | Day 1 | Day 29 | 4th Evicted |
| David García | 37 | Valencia | Salesman | Day 1 | Day 23 | Walked |
| Arístides Alonso "Aris" | 28 | Bilbao | Acupuncture practitioner | Day 15 | Day 22 | 3rd Evicted |
| Azucena Talavera | 22 | Toledo | Unemployed businesswoman | Day 1 | Day 15 | 2nd Evicted |
| Zulema Ibáñez | 27 | Barcelona | Cosmetic surgery consultant | Day 1 | Day 8 | 1st Evicted |

=== Aless ===
Aless was 29 years old and he was living in Milan. He was a footballer. He entered the House the 1 Day and a few days later started a relationship with Naomi. She traveled to Brazil's Exchange in week 7. There she had sex with Rafael, the winner of BBB. Returning to Spain, she declared that she will confessed everything to Alessandro, but she did not. This generated much controversy abroad. On Day 110 Alessandro became a finalist, although he thought that he was eliminated. He went to the central studio of Telecinco and saw videos of his passage through the House within the soundproof room. That same day, Alessandro chose Marta to accompany him until the end. He was fourth with 13.6%. He won La Re-Vuelta.

=== Ariadna ===
Ariadna was 28 years old and she was working as a make-up artist. She was the daughter of Fortu, a popular rock band singer. She had whole body full of tattoos and piercings. She came into the House on the Day 1. At first seemed that she liked Hugo, but at the end she fell in love with Michael. Whenever Ariadna made friendship with someone, her friend was eliminated. The program called "the curse of Ariadna" to this fact. The victims of the curse were Zulema, David, Vero, Ochoa, Michael, Juan, Berta, Cristian, and Noemí. In the end, she became very good friends with Dani. She was a contender to win and the leader of the Anti-Pepe's team. After facing the public vote seven times, Ariadna was finally eliminated on the Day 103 with 47.4%, when she entered to the studio, she got a standing ovation from the audience. On the Day 113 she returned to the House as a companion of Dani, opting to win a share of the prize if he was the winner. She lived in the secret room with him and with Alessandro & Marta's team. She took part in La Re-Vuelta.

=== Aris ===
Aris was 28 years old and he was from Bilbao. He was working as an acupuncture practitioner. Aristides turned into the third competitor +1 of the edition on Day 15, after gaining the bid (69.100 €) for a square that the program brought into play in the first show. Inside the contest, he had problems with Pepe. He liked to take care of Torso, the dog of the house. He was eliminated the Day 22 by 58% against Pepe. He only was one week into the house. He did not take part in La Re-Vuelta. After the contest, he had problems with the law as several robberies.

=== Azucena ===
Azucena was 22 years old and she was from Toledo. She was unemployed businesswoman. She had a malformation in her hands. She was eliminated the Day 15 on her first nomination with the 71,2 % of the votes against Arianda. She had good friendship with Sindia, but the friendship broke after Sindia saw things that Azucena said out of the house. She entered on La Re-Vuelta.

=== Berta ===
Berta was a journalist and she was 28 years old. She was from Valencia and she entered the House on Day 43. She turned into the octave competitor +1 of the edition. For a week she lived with Dani in the Pavilion, in a caravan canopy, hiding from the rest of contestants. Only Juan and Sindia knew their existence. She made a pact with Dani to not nominate each other, but she broke it in their second nominations. She was a good friend of Ari. Berta was eliminated the Day 68 with 50.9%. She participated in La Re-Vuelta.

=== Cristian ===
Cristian entered the House on Day 36 dressed like a clown. He defined himself as a sexist, racist, and xenophobic guy. He turned into the sixth competitor +1 of the edition. Cristian enters the house with a secret mission related to the weekly nominations. Inside the House, he had problems with Pepe and Dani. He was eliminated on the Day 64 with an unknown %. Cristian returned to the House on the Day 75 along with Maria, and the Day 82 he was admitted again with 4 votes in favor to re-admitted both (Maria and Cristian). He returned to be removed on the Day 89 with 49.4% of the votes. He had many discussions with the presenter of the show, Mercedes Milà, both in Big Brother 12+1 and in La Re-Vuelta.

=== Dani ===
Dani was 19 years old when he entered the House. He was from Burgos and studied architecture. He entered the House on Day 43. He turned into the seventh competitor +1 of the edition. For a week he lived with Berta in the Pavilion, in a caravan canopy, hiding from the rest of contestants. They made a pact to not nominate each other, but she broke it in their second nominations. Dani had many conflicts with Berta, Pepe, Cristian and Hugo, but he stressed above all for being a very funny person. On Day 113 Dani became a finalist, although he thought that he was eliminated. He went to the central studio of Telecinco and saw videos of his passage through the House within the soundproof room. That same day, Dani chose his friend Ariadna to accompany him until the end. He was third with 15,2%. He took part in La Re-Vuelta.

=== David ===
David was 37 years old and he was from Valencia. He entered the house the Day 1 and had a good friendship with Juan. He constantly seemed to be low and he was remembering his ex-wife and his children. He left voluntarily on Day 23. He did not have the option to return to enter the house when the return of the expelled ones took place, and neither could he elected +1 of the winner. He took part in La Re-Vuelta.

=== Hugo ===
Hugo was 25 years old and he was from Lleida. He came into the House on the Day 1. He had a relationship outside the House that broke when María entered into the competition and fell in love with him. He corresponded and began a romantic relationship with her. Within the contest Hugo never been noted for having problems with anyone except with Dani, who ever brought him freak out. Hugo was eliminated on the 120 Day in the false final organized by the programme, believing that he was the third runner-up of Gran Hermano 12+1. He took part in La Re-Vuelta.

=== Juan ===
Juan was 40 years old and he was a priest and teacher in Barcelona. He was a biker. He came into the House the Day 1 and he was eliminated the Day 75 with 56% of the votes. Inside the House, he had many problems with Zulema and later with Pepe, who nicknamed him "horny priest". He did not want to re-enter the House in La Re-Vuelta because their religious order did not allow it if he wanted to continue being priest.

=== María ===
Maria was from Cadiz and was 20 years old when he entered the House on Day 29. María entered the house with a secret mission related to the weekly challenge. Inside the House she fell in love with Hugo and began a relationship with him. She was eliminated on Day 50 with 60.2% of the votes. María returned to the House on the Day 75 along with Cristian, and the Day 82 she was admitted again with 4 votes in favor to re-admitted both (Maria and Cristian). On Day 125 Maria became finalist and chose Sindia as her finalist +1 alleging that she believed that they deserve to be together in the true final after having been deceived by the program. Into the program, she had a lot of arguments with Noemí. She was Runner-Up with 27,1%. She took part in La Re-Vuelta.

=== Marta ===
Marta was the first contestant of Albacete. She was 20 years old. She entered the House on Day 22. The program surprised Marta live at her house and given the chance to join the house immediately. She turned into the fourth competitor +1 of the edition. Marta was very superstitious and always carried in her hand a wooden clip, making use of the Spanish saying "knock on wood (to keep away bad luck)". Inside the House she was very good friend with Sindia and Pepe, and with Dani too. She had troubles with Veronica and Noemi, Juan and Hugo. She was nominated 8 times until she was eliminated on the 85 Day with 57.1% of the votes. On the 110 Day she returned to the House as a companion of Alessandro, opting to win a share of the prize if he was the winner. She lived in the secret room with him.

=== Mary Joy ===
Mary Joy was 18 years old and she was from Valencia. She was Philippine origin. She was studying Biology. She entered the house the Day 1 and she did friendship with Pepe, Sindia and later with Marta. She was considered by many (specially for Verónica) as an infantile and silly girl. She was fooling about with Alessandro. After facing the public vote two times, Mary Joy was finally eliminated on the Day 29 by 43% of the votes. She took part in La Re-Vuelta.

=== Michael ===
Michael was a policeman, he was 27 years old and he was from Huelva. He entered the house the Day 1 and he was eliminated the Day 57 by 52,2 % of the votes. He never had problems with anybody. Ariadna was inspired love of him, but he declared that he did not feel anything for her until he was eliminated and saw the videos where she was speaking about him. Till then he liked Mary Joy. He formed a part of La Re-Vuelta.

=== Noemí ===
Noemi was from Lanzarote and she was 25 years old. She came into the House on the Day 1 and within weeks she began a relationship with Alessandro. She traveled to Brazil's Exchange in week 7. There she had sex with Rafael, the winner of BBB. Returning to Spain, she declared that she will confessed everything to Alessandro, but she did not. This generated much controversy abroad. When the contest progressed, she was losing nerves and being insecure. She never kept a good friendship with the girls, especially with Maria. When Maria returned to the house, Naomi began to panic: she was afraid that Alessandro knew what happened in Brazil. She was considered a contender to win. After facing the public vote five times, she was finally evicted on the Day 96 with 52,15 percent of the votes. On the Day 117 she returned to the House as a companion of Pepe, opting to win a share of the prize if I was the winner. As +1 she showed far more unstable (that she did not participate in La Re-Vuelta). She was the first winner +1.

=== Ochoa ===
Pilar, to which everyone called Ochoa, was 28 years old and she was from La Rioja. She was promised by her boyfriend. She entered the house the Day 1 and she was eliminated the Day 43 by 64,2 %. She was friend of Ariadna, Verónica and David. She was a person very gossip that had some problem with Noemí. She took part in La Re-Vuelta.

=== Pepe ===
Pepe was a flamenco dancer and was 33 years old. He entered the Day 1 House and became very good friends with Sindia, Mary Joy, and more evening with Marta. Pepe was always a rival to beat. He had problems with many contestants, especially with Aris, Cristian and Juan. On Day 117 Pepe became a finalist, although he thought that he was eliminated. He went to the central studio of Telecinco and saw videos of his passage through the House within the soundproof room. That same day, Pepe chose Noemí to accompany him until the end following the advice of a friend of him in the set with a banner that said: "Choose Noemí". He won with 44,1% of the votes. He didn't want to return to the House for playing in La Re-Vuelta because he said that he needed a break time.

=== Sergio ===
Sergio was the boyfriend of Sindia. He entered the House on Day 57 with Paolo, ex-boyfriend of Noemi, and lived with him in the Pavilion. The audience decided that he entered the House; Paolo was expelled. He turned into the last competitor +1 of the edition. During his stay, he nominated as a couple with Sindia, but they could be nominated independently. He came into the House to try Sindia let her friendship with Pepe. They had many partner discussions until he was eliminated the Day 82 with 48.9% of the votes. He was called sexist.

=== Sindia ===
Sindia was 24 years old and she was agrarian worker. She came into the House the Day 1 by surprise, becoming the first contestant +1. Inside the House she kept a nice friendly relationship with Marta and especially with Pepe. That relationship was misinterpreted outside. On Day 57 Sergio, her boyfriend, went into the House. Sergio came into the House to try Sindia let her friendship with Pepe. They had many partner discussions until he was eliminated the Day 82 with 48.9% of the votes. During his stay, they nominated as a couple, but they could be nominated independently. During the rest of the competition, Sindia did not clear if she was still in love with Sergio. She was eliminated the Day 125 against Maria; the same day Maria chose her as her finalist +1 alleging that she believed that they deserve to be together in the true final after having been deceived by the program. She opted to win a share of the prize if María was the winner. She was a very cheerful and fun person. She took part in La Re-Vuelta.

=== Verónica ===
Vero was 26 years old and she was from Bilbao. Verónica turned into the second competitor +1 of the edition, after gaining the career Fuencarral-Guadalix to his two opponents, Thaisí and Jacobo, also back-up contestants. Verónica did friendship with Ariadna and had problems with Pepe, Marta, Sindia and with Mary Joy. She was serious person. She was eliminated the Day 36 by 75,2 % of the votes against two of her enemies. She took part in La Re-Vuelta.

=== Zulema ===
Zulema was 27 years old and she was from Barcelona. She was working as cosmetic suggested consultant. She entered the house the Day 1 and she was eliminated on the Day 8 with no revealed %. She declared that she had been wanting to get into the house since Gran Hermano 1. She did good friendship with Ariadna and she was not removing well with Juan. She did not take part in La Re-Vuelta because she had professional matters to attend.

== Nominations table ==
| | Week 1 | Week 2 | Week 3 | Week 4 | Week 5 | Week 6 | Week 7 | Week 8 | Week 9 | Week 10 | Week 11 | Week 12 | Week 13 | | Week 14 | Week 15 | Week 16 | Week 17 | | Week 18 | | Final | | Nominations received |
| | Week 1 | Week 2 | Week 3 | Week 4 | Week 5 | Week 6 | Week 7 | Week 8 | Week 9 | Week 10 | Week 11 | Week 12 | Day 82 | Day 85 | Week 14 | Week 15 | Week 16 | Day 110 | Day 113 | Day 117 | Day 120 | Final | | Nominations received |
|---|---|---|---|---|---|---|---|---|---|---|---|---|---|---|---|---|---|---|---|---|---|---|---|---|
| Pepe | David; Zulema | David; Juan | Aris; Juan | Sindia; Alessandro | Verónica; Michael | Michael; Juan | 2:Michael; 2:María | Michael; Cristian | Cristian; Berta | Berta; Juan | Juan; Ariadna | Ariadna; Daniel | Cristian; Ariadna | 6:Cristian; 1:Ariadna | Ariadna; Daniel | 1:Ariadna; 1:Daniel | María; Daniel | María; Daniel | María; Hugo | Secret Room; 3rd finalist | | Winner (Day 131) | | 23 |
| María | Not in House | | | | Exempt | Juan; Noemí | 1:Noemí | Evicted (Day 50) | | | | Nominated | Noemí; Ariadna | 6:Noemí; 1:Ariadna | Noemí; Ariadna | 1:Ariadna; 1:Daniel | Daniel; Alessandro | Daniel; Pepe | Pepe; Sindia | Nominated | Nominated | Runner-Up (Day 131) | | 37 |
| Daniel | Not in House | | | | | | Secret; Caravan | Exempt | Alessandro; Cristian | Juan; Noemí | Juan; Hugo | Sergio; Noemí | Cristian; Noemí | 6:Cristian; 1:Noemí | Noemí; Hugo | 2:Alessandro; 1:Hugo | Hugo; Alessandro | Hugo; María | Secret Room; 2nd finalist | | | Third place (Day 131) | | 34 |
| Alessandro | Ariadna; Zulema | Azucena; Ariadna | Ochoa; Aris | Pepe; Noemí | Ariadna; Marta | Ariadna; María | 3:Ariadna; 2:Marta; 2:Cristian; 1:María; 1:Michael | Marta; Ariadna | Berta; Marta | Berta; Ariadna | Juan; Daniel | Ariadna; Sergio | Ariadna; María | 6:Daniel; 6:Ariadna | Ariadna; Daniel | 1:María; 1:Daniel | Daniel; María | Secret Room; 1st finalist | | | | Fourth place (Day 131) | | 10 |
| Sindia | Ariadna; David | Ariadna; David | Michael; Aris | Pepe; Mary Joy | Noemí; Ariadna | María; Michael | 3:Michael; 3:Noemí | Exempt | Berta; Cristian | Berta; Ariadna | Ariadna; Noemí | Ariadna; Daniel | Ariadna; Noemí | 2:Noemí; 2:Ariadna | Noemí; Ariadna | 2:Ariadna; 1:Daniel | Hugo; María | Hugo; María | Hugo; María | Nominated | Nominated | +1 Runner-Up (Day 131) | | 24 |
| Hugo | Azucena; Mary Joy | Azucena; Verónica | Mary Joy; Aris | Noemí; Pepe | Verónica; Ochoa | Marta; Ochoa | 3:Marta; 2:Cristian | Cristian; Marta | Daniel; Cristian | Berta; Daniel | Juan; Ariadna | Sergio; Marta | Cristian; Marta | 10:Cristian; 2:Daniel | Daniel; Ariadna | 1:Daniel; 1:Ariadna; 1:Sindia | Daniel; Sindia | Daniel; Sindia | Sindia; Pepe | Nominated | Evicted (Day 120) | | | 22 |
| Ariadna | Mary Joy; Noemí | Noemí; Juan | Aris; Alessandro | Verónica; Michael | Marta; Sindia | Alessandro; Sindia | 3:Noemí; 2:Alessandro; 1:Cristian; 1:María | Marta; Alessandro | Juan; Marta | Marta; Pepe | Pepe; Marta | Marta; Sindia | Sindia; Marta | 4:Sindia; 3:María | Sindia; María | 1:Hugo; 1:Alessandro | Evicted (Day 103) | | Secret Room +2 finalist | | | +1 Third place (Day 131) | | 51 |
| Noemí | David; Zulema | Azucena; Ariadna | Aris; Mary Joy | Hugo; Alessandro | Marta; Ochoa | Ochoa; María | 2:Marta; 2:María; 1:Cristian; 1:Sindia | Marta; Michael | Marta; Sindia | Marta; Berta | Marta; Daniel | Marta; Sergio | Marta; María | 9:María; 3:Daniel | María; Daniel | Evicted (Day 96) | | | | Secret Room +3 finalist | | +1 Winner (Day 131) | | 41 |
| Cristian | Not in House | | | | | Exempt | Juan | Pepe; Marta | Pepe; Hugo | Evicted (Day 64) | | Nominated | Hugo; Pepe | 4:Hugo; 3:Pepe | Re-Evicted (Day 89) | | | | | | | | | 38 |
| Marta | Not in House | | | Pepe; Sindia | Verónica; Noemí | Hugo; Michael | 2:Noemí; 1:Hugo | Michael; Noemí | Cristian; Berta | Berta; Ariadna | Ariadna; Noemí | Noemí; Ariadna | Noemí; Ariadna | Evicted (Day 85) | | | | Secret Room +1 finalist | | | | +1 Fourth place (Day 131) | | 36 |
| Sergio | Not in House | | | | | | | | Nominated | Exempt | Ariadna; Noemí | Ariadna; Daniel | Evicted (Day 82) | | | | | | | | | | | 4 |
| Juan | Ariadna; Zulema | Pepe; Ariadna | Pepe; Aris | Michael; Noemí | Marta; Sindia | Pepe; María | 3:Ariadna; 2:María; 1:Hugo | Exempt | Pepe; Sindia | Pepe; Daniel | Alessandro; Pepe | Evicted (Day 75) | | | | | | | | | | | | 10 |
| Berta | Not in House | | | | | | Secret; Caravan | Exempt | Marta; Sindia | Pepe; Daniel | Evicted (Day 68) | | | | | | | | | | | | | 10 |
| Paolo | Not in House | | | | | | | | Nominated | Evicted (Day 64) | | | | | | | | | | | | | | 0 |
| Michael | David; Sindia | Azucena; Noemí | Pepe; Aris | Juan; Ariadna | Marta; Sindia | Pepe; Sindia | 3:Pepe; 3:Sindia | Pepe; Marta | Evicted (Day 57) | | | | | | | | | | | | | | | 12 |
| Ochoa | Mary Joy; Sindia | Verónica; Noemí | Aris; Hugo | Ariadna; Verónica | Marta; Hugo | Noemí; Marta | Evicted (Day 43) | | | | | | | | | | | | | | | | | 4 |
| Verónica | Not in House | Mary Joy; Noemí | Hugo; David | Ariadna; Ochoa | Marta; Pepe | Evicted (Day 36) | | | | | | | | | | | | | | | | | | 4 |
| Mary Joy | Ariadna; Zulema | Noemí; Verónica | Aris; David | Sindia; Pepe | Evicted (Day 29) | | | | | | | | | | | | | | | | | | | 7 |
| David | Pepe; Sindia | Azucena; Pepe | Aris; Mary Joy | Walked (Day 23) | | | | | | | | | | | | | | | | | | | | 10 |
| Aris | Not in House | | Pepe; Noemí | Evicted (Day 22) | | | | | | | | | | | | | | | | | | | | 11 |
| Azucena | David; Noemí | Noemí; Hugo | Evicted (Day 15) | | | | | | | | | | | | | | | | | | | | | 6 |
| Zulema | David; Mary Joy | Evicted (Day 8) | | | | | | | | | | | | | | | | | | | | | | 5 |
| Nominations Notes | none | none | none | ^{1} | ^{2} | ^{3} | ^{4} | ^{5} | ^{6} | | ^{7} | ^{8} | none | ^{9} | none | ^{10} | ^{11}, ^{12} | ^{11}, ^{13} | ^{11}, ^{14} | ^{15} | ^{16} | | | |
| Nominated for eviction | Ariadna; David; Mary Joy; Zulema | Ariadna; Azucena; Noemí | Aris; Mary Joy; Pepe | Hugo; Juan; Marta; Mary Joy; Ochoa | Marta; Sindia; Verónica | Juan; María; Marta; Michael; Noemí; Ochoa; Sindia | Juan; María; Noemí | Cristian; Marta; Michael; Pepe | Paolo; Sergio; None | Ariadna; Berta; Daniel; Pepe | Ariadna; Daniel; Juan; Marta; Noemí; Pepe | Cristian; María | Ariadna; Cristian; Marta; Noemí | Cristian; Daniel; María | Ariadna; Daniel; Noemí | Alessandro; Ariadna; Daniel | Alessandro; Daniel; Hugo; María | Daniel; Hugo; María | Hugo; María; Pepe; Sindia | Hugo; María; Sindia | María; Sindia | Alessandro; Daniel; María; Pepe | | |
| Nominated for eviction | Ariadna; David; Mary Joy; Zulema | Ariadna; Azucena; Noemí | Aris; Mary Joy; Pepe | Hugo; Juan; Marta; Mary Joy; Ochoa | Marta; Sindia; Verónica | Juan; María; Marta; Michael; Noemí; Ochoa; Sindia | Juan; María; Noemí | Cristian; Marta; Michael; Pepe | Berta; Cristian; Marta | Ariadna; Berta; Daniel; Pepe | Ariadna; Daniel; Juan; Marta; Noemí; Pepe | Ariadna; Marta; Sergio | Ariadna; Cristian; Marta; Noemí | Cristian; Daniel; María | Ariadna; Daniel; Noemí | Alessandro; Ariadna; Daniel | Alessandro; Daniel; Hugo; María | Daniel; Hugo; María | Hugo; María; Pepe; Sindia | Hugo; María; Sindia | María; Sindia | Alessandro; Daniel; María; Pepe | | |
| Walked | none | | | David | none | | | | | | | | | | | | | | | | | | | |
| Evicted | Zulema; Most votes to evict (out of 2) | Azucena; 71.2% to evict (out of 2) | Aris; 58% to evict (out of 2) | Mary Joy; 43% to evict | Verónica; 75.2% to evict | Ochoa; 64.2% to evict | María; 60.2% to evict (out of 2) | Michael; 52.2% to evict | Sergio; 54.69% to enter | Berta; 50.9% to evict | Juan; 56% to evict | Cristian; María; 4 votes to stay | Marta; 57.1% to evict | Cristian; 49.4% to evict | Noemí; 52.15% to evict | Ariadna; 47.4% to evict | Alessandro; 38.9% to be finalist | Daniel; 40% to be finalist | Pepe; 86.75% to be finalist | Hugo; 10.2% to be finalist | Sindia; 48.4% to be finalist | Alessandro; 13.6% to win | Daniel; 15.2% to win | |
| Evicted | Zulema; Most votes to evict (out of 2) | Azucena; 71.2% to evict (out of 2) | Aris; 58% to evict (out of 2) | Mary Joy; 43% to evict | Verónica; 75.2% to evict | Ochoa; 64.2% to evict | María; 60.2% to evict (out of 2) | Michael; 52.2% to evict | Cristian; Most votes to evict | Berta; 50.9% to evict | Juan; 56% to evict | Sergio; 48.9% to evict | Marta; 57.1% to evict | Cristian; 49.4% to evict | Noemí; 52.15% to evict | Ariadna; 47.4% to evict | Alessandro; 38.9% to be finalist | Daniel; 40% to be finalist | Pepe; 86.75% to be finalist | Hugo; 10.2% to be finalist | Sindia; 48.4% to be finalist | María; 27.1% to win | Pepe; 44.1% to win | |

=== Nominations and eviction notes ===
- ^1 This round, the housemates nominated for those who they wanted to stay with themselves. The housemates with the fewest votes were nominated.
- ^2 The nominations day changed from Monday to Thursday and for this reason María was immune as she was a new housemate.
- ^3 Cristian was immune as he was a new housemate. Pepe won the right to save a nominee, so he saved himself.
- ^4 The housemates nominated according to the points that each housemate got in a task. Cristian won the power to automatically nominate a housemate. He nominated Juan.
- ^5 Berta, Daniel, Juan and Sindia were immune as they completed a secret challenge successfully.
- ^6 Paolo, Noemí's ex-boyfriend and Sergio, Sindia's boyfriend entered the house on Day 57. They public will choose if one or none of them should stay in the house. If Paolo or Sergio enter, the selected housemate will join to Noemí or Sindia.
- ^7 On round 11 the relatives and friends of the housemates made the nominations.
- ^8 Housemates choose both Cristian and María to remain in the house.
- ^9 The housemates nominated according to the points that got in a task. Each housemate choose one of the three special guests Pedro Oliva (GH4), Pepe Herrero (GH7) and Rafael "Fael" Cordeiro (BBB12) where each one wore a secretly T-shirt with the points.
- ^10 Housemates would receive 2 extra points in the nominations if they correctly answers 2 questions.
- ^11 Unknown to the housemates, the nominations were to determine the finalists.
- ^12 Alessandro was the first finalist and he chose Marta to be his partner in the final.
- ^13 Daniel was the second finalist and he chose Ariadna to be his partner in the final.
- ^14 Pepe was the third finalist and he chose Noemi to be his partner in the final.
- ^15 Hugo received fewest votes to be finalist and was evicted.
- ^16 Maria was the fourth finalist and she chose Sindia to be her partner in the final.

== Twists ==
- The "+1 contestant": During the first weeks, a new housemate is added to the original line-up each week so that the number of housemates remains 12+1. Each "+1 contestant" is selected in a different way:
  - Week 1: Sindia, who was told she was a back-up contestant, is surprised live on the street and given the chance to join the house immediately.
  - Week 2: Three back-up contestants compete in a hitchhiking race from the central studio to the house. Verónica arrives first and enters the house.
  - Week 3: A spot in the house is sold through an eBay auction that is open for a week. Arístides wins the auction at €69,100.
  - Week 4: Marta, a back-up contestant, is surprised live at her house and given the chance to join the house immediately.
  - Week 5: María enters the house with a secret mission related to the weekly challenge.
  - Week 6: Cristian enters the house with a secret mission related to the weekly nominations.
  - Week 7: An open call is made for potential contestants from provinces of Spain that have never been represented by a housemate on Gran Hermano history. Daniel is from Burgos, a Spanish province which was never represented in Gran Hermano.
- The soundproof room: A cristal soundproof room is installed at the central studio. The first three weeks, the two contestants that were leading the televote for eviction were taken on a van from the eviction room to the soundproof room. There, they were briefly interviewed by the host and could see the reasons given by their housemates to nominate them, so that they could defend themselves while the televoting lines were open. The non-evicted housemate was taken back to the house. From Week 16, the nominees chosen by the audience to become a finalist are taken to the soundproof room to be interviewed, thinking that they have been evicted. After the interview they are taken back to a secret room in the house.
- The Mouth of Wishes: The contestants can ask the Mouth of Wishes for anything, proposing a counterweight for it. The Mouth can accept the deal or not. Each contestant can make just one wish during the contest.
- "Turn It Over": From Week 16, when there are six contestants left, the audience votes for the nominee they want to become a finalist. While the finalist is taken to a secret room in the house, the contestants remaining at the original house are unaware of the situation, thinking their fellow housemate has been evicted and that they are themselves closer to the final.
- The "+1 winner": The contestants chosen to become finalists from week 16 are given the chance to choose a formerly evicted housemate to be their partner in the secret room. The companion of the winner will become the "+1 winner", receiving a secondary prize of €20,000.
- "Gran Hermano: La Re-vuelta": after the final night, 16 of 22 housemates of Gran Hermano 12+1 will re-enter the house for a new flash edition, in which they could solve or not their suspended accounts. The details are still to be discovered but the reward will be €20,000.

=== Repechage ===
The public voted to decide the top ex-housemates to officially return to the Gran Hermano house as official housemates.

The repechage was officially announced on Day 68 (26 March 2012). All the evicted housemates (Zulema, Azucena, Aris, Mary Joy, Verónica, Ochoa, María, Michael, Cristian and Berta) were eligible to become an official housemate. There were also an option of None ex-housemates to come back to the house. Five housemates were finalists, and two re-entered the house on Day 75 (2 April) chosen by the viewers.

| Ex-housemate | % | Elimination's Day |
|---|---|---|
| María | 48.2% | Finalist by public |
| Cristian | 28.1% | Finalist by public |
| None | 8.2% | Gala 2 April 2012 |
| Aris | 6.4% | Gala 2 April 2012 |
| Michael | 4.6% | Gala 2 April 2012 |
| Mary Joy | TBA | Debate 29 March 2012 |
| Ochoa | TBA | Debate 29 March 2012 |
| Zulema | TBA | Debate 29 March 2012 |
| Verónica | TBA | Debate 29 March 2012 |
| Azucena | TBA | Debate 29 March 2012 |
| Berta | TBA | Debate 29 March 2012 |

On Day 82, the housemates voted for who should re-enter in the House between Cristian and María. They also could vote if they wanted both to re-enter o anybody.

| Ex-housemate | Votes | Voted by... |
|---|---|---|
| Both | 4 | Noemí, Alessandro, Ariadna and Marta |
| María | 3 | Pepe, Hugo and Dani |
| Cristian | 1 | Sergio/Sindia |
| Nobody | 0 | - |

== Housemate exchange ==
From March 8 to March 15, 2012, 23-year-old student Laisa Portella from Big Brother Brasil 12 spent 7 days in the Spanish house as part of the Brazilian Week. The following week (March 16 to 21), Noemí Merino spent 5 days in the Brazilian house.

== El Debate: Blind results ==
| Week | 1stPlace to Evict | 2ndPlace to Evict | 3rdPlace to Evict | 4thPlace to Evict | 5thPlace to Evict | 6thPlace to Evict | 7thPlace to Evict |
|---|---|---|---|---|---|---|---|
| 5 | 79.0% | 15.2% | 5.8% | | | | |
| 6 | 65.9% | 14.6% | 6.2% | 6.2% | 4.7% | 1.5% | 0.9% |
| 7 | 64.2% | 32.2% | 3.6% | | | | |
| 8 | 49.4% | 22.7% | 20.3% | 7.6% | | | |
| 9 | 51.1% | 33.3% | 15.6% | | | | |
| 9 | 55.5% | 26.2% | 18.3% | | | | |
| 10 | 55.6% | 29.9% | 11.6% | 2.9% | | | |
| 11 | 48.4% | 29.6% | 14.3% | 3.3% | 2.7% | 1.6% | |
| 12 | 51.3% | 40.7% | 8.0% | | | | |
| 13 | --Not shown-- | | | | | | |
| 13 | --Not shown-- | | | | | | |
| 14 | 50.81% | 47.72% | 1.47% | | | | |
| 15 | 41.0% | 37.8% | 21.2% | | | | |
| 16 | --Not shown-- | | | | | | |
| 17 | --Not shown-- | | | | | | |
| 17 | --Not shown-- | | | | | | |
| 18 | 65.7% | 22.6% | 11.7% | | | | |
| 18 | --Not shown-- | | | | | | |
| 19 | 53.1% | 22.3% | 14.3% | 10.3% | | | |

== Ratings ==
=== "Galas" ===
| Show N° | Day | Viewers | Ratings share |
|---|---|---|---|
| 1 - Launch | Thursday, January 19 | 3,528,000 | 24.5% |
| 2 | Thursday, January 26 | 2,686,000 | 18.0% |
| 3 | Thursday, February 2 | 2,685,000 | 18.2% |
| 4 | Thursday, February 9 | 2,921,000 | 19.8% |
| 5 | Thursday, February 16 | 2,623,000 | 18% |
| 6 | Thursday, February 23 | 2,740,000 | 18.5% |
| 7 | Thursday, March 1 | 2,749,000 | 19.8% |
| 8 | Thursday, March 8 | 2,526,000 | 17.3% |
| 9 | Thursday, March 15 | 2,650,000 | 19.0% |
| 10 | Thursday, March 22 | 2,885,000 | 20.2% |
| 11 | Monday, March 26 | 2,615,000 | 17.7% |
| 12 | Monday, April 2 | 2,614,000 | 18.0% |
| 13 | Monday, April 9 | 2,826,000 | 19.6% |
| 14 | Thursday, April 12 | 3,135,000 | 20.3% |
| 15 | Monday, April 16 | 2,988,000 | 20.8% |
| 16 | Monday, April 23 | 3,062,000 | 21.8% |
| 17 | Monday, April 30 | 2,880,000 | 20.2% |
| 18 | Thursday, May 3 | 2,636,000 | 17.7% |
| 19 | Monday, May 7 | 3,313,000 | 23.1% |
| 20 | Thursday, May 10 | 3,273,000 | 23.0% |
| 21 | Monday, May 14 | 3,236,000 | 22.4% |
| 22 | Thursday, May 17 | 3,196,000 | 22.1% |
| 23 | Monday, May 21 | 3,538,000 | 25.0% |
| 24 | Thursday, May 24 | 3,029,000 | 20.9% |
| 25 - Final | Monday, May 28 | 3,976,000 | 28.2% |

=== "El Debate" ===
| Show N° | Day | Viewers | Ratings share |
|---|---|---|---|
| 1 | Sunday, January 22 | 1,048,000 | 16.0% |
| 2 | Sunday, January 29 | 1,063,000 | 17.5% |
| 3 | Sunday, February 5 | 1,149,000 | 16.8% |
| 4 | Sunday, February 12 | 1,228,000 | 19.7% |
| 5 | Sunday, February 19 | 1,154,000 | 17.6% |
| 6 | Sunday, February 26 | 1,153,000 | 18.4% |
| 7 | Sunday, March 4 | 1,048,000 | 17.6% |
| 8 | Sunday, March 11 | 1,165,000 | 21.6% |
| 9 | Sunday, March 18 | 1,183,000 | 20.0% |
| 10 | Sunday, March 25 | 1,312,000 | 22.2% |
| 11 | Thursday, March 29 | 1,793,000 | 18.4% |
| 12 | Thursday, April 5 | 1,401,000 | 13.5% |
| 13 | Thursday, April 19 | 1,784,000 | 18.9% |
| 14 | Thursday, April 26 | 1,876,000 | 20.8% |
| 15 | Wednesday, May 2 | 1,432,000 | 19.0% |
| 16 | Wednesday, May 16 | 1,223,000 | 17.6% |
| 17 | Wednesday, May 16 | 1,192,000 | 18.0% |

=== "Última Hora" ===
| Show N° | Day | Viewers | Ratings share |
|---|---|---|---|
| 1 | Monday, January 30 | 2,705,000 | 12.8% |
| 2 | Monday, February 6 | 2,492,000 | 11.7% |
| 3 | Monday, February 13 | 2,548,000 | 11.9% |
| 4 | Monday, February 20 | 2,487,000 | 12.3% |
| 5 | Tuesday, February 28 | 2,443,000 | 11.9% |

== La Re-vuelta ==
On May 24, 2012, during the main show of the Gala for Gran Hermano 12+1, Gran Hermano host Mercedes Milá confirmed that the Gran Hermano house will open again just three days after the Gran Hermano 12+1 finale, this time however with former housemates from last season of Gran Hermano. The grand prize of this season is €20,000 and every ex-housemate from Gran Hermano 12+1 could win the prize.

Gran Hermano 12+1: La Re-vuelta was broadcast on May 30, 2012 and ended on June 13 2012.

== See also ==
- Main article about the show
