= Francisco Nicolás Gómez Iglesias =

Spanish impostor (born 1994)

- Born: Francisco Nicolás Gómez Iglesias; April 18, 1994 (age 31); Móstoles, Spain
- Occupation: Law student

Francisco Nicolás Gómez Iglesias (born April 18, 1994, in Móstoles) nicknamed by Spanish press as "El pequeño Nicolás" (Little Nicholas) is a Spanish celebrity and former student of Law famous for infiltrating himself into the Spanish high society and political parties as well as being arrested in October 2014 on charges of forgery, fraud and identity theft. Apparently, the young man infiltrated in the highest levels of Spanish political and economic power, going as far as to impersonate a member of the CNI (the Spanish intelligence agency) or being a guest in the crowning of Felipe VI.

== Biography ==
Francisco Nicolás has lived with his grandmother since he was 14.

Francisco Nicolás allegedly led a double life. While studying law at university he claimed to be an important person with political and business contacts, a claim that he used to take advantage of certain entities and individuals. Allegedly, he defrauded dozens of people, to whom he promised sizable business opportunities, thanks to his alleged contacts at the highest positions of the Spanish Administration, the Spanish government and even the CNI. He leased luxury cars to reinforce his fabricated stories and one of them was found with a blue light similar to that employed by undercover units of the security forces in emergencies and thus skipping red lights and avoiding jams. He even hired personal bodyguards to give credibility to his identities.

On October 14, 2014 he was arrested by the National Police on charges of forgery, fraud and identity theft. On October 17, the judge in the case agreed to release him on bail without bond. In November 2014, Francisco Nicolás gave interviews to Telecinco and El Mundo in which he claimed to have worked for the Spanish secret service, known as the Centro Nacional de Inteligencia (CNI), the Spanish Royal family and the vice presidency of the Spanish government. He also claimed to have been President of the youth organisation of the local group of the People's Party in Moncloa-Aravaca.

On 13 February 2015 he was arrested after not paying his share of a restaurant bill.

On 7 January 2016 he became a contestant and participated in the Spanish version of reality show Celebrity Big Brother: Gran Hermano VIP.

In 2019 he founded Influencia Joven, a party which is focused on Z generation and millennials.

On June 9, 2021, he was sentenced by the Madrid Provincial Court to his first sentence, one year and nine months in prison and a fine of 2,700 euros, for falsifying his ID so that a friend could do the selectivity tests for him. The Provincial Court of Madrid imposed him a three-year prison sentence in July 2021 for a crime of usurpation of public functions and another of active bribery, with the application of extenuating circumstances for "psychological anomalies and undue delays".

With regard to his supplantation of the identity of a public official in 2014, in July 2021 the Madrid Provincial Court sentenced him to three years' imprisonment for the offences of usurpation of public functions and active bribery, with the application of mitigating circumstances for "psychological anomaly and undue delay".

On 12 December 2022, the Provincial Court of Madrid sentenced him to his third conviction, once again for the offences of usurpation of public functions and falsification of official documents, by pretending to be a government envoy to broker the sale of a property. The sentence imposed for these offences amounted to three years and five months' imprisonment.

Finally, on March 29, 2023, it was made public that on March 3, the Provincial Court had sentenced him to another four years and three months in prison and to pay a fine of 7300 euros for the commission of the crimes of discovery and disclosure of secrets, violation of official secrets and active bribery, having been declared proven that he accessed confidential information from police databases to obtain perks and economic benefits.

The above sentences amount in total to twelve years and five months' imprisonment.
