= Gran Hermano: La Re-vuelta =

Gran Hermano 12+1: La Re-vuelta
- Presented by: Mercedes Milá
- No. of days: 15
- No. of housemates: 16
- Winner: Alessandro Livi
- Runner-up: Pilar Ochoa
- No. of episodes: 5

Release
- Original network: Telecinco
- Original release: May 30 – June 13, 2012

Gran Hermano 12+1: La Re-vuelta was broadcast on May 30, 2012 and ended on June 13, 2012. On May 24, 2012, during the main show of the Gala for Gran Hermano 12+1, the host Mercedes Milá confirmed that the Gran Hermano house will open again just three days after the Gran Hermano 12+1 finale, this time however with former housemates from last season of Gran Hermano. The grand prize of this season is €20,000 and every ex-housemate from Gran Hermano 12+1 could win the prize.

From 21 ex-housemates, Arístides Alonso, Juan Molina, Noemí Merino and Zulema Ibáñez declined the offer to enter the house again due to occupational or personal reasons. Pepe Flores, the eventual GH12+1 winner, did not participate in the "Re-vuelta".

== Housemates ==
Housemates	Age	Residence	Occupation	Entered	Exited	Status
Alessandro Livi	29	Milan	Football player	Day 1	Day 15	Winner
Pilar Ochoa	28	La Rioja	Hotel manager	Day 1	Day 15	Runner-up
David García	37	Valencia	Salesman	Day 1	Day 15	3rd Place
Verónica Crespo	26	Bilbao	Waitress	Day 1	Day 15	5th Evicted
Michael Rivero	27	Huelva	Policeman	Day 1	Day 15	5th Evicted
Cristian Villaescusa	27	Alicante	Businessman	Day 1	Day 15	5th Evicted
María Sánchez	20	Cádiz	Waitress	Day 1	Day 15	4th Evicted
Ariadna Sánchez	28	Madrid	Make-up artist	Day 1	Day 15	4th Evicted
Sergio Muro	29	Seville	Aircraft painter	Day 1	Day 13	3rd Evicted
Hugo Pierna	25	Lleida	Dealer	Day 1	Day 13	3rd Evicted
Berta Renedo	28	Valencia	Journalist	Day 1	Day 13	3rd Evicted
Mary Joy Sumayo	19	Valencia	Biology student	Day 1	Day 8	2nd Evicted
Sindia Arcos	24	Seville	Agrarian worker	Day 1	Day 8	2nd Evicted
Daniel Santos	19	Burgos	Architecture student	Day 1	Day 8	2nd Evicted
Azucena Talavera	22	Toledo	Unemployed	Day 1	Day 6	1st Evicted
Marta Sánchez	20	Albacete	Nursery educator	Day 1	Day 6	1st Evicted

== Voting history ==
Head of Household
Vote to Win

	Day 6	Day 8	Day 13	Day 15			Votes received
	Day 6	Day 8	Day 13	Round 1	Round 2	Final	Votes received
Alessandro	Ariadna	Berta	Berta	Ariadna	Michael	Winner (Day 15)	3
Ochoa	Azucena	Daniel	Sergio	Cristian	Cristian	Runner-Up (Day 15)	1
David	Azucena	Daniel	Berta	Verónica	Verónica	Third Place (Day 15)	3
Verónica	Mary Joy	Daniel	David	David	David	Ochoa	2
Michael	Sindia	Sindia	Alessandro	Alessandro	Alessandro	David	2
Cristian	Marta	Mary Joy	Hugo	María	Ochoa	David	4
María	Azucena	Sergio	Sergio	Ariadna	Evicted (Day 15)	Ochoa	4
Ariadna	Sindia	Sindia	María	María	Evicted (Day 15)	Ochoa	3
Sergio	Marta	Daniel	María	Evicted (Day 13)		Alessandro	5
Hugo	Marta	Mary Joy	Berta	Evicted (Day 13)		Alessandro	2
Berta	Daniel	Daniel	Hugo	Evicted (Day 13)		Ochoa	6
Mary Joy	Cristian	Michael	Evicted (Day 8)			Alessandro	3
Sindia	Sergio	Sergio	Evicted (Day 8)			Alessandro	4
Daniel	Berta	Berta	Evicted (Day 8)			Alessandro	7
Azucena	Daniel	Evicted (Day 6)				Alessandro	3
Marta	Cristian	Evicted (Day 6)				Alessandro	3
Notes	^{1}	^{2}	^{3}	^{4}	^{5}	^{6}	
Head of Household	Cristian	Ariadna	David	Alessandro			
Up for eviction	All; Housemates (out of 2)	All; Housemates (out of 3)	All; Housemates (out of 3)	All; Housemates (out of 2)	All; Housemates (out of 3)	Alessandro; David; Ochoa	
Evicted	Marta; 3 of 16 votes to evict	Daniel; 5 of 14 votes to evict	Berta; 3 of 11 votes to evict	Ariadna; 2 of 8 votes to evict	Cristian; 1 of 6 votes to evict	David; 2 of 13 votes to win	
Evicted	Marta; 3 of 16 votes to evict	Sindia; 2 of 14 votes to evict	Hugo; 2 of 11 votes to evict	Ariadna; 2 of 8 votes to evict	Michael; 1 of 6 votes to evict	Ochoa; 4 of 13 votes to win	
Evicted	Azucena; 3 of 16 votes to evict	Sindia; 2 of 14 votes to evict	Hugo; 2 of 11 votes to evict	María; 2 of 8 votes to evict	Michael; 1 of 6 votes to evict	Ochoa; 4 of 13 votes to win	
Evicted	Azucena; 3 of 16 votes to evict	Mary Joy; 2 of 14 votes to evict	Sergio; 2 of 11 votes to evict	María; 2 of 8 votes to evict	Verónica; 1 of 6 votes to evict	Alessandro; 7 of 13 votes to win	

- ^Note 1: Cristian opened the envelope, which revealed that the two housemates with the most votes would be evicted that night. Azucena and Marta received the most votes with three, so they were both evicted.
- ^Note 2: Ariadna opened the envelope, which revealed that the three housemates with the most votes would be evicted that night. Daniel received the most votes with five, so he was the first to be evicted. Then, Berta, Mary Joy, Sindia and Sergio received the second most votes with two, so Ariadna as HoH, broke the tie and choose to evict Sindia and Mary Joy.
- ^Note 3: David opened the envelope, which revealed that the three housemates with the most votes would be evicted that night. Berta received the most votes with five, so she was the first to be evicted. Then, Hugo, Maria and Sergio received the second most votes with two, so David as HoH, broke the tie and choose to evict Hugo and Sergio.
- ^Note 4: Alessandro opened the envelope, which revealed that the two housemates with the most votes would be evicted that night. Ariadna and María received the most votes with two, so they were both evicted.
- ^Note 5: Three housemates would be evicted on the second round of the final. All housemates received the same number of votes with one, so Alessandro as HoH, broke the tie and choose to evict Michael, Cristian and Veronica.
- ^Note 6: For the final round, the evicted housemates voted for the finalist they wanted to win.

== Ratings ==
=== "Galas" ===
Show N°	Day	Viewers	Ratings share
1 - Launch	Wednesday, May 30	2,704,000	19.8%
2	Monday, June 4	2,558,000	19.6%
3	Wednesday, June 6	2,343,000	18.1%
4	Monday, June 11	2,283,000	17.9%
5 - Final	Wednesday, June 13	2,473,000	19.7%

=== "El Debate" ===
Show N°	Day	Viewers	Ratings share
1	Thursday, May 31	1,194,000	18.1%
2	Thursday, June 7	1,192,000	15.6%
3	Thursday, June 14	622,000	14.0%

=== "Última Hora" ===
Show N°	Day	Viewers	Ratings share
1	Thursday, May 31	1,547,000	9.0%
2	Thursday, June 7	1,780,000	10.1%

== See also ==
- Main Article about the show
