= Gran Hermano (Argentine TV series) season 7 =

Gran Hermano
- Season 7
- Presented by: Jorge Rial; Mariano Peluffo
- No. of days: 164
- No. of housemates: 27
- Winner: Rodrigo Fernandez
- Runner-up: Walquiria D'Amato

Release
- Original network: Telefe
- Original release: November 2, 2011 – April 16, 2012

Season chronology
- ← Previous; Season 6 Next → Season 8

The seventh season of Gran Hermano Argentina started on November 2, 2011 on Telefe. The show's length was approximately five months, finished on April 16, 2012. The prize has been increased to AR$1,000,000 (USD235,000) which will be reduced according to how many times a housemate is nominated. The show is hosted by Jorge Rial, who has hosted the show since 2007, until January 13, 2012 when he left the show. Rial was replaced by Mariano Peluffo, who hosted Gran Hermano spinoff shows.

It became the longest series ever produced of any Big Brother show in the Americas with 164 days. All four finalists (Rodrigo, Walquiria, Jorge and Alex) also became the contestants in the continent with the most survived days in a single series. Rodrigo Fernandez became the winner, at age 19 became the youngest person to ever win the Argentinian series.

Also, this was the last series to air in Telefe, until 2022 when the network took over the format once more and greenlit the show's tenth civilian season.

== The House ==
The season 7 House is the same as the season 6 but it has been redecorated and added a new style. This season has another house called La casa de al lado (The House Next Door), where 4 potential housemates will live there until they pass to the main house, decision made by the public votes by SMS.

== Housemates ==
Official Housemates
Housemates	Age	Occupation	Residence	Day entered	Day exited	Status
Rodrigo Fernández	19	Student	Victoria, Entre Ríos	1	164	Winner
Walquiria D'Amato	27	Gastronomy student	Bahía Blanca	1	164	Runner-up
Jorge Apas	21	For hire	San Miguel de Tucumán	1	164	Third Place
Alex Reigenborn	21	Employee	Juan José Castelli, Chaco	1	164	Fourth Place
Agustina Quirós	21	Architecture student	Mendoza	1	162	Evicted
Juan Cruz Castorani	25	Finance employee	San Isidro	1	159	Evicted
Nazareno Bellini	22	Employee and kitchen assistant	Ramos Mejía	94	155	Evicted
Nazareno Bellini	22	Employee and kitchen assistant	Ramos Mejía	1	68	Evicted
Ornella de Luca	22	Lawyer student	Buenos Aires	1	152	Evicted
Mario Fabián Fredes	30	Sea lion trainer	Acha	1	148	Evicted
Victoria Irouleguy	18	Model	Mar de Plata	1	145	Evicted
Ailín Bourren	26	P.E. teacher	Tigre, Buenos Aires	1	138	Evicted
Noelia Ríos	21	Modelo	Misiones	94	127	Evicted
Noelia Ríos	21	Modelo	Misiones	71	87	Evicted
Florencia González	26	Model	Montevideo	1	120	Evicted
Víctor Scarpello	26	Football player	Mar de Plata	1	108	Evicted
Leandro Di Giusto	22	Lawyer student	Córdoba	1	101	Evicted
Tomás Loyola	26	Showman	Córdoba	94	99	Evicted
Tomás Loyola	26	Showman	Córdoba	71	94	Evicted
Mariana Salces	24	Educational psychology student	Salta	1	85	Walked
Ezequiel Tramannoni	22	Football player	Bernal, Buenos Aires	1	80	Evicted
Dolores Escala	30	Fashion designer	Olavarría	71	72	Walked
Juan Manuel Prieto	30	Commercial manager	Mendoza	1	64	Walked
Leonardo Chaves	22	Model	Montevideo	1	61	Evicted
Clarisa Abreu	22	Model	lavalleja	1	55	Evicted
Daniela Rocca	21	Medicine student	Buenos Aires	1	47	Evicted
Fabricio Chaves	22	Model	Montevideo	1	47	Walked
Lucas Piro	26	Dancer	Rosario	1	47	Evicted
Cynthia Creado	22	Administrative and massagist	Ciudadela, Buenos Aires	1	17	Evicted
Fernanda Pachecho	25	English teacher student	San Miguel de Tucumán	94	101	Evicted
Fernanda Pachecho	25	English teacher student	San Miguel de Tucumán	1	10	Evicted
Non selected housemates
Jesica & Jimena Ciccioli	22	Model	Armstrong	10	17	Non selected
Lucía Ibarra	27	Employee	Dolores	1	10	Non selected
Tomás Critelli	23	Unemployee	Los Polvorines	1	10	Non selected

The first name means two points and the second one, one point.

== Nominations table ==
The first housemate in each box was nominated for two points, and the second housemate was nominated for one point.

- This housemate could send half of their points to another housemate.
- This housemate own the power to save one of the nominated housemates.
- This housemate was saved by housemate.
- This housemate could avoid a housemate's nomination.

	Week 1	Week 2	Week 3	Week 4	Week 5	Week 6	Week 7	Week 8	Week 9	Week 10	Week 11	Week 12	Week 13	Week 14	Week 15	Week 16	Week 17	Week 18	Week 19	Week 20		Week 21		Week 22	Final		Nominations received
Rodrigo	No nominations	Fernanda; Agustina	~~4-Clarisa~~; ~~2-Mariana~~	Banned	Leandro; Mariana	Leandro; Mariana	Lucas; Clarisa	Clarisa; Mariana	Juan M. Nazareno	Agustina; Nazareno	Ezequiel; Victoria	Victoria; Tomás L.	~~Tomás L.~~; ~~Ailín~~	Victoria; Agustina	Victoria; Agustina	Victoria; Agustina	No nominations	Nazareno; Ailín	Nazareno; Victoria	Nazareno; Agustina	Nazareno; Agustina	Nazareno; Agustina	Juan C. Jorge	Agustina; Jorge	Winner (Day 164)		27.5
Walquiria	No nominations	Cynthia; Rodrigo	Mariana; Victoria	Mariana; Ezequiel	Daniela; Leandro	Nazareno; Leonardo	4-Mariana; 2-Ailín	Mariana; Leonardo	Leonardo; Juan M.	Ezequiel; Agustina	Mariana; Ezequiel	Ailín; Victoria	Ornella; ~~Victoria~~	Agustina; Victoria	Ailín; Ornella	Ornella; Victoria	No nominations	Ailín; Nazareno	Victoria; Nazareno	Ornella; Nazareno	Nazareno; Ornella	Nazareno; Agustina	Alex; Juan C.	Rodrigo; Alex	Runner-Up (Day 164)		35
Jorge	No nominations	Victoria; Ornella	3-Victoria; 2-Clarisa; 1-Ornella	Ezequiel; Clarisa	Victoria; Leandro	3-Lucas; 2-Victoria; 1-Leandro	~~Ornella~~; ~~Clarisa~~	4-Victoria; 2-Mariana	4-Ailín; 2-Leandro	Nazareno; Ezequiel	Ailín; Ezequiel	Ailín; Victoria	~~Victoria~~; ~~Tomás L.~~	Ailín; Victoria	Ornella; Victoria	Ornella; Victoria	No nominations	Ailín; Nazareno	Victoria; Ornella	Ornella; Nazareno	Agustina; Ornella	Agustina; Nazareno	Juan C. Rodrigo	Rodrigo; Agustina	Third Place (Day 164)		26
Alex	No nominations	Rodrigo; Walquiria	Lucas; Clarisa	Clarisa; Ailín	Lucas; Leandro	4-Mario; 2-Leandro	Clarisa; Ornella	Mariana; Ailín	Juan M. Leonardo	Ezequiel; Agustina	Ezequiel; Victoria	Victoria; Tomás L.	~~Victoria~~; ~~Tomás L.~~	Agustina; Victoria	Ornella; Victoria	Victoria; Ornella	No nominations	4-Nazareno; 2-Victoria	Nazareno; Victoria	Ornella; Nazareno	Ornella; Nazareno	Agustina; Nazareno	Juan C. Agustina	Agustina; Rodrigo	Fourth Place (Day 164)		28.5
Agustina	No nominations	Ezequiel; Mario	Ezequiel; Clarisa	Ezequiel; Alex	4-Alex; 2-Leandro	Victoria; Lucas	Lucas; Clarisa	Walquiria; Clarisa	Walquiria; Jorge	Walquiria; Florencia	Walquiria; Rodrigo	Florencia; Noelia	~~Leandro~~; ~~Alex~~	Leandro; Jorge	Florencia; Víctor	Florencia; Rodrigo	No nominations	Juan C. Alex	4-Juan C. 2-Alex	Walquiria; Mario	Jorge; Juan C.	Rodrigo; Walquiria	Jorge; Alex	Jorge; Alex	Evicted (Day 162)		40
Juan C.	No nominations	Fernanda; Mariana	Clarisa; Mariana	Daniela; Mariana	Daniela; Mariana	3-Lucas; 2-Ailín; 1-Mariana	3-Lucas; 2-Ailín; 1-Mariana	Victoria; Mariana	Mariana; Ailín	Ailín; Mariana	Ailín; Mariana	Victoria; Ailín	~~Tomás L.~~; ~~Ailín~~	4-Ailín; 2-Victoria	Ailín; Ornella	Ornella; Victoria	No nominations	4-Nazareno; 2-Ailín	Nazareno; Victoria	Nazareno; Agustina	Ornella; Nazareno	Agustina; Nazareno	Jorge; Rodrigo	Evicted (Day 159)			25.5
Nazareno	No nominations	Fernanda; Florencia	Ailín; Victoria	~~Ailín~~; ~~Clarisa~~	4-Ailín; 2-Clarisa	Mariana; Rodrigo	Clarisa; Mariana	Mariana; Clarisa	Mariana; Alex	Florencia; Mario	Evicted (Day 68)			House; Next Door	Exempt	Florencia; Noelia	No nominations	Juan C. Rodrigo	Alex; Juan C.	Mario; Juan C.	Jorge; Juan C.	Rodrigo; Walquiria	Re-evicted (Day 155)				72.5
Ornella	No nominations	Ezequiel; Leandro	3-Leandro; 2-Ailín; 1-Clarisa	Ailín; Nazareno	Leandro; Daniela	Mario; Leandro	Mario; Clarisa	Mario; Nazareno	Leandro; Alex	Florencia; Juan C.	Walquiria; Mario	Florencia; Noelia	~~Leandro~~; ~~Juan C.~~	~~Leandro~~; ~~Jorge~~	Florencia; Juan C.	Florencia; Juan C.	No nominations	Jorge; Alex	Juan C. Alex	Mario; Jorge	Jorge; Alex	Evicted (Day 152)					53
Mario	No nominations	Fernanda; Ailín	Victoria; Cynthia	Victoria; Fabricio	Daniela; Ornella	4-Victoria; 2-Ailín	Mariana; Ailín	Leonardo; Mariana	Juan M. Leonardo	Agustina; Ezequiel	Ezequiel; Mariana	Victoria; Ailín	~~Ailín~~; ~~Tomás L.~~	Agustina; Victoria	Ailín; Ornella	Victoria; Ornella	No nominations	Ailín; Nazareno	Victoria; Nazareno	Ornella; Nazareno	Evicted (Day 148)						58
Victoria	No nominations	Ornella; Agustina	~~Ornella~~; ~~Clarisa~~	Mariana; Ailín	Lucas; Daniela	~~Mariana~~; ~~Mario~~	4-Clarisa; 2-Lucas	Mariana; Mario	Jorge; Mario	Juan C. Mario	Rodrigo; Walquiria	~~Florencia~~; ~~Noelia~~	~~Florencia~~; ~~Leandro~~	Leandro; Jorge	Florencia; Mario	Florencia; Rodrigo	No nominations	Walquiria; Mario	Juan C. Walquiria	Evicted (Day 145)							84.5
Ailín	No nominations	Mario; Nazareno	Cynthia; Ornella	3-Ezequiel; 2-Victoria; 1-Nazareno	Ornella; Victoria	Victoria; Ornella	~~Victoria~~; ~~Ornella~~	Clarisa; Leonardo	Jorge; Leandro	Florencia; Juan C.	Rodrigo; Walquiria	Florencia; Noelia	~~Florencia~~; ~~Walquiria~~	Leandro; Jorge	Florencia; Mario	Florencia; Rodrigo	No nominations	Jorge; Mario	Evicted (Day 138)								95
Noelia	Not in House										Exempt	Ailín; Victoria	Evicted (Day 87)	House; Next Door	Exempt	Victoria; Ornella	No nominations	Re-evicted (Day 127)									10,5
Florencia	No nominations	Nazareno; Mario	Cynthia; Ornella	Mariana; Daniela	Ailín; Daniela	Leandro; Mario	Mariana; Ailín	Mariana; Mario	~~Juan M.~~; ~~Leonardo~~	Nazareno; Agustina	Ornella; Ailín	Ailín; Victoria	Tomás L. Ornella	Victoria; Ailín	Ornella; Ailín	Ornella; Victoria	Evicted (Day 120)										39
Víctor	No nominations	Fernanda; Ornella	Lucas; Alex	4-Ailín; 2-Daniela	3-Fabricio; 2-Mario; 1-Leonardo	Lucas; Leonardo	Clarisa; Lucas	Ailín; Clarisa	Leonardo; Leandro	Nazareno; Ailín	Ailín; Ezequiel	Ornella; Ailín	~~Ailín~~; ~~Victoria~~	Agustina; Ailín	Ailín; Ornella	Evicted (Day 108)											1
Leandro	No nominations	Fernanda; Victoria	Ornella; Clarisa	Mariana; Ornella	Clarisa; Daniela	Ornella; Ailín	House; Next Door	Exempt	Juan M. Leonardo	Agustina; Nazareno	Ornella; Ezequiel	Ailín; Victoria	~~Tomás L.~~; Ornella	Ailín; Agustina	Evicted (Day 101)												50
Tomás L.	Not in House										Exempt	Florencia; Mario	~~Florencia~~; ~~Víctor~~	House; Next Door	Re-evicted (Day 101)												4
Mariana	No nominations	Cynthia; Leandro	Cynthia; Lucas	Ezequiel; Victoria	Victoria; Leandro	Leandro; Nazareno	Nazareno; Lucas	~~Nazareno~~; ~~Walquiria~~	Walquiria; Leandro	Florencia; Juan C.	Walquiria; Rodrigo	Walked (Day 85)															67
Ezequiel	No nominations	Fernanda; Florencia	~~4-Lucas~~; ~~2-Clarisa~~	Ailín; Mariana	House; Next Door		House; Next Door	Exempt	Jorge; Alex	Juan C. Leandro	Rodrigo; Walquiria	Evicted (Day 80)															31,5
Dolores	Not in House										Walked (Day 72)																N/A
Juan M.	No nominations	Fernanda; Jorge	Mario; Ailín	Mario; Mariana	Mario; Mariana	Mario; Lucas	Mario; Clarisa	3-Mario; 2-Walquiria; 1-Mariana	Mario; Walquiria	Walked (Day 64)																	9
Leonardo	Not in House		House; Next Door	Ezequiel; Leandro	Clarisa; Lucas	Lucas; Mario	3-Walquiria; 2-Mario; 1-Lucas	Alex; Walquiria	4-Alex; 2-Walquiria	Evicted (Day 61)																	17.5
Clarisa	House; Next Door	Exempt	Victoria; Mariana	4-Mariana; 2-Nazareno	Daniela; Leandro	Nazareno; Ailín	~~Victoria~~; ~~Mariana~~	4-Leonardo; 2-Nazareno	Evicted (Day 55)																		41
Daniela	No nominations	Florencia; Leandro	Jorge; Cynthia	Nazareno; Frabicio	3-Mario; 2-Leandro; 1-Lucas	House; Next Door	House; Next Door	Evicted (Day 47)																			18
Fabricio	Not in House		House; Next Door	Leandro; Ezequiel	Lucas; Clarisa	Mario; Lucas	Mario; Walquiria	Walked (Day 47)																			4
Lucas	House; Next Door	House; Next Door	Victoria; Rodrigo	Mariana; Ailín	~~Ailín~~; ~~Leandro~~	Mariana; Alex	~~Ornella~~; ~~Victoria~~	Evicted (Day 47)																			38
Cynthia	No nominations	Fernanda; Ezequiel	Ailín; Agustina	Evicted (Day 17)																							12
Jesica & Jimena	Not in House		House; Next Door	Evicted (Day 17)																							0
Fernanda	No nominations	Ezequiel; Ornella	Evicted (Day 10)											House; Next Door	Re-evicted (Day 101)												18
Lucía	House; Next Door	House; Next Door	Evicted (Day 10)																								0
Tomás C.	House; Next Door	House; Next Door	Evicted (Day 10)																								0
Nominations Notes	1	2	3, 4, 5	4, 6	4, 7	4, 8	4, 9, 10	4, 11	4, 12	13	14	4, 15	16	4, 17, 18	19	20	21	4, 22	4, 23	4, 24	4, 25	4, 26	none				
Immune	none		Florencia	Juan M.	Ornella	Rodrigo	~~Clarisa~~	Ailín	Alex	none		Jorge	none														
Saved	none		Victoria	Ailín	Leandro	Lucas	Clarisa	Mariana	Juan M.	Florencia	none	Ailín	none						Nazareno	Ornella	Nazareno	none					
Up for eviction	Clarisa; Lucas; Lucía; Tomás C.	Lucas; Lucía; Tomás	Fabricio & Leonardo; Jesica & Jimena	Ezequiel; Mariana; Rodrigo	Daniela; Lucas	Leandro; Mario; Victoria	Daniela; Ezequiel; Leandro	Clarisa; Mario	Jorge; Leandro; Leonardo; Walquiria	Agustina; Nazareno	Ezequiel; Walquiria	Florencia; Noelia	Ornella; Tomás L.	Fernanda; Nazareno; Noelia; ~~Tomás L.~~	Ailín; Ornella; Víctor	Florencia; Ornella; Victoria	All housemates	Ailín; Nazareno	Alex; Victoria	Mario; Nazareno	Jorge; Ornella; Rodrigo	Agustina; Nazareno; Rodrigo	Jorge; Juan C.	Agustina; Rodrigo	Alex; Jorge; Rodrigo; Walquiria		
Up for eviction	Clarisa; Lucas; Lucía; Tomás C.	Ezequiel; Fernanda	Clarisa; Cynthia	Ezequiel; Mariana; Rodrigo	Daniela; Lucas	Leandro; Mario; Victoria	Lucas; Mario	Clarisa; Mario	Jorge; Leandro; Leonardo; Walquiria	Agustina; Nazareno	Ezequiel; Walquiria	Florencia; Noelia	Ornella; Tomás L.	Agustina; Ailín; Leandro	Ailín; Ornella; Víctor	Florencia; Ornella; Victoria	All housemates	Ailín; Nazareno	Alex; Victoria	Mario; Nazareno	Jorge; Ornella; Rodrigo	Agustina; Nazareno; Rodrigo	Jorge; Juan C.	Agustina; Rodrigo	Alex; Jorge; Rodrigo; Walquiria		
Walked	none							Fabricio	none	Juan M.	Dolores	Mariana	none														
Evicted	Clarisa; 76.59% to enter	Lucas; 59% to enter	Fabricio & Leonardo; 72.3% to enter	Ezequiel; Most votes to move	Daniela; 64% to move	Leandro; 45.05% to move	Daniela; 28% to re-enter	Clarisa; 50.18% to evict	Leonardo; 50.74% to evict (out of 2)	Nazareno; 53.74% to evict	Ezequiel; 65.42% to evict	Noelia; 65% to evict	Tomás L. 81.84% to evict	Fernanda; 11.56% to re-enter	Víctor; 58.11% to evict	Florencia; 51.06% to evict (out of 2)	Noelia; 48.5% to save (out of 2)	Ailín; 51.09% to evict	Victoria; 52.67% to evict	Mario; 53.54% to evict	Ornella; 48.73% to evict	Nazareno; 48.55% to evict	Juan C. 62.38% to evict	Agustina; 51.71% to evict	Alex; 10.70% (out of 4)	Jorge; 27.86% (out of 3)	
Evicted	Clarisa; 76.59% to enter	Fernanda; 52.16% to evict	Cynthia; 55.27% to evict	Ezequiel; Most votes to move	Daniela; 64% to move	Leandro; 45.05% to move	Lucas; 63.83% to evict	Clarisa; 50.18% to evict	Leonardo; 50.74% to evict (out of 2)	Nazareno; 53.74% to evict	Ezequiel; 65.42% to evict	Noelia; 65% to evict	Tomás L. 81.84% to evict	Leandro; 57.63% to evict	Víctor; 58.11% to evict	Florencia; 51.06% to evict (out of 2)	Noelia; 48.5% to save (out of 2)	Ailín; 51.09% to evict	Victoria; 52.67% to evict	Mario; 53.54% to evict	Ornella; 48.73% to evict	Nazareno; 48.55% to evict	Juan C. 62.38% to evict	Agustina; 51.71% to evict	Walquiria; 34.50% (out of 2)	Rodrigo; 35.90% to win	

=== Notes ===
- ^1 Clarisa, Lucas, Lucía and Tomás entered to the House Next Door where they will live for two weeks. The public will decide who of them will enter to the main house.
- ^2 Clarisa was the first housemate chosen by the public to enter the main house. Lucas, Lucía and Tomás remained nominated.
- ^3 Jimena & Jesica and Fabricio & Leandro were nominated because they were in the House Next Door.
- ^4 * Right to nominate with 3, 2 and 1 point. ** Right to nominate with 4 and 2 points. ***That housemate could send half of their votes to another person. **** That housemate could save one of the nominees. *****That housemate could avoid a housemate's points.
- ^5 The votes from Ezequiel, Rodrigo and Victoria were voided because they made a complot to vote for Clarisa. Leandro could save one of the nominees and he saved Victoria. Daniela sent half of her points (0) to Jorge and Víctor sent them (0) to Lucas. Victoria won the right to avoid Clarisa's points but as Victoria's points were voided, this power was voided too along with Ezequiel and Rodrigo's powers.
- ^6 Rodrigo was automatically nominated because he broke some rules. Leandro could save one of the nominees and he saved Ailín. Ezequiel sent half of his points (6,5) to Mariana and Fabricio sent them (1) to Daniela. Daniela won the right to avoid Nazareno's points.
- ^7 Ezequiel is immune as he is on The House Next Door. Mario could save one of the nominees and he saved Leandro. Mariana sent half of her points (1,5) to Victoria and Juan M. sent them (0) to Mario. Jorge won the right to avoid Lucas's points.
- ^8 Ezequiel and Daniela are immune as they are on The House Next Door. Clarisa could save one of the nominees and she saved Lucas. Walquiria sent half of her points (0) to Nazareno and Florencia sent them (0) to Leandro. Agustina won the right to avoid Victoria's points.
- ^9 Ezequiel, Daniela and Leandro are nominated as they are on The House Next Door. Agustina could save one of the nominees and she saved Clarisa. Víctor sent half of his points (0) to Ailín and Mariana sent them (5) to Nazareno. Lucas won the right to avoid Victoria's points.
- ^10 Ailín, Clarisa, Jorge and Lucas plotted together so their points were voided. Clarisa and Lucas' powers also were voided.
- ^11 Ezequiel and Leandro are exempt from nominating and be nominated as they moved from the House Next Door. Ornella could save one of the nominees and she saved Mariana. Leonardo sent half of his points (4) to Alex. Walquiria won the right to avoid Mariana's points.
- ^12 This round, the housemates with the power of send half of their votes to other housemates changed. The housemates with this power could send half of a housemate's votes to another one. Mario sends half of Alex's votes (3.5) to Nazareno and Víctor sends half of Ailín's votes (2.5) to Leonardo. Ailín won the right to avoid Florencia's points. All the housemates with 0 votes, had to save as a group one of the nominees, they saved Juan M..
- ^13 All the housemates with 0 votes had to save as a group one of the nominees; they saved Florencia.
- ^14 Noelia and Tomás L. were immune as new housemates.
- ^15 Ailín could save one of the nominees and she saved herself. Victoria sent half of her points (6.5) to Noelia and Rodrigo sent them (0) to Tomás L. Walquiria won the right to avoid Victoria's points.
- ^16 The producers voided all housemates' votes they considered plotted.
- ^17 Victoria sent half of her points (5) to Leandro and Alex sent them (0) to Victoria. Leandro won the right to avoid Ornella's points.
- ^18 The lines were open to voting for four evicted housemates Fernanda, Nazareno, Noelia and Tomás L. but he decided to quit from this nomination and leave the house definitely.
- ^19 Ornella won the power of choosing a third nominee. She chose Víctor.
- ^20 Juan C. and Victoria won the joker card which meant that they could automatically nominate a housemate. Victoria automatically nominated Florencia and Juan C. nominated Victoria, although she was already up for eviction.
- ^21 In week 17, there were no nominations because all the housemates were automatically nominated by Gran Hermano.
- ^22 Rodrigo sent half of his points (0.5) to Ailín and Agustina sent them (0) to Juan C..
- ^23 Juan C. sent half of his points (4.5) to Victoria. Rodrigo could save one of the nominees and he saved Nazareno.
- ^24 Ornella won the joker card which meant that she could automatically nominate a housemate. Ornella automatically nominated Mario. Rodrigo won the right to save a housemate, he saved Ornella.
- ^25 Nazareno won the joker card which meant that he could automatically nominate a housemate. Nazareno automatically nominated Rodrigo. Agustina won the right to save a housemate, she saved Nazareno.
- ^26 Nazareno won the joker card which meant that he could automatically nominate a housemate. Nazareno automatically nominated Rodrigo.
