= Lola Cordero =

Spanish journalist and actress

- Born: Dolores Cordero Gómez; 1 April 1973 (age 52); Barcelona, Spain
- Occupations: Journalist, actress
- Spouse: Alexis Puig
- Children: Lara (born 2008); Eva (born 2011)

Dolores Cordero Gómez (born 1 April 1973), better known as Lola Cordero, is a Spanish journalist and actress who lives in Argentina. She is currently a panelist on Bendita on Canal 9, hosted by Beto Casella. On radio, she participates in Bien levantado on Pop Radio and Mañana Sylvestre on Radio 10.

== Biography ==
Dolores Cordero Gómez was born in Barcelona. At age 12 she moved to Seville, where her parents lived. At age 22 she went to live alone in Madrid. There she studied social work and acting. She was an actress and director of plays. She was the manager of a theater production company that put on The Vagina Monologues.

In 2001, she met her current husband, entertainment journalist Alexis Puig, through friends while studying at the Cinema Institute in Barcelona. Eight months later they were married in Buenos Aires. Alexis has a daughter, Victoria, from a previous relationship.

In Argentina, Cordero first worked for EWTN, the Catholic channel of the United States. She was casting director for a translation of the rosary which was filmed in the Holy Land. She performed Spanish-language dubbing for Internet courses and lent her voice to the role of Queen Isabella during the 2004 Congreso de la Lengua which was held in Rosario.

In 2005, she met the Argentine entertainment journalist Beto Casella, who invited her to take part in his radio show Bien levantado as a panelist. She is still on the entertainment and news program.

In 2007 and 2008, she worked on the debate portion of Gran Hermano (Argentina's edition of Big Brother).

In August 2008, Cordero gave birth to her first daughter, Lara. Her godparents are journalist Guillermo Andino (chosen by Alexis, his co-worker) and Carmela Bárbaro, whom Lola met on Bien levantado.

From 2008 to 2010, Cordero worked on Intrusos en el espectáculo, ending when she became pregnant and decided to temporarily retire from the show. Her place is currently occupied by Marcela Baños.

In 2009, she got her first role as a presenter on Telefe's Alguien a quien querer, a program where she was assisting one person and there were three women or men pre-selected, so that the person finally had the chance to meet and choose one of them.

In January 2011, her second daughter, Eva, was born. The girl's godparents are presenter Marisa Brel, whom Lola met on Gran Hermano, and journalist Gustavo Sylvestre.

Cordero currently works as a panelist on the daily program Bendita, hosted by Beto Casella. She joined it in 2012.

Since 2014, she has worked as an announcer and journalist from 6:00 am to 9:00 am on Radio 10's Levantado de 10, together with Beto Casella.

== Television ==
Year	Country	Title	Channel	Role	Notes
2007–2008	(Argentina)	Bendita	Canal 9	Panelist	
2007	(Argentina)	Gran Hermano	Telefe	Panelist	
2007–2008	(Argentina)	Por qué no te callas...?	Telefe	Panelist	
2008–2010	(Argentina)	Intrusos en el espectáculo	América TV	Panelist	
2009	(Argentina)	Alguien a quien querer	Telefe	Presenter	
2012 – present	(Argentina)	Bendita	Canal 9	Panelist	
2013–2014	(Argentina)	El Chimentero 3.0	Magazine	Panelist	

== Radio ==
Year	Country	Program	Station	Notes
2014 – present	(Argentina)	Levantado de 10 (2014–2016); Mañana Syvestre (2016 – present)	Radio 10 (2014–)	
2005 – present	(Argentina)	Bien levantado	Mega 98.3 (2005–2008); Pop Radio (2009–)	
2007	(Argentina)	Conexión Pop	Pop Radio	
