= Tamara Paganini =

Argentine dancer and actress (born 1974)

Tamara Paganini (Spanish pronunciation: [taˈmaɾa paɣaˈnini]; born February 11, 1974) is an Argentine dancer and actress.

== Early show business career ==
Paganini began her show business career as a young stripper. She was signed by television producer Gerardo Sofovich and made her television debut in 2001's "Gran Hermano", which is Argentina's name for the "Big Brother" television show. Paganini spoke about many issues considered by some in Latin American culture to be taboo during her stay on the reality show; this made her popularity grow among Argentine television viewers.

== Career as an actress ==
Paganini next made her acting debut in a Jorge Rial's television series named "Intrusos en el espectáculo" ("Intruders at the Show"), playing a dancer. She returned to Big Brother soon after, participating in "Gran Hermano 2".

Paganini took theater classes, and she landed a role in a Broadway play. Eventually, she worked on a play named "¡Soltero... y con dos Viudas!" ("Single... and With two Widows!!"), which became a large hit in Argentina. Because she substituted Ximena Capristo in that play, rumors about a rivalry between the two stars began surfacing on the Argentine press.

== Rumors of return to stripping ==
In April 2003, Paganini was seen visiting a strip club in the province of Cordoba. She admittedly got on the stage and performed a stripping act for the present public and, according to the local press, was offered as much as $7,000 US dollars to return to stripping, but she ultimately refused the offer, saying she had no interest in returning to that profession and wanted to go ahead with her acting career.
