= List of Gran Hermano (Argentine TV series) episodes =

Argentine reality TV show

Gran Hermano is the Argentine version of the international reality television franchise Big Brother produced by Endemol. The show is currently hosted by Santiago del Moro, taking over after Jorge Rial and previously Soledad Silveyra. The show first aired on 10 March 2001 on Telefe and aired seven regular and one Celebrity season until 16 April 2012. It was on hiatus for three years until 29 April 2015, when a revival of the series began airing on América TV for two seasons until 24 August 2016. After a six-year break, the show returned to Telefe for its tenth season that premiered on 17 October 2022.

The show features contestants called "HouseGuests" who live together in a specially constructed house that is isolated from the outside world, and the housemates are continuously monitored during their stay in the house by live television cameras as well as personal audio microphones. Throughout the course of the competition, they are voted out (usually on a weekly basis) until only one remains and wins the cash prize.

As of 17 September 2026, 501 episodes of Gran Hermano have aired, concluding the thirteenth season.

== Series overview ==
Series	Episodes	Originally released			Avg. rating
Series	Episodes	First released	Last released	Network	Avg. rating
1	18	10 March 2001	30 June 2001	Telefe	26.9
2	18	4 August 2001	1 December 2001	Telefe	23.2
3	18	15 October 2002	16 February 2003	Telefe	21.3
4	34	9 January 2007	7 May 2007	Telefe	28.2
Famosos	24	13 May 2007	1 August 2007	Telefe	19.5
5	35	8 August 2007	2 December 2007	Telefe	16.6
6	39	12 December 2010	1 May 2011	Telefe	20.7
7	52	2 November 2011	16 April 2012	Telefe	11.3
8	24	29 April 2015	30 September 2015	América	8.1
9	15	18 May 2016	24 August 2016	América	7.4
10	49	17 October 2022	27 March 2023	Telefe	20.2
11	65	11 December 2023	7 July 2024	Telefe	17.2
12	64	2 December 2024	25 June 2025	Telefe	12.7
13	68	23 February 2026	16 September 2026	Telefe	TBA

== Episodes ==
=== Season 1 (2001) ===
No. overall	No. in season	Title	Day(s)	Original release date	HH rating (Note: Audience averages are measured only in the Greater Buenos Aires area, according to data from Kantar Ibope Media.)
1	1	"Premiere"	Day 1	10 March 2001	14.8
2	2	"1st Nomination Gala"	Days 1–8	17 March 2001	15.1
3	3	"1st Eviction Gala"	Days 9–15	24 March 2001	22.1
4	4	"2nd Nomination Gala"	Days 16–22	31 March 2001	28.3
5	5	"2nd Eviction Gala"	Days 23–29	7 April 2001	21.9
6	6	"3rd Nomination Gala"	Days 30–36	14 April 2001	30.1
7	7	"3rd Eviction Gala"	Days 37–43	21 April 2001	29.9
8	8	"4th Nomination Gala"	Days 44–50	28 April 2001	29.7
9	9	"4th Eviction Gala"	Days 51–57	5 May 2001	30.0
10	10	"5th Nomination Gala"	Days 58–64	12 May 2001	31.0
11	11	"5th Eviction Gala"	Days 65–71	19 May 2001	29.5
12	12	"6th Nomination Gala"	Days 72–78	26 May 2001	26.0
13	13	"6th Eviction Gala"	Days 79–85	2 June 2001	29.5
14	14	"7th Nomination Gala"	Days 86–92	9 June 2001	28.0
15	15	"7th Eviction Gala"	Days 93–99	16 June 2001	27.0
16	16	"8th Nomination Gala"	Days 100–103	20 June 2001	27.2
17	17	"8th Eviction Gala"	Days 104–106	23 June 2001	28.4
18	18	"Final Gala"	Days 107–113 Various (Note: In the final episode, the HouseGuests that made it to the finale looked back over their time in the house. Flashbacks included clips from previous days in the house.)	30 June 2001	36.1

=== Season 2 (2001) ===
No. overall	No. in season	Title	Day(s)	Original release date	HH rating
19	1	"Premiere"	Day 1	4 August 2001	23.1
20	2	"1st Nomination Gala"	Days 1–8	11 August 2001	23.0
21	3	"1st Eviction Gala"	Days 9–15	18 August 2001	22.0
22	4	"2nd Nomination Gala"	Days 16–22	25 August 2001	20.0
23	5	"2nd Eviction Gala"	Days 23–29	1 September 2001	21.0
24	6	"3rd Nomination Gala"	Days 30–36	8 September 2001	23.3
25	7	"3rd Eviction Gala"	Days 37–43	15 September 2001	24.3
26	8	"4th Nomination Gala"	Days 44–50	22 September 2001	23.4
27	9	"4th Eviction Gala"	Days 51–57	29 September 2001	22.0
28	10	"5th Nomination Gala"	Days 58–64	6 October 2001	24.0
29	11	"5th Eviction Gala"	Days 65–71	13 October 2001	25.0
30	12	"6th Nomination & Entry Gala"	Days 72–78	20 October 2001	25.0
31	13	"6th Eviction & 7th Nomination Gala"	Days 79–83	25 October 2001	25.0
32	14	"7th Eviction Gala"	Days 84–92	3 November 2001	23.1
33	15	"8th Nomination Gala"	Days 93–99	10 November 2001	20.2
34	16	"8th Eviction & 9th Nomination Gala"	Days 100–106	17 November 2001	22.3
35	17	"9th Eviction Gala"	Days 107–113	24 November 2001	21.0
36	18	"Final Gala"	Days 113–119 Various	1 December 2001	29.7

=== Season 3 (2002) ===
No. overall	No. in season	Title	Day(s)	Original release date	HH rating
37	1	"Premiere"	Day 1	15 October 2002	26.9
38	2	"1st Nomination Gala"	Days 1–8	22 October 2002	17.7
39	3	"1st Eviction Gala"	Days 9–15	29 October 2002	20.8
40	4	"2nd Nomination Gala"	Days 16–22	5 November 2002	30.8
41	5	"2nd Eviction Gala"	Days 23–29	12 November 2002	22.3
42	6	"3rd Nomination & Re-Entry Gala"	Days 30–36	19 November 2002	15.4
43	7	"3rd Eviction Gala"	Days 37–43	26 November 2002	23.0
44	8	"4th Nomination Gala"	Days 44–50	3 December 2002	13.2
45	9	"4th Eviction Gala"	Days 51–57	10 December 2002	24.9
46	10	"5th Nomination Gala"	Days 58–65	18 December 2002	22.2
47	11	"5th Eviction Gala"	Days 66–72	25 December 2002	23.1
48	12	"6th Nomination Gala"	Days 73–79	1 January 2003	19.1
49	13	"6th Eviction Gala"	Days 80–85	7 January 2003	21.4
50	14	"7th Nomination Gala"	Days 86–97	19 January 2003	16.8
51	15	"7th Eviction Gala"	Days 98–104	26 January 2003	17.3
52	16	"8th Nomination Gala"	Days 105–111	2 February 2003	19.6
53	17	"8th Eviction Gala"	Days 112–118	9 February 2003	18.9
54	18	"Final Gala"	Days 119–125 Various	16 February 2003	29.2

=== Season 4 (2007) ===
No. overall	No. in season	Title	Day(s)	Original release date	HH rating
55	1	"Premiere"	Day 1	9 January 2007	24.9
56	2	"1st Nomination Gala"	Days 1–4	12 January 2007	20.5
57	3	"1st Eviction Gala"	Days 5–8	16 January 2007	18.8
58	4	"2nd Nomination Gala"	Days 9–10	18 January 2007	21.6
59	5	"2nd Eviction Gala"	Days 11–15	23 January 2007	25.3
60	6	"3rd Nomination Gala"	Days 16–17	25 January 2007	25.6
61	7	"3rd Eviction Gala"	Days 18–21	29 January 2007	26.6
62	8	"4th Nomination Gala"	Days 22–24	1 February 2007	21.9
63	9	"4th Eviction Gala"	Days 25–28	5 February 2007	27.0
64	10	"5th Nomination Gala"	Days 29–31	8 February 2007	28.7
65	11	"5th Eviction Gala"	Days 32–35	12 February 2007	27.5
66	12	"6th Nomination Gala"	Days 36–38	15 February 2007	29.0
67	13	"6th Eviction Gala"	Days 39–42	19 February 2007	30.0
68	14	"7th Nomination Gala"	Days 43–45	22 February 2007	28.2
69	15	"7th Eviction Gala"	Days 46–49	26 February 2007	30.2
70	16	"8th Nomination Gala"	Days 50–52	1 March 2007	30.7
71	17	"8th Eviction Gala"	Days 53–56	5 March 2007	30.7
72	18	"9th Nomination Gala"	Days 57–59	8 March 2007	28.4
73	19	"9th Eviction Gala"	Days 60–63	12 March 2007	29.2
74	20	"Re-Entry Gala"	Days 64–66	15 March 2007	32.7
75	21	"10th Nomination Gala"	Days 67–70	19 March 2007	30.2
76	22	"10th Eviction Gala"	Days 71–73	22 March 2007	29.5
77	23	"11th Nomination Gala"	Days 74–77	26 March 2007	29.9
78	24	"11th Eviction Gala"	Days 78–80	29 March 2007	30.7
79	25	"12th Nomination Gala"	Days 81–84	2 April 2007	28.9
80	26	"12th Eviction Gala"	Days 85–91	9 April 2007	28.4
81	27	"13th Nomination Gala"	Days 92–94	12 April 2007	27.7
82	28	"13th Eviction Gala"	Days 95–98	16 April 2007	29.2
83	29	"14th Nomination Gala"	Days 99–101	19 April 2007	27.6
84	30	"14th Eviction Gala"	Days 102–105	23 April 2007	28.2
85	31	"15th Nomination Gala"	Days 106–108	26 April 2007	30.3
86	32	"15th Eviction Gala"	Days 109–113	1 May 2007	34.6
87	33	"Fourth Place Eviction Gala"	Days 114–115 Various	3 May 2007	28.2
88	34	"Final Gala"	Days 116–119 Various	7 May 2007	39.1

=== Famosos (2007) ===
No. in season	Title	Day(s)	Original release date	HH rating
1	"Premiere"	Day 1	13 May 2007	35.2
2	"1st Nomination Gala"	Days 1–6	18 May 2007	21.5
3	"1st Eviction Gala"	Days 7–8	20 May 2007	25.0
4	"2nd Nomination Gala"	Days 9–12	24 May 2007	22.5
5	"2nd Eviction Gala"	Days 13–15	27 May 2007	25.3
6	"3rd Nomination Gala"	Days 16–19	31 May 2007	22.8
7	"3rd Eviction Gala"	Days 20–24	4 June 2007	19.1
8	"4th Nomination Gala"	Days 25–27	7 June 2007	17.1
9	"4th Eviction Gala"	Days 28–31	11 June 2007	18.9
10	"5th Nomination Gala"	Days 32–34	14 June 2007	21.6
11	"5th Eviction Gala"	Days 35–38	18 June 2007	17.9
12	"6th Nomination Gala"	Days 39–41	21 June 2007	18.8
13	"6th Eviction Gala"	Days 42–45	25 June 2007	19.6
14	"7th Nomination Gala"	Days 46–48	28 June 2007	11.4
15	"7th Eviction Gala"	Days 49–51	1 July 2007	18.9
16	"8th Nomination Gala"	Days 52–54	4 July 2007	16.8
17	"8th Eviction Gala"	Days 55–59	9 July 2007	17.2
18	"9th Nomination Gala"	Days 60–62	12 July 2007	18.5
19	"9th Eviction Gala"	Days 63–66	16 July 2007	16.4
20	"10th Nomination Gala"	Days 67–69	19 July 2007	17.5
21	"10th Eviction Gala"	Days 70–73	23 July 2007	18.3
22	"Special Gala"	Days 74–76	26 July 2007	9.8
23	"Fourth Place Eviction Gala"	Days 77–80 Various	30 July 2007	20.5
24	"Final Gala"	Days 81–82 Various	1 August 2007	28.4

=== Season 5 (2007) ===
No. overall	No. in season	Title	Day(s)	Original release date	HH rating
89	1	"Premiere"	Day 1	8 August 2007	24.1
90	2	"1st Nomination Gala"	Days 1–3	10 August 2007	13.8
91	3	"1st Eviction Gala"	Days 4–6	13 August 2007	16.3
92	4	"2nd Nomination Gala"	Days 7–9	16 August 2007	14.9
93	5	"2nd Eviction Gala"	Days 10–13	20 August 2007	15.3
94	6	"3rd Nomination Gala"	Days 14–15	22 August 2007	15.5
95	7	"3rd Eviction Gala"	Days 16–19	26 August 2007	18.9
96	8	"4th Nomination Gala"	Days 20–22	29 August 2007	15.8
97	9	"4th Eviction Gala"	Days 23–26	2 September 2007	19.5
98	10	"5th Nomination Gala"	Days 27–29	5 September 2007	16.9
99	11	"5th Eviction Gala"	Days 30–33	9 September 2007	16.1
100	12	"6th Nomination Gala"	Days 34–36	12 September 2007	18.9
101	13	"6th Eviction Gala"	Days 37–40	16 September 2007	18.5
102	14	"7th Nomination Gala"	Days 41–43	19 September 2007	17.3
103	15	"7th Eviction & HouseGuests Entry Gala"	Days 44–47	23 September 2007	17.4
104	16	"8th Nomination Gala"	Days 48–50	26 September 2007	15.1
105	17	"8th Eviction"	Days 51–54	30 September 2007	17.7
106	18	"9th Nomination Gala"	Days 55–57	3 October 2007	19.4
107	19	"9th Eviction"	Days 58–61	7 October 2007	17.1
108	20	"10th Nomination Gala"	Days 62–64	10 October 2007	17.4
109	21	"10th Eviction"	Days 65–68	14 October 2007	14.1
110	22	"11th Nomination Gala"	Days 69–71	17 October 2007	15.8
111	23	"11th Eviction"	Days 72–75	21 October 2007	15.3
112	24	"Exchange Gala"	Day 78	24 October 2007	16.1
113	25	"Special Gala"	Day 82	28 October 2007	14.1
114	26	"12th Nomination Gala"	Days 76–85	31 October 2007	14.4
115	27	"12th Eviction Gala"	Days 86–89	4 November 2007	16.6
116	28	"13th Nomination Gala"	Days 90–92	7 November 2007	19.1
117	29	"13th Eviction Gala"	Days 93–96	11 November 2007	15.3
118	30	"14th Nomination Gala"	Days 97–99	14 November 2007	14.2
119	31	"14th Eviction Gala"	Days 100–103	18 November 2007	14.5
120	32	"15th Nomination Gala"	Days 104–106	21 November 2007	14.2
121	33	"15th Eviction Gala"	Days 107–110	25 November 2007	14.8
122	34	"Fourth Place Eviction Gala"	Days 111–113 Various	28 November 2007	16.7
123	35	"Final Gala"	Days 114–117 Various	2 December 2007	20.4

=== Season 6 (2010–11) ===
No. overall	No. in season	Title	Day(s)	Original release date	HH rating
124	1	"Premiere"	Day 1	12 December 2010	23.9
125	2	"1st Nomination Gala"	Days 2–8	19 December 2010	19.3
126	3	"1st Eviction Gala"	Days 9–15	26 December 2010	16.0
127	4	"2nd Nomination Gala"	Days 16–19	30 December 2010	17.1
128	5	"2nd Eviction Gala"	Days 20–22	2 January 2011	21.3
129	6	"3rd Nomination Gala"	Days 23–26	6 January 2011	19.6
130	7	"3rd Eviction Gala"	Days 27–29	9 January 2011	18.2
131	8	"4th Nomination Gala"	Days 30–33	13 January 2011	17.7
132	9	"4th Eviction Gala"	Days 34–36	16 January 2011	20.4
133	10	"5th Nomination Gala"	Days 37–41	21 January 2011	18.2
134	11	"5th Eviction Gala"	Days 42–43	23 January 2011	20.0
135	12	"6th Nomination Gala"	Days 44–48	28 January 2011	17.4
136	13	"6th Eviction Gala"	Days 49–50	30 January 2011	20.4
137	14	"7th Nomination Gala"	Days 51–55	4 February 2011	17.6
138	15	"7th Eviction Gala"	Days 56–57	6 February 2011	18.9
139	16	"8th Nomination Gala"	Days 58–62	11 February 2011	22.3
140	17	"8th Eviction Gala"	Days 63–64	13 February 2011	25.9
141	18	"9th Nomination Gala"	Days 65–69	18 February 2011	22.0
142	19	"9th Eviction Gala"	Days 70–71	20 February 2011	23.0
143	20	"10th Nomination Gala"	Days 72–76	25 February 2011	20.9
144	21	"10th Eviction Gala"	Days 77–78	27 February 2011	20.8
145	22	"11th Nomination Gala"	Days 79–83	4 March 2011	20.1
146	23	"11th Eviction Gala"	Days 84–85	6 March 2011	19.8
147	24	"12th Nomination Gala"	Days 86–90	11 March 2011	19.6
148	25	"12th Eviction Gala"	Days 91–92	13 March 2011	21.3
149	26	"13th Nomination Gala"	Days 93–97	18 March 2011	19.9
150	27	"13th Eviction Gala"	Days 98–99	20 March 2011	20.9
151	28	"14th Nomination Gala"	Days 100–104	25 March 2011	19.7
152	29	"14th Eviction Gala"	Days 105–106	27 March 2011	25.7
153	30	"15th Nomination Gala"	Days 107–111	1 April 2011	22.0
154	31	"15th Eviction Gala"	Days 112–113	3 April 2011	21.1
155	32	"16th Nomination Gala"	Days 114–118	8 April 2011	22.4
156	33	"16th Eviction Gala"	Days 119–120	10 April 2011	21.1
157	34	"17th Nomination Gala"	Days 121–125	15 April 2011	22.4
158	35	"17th Eviction Gala"	Days 126–127	17 April 2011	22.9
159	36	"1st Special Gala"	Days 128–132	22 April 2011	16.0
160	37	"2nd Special Gala"	Days 133–134	24 April 2011	17.0
161	38	"Fourth Place Eviction Gala"	Days 135–139 Various	29 April 2011	22.7
162	39	"Final Gala"	Days 140–141 Various	1 May 2011	31.4

=== Season 10 (2022–23) ===
No. overall	No. in season	Title	Day(s)	Original release date	HH rating (Note: Audience averages are measured only in the Greater Buenos Aires area, according to data from Kantar Ibope Media.)
254	1	"Premiere"	Day 1	17 October 2022	21.5
255	2	"1st Nomination Gala"	Days 1–3	19 October 2022	20.1
256	3	"1st Eviction Gala"	Days 4–7	23 October 2022	19.5
257	4	"2nd Nomination Gala"	Days 8–10	26 October 2022	17.9
258	5	"2nd Eviction Gala"	Days 11–14	30 October 2022	18.6
259	6	"3rd Nomination Gala"	Days 15–17	2 November 2022	20.0
260	7	"3rd Eviction Gala"	Days 18–21	6 November 2022	21.1
261	8	"4th Nomination Gala"	Days 22–24	9 November 2022	21.7
262	9	"4th Eviction Gala"	Days 25–28	13 November 2022	21.3
263	10	"5th Nomination Gala"	Days 29–31	16 November 2022	21.7
264	11	"5th Eviction Gala"	Days 32–35	20 November 2022	20.4
265	12	"6th Nomination Gala"	Days 36–38	23 November 2022	21.3
266	13	"6th Eviction Gala"	Days 39–42	27 November 2022	21.4
267	14	"7th Nomination Gala"	Days 43–45	30 November 2022	19.3
268	15	"7th Eviction Gala"	Days 46–49	4 December 2022	20.1
269	16	"8th Nomination Gala"	Days 50–52	7 December 2022	18.6
270	17	"8th Eviction Gala"	Days 53–56	11 December 2022	22.2
271	18	"9th Nomination Gala"	Days 57–59	14 December 2022	20.1
272	19	"HouseGuests Entry Gala"	Day 60	15 December 2022	21.6
273	20	"9th Eviction Gala"	Days 60–64	19 December 2022 (Note: Originally scheduled to air on 18 December 2022. However, it was pre-empted for the 2022 FIFA World Cup final celebrations and rescheduled to 19 December.)	20.7
274	21	"1st Re-Entry Gala"	Days 65–66	21 December 2022	20.8
275	22	"2nd Re-Entry Gala"	Days 67–71	26 December 2022	20.6
276	23	"10th Nomination Gala"	Days 72–73	28 December 2022	21.4
277	24	"10th Eviction Gala"	Days 74–77	1 January 2023	19.0
278	25	"11th Nomination Gala"	Days 78–80	4 January 2023	21.1
279	26	"11th Eviction Gala"	Days 81–85	9 January 2023	22.4
280	27	"12th Nomination Gala"	Days 86–87	11 January 2023	19.8
281	28	"12th Eviction Gala"	Days 88–91	15 January 2023	20.9
282	29	"13th Nomination Gala"	Days 92–95	19 January 2023 (Note: Originally scheduled to air on 18 January 2023. However, it was pre-empted due to a television workers' union strike and rescheduled to 19 January.)	21.9
283	30	"13th Eviction Gala"	Days 96–98	22 January 2023	20.3
284	31	"14th Nomination Gala"	Days 99–101	25 January 2023	21.8
285	32	"14th Eviction Gala"	Days 102–105	29 January 2023	20.4
286	33	"15th Nomination Gala"	Days 106–108	1 February 2023	20.8
287	34	"15th Eviction Gala"	Days 109–112	5 February 2023	22.3
288	35	"16th Nomination Gala"	Days 113–115	8 February 2023	21.9
289	36	"16th Eviction Gala"	Days 116–119	12 February 2023	22.6
290	37	"17th Nomination Gala"	Days 120–122	15 February 2023	22.2
291	38	"17th Eviction Gala"	Days 123–126	19 February 2023	19.6
292	39	"Visitors Entry Gala"	Day 127	20 February 2023	20.1
293	40	"Visitors 1st Eviction Gala"	Days 128–129	22 February 2023	20.3
294	41	"Visitors 2nd Eviction Gala"	Days 130–133	26 February 2023	19.6
295	42	"18th Nomination Gala"	Days 134–136	1 March 2023	18.6
296	43	"18th Eviction Gala"	Days 137–140	5 March 2023	20.0
297	44	"19th Nomination Gala"	Days 141–143	8 March 2023	18.9
298	45	"19th Eviction Gala"	Days 144–147	12 March 2023	19.5
299	46	"20th Eviction Gala"	Days 148–154	19 March 2023	21.1
300	47	"Visitors Entry Gala #2"	Day 155	20 March 2023	22.9
301	48	"Special Gala"	Day 161	26 March 2023	20.2
302	49	"Final Gala"	Days 156–162 Various (Note: In the final episode, the HouseGuests that made it to the finale looked back over their time in the house. Flashbacks include clips from previous days in the house.)	27 March 2023	28.5

=== Season 11 (2023–24) ===
No. overall	No. in season	Title	Day(s)	Original release date	HH rating
Week 1
303	1	"Premiere"	Day 1	11 December 2023	20.5
304	2	"1st Nomination Gala"	Days 1–3	13 December 2023	16.4
305	3	"1st Eviction Gala"	Days 4–7	17 December 2023	13.2
Week 2
306	4	"2nd Nomination Gala"	Days 8–10	20 December 2023	13.6
307	5	"2nd Eviction Gala"	Days 11–15	25 December 2023	16.6
Week 3
308	6	"3rd Nomination Gala"	Days 16–17	27 December 2023	16.5
309	7	"3rd Eviction Gala"	Days 18–22	1 January 2024	14.2
Week 4
310	8	"4th Nomination Gala"	Days 23–24	3 January 2024	16.6
311	9	"4th Eviction Gala"	Days 25–28	7 January 2024	16.9
Week 5
312	10	"5th Nomination Gala"	Days 29–31	10 January 2024	15.6
313	11	"5th Eviction Gala"	Days 32–35	14 January 2024	18.2
Week 6
314	12	"6th Nomination Gala"	Days 36–38	17 January 2024	17.8
315	13	"6th Eviction Gala"	Days 39–42	21 January 2024	18.1
Week 7
316	14	"7th Nomination Gala"	Days 43–45	24 January 2024	16.1
317	15	"7th Eviction Gala (Part 1)"	Days 46–49	28 January 2024	17.6
318	16	"7th Eviction Gala (Part 2)"	Days 46–50	29 January 2024	17.3
Week 8
319	17	"8th Nomination Gala"	Days 51–52	31 January 2024	16.8
320	18	"8th Eviction Gala"	Days 53–56	4 February 2024	17.2
Week 9
321	19	"9th Nomination Gala"	Days 57–59	7 February 2024	17.5
322	20	"9th Eviction Gala (Part 1)"	Days 60–63	11 February 2024	13.5
323	21	"9th Eviction Gala (Part 2)"	Days 60–64	12 February 2024	17.7
Week 10
324	22	"10th Nomination Gala"	Days 65–66	14 February 2024	17.9
325	23	"10th Eviction Gala"	Days 67–70	18 February 2024	19.2
Week 11
326	24	"Re-Entry Gala"	Days 71–77	25 February 2024	20.5
Week 12
327	25	"11th Nomination Gala"	Days 78–80	28 February 2024	18.8
328	26	"11th Eviction Gala"	Days 81–84	3 March 2024	21.0
Week 13
329	27	"2nd Re-Entry and New HouseGuests Entry Gala"	Day 85	4 March 2024	21.8
330	28	"12th Nomination Gala"	Days 85–87	6 March 2024	16.9
331	29	"12th Eviction Gala"	Days 88–91	10 March 2024	17.0
Week 14
332	30	"13th Nomination Gala"	Days 92–94	13 March 2024	17.7
333	31	"13th Eviction Gala"	Days 95–98	17 March 2024	18.4
Week 15
334	32	"14th Nomination Gala"	Days 99–101	20 March 2024	18.7
335	33	"14th Eviction Gala"	Days 102–105	24 March 2024	18.7
Week 16
336	34	"15th Nomination Gala"	Days 106–108	27 March 2024	17.5
337	35	"15th Eviction Gala"	Days 109–113	1 April 2024	18.7
Week 17
338	36	"16th Nomination Gala"	Days 114–115	3 April 2024	18.8
339	37	"16th Eviction Gala (Part 1)"	Days 116–119	7 April 2024	18.5
340	38	"16th Eviction Gala (Part 2)"	Days 116–120	8 April 2024	22.3
Week 18
341	39	"17th Nomination Gala"	Days 121–122	10 April 2024	16.1
342	40	"17th Eviction Gala"	Days 123–126	14 April 2024	18.0
Week 19
343	41	"18th Nomination Gala"	Days 127–129	17 April 2024	17.5
344	42	"18th Eviction Gala"	Days 130–133	21 April 2024	17.4
Week 20
345	43	"19th Nomination Gala"	Days 134–135	23 April 2024	17.1
346	44	"19th Eviction Gala"	Days 136–140	28 April 2024	18.5
Week 21
347	45	"20th Nomination Gala"	Days 141–143	1 May 2024	17.3
348	46	"20th Eviction Gala"	Days 144–147	5 May 2024	20.1
Week 22
349	47	"21st Nomination Gala"	Days 148–150	8 May 2024	16.7
350	48	"21st Eviction Gala"	Days 151–154	12 May 2024	19.0
Week 23
351	49	"Visitors 1st Entry Gala"	Day 155	13 May 2024	17.8
352	50	"22nd Nomination Gala"	Days 155–157	15 May 2024	15.3
353	51	"22nd Eviction Gala"	Days 158–161	19 May 2024	18.4
Week 24
354	52	"Visitors' 1st Evicion Gala"	Days 162–164	22 May 2024	15.9
355	53	"Visitors' 2nd Evicion Gala"	Days 165–168	26 May 2024	16.7
Week 25
356	54	"23rd Nomination Gala"	Days 169–171	29 May 2024	17.4
357	55	"23rd Eviction Gala"	Days 172–175	2 June 2024	18.5
Week 26
358	56	"24th Nomination Gala"	Days 176–178	5 June 2024	17.0
359	57	"24th Eviction Gala"	Days 179–182	9 June 2024	20.3
Week 27
360	58	"Visitors 2nd Entry Gala"	Day 183	10 June 2024	16.6
361	59	"25th Nomination Gala"	Days 183–185	12 June 2024	15.3
362	60	"25th Eviction Gala (Part 1)"	Days 186–190	17 June 2024	16.6
363	61	"25th Eviction Gala (Part 2)"	Days 186–191	18 June 2024	18.9
Week 28
364	62	"26th Nomination Gala"	Day 192	19 June 2024	18.2
365	63	"26th Eviction Gala"	Days 193–196	23 June 2024	16.1
Week 29
366	64	"27th Eviction Gala"	Days 197–203	30 June 2024	15.5
Week 30
378	65	"Final Gala"	Days 204–210 Various (Note: In the final episode, the HouseGuests that made it to the finale looked back over their time in the house. Flashbacks include clips from previous days in the house.)	7 July 2024	19.5

=== Season 12 (2024–25) ===
No. overall	No. in season	Title	Day(s)	Original release date	HH rating
Week 1
379	1	"Premiere"	Day 1	2 December 2024	17.5
380	2	"1st Nomination Gala"	Days 1–3	4 December 2024	13.7
381	3	"1st Eviction Gala"	Days 4–8	9 December 2024	14.7
Week 2
382	4	"2nd Nomination Gala"	Days 9–10	11 December 2024	12.8 (part 1) 10.3 (part 2)
383	5	"2nd Eviction Gala"	Days 11–14	15 December 2024	12.7 (part 1) 11.4 (part 2)
Week 3
384	6	"3rd Nomination Gala"	Days 15–17	18 December 2024	11.9 (part 1) 9.9 (part 2)
385	7	"3rd Eviction Gala"	Days 18–21	22 December 2024	12.1 (part 1) 10.3 (part 2)
Week 4
386	8	"4th Eviction Gala (Part 1)"	Days 22–25	26 December 2024	11.8 (part 1) 10.9 (part 2)
387	9	"4th Eviction Gala (Part 2)"	Days 26–28	29 December 2024	12.3 (part 1) 11.2 (part 2)
Week 5
388	10	"4th Nomination Gala"	Days 29–31	1 January 2025	10.3 (part 1) 8.9 (part 2)
389	11	"5th Eviction Gala"	Days 32–35	5 January 2025	14.5 (part 1) 11.4 (part 2)
Week 6
390	12	"5th Nomination Gala"	Days 36–38	8 January 2025	12.4 (part 1) 11.0 (part 2)
391	13	"6th Eviction Gala"	Days 39–42	12 January 2025	11.4 (part 1) 10.8 (part 2)
Week 7
392	13	"6th Nomination Gala"	Days 43–45	15 January 2025	11.8 (part 1) 10.1 (part 2)
393	14	"7th Eviction Gala"	Days 46–49	19 January 2025	11.6 (part 1) 10.8 (part 2)
Week 8
394	15	"7th Nomination Gala"	Days 50–52	22 January 2025	10.5 (part 1) 8.9 (part 2)
395	16	"8th Eviction Gala"	Days 53–56	26 January 2025	10.8 (part 1) 10.8 (part 2)
Week 9
396	17	"9th Eviction Gala"	Days 57–59	29 January 2025	11.7 (part 1) 9.6 (part 2)
397	18	"10th Eviction Gala"	Days 60–63	2 February 2025	11.9 (part 1) 10.0 (part 2)
Week 10
398	19	"8th Nomination Gala"	Days 64–66	5 February 2025	13.9 (part 1) 11.4 (part 2)
399	20	"11th Eviction Gala"	Days 67–70	9 February 2025	13.8 (part 1) 12.4 (part 2)
Week 11
400	21	"HouseGuests Entry Gala"	Day 71	10 February 2025	14.9 (part 1) 11.0 (part 2)
401	22	"9th Nomination Gala"	Days 72–73	12 February 2025	14.4 (part 1) 11.7 (part 2)
402	23	"12th Eviction Gala"	Days 74–77	16 February 2025	14.9 (part 1) 13.8 (part 2)
Week 12
403	24	"13th Eviction Gala (Part 1)"	Days 78–80	19 February 2025	13.2 (part 1) 10.4 (part 2)
404	25	"13th Eviction Gala (Part 2)"	Days 81–84	23 February 2025	13.4 (part 1) 11.7 (part 2)
Week 13
405	26	"10th Nomination Gala"	Days 85–87	26 February 2025	14.9 (part 1) 10.4 (part 2)
406	27	"14th Eviction Gala"	Days 88–92	3 March 2025	14.0 (part 1) 12.5 (part 2)
Week 14
407	28	"HouseGuests Re-Entry Gala (Part 1)"	Days 93–98	9 March 2025	14.0 (part 1) 10.6 (part 2)
408	29	"HouseGuests Re-Entry Gala (Part 2)"	Day 99	10 March 2025	16.7 (part 1) 12.6 (part 2)
Week 15
407	28	"11th Nomination Gala"	Days 100–101	12 March 2025	13.2 (part 1) 10.0 (part 2)
408	29	"15th Eviction Gala"	Days 102–105	16 March 2025	15.1 (part 1) 12.2 (part 2)
Week 16
409	30	"12th Nomination Gala"	Days 106–108	19 March 2025	13.6 (part 1) 10.2 (part 2)
410	31	"16th Eviction Gala"	Days 109–113	24 March 2025	15.8 (part 1) 13.5 (part 2)
Week 17
411	32	"13th Nomination Gala"	Days 114–115	26 March 2025	16.4 (part 1) 13.8 (part 2)
412	33	"17th Eviction Gala (Part 1)"	Days 116–119	30 March 2025	14.2 (part 1) 11.8 (part 2)
413	34	"17th Eviction Gala (Part 2)"	Day 120	31 March 2025	16.0 (part 1) 14.6 (part 2)
Week 18
414	35	"18th Eviction Gala"	Days 121–126	6 April 2025	12.7
Week 19
415	36	"14th Nomination Gala"	Days 127–129	9 April 2025	15.0 (part 1) 12.7 (part 2)
416	37	"19th Eviction Gala"	Days 130–133	13 April 2025	14.3 (part 1) 12.5 (part 2)
Week 20
417	38	"15th Nomination Gala"	Days 134–136	16 April 2025	15.1 (part 1) 12.3 (part 2)
418	39	"20th Eviction Gala"	Days 137–140	20 April 2025	15.3 (part 1) 13.1 (part 2)
Week 21
419	40	"Visitors Entry Gala"	Day 141	21 April 2025	17.5 (part 1) 14.1 (part 2)
420	41	"Visitors' 1st Evicion Gala"	Days 141–143	23 April 2025	14.9 (part 1) 11.6 (part 2)
421	42	"Visitors' 2nd Eviction Gala"	Days 144–147	27 April 2025	15.0 (part 1) 12.5 (part 2)
Week 22
422	43	"16th Nomination Gala"	Days 148–150	30 April 2025	14.2 (part 1) 12.1 (part 2)
423	44	"21st Eviction Gala (Part 1)"	Days 151–154	4 May 2025	15.0 (part 1) 12.6 (part 2)
424	45	"21st Eviction Gala (Part 2)"	Day 155	5 May 2025	16.8 (part 1) 12.7 (part 2)
Week 23
425	46	"22nd Eviction Gala"	Days 156–161	11 May 2025	14.7 (part 1) 12.3 (part 2)
Week 24
426	47	"17th Nomination Gala"	Days 162–163	13 May 2025	14.8 (part 1) 12.0 (part 2)
427	48	"23rd Eviction Gala (Part 1)"	Days 164–168	18 May 2025	14.0 (part 1) 12.6 (part 2)
428	49	"23rd Eviction Gala (Part 2)"	Day 169	19 May 2025	13.0 (part 1) 11.9 (part 2)
Week 25
429	50	"18th Nomination Gala"	Days 170–171	21 May 2025	14.5 (part 1) 11.6 (part 2)
430	51	"24th Eviction Gala (Part 1)"	Days 172–175	25 May 2025	14.0 (part 1) 11.7 (part 2)
431	52	"24th Eviction Gala (Part 2)"	Day 176	26 May 2025	16.7 (part 1) 13.6 (part 2)
Week 26
432	53	"Special Gala"	Days 177–178	28 May 2025	14.1 (part 1) 10.2 (part 2)
433	54	"19th Nomination Gala"	Day 179	29 May 2025	13.2 (part 1) 10.2 (part 2)
434	55	"25th Eviction Gala (Part 1)"	Days 180–182	1 June 2025	13.2 (part 1) 11.2 (part 2)
435	56	"25th Eviction Gala (Part 2)"	Day 183	2 June 2025	15.5 (part 1) 11.1 (part 2)
Week 27
436	57	"20th Nomination Gala"	Days 184–185	4 June 2025	13.9 (part 1) 10.2 (part 2)
437	58	"26th Eviction Gala (Part 1)"	Days 186–189	8 June 2025	12.6 (part 1) 11.0 (part 2)
438	59	"26th Eviction Gala (Part 2)"	Day 190	9 June 2025	14.6 (part 1) 12.1 (part 2)
Week 28
439	60	"21st Nomination Gala"	Days 191–192	11 June 2025	13.9 (part 1) 11.6 (part 2)
440	61	"27th Eviction Gala"	Days 193–197	16 June 2025	17.0 (part 1) 13.5 (part 2)
Week 29
441	62	"28th Eviction Gala"	Days 198–199	18 June 2025	14.8 (part 1) 10.9 (part 2)
Week 30
442	63	"29th Eviction Gala"	Days 200–204	23 June 2025	17.8 (part 1) 13.9 (part 2)
443	64	"Final Gala"	Day 205 Various (Note: In the final episode, the HouseGuests that made it to the finale looked back over their time in the house. Flashbacks include clips from previous days in the house.)	24 June 2025	19.8 (part 1) 15.3 (part 2)

=== Season 13 (2026) ===
No. overall	No. in season	Title	Day(s)	Original release date	HH rating (Note: Audience averages are measured only in the Greater Buenos Aires area, according to data from Kantar Ibope Media. Episodes are split into two parts as a business strategy to avoid lowering the final average measurement, allowing the main and most-watched segment to maintain a high audience number compared to the competition.)
Week 1
444	1	"Premiere (Part 1)"	Day 1	23 February 2026	17.0 (part 1) 14.8 (part 2)
445	2	"Premiere (Part 2)"	Day 2	24 February 2026	14.4 (part 1) 13.0 (part 2)
446	3	"1st Nomination Gala"	Days 1–3	25 February 2026	15.4 (part 1) 13.4 (part 2)
447	4	"1st Eviction Gala"	Days 4–8	2 March 2026	14.1 (part 1) 12.4 (part 2)
Week 2
448	5	"2nd Nomination Gala"	Days 9–10	4 March 2026	11.4 (part 1) 10.3 (part 2)
449	6	"2nd Eviction Gala"	Days 11–15	9 March 2026	14.2 (part 1) 11.4 (part 2)
Week 3
450	7	"3rd Eviction Gala (Part 1)"	Days 16–18	12 March 2026	14.1 (part 1) 11.6 (part 2)
451	8	"3rd Eviction Gala (Part 2)"	Days 19–22	16 March 2026	15.4 (part 1) 11.3 (part 2)
Week 4
452	9	"3rd Nomination Gala"	Days 23–24	18 March 2026	14.8 (part 1) 10.2 (part 2)
453	10	"4th Eviction Gala"	Days 25–29	23 March 2026	10.7 (part 1) 8.1 (part 2)
Week 5
454	11	"4th Nomination Gala"	Days 30–31	25 March 2026	12.0 (part 1) 9.5 (part 2)
455	12	"5th Eviction Gala"	Days 32–36	30 March 2026	13.5 (part 1) 10.2 (part 2)
Week 6
456	13	"5th Nomination Gala"	Days 37–38	1 April 2026	12.6 (part 1) 11.0 (part 2)
457	14	"6th Eviction Gala"	Days 39–43	6 April 2026	13.5 (part 1) 10.9 (part 2)
Week 7
458	15	"6th Nomination Gala"	Days 44–45	8 April 2026	13.5 (part 1) 10.4 (part 2)
459	16	"7th Eviction Gala"	Days 46–50	13 April 2026	14.0 (part 1) 10.5 (part 2)
Week 8
460	17	"7th Nomination Gala"	Days 51–52	15 April 2026	11.6 (part 1) 7.6 (part 2)
461	18	"8th Eviction Gala"	Days 53–57	20 April 2026	13.9 (part 1) 10.9 (part 2)
Week 9
462	19	"8th Nomination Gala"	Days 58–59	22 April 2026	13.4 (part 1) 10.2 (part 2)
463	20	"9th Eviction Gala"	Days 60–64	27 April 2026	14.6 (part 1) 10.3 (part 2)
Week 10
464	21	"9th Nomination Gala"	Days 65–66	29 April 2026	13.0 (part 1) 9.9 (part 2)
465	22	"10th Eviction Gala"	Days 67–71	4 May 2026	13.9 (part 1) 10.3 (part 2)
Week 11
466	23	"10th Nomination Gala"	Days 72–73	6 May 2026	13.1 (part 1) 9.6 (part 2)
467	24	"11th Eviction Gala"	Days 74–78	11 May 2026	13.9 (part 1) 10.7 (part 2)
Week 12
468	25	"12th Eviction and 11th Nomination Gala"	Days 79–80	13 May 2026	11.1 (part 1) 9.1 (part 2)
469	26	"13th Eviction Gala"	Days 81–84	17 May 2026	13.4 (part 1) 10.6 (part 2)
Week 13
470	27	"Re-Entry Gala"	Day 87	20 May 2026	12.9 (part 1) 8.9 (part 2)
471	28	"12th Nomination Gala"	Days 85–88	21 May 2026	10.3 (part 1) 7.9 (part 2)
472	29	"14th Eviction Gala"	Days 89–92	25 May 2026	12.3 (part 1) 9.3 (part 2)
Week 14
473	30	"13th Nomination Gala"	Days 93–94	27 May 2026	12.2 (part 1) 8.3 (part 2)
474	31	"15th Eviction Gala"	Days 95–99	1 June 2026	12.7 (part 1) 9.8 (part 2)
Week 15
475	32	"14th Nomination Gala"	Days 100–101	3 June 2026	13.5 (part 1) 11.1 (part 2)
476	33	"16th Eviction Gala"	Days 102–106	8 June 2026	13.1 (part 1) 9.9 (part 2)
Week 16
478	35	"17th Eviction Gala"	Days 107–113	15 June 2026	11.9 (part 1) 8.4 (part 2)
Week 17
479	36	"18th Eviction Gala"	Days 114–120	22 June 2026	12.4 (part 1) 8.7 (part 2)
Week 18
480	37	"15th Nomination Gala"	Days 121–122	24 June 2026	10.7 (part 1) 8.1 (part 2)
481	38	"19th Eviction Gala"	Days 123–127	29 June 2026	11.8 (part 1) 8.9 (part 2)
Week 19
482	49	"20th Eviction Gala"	Days 128–134	6 July 2026	9.3 (part 1) 6.6 (part 2)
Week 20
483	50	"16th Nomination Gala"	Days 135–136	8 July 2026	12.3 (part 1) 9.3 (part 2)
484	51	"21st Eviction Gala"	Days 137–141	13 July 2026	12.6 (part 1) 9.8 (part 2)
Week 21
485	52	"22nd Eviction and 17th Nomination Gala"	Days 142–144	16 July 2026	9.5 (part 1) 7.7 (part 2)
486	53	"23rd Eviction Gala"	Days 145–148	20 July 2026	10.9 (part 1) 9.0 (part 2)
Week 22
487	54	"18th Nomination Gala"	Days 149–150	22 July 2026	9.1 (part 1) 8.9 (part 2)
488	55	"24th Eviction Gala"	Days 151–155	27 July 2026	12.1 (part 1) 10.1 (part 2)
Week 23
489	56	"19th Nomination Gala"	Days 156–157	29 July 2026	10.0 (part 1) 8.3 (part 2)
490	57	"25th Eviction Gala"	Days 158–162	3 August 2026	11.8 (part 1) 9.8 (part 2)
Week 24
491	58	"20th Nomination Gala"	Days 163–164	5 August 2026	11.1 (part 1) 8.7 (part 2)
492	59	"26th Eviction Gala"	Days 165–169	10 August 2026	11.8 (part 1) 8.9 (part 2)
Week 25
493	60	"21st Nomination Gala"	Days 170–171	12 August 2026	11.0 (part 1) 8.0 (part 2)
494	61	"27th Eviction Gala"	Days 172–176	17 August 2026	10.6 (part 1) 8.1 (part 2)
Week 26
495	62	"28th Eviction Gala"	Days 177–183	24 August 2026	10.8
496	63	"29th Eviction Gala"	Days 184–190	31 August 2026	10.7 (part 1) 8.5 (part 2)
Week 27
497	64	"30th Eviction Gala"	Days 191–192	2 September 2026	10.1 (part 1) 7.3 (part 2)
498	65	"31st Eviction Gala"	Days 193–197	7 September 2026	11.0 (part 1) 8.3 (part 2)
Week 28
499	66	"32nd Eviction Gala"	Days 198–199	9 September 2026	11.5 (part 1) 8.6 (part 2)
500	67	"Third Place Eviction Gala"	Days 200–204	14 September 2026	11.6 (part 1) 7.9 (part 2)
Week 29
501	68	"Final Gala"	Days 205–206 Various (Note: In the final episode, the HouseGuests that made it to the finale looked back over their time in the house. Flashbacks include clips from previous days in the house.)	16 September 2026	12.5 (part 1) 9.2 (part 2)
