= Marianela Mirra =

Argentine television personality

Marianela Mirra (tucuman, Argentina, February 14, 1984) is an Argentine reality TV participant and TV personality. She won Argentina's version of Big Brother, Gran Hermano.

== History ==
She was born in Córdoba, Argentina on February 14, 1984 and moved to San Miguel de Tucumán at age of two, but now lives in Buenos Aires, where she studies law. She has also worked on El Debate as an analyst with Mariano Peluffo.

Her way through Gran Hermano was extremely controversial, and indeed divided the audience. However, she ended up winning with more than 1,500,000 votes. The show finale set a record in audience for 2007, and was the most watched show (national television) of the decade. She was a polemic participant on the show and her decisions were highly criticized.

She participated in Bailando por un Sueño 2008 (the Argentine version of Dancing with the Stars). Also, she worked in "El Debate" as an analyst of Gran Hermano's last edition, with Mariano Peluffo.

In 2025, she made public her relationship with the former governor of Tucumán, José Alperovich.

== Abstract ==
Year	Title	Role	Notes
2007	Gran Hermano 4	Housemate	Winner
2008	Bailando por un Sueño 2008	Competitor with Carlos Cruz	10th elimanted
