= Bendita =

Argentine television series

Bendita (Spanish: Sacred), formerly Bendita TV, is an Argentine talk show, aired by Canal 9. It is hosted by Beto Casella. Journalist Lola Cordero is a regular panelist.

== Awards ==
- 2013 Tato Awards for best TV programs of spectacles.
