= Gran Hermano (Argentine TV series) =

- Genre: Reality television
- Based on: Big Brother by John de Mol Jr.
- Presented by: Soledad Silveyra (2001–02); Jorge Rial (2007, 2010–12, 2015–16); Mariano Peluffo (2012); Santiago del Moro (2022–present)
- Country of origin: Argentina
- Original language: Spanish
- No. of seasons: 13 + 1 (Celebrity)
- No. of episodes: 501 (list of episodes)

Production
- Production companies: Endemol (2001–12); Endemol Shine Group (2015–16); Banijay (2022–present); Kuarzo Entertainment Argentina (2022–present)

Original release
- Network: Telefe (seasons 1–7; 10–present); América TV (seasons 8–9)
- Release: 10 March 2001 – present

Gran Hermano is the Argentine version of the international reality television franchise Big Brother produced by Endemol. The show is currently hosted by Santiago del Moro, taking over after Jorge Rial and previously Soledad Silveyra. The show first aired on 10 March 2001 on Telefe and aired seven regular and one Celebrity season until 16 April 2012. It was on hiatus for three years until 29 April 2015, when a revival of the series began airing on América TV for two seasons until 24 August 2016. After a six-year break, the show returned to Telefe for its tenth season that premiered on 17 October 2022. Gran Hermano was renewed for an eleventh season on 27 March 2023, a twelfth season on 3 July 2024, a thirteenth season on 22 June 2025, and a fourteenth season on 13 September 2026.

The show features contestants called "HouseGuests" who live together in a specially constructed house that is isolated from the outside world, and the housemates are continuously monitored during their stay in the house by live television cameras as well as personal audio microphones. Throughout the course of the competition, they are voted out (usually on a weekly basis) until only one remains and wins the cash prize.

== History ==
The series was acquired by Telefe in early 2001. The Argentine version of the series officially premiered on 10 March 2001, when the original twelve housemates entered the house. Until its fourth season, the show was hosted by actress Soledad Silveyra, when she was later replaced by Jorge Rial. Rial left the show during season seven, when Mariano Peluffo took over for the remainder of the season. Rial later returned as host for the eighth season when the series moved to América TV. After the return to Telefe for its tenth season, Santiago del Moro was confirmed as the new host. Currently, 11 seasons of the show have aired, along with one Celebrity season, with a renewal for a twelfth season. The show has aired a total of over 300 episodes since it premiered, and there have been a total of 200 HouseGuests competing in the series. Upon entering the house, the HouseGuests must abide by the house rules; HouseGuests can anytime leave the house without permission or be forcibly removed from the game if they broke any rules, such as exhibiting violent and disruptive behavior. In both cases, these HouseGuests are not allowed to return to the house.

== Series overview ==
=== Episodes ===
Series	Episodes	Originally released			Avg. HH rating
Series	Episodes	First released	Last released	Network	Avg. HH rating
1	18	10 March 2001	30 June 2001	Telefe	26.9
2	18	4 August 2001	1 December 2001	Telefe	23.2
3	18	15 October 2002	16 February 2003	Telefe	21.3
4	34	9 January 2007	7 May 2007	Telefe	28.2
GHF	24	13 May 2007	1 August 2007	Telefe	19.5
5	35	8 August 2007	2 December 2007	Telefe	16.6
6	39	12 December 2010	1 May 2011	Telefe	20.7
7	52	2 November 2011	16 April 2012	Telefe	11.3
8	24	29 April 2015	30 September 2015	América	8.1
9	15	18 May 2016	24 August 2016	América	7.4
10	49	17 October 2022	27 March 2023	Telefe	20.2
11	65	11 December 2023	7 July 2024	Telefe	17.2
12	64	2 December 2024	24 June 2025	Telefe	12.9
13	68	23 February 2026	16 September 2026	Telefe	11.4
14	TBA	2027	TBA	Telefe	TBA

=== HouseGuests ===
Season	Days	HouseGuests	Winner	Runner-up	Third place	Other finalist(s)	Prize (ARS)
1	120	14	Marcelo Corazza	Tamara Paganini	Gastón Trezeguet	Daniela Ballester	121,200
2	120	14	Roberto Parra	Silvina Luna	Gustavo Conti	Alejandra Martínez	200,000
3	125	12	Viviana Colmenero	Mauricio Córdoba	Romina Orthusteguy	Matías Bagnato	100,000
4	119	18	Marianela Mirra	Juan Expósito	Mariela Montero	Sebastián Pollastro	100,000
GHF	82	16	Diego Leonardi	Jacqueline Dutrá	Lissa Vera	Fernanda Neil	66,666.66
5	117	20	Esteban Morais	Soledad Melli	Juan Emilio De Antón	Celeste Nicpon	150,000
6	141	22	Cristian Urrizaga	Emiliano Boscatto	Martín Anchorena	Martín Pepa	400,000
7	164	27	Rodrigo Fernández	Walquiria D'Amato	Jorge Apas	Alex Reigenborn	750,000
8	155	18	Francisco Delgado	Matías Schrank	Belén Etchart	Mariano Berón	457,429
9	99	19	Luis Fabián Galesio	Ivana Icardi	Mauricio Guirao	Leandro Robin Yasmila Mendeguía	464,645
10	162	20	Marcos Ginocchio	Juan Ignacio Castañares	Julieta Poggio		19,441,132
11	210	29	Bautista Mascia	Emmanuel Vich	Nicolas Grosman		71,000,000
12	205	35	Santiago Algorta	Ulises Apóstolo	Luz Tito	Eugenia Ruiz	85,004,705
13	206	42	Solange Abraham	Yisela Pintos	Charlotte Caniggia	Luana Fernández Yanina Zilli Mariela Prieto	72,312,456

==== HouseGuests appearing in multiple seasons ====
Contestant(s)	Original season	Finish	Returning season(s)	Finish
Tamara Paganini	Gran Hermano season 1	Runner-up	Gran Hermano: Generación Dorada	8th Place
Eduardo Carrera	Gran Hermano season 3	7th place	Gran Hermano: Generación Dorada	26th Place
Diego Leonardi	Gran Hermano season 4	5th place	Gran Hermano Famosos	Winner
Solange Abraham	Gran Hermano season 6	5th place	Gran Hermano: Generación Dorada	Winner
Emanuel Di Gioia	Gran Hermano season 6	15th place	Gran Hermano: Generación Dorada	15th Place
Marian Farjat	Gran Hermano season 8	6th place	Gran Hermano season 9	16th place
Romina Malaspina	Gran Hermano season 8	9th place	Gran Hermano Dúo 3 (Spain)	5th place
Ivana Icardi	Gran Hermano season 9	Runner-up		
Ivana Icardi	Gran Hermano season 9	Runner-up	Grande Fratello season 16 (Italy)	16th place
Ivana Icardi	Gran Hermano season 9	Runner-up	Gran Hermano Dúo 2 (Spain)	9th place
Constanza Romero	Gran Hermano season 10	14th place	Gran Hermano season 11	12th place
Juliana Scaglione	Gran Hermano season 11	6th place	Gran Hermano season 12	17th place
Catalina Gorostidi	Gran Hermano season 11	15th place	Gran Hermano season 12	13th place
Jennifer Galvarini	Gran Hermano season 1 (Chile)	3rd place	Gran Hermano: Generación Dorada	7th Place
Charlotte Caniggia	Gran Hermano VIP season 4 (Spain)	9th place	Gran Hermano: Generación Dorada	3rd place
Grecia Colmenares	Grande Fratello Season 17 (Italy)	14th Place	Gran Hermano: Generación Dorada	29th Place

== Seasons ==
=== Season 1 (2001) ===
The first season of the reality television series Gran Hermano premiered on 10 March 2001 on Telefe in Argentina, and ended on 30 June 2001 after 120 days of competition. Soledad Silveyra was the host for the season. On the season finale, Marcelo Corazza was crowned the winner defeating runner-up Tamara Paganini with 83.56 percent of the votes by the public, earning a prize of 121,200 Argentine pesos.

==== HouseGuests ====
Name	Age	Residence	Day entered	Day exited	Result
Marcelo Corazza	29	Tigre, Buenos Aires	49	113	Winner
Tamara Paganini	27	San Telmo, Buenos Aires	1	113	Runner-up
Gastón Trezeguet	23	Recoleta, Buenos Aires	1	113	Third Place
Daniela Ballester	24	Mar del Plata, Buenos Aires	22	113	Fourth Place
Santiago Almeyda	26	Buenos Aires	1	106	Evicted
Fernando Navarro	29	Caballito, Buenos Aires	1	99	Evicted
Eleonora González	24	Lomas de Zamora, Buenos Aires	1	85	Evicted
Martín Viaña	25	San Isidro, Buenos Aires	1	71	Evicted
Verónica Zanzul	24	José C. Paz, Buenos Aires	1	57	Evicted
Natalia Fava	28	Mar del Plata, Buenos Aires	1	43	Evicted
Gustavo Jodurcha	30	Quilmes, Buenos Aires	1	43	Walked
Alejandro Restuccia	35	Ituzaingó, Buenos Aires	1	29	Evicted
Patricia Villamea	30	Córdoba, Córdoba	1	15	Walked
Lorena González	30	Río Gallegos, Santa Cruz	1	15	Evicted

==== Voting history ====
HouseGuests nominated for two and one points, shown in descending order in the nomination box. The two or more HouseGuests with the most nomination points faced the public vote.

	Week 2	Week 4	Week 6	Week 8	Week 10	Week 12	Week 14	Week 16	Week 17 Final		Nomination points received
Marcelo	Not in House				Gastón, Santiago	Gastón, Fernando	Tamara, Fernando	Gastón, Santiago	Winner (Day 113)		17
Tamara	Lorena, Fernando	Alejandro, Eleonora	Eleonora, Santiago	Daniela, Santiago	Martín, Fernando	Fernando, Eleonora	Fernando, Marcelo	Marcelo, Daniela	Runner-up (Day 113)		11
Gastón	Lorena; Patricia	Verónica; Alejandro	Verónica, Tamara	Martín, Fernando	Martín, Marcelo	Banned	Marcelo, Daniela	Santiago, Marcelo	Third place (Day 113)		9
Daniela	Not in House			Santiago, Verónica	Santiago, Martín	Eleonora, Fernando	Santiago, Fernando	Santiago, Marcelo	Fourth place (Day 113)		9
Santiago	Lorena, Verónica	Natalia, Fernando	Tamara, Verónica	Fernando, Verónica	Marcelo, Daniela	Daniela, Eleonora	Marcelo, Daniela	Marcelo, Daniela	Evicted (Day 106)		17
Fernando	Lorena, Santiago	Verónica, Natalia	Verónica, Natalia	Verónica, Santiago	Martín, Santiago	Banned	Tamara, Marcelo	Evicted (Day 99)			19
Eleonora	Lorena, Patricia	Alejandro, Natalia	Natalia, Verónica	Verónica, Fernando	Marcelo, Martín	Banned	Evicted (Day 85)				9
Martín	Patricia, Lorena	Natalia, Alejandro	Natalia, Tamara	Fernando, Tamara	Eleonora, Tamara	Evicted (Day 71)					18
Verónica	Lorena, Patricia	Natalia, Fernando	Natalia, Gastón	Martín, Fernando	Evicted (Day 57)						21
Natalia	Lorena, Alejandro	Verónica, Martín	Verónica, Martín	Evicted (Day 43)							16
Gustavo	Lorena, Patricia	Gastón, Alejandro	Martín, Tamara	Walked (Day 43)							3
Alejandro	Lorena, Martín	Gustavo, Natalia	Evicted (Day 29)								8
Patricia	Lorena, Martín	Walked (Day 15)									8
Lorena	Patricia, Gustavo	Evicted (Day 15)									21
Notes	none					1	none		2		
Nominated	Lorena, Patricia	Alejandro, Natalia	Natalia, Verónica	Fernando, Verónica	Marcelo, Martín	Eleonora, Fernando	Fernando, Marcelo, Tamara	Marcelo, Santiago	Daniela, Gastón, Marcelo, Tamara		
Walked	Patricia	none	Gustavo	none							
Evicted	Lorena; 68% to evict	Alejandro; 66% to evict	Natalia; 52% to evict	Verónica; 53% to evict	Martín; 80% to evict	Eleonora; 86% to evict	Fernando; 53% to evict	Santiago; 88% to evict	Daniela; 3.94% to win	Gastón; 4.41% to win	
Evicted	Lorena; 68% to evict	Alejandro; 66% to evict	Natalia; 52% to evict	Verónica; 53% to evict	Martín; 80% to evict	Eleonora; 86% to evict	Fernando; 53% to evict	Santiago; 88% to evict	Tamara; 8.09% to win	Marcelo; 83.56% to win	

===== Notes =====
- ^Note 1: Fernando, Gastón and Eleonora were not allowed to nominate as punishment for discussing nominations.
- ^Note 2: In the final the viewing public were voting for who they wanted to win, not to evict.

=== Season 2 (2001) ===
The second season of the reality television series Gran Hermano premiered on 4 August 2001 on Telefe in Argentina, and ended on 1 December 2001 after 120 days of competition. Soledad Silveyra returned as host. Roberto Parra was crowned the winner defeating runner-up Silvina Luna with 47.14 percent of the votes by the public, earning a prize of 200,000 Argentine pesos.

==== HouseGuests ====
Name	Age	Residence	Day entered	Day exited	Result
Roberto Parra	29	San Fernando, Buenos Aires	30	120	Winner
Silvina Luna	21	Rosario, Santa Fe	85	120	Runner-up
Silvina Luna	21	Rosario, Santa Fe	1	82	Evicted
Gustavo Conti	26	Buenos Aires	1	120	Third Place
Alejandra Martínez	23	Córdoba, Córdoba	1	120	Fourth Place
Javier Aureano	25	Urdampilleta, Buenos Aires	71	113	Evicted
Ximena Capristo	24	Avellaneda, Buenos Aires	1	99	Evicted
Pablo Heredia	21	Buenos Aires	1	83	Walked
Maximiliano Degenaro	25	Caballito, Buenos Aires	71	75	Evicted
Yazmín Schmidt	22	Banfield, Buenos Aires	1	71	Evicted
Gonzalo Novellino	24	Buenos Aires	1	61	Walked
Magaly Rodríguez	22	Mar del Plata, Buenos Aires	1	57	Evicted
Carolina Chiapetta	22	Ezeiza, Buenos Aires	1	43	Evicted
Máximo Sacca	31	Buenos Aires	1	29	Evicted
Luis Biondi	27	Pilar, Buenos Aires	1	15	Evicted

==== Voting history ====
HouseGuests nominated for two and one points, shown in descending order in the nomination box. The two or more HouseGuests with the most nomination points faced the public vote.

	Week 2	Week 4	Week 6	Week 8	Week 10	Week 11	Week 12	Week 14	Week 16	Week 17 Final		Nomination points received
Roberto	Máximo, Magaly	Carolina, Máximo	Carolina, Alejandra	Magaly, Alejandra	Alejandra, Yazmín	Javier	Alejandra, Javier	Alejandra, Javier	Alejandra, Javier	Winner (Day 120)		16
Silvina	Gonzalo, Carolina	Máximo, Carolina	Ximena, Yazmín	Ximena, Alejandra	Alejandra, Ximena	Maximiliano	Ximena, Javier	Ximena, Alejandra	Javier, Alejandra	Runner-up (Day 120)		20
Gustavo	Yazmín, Ximena	Ximena, Máximo	Yazmín, Carolina	Yazmín, Alejandra	Yazmín, Silvina	Javier	Javier, Silvina	Javier, Silvina	Silvina, Javier	Third place (Day 120)		7
Alejandra	Luis, Gonzalo	Máximo, Carolina	Carolina, Magaly	Magaly, Gonzalo	Roberto, Gustavo	Javier	Roberto, Javier	Roberto, Javier	Roberto, Javier	Fourth place (Day 120)		26
Javier	Not in House					Nominated	Pablo, Silvina	Ximena, Alejandra	Roberto, Silvina	Evicted (Day 113)		17
Ximena	Máximo, Luis	Máximo, Carolina	Carolina, Pablo	Magaly, Yazmín	Yazmín, Pablo	Javier	Javier, Silvina	Silvina, Javier	Evicted (Day 99)			38
Pablo	Gonzalo, Yazmín	Silvina, Carolina	Ximena, Silvina	Ximena, Silvina	Silvina, Roberto	Maximiliano	Silvina, Roberto	Walked (Day 83)				6
Maximiliano	Not in House					Nominated	Evicted (Day 75)					0
Yazmín	Luis, Gustavo	Máximo, Alejandra	Ximena, Alejandra	Gustavo, Ximena	Gustavo, Ximena	Evicted (Day 71)						14
Gonzalo	Pablo, Máximo	Alejandra, Máximo	Alejandra, Silvina	Alejandra, Magaly	Walked (Day 61)							7
Magaly	Luis, Roberto	Ximena, Alejandra	Ximena, Roberto	Ximena, Roberto	Evicted (Day 57)							10
Carolina	Luis, Roberto	Ximena, Silvina	Ximena, Gustavo	Evicted (Day 43)								15
Máximo	Ximena, Gonzalo	Ximena, Carolina	Evicted (Day 29)									16
Luis	Ximena, Magaly	Evicted (Day 15)										9
Notes	none		3	none		4	5	none		6		
Nominated	Gonzalo, Luis	Máximo, Ximena	Carolina, Magaly, Ximena	Magaly, Ximena	Alejandra, Yazmín	Javier, Maximiliano	Javier, Silvina	Alejandra, Javier, Ximena	Javier, Roberto	Alejandra, Gustavo, Roberto, Silvina		
Walked	none				Gonzalo	none	Pablo	none				
Evicted	Luis; 77% to evict	Máximo; 69% to evict	Carolina; 65% to evict	Magaly; 74% to evict	Yazmín; 65% to evict	Maximilano; 2 of 6 votes to save	Silvina; 55% to evict	Ximena; 67% to evict	Javier; 77% to evict	Alejandra; 9.21% to win	Gustavo; 18.69% to win	
Evicted	Luis; 77% to evict	Máximo; 69% to evict	Carolina; 65% to evict	Magaly; 74% to evict	Yazmín; 65% to evict	Maximilano; 2 of 6 votes to save	Silvina; 55% to evict	Ximena; 67% to evict	Javier; 77% to evict	Silvina; 24.96% to win	Roberto; 47.14% to win	

===== Notes =====
- ^Note 3: Magaly automatically faced the public vote for discussing Nominations.
- ^Note 4: Javier and Maximiliano entered as substitutes of Gonzalo, but only one of them could stay in the House, the Housemates had to choose either Javier or Maximiliano to stay. Javier received by 4 votes and remained in the House, while Maximiliano was evicted.
- ^Note 5: To choose Pablo's substitute the Phone Lines were opened between all the evicted Housemates, and with more than 80% Silvina returned to the House, meaning that Silvina was only out of the House for little over 3 days.
- ^Note 6: In the final the viewing public votes for who they want to win, not to evict.

==== Repechage ====
After Pablo Heredia decided to leave, Gran Hermano decided that during the debate show after the seventh eviction gala, a repechage would be made for a former participant to return to the house. During the show, by decision of the public, Silvina Luna re-entered the house.

Ex-housemate	Percentage	Result
Silvina Luna	72%	Re-entered; Day 85
Luis Biondi	Unknown	Evicted; Day 85
Yazmín Schmidt	Unknown	Evicted; Day 85
Magaly Rodríguez	Unknown	Evicted; Day 85
Carolina Chiapetta	Unknown	Evicted; Day 85

=== Season 3 (2002–03) ===
The third season of the reality television series Gran Hermano premiered on 15 October 2002 on Telefe in Argentina, and ended on 16 February 2003 after 125 days of competition. Soledad Silveyra returned as host for the last time. Vivana Colmenero was crowned the winner defeating runner-up Mauricio Córdoba with 46.87 percent of the votes by the public, earning a prize of 100,000 Argentine pesos.

Eduardo Carrera was exchanged with Inmaculada González from the fourth season of Gran Hermano Spain for one week.

==== HouseGuests ====
Name	Age	Residence	Day entered	Day exited	Result
Viviana Colmenero	30	Buenos Aires	1	125	Winner
Mauricio Córdoba	23	Buenos Aires	1	125	Runner-up
Romina Orthusteguy	22	Buenos Aires	1	125	Third Place
Matías Bagnato	25	Flores, Buenos Aires	1	125	Fourth Place
Natalia Quintilliano	24	Junín, Buenos Aires	36	118	Evicted
Natalia Quintilliano	24	Junín, Buenos Aires	1	15	Evicted
Pablo Martínez	22	Buenos Aires	1	104	Evicted
Eduardo Carrera	33	Buenos Aires	1	85	Evicted
Carla Bazán	24	Buenos Aires	1	72	Evicted
Diego Torales	29	San Luis, San Luis	1	57	Evicted
Analía Barrios	25	Banfield, Buenos Aires	1	43	Evicted
Sebastián Spur	24	Buenos Aires	1	29	Walked
Fernanda Zapata	31	Tigre, Buenos Aires	1	29	Evicted

==== Voting history ====
On this season, HouseGuests had three votes for nomination until week 12, the first vote for two points and the remaining two for one point, shown in descending order in the nomination box. After week 12 the nominations returned to the original format, with HouseGuests nominating for two and one points. The two or more HouseGuests with the most nomination points faced the public vote.

	Week 2	Week 4	Week 6	Week 8	Week 10	Week 12	Week 14	Week 16	Week 17 Final		Nomination points received
Viviana	Natalia, Diego, Pablo	Diego, Fernanda, Sebastián	Pablo, Analía, Diego	Pablo, Carla, Diego	Natalia, Carla, Pablo	Eduardo, Natalia, Pablo	Romina, Pablo	Natalia, Romina	Winner (Day 125)		46
Mauricio	Pablo, Matías, Sebastián	Fernanda, Diego, Eduardo	Analía, Eduardo, Pablo	Natalia, Diego, Pablo	Natalia, Eduardo, Pablo	Pablo, Eduardo, Natalia	Pablo, Natalia	Natalia, Romina	Runner-up (Day 125)		20
Romina	Analía, Fernanda, Pablo	Fernanda, Pablo, Sebastián	Analía, Carla, Pablo	Natalia, Carla, Pablo	Natalia, Carla, Pablo	Natalia, Matías, Pablo	Natalia, Matías	Matías, Viviana	Third place (Day 125)		15
Matías	Diego, Natalia, Viviana	Analía, Diego, Fernanda	Diego, Analía, Pablo	Diego, Natalia, Pablo	Carla, Natalia, Pablo	Pablo, Eduardo, Natalia	Pablo, Natalia	Natalia, Romina	Fourth Place (Day 125)		22
Natalia	Viviana, Analia, Sebastián	Evicted (Day 15)		Diego, Eduardo, Romina	Eduardo, Matías, Romina	Romina, Eduardo, Matías	Romina, Mauricio	Matías, Viviana	Re-evicted (Day 118)		40
Pablo	Viviana, Mauricio, Natalia	Viviana, Mauricio, Romina	Viviana, Matías, Romina	Viviana, Matías, Mauricio	Viviana, Matías, Mauricio	Viviana, Mauricio, Romina	Viviana, Matías	Evicted (Day 104)			30
Eduardo	Viviana, Mauricio, Natalia	Mauricio, Diego, Fernanda	Diego, Analía, Mauricio	Diego, Mauricio, Natalia	Natalia, Mauricio, Viviana	Natalia, Mauricio, Viviana	Evicted (Day 85)				16
Carla	Viviana, Diego, Natalia	Diego, Fernanda, Sebastián	Diego, Matías, Viviana	Viviana, Matías, Natalia	Matías, Eduardo, Romina	Evicted (Day 72)					9
Diego	Viviana, Carla, Eduardo	Viviana, Analía, Mauricio	Viviana, Eduardo, Matías	Viviana, Eduardo, Matías	Evicted (Day 57)						28
Analia	Viviana, Diego, Eduardo	Matías, Mauricio, Sebastián	Viviana, Matías, Mauricio	Evicted (Day 43)							15
Sebastián	Viviana, Carla, Diego	Analía, Mauricio, Viviana	Walked (Day 29)								7
Fernanda	Mauricio, Natalia, Viviana	Viviana, Mauricio, Sebastián	Evicted (Day 29)								9
Notes	none	7	none	8	none	9	none		10		
Nominated	Natalia, Viviana	Diego, Fernanda, Mauricio, Pablo, Viviana	Analía, Diego, Viviana	Diego, Natalia	Carla, Eduardo, Matías, Natalia, Pablo	Eduardo, Natalia, Pablo	Pablo, Romina	Matías, Natalia	Matías, Mauricio, Romina, Viviana		
Walked	none		Sebastián	none							
Evicted	Natalia; 50.06% to evict	Fernanda; 43% to evict	Analía; 70% to evict	Natalia; 62% to return	Carla; 57% to evict	Eduardo; 53% to evict	Pablo; 53% to evict	Natalia; 64% to evict	Matías; 4.46% to win	Romina; 11.91% to win	
Evicted	Natalia; 50.06% to evict	Fernanda; 43% to evict	Analía; 70% to evict	Diego; 65% to evict	Carla; 57% to evict	Eduardo; 53% to evict	Pablo; 53% to evict	Natalia; 64% to evict	Mauricio; 36.76% to win	Viviana; 46.87% to win	

===== Notes =====
- ^Note 7: Pablo was nominated by Gran Hermano for discussing nominations.
- ^Note 8: Natalia returned to the house as Sebastián's replacement after winning a public vote with 62%.
- ^Note 9: Eduardo was nominated by Gran Hermano for being very aggressive toward Romina.
- ^Note 10: In the final the viewing public votes for who they want to win, not to evict.

==== Repechage ====
After Sebastián Spur decided to leave, Gran Hermano decided that during the third nomination gala, a repechage would be made for a former participant to return to the house. During the show, by decision of the public, Natalia Quintilliano re-entered the house.

Ex-housemate	Percentage	Result
Natalia Quintilliano	65%	Re-entered; Day 36
Fernanda Zapata	35%	Evicted; Day 36

=== Season 4 (2007) ===
The fourth season of the reality television series Gran Hermano premiered on 9 January 2007 on Telefe in Argentina, and ended on 7 May 2007 after 119 days of competition. Jorge Rial was confirmed as the new host. Marianela Mirra was crowned the winner defeating Juan Expósito and Mariela Montero Ríos with 41.46 percent of the votes by the public, earning a prize of 100,000 Argentine pesos.

Pablo Espósito was exchanged with Íris Stefanelli from the seventh season of Big Brother Brasil for six days.

==== HouseGuests ====
Name	Age	Residence	Day entered	Day exited	Result
Marianela Mirra	22	San Miguel de Tucumán, Tucumán	1	119	Winner
Juan Expósito	28	Córdoba, Córdoba	1	119	Runner-up
Mariela Montero	27	Salta, Salta	1	119	Third Place
Sebastián Pollastro	20	Luis Guillón, Buenos Aires	1	115	Fourth Place
Diego Leonardi	28	Caseros, Buenos Aires	1	113	Evicted
Gabriel Lagos	20	San Martín, Mendoza	1	105	Evicted
Claudia Ciardone	27	Loma Hermosa, Buenos Aires	73	98	Evicted
Claudia Ciardone	27	Loma Hermosa, Buenos Aires	1	8	Evicted
Jéssica Gómez	21	Monte Grande, Buenos Aires	1	91	Evicted
Jonathan Diéguez	20	Bernal, Buenos Aires	1	80	Evicted
Griselda Sánchez	22	San José, Mendoza	1	73	Evicted
Leandro Maldonado	21	Loma Hermosa, Buenos Aires	1	63	Evicted
Nadia Epstein	25	Buenos Aires	1	56	Evicted
Pablo Espósito	25	Ramos Mejía, Buenos Aires	1	49	Evicted
Agustín Belforte	28	Rosario, Santa Fe	1	42	Evicted
Silvina Scheffler	26	Colón, Entre Ríos	1	35	Evicted
Damián Fortunato	27	Rosario, Santa Fe	1	28	Evicted
Vanina Gramuglia	27	Quilmes, Buenos Aires	1	21	Evicted
Melisa Durán	22	Florida, Buenos Aires	1	15	Evicted

==== Voting history ====
On this season, the first person to go to the Diary Room to nominate has the option to allocate 3 points and 2 points to their nominees. This is called the "Special Nomination" and must be used before nominations start. All other HouseGuests can assign 2 points and 1 point to their nominees. The first HouseGuest listed received the most points and the second housemate listed received the fewest points.

The HouseGuest that used the Diary Room's Special Nomination is marked in orange.

	Week 1	Week 2	Week 3	Week 4	Week 5	Week 6	Week 7	Week 8	Week 9	Week 10		Week 11	Week 12	Week 13	Week 14	Week 15	Week 16 Final		Nomination points received
	Week 1	Week 2	Week 3	Week 4	Week 5	Week 6	Week 7	Week 8	Week 9	Day 66	Day 70	Week 11	Week 12	Week 13	Week 14	Week 15	Week 16 Final		Nomination points received
Marianela	Griselda, Melisa	Griselda, Melisa	Damián, Griselda	Damián, Griselda	Nadia, Agustín	Nadia, Sebastián	Nadia, Griselda	Nadia, Griselda	~~Griselda,~~; ~~Sebastián~~	Claudia, Vanina	Griselda, Sebastián	Gabriel, Jonathan	Jéssica, Gabriel	Juan, Gabriel	Juan, Gabriel	Diego, Juan	Winner (Day 119)		65
Juan	Refused	Nadia, Marianela	Vanina, Damián	Marianela, Damián	Refused	Pablo, Gabriel	Marianela, Pablo	Gabriel, Jéssica	Diego, Gabriel	Claudia, Leandro	Gabriel, Diego	Jonathan, Sebastián	Jessica, Gabriel	Diego, Juan	Refused	Refused	Runner-up (Day 119)		25
Mariela	Claudia, Marianela	Gabriel, Leandro	Vanina, Silvina	Silvina, Gabriel	Silvina, Leandro	Pablo, Agustín	Pablo, Jonathan	Nadia, Griselda	Griselda, Jonathan	Claudia, Leandro	Griselda, Gabriel	Jonathan, Gabriel	Jessica, Sebastián	Gabriel, Sebastián	Gabriel, Sebastián	Sebastián, Diego	Third place (Day 119)		73
Sebastián	Diego, Gabriel	Pablo, Juan	Marianela, Vanina	Pablo, Marianela	Pablo, Silvina	Pablo, Gabriel	Marianela, Pablo	Leandro, Mariela	Mariela, Leandro	Claudia, Nadia	Mariela, Diego	Mariela, Claudia	Mariela, Claudia	Claudia, Mariela	Mariela, Juan	Mariela, Juan	Evicted (Day 115)		26
Diego	Silvina, Pablo	Silvina, Griselda	Marianela, Silvina	Silvina, Jonathan	Leandro, Silvina	Pablo, Griselda	Jonathan, Pablo	Sebastián, Jonathan	Sebastián, Leandro	Damián, Claudia	Sebastián, Juan	Jonathan, Juan	Juan, Claudia	Juan, Claudia	Sebastián, Mariela	Sebastián, Juan	Evicted (Day 113)		19
Gabriel	Marianela, Claudia	Mariela, Jéssica	Mariela, Jéssica	Mariela, Jéssica	Mariela, Jéssica	Mariela, Leandro	Sebastián, Mariela	Sebastián, Leandro	Mariela, Sebastián	Claudia, Leandro	Juan, Mariela	Juan, Mariela	Marianela, Juan	Claudia, Marianela	Mariela, Marianela	Evicted (Day 105)			28
Claudia	Melisa, Griselda	Evicted (Day 8)									Banned	Banned	Refused	Refused	Re-evicted (Day 98)				22
Jéssica	Pablo, Claudia	Gabriel, Silvina	Vanina, Silvina	Silvina, Marianela	Silvina, Pablo	Pablo, Marianela	~~Marianela,~~; ~~Pablo~~	~~Mariela,~~; ~~Marianela~~	Mariela, Leandro	Claudia, Nadia	Mariela, Jessica	Mariela, Claudia	Marianela, Mariela	Evicted (Day 91)					12
Jonathan	Melisa, Silvina	Melisa, Mariela	Griselda, Mariela	Damián, Marianela	Silvina, Leandro	Leandro, Diego	Leandro, Diego	Leandro, Diego	Leandro, Mariela	Claudia, Nadia	Mariela, Jonathan	Mariela, Marianela	Evicted (Day 80)						20
Griselda	Vanina, Claudia	Melisa, Agustín	Vanina, Marianela	Marianela, Silvina	Silvina, Agustín	Agustín, Pablo	Marianela, Mariela	Mariela, Leandro	Leandro, Mariela	Nadia, Damián	Claudia, Mariela	Evicted (Day 73)							41
Leandro	Pablo, Vanina	Jonathan, Mariela	Marianela, Vanina	Marianela, Damián	Silvina, Leandro	Jonathan, Diego	Gabriel, Nadia	Jonathan, Griselda	Jonathan, Griselda	Evicted (Day 63)									34
Nadia	Pablo, Silvina	Leandro, Melisa	Leandro, Marianela	Marianela, Mariela	Marianela, Pablo	Marianela, Pablo	Marianela, Pablo	Marianela, Leandro	Evicted (Day 56)										15
Pablo	Claudia, Jonathan	Damián, Marianela	Damián, Leandro	Damián, Mariela	Leandro, Mariela	Mariela, Diego	Mariela, Leandro	Evicted (Day 49)											35
Agustín	Melisa, Jéssica	Melisa, Mariela	Griselda, Mariela	Damián, Gabriel	Diego, Marianela	Griselda, Mariela	Evicted (Day 42)												8
Silvina	Claudia, Nadia	Mariela, Jonathan	Mariela, Damián	Damián, Jéssica	Agustín, Jéssica	Evicted (Day 35)													36
Damián	Mariela, Silvina	Griselda, Melisa	Marianela, Silvina	Marianela, Silvina	Evicted (Day 28)														21
Vanina	Pablo, Griselda	Griselda, Melisa	Griselda, Melisa	Evicted (Day 21)															14
Melisa	Claudia, Silvina	Griselda, Marianela	Evicted (Day 15)																9
Notes	11	none	12	13	14	15	16	17	18	19	20	none	21	22	23	24	25		
Hot Phone	Sebastián	none	Diego	Diego	Jonathan	Marianela	Griselda	none											
Nominated	Claudia, Pablo, Sebastián	Griselda, Melisa	Marianela, Vanina	Damián, Marianela	Juan, Leandro, Silvina	Agustín, Diego, Griselda, Leandro, Mariela, ~~Marianela~~	Marianela, Pablo	Leandro, Nadia	Leandro, Mariela	Agustín, Claudia, Damián, Leandro, Melisa, Nadia, Pablo, Silvina, Vanina	Griselda, Mariela	Jonathan, Mariela	Claudia, Jéssica, Marianela	Claudia, Juan	Gabriel, Juan, Mariela, Sebastián	Diego, Juan, Sebastián	Juan, Marianela, Mariela, Sebastián		
Evicted	Claudia; 49.2% to evict	Melisa; 80.4% to evict	Vanina; 72.1% to evict	Damián; 60.2% to evict	Silvina; 62.5% to evict	Agustín; 42.5% to evict	Pablo; 57% to evict	Nadia; 91.9% to evict	Leandro; 67.9% to evict	Claudia; 15 of 27 points to return	Griselda; 75.4% to evict	Jonathan; 82.9% to evict	Jéssica; 64.2% to evict	Claudia; 84.7% to evict	Gabriel; 42.1% to evict	Diego; 43.2% to evict	Sebastián; 9.2% (out of 4) to win	Mariela; 24.45% (out of 3) to win	
Evicted	Claudia; 49.2% to evict	Melisa; 80.4% to evict	Vanina; 72.1% to evict	Damián; 60.2% to evict	Silvina; 62.5% to evict	Agustín; 42.5% to evict	Pablo; 57% to evict	Nadia; 91.9% to evict	Leandro; 67.9% to evict	Claudia; 15 of 27 points to return	Griselda; 75.4% to evict	Jonathan; 82.9% to evict	Jéssica; 64.2% to evict	Claudia; 84.7% to evict	Gabriel; 42.1% to evict	Diego; 43.2% to evict	Juan; 34.09% (out of 3) to win	Marianela; 41.46% to win	

===== Notes =====
- ^Note 11: On Day 7, Sebastián answered the Hot Phone, and by doing so was automatically nominated by Gran Hermano. Juan nominated himself, allocating all 3 points towards his total.
- ^Note 12: By answering the Hot Phone in Week 3, Diego was immune from being nominated this week. Mariela used the Diary Room's special power, therefore, she was able to make one of her nominations worth 3 points as opposed to 1.
- ^Note 13: By answering the Hot Phone in Week 4, Diego was immune from being nominated this week. Marianela used the Diary Room's special power, therefore, she was able to make one of her nominations worth 3 points as opposed to 1.
- ^Note 14: By answering the Hot Phone in Week 5, Jonathan doubled his nomination points and, for this week only, could nominate with 4 points and 2 points. This week, Housemates were able to nominate themselves without being forced to allocate all three points to themselves. Because Juan refused to nominate, Gran Hermano automatically nominated him.
- ^Note 15: This week, the three or more Housemates with the most points will face the public vote. By answering the Hot Phone in Week 6, Marianela was given the power to save a nominee from eviction. She chose to save herself.
- ^Note 16: By answering the Hot Phone in Week 7, Griselda won the right to amend the nominations. She chose to void Jéssica's nominations and double the power of Nadia's nominations.
- ^Note 17: Mariela used the Diary Room's special power, therefore, she was able to make one of her nominations worth 3 points as opposed to 1. As punishment for discussing nominations, Jéssica's nominations were voided by Gran Hermano.
- ^Note 18: Marianela used the Diary Room's special power, therefore, she was able to make one of her nominations worth 3 points as opposed to 1. However, as punishment for discussing nominations, Marianela's nominations were voided by Gran Hermano.
- ^Note 19: On Day 66, Housemates were given the option of allowing a previously evicted Housemate back into the House. By a vote of 6-3, they elected to nominate a Housemate to return. Claudia returned with 15 of 27 points. However, Claudia is banned from nominating during the next two weeks. She can still be nominated by her fellow Housemates.
- ^Note 20: Marianela used the Diary Room's special power, therefore, she was able to make one of her nominations worth 3 points as opposed to 1. This week, Housemates were able to nominate themselves without being forced to allocate all three points to themselves.
- ^Note 21: Claudia refused to nominate. As punishment, Gran Hermano declared she would automatically face eviction.
- ^Note 22: Claudia refused to nominate. As punishment, Gran Hermano declared she would have automatically faced eviction. However, she already had enough points to face the public vote. This week, Housemates were able to nominate themselves without being forced to allocate all three points to themselves.
- ^Note 23: Juan refused to nominate. As punishment, Gran Hermano declared he would have automatically faced eviction. However, he already had enough points to face the public vote.
- ^Note 24: Juan refused to nominate. As punishment, Gran Hermano declared he would have automatically faced eviction. However, he already had enough points to face the public vote. Marianela used the Diary Room's special power, therefore, she was able to make one of her nominations worth 3 points as opposed to 1.
- ^Note 25: In the final the viewing public were voting for who they wanted to win, not to evict.

==== Repechage ====
During week 9, Gran Hermano decided to realize a repechage to give a former HouseGuest the opportunity to re-enter the house, with the option to decide whether to realize it or not to the current HouseGuests. The voting resulted with 6 votes in favor of the repechage (Gabriel, Jessica, Jonathan, Juan, Marianela and Sebastián) and 3 against it (Diego, Griselda and Mariela). The current HouseGuests voted to decide who would re-enter the house, and with 15 votes Claudia Ciardone finally re-entered the house with the ban on nominating for the first two weeks since her return.

Ex-housemate	Votes	Result
Claudia Ciardone	15	Re-entered; Day 73
Nadia Epstein	5	Evicted; Day 73
Damián Fortunato	3	Evicted; Day 73
Leandro Maldonado	3	Evicted; Day 73
Vanina Gramuglia	1	Evicted; Day 73
Agustín Belforte	0	Evicted; Day 73
Melisa Durán	0	Evicted; Day 73
Pablo Espósito	0	Evicted; Day 73
Silvina Scheffler	0	Evicted; Day 73

=== Gran Hermano Famosos (2007) ===
The Celebrity season of the reality television series Gran Hermano premiered on 13 May 2007 on Telefe in Argentina, and ended on 1 August 2007 after 81 days of competition, becoming the shortest season to date. Jorge Rial returned as host. Diego Leonardi was crowned the winner defeating runner-up Jacqueline Dutrá with 82 percent of the votes by the public, earning a prize of 66,666 Argentine pesos.

==== HouseGuests ====
Name	Age	Residence	Day entered	Day exited	Result
Diego Leonardi	28	Ciudadela, Buenos Aires	28	81	Winner
Jacqueline Dutrá	34	Governador Valadares, Minas Gerais	1	81	Runner-up
Lissa Vera	25	San Justo, Buenos Aires	1	81	Third Place
Fernanda Neil	24	Buenos Aires	1	79	Fourth Place
Carlos Nair Menem	26	Las Lomitas, Formosa	1	72	Evicted
Robertino Tarantini	25	Barcelona, Catalonia	15	65	Evicted
Jorge Castro	39	Caleta Olivia, Santa Cruz	1	58	Evicted
Pablo Tamagnini	24	Río Segundo, Córdoba	1	50	Evicted
Cinthia Fernández	18	Buenos Aires	1	44	Evicted
Mariana Otero	40	Buenos Aires	1	37	Evicted
Hernán Caire	38	Buenos Aires	1	33	Walked
Melina Pitra	21	Hurlingham, Buenos Aires	15	30	Evicted
Luis Vadala	53	Buenos Aires	1	28	Walked
Nino Dolce	35	Lanús, Buenos Aires	1	23	Evicted
Dolores Moreno	33	Palermo, Buenos Aires	1	15	Evicted
Pachu Peña	45	Rosario, Santa Fe	1	15	Walked
Amalia Granata	26	Rosario, Santa Fe	1	8	Evicted

==== Voting history ====
HouseGuests nominated for two and one points, shown in descending order in the nomination box. The two or more HouseGuests with the most nomination points faced the public vote. The "Special Nomination" in which a HouseGuest nominates with the option to allocate 3 points and 2 points to their nominees continued to be used during this season.

The HouseGuest that used the Diary Room's Special Nomination is marked in orange.

	Week 1	Week 2	Week 3	Week 4	Week 5	Week 6	Week 7	Week 8	Week 9	Week 10	Week 11 Final		Nomination points received
Diego	Not in House				Banned	Robertino, Cinthia	Pablo, Lissa	Jorge, Fernanda	Refused	Carlos, Jacqueline	Winner (Day 81)		18
Jacqueline	Amalia, Carlos	Luis, Nino	Refused	Robertino, Hernán	Robertino, Lissa	Robertino, Lissa	Jacqueline, Robertino	Diego, Robertino	Diego, Lissa	Carlos, Diego	Runner-up (Day 81)		11
Lissa	Amalia, Carlos	Luis, Pachu	Nino, Jorge	Mariana, Robertino	Robertino, Fernanda	Carlos, Jacqueline	Robertino, Fernanda	Robertino, Diego	Fernanda, Robertino	Carlos, Fernanda	Third place (Day 81)		17
Fernanda	Amalia, Jorge	Mariana, Pachu	Luis, Mariana	Cinthia, Pablo	Cinthia, Mariana	Cinthia, Pablo	Pablo, Carlos	Jorge, Lissa	Lissa, Diego	Lissa, Diego	Evicted (Day 79)		20
Carlos	Amalia, Fernanda	Luis, Nino	~~Nino,~~; Fernanda	Jorge, Robertino	Cinthia, Diego	Cinthia, Robertino	Robertino, Lissa	Robertino, Diego	Robertino, Jacqueline	~~Diego,~~; Jacqueline	Evicted (Day 72)		14
Robertino	Not in House		Exempt	Jorge, Luis	Refused	Refused	Robertino, Lissa	Robertino, Jacqueline	Robertino, Jacqueline	Evicted (Day 65)			40
Jorge	Amalia, Pablo	Mariana, Lissa	~~Nino,~~; ~~Mariana~~	Mariana, Robertino	Mariana, Diego	Robertino, Cinthia	Robertino, Diego	~~Diego,~~; Fernanda	Evicted (Day 58)				21
Pablo	Amalia, Nino	Refused	Nino, Lissa	Mariana, Melina	Mariana, Jacqueline	Cinthia, Robertino	Jacqueline, Robertino	Evicted (Day 50)					10
Cinthia	Amalia, Luis	Fernanda, Luis	Nino; Hernán	Fernanda, Luis	Diego, Hernán	Fernanda, Robertina	Evicted (Day 44)						15
Mariana	Nino, Fernanda	Jorge, Nino	~~Nino,~~; Fernanda	Pablo, Jorge	Diego, Hernán	Evicted (Day 37)							26
Hernán	Amalia, Fernanda	Mariana, Dolores	Nino, Carlos	Jorge, Lissa	Refused	Walked (Day 33)							7
Melina	Not in House		Exempt	Refused	Evicted (Day 30)								1
Luis	Nino; Amalia	Nino; Dolores	~~Nino~~; ~~Mariana~~	Mariana; Lissa	Walked (Day 28)								15
Nino	Mariana, Carlos	Luis, Pablo	Refused	Evicted (Day 23)									29
Pachu	Nino, Lissa	Jorge, Lissa	Walked (Day 15)										4
Dolores	Amalia, Carlos	Refused	Evicted (Day 15)										2
Amalia	Hernán, Jorge	Evicted (Day 8)											19
Notes	none	26	27	28	29	30	31	32	33	34	35		
Nominated For Eviction	Amalia, Nino	Dolores, Luis, Mariana, Pablo	Fernanda, Hernán, Jacqueline, Luis, Nino	Jorge, Mariana, Melina	Diego, Mariana, Robertino	Cinthia, Robertino	Jacqueline, Pablo, Robertino	Jorge, Robertino	Diego, Lissa, Robertino	Carlos, Diego, Jacqueline, Lissa	Diego, Fernanda, Jacqueline, Lissa		
Walked	none		Pachu	Luis	Hernán	none							
Evicted	Amalia; 54.5% to evict	Dolores; 51.5% to evict	Nino; 64.1% to evict	Melina; 45.5% to evict	Mariana; 58.9% to evict	Cinthia; 73.3% to evict	Pablo; 60.2% to evict	Jorge; 73.5% to evict	Robertino; 48.5% to evict	Carlos; 54.5% to evict	Fernanda; 10% (out of 4)	Lissa; Fewest votes (out of 3)	
Evicted	Amalia; 54.5% to evict	Dolores; 51.5% to evict	Nino; 64.1% to evict	Melina; 45.5% to evict	Mariana; 58.9% to evict	Cinthia; 73.3% to evict	Pablo; 60.2% to evict	Jorge; 73.5% to evict	Robertino; 48.5% to evict	Carlos; 54.5% to evict	Jacqueline; 18% (out of 2)	Diego; 82% to win	

===== Notes =====
- ^Note 26: Dolores and Pablo both refused to nominate, therefore, both automatically faced the public vote. Fernanda used the Diary Room's Special Power, therefore, she was able to make one of her nominations worth 3 points as opposed to 1.
- ^Note 27: Jacqueline and Nino both refused to nominate, therefore, Jaqueline automatically faced the public vote. Nino would have also automatically faced the public vote if he was not already nominated. Cinthia used the Diary Room's Special Power, therefore, she was able to make one of her nominations worth 3 points as opposed to 1. Carlos, Jorge, Luis and Mariana had their nominations for Nino voided as punishment for plotting together to nominate him. Jorge and Luis also plotted to nominate Mariana - and both had their nominations for her voided. New Housemates Melina and Robertino were exempt from nominations this week - they could not nominate or be nominated.
- ^Note 28: Melina refused to nominate, therefore, she automatically faced the public vote. Cinthia used the Diary Room's Special Power, therefore, she was able to make one of her nominations worth 3 points as opposed to 1.
- ^Note 29: Hernán and Robertino both refused to nominate, therefore, Robertino automatically faced the public vote. Hernán did not have to face the public vote because had told Gran Hermano that he would be leaving the House. Housemates were unaware of this and were still able to nominate him. Fernanda used the Diary Room's Special Power, therefore, she was able to make one of her nominations worth 3 points as opposed to 1.
- ^Note 30: Robertino refused to nominate. Had he not been nominated by his fellow Housemates, he would have automatically faced the public vote.
- ^Note 31: Housemates were allowed to nominate themselves this week if they chose to do so.
- ^Note 32: Diego used the Diary Room's Special Power, therefore, he was able to make one of his nominations worth 3 points as opposed to 1. Housemates were allowed to nominate themselves this week if they chose to do so. Jorge's nomination of Diego was voided due to Jorge discussing this nomination to another Housemate.
- ^Note 33: Diego refused to nominate. Had he not been nominated by his fellow Housemates, he would have automatically faced the public vote. Housemates were allowed to nominate themselves this week if they chose to do so.
- ^Note 34: Carlos' nomination of Diego was voided due to Carlos disclosing it to the rest of the House.
- ^Note 34: This week, the public were voting to win, rather than to evict. On Day 79, Fernanda was evicted after receiving the fewest votes to win. Following this, voting resumed for the 3 finalists.

=== Season 5 (2007) ===
Season 5 started on 8 August 2007 and finishe on 2 December 2007, lasting a total 116 days.

The contestants were introduced with their colelagues of Gran Hermano Paraguay, who were in fact actors located in a nearby studio in Buenos Aires. They played a series of challenges, which were rigged in favor of Paraguay.

==== Housemates ====
Housemate	Age	Status
Esteban Morais	27	Winner
Soledad Melli	25	Runner-Up; Exchange with Gran Hermano 9 Spain
Juan Emilio De Antón	20	3rd Finalist
Celeste Nicpon	19	4th Finalist
Sebastián Graviotto	20	14th Evicted
Eugenia Puggioni	23	8th Evicted /13th Evicted
Florencia Merluzzi	23	12th Evicted
Damián Terrille	24	Walked
Andrea Rincón	22	11th Evicted
Javier Medina (Javi)	25	10th Evicted
Florencia Tesouro (Flopy)	22	9th Evicted
Renzo Rosso	23	8th Evicted
Juan Simón Muelas	18	7th Evicted
Mariana Mancini	22	Walked
Darío Gutiérrez	23	6th Evicted
Javier Maillo	30	5th Evicted
Alan Zulcovsky	22	4th Evicted
Cynthia Fernández	23	3rd Evicted
Solange Maldonado	28	2nd Evicted
Jordana Garibaldi	22	1st Evicted

==== Nominations Table ====
In this series, the first person to go to the diary room to nominate has the option to allocate 3 points and 2 points to their nominees. This is called the "Special Nomination" and must be used before nominations start. All other housemates can assign 2 points and 1 point to their nominees. The first housemate listed received the most points and the second housemate listed received the fewest points.

The Housemate that used the Diary Room's Special Power is marked in orange.

	Week 1	Week 2	Week 3	Week 4	Week 5	Week 6	Week 7	Week 8	Week 9	Week 10	Week 11	Week 13	Week 14	Week 15	Week 16	Week 17 Final		Nomination points received
Esteban	Celeste; Mariana	Celeste; Mariana	Florencia; Celeste	Andrea; Florencia	Mariana; Andrea	Soledad; Celeste	Soledad; Andrea	Florencia; Andrea	Andrea; Soledad	Andrea; Soledad	Celeste; Andrea	Andrea; Florencia	Florencia; Celeste	Soledad; Celeste	Soledad; Celeste	Winner (Day 117)		36
Soledad	Celeste; Juan-Simón	Darío; Esteban	Javi; Juan-Simón	Javi; Darío	Juan-Simón; Mariana	Darío; Javi	Juan-Simón; Renzo	Renzo; Esteban	Flopy; Eugenia	Esteban; Eugenia	Javi; Esteban	Esteban; Juan-Emilio	Esteban; Florencia	Juan-Emilio; Esteban	Esteban; Sebastián	Runner-up (Day 117)		37
Juan-Emilio	Andrea; Juan-Simón	Juan-Simón; Andrea	Juan-Simón; Andrea	Andrea; Juan-Simón	Juan-Simón; Andrea	Juan-Simón; Andrea	Andrea; Juan-Simón	Andrea; Renzo	Flopy; Sebastián	Esteban; Soledad	Florencia; Celeste	Celeste; Sebastián	Florencia; Celeste	Celeste; Soledad	Sebastián; Soledad	Third place (Day 117)		7
Celeste	Jordana; Cynthia	Esteban; Solange	Cynthia; Juan-Simón	Alan; Darío	Javier; Darío	Darío; Eugenia	Renzo; Juan-Simón	Renzo; Esteban	Sebastián; Eugenia	Sebastián; Javi	Sebastián; Javi	Sebastián; Esteban	Sebastián; Esteban	Esteban; Sebastián	Sebastián; Esteban	Evicted (Day 113)		63
Sebastián	Not in House							Exempt	Celeste; Florencia	Celeste; Florencia	Celeste; Florencia	Celeste; Florencia	Celeste; Florencia	Juan-Emilio; Soledad	Celeste; Soledad	Evicted (Day 110)		27
Eugenia	Mariana; Damián	Florencia; Renzo	Mariana; Renzo	Mariana; Andrea	Celeste; Mariana	Celeste; Mariana	Soledad; Celeste	Soledad; Andrea	Soledad; Andrea	Soledad; Andrea	Evicted (Day 68)			Banned	Re-evicted (Day 103)			20
Florencia	Celeste; Juan-Simón	Cynthia; Eugenia	Eugenia; Cynthia	Darío; Javier	Juan-Simón; Darío	Darío; Esteban	Juan-Simón; Esteban	Esteban; Renzo	Flopy; Sebastián	Esteban; Sebastián	Sebastián; Celeste	Soledad; Andrea	Sebastián; Soledad	Evicted (Day 96)				26
Damián	Jordana; Juan-Simón	Solange; Darío	Dario; Juan-Simón	Juan-Simón; Alan	Renzo; Juan-Simón	Soledad; Darío	Renzo; Juan-Simón	Renzo; Esteban	Javi; Flopy	Javi; Eugenia	Javi; Andrea	Andrea; Sebastián	Walked (Day 92)					9
Andrea	Eugnia; Damián	Renzo; Cynthia	Cynthia; Renzo	Alan; Javier	Javier; Renzo	Renzo; Darío	~~Renzo~~; Juan-Simón	Renzo; Esteban	Javi; Flopy	Eugenia; Esteban	Sebastián; Javi	Esteban; Florencia	Evicted (Day 89)					73
Javi	Jordana; Javier	Solange; Darío	Eugenia; Esteban	Andrea; Esteban	Juan-Simón; Esteban	Juan-Simón; Eugenia	Juan-Simón; Andrea	Andrea; Soledad	Andrea; Flopy	Celeste; Soledad	Celeste; Andrea	Evicted (Day 75)						21
Flopy	Not in House							Exempt	Andrea; Soledad	Evicted (Day 61)								9
Renzo	Andrea; Mariana	Eugenia; Mariana	Cynthia; Eugenia	Andrea; Mariana	Mariana; Andrea	Andrea; Mariana	Mariana; Soledad	Celeste; Soledad	Evicted (Day 54)									34
Juan-Simón	Juan-Emilio; Javier	Celeste; Alan	Cynthia; Alan	Damián; Florencia	Damián; Andrea	Javi; Soledad	Soledad; Andrea	Evicted (Day 47)										39
Mariana	Cynthia; Javier	Cynthia; Renzo	Cynthia; Alan	Alan; Darío	Javier; Darío	Darío; Renzo	Walked (Day 43)											43
Darío	Andrea; Javier	Mariana; Andrea	Mariana; Florencia	Andrea; Mariana	Mariana; Andrea	Mariana; Celeste	Evicted (Day 40)											26
Javier	Solange; Darío	Solange; Andrea	Andrea; Damián	Andrea; Mariana	Mariana; Celeste	Evicted (Day 33)												12
Alan	Renzo; Eugenia	Mariana; Juan-Simón	Damián; Andrea	Andrea; Mariana	Evicted (Day 26)													10
Cynthia	Mariana; Andrea	Mariana; Celeste	Renzo; Mariana	Evicted (Day 19)														19
Solange	Javier; Florencia	Javier; Celeste	Evicted (Day 13)															10
Jordana	Andrea; Florencia	Evicted (Day 6)																6
Notes	36	37	none		38	39	40	41	none	42	43	44	45	46	47	48		
Nominated (pre-HoH)	Andrea, Celeste, Javier, Jordana, Mariana, Solange	Mariana, Solange	Cynthia, Eugenia, Juan-Simón, Mariana	Alan, Andrea	Juan-Simón, Mariana	Andrea, Darío, Mariana, Soledad	Juan-Simón, Soledad	Andrea, Esteban, Renzo	Andrea, Flopy	Esteban; Eugenia; Soledad	none	Andrea; Esteban	Celeste, Florencia, Sebastián	Eugenia, Juan-Emilio, Soledad	Sebastián, Soledad	none		
Head of House	Darío	Celeste	Andrea	Alan	Renzo	Juan-Emilio	Florencia	Renzo	Damián	Juan-Emilio	none	Damián	Sebastián	Sebastián	Esteban	none		
Saved	Solange	Mariana	Mariana	none	Juan-Simón	Eugenia	Javi	Eugenia	Andrea	Damián	none	Esteban	Juan-Emilio	none	none	none		
Nominated	Andrea, Celeste, Javier, Jordana, Mariana	Celeste, Solange	Cynthia, Eugenia, Juan-Simón	Alan, Andrea	Andrea, Javier, Mariana	Andrea, Darío, Mariana, Soledad	Juan-Simón, Soledad	Andrea, Esteban, Renzo	Flopy, Javi, Sebastián, Soledad	Esteban; Eugenia; Soledad	Celeste, Javi, Sebastián	Andrea, Celeste, Sebastián	Celeste, Florencia, Sebastián	Eugenia, Juan-Emilio, Soledad	Sebastián, Soledad	Celeste, Esteban, Juan-Emilio, Soledad		
Walked	none						Mariana	none					Damián	none				
Evicted	Jordana; 43.5% to evict	Solange; 74.3% to evict	Cynthia; 41.4% to evict	Alan; 77.7% to evict	Javier; 54.7% to evict	Darío; 53.2% to evict	Juan-Simón; 81.2% to evict	Renzo; 49.3% to evict	Flopy; 52% to evict	Eugenia; 53.9% to evict	Javi; 59.9% to evict	Andrea; 46.1% to evict	Florencia; 42.2% to evict	Eugenia; 46.6% (out of 5) to return	Sebastián; 82.8% to evict	Celeste; Fewest votes (out of 4)	Juan-Emilio; Fewest votes (out of 3)	
Evicted	Jordana; 43.5% to evict	Solange; 74.3% to evict	Cynthia; 41.4% to evict	Alan; 77.7% to evict	Javier; 54.7% to evict	Darío; 53.2% to evict	Juan-Simón; 81.2% to evict	Renzo; 49.3% to evict	Flopy; 52% to evict	Eugenia; 53.9% to evict	Javi; 59.9% to evict	Andrea; 46.1% to evict	Florencia; 42.2% to evict	Eugenia; 43.2% to evict	Sebastián; 82.8% to evict	Soledad; 41.72% (out of 2)	Esteban; 58.28% to win	

===== Notes =====
- ^Note 36: By answering the Hot Phone in Week 1, Solange was automatically nominated by Gran Hermano after nominations took place. Jordana used the Diary Room's Special Power, therefore, she was able to make one of her nominations worth 3 points as opposed to 1.
- ^Note 37: Damián used the Diary Room's Special Power, therefore, he was able to make one of his nominations worth 3 points as opposed to 1. Celeste, as Head of House, had the option to give a Housemate immunity from eviction after nominations were made but before the nominees for eviction were announced. She chose to save Mariana, which resulted in Celeste being named as the replacement nominee.
- ^Note 38: Renzo used the Diary Room's Special Power, therefore, he was able to make one of his nominations worth 3 points as opposed to 1.
- ^Note 39: By answering the Hot Phone in Week 6, Renzo was given the power to double his nomination points. His 2-point nomination became worth 4, while his 1-point nomination became worth 2.
- ^Note 40: Andrea used the Diary Room's Special Power, therefore, she was able to make one of her nominations worth 3 points as opposed to 1. However, as she disclosed to the other housemates that she used 3 points on Renzo, this nomination was voided. Had it not been voided, Renzo would have also faced the public vote. Mariana walked from the House on Day 43 after nominations. Because she was to leave, Gran Hermano did not have her nominate.
- ^Note 41: As new Housemates, Flopy and Sebastián were exempt from the nomination process this week.
- ^Note 42: Damián used the Diary Room's Special Power, therefore, he was able to make one of his nominations worth 3 points as opposed to 1.
- ^Note 43: Javi used the Diary Room's Special Power, therefore, he was able to make one of his nominations worth 3 points as opposed to 1. As Soledad was in the Grand Hermano Spain House this week, she was immune from being nominated.
- ^Note 44: Damián, as Head of House, had the option to give a Housemate immunity from eviction after nominations were made but before the nominees for eviction were announced. He chose to save Esteban, which meant that Celeste and Sebastián were now nominated for eviction along with Andrea.
- ^Note 45: Sebastián, as Head of House, had the option to give a Housemate immunity from eviction after nominations were made but before the nominees for eviction were announced. He chose to save Juan-Emilio, however, this did not affect the nomination lineup.
- ^Note 46: As a condition for Eugenia to re-enter the house, she was banned from nominating this week and automatically faced the public vote.
- ^Note 47: Sebastián used the Diary Room's Special Power, therefore, he was able to make one of his nominations worth 3 points as opposed to 1.
- ^Note 48: This week, the public were voting to win, rather than to evict. On Day 113, Celeste was evicted after receiving the fewest votes to win. Following this, voting resumed for the 3 finalists.

=== Season 6 (2010–11) ===
The sixth season of Gran Hermano Argentina premiered on Sunday December 12, 2010 hosted by Jorge Rial. For the first two weeks after the premiere, the Gala will be hosted by Marley due to Rial taking a holiday. It began on 12 December 2010, and the prize money for the series is 400,000 Argentine pesos (100,680 USD). The season ended on Sunday May 1, 2011 after lasting 141 days, becoming the longest series ever produced in the Americas. Also, third place, Martín Anchorena became the housemate that has stayed the longest in a Big Brother house in the Americas, at that time, by staying all.

On Day 50, Juan Pablo left the House, since he wanted to go back to his studies and during his stay, he repeatedly announced his intentions of leaving. After Cristian U. walked out of the House on Day 58, a repechage process began on Day 62, and the two housemates that decided to leave voluntarily were also asked to be part of this process. At the end of Day 62's live nominations show, only Juan Pablo decided to stay out of the repechage and evicted housemates Rocío, Ariana, Leandro, Natalí, Christian Y., Emiliano, and Gisele with walkee Cristian U. were put up for public vote to see who will be the two returning, it was announced that Cristian U., Emiliano, Gisele, and Rocío were the elected ones to go back in with the final decision to be revealed on Day 64's live eviction show.

On Day 64 (February 13, 2011) the four finalists of the repechage vote entered the house. Cristian U. and Rocío were the ones originally returning, he obtained 74,37% of all votes while she obtained 9,11% with Gisele and Emiliano obtaining 4,21% and 5,15% respectively. After their re-entrance, Jésica voluntarily left the house alleging she was missing her son.

On Day 127 (April 17, 2011), Solange Abraham became the women that has survived the longest number of days in a BB edition held on the Western Hemisphere by surviving from Day 1 until Day 127 when she was evicted, and this will be the first edition in Argentina in which all finalist are from the same gender, in this case, males.

On Day 141 (May 1, 2011), the final 3, Cristian U., Emiliano and Martín A. all received monetary prizes, Martín A. received 50,000 Argentine pesos, Emiliano received 90,000 Argentine pesos, the amount he received is not the one he was supposed to receive as the runner-up because he spent some days outside the house this also happened to winner Cristian U. that received 382,357 Argentine pesos instead of the original 400,000 Argentine pesos of the prize.

=== Season 7 (2011–12) ===
The seventh season of Gran Hermano Argentina started on November 2, 2011 on Telefe. The show's length was approximately five months, finished on April 16, 2012. The prize has been increased to AR$1,000,000 (USD235,000) which will be reduced according to how many times a housemate is nominated. The show is hosted by Jorge Rial, who has hosted the show since 2007, until January 13, 2012 when he left the show. Rial was replaced by Mariano Peluffo, who hosted Gran Hermano spinoff shows.

It became the longest series ever produced of any Big Brother show in the Americas with 164 days. All four finalists (Rodrigo, Walquiria, Jorge and Alex) also became the contestants in the continent with the most survived days in a single series. Rodrigo Fernandez became the winner, at age 19 became the youngest person to ever win the Argentinian series.

Also, this was the last series to air in Telefe, until 2022 when the network took over the format once more and greenlit the show's tenth civilian season.

=== Season 8 (2015) ===
Gran Hermano 2015 is the eighth season of the Argentinian version of the reality show Gran Hermano. This season was confirmed in December 2014 by the main executive of the network Liliana Parodi. It was the first season to be broadcast on América TV after being previously in Telefe. The premiere was set for Wednesday 29 April 2015, being delayed one week from its original debut date. This season will come three years after the end of the most recent one. This season finished on 30 September 2015, after 155 days, becoming the second longest season ever produced in the country after the seventh season.

Jorge Rial announced that he would return to the show's main hosting duties, after leaving the position halfway during the previous season due to personal issues. Pamela David, one of America's main personalities, took over on hosting the show's Debates and Daily Highlights.

=== Season 9 (2016) ===
Gran Hermano 2016 is the ninth season of the Argentinian version of the reality show Gran Hermano. This season was confirmed as part of a multi-season deal subscribed between América TV and Endemol Argentina when the network took over the rights. The premiere of this season was originally set to debut in March 2016, confirmed by Jorge Rial during the Gran Hermano 2015 finale on 30 September 2015. This season began on 18 May 2016.

After the previous season started to provide peaks of up to 12 points for América TV in the primetime ratings, the network quickly decided to extend the agreement and this new season has been rumored to come since July, but it wasn't until September 2015 when it was technically confirmed just awaiting the network's major call for open castings. Castings opened officially on 1 October 2015.

As the show's house would be used for Big Brother Panamá just days after this season's conclusion, and also, after this season suffered a decrease in ratings and advertising revenue compared to the previous one, it has been confirmed that this season would end on 24 August 2016, lasting 99 days and becoming the shortest season ever produced in the country. An additional season was expected but after several considerations, América TV did not produce a new season. However, the day after this season finale, Debate host Pamela David announced in her morning talk show Desayuno Americano that "next year the Celebrity season is coming up", referencing a potential Celebrity season exactly 10 years after the first one ever aired in the country. Also, days before the season came to its end, host Jorge Rial announced that this season would actually be his last.

Luis Fabián "Luifa" Galesio was crowned the winner on 24 August 2016 after surviving 92 days in the house of the 99 that season lasted. Ivana Icardi became the runner-up. Third place went to Mauricio Guirao, while fourth went to Leandro Robin and fifth place went to Yasmila Anna Mendeguía. This season is being called the most "fixed" in the show's history in the country, and there was a possibility of the second celebrity season in 2017. Luifa won with 60,1% of all votes against Ivana in a final match, and he will receive this season's cash prize together with a brand new house. As this season's runner-up, Ivana landed a gig as a panelist in one of América TV's talk shows most likely joining Jorge Rial's Intrusos. Mauricio, who finished third received a brand new car and a house for his whole family.

=== Season 10 (2022–23) ===
The tenth season of the Argentine version of the television reality show Gran Hermano was announced on 21 June 2022 by Telefe. After last airing on América TV in 2016, the show made its return to the original network Telefe, and it would be the first series to air in the network since the seventh season that aired during 2011–2012.

Santiago del Moro was formally announced as the show's new host. The show follows a group of contestants (known as HouseGuests), who live in a house together while being constantly filmed and having no communication with the outside world as they compete to win a grand prize of ARS 15 million and a house. The runner-up also wins a house. Each week, the HouseGuests compete in a Head of Household (HoH) competition which gives them immunity from nominations and the power to save one of the nominees up for eviction. On eviction night, the audience votes to evict one of the nominees.

The season premiered on 17 October 2022, and ran for 162 days, with the season ending on 27 March 2023. Marcos Ginocchio was crowned the winner of the season, with Juan Ignacio Castañares finishing as runner-up and Julieta Poggio in third place.

=== Season 11 (2023–24) ===
The eleventh season of Gran Hermano was announced on 26 March 2023 by Telefe during the penultimate episode of the tenth season, with the casting being opened on that same day. It was later announced that the season would start on December 11, 2023, and end on 7 July 2024 after 210 days, becoming the longest season to date.

Bautista Mascia was crowned the winner of the season, with Emmanuel Vich finishing as runner-up and Nicolás Grosman in third place.

=== Season 12 (2024–25) ===
Gran Hermano was renewed for a twelfth season on 3 July 2024 by Telefe four days before the final gala of the eleventh season, with the casting being opened on that same day. The season premiered on 2 December 2024 and concluded on 24 June 2025, after 205 days.

Santiago Algorta was crowned the winner of the season, with Ulises Apóstolo finishing as runner-up and Luz Tito in third place.

=== Season 13: Golden Generation (2026) ===
Gran Hermano was renewed by Telefe for a thirteenth season on 22 June 2025, before the twelfth season finale. It is called Golden Generation and includes a mix of celebrities, former HouseGuests and new contestants. The season premiered on 23 February 2026, and will conclude on 14 September 2026, following a run of 206 days.
