= Intrusos en el espectáculo =

- Genre: Talk show
- Created by: Jorge Rial
- Presented by: Adrián Pallares and Rodrigo Lussich
- Opening theme: "You're the First, the Last, My Everything" by Barry White (seasons 5–20) "Dame más" by Francheros (seasons 21–22) "Siempre seré un intruso" by Javier Calamaro (season 25–present)
- Country of origin: Argentina
- Original language: Spanish
- No. of seasons: 26

Production
- Production location: Palermo
- Running time: 120 minutes

Original release
- Network: América TV
- Release: January 1, 2001 – present

Intrusos en el espectáculo (Spanish: Intruders in Entertainment) is an Argentine chat show hosted by Jorge Rial from 2001 to 2020, Florencia de la V from 2022 to 2024 and as of 2026, is hosted by Adrián Pallares and Rodrigo Lussich, who also hosted the show between 2021 and 2022.

== Staff ==
=== Hosts ===
- Jorge Rial (2001–2020)
- Adrián Pallares (2021–2022, 2025–present)
- Rodrigo Lussich (2021–2022, 2025–present)
- Florencia de la V (2022–2024)

Guest hosts

- Luis Ventura (2001–2014, 2022, 2025)
- Beto Casella (2003)
- Marcelo Polino (2014–2020, 2023)
- Adrián Pallares (2014–2021)
- Rodrigo Lussich (2015, 2021)
- Mariano Iúdica (2017)
- Moria Casan (2018)
- Alejandro Fantino (2022)
- Marcela Tauro (2022–2025)
- Guido Záffora (2022, 2024)
- Laura Ubfal (2024)

=== Current panelists ===
- Camilo García (2001–2002, 2026–present)
- Marcela Tauro (2003, 2005–2020, 2022–present)
- Marcela Baños (2011–2014, 2021–2022, 2026–present)
- Daniel Ambrosino (2016-2020, 2022, 2026–present)
- Paula Varela (2020-2022, 2025–present)
- Natalie Weber (2026–present).
