= Mariano Peluffo =

Argentine television presenter (born 1971)

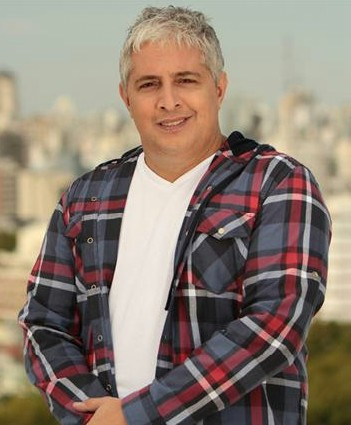
Mariano Peluffo

Mariano Peluffo (born April 1, 1971 in Buenos Aires) is an Argentine television presenter.

He began his career as a producer in El Agujerito Sin Fin, a children's programme of Canal 13 in the 90s with Julián Weich.

His most famous work was in the Gran Hermano's programmes (Big Brothers) (two in 2001 and one in 2002/2003). Between 2003 and 2007, Peluffo worked in Zoobichos, Sentí el Verano and Vamos a Ganar. On January 9, 2007 he returned to Gran Hermano with the fourth edition and during 2007, Peluffo worked in two more Gran Hermanos (Big Brothers); Gran Hermano Famosos (Big Brother Celebrities) and Gran Hermano 5 (Big Brother 5). He is currently working in Gran Hermano 2011 (Big Brother 2011).

Peluffo worked in a new programme called ¿Por qué no te callas? (Why don't you shut up?), a debate programme with family situations. He also worked in "Talento Argentino" (Argentinian Talent), the Argentinian version of Got Talent. He has been host of the first Argentinian edition of MasterChef.
