= Jorge Rial =

Argentine TV host and businessman (born 1961)

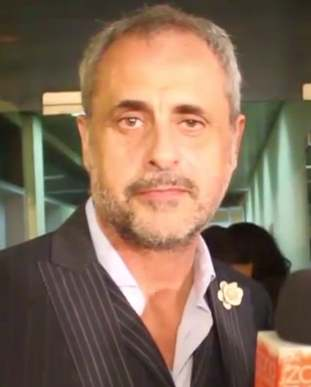
- Rial in 2014
- Born: Jorge Ricardo Rial; 16 October 1961 (age 64); Munro, Buenos Aires, Argentina
- Spouses: Silvia D'Auro (m. 1990; div. 2011) Romina Pereiro (m. 2019; div. 2022)
- Children: 2

Jorge Ricardo Rial (born 16 October 1961) is an Argentine television host and businessman.

Rial started working in newspaper media in the early 1980s and he eventually starred in the comic domestic movie Los Extermineitors. He then got involved in television media as a reporter of television programme Indiscreciones hosted by Lucho Avilés in the 1990s, but an acrimonious relationship developed between Rial and Avilés, causing Rial to leave the programme's staff.

Jorge Rial hosted gossip-related television programmes El Periscopio (with Graciela Alfano, and then Andrea Frigerio), Paparazzi, Paf!. His programme Intrusos en el espectáculo is now broadcast on Argentina's América 2. He was the director of content for América 2 during 2002, but was later replaced, and he has since focused on television media and his gossip-related "Paparazzi" magazine. Between 2007 and 2016, he hosted the local version of Big Brother "Gran Hermano" on Argentina's largest broadcaster Telefe.

He wrote the book Polvo de estrellas featuring the lives of celebrities and politicians involved in farándula, and another book called El intruso regarding the same subject.

During the late 2009 early 2010 season he was also the main character of Angel y Demonio a play which received the Estrellas de Mar award in its category. It became a national theatrical success after a nationwide tour.

He is currently Intrusos en el espectáculo, a weekday entertainment show; The successful program of Argentina in the afternoon time (13:00-15:30) as well as the most successful program of América 2. Since March 1, 2010, he has been the host of a 9 a.m. to 12 p.m. daily radio program, Ciudad Gótika, in Radio La Red (AM 910). The program includes interviews of politicians and celebrities as well as a radio theater.

Jorge Rial has two adopted daughters: Morena and Rocío with his ex-wife Silvia D'Auro.
