= Gran Hermano (Argentine TV series) season 13 =

Gran Hermano
- Season 13
- Gran Hermano season 13 logo
- Presented by: Santiago del Moro
- No. of housemates: 43
- Winner: Solange Gómez
- Runner-up: Yisela Pintos
- No. of episodes: 68

Release
- Original network: Telefe
- Original release: 23 February – 16 September 2026

Season chronology
- ← Previous; Season 12 Next → Season 14

The thirteenth season of the Argentine version of the television reality show Gran Hermano, subtitled as Gran Hermano: Golden Generation (Generación Dorada in Spanish), was announced on 22 June 2025 by Telefe, with Santiago del Moro continuing as the show's host.

The show follows a group of contestants (known as HouseGuests), who live in a house together while being constantly filmed and having no communication with the outside world as they compete to win a grand prize. Each week, the HouseGuests compete in a Head of Household (HoH) competition which gives them immunity from nominations and the power to save one of the nominees up for eviction. On eviction night, the audience votes to evict one of the nominees.

The season premiered on 23 February 2026 on Telefe. This season features a mix of celebrities, former HouseGuests and new contestants and marks the 25th anniversary from the show's premiere back in 2001. The two night finale event is set to air on 14 and 16 September 2026, where the series will finish after 206 days. On 13 September 2026, Gran Hermano was renewed by Telefe for a fourteenth season.

Solange Gomez was crowned the winner of the season, with Yisela Pintos as the runner-up.

== Format ==
The show follows a group of contestants, known as HouseGuests, who live inside a custom-built house outfitted with cameras and microphones recording their every move 24 hours a day. The HouseGuests are sequestered with no contact with the outside world. During their stay, the HouseGuests share their thoughts on their day-to-day lives inside the house in a private room known as the Diary Room. Each week, the HouseGuests compete in competitions to win power and safety inside the house. At the start of each week, the HouseGuests compete in a Head of Household (abbreviated as "HOH") competition. The winner of the HoH competition is immune from eviction. On eviction night, the audience vote to evict one of the nominees, and the nominee with the most votes is evicted from the house.

=== Format changes and additions ===
==== Mixed Vote ====
Throughout the season, some of the voting will combined the elements of both the Vote to Evict and Vote to Save formats. After everyone has voted, HouseGuests with the most points were nominated for eviction. The public then have 24 hours to vote to save one of the nominees when the vote closes, the HouseGuests with the most votes were saved. The public decision then switched to vote to evict, where at the end of the week, the HouseGuest that receives the most votes would be evicted.

==== Plants Nominations ====
In Week 2, a new nomination system was introduced to target passive, low-profile HouseGuests who do not contribute to the house dynamics. In Week 12 the twist returned, however all HouseGuests were nominated for eviction instead of a select few with two of them being evicted. In Week 19, the twist returned to be part of the mixed vote.

==== The Power Vote ====
From Weeks 2 through 9, evicted HouseGuests are given the power to give one HouseGuest three votes to use during nominations. The person who received this power nominates with three, two and one points instead of the usual two and one points.

==== Head of Household Super Powers ====
The HouseGuest that wins the HoH competition, gets series of Super Powers to use during the week.

Week	Head(s) of Household	Power	Chosen
2	Franco P.	You must nominate one HouseGuest for eviction.	Juan
2	Franco P.	You must ban one HouseGuest from nominating this week.	Eduardo
4	Manuel	You must nominate one HouseGuest for eviction.	Cinzia
4	Manuel	You must ban 11 HouseGuests from nominating.	Catalina, Cinzia, Danelik, Daniela, Eduardo, Emanuel, Jennifer, Juan, Luana, Solange, Yisela
5	Martín	You must nominate three HouseGuests for eviction. (Note: The three HouseGuests who are nominated for eviction, will also be banned from nominating this week.)	Jennifer, Juan, Lola T.
6	Martín	You must nominate two HouseGuests for eviction. (Note: The two HouseGuests who are nominated for eviction, will also be banned from nominating this week.)	Andrea, Jessica
6	Martín	You must give immunity to one HouseGuest.	Brian
7	~~Nazareno~~; ~~Catalina~~; Martín	You must give two HouseGuests the power to nominate one HouseGuest for eviction as well as banning five HouseGuests from nominating. (Note: The one HouseGuest who is nominated will also be banned from nominating.)	Brian, Emanuel; Nominates: Catalina; Banned: Daniele, Lola P., Manuel, Nazareno, Yisela
8	Juan	You must nominate two HouseGuests for eviction. (Note: The two HouseGuests who are nominated for eviction, will also be banned from nominating this week.)	Franco Z., Martín
9	~~Luana~~; Manuel	You must give immunity to two HouseGuests. (Note: The two HouseGuests who are immune will not nominate this week.)	Emanuel, Nazareno
9	~~Luana~~; Manuel	You must nominate one HouseGuest for eviction. (Note: The HouseGuest who is nominated for eviction, will also be banned from nominating this week.)	Tamara
10	Tamara	You must give one HouseGuest the power to nominate two HouseGuests for eviction. (Note: The two HouseGuests who are nominated, will also be banned from nominating this week. The HoH and the nominator will not make any further nominations as a result of this power.)	Nominator: Manuel; Nominates: Emanuel, Luana
11	Catalina	You must ban two HouseGuests from nominating.	Cinzia, Emanuel
11	Catalina	Choose two HouseGuests to have the power to nominate three HouseGuests for eviction.	Lola P., Manuel
14	Emanuel	You have won an advantage for the car challenge.	none
14	Emanuel	You must ban one HouseGuest from competing in the car challenge. (Note: The HouseGuest who is banned from car challenge will also be banned from nominating this week.)	Manuel
15	Catalina	You must save one nominee and nominate another HouseGuest in their place.	Saves: Tamara; Nominates: Andrea
16	Sebastián	You must nominate two additional HouseGuests for eviction.	Alejandra, Andrea
16	Sebastián	You must to void one HouseGuest's two point vote and void one HouseGuest's one point vote. (Note: The voided two point vote will be a red card, while the voided one point vote will be a yellow card.)	Red card: Leandro; Yellow card: Yisela
17	Matías	You must ban four HouseGuests from nominating this week.	Alejandra, Juan Carlos, Leandro, Mariela
17	Matías	You must save one of the nominees.	Nerea
18	Juan Carlos	You must nominate one additional HouseGuest for eviction.	Charlotte
20	Juan	You must ban one HouseGuest from nominating this week. (Note: The HouseGuest that is ban from nominating will not compete in the next HOH competition if they survive eviction. Furthermore, the banned HouseGuest will instantly nominate one additional HouseGuest for eviction.)	Solange
22	Steffany	You must ban four HouseGuests from nominating this week.	Alejandra, Matías, Tamara, Yisela
23	Jennifer	You can view three of your fellow HouseGuests nominations.	Luana, Matías, Steffany
24	Yisela	You can view three of your fellow HouseGuests nominations.	Matías, Solange, Yanina
25	Yisela	You must nominate one HouseGuest for eviction.	Solange
25	Yisela	You will vote with three and two points	Alejandra, Mariela
26	Luana	Your vote will count as doubled.	Mariela
27	Jennifer	You will have one additional point to nominate this week.	Mariela

==== The Golden Phone ====
Starting in Week 5, Gran Hermano enabled the Golden Phone. Similar to the Red Phone in seasons 11 and 12, whoever answered the Golden Phone would receive positive or negative information. The HouseGuests must answer the phone without being able to repeat it during the day and if the phone is not answered before five rings the whole house would be punished.

Week	Call	Message	Answered by	Chosen
5	1	You must choose 10 HouseGuests to not take part in the weekly party. (Note: Whoever answers the phone will also not attend the weekly party.)	Brian	Andrea, Franco P., Jennifer, Jessica, Juan, Lola P., Lola T., Manuel, Nazareno, Yisela
6	2	You must choose two HouseGuests to have a romantic dinner together.	Cinzia	Andrea, Brian
18	3	You are nominated. (Note: Whoever answers the phone will also be banned from nominating this week. They will also choose one HouseGuest. Unaware, that the HouseGuest they choose, will receive immunity from eviction this week.)	Emanuel	Solange
23	4	You are banned from nominating this week. (Note: Whoever answers the phone must also choose one person (HouseGuest or Vistor). Unaware, they will be also banned from nominating this week.)	Yanina	Selva
26	5	Next week, you will watch all of your fellow HouseGuests nominations.	Yanina (Martín)	none

==== Housemate exchange ====
On 8 April 2026, a housemate exchange with La casa de los famosos USA was announced. Solange Abraham is set to be swapped with Fabio Agostini from La Casa de los Famosos season 6.

==== The voided votes ====
In weeks 10-27, the last evicted HouseGuest has the power to void any of the remaining HouseGuests' votes before they nominate in the Nominations Gala.

==== Golden Ticket ====
During week 10, Solange was ejected from the house. As a result of this, the Golden Ticket was enabled. Gran Hermano randomly chose one evicted HouseGuest to return to the House in Solange's place. He chose Cinzia to re-enter the house. During the 13th eviction gala, it was announced that two more Golden Tickets would be given during the re-entry gala. Brian received one of those Golden Tickets while Andrea received the other ticket. Gran Hermano gave an extra Golden Ticket to Carmiña, however her re-entry was voided by Jenny as Carmiña made racial comments about Jenny while still in the house at the time. During Week 14, Gran Hermano re-enabled the Golden Ticket following Lola T.’s removal from the house for sharing information from the outside world. It was announced on Day 98 that Solange would re-enter the house.

==== Repechage ====
During week 10, the repechage was announced. It began on 17 May with the results being announced on 20 May. All evicted HouseGuests from this season were eligible to return to the house. This includes those who left the house and those who were removed by Gran Hermano. During the 13th eviction gala, the HouseGuests had to decide if they want to re-enter the house or not. All HouseGuests, except Andrea, Daniela, Divina, Gabriel and Solange decided to take part in the repechage.

==== Special Guests ====
During Week 22, seven former HouseGuests temporarily entered the house along with La casa de los famosos USA 6 winner Fabio Agostini to take part in nominations. Throughout their stay, Gran Hermano will evict them one by one till only three visitors remain. During Week 24, the HouseGuests had to choose which of the three remaining visitors will not nominate, unaware that the visitor they chose will leave last and have the power to nominate one HouseGuest for the Week 24 eviction.

==== Ex-HouseGuests ====
In Week 25, the remaining HouseGuests had to choose one Ex-HouseGuests to be their partner. The last Ex-HouseGuests standing will win a trip to Bariloche. The pairs were:

- Alejandra and Jenny
- Charlotte and Sebastián
- Jennifer and Brian
- Luana and Danelik
- Mariela and Steffany
- Solange and Tomás
- Tamara and Nazareno
- Yanina and Martín
- Yisela and Catalina

On Day 198, Yisela and Catalina won the final challenge, meaning Catalina won the trip to Bariloche.

== HouseGuests ==
A total of 18 HouseGuests moved into the house on Day 1 (23 February 2026). An additional 10 new HouseGuests moved into the house on Day 2 (24 February 2026). After Daniela de Lucía and Divina Gloria had to leave the house on Day 3, on Day 7 (1 March 2026) Daniela re-entered the house and Carla Bigliani entered to replace Divina. Due to the ejection of Carmiña on Day 17 (11 March 2026), another new HouseGuest (Jessica Maciel) entered the house on Day 21 (15 March 2026) to replace the former. On Day 29, Andrea del Boca returned to the game after leaving five days prior in order to seek medical attention.

Four of the HouseGuests previously participated in other editions of the show: Eduardo Carrera was a HouseGuest during season 3, Emanuel Di Gioia and Solange Abraham during season 6, and Jennifer Torres finished in third place on season 1 of Gran Hermano Chile.

Name	Age	Occupation	Residence	Day entered	Day exited	Status
Solange Abraham Gran Hermano season 6	37	Housewife	Tucuman, Argentina	2	66	Ejected
Solange Abraham Gran Hermano season 6	37	Housewife	Tucuman, Argentina	98	206	Winner
Yisela Pintos	40	Comedian	Montevideo, Uruguay	1	73	Walked
Yisela Pintos	40	Comedian	Montevideo, Uruguay	87	206	Runner-up
Charlotte Caniggia Gran Hermano VIP season 4	33	Reality Personality	Buenos Aires	87	204	Third place
Luana Fernández	28	Model	José C. Paz, Buenos Aires	2	199	Fourth place
Yanina Zilli	57	Former vedette	Arequito, Santa Fe	2	197	Fifth place
Mariela Prieto	48	Housewife	Buenos Aires	87	192	Sixth place
Jennifer Galvarini Gran Hermano Chile season 1	50	Nurse	Ancud, Chile	1	190	Evicted
Tamara Paganini Gran Hermano season 1	52	Actress	Buenos Aires	36	183	Evicted
Alejandra Majluf	59	Comedian	Buenos Aires	100	176	Evicted
Matías Hanssen	36	Entrepreneur	Buenos Aires	87	169	Evicted
Juan Caruso	26	Actor	Moreno, Buenos Aires	1	165	Walked
Steffany Pereira	29	Influencer	Foz do Iguaçu, Brazil	87	162	Evicted
Cinzia Francischiello	31	Social communicator	Valencia, Venezuela	2	43	Evicted
Cinzia Francischiello	31	Social communicator	Valencia, Venezuela	66	158	Walked
Sebastián Cola	41	Events Planner	Buenos Aires	87	155	Evicted
Emanuel Di Gioia Gran Hermano season 6	41	Mechanic	San Martín, Buenos Aires	1	148	Evicted
Juan Carlos López	46	Stripper	Buenos Aires	87	144	Evicted
Manuel Ibero	24	Law student	Zárate, Buenos Aires	1	141	Evicted
Andrea del Boca	60	Actress	Buenos Aires	1	43	Walked
Andrea del Boca	60	Actress	Buenos Aires	87	136	Walked
Leandro Nigro	25	Influencer	Zárate, Buenos Aires	87	134	Evicted
Nerea López	23	Influencer	Galicia, Spain	87	127	Evicted
Catalina Tcherkaski	23	MEM student	Núñez, Buenos Aires	1	120	Evicted
Franco Zunino	23	Personal trainer	Berazategui, Buenos Aires	2	113	Evicted
Brian Sarmiento	35	Former footballer	Rosario, Santa Fe	1	64	Evicted
Brian Sarmiento	35	Former footballer	Rosario, Santa Fe	87	106	Evicted
Tatiana Luna	26	Law Student	Montevideo, Uruguay	87	99	Evicted
Gladys Jiménez	61	Singer	San Miguel de Tucumán, Tucumán	64	98	Walked
Eduardo Carrera Gran Hermano season 3	56	Dental assistant	Lomas de Zamora, Buenos Aires	1	92	Evicted
Lola Tomaszewski	20	Influencer	Bariloche, Río Negro	2	50	Evicted
Lola Tomaszewski	20	Influencer	Bariloche, Río Negro	87	92	Ejected
Danelik Galazan	25	Influencer	Juan Bautista Alberdi, Tucumán	1	84	Evicted
Grecia Colmenares Grande Fratello season 17	63	Actress	Valencia, Venezuela	50	80	Evicted
Lola Poggio	19	Actress	Villa Devoto, Buenos Aires	1	80	Evicted
Daniela de Lucía	45	Writer	Tandil, Buenos Aires	1	3	Walked
Daniela de Lucía	45	Writer	Tandil, Buenos Aires	7	78	Evicted
Nazareno Pompei	27	Former footballer	Lomas de Zamora, Buenos Aires	2	71	Evicted
Martín Rodríguez	46	CrossFit athlete	Martín Coronado, Buenos Aires	2	57	Evicted
Jessica Maciel	47	Influencer	Buenos Aires	21	57	Walked
Franco Poggio	24	Psychology student	San Juan, San Juan	2	36	Evicted
Jenny Mavinga	40	Hairdresser	La Plata, Buenos Aires	1	31	Walked
Kennys Palacios	36	Stylist	San Fernando, Buenos Aires	2	29	Evicted
Nicolás Sícaro	33	Singer	Villa Domínico, Buenos Aires	1	22	Evicted
Carla Bigliani	48	Designer	Villa Adelina, Buenos Aires	7	18	Evicted
Carmiña Masi	39	Journalist	Asunción, Paraguay	1	17	Ejected
Tomás Riguera	18	Footballer	Núñez, Buenos Aires	1	15	Evicted
Gabriel Lucero	51	Drawer	Avellaneda, Buenos Aires	1	8	Evicted
Divina Gloria (Note: Stage name. Born as Martha Gloria Goldsztern.)	64	Actress	Buenos Aires	1	3	Walked

=== Special guests ===
Name	Information	Day entered	Day exited
Selva Pérez	Season 12 housemate	149	165
Juliana Díaz	Season 10 housemate	149	165
Emmanuel Vich	Season 11 runner-up	149	165
Juan Pablo De Vigili	Season 12 housemate	149	162
Ariel Ansaldo	Season 10 housemate	149	161
Romina Uhrig	Season 10 housemate	149	155
Daniela Celia	Season 10 housemate	149	151
Fabio Agostini	La casa de los famosos USA 6 winner	149	151

== Episodes ==
No. overall	No. in season	Title	Day(s)	Original release date	HH rating (Note: Audience averages are measured only in the Greater Buenos Aires area, according to data from Kantar Ibope Media. Episodes are split into two parts as a business strategy to avoid lowering the final average measurement, allowing the main and most-watched segment to maintain a high audience number compared to the competition.)
Week 1
444	1	"Premiere (Part 1)"	Day 1	23 February 2026	17.0 (part 1) 14.8 (part 2)
Eighteen HouseGuests were presented to the public and entered the house on Day 1.
445	2	"Premiere (Part 2)"	Day 2	24 February 2026	14.4 (part 1) 13.0 (part 2)
Ten more HouseGuests were presented to the public and entered the house on Day 2.
446	3	"1st Nomination Gala"	Days 1–3	25 February 2026	15.4 (part 1) 13.4 (part 2)
On Day 3, Brian, Carmiña, Emanuel, Gabriel, Jennifer, Manuel, Solange and Yanina were nominated by received the most votes from the HouseGuests. Daniela left the house due to the death of her father, and Divina was evacuated from the house due to health reasons.
447	4	"1st Eviction Gala"	Days 4–8	2 March 2026	14.1 (part 1) 12.4 (part 2)
On Day 4, Carmiña, Jennifer and Manuel received the most votes to remain in the house. On Day 8, Emanuel, Solange and Brian were saved by the public, and Gabriel became the first evicted after facing Yanina.
Week 2
448	5	"2nd Nomination Gala"	Days 9–10	4 March 2026	11.4 (part 1) 10.3 (part 2)
On Day 9, as Franco P. won the HoH competition, he got two Super Powers. He chose to nominate Juan without the possibility of being saved and chose Eduardo to be banned from nominating. On the next day, during the Plants Up for Nomination, Catalina, Cinzia, Eduardo, Franco Z., Juan, Martín, Nazareno, Tomás and Yisela were the most voted to be up for eviction.
449	6	"2nd Eviction Gala"	Days 11–15	9 March 2026	14.2 (part 1) 11.4 (part 2)
One day after nomination (Day 11), Juan and Yisela were saved with the fewest votes, while the other nominated HouseGuests remained up for eviction. On Day 15, Cinzia, Franco Z., Nazareno, Eduardo and Martín were saved by the public, and Tomás was finally evicted as a plant after facing Catalina.
Week 3
450	7	"3rd Eviction Gala (Part 1)"	Days 16–18	12 March 2026	14.1 (part 1) 11.6 (part 2)
After the previous eviction, it was announced that all HouseGuests would be nominated. On Day 16, Lola T. won the HoH competition and therefore she would be exempted from being up for eviction. On Day 17, Carmiña was ejected by Gran Hermano due to making racist remarks behind Jenny's back. On the next day, after receiving the fewest votes, Carla was evicted from the house.
451	8	"3rd Eviction Gala (Part 2)"	Days 19–22	16 March 2026	15.4 (part 1) 11.3 (part 2)
On Day 21, a new HouseGuest (Jessica) entered the house to replace Carmiña. On the next day, Nicolás was evicted from the house after facing Martín.
Week 4
452	9	"3rd Nomination Gala"	Days 23–24	18 March 2026	14.8 (part 1) 10.2 (part 2)
As Manuel won the HoH competition, he won the power to nominate one HouseGuest for eviction without the possibility of being saved, choosing Cinzia, and also chose 11 HouseGuests to ban from nominating. On Day 24, due to multiple HouseGuests discussing nominations, all nominations were voided and all HouseGuests (including Manuel as HoH) were put up for eviction.
453	10	"4th Eviction Gala"	Days 25–29	23 March 2026	10.7 (part 1) 8.1 (part 2)
Week 5
454	11	"4th Nomination Gala"	Days 30–31	25 March 2026	12.0 (part 1) 9.5 (part 2)
455	12	"5th Eviction Gala"	Days 32–36	30 March 2026	13.5 (part 1) 10.2 (part 2)
On Day 36, after Lola T., and Yanina were saved, Franco P. was evicted against Brian. Also, Tamara entered the house in place of Jenny after she decided to walk out.
Week 6
456	13	"5th Nomination Gala"	Days 37–38	1 April 2026	12.6 (part 1) 11.0 (part 2)
As Martín won the HoH competition, he gave two power votes to Andrea and Jessica and gave immunity to Brian. On Day 38, during nominations, Franco Z., Luana, and Martín votes were voided, and Cinzia, Eduardo, Lola T., Manuel, Yanina and Yisela were up for eviction.
457	14	"6th Eviction Gala"	Days 39–43	6 April 2026	13.5 (part 1) 10.9 (part 2)
After Andrea, Eduardo and Manuel were saved days prior, on Day 43 Cinzia was evicted against Yisela, with Lola T., Yanina and Yessica being previously saved during that night. On the same day, Andrea left the house due to health reasons.
Week 7
458	15	"6th Nomination Gala"	Days 44–45	8 April 2026	13.5 (part 1) 10.4 (part 2)
On Day 44, Nazareno was crowned as the new HoH but was later removed due to discussing the possible superpowers he might get, with Martín taking over as the new HoH. He gave powers to Brian and Emanuel, who nominated Catalina for eviction and banned Daniela, Lola P., Manuel, Nazareno and Yisela from nominating. On Day 45, Brian, Daniela, Jessica, Lola T., Manuel, Nazareno and Solange were also nominated. Jennifer was previously nominated due to a previous punishment, and Solange's nomination was postponed as she would leave due to an exchange with La Casa de los Famosos.
459	16	"7th Eviction Gala"	Days 46–50	13 April 2026	14.0 (part 1) 10.5 (part 2)
Week 8
460	17	"7th Nomination Gala"	Days 51–52	15 April 2026	11.6 (part 1) 7.6 (part 2)
461	18	"8th Eviction Gala"	Days 53–57	20 April 2026	13.9 (part 1) 10.9 (part 2)
Week 9
462	19	"8th Nomination Gala"	Days 58–59	22 April 2026	13.4 (part 1) 10.2 (part 2)
During Day 58, Solange returned from the exchange with La Casa de los Famosos. On the next day, Brian, Danelik, Daniela,Eduardo, Franco Z., Solange, Tamara (by the HoH), Yanina and Yisela were up for eviction.
463	20	"9th Eviction Gala"	Days 60–64	27 April 2026	14.6 (part 1) 10.3 (part 2)
On Day 60, Daniela, Eduardo, Tamara and Yanina were saved from eviction by receiving the fewest votes. During the eviction gala on Day 64, Gladys entered the house, Franco Z., Danelik and Solange were saved, and Brian was evicted after facing Yisela.
Week 10
464	21	"9th Nomination Gala"	Days 65–66	29 April 2026	13.0 (part 1) 9.9 (part 2)
465	22	"10th Eviction Gala"	Days 67–71	4 May 2026	13.9 (part 1) 10.3 (part 2)
Week 11
466	23	"10th Nomination Gala"	Days 72–73	6 May 2026	13.1 (part 1) 9.6 (part 2)
467	24	"11th Eviction Gala"	Days 74–78	11 May 2026	13.9 (part 1) 10.7 (part 2)
Week 12
468	25	"12th Eviction and 11th Nomination Gala"	Days 79–80	13 May 2026	11.1 (part 1) 9.1 (part 2)
469	26	"13th Eviction Gala"	Days 81–84	17 May 2026	13.4 (part 1) 10.6 (part 2)
Week 13
470	27	"Re-Entry Gala"	Day 87	20 May 2026	12.9 (part 1) 8.9 (part 2)
Nine new HouseGuests were presented to the public and entered the house on Day 87. Also, Andrea, Brian, Lola T. and Yisela returned to the house.
471	28	"12th Nomination Gala"	Days 85–88	21 May 2026	10.3 (part 1) 7.9 (part 2)
472	29	"14th Eviction Gala"	Days 89–92	25 May 2026	12.3 (part 1) 9.3 (part 2)
Week 14
473	30	"13th Nomination Gala"	Days 93–94	27 May 2026	12.2 (part 1) 8.3 (part 2)
474	31	"15th Eviction Gala"	Days 95–99	1 June 2026	12.7 (part 1) 9.8 (part 2)
Week 15
475	32	"14th Nomination Gala"	Days 100–101	3 June 2026	13.5 (part 1) 11.1 (part 2)
476	33	"16th Eviction Gala"	Days 102–106	8 June 2026	13.1 (part 1) 9.9 (part 2)
Week 16
478	35	"17th Eviction Gala"	Days 107–113	15 June 2026	11.9 (part 1) 8.4 (part 2)
Week 17
479	36	"18th Eviction Gala"	Days 114–120	22 June 2026	12.4 (part 1) 8.7 (part 2)
Week 18
480	37	"15th Nomination Gala"	Days 121–122	24 June 2026	10.7 (part 1) 8.1 (part 2)
481	38	"19th Eviction Gala"	Days 123–127	29 June 2026	11.8 (part 1) 8.9 (part 2)
Week 19
482	49	"20th Eviction Gala"	Days 128–134	6 July 2026	9.3 (part 1) 6.6 (part 2)
Week 20
483	50	"16th Nomination Gala"	Days 135–136	8 July 2026	12.3 (part 1) 9.3 (part 2)
484	51	"21st Eviction Gala"	Days 137–141	13 July 2026	12.6 (part 1) 9.8 (part 2)
Week 21
485	52	"22nd Eviction and 17th Nomination Gala"	Days 142–144	16 July 2026	9.5 (part 1) 7.7 (part 2)
486	53	"23rd Eviction Gala"	Days 145–148	20 July 2026	10.9 (part 1) 9.0 (part 2)
Week 22
487	54	"18th Nomination Gala"	Days 149–150	22 July 2026	9.1 (part 1) 8.9 (part 2)
488	55	"24th Eviction Gala"	Days 151–155	27 July 2026	12.1 (part 1) 10.1 (part 2)
Week 23
489	56	"19th Nomination Gala"	Days 156–157	29 July 2026	10.0 (part 1) 8.3 (part 2)
490	57	"25th Eviction Gala"	Days 158–162	3 August 2026	11.8 (part 1) 9.8 (part 2)
Week 24
491	58	"20th Nomination Gala"	Days 163–164	5 August 2026	11.1 (part 1) 8.7 (part 2)
492	59	"26th Eviction Gala"	Days 165–169	10 August 2026	11.8 (part 1) 8.9 (part 2)
Week 25
493	60	"21st Nomination Gala"	Days 170–171	12 August 2026	11.0 (part 1) 8.0 (part 2)
494	61	"27th Eviction Gala"	Days 172–176	17 August 2026	10.6 (part 1) 8.1 (part 2)
Week 26
495	62	"28th Eviction Gala"	Days 177–183	24 August 2026	10.8
496	63	"29th Eviction Gala"	Days 184–190	31 August 2026	10.7 (part 1) 8.5 (part 2)
Week 27
497	64	"30th Eviction Gala"	Days 191–192	2 September 2026	10.1 (part 1) 7.3 (part 2)
498	65	"31st Eviction Gala"	Days 193–197	7 September 2026	11.0 (part 1) 8.3 (part 2)
Week 28
499	66	"32nd Eviction Gala"	Days 198–199	9 September 2026	11.5 (part 1) 8.6 (part 2)
500	67	"Third Place Eviction Gala"	Days 200–204	14 September 2026	11.6 (part 1) 7.9 (part 2)
On Day 204, Charlotte was evicted from the house after receiving the fewest number of votes, finishing in third place.
Week 29
501	68	"Final Gala"	Days 205–206 Various (Note: In the final episode, the HouseGuests that made it to the finale looked back over their time in the house. Flashbacks include clips from previous days in the house.)	16 September 2026	12.5 (part 1) 9.2 (part 2)
After 206 days, Solange was crowned the winner of the season, with Yisela as the runner-up.

== Voting history ==
HouseGuests nominate for two and one points, shown in descending order in the nomination box. The six or more HouseGuests with the most nomination points face the public vote.

HouseGuests can also use the Diary Room's Special Nomination, which gives three and two points instead.

From Weeks 2-9, the last evicted HouseGuest is given the power to give another one three votes to use during nominations. The person who received this power will nominate with three, two and one points instead of the usual two and one points.

Starting in Week 9, The Power Nomination (fulminante in Spanish) was enabled by Gran Hermano, which consists of the automatic nomination of a HouseGuest, without the ability to be saved by the Head of Household. It could only be used once by each HouseGuest throughout those weeks. HouseGuests that use the Power Nomination are marked in bold.

From Weeks 10-27, the last evicted HouseGuest is given the power to void any of the remaining HouseGuests' votes before they nominate in the Nominations Gala.

From Weeks 25-27, the Head of Household was no longer immune from eviction.

Color key:

Winner
Runner-up
Other finalists
Head of Household
Nominated for eviction
Immune from eviction
Not eligible to vote
Evicted
Walked
Ejected by Gran Hermano
Received Power Vote
Special Nomination

Voting history (season 13)
	Week 1	Week 2	Week 3	Week 4	Week 5	Week 6	Week 7	Week 8	Week 9	Week 10	Week 11	Week 12		Week 13		Week 14	Week 15	Week 16	Week 17	Week 18	Week 19	Week 20	Week 21		Week 22	Week 23	Week 24	Week 25	Week 26	Week 27	Week 28		Week 29		Week 30	Nomination points received
	Week 1	Week 2	Week 3	Week 4	Week 5	Week 6	Week 7	Week 8	Week 9	Week 10	Week 11	Day 78	Day 80	Day 84	Day 88	Week 14	Week 15	Week 16	Week 17	Week 18	Week 19	Week 20	Day 141	Day 144	Week 22	Week 23	Week 24	Week 25	Week 26	Week 27	Day 190	Day 192	Day 197	Finale		Nomination points received
Head(s) of Household	none	Franco P.	Lola T.	Manuel	Martín	Martín	~~Nazareno~~; ~~Catalina~~; Martín	Juan	~~Luana~~; Manuel	Tamara	Catalina	none		Catalina		Emanuel	Catalina	Sebastián	Matías	Juan Carlos	none	Juan	none		Steffany	Jennifer	Yisela	Yisela	Luana	Jennifer	none					Nomination points received
Power Vote	none	Yisela	none	~~Daniela~~; ~~Lola P.~~; ~~Nazareno~~	Catalina	Lola P.	Solange	Manuel	Yanina	none																										Nomination points received
Votes Voided	none									Nazareno	Danelik	none	Eduardo	none	Luana	Catalina	Andrea	Catalina	Solange	Charlotte	none	~~Solange~~; Steffany	none	Yanina	Cinzia; Solange	Solange	Solange	none	Tamara	Solange	none					Nomination points received
Solange	Carmiña, Catalina	Martín, Jenny	No nominations	Banned	Jessica, Manuel	Yisela, Lola T.	Daniela, Nazareno, Lola T.	Exempt	Franco Z, Yanina	Ejected (Day 66)							Not eligible	Franco Z., Yisela	~~Emanuel,~~; ~~Yisela~~	Manuel, Nerea	No nominations	Banned	No nominations	Emanuel, Yisela	~~Yisela,~~; ~~Juan~~	~~Steffany,~~; ~~Luana~~	~~Tamara,~~; ~~Luana~~	Luana	Yisela	~~Yisela~~	No nominations	No nominations	No nominations	No nominations	**Winner** (Day 206)	57
Yisela	Carmiña, Jennifer	Eduardo, Franco Z., Luana	No nominations	Banned	Cinzia, Solange	Solange, Cinzia	Banned	Eduardo, Brian	Franco Z., Danelik	Eduardo, Grecia	Walked (Day 73)				Not eligible	Cinzia, Franco Z.	Tamara, Brian	Solange, ~~Emanuel~~	Cinzia, Steffany	Cinzia, Matías	No nominations	Solange, Luana	No nominations	Yanina, Emanuel	Banned	Matías, Alejandra	**Charlotte**	Alejandra (3), Mariela (2)	Solange	Solange	No nominations	No nominations	No nominations	No nominations	**Runner-up** (Day 206)	72
Charlotte	Not in House														Not eligible	Cinzia, Catalina	Brian, Solange	Solange, Leandro	Catalina, Manuel	~~Manuel,~~; ~~Juan~~	No nominations	Tamara, Juan Carlos	No nominations	Emanuel, Cinzia	Jennifer, Solange	Solange, Yanina	Solange, Yanina	Yanina	Solange	Solange	No nominations	No nominations	No nominations	No nominations	**Third place** (Day 204)	10
Luana	Carmiña, Juan	Cinzia, Yisela	No nominations	Banned	Franco P. Manuel	~~Nazareno,~~; ~~Lola T.~~	Nazareno, Lola T.	Jessica, Nazareno	Yisela, Daniela	Banned	Danelik, Daniela	No nominations	Danelik, Juan	No nominations	~~Gladys,~~; ~~Matías~~	Catalina, Gladys	Banned	Franco Z., Catalina	Catalina, Manuel	Nerea, Manuel	No nominations	Solange, Alejandra	No nominations	Yisela, Emanuel	Tamara, Juan	Solange, Matías	Solange, Alejandra	Yanina (4)	Mariela (4)	Mariela	No nominations	No nominations	No nominations	**Fourth place** (Day 199)		45
Yanina	Solange, Emanuel	Kennys, Yisela	No nominations	~~Daniela,~~; ~~Yisela~~	Daniela, Catalina	Solange, Cinzia	Daniela, Nazareno	Jessica, Tamara	Yisela, Daniela, Catalina	Catalina, Nazareno	Luana, Tamara	No nominations	Cinzia, Tamara	No nominations	Tamara, Juan	Gladys, Tamara	Banned	Tamara, Yisela	Tamara, Catalina	Yisela, Cinzia	No nominations	Yisela, Manuel	No nominations	~~Tamara,~~; ~~Cinzia~~	Tamara, Yisela	Banned	Juan, Matías	Yisela, Tamara	Yisela	Yisela	No nominations	No nominations	**Fifth place** (Day 197)			49
Mariela	Not in House														Not eligible	Cinzia, Leandro	Tamara, Yisela	Solange, Steffany	Banned	Yisela, Juan	No nominations	Matías, Alejandra	No nominations	Sebastián, Matías	Alejandra, Sebastián	Alejandra, Matías	Juan, Matías	Charlotte	Jennifer	Luana	No nominations	**Sixth place** (Day 192)				39
Jennifer	Martín, Nicolás	Yisela, Eduardo	No nominations	Banned	Banned	Cinzia, Emanuel	Banned	Danelik, Brian	Brian, Eduardo	Yanina, Franco Z.	Daniela, Tamara	No nominations	Yanina, Tamara	No nominations	Juan Carlos, Sebastián	Tatiana, Mariela	Banned	Franco Z., Leandro	Emanuel, Alejandra	Manuel, Matías	No nominations	Juan Carlos, Matías	No nominations	Emanuel, Sebastián	Matías, Sebastián	Matías, Steffany	Matías, Juan	Tamara	Tamara	Charlotte, Mariela	Evicted (Day 190)					18
Tamara	Not in House					Not eligible	Nazareno, Juan	Nazareno, Jessica	Banned	Head of Household	Franco Z., Luana	No nominations	Gladys, Eduardo	No nominations	Mariela, Steffany	Gladys, Cinzia	Emanuel, Yisela	Emanuel, Luana	Manuel, Yisela	Yisela, Nerea	No nominations	Luana, Alejandra	No nominations	Sebastián, Luana	Banned	Cinzia, Alejandra	Jennifer, Solange	Alejandra	~~Luana~~	Evicted (Day 183)						59
Alejandra	Not in House																Not eligible	Steffany, Leandro	Banned	Matías, Steffany	No nominations	Luana, Solange	No nominations	Yisela, Juan	Banned	Juan, Tamara	Matías, Tamara	Tamara	Evicted (Day 176)							35
Matías	Not in House														Not eligible	Leandro, Juan	Banned	Catalina, Yisela	Catalina, Cinzia	Leandro, Steffany	No nominations	Steffany, Emanuel	No nominations	Steffany, Yanina	Banned	~~Steffany,~~; ~~Yisela~~	Alejandra, Solange	Evicted (Day 169)								42
Juan	Manuel, Martín	Cinzia, Nazareno	No nominations	Banned	Banned	Franco Z., Yanina	Solange, Brian	Tamara (3), Eduardo (2)	Franco Z., Danelik	Franco Z., Eduardo	Danelik, Cinzia	No nominations	Eduardo, Franco Z.	No nominations	Mariela, Eduardo	Franco Z., Tatiana	Brian, Franco Z.	Luana, Tamara	Steffany, Cinzia	Matías, Mariela	No nominations	Mariela, Luana	No nominations	Solange, Luana	Sebastián, Cinzia	Solange, Matías	Alejandra, Solange	Walked (Day 165)								32
Steffany	Not in House														Not eligible	Matías, Tamara	Banned	Leandro, Andrea	Nerea, Catalina	Nerea, Matías	No nominations	~~Matías,~~; ~~Yisela~~	No nominations	Matías, Yisela	Tamara, Matías	~~Solange~~, Matías	Evicted (Day 162)	Tamara	Yanina	Luana	Evicted (Day 162)					37
Cinzia	Manuel, Gabriel	Luana, Nicolás	No nominations	Banned	~~Jenny~~, Jessica	Manuel, Lola T.	Evicted (Day 43)			Not eligible	Banned	No nominations	Emanuel, Franco Z.	No nominations	Steffany, Charlotte	Tatiana, Catalina	Banned	Emanuel, Franco Z.	Emanuel, Luana	Yisela, Nerea	No nominations	Banned	No nominations	Emanuel, Yisela	~~Yisela,~~; ~~Matías~~	Luana, ~~Steffany~~	Walked (Day 158)									76
Sebastián	Not in House														Not eligible	Tatiana, Catalina	Yisela, Leandro	Luana, Catalina	Catalina, Manuel	Juan, Yisela	No nominations	Mariela, Luana	No nominations	Mariela, Juan	Mariela, Jennifer	Evicted (Day 155)		Mariela	Solange	Mariela	Evicted (Day 155)					14
Emanuel	Brian, Yanina	Nazareno, Tomás	No nominations	Banned	Lola P., Nazareno	Catalina, Lola T.	Jessica, Daniela	Danelik, Jessica	Exempt	Banned	Banned	No nominations	Luana, Danelik	No nominations	Matías, Juan	Tamara, Tatiana	Juan, Brian	Cinzia, Yisela	Cinzia, Catalina	Banned	No nominations	Manuel, Yisela	No nominations	Solange, Yisela	Evicted (Day 148)											49
Juan Carlos	Not in House														Not eligible	Cinzia, Franco Z.	Franco Z., Juan	Nerea, Cinzia	Banned	Charlotte, Steffany	No nominations	Alejandra, Luana	No nominations	Evicted (Day 144)												5
Manuel	Jennifer, Cinzia	Carla, Eduardo	No nominations	~~Eduardo,~~; ~~Emanuel~~	Luana, Danelik	Yanina, Cinzia	Banned	Tamara, Danelik, Eduardo	Eduardo, Franco Z.	**Emanuel**; **Luana**	Danelik, Cinzia, Luana	No nominations	Danelik, Franco Z.	No nominations	Eduardo, Franco Z.	Banned	Brian, Franco Z.	Cinzia, Franco Z.	Steffany, Leandro	Steffany, Cinzia	No nominations	Mariela, Luana	Evicted (Day 141)													39
Andrea	Carmiña, Yanina	Tomás, Nazareno	No nominations	~~Yanina,~~; ~~Danelik~~	Not eligible	Banned	Walked (Day 43)								Not eligible	Tatiana, Gladys	~~Solange,~~; ~~Brian~~	Cinzia, Steffany	Solange, Sebastián	Banned	No nominations	Walked (Day 136)														4
Leandro	Not in House														Not eligible	Cinzia, Matías	Solange, Brian	~~Steffany,~~; Solange	Banned	Steffany, Cinzia	No nominations	Evicted (Day 134)														15
Nerea	Not in House														Not eligible	Cinzia, Gladys	Steffany, Cinza	Steffany, Cinza	Steffany, Cinza	Mariela, Yisela	Evicted (Day 127)															11
Catalina	Eduardo, Carmiña	Eduardo, Andrea	No nominations	Banned	Yanina, Franco Z., Brian	Cinzia, Yanina	Banned	Nazareno, Danelik	Grecia, Franco Z.	Eduardo, Franco Z.	Emanuel, Cinzia	No nominations	Danelik, Franco Z.	Head of Household	Eduardo, Gladys	~~Gladys,~~; ~~Cinzia~~	Emanuel, Solange	~~Tamara,~~; ~~Franco Z.~~	Tamara, Steffany	Evicted (Day 120)								Luana	Solange	Solange	Evicted (Day 120)					45
Franco Z.	Carmiña, Jenny	Eduardo, Lola T.	No nominations	~~Daniela,~~; ~~Emanuel~~	Franco P., Daniela	~~Jennifer,~~; ~~Emanuel~~	Nazareno, Lola T.	Banned	Yisela, Juan	Catalina, Eduardo	~~Catalina,~~; ~~Yisela~~	No nominations	Tamara, Juan	No nominations	Matías, Juan	Catalina, Cinzia	Juan, Brian	Cinzia, Steffany	Evicted (Day 113)																	46
Brian	Emanuel, Lola T.	Eduardo, Andrea	No nominations	~~Eduardo,~~; ~~Juan~~	Catalina, Manuel	Nazareno, Manuel	Jessica, Nazareno	Yisela, Jennifer	~~**Jennifer**~~	Evicted (Day 64)					Not eligible	Juan, Catalina	Franco Z., Emanuel	Re-Evicted (Day 106)										Luana	Mariela	Mariela	Re-Evicted (Day 106)					24
Tatiana	Not in House														Not eligible	Leandro, Catalina	Evicted (Day 99)																			10
Gladys	Not in House									Not eligible	Juan, Luana	No nominations	Tamara, Luana	No nominations	Cinzia, Luana	Cinzia, Tamara	Walked (Day 98)																			10
Eduardo	Carmiña, Yanina	Banned	No nominations	Banned	Manuel, Brian	Daniela, Lola T.	Manuel, Daniela	Jessica, Nazareno	Daniela, Catalina	Nazareno, Catalina	Franco Z., Danelik	No nominations	~~Luana,~~; ~~Danelik~~	No nominations	Matías, Cinzia	Evicted (Day 92)																				54
Lola T.	Carmiña, Gabriel	Franco Z., Yisela	Head of Household	~~Emanuel,~~; ~~Solange~~	Banned	Yanina, Eduardo	Brian, Danelik	Evicted (Day 50)							Not eligible	Ejected (Day 92)																				14
Danelik	Divina, Yisela	Catalina, Tomás	No nominations	Banned	Lola P., Catalina	Yisela, Manuel	Jessica, Lola T.	Manuel, Jessica	Manuel, Lola P.	Nazareno, Catalina	~~Tamara,~~; ~~Juan~~	No nominations	Juan, Eduardo	Evicted (Day 84)														Charlotte	Luana	Yanina	Evicted (Day 84)					38
Grecia	Not in House							Not eligible	Yanina, Daniela	Yanina, Danelik	Emanuel, Danelik	No nominations																								5
Lola P.	Carmiña, Franco Z.	Eduardo, Cinzia	No nominations	~~Emanuel,~~; ~~Solange~~	Yanina, Franco Z.	Yanina, Eduardo, Danelik	Banned	Tamara, Danelik	Franco Z., Danelik	Grecia, Franco Z.	Emanuel, Danelik, Cinzia	No nominations	Evicted (Day 80)																							5
Daniela	Carmiña, Manuel	Not eligible	No nominations	Banned	Emanuel, Brian	Cinzia, Yanina	Banned	Eduardo, Tamara	Eduardo, Brian	Eduardo, Danelik	Emanuel, Cinzia	Evicted (Day 78)																								30
Nazareno	Carmiña, Gabriel	Yisela, Andrea	No nominations	~~Emanuel,~~; ~~Yanina,~~; ~~Danelik~~	Luana, Brian	Eduardo, Yanina	Banned	Eduardo, Danelik	Exempt	~~Eduardo,~~; ~~Franco Z.~~	Evicted (Day 71)																	Charlotte	Luana	Evicted (Day 71)						29
Martín	Carmiña, Jennifer	Solange, Lola T.	No nominations	~~Juan,~~; ~~Andrea~~	Manuel, Catalina	~~Lola P.,~~; ~~Yisela~~	Lola T., Daniela	Banned	Evicted (Day 57)																			Yisela	Jennifer	Jennifer	Evicted (Day 57)					6
Jessica	Not in House			Not eligible	Brian, Franco Z.	Banned	Brian, Solange	Brian, Danelik	Walked (Day 57)																											20
Franco P.	Manuel, Carmiña	Yisela, Manuel	No nominations	~~Solange,~~; ~~Emanuel~~	Yanina, Brian	Evicted (Day 36)																														4
Jenny	Solange, Carmiña	Cinzia, Lola T.	No nominations	~~Brian,~~; ~~Emanuel~~	Walked (Day 31)																							Yanina	Walked (Day 31)							2
Kennys	Gabriel, Carmiña	Martín, Cinzia	No nominations	~~Danelik,~~; ~~Emanuel~~	Evicted (Day 29)																															2
Nicolás	Carmiña, Jennifer	Eduardo, Cinzia	No nominations																																	2
Carla	Not in House	Not eligible	No nominations	Evicted (Day 18)																																2
Carmiña	Brian, Emanuel	Catalina, Tomás	No nominations	Ejected (Day 17)																																31
Tomás	Emanuel, Carmiña	Danelik, Yisela	Evicted (Day 15)																									Luana	Jennifer	Jennifer	Evicted (Day 15)					5
Gabriel	Yanina, Nazareno	Evicted (Day 8)																																		5
Divina	Carmiña, Solange	Walked (Day 3)																																		2
Temporary HouseGuests
Selva	Not in House																								Matías, Alejandra	Banned	**Yanina**	Left (Day 165)								N/A
Juliana	Not in House																								Sebastián, Matías	Juan, Steffany	Juan, Matías	Left (Day 165)								N/A
Emmanuel	Not in House																								Juan, Sebastián	Mariela, Alejandra	Alejandra, Mariela	Left (Day 165)								N/A
Juan Pablo	Not in House																								Alejandra, Mariela	Alejandra, Steffany	Left (Day 162)									N/A
Ariel	Not in House																								Mariela, Alejandra	Yanina, Charlotte	Left (Day 161)									N/A
Romina	Not in House																								Tamara, Alejandra	Left (Day 155)										N/A
Daniela C.	Not in House																								Tamara, Alejandra	Left (Day 151)										N/A
Fabio	Not in House							Jessica, Yisela	Left (Day 56)																Mariela, Alejandra	Left (Day 151)										N/A
Notes	1, 2, 3, 4	5, 6, 7	8, 9, 10	8, 11, 12, 13, 14, 15, 16	17, 18, 19,	20, 21, 22, 23	24, 25, 26, 27	27, 28, 29, 30, 31, 32, 33	27, 34, 35, 36	32, 37, 38, 39, 40, 41	42, 43, 44, 45	1, 46	1, 32, 47	48, 49	50	32, 51, 52, 53, 54	32, 55, 56, 57, 58, 59	32, 60	61, 62	32, 63, 64, 65	1, 66	67, 68, 69, 70, 71	1, 8, 72	1	32, 68, 70, 73, 74, 75	75, 76, 77, 78, 79, 80, 81, 82, 83	84, 85, 86, 87	32, 45, 86, 88, 89, 90	86, 91, 92	92, 93, 94	95					
Walked	**Divina**	none			**Jenny**	none	**Andrea**	**Jessica**	none		**Yisela**	none				**Gladys**	none					**Andrea**	none			**Cinzia**	**Juan**	none								
Ejected	none		**Carmiña**	none						**Solange**	none				**Lola T.**	none																				
Against public vote	Brian, Carmiña, Emanuel, Gabriel, Jennifer, Manuel, Solange, Yanina	Catalina, Cinzia, Eduardo, Franco Z., Juan, Martín, Nazareno, Tomás, Yisela	All; HouseGuests except of Lola T.	All; HouseGuests	Brian, Catalina, Franco P., Franco Z., Jennifer, Juan, Lola P., Lola T., Luana, Manuel, Yanina	Andrea, Cinzia, Eduardo, Jessica, Lola T., Manuel, Yanina, Yisela	Brian, Catalina, Daniela, Jennifer, Jessica, Lola T., Manuel, Nazareno, ~~Solange~~	Brian, Danelik, Eduardo, Franco Z., Jessica, Nazareno, Martín, Tamara, Yisela	Brian, Danelik; Daniela, Eduardo, Franco Z., Solange, Tamara, Yanina, Yisela	All; HouseGuests except of Tamara	Cinzia, Danelik, Daniela, Emanuel, Franco Z., Luana	All; HouseGuests	Cinzia, Danelik, Eduardo, Franco Z., Juan, Luana, Tamara	Brian, Carla, Carmiña, Danelik, Franco P., Grecia, Jenny, Jessica, Kennys, Lola P., Lola T., Martín, Nazareno, Nicolás, Tomás, Yisela	Cinzia, Eduardo, Juan, Mariela, Matías, Steffany	Andrea, Brian, Catalina, Cinzia, ~~Gladys~~, Leandro, Manuel, Tamara, Tatiana, Yisela	Andrea, Brian, Emanuel, Franco Z., Juan, Matías, Solange, ~~Tamara~~, Yisela	Alejandra, Andrea, Cinzia, Franco Z., Leandro, Luana, Solange, Steffany, Yisela	Catalina, Cinzia, Emanuel, Manuel, ~~Nerea~~, Solange, Steffany, Tamara	Andrea, Cinzia, Charlotte, Emanuel, Manuel, Matías, Nerea, Steffany, Yisela	All; HouseGuests	Alejandra, Emanuel, Juan Carlos, Luana, Manuel, Mariela, Matías, Solange, Yisela	All; HouseGuests	Emanuel, Matías, Sebastián, Solange, Yanina, Yisela	Alejandra, Jennifer, Juan, Mariela, Matías, Sebastián, Tamara	Alejandra, ~~Cinzia~~, Juan, Luana, Mariela, Matías, Solange, Steffany, Yanina	Alejandra, Charlotte, Jennifer, ~~Juan~~, Matías, Solange, Yanina	Alejandra, Charlotte, Luana, Solange, Tamara, Yanina, Yisela	Jennifer, Luana, Mariela, Solange, Tamara, Yisela	Charlotte, Jennifer, ~~Luana~~, Mariela, ~~Solange~~, Yisela	Charlotte, Luana, Mariela, Solange, Yanina, Yisela	Charlotte, Luana, Solange, Yanina, Yisela	Charlotte, Luana, Solange, Yisela	Charlotte, Solange, Yisela	Solange, Yisela	
Evicted	**Gabriel**; 54.80% to evict (out of 2)	**Tomás**; 59.20% to evict (out of 2)	**Carla**; 1.30% to save (out of 12)	**Kennys**; 33.30% to save (out of 2)	**Franco P.** 57.20% to evict (out of 2)	**Cinzia**; 53.90% to evict (out of 2)	**Lola T.** 52.20% to evict (out of 2)	**Martín**; 54.40% to evict (out of 2)	**Brian**; 54.20% to evict (out of 2)	**Nazareno**; 53.60% to evict (out of 2)	**Daniela**; 52.70% to evict (out of 2)	**Lola P.** 42.20% to evict (out of 3)	**Danelik**; 54.40% to evict (out of 2)	**Yisela**; 35.60% to re-enter (out of 4)	**Eduardo**; 57.70% to evict (out of 2)	**Tatiana**; 71.40% to evict (out of 2)	**Brian**; 89.30% to evict (out of 2)	**Franco Z.** 52.90% to evict (out of 2)	**Catalina**; 51.40% to evict (out of 2)	**Nerea**; 55.80% to evict (out of 2)	**Leandro**; 60.10% to evict (out of 2)	**Manuel**; 51.20% to evict (out of 2)	**Juan Carlos**; Fewest votes to save (out of 5)	**Emanuel**; 55.30% to evict (out of 2)	**Sebastián**; 77.20% to evict (out of 2)	**Steffany**; 53.30% to evict (out of 2)	**Matías**; 58% to evict (out of 2)	**Alejandra**; 57.10% to evict (out of 2)	**Tamara**; 51.10% to evict (out of 2)	**Jennifer**; 58.10% to evict (out of 2)	**Mariela**; 0.60% to win (out of 6)	**Yanina**; 2.10% to win (out of 5)	**Luana**; 6.60% to win (out of 4)	**Charlotte**; 10.70% to win (out of 3)	**Yisela**; 48.20% to win (out of 2)	
Evicted	**Gabriel**; 54.80% to evict (out of 2)	**Tomás**; 59.20% to evict (out of 2)	**Nicolás**; 43.90% to save (out of 2)	**Kennys**; 33.30% to save (out of 2)	**Franco P.** 57.20% to evict (out of 2)	**Cinzia**; 53.90% to evict (out of 2)	**Lola T.** 52.20% to evict (out of 2)	**Martín**; 54.40% to evict (out of 2)	**Brian**; 54.20% to evict (out of 2)	**Nazareno**; 53.60% to evict (out of 2)	**Daniela**; 52.70% to evict (out of 2)	**Grecia**; 35.50% to evict (out of 3)	**Danelik**; 54.40% to evict (out of 2)	**Lola T.** 30.60% to re-enter (out of 4)	**Eduardo**; 57.70% to evict (out of 2)	**Tatiana**; 71.40% to evict (out of 2)	**Brian**; 89.30% to evict (out of 2)	**Franco Z.** 52.90% to evict (out of 2)	**Catalina**; 51.40% to evict (out of 2)	**Nerea**; 55.80% to evict (out of 2)	**Leandro**; 60.10% to evict (out of 2)	**Manuel**; 51.20% to evict (out of 2)	**Juan Carlos**; Fewest votes to save (out of 5)	**Emanuel**; 55.30% to evict (out of 2)	**Sebastián**; 77.20% to evict (out of 2)	**Steffany**; 53.30% to evict (out of 2)	**Matías**; 58% to evict (out of 2)	**Alejandra**; 57.10% to evict (out of 2)	**Tamara**; 51.10% to evict (out of 2)	**Jennifer**; 58.10% to evict (out of 2)	**Mariela**; 0.60% to win (out of 6)	**Yanina**; 2.10% to win (out of 5)	**Luana**; 6.60% to win (out of 4)	**Charlotte**; 10.70% to win (out of 3)	**Yisela**; 48.20% to win (out of 2)	
Saved	**Yanina**; 45.20% (out of 2); **Brian**; 29.80% (out of 3); **Solange**; 19.40% (out of 4); **Emanuel**; 8.40% (out of 5); **Carmiña**; **Jennifer**; **Manuel**; Most votes to save (out of 8)	**Catalina**; 40.80% (out of 2); **Martín**; 10.20% (out of 3); **Eduardo**; 6.70% (out of 4); **Nazareno**; 4.70% (out of 5); **Franco Z.** 4.30% (out of 6); **Cinzia**; 2.90% (out of 7); **Juan**; **Yisela**; Fewest votes (out of 9)	**Martín**; 56.10% (out of 2); **Kennys**; 52.30% (out of 3); **Franco Z.** 36.10% (out of 4); **Brian**; 28.30% (out of 5); **Eduardo**; 23.20% (out of 6); **Danelik**; **Emanuel**; **Franco P.** **Jenny**; **Nazareno**; Most votes (out of 11); **Jennifer**; **Juan**; **Lola P.** **Luana**; **Manuel**; **Yanina**; **Yisela**; Most votes (out of 19); **Andrea**; ~~**Carmiña**~~; **Catalina**; **Cinzia**; **Daniela**; **Solange**; Most votes (out of 25)	**Lola T.** 66.70% (out of 2); **Franco Z.** 51.70% (out of 3); **Luana**; 50.60% (out of 4); **Martín**; 43.10% (out of 5); **Juan**; 35.50% (out of 6); **Nazareno**; 33.30% (out of 7); **Brian**; **Catalina**; **Danelik**; **Eduardo**; **Franco P.** **Jenny**; **Jessica**; **Lola P.** **Manuel**; Most votes (out of 16); **Andrea**; **Cinzia**; **Daniela**; **Emanuel**; **Jennifer**; **Solange**; **Yanina**; **Yisela**; Most votes (out of 24)	**Brian**; 42.80% (out of 2); **Yanina**; 20.10% (out of 3); **Lola T.** 11.90% (out of 4); **Catalina**; **Franco Z.** **Lola P.** **Luana**; Fewest votes (out of 8); **Jennifer**; **Juan**; **Manuel**; Fewest votes (out of 11)	**Yisela**; 46.10% (out of 2); **Lola T.** 26.50% (out of 3); **Yanina**; 17.60% (out of 4); **Jessica**; 6.80% (out of 5); **Andrea**; **Eduardo**; **Manuel**; Fewest votes (out of 8)	**Brian**; 47.80% (out of 2); **Jessica**; 26.90% (out of 3); **Catalina**; **Daniela**; **Jennifer**; **Manuel**; **Nazareno**; Fewest votes (out of 8)	**Nazareno**; 45.60% (out of 2); ~~**Jessica**~~; 16% (out of 3); **Eduardo**; **Franco Z.** **Tamara**; Fewest votes (out of 6); **Brian**; **Danelik**; **Yisela**; Most votes to save (out of 9)	**Yisela**; 45.80% (out of 2); **Solange**; 25.10% (out of 3); **Danelik**; 5.20% (out of 4); **Franco Z.** 2.30% (out of 5); **Daniela**; **Eduardo**; **Tamara**; **Yanina**; Fewest votes (out of 9)	**Danelik**; 46.40% (out of 2); **Eduardo**; 22.10% (out of 3); **Luana**; 14.50% (out of 4); **Grecia**; 7.70% (out of 5); **Catalina**; **Daniela**; **Franco Z.** **Gladys**; **Juan**; Fewest votes (out of 10); **Cinzia**; **Emanuel**; **Jennifer**; **Lolo P.** **Manuel**; **Yanina**; **Yisela**; Most votes to save (out of 17)	**Danelik**; 47.30% (out of 2); **Franco Z.** 18.70% (out of 3); **Emanuel**; 11.90% (out of 4); **Cinzia**; 4.80% (out of 5); **Luana**; Fewest votes (out of 6)	**Franco Z.** 22.30% (out of 3); **Juan**; 16.10% (out of 4); **Catalina**; 13.20% (out of 5); **Eduardo**; 9.60% (out of 6); **Cinzia**; **Danelik**; **Emanuel**; **Gladys**; **Jennifer**; **Luana**; **Manuel**; **Tamara**; **Yanina**; Fewest votes (out of 15)	**Eduardo**; 45.60% (out of 2); **Franco Z.** 13.90% (out of 3); **Cinzia**; 4.30% (out of 4); **Tamara**; 3.70% (out of 5); **Luana**; 2.70% (out of 6); **Juan**; Most votes to save (out of 7)	**Carmiña**; 19.80% (out of 4); **Kennys**; 14.10% (out of 4); **Brian**; **Danelik**; **Nazareno**; **Tomás**; Fewest votes (out of 8); **Jessica**; **Lola P.** **Martín**; **Nicolás**; Fewest votes (out of 12); **Carla**; **Franco P.** **Grecia**; **Jenny**; Fewest votes (out of 16)	**Cinzia**; 42.30% (out of 2); **Juan**; 3.80% (out of 3); **Mariela**; **Matias**; **Steffany**; Fewest votes (out of 6)	**Catalina**; 28.60% (out of 2); **Leandro**; 10.70% (out of 3); **Brian**; 6.40% (out of 4); **Tamara**; 0.40% (out of 5); **Andrea**; **Cinzia**; **Manuel**; **Yisela**; Most votes to save (out of 10)	**Franco Z.** 10.70% (out of 2); **Yisela**; 3.70% (out of 3); **Juan**; 2.40% (out of 4); **Matías**; 0.50% (out of 5); **Andrea**; **Emanuel**; **Solange**; Most votes to save (out of 8)	**Steffany**; 47.10% (out of 2); **Leandro**; 14.60% (out of 3); **Yisela**; 6.40% (out of 4); **Luana**; 2.80% (out of 5); **Alejandra**; 1.60% (out of 6); **Andrea**; **Cinzia**; **Solange**; Most votes to save (out of 9)	**Solange**; 48.60% (out of 2); **Cinzia**; 1.20% (out of 3); **Steffany**; 0.40% (out of 4); **Manuel**; 0.30% (out of 5); **Emanuel**; **Tamara**; Fewest votes (out of 7)	**Steffany**; 44.20% (out of 2); **Yisela**; 17% (out of 3); **Matías**; 2.50% (out of 4); **Emanuel**; 0.90% (out of 5); **Andrea**; **Charlotte**; **Cinzia**; **Manuel**; Most votes to save (out of 9)	**Luana**; 39.90% (out of 2); **Alejandra**; 8.80% (out of 3); **Juan Carlos**; 5.30% (out of 4); **Mariela**; 3.40% (out of 5); **Sebastián**; 2.40% (out of 6); **Matías**; 1.60% (out of 7); **Andrea**; **Charlotte**; **Cinzia**; **Emanuel**; **Jennifer**; **Juan**; **Manuel**; **Steffany**; **Tamara**; **Solange**; **Yanina**; **Yisela**; Most votes to save (out of 19)	**Luana**; 48.80% (out of 2); **Solange**; 19.90% (out of 3); **Yisela**; 0.80% (out of 4); **Emanuel**; 0.40% (out of 5); **Juan Carlos**; 0.10% (out of 6); **Alejandra**; **Mariela**; **Matías**; Fewest votes (out of 9)	**Alejandra**; **Mariela**; **Matías**; **Sebastián**; Most votes (out of 5); **Charlotte**; **Cinzia**; **Emanuel**; **Jennifer**; **Juan**; **Luana**; **Solange**; **Steffany**; **Tamara**; **Yanina**; **Yisela**; Most votes (out of 16)	**Solange**; 44.70% (out of 2); **Yisela**; 1.30% (out of 3); **Yanina**; 0.70% (out of 4); **Sebastián**; 0.50% (out of 5); **Matías**; 0.20% (out of 6)	**Alejandra**; 22.80% (out of 2); **Mariela**; 7.30% (out of 3); **Matías**; 2.30% (out of 4); **Tamara**; 2% (out of 5); **Jennifer**; **Juan**; Most votes to save (out of 7)	**Solange**; 46.70% (out of 2); **Alejandra**; 0.90% (out of 3); **Matías**; 0.50% (out of 4); **Juan**; 0.30% (out of 5); **Luana**; 0.10% (out of 6); **Mariela**; **Yanina**; Fewest votes (out of 8)	**Solange**; 42% (out of 2); **Jennifer**; 4.50% (out of 3); **Charlotte**; 1.90% (out of 4); **Yanina**; 0.50% (out of 5); **Alejandra**; 0.20% (out of 6)	**Luana**; 42.90% (out of 2); **Yanina**; 11.50% (out of 3); **Tamara**; 1.20% (out of 4); **Charlotte**; 0.80% (out of 5); **Solange**; **Yisela**; Most votes to save (out of 7)	**Solange**; 48.90% (out of 2); **Yisela**; 1.30% (out of 3); **Jennifer**; 0.70% (out of 4); **Mariela**; 0.30% (out of 5); **Luana**; 0.10% (out of 6)	**Yisela**; 41.90% (out of 2); **Mariela**; 0.60% (out of 3); **Charlotte**; 0.10% (out of 4)	**Charlotte**; **Luana**; **Solange**; **Yanina**; **Yisela**; Most votes (out of 6)	**Charlotte**; **Luana**; **Solange**; **Yisela**; Most votes (out of 5)	**Charlotte**; **Solange**; **Yisela**; Most votes (out of 4)	**Solange**; **Yisela**; Most votes (out of 3)	**Solange**; 51.80% to win (out of 2)	

=== Notes ===
- **^1**: This week, there was no Head of Household competition.
- **^2**: This week, the seven or more HouseGuests with the most points would face the public vote, with the first half of the vote being vote to save, while the second half of the vote being vote to evict.
- **^3**: Daniela temporarily left the house on Day 3 due to the death of her father. Before she left, she was eligible to nominate. She nominated Carmiña and Manuel. She then returned to the house on Day 7.
- **^4**: Divina temporarily left the house on Day 3 due to health reasons. Before she left, she was eligible to nominate. She nominated Carmiña and Solange. It was later announced on Day 5 she would not return based on medical recommendations.
- **^5**: As a new HouseGuest, Carla was ineligible to nominate, but is eligible to be nominated.
- **^6**: As she returned to the house following the death of her father, Daniela was ineligible to nominate, however is eligible for eviction this week.
- **^7**: As the first Head of Household, Franco P. won the power to nominate one HouseGuest for eviction without the possibility of being saved. He also won the right to banned one HouseGuest from nominating this week. He chose Juan to face eviction and chose Eduardo to be banned from nominating.
- **^8**: This week, the public were voting to save rather than evict.
- **^9**: Following Tomás eviction, it was announced there will be no nominations. Instead all HouseGuest except Lola T. (who won the HoH competition) face the public vote. The HouseGuest with the fewest votes to save would be evicted on Thursday, while the HouseGuest with the second fewest votes to save will be evicted on Monday.
- **^10**: After making racist remarks behind Jenny's back, Carmiña was ejected by Gran Hermano.
- **^11**: As a new HouseGuest, Jessica was ineligible to nominate, but was eligible to be nominated.
- **^12**: As there was no nominations in Week 3, Tomás gave his Power Vote to Daniela for Week 4.
- **^13**: As the new Head of Household, Manuel won the power to nominate one HouseGuest for eviction without the possibility of being saved. He chose Cinzia. He also chose 11 HouseGuests to ban from nominating this week. He chose Catalina, Cinzia, Daniela, Danelik, Eduardo, Emanuel, Jennifer, Juan, Luana, Solange and Yisela. As a result, Cinzia special nomination vote was voided and Daniela's power vote from Carla was also voided.
- **^14**: As Lola P. use the special nomination vote, the power vote that Tomás originally gave her was voided.
- **^15**: As multiple HouseGuests discussed nominations, Gran Hermano voided all nominations and put all HouseGuests including Head of Household Manuel up for eviction.
- **^16**: Andrea temporarily left the house on Day 25 due to health reasons. She returned on Day 29.
- **^17**: As the new Head of Household, Martín won the power to nominate three HouseGuests for eviction without the possibility of being saved. In addition, those three will be also banned from nominating this week. He chose Jennifer, Juan, and Lola T. .
- **^18**: As she returned to the house following an medical evacuation, Andrea was ineligible to nominate, however is eligible for eviction this week.
- **^19**: Jenny decided to walk from the game. As a result of this, Cinzia vote towards Jenny was voided.
- **^20**: As a new HouseGuest, Tamara was ineligible to nominate, but was eligible to be nominated.
- **^21**: As the new Head of Household, Martín won the power to nominate two HouseGuests for eviction without the possibility of being saved. In addition, those two will be also banned from nominating. He chose Andrea and Jessica. He also won the right to give one HouseGuest immunity from the next eviction. He chose Brian.
- **^22**: As punishment for discussing nominations, Franco Z., Luana, and Martín votes were voided.
- **^23**: As punishment for arguing with Tamara in which she later faked an injury and tried to blame it on her, Jennifer was automatically nominated for eviction without the possibility of being saved. Furthermore, she was banned from competing in the next Head of Household competition and is also banned from nominating this week.
- **^24**: Following a slip and fall she suffered on Day 43, it was announced the following day that Andrea would not return to the house based on medical recommendations.
- **^25**: As punishment for discussing the possible superpowers he might get, Nazareno was stripped of his HoH power and was no longer safe. Despite being the runner-up, Catalina was involved in the conversation with Nazareno and therefore was not crowned the new HoH. As Martín was the outgoing Head of Household, he took over as the new HoH, however he was not immune from eviction as the new Head of Household.
- **^26**: As the new Head of Household, Martín won the power to give two HouseGuests the power to nominate one HouseGuest for eviction who will also be banned from nominating as well as banning five HouseGuests from nominating this week. Those individuals were Brian and Emanuel. They both nominated Catalina for eviction. The HouseGuests they banned from nominating were Daniela, Lola P., Manuel, Nazareno and Yisela.
- **^27**: Solange was originally nominated for eviction in Week 7. However, as she will be taking part in the Housemate Exchange with La casa de los famosos USA, Solange will automatically be nominated for eviction in Week 9. She will also be exempt from nominations in Week 8.
- **^28**: As a new HouseGuest, Grecia was ineligible to nominate, but was eligible to be nominated.
- **^29**: As the new Head of Household, Juan won the power to nominate two HouseGuests for eviction without the possibility of being saved. In addition, those two will be also banned from nominating. He chose Franco Z. and Martín.
- **^30**: As a temporary HouseGuest, Fabio participated in this week's nominations.
- **^31**: On Day 52, Juan won a special challenge and had his votes upgraded. He nominated with three and two points instead of the usual two and one points.
- **^32**: This week, the public vote was mixed. With the first half of the vote being vote to save, while the second half of the vote being vote to evict.
- **^33**: Despite being safe, Jessica decided to leave the house. However, the eviction went on as planned.
- **^34**: As punishment for discussing the possible superpowers she might get, Luana was stripped of her HoH power and was no longer safe. As Manuel was the runner-up, he became the new Head of Household, however he was not safe from eviction as he loss the HoH competition.
- **^35**: As the new Head of Household, Manuel won the power to give two HouseGuests immunity. These two HouseGuests will also not nominate this week. He chose Emanuel and Nazareno. He also won the power to nominate one HouseGuest for eviction without the possibility of being saved. In addition, that HouseGuest will be banned from nominating this week. He chose Tamara.
- **^36**: As punishment for confessing that he power nominated Jennifer, Brian's power nomination of Jennifer was voided and was not eligible to nominate again this week.
- **^37**: As a new HouseGuest, Gladys was ineligible to nominate, but was eligible to be nominated.
- **^38**: As the new Head of Household, Tamara won the power to give one HouseGuests the power to nominate two HouseGuest for eviction. Those two Houseguests will be banned from nominating this week. Furthermore, she and the nominator will not make any further nominations this week. She chose Manuel who nominated Emanuel and Luana for eviction.
- **^39**: As she repeatedly expressing her intention to leave the house and express dissatisfaction with other HouseGuests, Solange was removed from the house. As a result of this, Gran Hermano enabled the golden ticket and chose Cinzia to take Solange place.
- **^40**: As she returned to the House via golden ticket, Cinzia was ineligible to nominate, but was eligible to be nominated.
- **^41**: This week, the eight or more HouseGuests with the most points face eviction. As a result, with only seven HouseGuests receiving points, all HouseGuests, except the Head of Household Tamara face the public vote.
- **^42**: As the new Head of Household, Catalina won the right to ban two HouseGuests from nominating this week. She chose Cinzia and Emanuel. She also chose two HouseGuests to have the power to nominate three HouseGuests instead of two. She chose Manuel and Lola P. .
- **^43**: Before Nominations, Yisela decided to leave the house due to family reasons. She therefore did not vote.
- **^44**: As a result of Catalina being the Head of Household and Yisela leaving the house before nominations, Franco Z. votes were voided.
- **^45**: This week the Nominations Block was hidden. Nominations took place as normal, but the HouseGuests will not know who is nominated until they are saved.
- **^46**: Following Daniela's eviction, it was announced there would be no nominations. All HouseGuests would face the public vote. The two HouseGuests with the most votes will be evicted immediately before the Nominations Gala.
- **^47**: As punishment for sharing information from the outside world, Cinzia was automatically nominated for eviction. Because of this, only one HouseGuest was saved before the mixed vote switched to Vote to Evict.
- **^48**: Following Danelik's eviction, the public had to vote for their favorite ex-HouseGuest to re-enter the house. The two HouseGuests who receive the most votes would re-enter the house. Andrea, Daniela, Divina, Gabriel and Solange all declined to take part in the repechage.
- **^49**: After the repechage, Gran Hermano gave a series of golden tickets to selected HouseGuests. Brian received one of them. Andrea received a golden ticket and re-enter the house after being medically evacuated on Day 43. An extra Golden Ticket was given to Carmiña, however her re-entry was voided by Jenny as Carmiña made racial comments about Jenny while still in the house at the time.
- **^50**: HouseGuests that enter or re-enter the House were not eligible to nominate, however they were eligible to be nominated.
- **^51**: As punishment for sharing information from the outside world, Andrea, Brian, Lola T., and Yisela were all automatically nominated for eviction. However, during the eviction gala, Lola T. was removed as she kept sharing information from the outside world. Furthermore, as Manuel kept receiving outside information from Lola T., he was automatically nominated for eviction.
- **^52**: As the new head of household, Emanuel won the power to ban one HouseGuest from nominating and taking part in the car challenge this week. He chose Manuel.
- **^53**: On Day 98, Gladys decided to leave the house. As result of this she was removed the list of nominees. The eviction on Day 99 went on as planned.
- **^54**: During Week 14 following Lola T.'s removal from the house, Gran Hermano re-enabled the golden ticket. On Day 98, Solange was chosen to re-entered the house.
- **^55**: As punishment for speaking without a microphone, Matías was automatically nominated for eviction. Furthermore, he was banned from competing in the next Head of Household competition.
- **^56**: On Day 100, boxes were scattered across the backyard. Some boxes contained green and red cards. HouseGuests who received red cards were banned from nominating this week. Those HouseGuests that received red cards were Cinzia, Jennifer, Luana, Matías, Steffany, and Yanina.
- **^57**: As a new HouseGuest, Alejandra was not eligible to nominate, however she was eligible to be nominated.
- **^58**: As a returning HouseGuest, Solange was not eligible to nominate, however she was eligible to be nominated.
- **^59**: As the new head of household, Catalina won the power to save one nominee from eviction and nominate another HouseGuest in their place. She chose to save Tamara and nominate Andrea for eviction.
- **^60**: As the new Head of Household, Sebastián won the power nominate two additional HouseGuests for eviction. He chose Alejandra and Andrea. He was also given a red and yellow card. He had to give one HouseGuest a red card which will void the two point vote, while giving another HouseGuest a yellow card which will void the one point vote. He gave the red card to Leandro and gave the yellow card to Yisela.
- **^61**: This week, the eight or more HouseGuests with the most points will face the public vote.
- **^62**: As the new Head of Household, Matías won the power to banned four HouseGuests from voting this week. He chose Alejandra, Juan Carlos, Leandro, and Mariela. He also won the power to save one of the nominees. He chose Nerea.
- **^63**: As the new Head of Household, Juan Carlos won the power to nominate one additional HouseGuest for eviction. He chose Charlotte.
- **^64**: As punishment for discussing the outside world, Andrea was automatically nominated for eviction. Furthermore, she was banned from nominating this week.
- **^65**: Emanuel answered the golden phone and was automatically nominated for eviction. Furthermore, he was banned from nominating this week. He also was asked to choose one HouseGuest. Unaware that the HouseGuest he chooses, will receive immunity from eviction this week. He chose Solange.
- **^66**: Following Nerea eviction, it was announced there will be no nominations. Instead all HouseGuest will face the public vote. The first half of the vote will be vote to save. The HouseGuests that receive the fewest votes to save will be on the plants nominations block where the second half of the vote will be vote to evict.
- **^67**: As there was no nominations in Week 19, Nerea voided Solange's votes for Week 20.
- **^68**: As the new Head of Household, Juan won the power to ban one HouseGuest from nominating this week. Furthermore, this HouseGuest will not compete in the next Head of Household competition if they survive eviction. He chose Solange. As result of this Nerea's voided vote towards Solange was voided.
- **^69**: Despite being banned from nominating this week, Solange had to instantly nominate one HouseGuest for eviction. She chose Emanuel.
- **^70**: As punishment for moving during The Freeze, Cinzia was banned from nominating. Furthermore, she was banned from competing in the next Head of Household competition.
- **^71**: Due to a family emergency, Andrea decided to leave the house.
- **^72**: Following Manuel's eviction, it was announced there would be no nominations. All HouseGuests would face the public vote. The HouseGuest who receives fewest votes to save will be evicted immediately before the Nominations Gala.
- **^73**: As the new Head of Household, Steffany won the power to banned four HouseGuests from voting this week. She chose Alejandra, Matías, Tamara, and Yisela.
- **^74**: As temporary HouseGuests, Ariel, Daniela C., Emmanuel, Fabio, Juan Pablo, Juliana, Romina, and Selva participated in this week's nominations.
- **^75**: This week, the seven or more HouseGuests with the most points will face the public vote.
- **^76**: As temporary HouseGuests, Ariel, Emmanuel, Juan Pablo, Juliana, and Selva participated in this week's nominations.
- **^77**: Yanina answered the gold phone and was banned from nominating this week. She also had to pick one person (HouseGuest or visitor). Unaware that they will also be banned from nominating this week. She chose Selva.
- **^78**: As the new Head of Household, Jennifer won the right to view three of her fellow HouseGuests nominations. She chose Luana, Matías, and Steffany.
- **^79**: As punishment for discussing nominations and announcing his intention to use the Special Nomination Power, Matías votes towards Steffany and Yisela were voided.
- **^80**: As punishment for discussing nominations, Cinzia vote towards Steffany was voided.
- **^81**: Despite discussing nominations with Cinzia, Solange votes were still voided by Sebastián.
- **^82**: As punishment for discussing nominations, Steffany vote towards Solange was voided.
- **^83**: Following an severe fall in the bedroom, Cinzia was evacuated from the house. It was then revealed that she suffered a broken vertebrae and therefore could not continue in the game.
- **^84**: As the new Head of Household, Yisela won the right to view three of their fellow HouseGuests nominations. They chose Matías, Solange, and Yanina.
- **^85**: The HouseGuests had to choose one visitor not to take part in nominations, unaware that this visitor will leave the house last and power nominate one HouseGuests who is not up for eviction. They chose Selva, who then power nominated Yanina for eviction.
- **^86**: This week, the five or more HouseGuests with the most points will face the public vote.
- **^87**: Due to a family emergency involving his mom, Juan decided to leave the house. As a result the voting was closed. Had he not left he would have had the most votes to evict with 52.60%. However, the eviction for this week went on as planned with the vote being reopened with Yanina joining the list of nominees after Selva power nominated her.
- **^88**: As the new Head of Household, Yisela won the power to nominate one HouseGuest for eviction. She chose Solange. She also won the right to nominate with three and two points instead of two and one points.
- **^89**: This week the remaining nine HouseGuests each had to choose one ex-houseguest to be their partner. The last ex-houseguest standing will win a prize. The pairings were:
  - Alejandra and Jenny
  - Charlotte and Sebastián
  - Jennifer and Brian
  - Luana and Danelik
  - Mariela and Steffany
  - Solange and Tomás
  - Tamara and Nazareno
  - Yanina and Martín
  - Yisela and Catalina
- **^90**: During this week's nominations, the current HouseGuests only voted for two points, while the Ex-HouseGuests only voted for one point. Evicted HouseGuest Matías gave Luana two extra points to nominate giving her a total of four points instead of two. As Yanina also used the special nominations power, both of her votes were counted.
- **^91**: As the new Head of Household, Luana had her vote count as doubled this week.
- **^92**: During this week's nominations, the current HouseGuests only voted for two points, while the Ex-HouseGuests only voted for one point.
- **^93**: As the new Head of Household, Jennifer was given an additional one point to nominate this week.
- **^94**: This week, the four HouseGuests with the most points face the public vote. If there were four or more HouseGuests nominated, current Head of Household Jennifer has the power to save as many nominees (with the exception of herself if she was nominated) until there were four remaining. As there was more than four, Jennifer chose to save Solange and Luana from eviction.
- **^95**: For the final weeks, the public was voting for the winner of Gran Hermano.

== Production ==
=== Development ===
Gran Hermano is co-produced by production companies Kuarzo Entertainment Argentina and Banijay. The season was first confirmed on 22 June 2025. Host Santiago del Moro was confirmed to return for his fourth consecutive season. Casting for the season started on the same day of the announcement with open-call auditions held for people from up 18 years old. Applicants had to upload a presentation video and show their social networks. This season is the second to feature celebrities since Gran Hermano Famosos in 2007, and also features new and former HouseGuests.

=== Production design ===
Views (from top to bottom, left to right) from the Diary Room, kitchen and dining room, girls' bedroom, boys' bedroom, living and courtyard of the house.

The house, located in Martínez, Buenos Aires, is the same as the previous three seasons. The house is also outfitted with 65 cameras, 87 microphones, and is over 2,500 square metres, including 1,200 m^{2} indoors, 400 m^{2} outdoors, a supermarket, and the "arena" in which the HouseGuests are expected to compete for games and challenges. For this season, a beach zone was added for the pool and an indoor pool was built where the gym was previously located.

=== Prizes ===
The winner of the series, determined by the audience, received AR$ 70 million pesos (invested by Mercado Pago). The runner-up received AR$ 20 million pesos, and the second runner-up received AR$ 10 million pesos. The HouseGuests who finished in the final two, each won a house from Roca Viviendas.

== Release ==
=== Broadcast ===
The premiere of the thirteenth season of Gran Hermano was broadcast on Telefe on 23 February 2026. The telecast (split into two parts) received an average of 15.7/77.5 household rating/share. Throughout its broadcast, in same-day viewership, the season averaged a 11.4 HH rating.

The season airs from Sundays through Thursdays on Telefe, with nomination galas on Wednesdays, eviction galas on Mondays, debates on Sundays, Tuesdays and Thursdays, and a special edition called Night with the Exes (La Noche de los Ex in Spanish) hosted by Roberto Funes Ugarte, with former HouseGuests from previous seasons on Saturdays. The debates are joined by panelists Laura Ubfal, Ceferino Reato, Sol Pérez, Gastón Trezeguet, Eliana Guercio, Tomás Balmaceda, Gustavo Conti, Ana Laura Romano, Mariana Brey, Santiago Algorta and Eugenia Ruíz.

Internationally, the season aired in simulcast in Uruguay on Canal 10.

=== Streaming services ===
DirecTV's video streaming service DGO was chosen to offer a 24-hour live feed of the house. Telefe also airs in simulcast the season via YouTube and Twitch under the Telefe Streams channel. Three new streaming shows will air during the season: The Summit (La Cumbre in Spanish), that features an interview between host Del Moro and the last evicted HouseGuest, The Play (La Jugada in Spanish), hosted by Federico Popgold and Daniela Celis, GH React with Lucila Villar y Federico Bongiorno, and Streamers League (Liga de Streamers in Spanish) with some content creators reacting to Gran Hermano.
