= La casa de los famosos season 6 =

Reality show aired during 2026

La casa de los famosos
- Season 6
- Hosted by: Jimena Gallego; Javier Poza
- No. of days: 115
- No. of houseguests: 26
- Winner: Fabio Agostini
- Runner-up: Celinee Santos
- No. of episodes: 98

Release
- Original network: Telemundo
- Original release: February 17 – June 11, 2026

Season chronology
- ← Previous; Season 5

The sixth season of the American Spanish-language reality television series La casa de los famosos premiered on February 17, 2026, with a live move-in on Telemundo. The show follows a group of celebrities as they compete to be the last competitor remaining to win the grand prize of $200,000.

The season was announced on May 8, 2025. Jimena Gallego and Javier Poza returned as co-host of the series. This season, Cristina Porta, Manelyk González, René Franco and Yina Calderón serve as panelists.

The season concluded on June 11, 2026, after 115 days of competition with Fabio Agostini being crowned the winner, and Celinee Santos the runner-up.

== Format ==
The season follows a group of celebrities living together in a house with no communication with the outside world as they are constantly filmed during their stay in the house. Each week, the housemates must complete assigned tasks to earn their food allowance for the week. At the start of the week, they housemates in the Head of Household competition, with the winner being immune from eviction. Later in the week, During their time in the house, the housemates are required to nominate two of their fellow contestants for potential elimination, and the five with the most votes are nominated. One of the nominated housemates can be saved by the winner of the Power to Save competition. The public votes for the housemate they want to keep in the house and the one with the fewest votes is evicted.

=== Nominations ===
This season, the Head of Household is allowed to automatically nominate a housemate of their choice.

==== The Exile ====
During the first eight weeks of the season, the winner of the Power to Save competition exiled two of the least voted housemates in the nominations for 48 hours. The exiled housemates live in a cabin outside the main house with minimal amenities and are not eligible to compete in the Head of Household competition. Additionally, the exiled housemates earn a reward that may give them an advantage in the game.

| Week | Power to Save Holder | Exiled | Reward |
|---|---|---|---|
| 1 (Day 1–3) | None (Note: On Day 1, Lupita answered the purple phone and exiled Yoridan, while Fabio was exiled after being left without a bedroom.) | Fabio; Yoridan | An extra point to use in their nominations. |
| 1 (Day 6–8) | Horacio | Caeli; Laura G. | An additional housemate (Luis) enters the house. |
| 2 | Yoridan | Divo; Josh | An additional nominee for eviction. |
| 3 | Stefano | Curvy; Kenny | None |
| 4 | Divo | Curvy; Josh | An additional player (Josh) in the final round of the Power to Save competition. |
| 5 | Kenzo | Divo; Laura G. | Remove three penalty nomination points from the housemate of their choice. |
| 6 | Kenny | Horacio; Luis | A bonus piggy bank for nominations. |
| 8 | None (Note: On Day 50, a competition was held between the housemates yet to be exiled (Celinee, Kenzo, Laura Z. and Stefano). Laura Z. won and avoided the final exile.) | Celinee; Kenzo; Stefano | Spin a roulette wheel to determine the number of additional nominees for eviction. |

== Housemates ==
The first three housemates were announced on January 26, 2026. Three more housemates were announced on February 4, 2026. The rest of the housemates were revealed during the move-in premiere. Yina Calderón was originally announced as a housemate, but during the premiere episode she confirmed that she would be part of the panelists. Luis Coronel entered as an additional housemate on Day 8. Jeni de la Vega, Lorena Herrera, Sandra Itzel and Verónica del Castillo entered as additional housemates on Day 71.

| Name | Age | Notability | Day entered | Status | Ref |
|---|---|---|---|---|---|
| Fabio Agostini | 35 | Influencer | 1 | Winner; Day 115 | |
| Celinee Santos | 26 | Model | 1 | Runner-up; Day 115 | |
| Luis Coronel | 30 | Singer | 8 | 3rd Place; Day 115 | |
| Josh Martinez (Note: Josh Martinez previously participated on the nineteenth season of Big Brother USA.) | 32 | Reality TV star | 1 | 4th Place; Day 115 | |
| Yoridan Martínez | 30 | Athlete | 1 | 5th Place; Day 115 | |
| Stefano Piccioni | 33 | Fitness model | 1 | 6th Place; Day 114 | |
| Horacio Pancheri | 43 | Actor | 1 | 7th Place; Day 113 | |
| Zelma "Curvy" Cherem | 34 | TV personality | 1 | 8th Place; Day 112 | |
| Kenny Rodriguez | 25 | Reality TV star | 1 | Evicted; Day 111 | |
| Verónica del Castillo | 56 | Journalist | 71 | Evicted; Day 109 | |
| Caeli Santaolalla | 36 | Influencer | 1 | Evicted; Day 105 | |
| Sandra Itzel | 32 | Actress and Singer | 71 | Evicted; Day 98 | |
| Jeni de la Vega | 32 | Influencer | 71 | Evicted; Day 91 | |
| Lorena Herrera (Note: Lorena Herrera previously participated on the first season of Big Brother VIP México.) | 59 | Actress and singer | 71 | Evicted; Day 84 | |
| Eduardo Antonio "El Divo" | 56 | Singer and actor | 1 | Evicted; Day 77 | |
| Kenzo Nudo | 29 | Reality TV star | 1 | Evicted; Day 70 | |
| Laura González (Note: Laura González previously participated on the second season of La casa de los famosos Colombia.) | 30 | Model and businesswoman | 1 | Evicted; Day 63 | |
| Laura Zapata | 69 | Actress | 1 | Evicted; Day 56 | |
| Julia Argüelles | 29 | Actress | 1 | Evicted; Day 49 | |
| Jailyne Ojeda | 28 | Influencer | 1 | Evicted; Day 42 | |
| Oriana Marzoli (Note: Oriana Marzoli previously participated on the sixth and eighth season of Gran Hermano VIP, and the seventh season of Grande Fratello VIP.) | 33 | Reality TV star | 1 | Evicted; Day 37 | |
| Guillermo Kunno | 25 | Influencer | 1 | Evicted; Day 35 | |
| Vanessa Arias | 43 | TV personality | 1 | Evicted; Day 28 | |
| Sergio Mayer (Note: Sergio Mayer previously participated on the third season of Big Brother VIP México and the first season of La casa de los famosos México.) | 59 | Actor and politician | 1 | Evicted; Day 21 | |
| Lupita Jones | 58 | Businesswoman & Miss Universe 1991 | 1 | Evicted; Day 14 | |
| Zoe Bayona | 27 | Influencer | 1 | Evicted; Day 7 | |

=== Housemate exchange ===
On April 8, 2026, a housemate exchange with Gran Hermano Argentina was announced. Fabio was swapped with Solange "Sol" Abraham from Gran Hermano 13 during week 9, returning to the house on Day 64.

== Nominations table ==
Every week, each housemate nominates for three, two and one points, shown in descending order in the table. The five housemates with the most points face the public vote.

This housemate was the Head of Household, and could not be nominated.
This housemate was immune from eviction.
This housemate was automatically put up for eviction.
Positive Nomination

| | Week 1 | Week 2 | Week 3 | Week 4 | Week 5 | Week 6 | | Week 7 | Week 8 | Week 9 | Week 10 | Week 11 | Week 12 | Week 13 | Week 14 | Week 15 | Week 16 | | Week 17 | | | | | |
| | Week 1 | Week 2 | Week 3 | Week 4 | Week 5 | Day 37 | Day 42 | Week 7 | Week 8 | Week 9 | Week 10 | Week 11 | Week 12 | Week 13 | Week 14 | Week 15 | Day 109 | Day 111 | Day 112 | Day 113 | Day 114 | Finale | | |
|---|---|---|---|---|---|---|---|---|---|---|---|---|---|---|---|---|---|---|---|---|---|---|---|---|
| Fabio | Divo; Lupita; Josh | ~~Lupita~~; ~~Horacio~~; ~~Julia~~ | Celinee; Caeli; Kenzo | ~~Celinee~~; ~~Oriana~~; ~~Caeli~~ | Caeli; Curvy | Nominated | Caeli; Curvy; Josh | ~~Celinee~~; ~~Luis~~; ~~Horacio~~; Caeli; Kenzo; Curvy | Kenzo; Caeli | Exempt | Caeli; Kenny | Celinee; Luis | Horacio; Verónica; Lorena | Verónica; Kenny; Curvy | Verónica; Stefano | Luis; Curvy; Verónica | Stefano; Yoridan | | No nominations | | | Winner (Day 115) | | |
| Celinee | Oriana; Julia; Kenzo | Kunno; Laura G. Fabio; Stefano | Jailyne; Caeli; Kenzo | ~~Stefano~~; ~~Fabio~~; ~~Oriana~~ | Fabio; Kunno | Nominated | Divo; Laura G. Jailyne | Laura G. Julia; Divo; Fabio | Yoridan; Fabio | Divo; Yoridan | Yoridan; Stefano | Yoridan; Stefano | Jeni; Caeli; Sandra | Josh; Stefano; Caeli; Jeni | Caeli; Sandra | Yoridan; Caeli | Josh; Curvy | | No nominations | | | Runner-up (Day 115) | | |
| Luis | Not in House | Exempt | Fabio; Oriana; Sergio | ~~Fabio~~; ~~Oriana~~; ~~Julia~~ | Julia; Fabio; Stefano | No nominations | Stefano; Julia; Divo | Julia; Fabio; Divo | Yoridan; Stefano | Laura G. Yoridan | Stefano; Yoridan | Stefano; Divo | Stefano; Fabio; Caeli | Caeli; Yoridan; Fabio | Fabio; Caeli | Josh; Yoridan; Caeli | Horacio; Josh | | No nominations | | | Third place (Day 115) | | |
| Josh | Sergio; Vanessa; Fabio | Fabio; Laura G. Vanessa | Julia; Fabio; Kunno | ~~Kunno~~; ~~Stefano~~; ~~Fabio~~ | Fabio; Kunno | Nominated | Stefano; Divo; Jailyne | Divo; Fabio; Laura G. | Stefano; Fabio | Divo; Laura G. | Stefano; Yoridan | Fabio; Stefano; Yoridan | Stefano; Fabio; Caeli | Caeli; Fabio; Yoridan | Yoridan; Sandra; Fabio; Stefano | Stefano; Yoridan | Celinee; Curvy | | No nominations | | | Fourth place (Day 115) | | |
| Yoridan | Lupita; Divo; Julia | Laura G. Kenzo; Julia | Sergio; Julia; Kenzo | ~~Kenny~~; ~~Kenzo~~; ~~Jailyne~~ | Julia; Josh; Jailyne | No nominations | Julia; Jailyne; Kenzo | Julia; Kenzo; Caeli | Caeli; Kenzo | Divo; Josh | Celinee; Josh | Curvy; Luis | Celinee; Verónica; Lorena; Horacio | Horacio; Curvy; Verónica | Caeli; Luis; Kenny; Verónica | Horacio; Kenny | Stefano; Fabio | | No nominations | | | Fifth place (Day 115) | | |
| Stefano | Celinee; Yoridan; Sergio | ~~Julia~~; ~~Lupita~~; ~~Horacio~~ | Josh; Celinee; Caeli; Jailyne | ~~Kenzo~~; ~~Celinee~~; ~~Curvy~~ | Horacio; Curvy | No nominations | Caeli; Curvy; Laura Z. | Celinee; Horacio; Luis; Fabio | Caeli; Kenzo | Yoridan; Kenny | Fabio; Kenzo; Josh | Celinee; Luis | Horacio; Lorena; Verónica | Curvy; Josh; Verónica | Sandra; Horacio; Verónica | Celinee; Kenny | Fabio; Yoridan | | No nominations | | | Sixth place (Day 114) | | |
| Horacio | Sergio; Oriana; Zoe | Fabio; Laura G. Yoridan | Jailyne; Julia; Luis | ~~Fabio~~; ~~Oriana~~; ~~Kunno~~ | Fabio; Julia; Stefano | No nominations | Stefano; Divo; Laura G. | Fabio; Julia; Laura G. | Fabio; Divo | Stefano; Divo; Laura G. | Stefano; Kenzo | Kenny; Divo; Luis | Stefano; Fabio; Caeli | Caeli; Stefano; Fabio | Curvy; Stefano | Yoridan; Stefano | Curvy; Celinee | | No nominations | | Seventh place (Day 113) | | | |
| Curvy | Oriana; Kunno; Kenzo | ~~Stefano~~; ~~Fabio~~; ~~Laura G.~~ | Kunno; Jailyne; Luis | ~~Oriana~~; ~~Fabio~~; ~~Jailyne~~ | Fabio; Julia | Nominated | Jailyne; Divo; Laura G. | Laura G. Julia; Fabio | Divo; Yoridan | Divo; Laura G. | Yoridan; Stefano | Yoridan; Caeli | Horacio; Caeli; Sandra; Stefano | Kenny; Jeni; Caeli | Luis; Sandra | Caeli; Verónica | Celinee; Horacio | | No nominations | Eighth place (Day 112) | | | | |
| Kenny | Divo; Zoe; Horacio | ~~Lupita~~; ~~Horacio~~; ~~Julia~~ | Laura G. Julia; Vanessa | ~~Curvy~~; ~~Yoridan~~; ~~Luis~~ | Fabio; Julia; Jailyne | No nominations | Fabio; Stefano; Julia; Yoridan | Stefano; ~~Divo~~; ~~Fabio~~; ~~Julia~~; Laura G. Yoridan; Laura Z. | Yoridan; Fabio | Laura G. Yoridan | Fabio; Yoridan | Yoridan; Stefano | Fabio; Stefano; Caeli | Fabio; Stefano; Yoridan | Verónica; Stefano | Yoridan; Caeli | Verónica; Curvy | | Evicted (Day 111) | | | | | |
| Verónica | Not in House | | | | | | | | | | | Exempt | Caeli; Sandra; Jeni | Jeni; Stefano; Caeli | Fabio; Stefano | Caeli; Stefano | Curvy; Horacio | Evicted (Day 109) | | | | | | |
| Caeli | Vanessa; Celinee; Zoe | Kenny; Fabio; Stefano | Fabio; Celinee; Luis | ~~Stefano~~; ~~Kunno~~; ~~Oriana~~ | Julia; Kunno | Nominated | Jailyne; Stefano; Divo | Laura G. Julia; Divo | Divo; Stefano | Laura G. Yoridan | Yoridan; Stefano | Celinee; Kenny | Lorena; Verónica; Horacio | Luis; Curvy; Kenny | Curvy | Curvy; Verónica | Evicted (Day 105) | | | | | | | |
| Sandra | Not in House | | | | | | | | | | | Exempt | Verónica; Lorena; Horacio | Celinee; Verónica; Curvy; Kenny | Verónica; Celinee; Curvy | Evicted (Day 98) | | | | | | | | |
| Jeni | Not in House | | | | | | | | | | | Exempt | Lorena; Verónica; Horacio | Fabio; Verónica; Kenny | Evicted (Day 91) | | | | | | | | | |
| Lorena | Not in House | | | | | | | | | | | Exempt | Jeni; Caeli; Stefano | Evicted (Day 84) | | | | | | | | | | |
| Divo | Fabio; Oriana; Kunno | Stefano; Kenzo; Yoridan | Sergio; Horacio; Celinee | ~~Horacio~~; ~~Kenzo~~; ~~Caeli~~; ~~Luis~~ | Laura Z. Curvy; Horacio | No nominations | Laura Z. Caeli; Curvy | ~~Celinee~~; ~~Horacio~~; ~~Luis~~ | Luis; Kenzo | Laura G. Celinee | Horacio; Luis; Kenny | Curvy; Luis | Evicted (Day 77) | | | | | | | | | | | |
| Kenzo | Celinee; Sergio; Stefano | ~~Julia~~; ~~Horacio~~; ~~Lupita~~ | Laura G. Fabio; Celinee | ~~Julia~~; ~~Stefano~~; ~~Kunno~~ | Oriana; Fabio; Julia; Kunno | No nominations | Stefano; Julia; Laura G. | ~~Divo~~; Yoridan; Laura G. Fabio; Julia; Celinee | Fabio; Yoridan | Yoridan; Divo | Stefano; Yoridan | Evicted (Day 70) | | | | | | | | | | | | |
| Laura G. | Celinee; Vanessa; Horacio | ~~Horacio~~; ~~Lupita~~; ~~Julia~~ | Kenzo; Celinee; Laura Z. | ~~Caeli~~; ~~Celinee~~; ~~Oriana~~ | Caeli; Horacio | No nominations | Curvy; Caeli; Laura Z. | Celinee; Luis; Horacio | Kenny; Kenzo; Caeli | Divo; Caeli | Evicted (Day 63) | | | | | | | | | | | | | |
| Laura Z. | Oriana; Zoe; Kunno | ~~Fabio~~; ~~Stefano~~; ~~Laura G.~~ | Laura G. Julia; Sergio | ~~Stefano~~; ~~Laura G.~~; ~~Kunno~~ | Fabio; Kunno | Nominated | Divo; Laura G. Stefano | Laura G. Divo; Julia; Fabio | Yoridan; Fabio | Evicted (Day 56) | | | | | | | | | | | | | | |
| Julia | Zoe; Oriana; Sergio | Fabio; Kenzo; Laura G. | Fabio; Yoridan; Laura Z. | ~~Kenzo~~; ~~Curvy~~; ~~Oriana~~ | Caeli; Curvy | Nominated | Kenzo; Yoridan; Luis | Celinee; Luis; Horacio | Evicted (Day 49) | | | | | | | | | | | | | | | |
| Jailyne | Kenny; Oriana; Zoe; Sergio | Stefano; Laura G. Yoridan | Sergio; Horacio; Luis | ~~Curvy~~; ~~Celinee~~; ~~Kenzo~~ | Curvy; Caeli | No nominations | Caeli; Laura Z. Horacio | Evicted (Day 42) | | | | | | | | | | | | | | | | |
| Oriana | Divo; Celinee; Curvy | ~~Lupita~~; ~~Horacio~~; ~~Julia~~ | Caeli; Laura Z. Celinee | Not eligible | Caeli; Curvy | Nominated | Evicted (Day 37) | | | | | | | | | | | | | | | | | |
| Kunno | Celinee; Divo; Julia | Lupita; Julia; Horacio | Celinee; Caeli; Kenzo | ~~Celinee~~; ~~Fabio~~; ~~Oriana~~ | Horacio; Caeli | Evicted (Day 35) | | | | | | | | | | | | | | | | | | |
| Vanessa | Josh; Kenzo; Horacio | Stefano; Fabio; Kenzo | Fabio; Yoridan; Divo | ~~Caeli~~; ~~Curvy~~; ~~Celinee~~ | Evicted (Day 28) | | | | | | | | | | | | | | | | | | | |
| Sergio | Kenzo; Horacio; Josh | ~~Stefano~~; ~~Laura G.~~; ~~Fabio~~ | Jailyne; Julia; Laura Z. | Evicted (Day 21) | | | | | | | | | | | | | | | | | | | | |
| Lupita | Oriana; Celinee; Sergio | ~~Fabio~~; ~~Stefano~~; ~~Laura G.~~ | Evicted (Day 14) | | | | | | | | | | | | | | | | | | | | | |
| Zoe | Divo; Celinee; Julia | Evicted (Day 7) | | | | | | | | | | | | | | | | | | | | | | |
| Notes | 1, 2 | 3, 4 | none | 5 | 6 | 7, 8 | | 9 | 10, 11 | 10, 12, 13 | 14, 15 | 16, 17, 18, 19 | 20, 21, 22 | 23, 24 | 25, 26 | 27, 28 | 29, 30, 31, 32 | | none | | | | | |
| Head of Household | Jailyne | Celinee | Stefano | Divo | Kenzo | Kenny | | Kenny | Laura G. | Horacio | Divo | Josh | Yoridan | Sandra | Josh | Fabio | None | | | | | | | |
| Nominated | Kenny; Oriana; Celinee; Divo; Sergio; Zoe | Kunno; Curvy; Fabio; Kenny; Kenzo; Laura G. Laura Z. Lupita; Oriana; Sergio; Stefano | Josh; Celinee; Fabio; Julia; Jailyne; Caeli; Sergio | Caeli; Celinee; Curvy; Divo; Fabio; Horacio; Jailyne; Josh; Julia; Kenny; Kenzo; Kunno; Laura G. Laura Z. Luis; Oriana; Stefano; Vanessa; Yoridan | Oriana; Fabio; Julia; Caeli; Curvy; Horacio; Kunno | None | Fabio; Stefano; Caeli; Divo; Curvy; Jailyne; Laura Z. | Stefano; Laura G. Julia; Fabio; Celinee; Divo | Kenny; Yoridan; Fabio; Kenzo; Caeli; Divo; Stefano; Luis; Celinee; Curvy; Horacio; Josh; Laura Z. | Stefano; Divo; Laura G. Yoridan; Josh; Caeli; Celinee; Kenny | Horacio; Fabio; Kenzo; Curvy; Caeli; Celinee; Josh; Kenny | Horacio; Fabio; Yoridan; Celinee; Stefano; Curvy; Divo; Kenny; Luis | Josh; Celinee; Verónica; Stefano; Horacio; Lorena; Fabio; Sandra | Celinee; Caeli; Curvy; Verónica; Stefano; Jeni | Yoridan; Caeli; Fabio; Sandra; Stefano; Horacio; Kenny; Verónica | Luis; Yoridan; Caeli; Curvy; Stefano; Josh; Verónica | Fabio; Horacio; Josh; Verónica; Yoridan; Kenny | Fabio; Josh; Yoridan; Kenny | None | | | | | |
| Power to Save Holder | Horacio | Yoridan | Stefano | Divo | Kenzo | None | Kenny | Kenny | Laura G. | Sol | Divo | Josh | Yoridan | Yoridan | Stefano | Horacio | Horacio | None | | | | | | |
| Saved | Celinee | Laura Z. | Fabio | Divo | Caeli | None | Caeli | Celinee | Stefano | Divo | Fabio | Curvy | Fabio | Stefano | Stefano | Curvy | Horacio | None | | | | | | |
| Against public vote | Kenny; Oriana; Divo; Sergio; Zoe | Kunno; Curvy; Fabio; Kenny; Kenzo; Laura G. Lupita; Oriana; Sergio; Stefano | Josh; Celinee; Julia; Jailyne; Caeli; Sergio | Caeli; Celinee; Curvy; Fabio; Horacio; Jailyne; Josh; Julia; Kenny; Kenzo; Kunno; Laura G. Laura Z. Luis; Oriana; Stefano; Vanessa; Yoridan | Oriana; Fabio; Julia; Curvy; Horacio; Kunno | Caeli; Celinee; Curvy; Fabio; Josh; Julia; Laura Z. Oriana | Fabio; Stefano; Divo; Curvy; Jailyne; Laura Z. | Stefano; Laura G. Julia; Fabio; Divo | Kenny; Yoridan; Fabio; Kenzo; Caeli; Divo; Luis; Celinee; Curvy; Horacio; Josh; Laura Z. | Stefano; Laura G. Yoridan; Josh; Caeli; Celinee; Kenny | Horacio; Kenzo; Curvy; Caeli; Celinee; Josh; Kenny | Horacio; Fabio; Yoridan; Celinee; Stefano; Divo; Kenny; Luis | Josh; Celinee; Verónica; Stefano; Horacio; Lorena; Sandra | Celinee; Caeli; Curvy; Verónica; Jeni | Yoridan; Caeli; Fabio; Sandra; Horacio; Kenny; Verónica | Luis; Yoridan; Caeli; Stefano; Josh; Verónica | Fabio; Josh; Verónica; Yoridan; Kenny | Fabio; Josh; Yoridan; Kenny | Celinee; Curvy; Fabio; Horacio; Josh; Luis; Stefano; Yoridan | Celinee; Fabio; Horacio; Josh; Luis; Stefano; Yoridan | Celinee; Fabio; Josh; Luis; Stefano; Yoridan | Celinee; Fabio; Josh; Luis; Yoridan | | |
| Evicted | Zoe; Fewest votes to save | Lupita; Fewest votes to save | Sergio; Fewest votes to save | Vanessa; Fewest votes to save | Kunno; Fewest votes to save | Oriana; Most votes to evict | Jailyne; Fewest votes to save | Julia; Fewest votes to save | Laura Z. Fewest votes to save | Laura G. Fewest votes to save | Kenzo; Fewest votes to save | Divo; Fewest votes to save | Lorena; Fewest votes to save | Jeni; Fewest votes to save | Sandra; Fewest votes to save | Caeli; Fewest votes to save | Verónica; Fewest votes to save | Kenny; Fewest votes to save | Curvy; 8th place | Horacio; 7th place | Stefano; 6th place | Yoridan; 5th place | Josh; 4th place | Luis; 3rd place |
| Evicted | Zoe; Fewest votes to save | Lupita; Fewest votes to save | Sergio; Fewest votes to save | Vanessa; Fewest votes to save | Kunno; Fewest votes to save | Oriana; Most votes to evict | Jailyne; Fewest votes to save | Julia; Fewest votes to save | Laura Z. Fewest votes to save | Laura G. Fewest votes to save | Kenzo; Fewest votes to save | Divo; Fewest votes to save | Lorena; Fewest votes to save | Jeni; Fewest votes to save | Sandra; Fewest votes to save | Caeli; Fewest votes to save | Verónica; Fewest votes to save | Kenny; Fewest votes to save | Curvy; 8th place | Horacio; 7th place | Stefano; 6th place | Celinee; Runner-up | | |
| Evicted | Zoe; Fewest votes to save | Lupita; Fewest votes to save | Sergio; Fewest votes to save | Vanessa; Fewest votes to save | Kunno; Fewest votes to save | Oriana; Most votes to evict | Jailyne; Fewest votes to save | Julia; Fewest votes to save | Laura Z. Fewest votes to save | Laura G. Fewest votes to save | Kenzo; Fewest votes to save | Divo; Fewest votes to save | Lorena; Fewest votes to save | Jeni; Fewest votes to save | Sandra; Fewest votes to save | Caeli; Fewest votes to save | Verónica; Fewest votes to save | Kenny; Fewest votes to save | Curvy; 8th place | Horacio; 7th place | Stefano; 6th place | Fabio; Winner | | |

- ^Note 1: On Day 1, Jailyne answered the purple phone and became the Head of Household. Additionally she nominated Kenny for eviction.
- ^Note 2: On Day 3, Fabio and Yoridan were rewarded with an extra point to use in their nominations. Fabio used his extra point on Divo, giving him a total of 4 points, while Yoridan used his extra point on Lupita, giving her a total of 4 points.
- ^Note 3: On Day 8, Luis entered the house as a new housemate. He was immune from eviction and was ineligible to nominate.
- ^Note 4: In Week 2, several housemates conspired and discussed their nominations to rig the results, which is against the rules. As a result, they had their nominations voided, and were automatically put up for eviction.
- ^Note 5: In Week 4, due to constant warnings from La Jefa to tone down the violence in the house, nomination votes were annulled and all housemates were automatically nominated for eviction, including Divo, the HoH. In addition, Oriana was unable to nominate because she questioned La Jefa and did not follow her instructions.
- ^Note 6: In Week 5, Caeli, Celinee, Curvy, Fabio, Jailyne, Josh, Julia, Kunno, Laura G., Laura Z., Oriana and Stefano were only able to nominate with 3 and 2 points due to breaking the Magna Carta rules.
- ^Note 7: On Day 35, La Jefa automatically put up Caeli, Celinee, Curvy, Fabio, Josh, Julia, Laura Z. and Oriana for eviction due to their constant verbal and physical altercations. The public vote would be to decide who they want to evict, instead of the usual vote to save.
- ^Note 8: On Day 37, Caeli, Celinee, Curvy, Josh, Julia and Laura Z. automatically received 3 penalty nomination points against them as part of their punishment for their verbal and physical altercations. Divo and Laura G. were given the power to remove these points from the housemate of their choice. They chose to remove Julia's penalty points.
- ^Note 9: In Week 7, each housemate randomly chose a piggy bank containing an advantage or disadvantage inside:
  - Caeli chose Kenzo to nominate again. He nominated Yoridan with 3 points, Fabio with 2 points and Celinee with a point.
  - Celinee was given two nomination points to use on a housemate from the Water bedroom; she nominated Divo.
  - Curvy's nomination points were doubled, giving 6 points to Laura G., 4 points to Julia and 2 points to Fabio.
  - Divo's nominations were annulled.
  - Horacio stayed in the confession room to hear the next housemate's nominations, which was Laura G. Additionally, his Exile reward allowed him to pick a bonus piggy bank, which removed one nomination point against him.
  - Josh was allowed to hear the next housemate's nominations, which was Fabio.
  - Julia chose Horacio to share his nominations with the house.
  - Fabio and Kenny's original nominations were annulled and they had to nominate three different housemates.
  - Kenzo's points against Divo were annulled.
  - Laura G. and Luis' nominations were not affected.
  - Laura Z. was given 3 extra nomination points but had to nominate the housemate in front of the house. She nominated Divo.
  - Stefano was given an extra nomination point to use on a housemate from his own room; he nominated Fabio.
  - Yoridan had to share his nominations with the entire house.
- ^Note 10: This week, each housemate had three nomination points to give to two housemates, the first receiving 2 points and the second receiving a single point.
- ^Note 11: In Week 8, a roulette wheel determined that three additional housemates would be up for eviction.
- ^Note 12: Due to taking part in the Housemate Exchange with Gran Hermano Argentina, Fabio was immune from eviction and was ineligible to nominate.
- ^Note 13: On Day 58, Sol from Gran Hermano Argentina entered the house and was allowed to participate in the nominations. She nominated Josh with 2 points and Divo with a point. Additionally, on Day 62, she competed in the final round of the Power to Save competition.
- ^Note 14: On Day 64, Stefano was offered the Temptation Box in exchange for nominating with 3 points a housemate from his bedroom. He nominated Fabio.
- ^Note 15: In Week 10, each housemate had to spin a wheel that determined the number of points given to their nominations. The results were:
  - Caeli: -1 point to Yoridan and +2 points to Stefano
  - Celinee: -2 points to Yoridan and +3 points to Stefano
  - Curvy: +1 point to Yoridan and -1 point to Stefano
  - Divo: -3 points to Luis and -1 point to Kenny
  - Fabio: -2 points to Caeli and -1 point to Kenny
  - Horacio: -2 points to Stefano and +2 points to Kenzo
  - Josh: -3 points to Stefano and -2 points to Yoridan
  - Kenny: +2 points to Fabio and -2 points to Yoridan
  - Kenzo: -3 points to Stefano and -3 points to Yoridan
  - Luis: 0 points to Stefano and +2 points to Yoridan
  - Stefano: +2 points to Kenzo and -3 points to Josh
  - Yoridan: -2 points to Celinee and +1 point to Josh
- ^Note 16: On Day 65, Horacio was automatically nominated for eviction in Week 11 due to his gesture warning other housemates about the nomination roulette wheel.
- ^Note 17: On Day 71, Horacio was offered the Temptation Box in exchange for nominating with 3 points a housemate from his bedroom. He nominated Kenny.
- ^Note 18: On Day 71, Jeni, Lorena, Sandra and Verónica entered the house as new housemates. They were immune from eviction and were ineligible to nominate.
- ^Note 19: In Week 11, the first nominated housemate received 2 points, while the points for the second nominated housemate were randomly determined by small safes containing the number of points to be given. The results were:
  - Caeli: 1 point to Kenny
  - Celinee: 2 points to Stefano
  - Curvy: 1 point to Caeli
  - Divo: 1 point to Luis
  - Fabio: 0 points to Luis
  - Horacio: 0 points to Luis
  - Josh: 2 points to Yoridan
  - Kenny: 0 points to Stefano
  - Luis: 2 points to Divo
  - Stefano: 1 point to Luis
  - Yoridan: 2 points to Luis
- ^Note 20: On Day 77, Josh and Luis answered the Red Phone. Josh was automatically nominated for eviction, while Luis received immunity.
- ^Note 21: On Day 78, Curvy was offered the Temptation Box in exchange for nominating with 3 points a housemate from her bedroom. She nominated Horacio.
- ^Note 22: In Week 12, the first nominated housemate received 2 points, while the second received one point. Afterwards, the housemates nominated a third housemate in front of the entire house, with a roulette wheel determining the points to be given. The results were:
  - Caeli: +3 points to Horacio
  - Celinee: +3 points to Sandra
  - Curvy: +2 points to Stefano
  - Fabio: +1 point to Lorena
  - Horacio: -1 point to Caeli
  - Jeni: -2 points to Horacio
  - Josh: -3 points to Caeli
  - Kenny: -3 points to Caeli
  - Lorena: 0 points to Stefano
  - Luis:-3 points to Caeli
  - Sandra: -2 points to Horacio
  - Stefano: +3 points to Verónica
  - Verónica: 0 points to Jeni
  - Yoridan: +2 points to Horacio
- ^Note 23: On Day 85, Celinee was offered the Temptation Box in exchange for nominating with 3 points a housemate from her bedroom. She nominated Josh.
- ^Note 24: In Week 13, the housemates participated in the "Nominations of Terror", where they could add or remove three points from their first nominee. Curvy removed three points against Kenny, Jeni removed three points against Fabio, while the rest of the housemates nominated their first nominee with three points.
- ^Note 25: On Day 92, Yoridan was offered the Temptation Box in exchange for nominating with 3 points a housemate from his bedroom. He nominated Caeli.
- ^Note 26: In Week 14, the housemates had to search in a ball pit for balls that would indicate whether they would nominate with positive or negative points. In the first round, they had 20 seconds to find a -1 or +1 ball, while in the second round they had 30 seconds to find a -2 or +2 ball in addition to 1 point balls, and in the third round they had 40 seconds to find a -3 or +3 ball in addition to 1 and 2 point balls. If a housemate failed to find a ball by the end of the allotted time, they could not nominate in that round. The results were:
  - Caeli: +1 to Curvy
  - Celinee: +1 to Caeli, +1 to Sandra
  - Curvy: -2 to Luis, +1 to Sandra
  - Fabio: +1 to Verónica, -1 to Stefano
  - Horacio: -2 to Curvy, +1 to Stefano
  - Josh: +3 to Sandra, +1 to Fabio, +1 to Stefano
  - Kenny: -3 to Verónica, +1 to Stefano
  - Luis: +1 to Sandra, 1 to Fabio, +1 to Caeli
  - Sandra: +2 to Verónica, +1 Celinee, +1 to Curvy
  - Stefano: -3 to Sandra, +2 to Horacio, +1 to Verónica
  - Verónica: +1 to Fabio, +1 to Stefano
  - Yoridan: +2 to Luis, +2 to Kenny, 1 to Verónica
- ^Note 27: On Day 97, Luis was offered the Temptation Box in exchange for nominating with 3 points a housemate from his bedroom. He nominated Josh.
- ^Note 28: In Week 15, the housemates friends and family members joined the nomination process. Each housemate nominated for two points, while their family member nominated for one point.
- ^Note 29: On Day 106, Luis won the final competition, winning immunity from the final eviction and granting him a place in the finale.
- ^Note 30: In Week 16, the housemates voted for who they wanted to save from nomination. The five housemates with the fewest points were nominated for eviction. Additionally, this was a Double Eviction week. Following the first eviction on Day 109, the remaining nominees face the public vote for a second eviction on Day 111.
- ^Note 31: On Day 107, Yoridan won the power to double his positive nomination points, giving 4 points to Stefano and 2 points to Fabio.
- ^Note 32: On Day 109, Horacio won a special competition, saving himself from the Double Eviction week and granting him a place in the finale.

== Total received nominations ==
| | Week 1 | Week 2 | Week 3 | Week 4 | Week 5 | Week 6 | Week 7 | Week 8 | Week 9 | Week 10 | Week 11 | Week 12 | Week 13 | Week 14 | Week 15 | Week 16 | Week 17 Final | Total |
|---|---|---|---|---|---|---|---|---|---|---|---|---|---|---|---|---|---|---|
| Fabio | 4 | 24 | 16 | 13 | 23 | 0 | 14 | 8 | 0 | 5 | 0 | 5 | 4 | 3 | 0 | 4 | Winner | 123 |
| Celinee | 20 | 0 | 16 | 13 | 0 | 3 | 10 | 0 | 1 | -2 | 6 | 0 | 0 | 1 | 2 | 5 | Runner-up | 77 |
| Luis | Not in House | 0 | 4 | 2 | 0 | 1 | 5 | 2 | 0 | -3 | 4 | 0 | 3 | 0 | 0 | 0 | 3rd Place | 21 |
| Josh | 5 | 0 | 0 | 0 | 2 | 4 | 0 | 0 | 3 | -2 | 0 | 0 | 5 | 0 | 3 | 3 | 4th Place | 25 |
| Yoridan | 2 | 3 | 4 | 2 | 0 | 3 | 5 | 10 | 8 | -7 | 8 | 0 | 4 | 0 | 9 | 2 | 5th Place | 60 |
| Stefano | 1 | 21 | 0 | 13 | 2 | 18 | 0 | 4 | 0 | -4 | 6 | 9 | 9 | 3 | 4 | 6 | 6th Place | 96 |
| Horacio | 5 | 13 | 4 | 0 | 9 | 1 | 4-1 | 0 | 0 | 0 | 0 | 8 | 3 | 2 | 2 | 4 | 7th Place | 54 |
| Curvy | 1 | 0 | 0 | 11 | 13 | 11 | 1 | 0 | 0 | 0 | 4 | 0 | 10 | 0 | 4 | 7 | 8th Place | 62 |
| Kenny | 0 | 3 | 0 | 3 | 0 | 0 | 0 | 0 | 1 | -2 | 4 | 0 | 2 | 2 | 2 | 0 | Evicted | 17 |
| Verónica | Not in House | | | | | | | | | | 0 | 10 | 10 | 2 | 3 | 2 | Evicted | 27 |
| Caeli | 0 | 0 | 11 | 9 | 16 | 16 | 4 | 6 | 1 | -2 | 1 | -4 | 13 | 5 | 7 | Evicted | | 89 |
| Sandra | Not in House | | | | | | | | | | 0 | 5 | 0 | 3 | Evicted | | | 8 |
| Jeni | Not in House | | | | | | | | | | 0 | 4 | 6 | Evicted | | | | 10 |
| Lorena | Not in House | | | | | | | | | | 0 | 8 | Evicted | | | | | 8 |
| Divo | 17 | 0 | 1 | 0 | 0 | 14 | 10 | 5 | 14 | 0 | 4 | Evicted | | | | | | 65 |
| Kenzo | 7 | 7 | 7 | 12 | 0 | 4 | 4 | 7 | 0 | 4 | Evicted | | | | | | | 52 |
| Laura G. | 0 | 18 | 9 | 2 | 0 | 7 | 22 | 0 | 11 | Evicted | | | | | | | | 69 |
| Laura Z. | 0 | 0 | 5 | 0 | 3 | 10 | 1 | 0 | Evicted | | | | | | | | | 19 |
| Julia | 5 | 13 | 13 | 4 | 17 | 9 | 19 | Evicted | | | | | | | | | | 80 |
| Jailyne | 0 | 0 | 12 | 2 | 2 | 10 | Evicted | | | | | | | | | | | 26 |
| Oriana | 21 | 0 | 2 | 14 | 0 | Evicted | | | | | | | | | | | | 37 |
| Kunno | 4 | 0 | 4 | 8 | 9 | Evicted | | | | | | | | | | | | 25 |
| Vanessa | 7 | 1 | 1 | 0 | Evicted | | | | | | | | | | | | | 9 |
| Sergio | 12 | 0 | 11 | Evicted | | | | | | | | | | | | | | 23 |
| Lupita | 6 | 17 | Evicted | | | | | | | | | | | | | | | 23 |
| Zoe | 11 | Evicted | | | | | | | | | | | | | | | | 11 |

== Episodes ==
| No. overall | No. in season | Title | Original release date |
|---|---|---|---|
Week 1
| 424 | 1 | "Nueva era de La Casa" | February 17, 2026 |
| 425 | 2 | "El drama no se hace esperar" | February 18, 2026 |
| 426 | 3 | "Fuego en las nominaciones" | February 19, 2026 |
| 427 | 4 | "El robo de la salvación" | February 20, 2026 |
| 428 | 5 | "Duelo con Jailyne por la salvación" | February 22, 2026 |
| 429 | 6 | "Al borde de la primera eliminación" | February 23, 2026 |
Week 2
| 430 | 7 | "Una salida y un nuevo ingreso" | February 24, 2026 |
| 431 | 8 | "Tormenta en las nominaciones" | February 25, 2026 |
| 432 | 9 | "Primeros posicionamientos" | February 26, 2026 |
| 433 | 10 | "Sinceramientos al límite" | February 27, 2026 |
| 434 | 11 | "Celinee ante un duelo decisivo" | March 1, 2026 |
| 435 | 12 | "Golpe de poder y eliminación" | March 2, 2026 |
Week 3
| 436 | 13 | "Pulso por el liderazgo" | March 3, 2026 |
| 437 | 14 | "Estrategias de cara a la nominación" | March 4, 2026 |
| 438 | 15 | "El reino de la traición" | March 5, 2026 |
| 439 | 16 | "Duelo de titanes" | March 6, 2026 |
| 440 | 17 | "Enfrentamiento sin fin" | March 8, 2026 |
| 441 | 18 | "La Casa a punto de estallar" | March 9, 2026 |
Week 4
| 442 | 19 | "La salida de Sergio deja huella" | March 10, 2026 |
| 443 | 20 | "Nominaciones tóxicas" | March 11, 2026 |
| 444 | 21 | "Todos en la cuerda floja" | March 12, 2026 |
| 445 | 22 | "Contra El Divo por la salvación" | March 13, 2026 |
| 446 | 23 | "La Casa sigue en pie de guerra" | March 15, 2026 |
| 447 | 24 | "Gala de quiebre en La Casa" | March 16, 2026 |
Week 5
| 448 | 25 | "Todo por encontrarla" | March 17, 2026 |
| 449 | 26 | "La casa arde en la quinta nominación" | March 18, 2026 |
| 450 | 27 | "En jaque ante el posicionamiento" | March 19, 2026 |
| 451 | 28 | "Trío en la batalla por la salvación" | March 20, 2026 |
| 452 | 29 | "Aislamiento en la mira" | March 22, 2026 |
| 453 | 30 | "Sin aliento por la eliminación" | March 23, 2026 |
Week 6
| 454 | 31 | "En riesgo de expulsión" | March 24, 2026 |
| 455 | 32 | "Decide el voto popular" | March 25, 2026 |
| 456 | 33 | "Una salida polémica" | March 26, 2026 |
| 457 | 34 | "En busca del poder" | March 27, 2026 |
| 458 | 35 | "Destierro en medio del caos" | March 29, 2026 |
| 459 | 36 | "Bandos en máxima tensión" | March 30, 2026 |
Week 7
| 460 | 37 | "Emociones encontradas tras un adiós" | March 31, 2026 |
| 461 | 38 | "Se agitan los ánimos" | April 1, 2026 |
| 462 | 39 | "Más peleas en La Casa" | April 2, 2026 |
| 463 | 40 | "En combate por la salvación" | April 3, 2026 |
| 464 | 41 | "Sin frenos en plena eliminación" | April 6, 2026 |
Week 8
| 465 | 42 | "Julia libera emociones" | April 7, 2026 |
| 466 | 43 | "Incertidumbre en el aire" | April 8, 2026 |
| 467 | 44 | "Placa de alto voltaje" | April 9, 2026 |
| 468 | 45 | "Secuelas en cadena" | April 10, 2026 |
| 469 | 46 | "Laura G frente al duelo clave" | April 12, 2026 |
| 470 | 47 | "Tensión a gran escala" | April 13, 2026 |
Week 9
| 471 | 48 | "Devastados" | April 14, 2026 |
| 472 | 49 | "Golpe de mando" | April 15, 2026 |
| 473 | 50 | "La primera bomba de Sol" | April 16, 2026 |
| 474 | 51 | "Stefano en la línea de fuego" | April 17, 2026 |
| 475 | 52 | "Horacio lucha por la salvación" | April 19, 2026 |
| 476 | 53 | "Especulaciones en escalada" | April 20, 2026 |
Week 10
| 477 | 54 | "Un habitante toma el control" | April 21, 2026 |
| 478 | 55 | "El Divo toma ventaja" | April 22, 2026 |
| 479 | 56 | "Traiciones bajo la lupa" | April 23, 2026 |
| 480 | 57 | "Robo en juego y visita sorpresa" | April 24, 2026 |
| 481 | 58 | "Duelo clave y anuncio en La Casa" | April 26, 2026 |
| 482 | 59 | "Eliminación dramática" | April 27, 2026 |
Week 11
| 483 | 60 | "Uno se va y cuatro entran" | April 28, 2026 |
| 484 | 61 | "El nuevo líder mueve sus fichas" | April 29, 2026 |
| 485 | 62 | "Las recién llegadas buscan ventaja" | April 30, 2026 |
| 486 | 63 | "Secretos de las nuevas" | May 1, 2026 |
| 487 | 64 | "Duelo contra Lorena y Josh" | May 3, 2026 |
| 488 | 65 | "Sorpresa en medio de la eliminación" | May 4, 2026 |
Week 12
| 489 | 66 | "Impacto tras la salida de El Divo" | May 5, 2026 |
| 490 | 67 | "Choques en cadena" | May 6, 2026 |
| 491 | 68 | "Josh en zona de choque" | May 7, 2026 |
| 492 | 69 | "Todos quieren salvarse" | May 8, 2026 |
| 493 | 70 | "Opiniones encontradas" | May 10, 2026 |
| 494 | 71 | "Nominados bajo la lupa" | May 11, 2026 |
Week 13
| 495 | 72 | "Un adiós repentino" | May 12, 2026 |
| 496 | 73 | "Alianzas y estrategias que tiemblan" | May 13, 2026 |
| 497 | 74 | "De cara al terror" | May 14, 2026 |
| 498 | 75 | "Un paseo en globo por el robo" | May 15, 2026 |
| 499 | 76 | "La placa da un giro" | May 17, 2026 |
| 500 | 77 | "Una habitante se va" | May 18, 2026 |
Week 14
| 501 | 78 | "Batalla en nuevo territorio" | May 19, 2026 |
| 502 | 79 | "Circuitos de alto voltaje" | May 20, 2026 |
| 503 | 80 | "Doble mudanza" | May 21, 2026 |
| 504 | 81 | "Pirámide bajo presión" | May 22, 2026 |
| 505 | 82 | "Duelo contra Josh y Stefano" | May 24, 2026 |
| 506 | 83 | "Tensión rumbo a un adiós" | May 25, 2026 |
Week 15
| 507 | 84 | "Guerra por el liderazgo" | May 26, 2026 |
| 508 | 85 | "Un giro redefine la placa" | May 27, 2026 |
| 509 | 86 | "Duelo decisivo" | May 28, 2026 |
| 510 | 87 | "Contraataque por la salvación" | May 29, 2026 |
| 511 | 88 | "Un lugar menos en la placa" | May 31, 2026 |
| 512 | 89 | "Todo o nada" | June 1, 2026 |
Week 16
| 513 | 90 | "El primer boleto a la final" | June 2, 2026 |
| 514 | 91 | "Nominaciones cruciales" | June 3, 2026 |
| 515 | 92 | "Frente a frente por última vez" | June 4, 2026 |
| 516 | 93 | "La recta final toma forma" | June 5, 2026 |
| 517 | 94 | "Cada despedida acerca la final" | June 7, 2026 |
Week 17
| 518 | 95 | "Visitas que alteran el juego" | June 8, 2026 |
| 519 | 96 | "Sentimientos opuestos en La Casa" | June 9, 2026 |
| 520 | 97 | "A un paso de la final" | June 10, 2026 |
| 521 | 98 | "El premio tiene dueño" | June 11, 2026 |
