= Gran Hermano (Argentine TV series) season 6 =

Gran Hermano
- Season 6
- Presented by: Jorge Rial
- No. of days: 141
- No. of housemates: 22
- Winner: Cristian Urrizaga
- Runner-up: Emiliano Boscatto

Release
- Original network: Telefe
- Original release: December 12, 2010 – May 1, 2011

Season chronology
- Next → Season 7

The sixth season of Gran Hermano Argentina premiered on Sunday December 12, 2010 hosted by Jorge Rial. For the first two weeks after the premiere, the Gala will be hosted by Marley due to Rial taking a holiday. It began on 12 December 2010, and the prize money for the series is 400,000 Argentine pesos (100,680 USD). The season ended on Sunday May 1, 2011 after lasting 141 days, becoming the longest series ever produced in the Americas. Also, third place, Martín Anchorena became the housemate that has stayed the longest in a Big Brother house in the Americas, at that time, by staying all.

On Day 50, Juan Pablo left the House, since he wanted to go back to his studies and during his stay, he repeatedly announced his intentions of leaving. After Cristian U. walked out of the House on Day 58, a repechage process began on Day 62, and the two housemates that decided to leave voluntarily were also asked to be part of this process. At the end of Day 62's live nominations show, only Juan Pablo decided to stay out of the repechage and evicted housemates Rocío, Ariana, Leandro, Natalí, Christian Y., Emiliano, and Gisele with walkee Cristian U. were put up for public vote to see who will be the two returning, it was announced that Cristian U., Emiliano, Gisele, and Rocío were the elected ones to go back in with the final decision to be revealed on Day 64's live eviction show.

On Day 64 (February 13, 2011) the four finalists of the repechage vote entered the house. Cristian U. and Rocío were the ones originally returning, he obtained 74,37% of all votes while she obtained 9,11% with Gisele and Emiliano obtaining 4,21% and 5,15% respectively. After their re-entrance, Jésica voluntarily left the house alleging she was missing her son.

On Day 127 (April 17, 2011), Solange Abraham became the women that has survived the longest number of days in a BB edition held on the Western Hemisphere by surviving from Day 1 until Day 127 when she was evicted, and this will be the first edition in Argentina in which all finalist are from the same gender, in this case, males.

On Day 141 (May 1, 2011), the final 3, Cristian U., Emiliano and Martín A. all received monetary prizes, Martín A. received 50,000 Argentine pesos, Emiliano received 90,000 Argentine pesos, the amount he received is not the one he was supposed to receive as the runner-up because he spent some days outside the house this also happened to winner Cristian U. that received 382,357 Argentine pesos instead of the original 400,000 Argentine pesos of the prize.

== Housemates ==
For this season, the producers allowed citizens from countries other than Argentina to audition to be on the show. The producers were looking specifically for housemates that were between the ages of 18 and 35.

Name	Age	Occupation	Resident	Day entered	Day exited	Status
Cristian Urrizaga	30	Dog Trainer	Buenos Aires Autonomous City	64	141	Winner
Cristian Urrizaga	30	Dog Trainer	Buenos Aires Autonomous City	1	58	Walked
Emiliano Boscatto	29	Designer	Córdoba	64	141	Runner-up
Emiliano Boscatto	29	Designer	Córdoba	1	50	Evicted
Martín Anchorena	24	Model/Pilot	Buenos Aires Autonomous City	1	141	Third Place
Martín Pepa	23	Student/Model	La Pampa	1	141	Fourth Place
Solange Abraham	21	Chef	Tucumán	1	127	Evicted
Gisele Marchi	22	Student	Buenos Aires	64	120	Evicted
Gisele Marchi	22	Student	Buenos Aires	1	57	Evicted
Tamara Casasola	19	Model	Jujuy	1	113	Evicted
Pamela Bevilacqua	21	Bartender	Córdoba	1	106	Evicted
Alejandro Iglesias	26	Unemployed	Buenos Aires	1	99	Evicted
Jonatan Galiano	22	Student	Buenos Aires	1	92	Evicted
Luz Ríos	22	Dancer	Buenos Aires Autonomous City	1	85	Evicted
Loreley Donate	24	Model	Buenos Aires	1	78	Evicted
Jonatan Kok	25	Model	Buenos Aires	50	76	Walked
Rocío Gancedo	21	Gift Shop's Cashier	Buenos Aires	64	72	Walked
Rocío Gancedo	21	Gift Shop's Cashier	Buenos Aires	1	15	Evicted
Emanuel di Gioia	26	Mechanic	Buenos Aires	1	71	Evicted
Constanza Álvarez	23	Dancer	Corrientes	50	64	Evicted
Jésica Hereñu	27	Dancer	Buenos Aires Autonomous City	1	64	Walked
Juan Migliavacca	27	Photographer, Student	Buenos Aires	1	50	Walked
Christian Yáñez	25	Disc jockey	Buenos Aires	1	43	Evicted
Natalí Kessler	22	Forensic Criminologist	Santa Fé	1	36	Evicted
Leandro Pigó	26	P.E. Teacher	Buenos Aires	1	29	Evicted
Ariana Fiorentino	23	Model	Buenos Aires Autonomous City	1	22	Evicted

== Nominations Table ==
Housemates nominate for 2 and 1 Point(s), shown in descending order in the Nomination Box. The two or more Housemates with the most Nomination Points will face the Public Vote.

	Week 2	Week 3	Week 4	Week 5	Week 6	Week 7	Week 8	Week 9	Week 10	Week 11	Week 12	Week 13	Week 14	Week 15	Week 16	Week 17	Week 18	Final		Nominations received
Cristian U.	Rocío; Gisele	Pamela; Ariana	Refused	Refused	Refused	Refused	Refused	Walked (Day 58)	Refused	Refused	~~Refused~~	Refused	~~Emiliano~~; ~~Alejandro~~; ~~Tamara~~	Solange; Emiliano	~~Tamara~~; ~~Emiliano~~	Refused	Emiliano; Solange	Winner (Day 141)		25
Emiliano	Alejandro; Cristian U.	Alejandro; Tamara	Cristian U. Alejandro	Jésica; Alejandro	Alejandro; Luz	~~Luz~~; ~~Gisele~~	Evicted (Day 50)		Refused	~~Jonathan K.~~	~~Alejandro~~; ~~Luz~~	Gisele; Martin A. Martin P.	Refused	Refused	Gisele; Martin P.	Refused	Martín A.	Runner-up (Day 141)		21
Martín A.	Pamela; Juan	Pamela; Gisele	Pamela; Gisele	Pamela; Natalí	Emiliano; Solange	Jonatan; Emiliano	Solange; Pamela	Jonathan K. Constanza	Emanuel; Tamara	Refused	Alejandro; Luz	Emiliano; Alejandro	Emiliano; Alejandro	Solange; Cristian U.	Emiliano; Tamara; Solange	Solange	Solange; Emiliano	Third Place (Day 141)		8
Martín P.	Gisele; Rocío	Solange; Gisele	Cristian U. Solange	Luz; Gisele	Gisele; Pamela	Gisele; Pamela	Gisele; Luz	Constanza; Jonathan K.	Refused	Jonathan K. Cristian U.	Alejandro; Luz	Jonatan G.	Refused	Cristian U. Solange; Pamela	Emiliano; Tamara	Solange; Gisele	Solange; Emiliano	Fourth Place (Day 141)		16
Solange	Jésica; Tamara	Gisele; Pamela	Pamela; Gisele	~~Gisele~~; ~~Luz~~	~~Luz~~; ~~Martín A.~~	~~Luz~~; ~~Gisele~~	Luz; Gisele	Martín A. Alejandro	Refused	Refused	Gisele; Pamela	Martin P. Gisele	Refused	Refused	Emiliano; Tamara	Gisele; Martín P.	Refused	Evicted (Day 127)		67
Gisele	Tamara; Martín P.	Ariana; Solange	Leandro; Solange	Juan; Solange	Cristian U. Juan	Emiliano; Tamara	Martín P Cristian U.	Evicted (Day 57)	Refused	Jonathan K. Martín P.	Alejandro; Luz; Jonatan G.	Alejandro; Solange	Emiliano; Solange	Emiliano	Emiliano; Tamara	Emiliano; Solange; Martín P.	Evicted (Day 120)			33
Tamara	Pamela; Natalí	Pamela; Ariana	Solange; Jonatan	Natalí; Emanuel	Christian Y. Gisele	Juan; Jonatan	Jonatan; Gisele	Constanza; Jonathan K.	Solange; Gisele	Jonathan K. Martín A.	Gisele; Pamela	Martin P. Martin A.	Refused	~~Gisele~~; ~~Martin P.~~	Martín P.	Evicted (Day 113)				17
Pamela	Cristian U. Tamara	Ariana; Loreley	Solange; Leandro	Solange; Natalí	Tamara; Cristian U.	Cristian U. Tamara	Martín P. Loreley	Constanza; Jonathan K.	Refused	Tamara; Jonathan K.	Refused	Alejandro; Solange	Emiliano	Cristian U. Solange	Evicted (Day 106)					21
Alejandro	Emiliano; Jonatan	Emiliano; Jonatan	Leandro; Emiliano	Emiliano; Emanuel	Christian Y Martín P.	Emiliano; Solange	Martín P. Loreley	Jonathan K. Martín P.	Jonathan K. Jonatan G.	Jonathan K. Cristian U.	~~Cristian U.~~; ~~Martín P.~~	~~Martín P.~~; ~~Martín A.~~	Refused	Evicted (Day 99)						21
Jonatan	Alejandro; Jésica	Cristian U. Alejandro	Cristian U. Alejandro	Jésica; Tamara	Alejandro; Luz	Alejandro; Cristian U.	Luz; Alejandro	Jonathan K. Constanza	Refused	Jonathan K. Tamara	Gisele	Martin P. Martin A.	Evicted (Day 92)							12
Luz	Emiliano; Ariana	Ariana; Jonatan	Leandro; Emanuel	Natalí; Emanuel	Christian Y. Juan	Emiliano; Solange	Solange; Martín A.	Constanza; Jonathan K.	Refused	Jonathan K. Martín A.	Gisele; Pamela	Evicted (Day 85)								22
Loreley	Rocío; Pamela	Ariana; Pamela	Natalí; Pamela	Natalí; Solange	Solange; Pamela	Pamela; Solange	Pamela; Gisele	Jonathan K. Constanza	Refused	Refused	Evicted (Day 78)									3
Jonathan K.	Not in house						Exempt	Refused	Martín P. Emanuel	Refused	Walked (Day 76)									19
Rocío	Jésica; Tamara	Evicted (Day 15)							Refused	Walked (Day 73)										4
Emanuel	Gisele; Solange	Solange; Ariana	Luz; Gisele	Luz; Cristian U.	~~Juan~~; ~~Gisele~~	Luz; Gisele	Luz; Cristian U.	Jonathan K. Constanza	Cristian U. Rocío	Evicted (Day 71)										6
Constanza	Not in house						Exempt	Martín A. Jonathan K.	Evicted (Day 64)											8
Jésica	Rocío; Solange	Ariana; Solange	Juan; Jonatan	Jonatan; Juan	Juan; Gisele	Emiliano; Juan	Gisele; Alejandro	Martín A. Alejandro	Walked (Day 64)											8
Juan	Pamela; Solange	Refused	Refused	Cristian U. Luz	Refused	Tamara; Jésica	Walked (Day 50)													7
Christian Y.	Luz; Ariana	Jonatan; Solange	Alejandro; Tamara	Cristian U. Luz	~~Alejandro~~; ~~Luz~~	Evicted (Day 43)														3
Natalí	Tamara; Martín P.	Tamara; Jésica	Pamela; Gisele	~~Gisele~~; ~~Luz~~	Evicted (Day 36)															5
Leandro	Cristian U. Ariana	Ariana; Cristian U.	Cristian U Solange	Evicted (Day 29)																4
Ariana	Jésica; Tamara	Gisele; Jésica	Evicted (Day 22)																	11
Notes	1	none		2	3, 4, 5	6	7	none	8, 9, 10	10										
Nominated	Rociò; Solange	Ariana; Juan; Solange	Cristian U. Juan; Leandro; Solange	Cristian U. Natalì; Solange	Alejandro; Christian Y. Cristian U. Solange	Cristian U. Emiliano; Solange	Cristian U. Gisele; Solange	Constanza; Jonathan K. Solange	Cristian U. Emanuel; Emiliano; Gisele; Jonatan G. Jonathan K. Loreley; Luz; Martín P. Pamela; Rocío; Solange	Cristian U. Loreley; Martín A. Martín P. Solange	Gisele; Luz; Solange	Cristian U. Jonatan; Solange	Alejandro; Emiliano; Solange; Tamara	Cristian U. Pamela; Solange	Solange; Tamara	Cristian U. Gisele; Martín P. Solange	Emiliano; Martín A. Solange	Cristian U. Emiliano; Martín A. Martín P.		
Walked	none					Juan	Cristian U.	Jésica	none	Rocío, Jonathan K.	none									
Evicted	Rocio; 51.46% to evict	Ariana; 59.84% to evict	Leandro; 49.01% to evict	Natalí; 62.11% to evict	Christian Y. 49.95% to evict	Emiliano; 68.01% to evict	Gisele; 55.77% to evict	Costanza; 47.15% to evict	Emanuel; 73.68% to evict	Loreley; 49.46% to evict	Luz; 71.72% to evict	Jonathan; 69.02% to evict	Alejandro; 39.52% to evict	Pamela; 55.83% to evict	Tamara; 55.07% to evict	Gisele; 43.21% to evict	Solange; 51.35% (out of 2) to evict	Martín P. 8.32% (out of 4)	Martín A. 20.36% (out of 3)	
Evicted	Rocio; 51.46% to evict	Ariana; 59.84% to evict	Leandro; 49.01% to evict	Natalí; 62.11% to evict	Christian Y. 49.95% to evict	Emiliano; 68.01% to evict	Gisele; 55.77% to evict	Costanza; 47.15% to evict	Emanuel; 73.68% to evict	Loreley; 49.46% to evict	Luz; 71.72% to evict	Jonathan; 69.02% to evict	Alejandro; 39.52% to evict	Pamela; 55.83% to evict	Tamara; 55.07% to evict	Gisele; 43.21% to evict	Solange; 51.35% (out of 2) to evict	Emiliano; 47.37% to win	Cristian U. 52.63% to win	

^1 On the first round of nominations, Gisele and Natalí obtained two extra points in the nominations after one of them told Tamara that they were planning their votes.
^2 On the fourth round of nominations, Natalí's and Solange's votes were nullified after they committed a complot against Gisele and Luz.
^3 For the fifth round of nominations, Alejandro received immunity from being nominated and any vote cast against him will be nullified.
^4 For the fifth round of nominations, Alejandro lost his immunity after some housemates discovered it.
^5 For the fifth round of nominations, Christian Y., Emanuel and Solange's votes were nullified as they broke the rules by taking their microphones out and whispering between them some informations.
^6 For the sixth round of nominations, Emiliano and Solange's votes were nullified as they committed a complot against Gisele and Luz.
^7 For the seventh round of nominations, both Constanza and Jonathan K. won't either vote or be voted, for the following weeks nominations they're available to vote and be voted.
^8 For the ninth round of nominations, Cristian U, Emiliano, Gisele and Rocío as returning housemates, will nominate and can be nominated, but they won't take part in the cards process
^9 From the ninth round of nominations and on, Cristian U, Emiliano, Gisele and Rocío re-gain the chance of using the "fulminant" nomination, which consists of sending another housemate directly to the up for eviction list.
^10 For the tenth of nominations, an Immunity card will be obtained by any housemate that has been inside the House since Day 1.
