= Solange Abraham =

Argentine model (born 1988)

Solange Gómez Abraham (born December 30, 1988) is from Tucuman, Argentina. She rose to fame in 2010 after participating in the sixth season of the reality show Gran Hermano, Argentina's version of Big Brother. Previously, in 2008, he had participated in the American MTV blind-dating show Next.

== Life and career ==
=== 1988-2008: Early life ===
Solange Gómez Abraham was born on December 30, 1988, in Tucumán. She was the second child of Ruben Gómez and Norma Abraham. Her sister, Noelia, appeared in several TV shows while Solange was in the house, and said that she was "a wonderful girl, full of life". On his mother's side, he comes from a family Russian and Arab origin; he inherited the surname Abraham from his maternal grandfather.

=== Television ===
Solange attended the Big brother's casting in early 2011 and she was finally chosen to participate. The show was first aired on Telefe on December 12, 2011. It was again hosted by Jorge Rial and Solange was the 14th entrance. She quickly became one of the favourite contestants due to some discussions that she had with her housemates. After a difficult nomination she was evicted on April 17, becoming, until now, the woman that has survived the longest number of days in a BB edition held in the Western Hemisphere by surviving 127 days. She was the last eliminated.
