= Ivana Icardi =

Argentine reality TV personality (born 1995)

- Born: 2 June 1995 (age 31); Buenos Aires, Argentina
- Occupations: Reality TV Star; Influencer
- Years active: 2016–present
- Partner(s): Luifa Galessio (2016-2019); Hugo Sierra (2020-2022); Mario "Finito" Ramírez (2024-2025)
- Children: 1 (with Hugo Sierra)
- Relatives: Mauro Icardi (old brother)

Ivana Icardi Rivero (Rosario, June 2, 1995) is an Argentine and Spanish reality television personality and the sister of Mauro Icardi. She has participated in various reality shows in Argentina, Spain and Italy.

== Early life ==
Ivana is the daughter of Juan Carlos Icardi and Analía Rivero. In 2001, the two decided to move the family to the Canary Islands, where they lived up until their separation. After their marriage had ended, Juan Carlos decided to return to Rosario and opened a butcher shop, while Analía stayed in Spain, where she later married Emiliano Hernández.

Ivana has said in interviews that her childhood was marked by her parents' separation and that it affected her relationship with her father. On some TV shows, Ivana mentioned that she didn't always feel supported by him, and that family differences grew deeper over time.

Besides, Ivana has stated that the distance between her and Mauro started because of family conflicts and got worse with Wanda Nara's influence and media exposure. Today, their connection is practically nonexistent.

== Gran Hermano ==
Ivana is the runner-up of Gran Hermano Argentina (season 9). She later competed on Grande Fratello (season 16) and Gran Hermano Dúo 2. Every time Ivana has competed, it has been in a different country.

=== Gran Hermano 2016 ===
In 2016, Ivana moved to Argentina to participate in Gran Hermano Argentina (season 9). She became one of the most remembered protagonists: she made it to the final and ended up as the runner-up. Her time on the reality show marked the beginning of her media career.

She entered at 20, with the personal goal of no longer being seen just as “Mauro Icardi’s sister” and building her own media identity. She stayed for all 99 days of the season, becoming one of the central figures. She stood out for her strong personality and leadership, becoming a reference for the group known as Los Primos. Inside the house, she initially had a connection with Dante, which generated a lot of anticipation. Later, her love-hate relationship with Luifa Galesio became one of the main storylines of the show, with moments of tension and romance that marked her journey.

On August 24, 2016, Ivana came in second place with 39.8% of the votes, while Luifa won with 60.1%.

=== Grande Fratello 16 ===
After moving away from the media, in 2019, she entered Grande Fratello (season 16) in Italy.

She entered with the expectation of repeating her leading role in Italy. She stayed 22 days in the house, until April 29, 2019. She was the 4th contestant to be evicted from the season, with barely 14% of the votes in her favor in the televote, which marked an early exit. Her participation was marked by the media tension with Wanda Nara, her sister-in-law, who is very well-known in Italy. The Italian press highlighted that rivalry as part of the appeal of her entry.

From the first days, there was noticeable chemistry between Ivana and Gianmarco. They shared conversations and gestures of complicity that sparked rumors of a romance both inside and outside the house. Ivana clarified several times that she was interested in Gianmarco, but she also had doubts due to his personal situation outside the reality show with Luifa Galessio.

=== Gran Hermano Dúo 2 ===
In 2024, Ivana entered along with Luca Onestini, Gianmarco’s brother, as a contestant pair in Gran Hermano Dúo 2. That duo got a lot of attention because it mixed Ivana’s previous story with Gianmarco on Grande Fratello (season 16) and which immediately raised expectations because of the overlap in their histories and now she was competing with his brother.

In the first week, they were nominated and faced the public vote. The audience decided to evict Luca with 60% of the votes against him, while Ivana was saved and continued in the competition.

After Luca left, Ivana was paired in a new duo with "Kerosene," another contestant on the show. They stayed in the house for a few more weeks as this new duo. Finally, Ivana was eliminated in the fifth week against Ana María Aldón.

== Supervivientes ==
Ivana is a contestant from Supervivientes: Perdidos en Honduras (2020) and Supervivientes: All Stars (2026).

=== Supervivientes 2020 ===
In 2020 she participated in Supervivientes: Perdidos en Honduras (2020) for almost three months, becoming one of the standout contestants of the season. She stayed on the island for about 85 days, until mid-May 2020.

She won the leader challenge several times, which gave her immunity and visibility. She had a romance with Hugo Sierra, which was closely followed by the Spanish press. Hugo is Adara Molinero's ex-boyfriend and father of her son, and Elena Rodriguez, another contestant, is Adara's mother.

Elena constantly questioned Ivana, hinting that her connection with Hugo was a strategy and defending her daughter, Adara. Arguments between Ivana and Elena were frequent, with accusations about the authenticity of the romance and Ivana's behavior in the house.

She was the tenth to be eliminated, in a duel against Jorge Pérez, and left with a lot of emotion and the audience's recognition. Although she was relatively unknown in Spain, her time on Supervivientes turned her into a media figure, gaining thousands of followers on social media.

=== Supervivientes: All Stars ===
In 2026 Ivana was confirmed in September 2026 as an official contestant of Supervivientes All Stars 3, which brings together notable figures from previous editions.

She returns six years after her stint on Supervivientes, but she emphasized that this time her goal is to fight for victory, not just for media exposure.

She is currently competing.

== Others projects ==
In 2016, after Gran Hermano Argentina (season 9), agrees to participate in El Debate: La Revancha, where some of the former participants faced off again, but this time outside the house. Ivana managed to get her revenge and beat Yasmila in the final with 51.19% against 48.80%, thus winning the reality show and the prize of a brand new car.

In 2021, she arrives on the Spanish platform mtmad with 'Dulce Ivana', her own channel where she shows all the updates about her pregnancy and her new life as a future mom.

She has published one book with her mother, Analía Rivero, titled Viaje de amor y soledad.

== Personal life ==
In 2016, after leaving Gran Hermano Argentina (season 9), Ivana and Luifa they confirmed their relationship. Luifa even got Ivana's name tattooed on his arm as a sign of love. They lived together in Italy for over a year while Luifa tried to relaunch his soccer career. In 2019, Ivana's participation in Grande Fratello marked the definitive breakup. Luifa said he lost respect for her after what happened on that show, where Ivana got involved with Gianmarco Onestini. The relationship ended in conflict and with public reproaches in 2019.

In 2020, Ivana started a relationship with the Uruguayan Hugo Sierra on Supervivientes: Perdidos en Honduras (2020) and after leaving the show, they stayed together and made their relationship official in the Spanish media. They settled in Palma de Mallorca and in 2021 they had a daughter, Giorgia.

Over time in 2022, Ivana and Hugo started showing differences and broke up, with statements exchanged in the media. Hugo said the relationship was worn out, while Ivana said she didn't feel supported.

In 2024, Ivana started a relationship with Mario Ramirez, aka Finito, on the reality show "Gran Hermano Dúo 2" and it became official with a kiss on the set. Despite the challenges of a long-distance relationship, like geographical distance and media pressure, Ivana and Finito have shown that their love is still alive. However, after almost a year together, Ivana has confirmed her breakup with Finito, leaving her fans with many questions about the future of their relationship.

== Filmography ==
=== Televisión ===
Year	Title	Role	Notes
2016	(Argentina) Gran Hermano 2016	Contestant	Runner-up
2016	(Argentina) El Debate: La Revancha	Contestant	Winner
2019	(Italy) Grande Fratello 16	Contestant	16th place
2020	(Spain) Supervivientes 2020	Contestant	7th place
2020	(Spain) La Casa Fuerte	Commentator	
2024	(Spain) Gran Hermano Dúo 2	Contestant	9th place
2026	(Spain) Supervivientes: All Stars 3	Contestant	7th place

=== Web ===
Year	Title	Role	Notes
2021–2023	(Spain) Dulce Ivana	Host	
