= Gran Hermano (Argentine TV series) season 9 =

Gran Hermano
- Season 9
- Presented by: Jorge Rial
- No. of days: 99
- No. of housemates: 24
- Winner: Luis Fabián "Luifa" Galesio
- Runner-up: Ivana Icardi

Release
- Original network: América TV
- Original release: 18 May – 24 August 2016

Season chronology
- ← Previous; Season 8 Next → Season 10

Gran Hermano 2016 is the ninth season of the Argentinian version of the reality show Gran Hermano. This season was confirmed as part of a multi-season deal subscribed between América TV and Endemol Argentina when the network took over the rights. The premiere of this season was originally set to debut in March 2016, confirmed by Jorge Rial during the Gran Hermano 2015 finale on 30 September 2015. This season began on 18 May 2016.

After the previous season started to provide peaks of up to 12 points for América TV in the primetime ratings, the network quickly decided to extend the agreement and this new season has been rumored to come since July, but it wasn't until September 2015 when it was technically confirmed just awaiting the network's major call for open castings. Castings opened officially on 1 October 2015.

As the show's house would be used for Big Brother Panamá just days after this season's conclusion, and also, after this season suffered a decrease in ratings and advertising revenue compared to the previous one, it has been confirmed that this season would end on 24 August 2016, lasting 99 days and becoming the shortest season ever produced in the country. An additional season was expected but after several considerations, América TV did not produce a new season. However, the day after this season finale, Debate host Pamela David announced in her morning talk show Desayuno Americano that "next year the Celebrity season is coming up", referencing a potential Celebrity season exactly 10 years after the first one ever aired in the country. Also, days before the season came to its end, host Jorge Rial announced that this season would actually be his last.

Luis Fabián "Luifa" Galesio was crowned the winner on 24 August 2016 after surviving 92 days in the house of the 99 that season lasted. Ivana Icardi became the runner-up. Third place went to Mauricio Guirao, while fourth went to Leandro Robin and fifth place went to Yasmila Anna Mendeguía. This season is being called the most "fixed" in the show's history in the country, and there was a possibility of the second celebrity season in 2017. Luifa won with 60,1% of all votes against Ivana in a final match, and he will receive this season's cash prize together with a brand new house. As this season's runner-up, Ivana landed a gig as a panelist in one of América TV's talk shows most likely joining Jorge Rial's Intrusos. Mauricio, who finished third received a brand new car and a house for his whole family.

== Season overplay ==
On Launch Night, host Jorge Rial revealed that all housemates that moved in on Day 1 (18 May 2016) were not definitive contestants for the series, and the audience would decide who the final contestants would be. The twist was revealed during the debut gala of this series. According to what the host said, this how the mechanism will work to select the final set of contestants: the public will choose one male and one female housemate to become "The Protgées", then one housemate will be sent home by Gran Hermano and the other one by host Jorge Rial, more details will be revealed during the course of the first week of the housemates in the house.

On Day 8 (25 May 2016), it was announced that a Triple Eviction would take place: Two evictees by Gran Hermano and one by host Jorge Rial. Before the evictions happened, Azul & Mauricio were announced as the two most voted contestants by the public, therefore becoming "The Protegées". Mariano was the first housemate evicted, chosen by Gran Hermano, the main reason behind his eviction was because he was not feeling comfortable inside the house with the rest of his fellow castmates. Carolina soon followed and was also chosen by Gran Hermano to be evicted on Day 8. After this violent behavior during the first week, Jorge decided to evict Lucas, and he became the third housemate evicted on Day 8.

On Day 22 (8 June 2016), Macarena decides to quit the game. In the following days an open vote between the previously evicted females from this series (Carolina & Yasmila) together with several contenders from Gran Hermano 2015 (Belén, Florencia, María Paz, Marian & Valeria) was made. On Day 29 (15 June 2016), the most voted from each group would enter the game to compete to become Macarena's replacement, the ones who entered were Yasmila & Marian. However, on Day 32 (18 June 2016), during the evening, in a way of a prank mixed with some yelling that happened earlier that day, Marian together and motivated by Dante briefly escaped the house through the backyard. On Day 36 (22 June 2016), a decision on their case was made, with host Jorge Rial announcing the results inside the house together with all housemates remaining. They were ultimately ejected for trespassing the rules and breaking the isolation the way they did. Because of producers extending the announcement of their decision, the vote-to-evict that began on Day 29 was extended through Day 43 (29 June 2016).

Azul decided to quit the game during the evening of Day 38 (24 June 2016), however, her exit was confirmed hours later. The reason behind her decision was an argument between Ivana and the rest of the remaining male housemates occurred that night, because of its intensity, it became Azul's tipping point and convinced her to quit the game, as confirmed the following day by Rial. The next day, Rial in a Periscope chat with his followers, explained that indeed, Azul left the house unnoticed and Azul, she received immediate attentions by producers and the show's psychologists. He also stated that Azul was fed up with all the arguments and fights that happened so far into the season and she could not take them any longer. In the following live show, on Day 43 (29 June 2016), Azul re-entered the House to explain herself to her fellow housemates exactly what led her to leave, as mentioned previously, on that evening - Day 38 - because of the intense fight that occurred while the majority of the housemates were having dinner, the yelling and intensity of that argument became unbearable for her, and that's why she walked all the way to the backyard, and just as Dante & Marian did the previous week, she climbed the wall and jumped outside the house.

On Day 50 (6 July 2016), 4 new potential housemates entered the house: Ainelén, Antonella R., Bárbara & Valentina, and their mission was to be themselves and impress the show's producers and Gran Hermano so they could stay and become the new official housemates. After one week inside, Ainelén & Bárbara became the new housemates, and the other 2 candidates left the house that very same night.

During Week 11, a special repechage vote was announced and was between several of this season's evicted housemates. The housemates up for public vote in this special voting round were: Agustín, Antonella P., Belén, Luifa, Julieta, Macarena & Matías S., the public was given just a few hours to cast their votes, Luifa became the lucky housemate to return to the game, and he received 70,6% of all votes cast. This special vote left many fans disappointed as they didn't expect it to happen and the outcome made the whole ordeal even worst, as many expressed on social media that it was set so Luifa (who was evicted just the week before) was given an undeserved second chance. Also, one of the most shocking details of this repechage was that twin sisters Antonella & Julieta Pozzi, who played the game as a single entity, were split for this repechage.

== Housemates ==
A total of 19 housemates entered on Day 1 (18 May 2016). It was clarified during the Launch show, that sisters Antonella & Julieta Pozzi will play as a single housemate. Several of the housemates are linked to local celebrities, either because they're relatives (like Ivana, her brother is a soccer star & Matías S., his brother is a famous tennis player) or they dated them (like Lucas; who dated a widely known journalist & Macarena, who has dated high profiled men). Also, both Luis Fabián "Luifa" Galesio and Cynthia Aller were relatively known prior to enter Gran Hermano.

Marian García was a housemate on Gran Hermano 2015 and entered in this series as one of the two replacements (the other one was this season's Yasmila) chosen by the public for Macarena who quit on Day 22. On Day 57, Ainelén & Bárbara were announced as official housemates by Gran Hermano, after they survived 1 week in the House as their final tryout to become the new housemates.

| Name | Age | Occupation | Resident | Day entered | Day exited | Status |
|---|---|---|---|---|---|---|
| Luis Fabián "Luifa" Galesio | 22 | Soccer player | Córdoba, CO | 78 | 99 | Winner |
| Luis Fabián "Luifa" Galesio | 22 | Soccer player | Córdoba, CO | 1 | 71 | Evicted |
| Ivana Icardi | 20 | Student | Rosario, SF | 1 | 99 | Runner-up |
| Mauricio Guirao | 23 | Builder | Santa Fe, SF | 1 | 99 | Third Place |
| Leandro Robin | 29 | Singer | Tucumán, TU | 1 | 99 | Fourth Place |
| Yasmila Anna Mendeguía | 19 | Promoter | Mar del Plata, BA | 29 | 99 | Fifth Place |
| Yasmila Anna Mendeguía | 19 | Promoter | Mar del Plata, BA | 1 | 22 | Evicted |
| Patricio Sills | 21 | Student | San Antonio de Areco, BA | 1 | 92 | Evicted |
| Gabriel Di Tocco | 20 | Carpenter/Student | Burzaco, BA | 1 | 92 | Evicted |
| Ainelén Thevenon | 28 | Dentist | Río Gallegos, SC | 50 | 85 | Evicted |
| Matías Portillo | 21 | Student | Corrientes, CT | 1 | 85 | Evicted |
| Bárbara Kolm | 22 | Unemployed | Buenos Aires, BA | 50 | 78 | Evicted |
| Matías Schwartzman | 28 | Singer | San Telmo, CF | 1 | 64 | Evicted |
| Agustín Pappa | 19 | Student/sportsman | Flores, CF | 1 | 57 | Evicted |
| Azul Carrizo | 31 | Singer | San Fernando del Valle, CA | 43 | 43 | Ejected |
| Azul Carrizo | 31 | Singer | San Fernando del Valle, CA | 1 | 38 | Walked |
| María "Belén" Cavanay D'Alessandro | 21 | Flight attendant | Colegiales, CF | 1 | 43 | Evicted |
| Dante Sendyk | 27 | Exhibitionist | Cipolletti, RN | 1 | 36 | Ejected |
| Marian García Farjat | 22 | Student/Gran Hermano 2015 housemate | Escobar, BA | 29 | 36 | Ejected |
| Antonella Pozzi | 20 | Psychology student | General Roca, RN | 1 | 29 | Evicted |
| Julieta Pozzi | 20 | Economic Sciences Student | General Roca, RN | 1 | 29 | Evicted |
| Macarena Pérez | 24 | Model | Villa del Parque, CF | 1 | 22 | Walked |
| Cynthia Aller | 27 | Promoter | Loma Hermosa, BA | 1 | 15 | Evicted |

Future appearances
In 2016, all contestants (with the exception of Pérez, García Farjat, Carrizo and Kolm) participate in El Debate: La Revancha. Gallesio has the role of jury while Ivana Icardi is crowned the winner.

In 2019, Icardi participate in Grande Fratello (season 16), where she is the 4th evicted. In 2020, participe in Supervivientes: Perdidos en Honduras (2020), where she is the 10th eliminated.

In 2024, Yasmila Mendeguia is join cast of La Venganza de los Ex VIP (season 3) has the role of Ex in last seven episodes. Icardi participate in Gran Hermano Dúo 2, where she is the 5th evicted. Matías Portillo is part of cast of La Isla de las Tentaciones: Argentina & Chile in role of bachelor.

== Final casting progress ==
| Name | Age | Occupation | Hometown | Status | Result |
|---|---|---|---|---|---|
| Azul Carrizo | 31 | Singer | San Fernando del Valle, CA | Official Housemate | 18.55% |
| Mauricio Guirao | 23 | Builder | Santa Fe, SF | Official Housemate | 15.45% |
| Lucas Tisera | 35 | Unemployed | Santa Fe, SF | Evicted | Jorge Rial's choice |
| Carolina Ceballos | 25 | Model | Arequito, SF | Evicted | Gran Hermano's choice |
| Mariano Mattera | 23 | Truck driver | La Plata, BA | Evicted | Gran Hermano's choice |

== Repechage & New casting progress ==
=== Repechage 1 ===
From Gran Hermano 2015 & Gran Hermano 2016
Two females will re-enter the House. One from Gran Hermano 2015, and one from Gran Hermano 2016. They will enter the house for a week. At the end, the winner will become an official housemate. After Marian's ejection on Day 36 (22 June 2016), Yasmila automatically became the replacement.

| Ex-housemate | Age | Occupation | Percentage | Status | Result |
|---|---|---|---|---|---|
| Yasmila Anna Mendeguía; From Gran Hermano 2016 | 19 | Promoter | 23.9% | Re-entered; Day 29 | Official housemate Day 36 |
| Marian García Farjat; From Gran Hermano 2015 | 22 | Student/Hockey player | 29.4% | Re-entered; Day 29 | Ejected; Day 36 |
| María Paz Delgado; From Gran Hermano 2015 | 30 | Model | 24.2% | | |
| Carolina Ceballos; From Gran Hermano 2016 | 27 | Model | 10.34% | | |
| Belén Etchart; From Gran Hermano 2015 | 24 | Model | 6.35% | | |
| Florencia Zaccanti; From Gran Hermano 2015 | 26 | Model/Promoter | 3.40% | | |
| Valeria Licciardi; From Gran Hermano 2015 | 31 | Moza/Social Worker | 1.8% | | |

=== Repechage 2 ===
| Ex-housemate | Percentage | Result |
|---|---|---|
| Luis Fabián "Luifa" Galesio | 70.6% | Re-entered; Day 78 |
| Belén Cavanay D’Alessandro | 14.6% | |
| Antonella Pozzi | 5.9% | |
| Macarena Pérez | 5% | |
| Agustín Pappa | 2.3% | |
| Matías Schwartzman | 0.8% | |
| Julieta Pozzi | 0.8% | |

=== New casting progress ===
Due to ejections of Marian, Dante and Azul. Gran Hermano decided to start a new casting progress. On Day 50, four female candidates entered the house. They will stay in the house for a week. Gran Hermano will decide which two become official housemates.

| Contestant | Age | Occupation | Hometown | Result |
|---|---|---|---|---|
| Ainelén Thevenon | 28 | Dentist/Actress | Río Gallegos, Santa Cruz | Official housemate Day 57 |
| Bárbara Kolm | 22 | Unemployed | Buenos Aires, BA | Official housemate Day 57 |
| Antonella Rosseti | 23 | Student/Model | Buenos Aires, BA | Evicted; Day 57 |
| Valentina Ramella | 18 | Student | Adrogué, BA | Evicted; Day 57 |

== Nominations table ==
| | Week 1 | | Week 2 | Week 3 | Week 4 | Week 5 | Week 6 | Week 8 | Week 9 | Week 10 | Week 11 | Week 12 | Week 13 | Week 14 Final | | Nominations received |
| | Day 1 | Day 8 | Week 2 | Week 3 | Week 4 | Week 5 | Week 6 | Week 8 | Week 9 | Week 10 | Week 11 | Week 12 | Week 13 | Week 14 Final | | Nominations received |
|---|---|---|---|---|---|---|---|---|---|---|---|---|---|---|---|---|
| Luifa | Non- Housemate | | Macarena, Patricio | Patricio, A.& J. | A.& J., Belén | Agustín | No nominations | Matías S., Agustín | Yasmila, Gabriel | Ainelen, Barbara | Evicted (Day 71) | Exempt | Patricio, Yasmila | Winner (Day 99) | | 38 |
| Ivana | Non- Housemate | | Macarena, Belén | Macarena, Yasmila | Luifa, Agustín | Matías P., Luifa | No nominations | Agustín, Leandro | Matías S., Luifa | Luifa, Patricio | Ainelén; Mauricio, Yasmila | Mauricio, Yasmila | Mauricio, Yasmila | Runner-up (Day 99) | | 6 |
| Mauricio | Non- Housemate | Housemate | Belén, Luifa | Patricio, A.& J. | Patricio, A.& J. | Belén, Matías P. | No nominations | Luifa, Matías P. | Yasmila, Barbára | Ainelen, Barbara | Bárbara, Ivana | Yasmila, Gabriel | Patricio, Yasmila | Third place (Day 99) | | 12 |
| Leandro | Non- Housemate | | Matías S., Agustín | Yasmila, Matias S. | Matías S. | Matías S., Luifa | No nominations | Agustín, Patricio | Matías S., Luifa | Luifa, Patricio | Bárbara, Mauricio | Yasmila, Mauricio | Yasmila, Mauricio | Fourth place (Day 99) | | 5 |
| Yasmila | Non- Housemate | | Ivana, Patricio | Patricio, A.& J. | Evicted (Day 22) | Exempt | No nominations | No nominations | Patricio | Luifa, Patricio | Gabriel, Mauricio | Matías P., Gabriel | Mauricio, Gabriel | Fifth place (Day 99) | | 26 |
| Patricio | Non- Housemate | | Luifa, Cynthia | Yasmila, Luifa | Luifa, Agustín | Luifa, Matías S. | No nominations | Agustín, Matías S. | Matías S., Matías P. | Leandro | Mauricio, Bárbara | Mauricio, Leandro | Mauricio, Gabriel | Evicted (Day 92) | | 24 |
| Gabriel | Non- Housemate | | Macarena, Cynthia | Luifa, Matias S. | Luifa, Agustín | Luifa, Mauricio | No nominations | Yasmila | Matías S., Leandro | Luifa, Patricio | Ainelén; Yasmila, Bárbara | Yasmila, Patricio | Yasmila, Mauricio | Evicted (Day 92) | | 9 |
| Ainelén | Not in House | | | | | | | Non- Housemate | Yasmila, Mauricio | Luifa, Patricio | Gabriel, Bárbara | Yasmila, Matías P. | Evicted (Day 85) | | | 1 |
| Matías P. | Non- Housemate | | Yasmila, Cynthia | Luifa, Yasmila | Luifa, Agustín | Matías S., Belén | No nominations | Agustín, Leandro | Leandro, Luifa | Patricio, Luifa | Mauricio, Bárbara | Yasmila, Mauricio | Evicted (Day 85) | | | 6 |
| Bárbara | Not in House | | | | | | | Non- Housemate | Luifa, Ainelén | Luifa, Patricio | Mauricio, Patricio | Evicted (Day 78) | | | | 10 |
| Matías S. | Non- Housemate | | Macarena, Patricio | Patricio, A.& J. | A.& J., Patricio | Belén, Matías P. | No nominations | Agustín, Ivana | Yasmila, Bárbara | Evicted (Day 64) | | | | | | 26 |
| Agustín | Non- Housemate | | Patricio, Gabriel | Dante; ~~Luifa,~~; ~~Patricio~~ | A.& J., Belén | Belén, Mauricio | No nominations | Matías S., Gabriel | Evicted (Day 57) | | | | | | | 22 |
| Antonella R. | Not in House | | | | | | | Non- Housemate | Evicted (Day 57) | | | | | | | N/A |
| Valentina | Not in House | | | | | | | Non- Housemate | Evicted (Day 57) | | | | | | | N/A |
| Azul | Non- Housemate | Housemate | Dante, Leandro | Patricio, A.& J. | A.& J., Belén | Gabriel, Matías P. | No nominations | Ejected (Day 43) | | | | | | | | 0 |
| Belén | Non- Housemate | | Cynthia, Agustín | Yasmila, Matias S. | Luifa, Agustín | Luifa, Matias S. | No nominations | Evicted (Day 43) | | | | | | | | 15 |
| Dante | Non- Housemate | | Belén, Cynthia | Luifa, Yasmila | Luifa, Agustín | Luifa, Matías S. | Ejected (Day 36) | | | | | | | | | 5 |
| Marian | Not in House | | | | | Exempt | Ejected (Day 36) | | | | | | | | | N/A |
| Antonella P. & Julieta | Non- Housemate | | Cynthia, Yasmila | Yasmila, Macarena | Agustín, Luifa | Evicted (Day 29) | | | | | | | | | | 16 |
| Macarena | Non- Housemate | | Ivana, Patricio | Patricio, A.& J. | Walked (Day 22) | | | | | | | | | | | 11 |
| Cynthia | Non- Housemate | | Dante, A.& J. | Evicted (Day 15) | | | | | | | | | | | | 8 |
| Lucas | Non- Housemate | | Evicted (Day 8) | | | | | | | | | | | | | N/A |
| Carolina | Non- Housemate | | Evicted (Day 8) | | | | | | | | | | | | | N/A |
| Mariano | Non- Housemate | | Evicted (Day 8) | | | | | | | | | | | | | N/A |
| Notes | 1 | | none | 2, 3, 4, 5 | 6 | 7, 8, 9, 10 | 10, 11 | 12, 13, 14 | 15, 16 | 17, 18, 19 | 20 | 21 | 22, 23, 24 | 25 | | |
| Up for eviction | none | | Cynthia, Macarena | Agustín, Belén, Dante, Ivana, Matías P., Patricio, Yasmila | Antonella P. & Julieta, Luifa, Matias S. | Agustín, Azul, Belén, Ivana, Luifa, Matías S. | Belén, Ivana, Matías S. | Agustin, Luifa, Matias P., Matias S., Yasmila | Leandro, Luifa, Matías S., Patricio, Yasmila | Ainelén, Bárbara, Gabriel, Ivana, Leandro, Luifa, Matías P., Mauricio, Yasmila | Ainelén, Bárbara, Mauricio | Ainelén, Matías P., Mauricio, Yasmila | Gabriel, Luifa, Mauricio, Patricio, Yasmila | Ivana, Leandro, Luifa, Mauricio, Yasmila | | |
| Walked | none | | | Macarena | none | | Azul | none | | | | | | | | |
| Ejected | none | | | | | Dante, Marian | Azul | none | | | | | | | | |
| Evicted | Azul; 18.55% to be a housemate | Mariano; Gran Hermano's choice to evict | Cynthia; 51.3% to evict | Yasmila; 52.7% (out of 2) to evict | Yasmila; 23.9% to enter | Eviction postponed | Belén; 50.5% to evict | Antonella R. Gran Hermano's choice to evict | Matías S. 50.9% (out of 2) to evict | Luifa; 51.9% (out of 2) to evict | Bárbara; 48.7% to evict | Matías P. 46.8% to evict | Gabriel; 6.54% (out of 5) to save | Yasmila; 7.05% (out of 5) to win | Leandro; 13% (out of 4) to win | |
| Evicted | Azul; 18.55% to be a housemate | Carolina; Gran Hermano's choice to evict | Cynthia; 51.3% to evict | Yasmila; 52.7% (out of 2) to evict | Marian; 29.4% to enter | Eviction postponed | Belén; 50.5% to evict | Valentina; Gran Hermano's choice to evict | Matías S. 50.9% (out of 2) to evict | Luifa; 51.9% (out of 2) to evict | Bárbara; 48.7% to evict | Matías P. 46.8% to evict | Gabriel; 6.54% (out of 5) to save | Yasmila; 7.05% (out of 5) to win | Leandro; 13% (out of 4) to win | |
| Evicted | Mauricio; 15.45% to be a housemate | Carolina; Gran Hermano's choice to evict | Cynthia; 51.3% to evict | Yasmila; 52.7% (out of 2) to evict | Marian; 29.4% to enter | Eviction postponed | Belén; 50.5% to evict | Valentina; Gran Hermano's choice to evict | Matías S. 50.9% (out of 2) to evict | Luifa; 51.9% (out of 2) to evict | Luifa; 70.6% to re-enter | Ainelén; 33.3% to evict | Patricio; 49.42% (out of 2) to save | Mauricio; 18.13% (out of 3) to win | Ivana; 39.849% (out of 2) to win | |
| Evicted | Mauricio; 15.45% to be a housemate | Lucas; Jorge Rial's choice to evict | Cynthia; 51.3% to evict | Yasmila; 52.7% (out of 2) to evict | Antonella P. & Julieta; 62% (out of 2) to evict | Eviction postponed | Belén; 50.5% to evict | Agustin; 53.48% (out of 2) to evict | Matías S. 50.9% (out of 2) to evict | Luifa; 51.9% (out of 2) to evict | Luifa; 70.6% to re-enter | Ainelén; 33.3% to evict | Patricio; 49.42% (out of 2) to save | Mauricio; 18.13% (out of 3) to win | Ivana; 39.849% (out of 2) to win | |
| Survived | none | | Macarena; 48.7% | Belén; 47.3% Patricio ?% Agustin ?% Dante ?% Ivana ?% Matias P. ?% | Luifa; 38% Matías S. ?% | Luifa; 11.27% Azul; 4.7% Agustín; 4.25% | Ivana ?% Matías S. ?% | Matías S. ?%, Luifa ?%, Yasmila ?%, Matías P. ?% | Yasmila; 49.1% Patricio ?%, Leandro ?%, Luifa ?% | Matías P. 3.35% (out of 9); Mauricio; 1.8% (out of 9); Bárbara; 1.27% (out of 9); Gabriel; 1.16% (out of 9); Leondro; 0.55% (out of 9); Ivana; 18.8% (out of 4); Ainelén; 13.5% (out of 4); Yasmila; 48.1% (out of 2) | Mauricio; 33.1% Ainelén; 18.2% | Yasmila; 15.4% Mauricio; 4.5% | Luifa; 39.52% (out of 5); Yasmila; 49.58% (out of 3); Mauricio; 50.58% (out of 2) | Luifa; 60.151% to win | | |

=== Notes ===
- ^1: On Day 8, it was announced that a triple eviction would take place: Two evictees by Gran Hermano and one by host Jorge Rial. Before the evictions happened, Azul & Mauricio were announced as the two most voted contestants by the public, therefore becoming "The Protegées". Mariano was the first housemate evicted, chosen by Gran Hermano, the main reason behind his eviction was because he was not feeling comfortable inside the house with the rest of his fellow housemates. Carolina soon followed and was also chosen by Gran Hermano to be evicted on Day 8. After this violent behavior during the first week, Jorge Rial decided to evict Lucas, and he became the third housemate evicted on Day 8.
- ^2: Agustin, Ivana and Matias P. are automatically up for eviction as punishment.
- ^3: Agustin pressed the Red Button, he had the fulminated nomination and automatically nominated Dante.
- ^4: Gabriel entered The Attic and he had to pick two housemates to join him to pop balloons. Agustin popped his balloon and got an Immunity, but it was nullified because he was punished. Belen popped her balloon and she was automatically nominated.
- ^5: Dante entered The Attic and he had the power to save a housemate from eviction, he chose Patricio.
- ^6: Leandro pressed the Red Button, he had the fulminated nomination and automatically nominated Matias S..
- ^7: Luifa pressed the Red Button, he had the fulminated nomination and automatically nominated Agustín.
- ^8: Gabriel entered The Attic and he must give two housemates gifts. He chose Azul & Patricio. Patricio's gift: He is the king of the week, and immune from eviction. Azul's gift: She had to choose a housemate, she chose Ivana. They open the box and find out they are automatically up for eviction.
- ^9: On Day 32, during the evening, in a way of a prank mixed with some shouting that happened earlier that day, Marian together and motivated by Dante briefly escaped the house through the backyard. On Day 36, a decision on their case was made, with host Jorge Rial announcing the results inside the house together with all housemates remaining. They were ultimately ejected for trespassing the rules and breaking the isolation the way they did.
- ^10: Because of producers extending the announcement of their decision, the vote-to-evict that began on Day 29 was extended through Day 43.
- ^11: On Day 43, Azul re-entered the house to explain why she left, but she was "ejected" by producers later that night.
- ^12: During the Gala show on Day 43, Gabriel pressed the Red Button, he had the fulminated nomination and automatically nominated Yasmila. But nomination was not held due to time constraints.
- ^13: Luifa entered The Attic, there are two envelopes. The first one for him, he must give the second one to one housemate, he chose Mauricio. Which means Mauricio is now immune. And Mauricio must nominate two people for eviction, he nominated Luifa and Matias P..
- ^14: As part of the new casting progress, Ainelén, Antonella, Bárbara and Valentina entered the house for a week. Gran Hermano will decide which two become official housemates. They are not official housemates, so they can't nominate and be nominated.
- ^15: Yasmila pressed the Red Button, he had the fulminated nomination and automatically nominated Patricio.
- ^16: Gabriel entered The Attic, there are two envelopes. He read the first one then gives the second one to Matias P. Matias P. read the envelope and found out he can directly nominate two housemates for eviction. He chose Leandro and Luifa.
- ^17: Ivana entered The Attic, she chose Mauricio from the other group to start a negotiation. They must nominate a housemate and give another housemate an immunity in five minutes. If they didn't decide in five minutes, they will both automatically nominated for eviction️ this week. They failed, so they both automatically nominated for eviction.
- ^18: Patricio pressed the Red Button, he had the fulminated nomination and automatically nominated Leandro.
- ^19: As punishment for complot during nomination progress, all housemates except Patricio are automatically nominated for eviction.
- ^20: Gabriel entered The Attic, he chose Ivana from the other group to start a negotiation. They chose to nominate Ainelen and gave Matías P. an immunity.
- ^21: Matías P. entered The Attic, and start a negotiation with Luifa. They must nominate a housemate and give another housemate an immunity in five minutes. If they didn't decide in five minutes, they will both automatically nominated for eviction️ this week. They chose to nominate Ainelén and gave Ivana an immunity.
- ^22: Matías P. entered The Attic, and found out he is nominated for eviction.
- ^23: Ivana entered The Attic, and start a negotiation with Leandro. They need to choose a housemate to become first finalist. Leandro chose Ivana and she accepted, that means Ivana is the 1st Finalist.
- ^24: Leandro became the second finalist.
- ^25: For the final week, the public were voting for the housemate they wanted to win, rather than evict.
