= Gran Hermano (Argentine TV series) season 8 =

Season of television series

Gran Hermano
- Season 8
- No. of days: 155
- No. of housemates: 20
- Winner: Francisco
- Runner-up: Matías

Season chronology
- ← Previous; Season 7 Next → Season 9

Gran Hermano 2015 is the eighth season of the Argentinian version of the reality show Gran Hermano. This season was confirmed in December 2014 by the main executive of the network Liliana Parodi. It was the first season to be broadcast on América TV after being previously in Telefe. The premiere was set for Wednesday 29 April 2015, being delayed one week from its original debut date. This season will come three years after the end of the most recent one. This season finished on 30 September 2015, after 155 days, becoming the second longest season ever produced in the country after the seventh season.

Jorge Rial announced that he would return to the show's main hosting duties, after leaving the position halfway during the previous season due to personal issues. Pamela David, one of America's main personalities, took over on hosting the show's Debates and Daily Highlights.

== Production ==
=== The House ===
With the network change, Endemol now has a major role in the show's production, and now the house will be at Endemol's Estudios Mayor, which are located in the Buenos Aires neighborhood of Palermo, in a specific area known as "Palermo Hollywood". The architectural design of the house is work of Alberto Negrin. The studio where the house is located was used previously by El Trece for a show called La Casa de los Artistas which was broadcast in 2013.

=== Casting ===
Reportedly, over 30,000 people auditioned on the open casting calls made by producers between January and February 2015. By March 2015, host Jorge Rial mentioned during his show Intrusos about some of those who showed up in these audition calls, those named include: Gran Hermano Spain 10 finalist Almudena Martinez; former "Los Wachiturros" member Emanuel Ghidone; former gang leader Tamara Blanco, known as "The Cheta"; Tomas Loyola aka "Tomasito Suller" who previously participated in GH 2012; former cumbia group "Volcano" lead singer Roberto Edgar; Cristian, who is son of former Gran Hermano 2007 and Gran Hermano Famosos contestant Diego Leonardi.

== Housemates ==
Name	Age	Occupation	Resident	Day entered	Day exited	Status
Francisco Delgado	29	Model	Río Negro, RN	120	155	Winner
Francisco Delgado	29	Model	Río Negro, RN	1	113	Walked
Matías Schrank	19	Student	Misiones, MI	45	155	Runner-up
Matías Schrank	19	Student	Misiones, MI	1	43	3rd evicted
Belén Etchart	22	Model	Buenos Aires	1	155	Third Place
Mariano Verón	30	Entrepreneur	Córdoba, CO	93	155	Fourth Place
Mariano Verón	30	Entrepreneur	Córdoba, CO	1	85	Walked
Eloy Lanzelotta	23	Production operator	La Matanza, BA	120	148	13th evicted
Eloy Lanzelotta	23	Production operator	La Matanza, BA	113 •	Official Housemate	
Marian Farjat	20	Student	Buenos Aires	1	148	12th evicted
Camila Cortese	27	Store manager	Ramos Mejía, BA	120	130	Walked
Camila Cortese	27	Store manager	Ramos Mejía, BA	1	29	2nd evicted
Florencia Zaccanti	26	Model	Villa Carlos Paz, CO	93	127	11th evicted
Romina Malaspina	20	Model	Mar del Plata, BA	1	113	10th evicted
Nicolás Conte	26	Boxer	Santiago del Estero, SE	1	108	Walked
Fernando Parada	35	Engineer	Ramos Mejía, BA	1	101	9th evicted
Brian Lanzelotta	25	Cumbia singer	La Matanza, BA	1	95	Ejected
(Paraguay) Ángela "Angie" Pereyra	21	Waitress	Villa 31, Retiro	50	85	8th evicted
María Paz Delgado	29	Model	Mar del Plata, BA	1	71	7th evicted
Eloy Rivera	20	Social media personality	Burzaco, BA	1	57	6th evicted
Valeria Licciardi	30	Waitress	Buenos Aires	1	57	5th evicted
Solano Cano	24	Fashion Designer	Catamarca, CA	1	43	4th evicted
Nadia Terazzolo	31	Single mom	Carlos Casares, BA	1	15	1st evicted
Candidate
Yasmín Farjat	27	Student	Buenos Aires	113 •	120	Not chosen

Future appearances

- In 2016, Garcia farjat participe in Gran Hermano (Argentine season 9), where she is ejected.
- In 2017, Malaspina participe in Doble tentación, un reality irresistible, where she is ejected.
- In 2018, Malaspina participe in Supervivientes: Perdidos en Honduras (2018), where she is the 6th evicted.
- In 2020, B. Lanzelotta participe in Cantando 2020, and was the runner-up.
- In 2021, Zaccanti participe in Jugando con Fuego: Latino.
- In 2023, Garcia Farjat participe in El Hotel De Los Famosos (season 2), where is 3rd evicted. Malaspina participe in Bailando 2023, where she is the 4th evicted.

=== Summary ===
- On 17 April 2015, Melanie Defederico was announced as a "housemate" by Jorge Rial in his show Intrusos, however, due to the exposure she got the days after the news were made official, she was dropped from the official shortlist and will be replaced by an auditionee.
- On the premiere, the 14 official housemates for this season were revealed, plus, an "enigmatic" 15th housemate (Francisco, who is in the middle of a paternity controversy between him, model Gisela Bernal and her husband Ariel Diwan, baby he says is not his. However, by early August 2015, it was confirmed that Francisco is the actual father of that baby, since a DNA test was done on Diwan and came back negative) and they are the ones listed below.
- On Day 36, during the 3rd round of nominations, after constant rule breaking, a Double Eviction was announced on that Gala (June 3, 2015). Now, on Day 43 (June 10, 2015), it was announced that the replacement revealed to go in during that night's show will be decided by the audience, three of the evicted housemates up to that point (Camila, Matias & Solano) plus two candidates from the open calls (Angela & Belen B.) will face off in a public vote to determine who will go in. That public vote will open on Day 44 (June 11, 2015), as during the 3rd Eviction gala was not possible due time constrains. The voting took place for about 24 hours, and on Day 45 (June 12, 2015), Matías Schrank, two days after being evicted with the most votes in the Double Eviction, was brought back in the game by the public with 36% of all votes cast.
- The remaining candidates in the "Comeback" vote (Angela, Belén B., Camila & Solano) were exposed to public vote after Matías' re-entrance. On Day 50 (June 17, 2015), Ángela was voted into the house by viewers, and also, it was announced that another double eviction (this time a definitive one) will take place on Day 57 (June 24, 2015).
- On Day 80 (July 17, 2015), Francisco left the house for a few hours to see the birth of his daughter Elena. Almost three weeks later, on Day 99 (August 5, 2015) he left the house temporarily again, as for not being married to the baby's mother, he had to attend a judicial precinct to formalize the registry of the child.
- After Angie's eviction on Day 85, it was announced that another "Comeback" vote will happen. This time it was divided by gender and two housemates were going to enter, for the men the candidates were Eloy & Mariano (who voluntarily left the house that same gala) while for the women were Angie, Maria Paz, Valeria & new candidate Florencia. On Day 93 (July 30, 2015), during a special scheduled live show due to the network's decision to avoid broadcasting the show against a big soccer match happening the day before, Mariano & Florencia entered the house as the respective winners of the vote and the rest of the housemates were automatically nominated for eviction due constant rule breaking and nomination plotting.
- Two days later, on Day 95 (August 1, 2015), Brian was ejected from the house after attacking love-interest Marian the night before inside the house's sauna during their weekly Friday night party. A special live show aired that same day, to let Brian know about the producers' decision, and social media went on blast regarding this situation.
- This series has faced during its run thus far, many incidents where people go to the precincts of the house's location and start shouting to the contestants remaining inside the house, because of these repeated situations, Nicolás decided to quit on Day 108 (August 14, 2015) as he overheard people from outside yelling "María Paz was with Mariano when he was outside" (or a phrase pretty much close to that), he also revealed during that night's Debate that the couldn't handle the pressure of living in the House and dealing with the game.
- • On Day 113 (August 19, 2015), 2 brand new housemates entered the house, and they had connections to the other housemates. They were Yazmín Farjat (Marian's sister) & Eloy Lancelotta (Brian's brother), Rial explained in the liveshow, that both Yazmín and Eloy will stay in the house for a full week, however the public will then decide if either one of them stays or if both will stay in the game. The public was given three choice in that special voting round: A-Save Eloy; B-Save Yazmín; C-Save both. On Day 120 (August 26, 2015) It was revealed that Eloy had the most votes and entered the game while Yazmín was evicted.

== Nominations table ==
The first name means two points and the second one, one point.

	Week 2	Week 4	Week 6	Week 7	Week 8	Week 10	Week 12	Week 13	Week 14	Week 16	Week 17	Week 18	Week 20	Week 21		Final Week 22		Nominations received
Francisco	Matías, Nadia	Camila, Solano	Solano, Belén	No nominations	Valeria, Belén	María Paz, Belén	Romina	No nominations	Brian, Matías	Marian, Nicolás	Walked (Day 113)	Exempt	Belén, Eloy L.	Saved	No nominations	Winner (Day 155)		22
Matías	~~Francisco,~~; ~~Fernando~~	María Paz, Camila	Brian	Evicted (Day 43)	Fernando, Romina	Fernando, Romina	Fernando, Francisco	No nominations	Belén	Romina, Nicolás	No nominations	Florencia, Marian	Mariano, Eloy L.	Saved	No nominations	Runner-up (Day 155)		42
Belén	Nadia, Eloy R.	Matías, Valeria	Francisco, Matias	No nominations	Romina, Francisco	Fernando, Romina	Fernando, Brian	No nominations	Fernando, Marian	Romina, Nicolás	No nominations	Mariano	Matías, Mariano	Saved	No nominations	Third Place (Day 155)		16
Mariano	Nadia, Valeria	Matías, Camila	Matías, Romina	No nominations	Romina, Eloy R.	Romina, Fernando	Marian, Nicolás	Walked (Day 85)	Exempt	Belén	No nominations	Florencia, Matías	Matías, Eloy L.	Nominated	No nominations	Fourth Place (Day 155)		3
Eloy L.	Not in House										Nominated	Belén, Marian	Mariano, Belén	Exempt	No nominations	Evicted (Day 148)		2
Marian	Nadia, Mariano	María Paz, Eloy R.	Matías, Francisco	No nominations	Romina, Eloy R.	Romina, Fernando	Angie, Matías	No nominations	Matías, Brian	Romina, Nicolás	No nominations	Florencia, Matías	Belén, Matías	Nominated	Evicted (Day 148)			12
Camila	Francisco, Romina	Francisco	Evicted (Day 29)									Exempt	Francisco	Walked (Day 130)				9
Florencia	Not in House								Exempt	Nicolás, Marian	No nominations	Belén, Marian	Evicted (Day 127)					7
Yasmín	Not in House										Nominated	Evicted (Day 120)						0
Romina	Francisco, Nadia	María Paz, Camila	Solano, Matias	No nominations	María Paz	María Paz, Mariano	Matías, Ángela	No nominations	Brian, Matías	Nicolás, Marian	Evicted (Day 113)							38
Nicolás	Eloy R., Nadia	Belén, Valeria	Matías, Marian	No nominations	Eloy R., Romina	Romina, Fernando	Angie, Matías	No nominations	Brian, Matías	Romina, Florencia	Walked (Day 108)							9
Fernando	Nadia, Romina	Matías, Camila	Matías, Solano	No nominations	Belén, Valeria	María Paz, Belén	Matías, Angie	No nominations	Brian, Matías	Evicted (Day 101)								30
Brian	~~Francisco,~~; ~~Valeria~~	Camila, María Paz	Solano, Matias	No nominations	Valeria, Belén	María Paz, Fernando	Angie, Matías	No nominations	Matías, Romina	Ejected (Day 95)								13
Angie	Not in House				Eloy R., Marian	Fernando, María Paz	Fernando, Mariano	Evicted (Day 85)										8
María Paz	Francisco, Nadia	Fernando, Eloy R.	Matías, Solano	No nominations	Romina, Fernando	Matías	Evicted (Day 71)											16
Eloy R.	Nadia, Matías	Matías, Camila	Matías, Solano	No nominations	Valeria, Romina	Evicted (Day 57)												16
Valeria	Nadia, Eloy R.	Fernando, Eloy R.	Romina, Fernando	No nominations	Eloy R., Fernando	Evicted (Day 57)												10
Solano	Francisco, Romina	Romina, Fernando	Francisco, Fernando	Evicted (Day 43)														10
Nadia	Francisco, Eloy R.	Evicted (Day 15)																16
Notes	1	2, 3	4, 5	6	7	8, 9, 10	11	12	13, 14, 15	16, 17, 18	19, 20	21	2, 22	23	none			
Up for eviction	Francisco; Nadia	Camila; Francisco; Matías; Mariano	Brian; Eloy R. Matías; Mariano; Solano; Valeria	Ángela; Belén B. Camila; Matías; Solano	Belén; Eloy R. Fernando; María Paz; Romina; Valeria	Angie; Brian; Fernando; Marian; María Paz; Matías	Angie; Matías; Romina	Eloy R. Mariano	Belén; ~~Brian~~; Fernando; Francisco; Marian; Matías; Nicolás; Romina	Belén; Francisco; Marian; Mariano; ~~Nicolás~~; Romina	Eloy L. Yasmín	Belén; Florencia; Mariano	Belén; Francisco; Marian; Mariano; Matías	Marian; Mariano	Belén; Eloy L. Francisco; Mariano; Matías	Belén; Francisco; Mariano; Matías		
Up for eviction	Francisco; Nadia	Camila; Francisco; Matías; Mariano	Brian; Eloy R. Matías; Mariano; Solano; Valeria	Ángela; Belén B. Camila; Matías; Solano	Belén; Eloy R. Fernando; María Paz; Romina; Valeria	Angie; Brian; Fernando; Marian; María Paz; Matías	Angie; Matías; Romina	Angie; Florencia; María Paz; Valeria	Belén; ~~Brian~~; Fernando; Francisco; Marian; Matías; Nicolás; Romina	Belén; Francisco; Marian; Mariano; ~~Nicolás~~; Romina	Angie; Camila; Eloy R. Francisco; Romina	Belén; Florencia; Mariano	Belén; Francisco; Marian; Mariano; Matías	Marian; Mariano	Belén; Eloy L. Francisco; Mariano; Matías	Belén; Francisco; Mariano; Matías		
Walked	none						Mariano	none		Nicolás; Francisco	none		Camila	none				
Ejected	none								Brian	none								
Evicted	Nadia; 53.98% to evict	Camila; 68.50% to evict (out of 2)	Matías; 30.37% to evict	Matías; 36.80% to enter (out of 5)	Valeria; 36.10% to evict (out of 3)	María Paz; 56.60% to evict (out of 3)	Angie; 47.60% to evict	Mariano; 35.20% to enter	Fernando; 54% to evict (out of 2)	Romina; 54.88% to evict (out of 2)	Eloy L. 48.20% to stay	Florencia; 53.80% to evict	No eviction	Marian; 58.20% to evict	Eloy L. 42.24% to evict	Mariano; 5.30% to win (out of 4)	Belén; 9.90% to win (out of 3)	
Evicted	Nadia; 53.98% to evict	Camila; 68.50% to evict (out of 2)	Solano; 23.57% to evict	Ángela; Most votes to enter (out of 4)	Eloy R. 33.90% to evict (out of 2)	María Paz; 56.60% to evict (out of 3)	Angie; 47.60% to evict	Florencia; 25.30% to enter	Fernando; 54% to evict (out of 2)	Romina; 54.88% to evict (out of 2)	Francisco; 47.60% Camila; 42% to enter	Florencia; 53.80% to evict	No eviction	Marian; 58.20% to evict	Eloy L. 42.24% to evict	Matías; 47.30% to win (out of 2)	Francisco; 52.70% to win (out of 2)	

=== Notes ===
- ^Note 1: Nicolás, Brian & Matías were under suspicion of forming a plot against Francisco. So, as Brian & Matías did vote for him, their votes were nulled.
- ^Note 2: Camila had the fulminated nomination and automatically nominated Francisco.
- ^Note 3: Mariano was automatically nominated as he entered the red room first.
- ^Note 4: Eloy quit the weekly task "The Servants" and because of that, those who were the servants with him (Mariano & Valeria) were all automatically nominated for eviction.
- ^Note 5: Matías used the fulminated nomination and automatically nominated Brian.
- ^Note 6: In Week 7 there was a repeschage round, also including potential housemates. For the running to (re-)enter the house were: Camila, Matías, Solano (as evicted housemates), Ángela and Belén B. (as potential housemates). On Day 45, Matías received the most votes with 36.8% and returned to the house on that same night. Lines were re-opened for the restant housemates. On Day 50, Ángela received the most votes and is officially a new housemate. Camila, Solano and Belén B. were then officially out of the game. Matías and Angie won immunity from the nominations for being new housemates.
- ^Note 7: Romina used the fulminated nomination and automatically nominated María Paz.
- ^Note 8: Angie was nominated for revealing too much information from the outside world on Day 55.
- ^Note 9: María Paz used the fulminated nomination and automatically nominated Matías.
- ^Note 10: Brian & Marian was automatically nominated by Gran Hermano (Big Brother) after bad behavior and verbal violence between each other.
- ^Note 11: Francisco used the fulminated nomination and automatically nominated Romina.
- ^Note 12: In Week 13, Big Brother decided to enter two participants to the house, a man and a woman. Among men were Mariano and Eloy R., and among women were Ángela, Maria Paz, Valeria and a new candidate called Florencia Zaccanti. In the 7th gala nomination results who were entering they occurred. On the women's side, I entered the house for the first time Florencia Zaccanti with 25.3% of the vote. And on the side of men, with 35.2% of the votes, he reentered the house Mariano.
- ^Note 13: Matías used the fulminated nomination and automatically nominated Belén.
- ^Note 14: Francisco was automatically nominated as he entered the red room first.
- ^Note 15: All contestants were nominated by penalty.
- ^Note 16: Mariano used the fulminated nomination and automatically nominated Belén.
- ^Note 17: Francisco, Marian, & Mariano was automatically nominated by Gran Hermano (Big Brother) after receiving a punishment due to their actions during the week.
- ^Note 18: Nicolás was nominated but decided to leave the house in the middle of the nominations.
- ^Note 19: On Day 113, 2 brand new housemates entered the house, and they had connections to the other housemates. They were Yazmín Farjat (Marian's sister) & Eloy Lancelotta (Brian's brother), Rial explained in the liveshow, that both Yazmín and Eloy will stay in the house for a full week, however the public will then decide if either one of them stays or if both will stay in the game. The public was given three choice in that special voting round: A-Save Eloy; B-Save Yazmín; C-Save both. On Day 120 it was revealed that Eloy had the most votes and entered the game while Yazmín was evicted.
- ^Note 20: In Week 13, Big Brother decided to enter two participants to the house, between Ángela, Camila, Eloy R., Francisco and Romina. Francisco returned with 47.6% of the vote, and Camila returned with 42% of the vote.
- ^Note 21: Belén used the fulminated nomination and automatically nominated Mariano.
- ^Note 22: Marian remained on board after receiving punishment for talking about the production.
- ^Note 23: Belén, Francisco & Matías received the fewest votes to evict and therefore saved from eviction. Marian and Mariano remained nominated and one of them will leave next week.

== Trivia ==
On Day 155 (September 30, 2015), the final took place, with Francisco Delgado becoming the winner with 52.7% of all votes against Matías Schrank in the final duel, the 19-year-old student finished as this season's runner-up. The only housemate that never quit or was evicted this season and survived all the way until the end, Belén Etchart, finished in third place while Mariano Berón, who quit and was brought back to the game a week after his exit through public voting, came in fourth place. Francisco Delgado, is the second winner in this franchise to quit the game at some point (he walked out of the game on Day 113), came back and won the season (Francisco returned to the game on Day 120 by a special public vote), the first one to achieve such a feat was Cristian Urrizaga from Gran Hermano Argentina 6.

Also, out of the 4 finalists, three (Francisco, Mariano and Matías) at some point of the game have either been evicted or walked out of the house voluntarily (Matías was evicted on Day 43, Mariano walked on Day 85 and Francisco quit on Day 113) and returned to the game about a week later (Matías re-entered through a public vote on Day 45, Mariano did the same on Day 93 and Francisco did so on Day 120), this has never been seen in a final of this franchise.
