= Grande Fratello season 15 =

Grande Fratello
- Season 15
- Presented by: Barbara D'Urso
- No. of days: 49
- No. of housemates: 17
- Winner: Alberto Mezzetti
- Runner-up: Alessia Prete

Release
- Original network: Canale 5
- Original release: 17 April – 4 June 2018

Season chronology
- ← Previous; Season 14 Next → Season 16

Grande Fratello 15 is the fifteenth season of the Italian version of the reality show franchise Big Brother. The season premiered on 17 April 2018 and concluded on 4 June 2018. It is the shortest season of the Grande Fratello series, lasting only 49 days.

Barbara D'Urso returned as the main host of the show. Alberto Mezzetti emerged as the winner of the season.

== Housemates ==
Housemates	Age	Birthplace	Occupation	Day entered	Day exited	Status
Alberto Mezzetti	34	Viterbo	Business owner	1	49	Winner
Alessia Prete	22	Volvera	Student	1	49	Runner-up
Matteo Gentili	28	Viareggio	Soccer player; Ex-boyfriend of Paola Di Benedetto	1	49	3rd Place
Lucia Orlando	28	Rome	Shop assistant	1	49	4th Place
Simone Coccia Colaiuta	34	L'Aquila	Former stripper and dancer; Stefania Pezzopane's boyfriend	1	49	5th Place
Veronica Satti	27	Genoa	Unemployed; Bobby Solo's daughter	1	49	10th Evicted
Filippo Contri	25	Rome	Financial consultant	1	43	9th Evicted
Danilo Aquino	31	Rome	Appliance Technician	1	43	8th Evicted
Angelo Giuseppe Sanzio	28	Civitavecchia	Perfume maker	1	36	7th Evicted
Lucia Merisio "Bramieri"	57	Milan	Hairdressing salon owner; Daughter-in-law of Gino Bramieri	1	36	6th Evicted
Luigi Mario Favoloso	30	Torre del Greco	Digital manager; Ex-boyfriend of Nina Morić	1	29	Ejected
Mariana Falace	23	Castellammare di Stabia	Model	1	29	5th Evicted
Aída Nízar Delgado	42	Valladolid, Spain	TV personality; Gran Hermano Spain season 5 and GHVIP 5 housemate	7	22	4th Evicted
Patrizia Bonetti	22	Bologna	Student	1	14	3rd Evicted
Baye Dame Dia	29	Rome	Shop assistant and drag queen	1	14	Ejected
Valerio Logrieco	29	Bitonto	Model	1	7	2nd Evicted
Simone Poccia	23	Gaeta	Professional athlete	1	1	1st Evicted

== Nominations table ==
	Week 1		Week 2	Week 3	Week 4	Week 5		Week 6			Week 7					Nominations received
	Day 1	Day 7	Week 2	Week 3	Week 4	Day 29	Day 36	Day 36	Day 43		Day 43	Final				Nominations received
Alberto	Simone P.	Not; Eligible	Filippo	Matteo	Matteo	Lucia B.	Saved	Filippo	Matteo	Saved	Nominated	Finalist		Nominated	Winner (Day 49)	13
Alessia	(2) Valerio	Not; Eligible	Lucia O.	Simone C.	Danilo	Lucia B.	Matteo to save	Danilo	Saved	Nominated	Finalist		Nominated	Nominated	Runner-up (Day 49)	2
Matteo	Filippo	Not; Eligible	Alberto	Alberto	Alberto	Lucia B.	Saved	Alberto	Alberto; Filippo	Alessia	Finalist	Nominated	Finalist	Nominated	Third Place (Day 49)	4
Lucia O.	(2) Simone P.	Not; Eligible	Patrizia	Alberto	Simone C.	Simone C.	Danilo to save	Alberto	Matteo	Alessia	Finalist		Nominated	Fourth Place (Day 49)		4
Simone C.	Valerio	Not; Eligible	Filippo	Matteo	Danilo	Danilo	Alberto to save	Lucia O.	Alessia	Alberto	Finalist	Nominated	Fifth Place (Day 49)			11
Veronica	(2) Simone P.	Not; Eligible	Alessia	Alberto	Mariana	Alessia	Alberto to save	Danilo	Matteo	Alessia	Nominated	Evicted (Day 49)				1
Filippo	Nominated		Alberto	Simone C.	Mariana	Simone C.	Nominated	Alberto	Alessia	Evicted (Day 43)						9
Danilo	Simone P.	Not; Eligible	Filippo	Simone C.	Simone C.	Lucia B.	Matteo to save	Veronica	Evicted (Day 43)							8
Angelo	Filippo	Not; Eligible	Filippo	Simone C.	Danilo	Alberto	Nominated	Evicted (Day 36)								0
Lucia B.	(2) Simone P.	Not; Eligible	Lucia O.	Simone C.	Simone C.	Danilo	Evicted (Day 36)									4
Luigi	Valerio	Not; Eligible	Alberto	Alberto	Mariana	Ejected (Day 29)										1
Mariana	(2) Valerio	Not; Eligible	Patrizia	Simone C.	Luigi	Evicted (Day 29)										3
Aída	Not in House		Exempt	Matteo	Evicted (Day 22)											0
Patrizia	(2) Filippo	Not; Eligible	Lucia O.	Evicted (Day 14)												2
Baye	Valerio	Not; Eligible	Alberto	Ejected (Day 14)												0
Valerio	Nominated		Evicted (Day 7)													7
Simone P.	Nominated	Evicted (Day 1)														8
Notes	1, 2		3, 4	5												
Nominated	Filippo; Simone P. Valerio	Filippo; Valerio	Alberto; Filippo; Lucia O. Patrizia	Aída; Alberto; Luigi; Simone C.	Danilo; Mariana; Simone C.	Danilo; Lucia B. Simone C.	Angelo; Filippo; Simone C.	Alberto; Danilo; Filippo; Lucia O. Veronica	Alberto; Filippo; Matteo	Alessia; Lucia O. Veronica	Alberto; Veronica	Matteo; Simone C.	Alessia; Lucia O.	Alberto; Alessia; Matteo	Alberto; Alessia	
Ejected	none		Baye	none	Luigi	none										
Evicted	Simone P. 8 of 19 votes to evict	Valerio; 66.6% to evict	Patrizia; 48.2% to evict	Aída; 51.5% to evict	Mariana; 54% to evict	Lucia B. 44% to evict	Simone C. 38% to be finalist	Danilo; 35% to evict	Matteo; 42% to be finalist	Alessia; 64% to be finalist	Veronica; 60% to evict	Simone C. 74% to evict	Lucia O. 67% to evict	Matteo; 22% to win	Alessia; 43% to win	
Evicted	Simone P. 8 of 19 votes to evict	Valerio; 66.6% to evict	Patrizia; 48.2% to evict	Aída; 51.5% to evict	Mariana; 54% to evict	Lucia B. 44% to evict	Angelo; 28% to be finalist	Danilo; 35% to evict	Filippo; 26% to be finalist	Lucia O. 19% to be finalist	Veronica; 60% to evict	Simone C. 74% to evict	Lucia O. 67% to evict	Matteo; 22% to win	Alessia; 43% to win	
Saved	Valerio; 7 of 19 votes Filippo; 4 of 19 votes	Filippo; 33.4%	Filippo; 19.7% Alberto; 19.1% Lucia O. 13.0%	Luigi; 42.9% Simone C. 3.7% Alberto; 1.8%	Simone C. 24% Danilo; 22%	Simone C. 32% Danilo; 24%	Filippo; 34% to be finalist	Filippo; 20% Lucia O. 16%. Veronica; 15% Alberto; 14%	Alberto; 32% to be finalist	Veronica; 17% to be finalist	Alberto; 40%	Matteo; 26%	Alessia; 33%	Alessia; 28% Alberto; 50%	Alberto; 57% to win	

=== Notes ===
- ^Note 1: The only eligible housemates to be nominated were Filippo, Simone P. and Valerio. The housemate with most votes would be immediately evicted and the other two housemates would remain nominated.
- ^Note 2: The female votes counted double.
- ^Note 3: Aída as a new housemate, was exempt from nominations.
- ^Note 4: In this round of nominations, the male housemates nominated male housemates and the female housemates nominated female housemates.
- ^Note 5: Aída and Luigi were nominated by Grande Fratello because of their aggressive behaviour.

== TV Ratings ==
Episode	Date	Viewers	Share	Special Guest
1	April 17, 2018	3.598.000	22.60%	Aída Yéspica
2	April 23, 2018	3.479.000	20.95%	Paola Di Benedetto
3	April 30, 2018	4.766.000	27.20%	-
4	May 8, 2018	4.055.000	23.90%	Marco Ferri
5	May 15, 2018	4.237.000	24.90%	Stefania Pezzopane and Nina Morić
6	May 22, 2018	3.738.000	21.80%	Nina Morić
7	May 29, 2018	3.416.000	21.00%	Elena Morali, Floriana Secondi and Fabiana Britto
8	June 4, 2018	3.797.000	23.60%	Gina Lollobrigida and Stefania Pezzopane
Average		3.883.000	23.23%	
