= Gran Hermano Dúo 2 =

Spanish television show

- Season 2
- Presented by: Marta Flich
- No. of days: 53
- No. of housemates: 13
- Winner: Lucía Sánchez
- Runner-up: Asraf Beno

Release
- Original network: Telecinco
- Original release: 11 January – 3 March 2024

Season chronology
- ← Previous; Gran Hermano Dúo Next → Gran Hermano Dúo 3

Gran Hermano Dúo 2 is the second season of Gran Hermano Dúo, spin-off of the Spanish reality TV franchise Gran Hermano. The season was launched on 11 January 2024 on Telecinco. Marta Flich is the host of this version of the show, and Ion Aramendi is the host of the weekly Debate.

== Housemates ==
The first official housemates of the season, Luca Onestini and Elena Rodríguez, were announced on 21 December 2023, during the finale of Gran Hermano VIP 8. On 7 January 2024, in the television show Fiesta, Ana María Aldón was confirmed as official housemate. The rest of the housemates were confirmed days later and, some of them, during the first program of the season.

Housemates	Age	Famous for being...	Entered	Exited	Status
Lucía Sánchez Manuel's ex-girlfriend & Mayka's ex-friend	29	LIDLT 3 star	Day 1	Day 53	Winner
Asraf Beno Elena's TV enemy	28	Isa Pantoja´s husband; Míster Universo Mundial 2018	Day 1	Day 53	Runner-up
Manuel González Lucía's ex-boyfriend & Mayka's ex-affaire	32	LIDLT 3 star	Day 1	Day 50	Third place
Elena Rodríguez Asraf's TV enemy	50	Adara Molinero's mother	Day 1	Day 48	10th evicted
Mayka Rivera Manuel's ex-affaire & Lucía's ex-friend	32	LIDLT 2 star	Day 1	Day 46	9th evicted
Marta López Efrén's ex-girlfriend	50	TV panelist	Day 1	Day 43	8th evicted
Pao Ramírez, Keroseno Finito's brother	26	Artist, TikTok star	Day 1	Day 43	7th evicted
Ana María Aldón Marc's ex-represented	46	TV personality	Day 1	Day 36	6th evicted
(Argentina) Ivana Icardi Luca's ex-sister-in-law	28	Influencer and reality TV star	Day 1	Day 29	5th evicted
Efrén Reyero Marta's ex-boyfriend	41	MYHYV star	Day 1	Day 22	4th evicted
Marc Florensa Ana María's ex-manager	34	Talent manager	Day 1	Day 22	3rd evicted
Finito Keroseno's brother	27	Artist, TikTok star	Day 1	Day 15	2nd evicted
(Italy) Luca Onestini Ivana's ex-brother-in-law	31	Model & reality TV star	Day 1	Day 8	1st evicted

== Nominations table ==
	Duos Phase			Individual Phase								
	Week 1	Week 2	Week 3		Week 4	Week 5	Week 6	Week 7				
	Week 1	Week 2	Week 3		Week 4	Week 5	Week 6	Day 43	Day 46	Day 48	Day 50/53	
Head(s) of Household	Finito & Keroseno	Ana Mª & Marc	Ivana & Keroseno	none	Ivana & Keroseno	Manuel	none					
Lucía	(1) Ana Mª & Marc (1) Ivana & Luca	Finito & Keroseno; Asraf & Elena	Nominated	Nominated	Keroseno; Ivana; Ana Mª	(3) Keroseno (3) Asraf (1) Ana Mª	Keroseno; Asraf; Elena	No; Nominations	No; Nominations	No; Nominations	No; Nominations	Winner (Day 53)
Asraf	(2) Ivana & Luca (1) Lucía, Manuel & Mayka	Lucía, Manuel & Mayka; Finito & Keroseno	Nominated	Nominated	Manuel; Mayka; Lucía	(3) Mayka (2) Lucía (1) Keroseno	Manuel; Mayka; Lucía	No; Nominations	No; Nominations	No; Nominations	No; Nominations	Runner-up (Day 53)
Manuel	(1) Ana Mª & Marc (1) Ivana & Luca	Finito & Keroseno; Asraf & Elena	Nominated	Nominated	Ivana; Keroseno; Asraf	(4) Asraf (3) Keroseno (1) Ana Mª	Asraf; Marta; Keroseno	No; Nominations	No; Nominations	No; Nominations	No; Nominations	Third Place (Day 50)
Elena	(2) Ivana & Luca (1) Lucía, Manuel & Mayka	Lucía, Manuel & Mayka; Finito & Keroseno	Saved	Nominated	Ana Mª; Keroseno; Ivana	(5) Ana Mª (1) Keroseno	Manuel; Keroseno; Lucía	No; Nominations	No; Nominations	No; Nominations	Evicted (Day 48)	
Mayka	(1) Ana Mª & Marc (1) Ivana & Luca	Finito & Keroseno; Asraf & Elena	Saved	Nominated	Ivana; Ana Mª; Keroseno	(3) Ana Mª (2) Keroseno	Keroseno; Asraf; Elena	No; Nominations	No; Nominations	Evicted (Day 46)		
Marta	~~(3) Luca & Ivana~~; ~~(1) Ana Mª & Marc~~	Finito & Keroseno; Lucía, Manuel & Mayka	Nominated	Nominated	Keroseno; Ivana; Ana Mª	(3) Keroseno (2) Ana Mª	Keroseno; Manuel; Lucía	No; Nominations	Evicted (Day 43)			
Keroseno	(2) Efrén & Marta (1) Ana Mª & Marc	Efrén & Marta; Lucía, Manuel & Mayka	Saved	Nominated	Mayka; Marta; Manuel	(2) Elena	Marta; Mayka; Manuel	Evicted (Day 43)				
Ana María	(2) Lucía, Manuel & Mayka (2) Asraf & Elena	Finito & Keroseno; Lucía, Manuel & Mayka	Saved	Nominated	Elena; Mayka; Marta	(6) Mayka (2) Keroseno (1) Lucía	Evicted (Day 36)					
Ivana	(2) Efrén & Marta (1) Asraf & Elena	Efrén & Marta; Lucía, Manuel & Mayka	Immunized	Nominated	Mayka; Marta; Manuel	Evicted (Day 29)	Guest (Day 36–39)	Evicted (Day 29)				
Efrén	~~(3) Luca & Ivana~~; ~~(1) Ana Mª & Marc~~	Finito & Keroseno; Lucía, Manuel & Mayka	Saved	Nominated	Evicted (Day 22)							
Marc	(2) Lucía, Manuel & Mayka (2) Asraf & Elena	Finito & Keroseno; Lucía, Manuel & Mayka	Nominated	Evicted (Day 22)								
Finito	(2) Efrén & Marta (1) Ana Mª & Marc	Efrén & Marta; Lucía, Manuel & Mayka	Evicted (Day 15)				Guest (Day 36–39)	Evicted (Day 15)				
Luca	(2) Efrén & Marta (1) Asraf & Elena	Evicted (Day 8)										
Notes	1, 2	3, 4	5, 6	7	8, 9	10, 11	12, 13	none				
Nominated (pre-HoH)	none	Finito; Keroseno; Lucía; Manuel; Mayka	Asraf; Ivana; Lucía; Manuel; Marc; Marta	none	Ana Mª; Keroseno; Ivana; Mayka	Ana Mª; Asraf; Keroseno; Mayka	Asraf; Keroseno; Manuel; Marta	none				
Saved (by HoH)	none	none	Ivana	none	Keroseno	Keroseno	Manuel	none				
Nominated for eviction	Asraf; Efrén; Elena; Ivana; Luca; Lucía; Manuel; Marta; Mayka	Finito; Keroseno; Lucía; Manuel; Mayka	Asraf; Lucía; Manuel; Marc; Marta	Ana Mª; Asraf; Efrén; Elena; Ivana; Keroseno; Lucía; Manuel; Marta; Mayka	Ana Mª; Ivana; Marta; Mayka	Ana Mª; Asraf; Elena; Mayka	Asraf; Elena; Keroseno; Marta	Asraf; Elena; Lucía; Manuel; Marta; Mayka	Asraf; Elena; Lucía; Manuel; Mayka	Asraf; Elena; Lucía; Manuel	Asraf; Lucía; Manuel	
Evicted	Luca; 60% to evict (out of 2)	Finito; 50.5% to evict (out of 3)	Marc; Most votes to evict (out of 4)	Efrén; Fewest votes to save	Ivana; 54% to evict (out of 2)	Ana María; 61% to evict (out of 2)	Keroseno; 64% to evict (out of 2)	Marta; 7% to save (out of 6)	Mayka; 8.5% to save (out of 5)	Elena; 9.8% to save (out of 4)	Lucía; 53.1% to win (out of 2)	
Evicted	Luca; 60% to evict (out of 2)	Finito; 50.5% to evict (out of 3)	Marc; Most votes to evict (out of 4)	Efrén; Fewest votes to save	Ivana; 54% to evict (out of 2)	Ana María; 61% to evict (out of 2)	Keroseno; 64% to evict (out of 2)	Marta; 7% to save (out of 6)	Mayka; 8.5% to save (out of 5)	Elena; 9.8% to save (out of 4)	Manuel; 28.6% to win (out of 3)	Asraf; 46.9% to win (out of 2)

=== Notes ===
This housemate was the Head of Household.
This housemate was directly nominated for eviction prior to the regular nominations process.
This housemate was granted immunity from nominations.

- ^Note 1: The HoHs won the power to veto a couple of housemates at nominating. Finito & Keroseno vetoed Efrén & Marta.
- ^Note 2: The housemates had to earn points to nominate from a physical task.
- ^Note 3: The housemates nominated the first pair with 3 points and the second pair with 1 point.
- ^Note 4: The HoH won the power to save one of the nominated pairs and replace them with another pair. Ana Mª & Marc decided not to use it.
- ^Note 5: Each duo must choose one member of their own duo as the nominee of the week.
- ^Note 6: After a game of salvation, Ivana manages to save herself from the nomination.
- ^Note 7: In a double eviction, all the housemates were automatically nominated.
- ^Note 8: Since this week, the housemates participate individually and nominates with 3, 2 and 1 point.
- ^Note 9: As Ivana & Keroseno won last week challenge, they have the power to save a housemates and nominate another one.
- ^Note 10: Housemates could steal some points from another housemates according to a challenge.
- ^Note 11: The evicted housemate of this week could pick a box with a power in it. Ivana randomly picked the power of saving a nominated housemate and name another one. She saved Keroseno and nominated Elena.
- ^Note 12: An express public vote was opened to save one of the nominees. Manuel received most of the votes and was saved. Additionally he won the power to automatically nominate a housemate. He chose Elena.
- ^Note 13: The public had the chance to pick among some evicted housemates (Finito, Marc or Ivana) to live in the house as guests for three days. The public voted for Finito and he had the power to invite another one, so he chose Ivana.

== Nominations total received ==
	Week 1	Week 2	Week 3		Week 4	Week 5	Week 6	Week 7	Final		Total
Lucía	3	7	–	–	1	3	3	–	–	Winner	17
Asraf	3	1	–	–	1	7	7	–	–	Runner-up	19
Manuel	3	7	–	–	5	–	9	–	–	Third Place	24
Elena	3	1	–	–	3	2	2	–	–	Evicted	11
Mayka	3	7	–	–	10	9	4	–	Evicted		33
Marta	4	6	–	–	5	0	5	–	Evicted		20
Keroseno	–	10	–	–	11	15	12	Evicted			48
Ana Mª	2	–	–	–	7	12	Evicted				21
Ivana	3	0	–	–	11	Evicted					14
Efrén	4	6	–	–	Evicted						10
Marc	2	–	–	Evicted							2
Finito	–	10	Evicted								10
Luca	3	Evicted									3

== Blind results ==
Week	1stPlace to Evict	2ndPlace to Evict	3rdPlace to Evict	4thPlace to Evict	5thPlace to Evict	6thPlace to Evict	7thPlace to Evict	8thPlace to Evict	9thPlace to Evict
1	22%	21%	21%	14%	8%	7%	3%	3%	1%
1	31%	19%	16%	12%	7%	7%	3%	3%	2%
1	37%	26%	22%	15%					
1	60%	40%							
2	46%	28%	15%	7%	4%				
2	41%	34%	15%	6%	4%				
2	40%	38%	16%	6%					
2	43%	34%	18%	5%					
2	50%	29%	21%						
2	50.4%	28.3%	21.3%						
2	50.5%	27.8%	21.7%						
3	44%	27%	23%	5%	1%				
4	36%	35%	16%	13%					
4	36%	35%	16%	13%					
4	35%	35%	17%	13%					
4	35%	34%	17%	14%					
4	40%	40%	20%						
4	42%	33%	25%						
4	43%	32%	25%						
4	56%	44%							
4	54%	46%							
5	49%	22%	15%	14%					
5	47%	24%	15%	14%					
5	48%	24%	15%	13%					
5	52%	30%	18%						
5	50%	32%	18%						
5	61%	39%							
6	48%	28%	12%	12%					
6	48%	28%	13%	11%					
6	55%	30%	15%						
6	64%	36%							
Final	31%	28%	20%	8%	7%	6%			
Final	30%	27%	19%	9%	8%	7%			
Final	30.3%	26.2%	25.9%	9.1%	8.5%				
Final	32.6%	30.3%	27.4%	9.7%					
Final	32.4%	30.5%	27.3%	9.8%					
Final	36.3%	35.1%	28.6%						
Final	36.3%	35.2%	28.5%						
Final	36%	35.4%	28.6%						
Final	35.9%	35.5%	28.6%						
Final	50.3%	49.7%							
Final	50.2%	49.8%							
Final	50.3%	49.7%							
Final	51.8%	48.2%							
Final	52.4%	47.6%							
Final	52.6%	47.4%							
Final	53.1%	46.9%							

== Ratings ==
=== "Galas" ===
Show N°	Day	Viewers	Ratings share
1 – Launch	Thursday, 11 January	931.000	12.7%
2	Thursday, 18 January	890.000	11.9%
3	Thursday, 25 January	957.000	13.7%
4	Thursday, 1 February	960.000	12.7%
5	Thursday, 8 February	926.000	12.3%
6	Thursday, 15 February	912.000	12.5%
7	Thursday, 22 February	955.000	12.4%
8 – Semifinal 1	Sunday, 25 February	1.085.000	11.4%
9 – Semifinal 2	Tuesday, 27 February	925.000	13.2%
10 – Final 1	Thursday, 29 February	1.238.000	18.4%
11 – Final 2	Sunday, 3 March	1.212.000	13.0%

=== "Debates" ===
Show N°	Day	Viewers	Ratings share
1	Sunday, 14 January	998.000	11.0%
2	Sunday, 21 January	982.000	10.6%
3	Sunday, 28 January	921.000	10.4%
4	Sunday, 4 February	954.000	10.6%
5	Sunday, 11 February	1.024.000	11.3%
6	Sunday, 18 February	1.008.000	11.6%

=== "Súper Martes" ===
Show N°	Day	Viewers	Ratings share
1	Tuesday, 16 January	813.000	11.0%
2	Tuesday, 23 January	895.000	11.9%
3	Tuesday, 30 January	841.000	11.4%
4	Tuesday, 6 February	960.000	12.3%
5	Tuesday, 13 February	881.000	11.6%
