= Grande Fratello season 16 =

Grande Fratello
- Season 16
- Presented by: Barbara D'Urso
- No. of days: 64
- No. of housemates: 17
- Winner: Martina Nasoni
- Runner-up: Enrico Contarin

Release
- Original network: Canale 5 Italia 1 Mediaset Extra; La5
- Original release: 8 April – 10 June 2019

Season chronology
- ← Previous; Season 15

Grande Fratello 16 is the sixteenth season of the Italian version of the reality show franchise Big Brother. The season premiered on 8 April 2019 on Canale 5 and concluded on 10 June 2019 for a total of 64 days.

Barbara D'Urso as the main host of the show. The opinionists of this season will be Iva Zanicchi and Cristiano Malgioglio.

The prize for the winner is €100,000.

The primetime show is on every Monday night on Canale 5. The daytime show is broadcast from Monday to Friday at 4:10 pm on Canale 5 and at 1:00 pm and 7:15 pm on Italia 1. Live stream from the house is on every day from 10:00 am to 2:00 am on Mediaset Extra channel and also provided free of charge via the Mediaset Fan app and on the official website of Grande Fratello. Additional contents will be broadcast on La5 and in the various magazine shows of Canale 5, such as Mattino Cinque, Pomeriggio Cinque, Domenica Live and Live - Non è la D'Urso.

As what happened in the Grande Fratello 15, some housemates are already known by the public for having participated in some television programs or for being "relatives" or "ex-boyfriends or ex-girlfriends" of famous people. Therefore, the show also called Grande Fratello Nip by the production or press.

== The Grande Ranch ==
On 3 April 2019, five days before the show begins, four possible competitors were locked up in a ranch nearby the Lazio countryside waiting to learn about their destiny. They are Audrey Chabloz, Angela Losito, Erica Piamonte and Daniele Dal Moro.

In the "Grande Ranch", the four competitors will be challenged with horse saddling, the management and care of farm animals, egg collection and more. And there will be moments of leisure and relaxation in the pool. While they remaining isolated, they were able to interact with the outside through the social networks of Grande Fratello. The cohabitation is informed by the presenter Barbara D'Urso through the show Pomeriggio Cinque.

== Housemates ==
Housemates	Age	Birthplace	Occupation	Day entered	Day exited	Status
Martina Nasoni	21	Terni	Tattoo artist	1	64	Winner
Enrico Contarin	26	Treviso	Marketing manager	1	64	Runner-up
Gianmarco Onestini	22	Castel San Pietro Terme	Student	1	64	3rd Place
Daniele Dal Moro	28	Verona	Entrepreneur and model	1	64	4th Place
Gennaro Lillio	27	Naples	Model; Ex-boyfriend of Lory Del Santo	1	64	5th Place
Erica Piamonte	30	Florence	Model and mall center employee	1	64	13th Evicted
Francesca De André (Note: On April 15, Fabrizia De André renounces the entrance of the house, letting her sister Francesca entered the House as a single housemate.)	29	Genoa	Model; Cristiano De André's daughter	8	64	12th Evicted
Michael Terlizzi	32	Lecco	Model; Son of Franco Terlizzi	1	57	11th Evicted
Valentina Vignali	27	Rimini	Basketball player	1	57	10th Evicted
Illio "Kikò" Nalli	48	Sabaudia	Hair stylist; Ex-husband of Tina Cipollari	1	57	9th Evicted
Serena Rutelli	29	Rome	Beautician	1	50	8th Evicted
Gaetano Arena	22	Naples	Model	1	43	7th Evicted
Mila Suarez	31	Casablanca, Morocco	Model; Ex-girlfriend of Alex Belli	1	36	6th Evicted
Jessica Mazzoli	27	Milan	Singer; X Factor season 5 contestant	1	29 (Note: On Day 19, Jessica left the house for medical reasons. On Day 29, It was announced by Barbara D'Urso that she will not return in the house.)	Walked
Cristian Imparato	23	Palermo	Singer; Io canto season 1 winner	1	29	5th Evicted
Ivana Icardi	23	Rosario, Argentina	Gran Hermano Argentina 2016 housemate	1	22	4th Evicted
Ambra Lombardo	33	Modica	Teacher	1	16	3rd Evicted
Audrey Chabloz	26	Aosta	Model	1	8	2nd Evicted
Angela Losito	28	Bari	Communication Sciences graduated	1	1	1st Evicted

=== Guest ===
Name	Age	Residence	Occupation	Secret/Mission	Day entered	Day exited
Alberico Lemme	61	Chieti	Pharmacist and VIP Dietician	They must make everyone believe that they are official housemates of Grande Fratello, but in reality, they will only be guests inside the house.	8	22
Guendalina Canessa	37	Florence	Public figure; Grande Fratello 7 housemate	They must make everyone believe that they are official housemates of Grande Fratello, but in reality, they will only be guests inside the house.	22	36
Vladimir Luxuria	53	Foggia	Public figure and former politician	They have to stay inside the house to 'stir the pot' and entertain the other houseguests.	43	50
Taylor Mega	25	Milan	Social media influencer, model and socialite	They have to stay inside the house to 'stir the pot' and entertain the other houseguests.	50	57

== Future Appearances ==
In 2022, Daniele Dal Moro returned to compete in Grande Fratello VIP 7.

== Nominations table ==
	Grande Ranch	Week 1		Week 2	Week 3	Week 4	Week 5	Week 6	Week 7		Week 8				Week 9					Nominations received
	Grande Ranch	Day 1	Day 2	Week 2	Week 3	Week 4	Week 5	Week 6	Day 43	Day 50		Day 57				Final				Nominations received
Favorite of the House	none				Kikò	~~Daniele~~; Enrico	Kikò	Gianmarco	none											Nominations received
Martina	Housemate	Not; Eligible		Ambra	Mila	Mila	Gianmarco; Mila	Enrico; Gaetano	Gianmarco; Michael	Saved	Erica; Kikò	Nominated	Finalist				Nominated	Nominated	Winner (Day 64)	8
Enrico	Housemate	Angela	Not; Eligible	Michael	Michael	Exempt	Martina; Mila	Gaetano; Serena	Francesca; Martina	Nominated	Francesca; Michael	Not; Eligible	Michael	Not; Eligible	Nominated	Finalist		Nominated	Runner-up (Day 64)	11
Gianmarco	Housemate	Angela	Not; Eligible	Cristian	Cristian	Daniele	Martina; Mila	Exempt	Martina; Serena	Saved	Francesca; Kikò	Not; Eligible	Enrico	Finalist		Nominated	Finalist	Nominated	Third Place (Day 64)	5
Daniele	Potential; Housemate	Erica to save	Not; Eligible	Exempt	Gianmarco	Cristian	Erica; Mila	Erica; Gaetano	Erica; Serena	Saved	Enrico; Erica	Not; Eligible	Saved	Nominated	Finalist		Nominated	Fourth Place (Day 64)		7
Gennaro	Housemate	Audrey	Not; Eligible	Enrico	Michael	Serena	Mila; Serena	Erica; Serena	Enrico; Serena	Enrico	Finalist					Nominated	Fifth Place (Day 64)			4
Erica	Potential; Housemate	Saved	Nominated	Exempt	Mila	Mila	Daniele; Mila	Gaetano; Michael	Gennaro; Michael	Saved	Michael; Valentina	Valentina	Not; Eligible		Nominated	Evicted (Day 64)				14
Francesca	Not in House			Exempt	Mila	Mila	Mila; Serena	Michael; Serena	Enrico; Serena	Saved	Enrico; Valentina	Saved	Not; Eligible	Nominated	Nominated	Evicted (Day 64)				4
Michael	Housemate	Audrey	Not; Eligible	Enrico	Enrico	Mila	Erica; Mila	Gaetano; Serena	Martina; Serena	Saved	Enrico; Erica	Not; Eligible	Nominated	Evicted (Day 57)						12
Valentina	Housemate	Not; Eligible		Ivana	Mila	Mila	Erica; Mila	Gaetano; Serena	Martina; Michael	Kikò	Erica; Kikò	Martina	Evicted (Day 57)							3
Kikò	Housemate	Angela	Not; Eligible	Gennaro	Exempt	Mila	Exempt	Erica; Gaetano	Erica; Martina	Gennaro	Daniele; Erica	Evicted (Day 57)								5
Serena	Housemate	Not; Eligible		Ambra	Erica	Daniele	Enrico; Gennaro	Gaetano; Michael	Gennaro; Michael	Evicted (Day 50)										16
Gaetano	Housemate	Angela	Not; Eligible	Gianmarco	Daniele	Mila	Martina; Mila	Kikò; Serena	Evicted (Day 43)											9
Mila	Housemate	Not; Eligible		Serena	Ivana	Kikò	Enrico; Gaetano	Evicted (Day 36)												23
Jessica	Housemate	Not; Eligible		Mila	Francesca	Hospitalized (Day 19)	Walked (Day 29)													0
Cristian	Housemate	Audrey	Not; Eligible	Gianmarco	Daniele	Daniele	Evicted (Day 29)													3
Ivana	Housemate	Not; Eligible		Valentina	Mila	Evicted (Day 22)														2
Ambra	Housemate	Not; Eligible		Serena	Evicted (Day 16)															2
Audrey	Potential; Housemate	Nominated	Nominated	Evicted (Day 8)																3
Angela	Potential; Housemate	Nominated	Evicted (Day 1)																	4
Note	Grande Ranch	1		2	3	4, 5	6, 7	7		8	9	10	11	12	13					
Nominated		Angela; Audrey	Audrey; Erica	Ambra; Enrico; Gianmarco; Serena	Daniele; Erica; Francesca; Ivana; Michael; Mila	Cristian; Daniele; Kikò; Mila; Serena	Erica; Martina; Mila	Erica; Gaetano; Michael; Serena	Martina; Michael; Serena	Enrico; Gennaro; Kikò; Valentina	Enrico; Erica; Kikò	Erica; Martina; Valentina	Enrico; Gianmarco; Michael	Daniele; Francesca	Enrico; Erica; Francesca	Gennaro; Gianmarco	Daniele; Martina	Enrico; Gianmarco; Martina	Enrico; Martina	
Walked		none				Jessica	none													
Evicted		Angela; 4 of 7 votes to evict	Audrey; 59% to evict	Ambra; 34% to evict	Ivana; 14% to save	Cristian; 14% to save	Mila; 30% to save	Gaetano; 16% to save	Serena; 25% to save	Gennaro; 39% to be finalist	Kikò; 28% to save	Martina; 51% to be finalist	Gianmarco; 39% to be finalist	Daniele; 77% to be finalist	Francesca; 18% to be finalist	Gennaro; 60% to evict	Daniele; 81% to evict	Gianmarco; 22% to win	Enrico; 40% to win	
Evicted		Angela; 4 of 7 votes to evict	Audrey; 59% to evict	Ambra; 34% to evict	Ivana; 14% to save	Cristian; 14% to save	Mila; 30% to save	Gaetano; 16% to save	Serena; 25% to save	Gennaro; 39% to be finalist	Kikò; 28% to save	Valentina; 17% to be finalist	Michael; 25% to be finalist	Daniele; 77% to be finalist	Erica; 38% to be finalist	Gennaro; 60% to evict	Daniele; 81% to evict	Gianmarco; 22% to win	Enrico; 40% to win	
Saved	Daniele; Chosen by Grande Fratello	Audrey; 3 of 7 votes	Erica; 41%	Serena; 24% Gianmarco; 22% Enrico; 20%	Francesca; 19% Michael; 18% Daniele; 17% Erica; 17% Mila; 15%	Kikò; 30% Mila; 19% Serena; 19% Daniele; 18%	Martina; 38% Erica; 32%	Erica; 33% Serena; 26% Michael; 25%	Martina; 46% Michael; 29%	Enrico; 32% Kikò; 20% Valentina; 9%	Erica; 39% Enrico; 33%	Erica; 32%	Enrico; 36%	Francesca; 23%	Enrico; 44% to be finalist	Gianmarco; 40%	Martina; 19%	Martina; 48% Enrico; 30%	Martina; 60% to win	

=== Notes ===
- ^Note 1: The votes are in secret and only male housemates could vote. Only Angela and Audrey could be voted: the housemate with most votes would be immediately evicted and the other one is nominated against Erica, who previously saved by Daniele. Angela was evicted. Later Audrey and Erica were nominated, with the former being voted out.
- ^Note 2: Erica and Daniele who survived eviction the previous week as well as the new housemate Francesca were all immune from nominations.
- ^Note 3: A televoting flash is opened which determines if the guest Alberico can remain in the house, with 54% of the votes he can stay in the house.
- ^Note 4: Jessica leaves the house on Day 19 for medical reasons. On Day 22, Barbara D'Urso explains the doctors will tell production whether or not she can go back to the house in the following days.
- ^Note 5: Daniele was also tied for Favorite of the House but due to his offensive behavior towards Cristian, his perks as Favorite are taken away.
- ^Note 6: On Day 29, Barbara D'Urso explains the doctors said to production that Jessica will not return in the house.
- ^Note 7: This week all the housemates will be able to vote for two people.
- ^Note 8: Valentina is drawn to be nominated and she can pick the person she wants to face the vote with (the housemates think it's a second eviction); she chooses Kikò. He can then choose someone to join them for the vote as well and chooses Gennaro. The 3 nominees are now supposed to come together and choose a fourth person unanimously but they can't make a decision so Barbara D'Urso tells Gennaro to make the decision since he is the last one picked: he chooses Enrico.
- ^Note 9: This week all the housemates have to vote for one woman and one man.
- ^Note 10: Three of the four remaining female housemates need to face eviction. Erica is drawn to be nominated and chooses Valentina to face the vote with her; Valentina chooses Martina to face the vote as well; Francesca is therefore safe. The vote will result in the one with most votes becoming a finalist, the one with fewest votes being evicted and the other one is safe.
- ^Note 11: Three of the four remaining male housemates (except Gennaro since he is already a finalist) need to face eviction. Gianmarco is drawn to be nominated and chooses Enrico to face the vote with him; Enrico chooses Michael to face the vote as well; Daniele is therefore safe. The vote will result in the one with most votes becoming a finalist, the one with fewest votes being evicted and the other one is safe.
- ^Note 12: Daniele and Francesca are nominated since they're the only contestants who haven't faced a flash public vote during the night (as they've both been saved). This public vote, however, will not result in an eviction, but only into one of the two becoming the fourth finalist.
- ^Note 13: Enrico, Erica and Francesca are nominated since they are the only contestants who haven't been declared finalists by the public vote. The vote will result in only one of them joining the other four housemates in the finale and the other two housemates will be evicted.

== TV Ratings ==
Episode	Date	Viewers	Share	Special Guest
1	April 8, 2019	3.405.000	19.30%	-
2	April 15, 2019	2.873.000	17.06%	Karina Cascella and Delia Duran
3	April 22, 2019	2.959.000	17.70%	Alex Belli
4	April 29, 2019	3.202.000	19.32%	Guendalina Tavassi
5	May 6, 2019	3.233.000	19.38%	Daniele Interrante
6	May 13, 2019	3.142.000	18.25%	Francesca Cipriani
7	May 20, 2019	3.404.000	20.80%	-
8	May 27, 2019	3.681.000	22.44%	-
9	June 3, 2019	3.366.000	20.97%	Simone Coccia Colaiuta and Stefania Pezzopane
10	June 10, 2019	3.301.000	22.22%	Taylor Mega, Bobby Solo and Veronica Satti
Average		3.257.000	19.74%	
