= Supervivientes: Perdidos en Honduras (2020) =

- Presented by: Jorge Javier Vázquez; Lara Álvarez
- No. of days: 106
- No. of castaways: 17
- Winner: Jorge Pérez
- Location: Cayos Cochinos, Honduras

Release
- Original network: Telecinco; Cuatro
- Original release: 20 February – 4 June 2020

Season chronology
- ← Previous; 2019 Next → 2021

Supervivientes 2020: Perdidos en Honduras is the fifteenth season of the show Supervivientes and the nineteenth season of Survivor to air in Spain. It was broadcast on Telecinco from 20 February 2020 to 4 June 2020. Jorge Javier Vázquez was the main host at the central studio in Madrid, with Lara Álvarez co-hosting from the island, Jordi Gonzalez hosting a side debate of the program and Carlos Sobera hosting a gala in Cuatro.

Due to the 2020 coronavirus outbreak in Spain, all live shows were aired without a studio audience from 15 March, to respect the governmental procedures which was imposed.

== Cast ==
The contestants were being announced daily by the network.

Contestant	Occupation/Famous For	Original tribe	Absorbed tribe	Switched tribe	Merged tribe	Finish
Beatriz Retamal; 23, Picassent	Gran Hermano 17 winner	Mortals				1st voted out Day 15
Alejandro Reyes; 19, Madrid	Model, Ivonne Reyes' son	Mortals				2nd voted out Day 22
Vicky Larraz; 57, Madrid	Former Olé Olé vocalist	Mortals				3rd voted out Day 29
Cristian Suescun; 33, Pamplona	Sofía Suescun's brother	Mortals				4th voted out Day 36
Antonio Pavón; 38, Málaga	Bullfighter	Servants	Helpless beach			Evacuated; Day 43
Jaime Ferrera, "Ferre"; 26, Huelva	Super Shore star	Servants	Forbidden beach	Mortals		5th voted out Day 50
Fani Carbajo; 35, Madrid	La isla de las tentaciones 1 star	Mortals	Forbidden beach	Servants		6th voted out Day 57
Nyno Vargas; 26, Burjassot	Singer	Mortals	Helpless beach	Servants		7th voted out Day 64
José Antonio Avilés; 23, Córdoba	Television panelist	Servants	Forbidden beach	Mortals		8th voted out Day 71
Yiya del Guillén; 30, Don Benito	UPP3P star	Servants	Helpless beach	Servants	Merged	9th voted out Day 78
Ivana Icardi; 24, Milan, Italy	Reality television star	Mortals	Helpless beach	Servants	Merged	10th voted out Day 85
Elena Rodríguez; 46, Alcobendas	Adara Molinero's mother	Servants	Forbidden beach	Mortals	Merged	11th voted out Day 92
Albert Barranco; 25, Barcelona	MyHyV star	Servants	Forbidden beach	Mortals	Merged	12th voted out Day 99
Hugo Sierra; 46, Mallorca	Gran Hermano Revolution winner	God	Helpless beach	Servants	Merged	13th voted out Day 106
Rocío Flores; 23, Málaga	Rocio Jurado's granddaughter	Servants	Forbidden beach	Mortals	Merged	Third Place; Day 106
Ana María Aldón; 42, Cádiz	Designer, José Ortega Cano's wife	Servants	Helpless beach	Servants	Merged	Runner-Up; Day 106
Jorge Pérez; 37, Reinosa	Civil guard and model	Mortals	Forbidden beach	Mortals	Merged	Sole Survivor; Day 106

== Nominations ==
	Week 1	Week 2	Week 3	Week 4	Week 5	Week 6	Week 7	Week 8	Week 9	Week 10	Week 11	Week 12	Week 13	Week 14	Week 15	Final		Total votes
Jorge	Fani	Ferre	Alejandro	Cristian	Fani	Fani	Avilés	Rocío	Yiya	Hugo	Yiya; Ana M.ª	Hugo; Ivana	Hugo; Rocío	Ana M.ª	Hugo	Nominated	Sole Survivor (Day 106)	14
Ana M.ª	Yiya	Hugo	Fani	Helpless beach			Fani	Fani	Avilés	Avilés	Yiya; Elena	Hugo; Jorge	Jorge; Elena	Jorge	Jorge	Finalist	Runner-Up (Day 106)	9
Rocío	Yiya	Ivana	Cristian	Ivana	Nyno	Ferre	Ferre	Elena	Avilés (x2)	Avilés	Yiya; Hugo	Jorge; Hugo	Jorge; Elena	Jorge	Hugo	Nominated	Third Place (Day 106)	7
Hugo	Exempt	Elena	Fani	Cristian	Helpless beach		Fani	Fani	Nyno	Elena	Yiya; Jorge	Barranco; Jorge	Jorge; Ana M.ª	Barranco	Jorge	Eliminated (Day 106)		17
Barranco	Yiya	Fani	Ana M.ª	Exempt	Cristian	Ferre	Ferre	Elena	Avilés	Avilés	Yiya; Hugo	Ivana; Hugo	Elena	Ana M.ª	Eliminated (Day 99)			6
Elena	Yiya	Antonio	Cristian	Fani	Ferre	Fani	Avilés	Barranco	Nyno	Hugo	Hugo; Rocío	Ivana	Hugo; Rocío	Eliminated (Day 92)				10
Ivana	Alejandro	Rocío	Fani	Avilés	Helpless beach		Fani	Fani	Barranco	Barranco	Elena	Barranco; Jorge	Eliminated (Day 85)					5
Yiya	Barranco	Helpless beach					Fani	Hugo	Nyno	Jorge	Rocío; Jorge	Eliminated (Day 78)						11
Avilés	Yiya	Antonio	Cristian	Ivana	Exempt	Ferre	Elena	Jorge	Ana M.ª	Ana M.ª	Eliminated (Day 71)							15
Nyno	Vicky	Barranco	Ana M.ª	Cristian	Fani	Helpless beach	Hugo	Hugo	Hugo (x2)	Eliminated (Day 64)								4
Fani	Vicky	Barranco	Ana M.ª	Elena	Nyno	Jorge	Yiya	Ivana	Eliminated (Day 57)									15
Ferre	Avilés	Rocío	Exempt	Hugo	Cristian	Avilés	Avilés	Eliminated (Day 50)										4
Antonio	Avilés	Avilés	Helpless beach				Evacuated (Day 43)											3
Cristian	Vicky	Exempt	Elena	Jorge	Ferre	Eliminated (Day 36)												8
Vicky	Bea	Helpless beach			Eliminated (Day 29)													5
Alejandro	Vicky	Bea	Avilés	Eliminated (Day 22)														1
Bea	Vicky	Antonio	Eliminated (Day 15)															1
Notes	See note 1, 2	See note 3, 4, 5	See note 6, 7	See note 8, 9, 10	See note 11, 12	See note 13, 14, 15	See note 16, 17, 18	See note 19, 20	See note 21, 22, 23	See note 24	See note 25, 26, 27	See note 28	See note 29, 30	See note 31, 32	See note 33	See note 34	None	
Nominated by Tribe	Vicky; Yiya	Antonio; Rocío	Ana M.ª; Cristian	Cristian; Fani	Cristian; Fani	Fani	Avilés; Fani	Elena; Fani	Avilés; Nyno	Avilés; Hugo	Hugo; Jorge; Yiya	Hugo; Jorge	Hugo; Jorge	Jorge	Hugo			
Nominated by Leader	Avilés; Fani	Bea; Ferre	Alejandro; Fani	Hugo; Ivana	Ferre; Nyno	Ferre	Ferre; Hugo	Hugo; Jorge	Barranco; Yiya	Barranco; Jorge	Elena	Ivana	Elena	Barranco	Jorge			
Nominated	Avilés; Fani; Vicky; Yiya	Antonio; Bea; Rocío; Ferre	Alejandro; Ana M.ª; Cristian; Fani	Cristian; Fani; Hugo; Ivana	Cristian; Fani; Ferre; Nyno	Fani; Ferre	Avilés; Fani; Ferre; Hugo	Elena; Fani; Hugo; Jorge; Yiya	Avilés; Barranco; Nyno; Yiya	Avilés; Barranco; Hugo; Jorge	Elena; Hugo; Jorge; Yiya	Hugo; Jorge; Ivana	Elena; Hugo; Jorge	Barranco; Jorge	Hugo; Jorge	Jorge; Rocío	Ana M.ª; Jorge	
Eliminated	Vicky; Fewest votes (out of 3)	Bea; Fewest votes (out of 3)	Alejandro; Fewest votes (out of 3)	Ivana; Fewest votes (out of 3)	Nyno; Fewest votes (out of 3)	Fani; Fewest votes to save	Ferre; Fewest votes (out of 3)	Fani; Fewest votes (out of 4)	Nyno; Fewest votes (out of 3)	Avilés; Fewest votes (out of 3)	Yiya; Fewest votes (out of 3)	Ivana; Fewest votes (out of 2)	Elena; Fewest votes (out of 2)	Barranco; Fewest votes to save	Hugo; 48.2% to save	Rocío; 32.8% to save	Ana M.ª; 18.4% to win	
Eliminated	Yiya; Fewest votes (out of 3)	Antonio; Fewest votes (out of 3)	Ana M.ª; Fewest votes (out of 3)	Hugo; Fewest votes (out of 3)	Cristian; Fewest votes (out of 3)	Fani; Fewest votes to save	Ferre; Fewest votes (out of 3)	Fani; Fewest votes (out of 4)	Nyno; Fewest votes (out of 3)	Avilés; Fewest votes (out of 3)	Yiya; Fewest votes (out of 3)	Ivana; Fewest votes (out of 2)	Elena; Fewest votes (out of 2)	Barranco; Fewest votes to save	Hugo; 48.2% to save	Rocío; 32.8% to save	Jorge; 81.6% to win	
Helpless beach Nominated		Antonio; Bea; Vicky; Yiya	Alejandro; Ana M.ª; Antonio; Vicky; Yiya	Ana M.ª; Antonio; Hugo; Ivana; Vicky; Yiya	Ana M.ª; Antonio; Cristian; Hugo; Ivana; Nyno; Yiya	Ana M.ª; ~~Antonio~~; Fani; Hugo; Ivana; Nyno; Yiya												
Helpless beach Eliminated		Bea; Most votes to eliminate	Alejandro; Most votes to eliminate	Vicky; Most votes to eliminate	Cristian; Most votes to eliminate	Eviction cancelled												

- Contestant was fake evicted and sent to the Helpless beach.
- Contestant was immune
- Contestant was leader and whoever they nominated would automatically face elimination (Immune)
- Contestant was nominated

=== Notes ===
- ^Note 1: Hugo was exempt as he was the God of the week. He also chose the leaders of each tribe.
- ^Note 2: As the leaders of the tribes, Antonio and Jorge were given the power to name a nominee.
- ^Note 3: Cristian was exempt as he was the God of the week. He also chose the leader of the Servants tribe.
- ^Note 4: There was a tie between Albert and Rocío in the Mortals tribe and Jorge as leader broke it nominating Rocío.
- ^Note 5: As the leaders of the tribes, Alejandro and Jorge were given the power to name a nominee.
- ^Note 6: Ferre was exempt as he was the God of the week. He also chose the leader of the Servants tribe.
- ^Note 7: As the leaders of the tribes, Ivana and Jorge were given the power to name a nominee.
- ^Note 8: Albert was exempt as he was the God of the week. He also chose the leader of the Servants tribe.
- ^Note 9: There was a tie between all the contestants in the Servants tribe and Rocío as leader broke it nominating Fani.
- ^Note 10: As the leaders of the tribes, Ferre and Rocío were given the power to name a nominee.
- ^Note 11: Jose Antonio was exempt as he was the God of the week. He also chose the leader of the Servants tribe.
- ^Note 12: As the leaders of the tribes, Elena and Rocío were given the power to name a nominee.
- ^Note 13: Since this week, all the contestants were unificated in the same tribe called "Forbidden Beach".
- ^Note 14: As the leader of the tribe, Albert was given the power to name a nominee.
- ^Note 15: There was a tie between Fani and Ferre and Albert as leader broke it nominating Fani.
- ^Note 16: Since this week, the Helpless beach tribe returned to the game as a usual tribe.
- ^Note 17: Antonio was forced to be evacuated for medical reasons, for this reason, the elimination was cancelled.
- ^Note 18: As the leaders of the tribes, Albert and Nyno were given the power to name a nominee.
- ^Note 19: Yiya was automatically nominated for offensive comments towards Rocío.
- ^Note 20: As the leaders of the tribes, Jose Antonio and Nyno were given the power to name a nominee.
- ^Note 21: All the contestants were reallocated in the tribes.
- ^Note 22: Nyno and Rocío won one extra point in a challenge.
- ^Note 23: As the leaders of the tribes, Ivana and Jorge were given the power to name a nominee.
- ^Note 24: As the leaders of the tribes, Ivana and Yiya were given the power to name a nominee.
- ^Note 25: All the remaining contestants merged into one tribe.
- ^Note 26: There was a tie between Jorge and Rocío, Ivana as the leader had to break it nominating Jorge.
- ^Note 27: As the leader of the tribe, Ivana was given the power to name a nominee.
- ^Note 28: As the leader of the tribe, Elena was given the power to name a nominee.
- ^Note 29: There was a tie between Elena, Hugo and Rocío, Albert as leader broke it nominating Hugo.
- ^Note 29: As the leader of the tribe, Albert was given the power to name a nominee.
- ^Note 31: There was a tie between Ana Mª and Jorge, Hugo as leader broke it nominating Jorge.
- ^Note 32: As the leader of the tribe, Hugo was given the power to name a nominee.
- ^Note 33: As the leader of the tribe, Ana Mª was given the power to name a nominee.
- ^Note 34: Ana Mª won the last immunity challenge and went through the final vote. Jorge and Rocío were nominated.

== Tribes ==
	Pre-merge tribes			
	Servants	Mortals	God	Helpless beach
Week 1	Albert; Ana María; Antonio; Elena; Ferre; José Antonio; Rocío; Yiya	Alejandro; Bea; Cristian; Fani; Ivana; Jorge; Nyno; Vicky	Hugo	
Week 2	Alejandro; Ana María; Antonio; Bea; Elena; Hugo; José Antonio	Albert; Fani; Ferre; Ivana; Jorge; Nyno; Rocío	Cristian	Vicky; Yiya
Week 3	Alejandro; Cristian; Elena; Jorge; José Antonio; Rocío	Albert; Ana María; Fani; Hugo; Ivana; Nyno	Ferre	Antonio; Vicky; Yiya
Week 4	Elena; Fani; Ivana; José Antonio; Rocío	Cristian; Ferre; Hugo; Jorge; Nyno	Albert	Ana María; Antonio; Vicky; Yiya
Week 5	Fani; Jorge; Nyno; Rocío	Albert; Cristian; Elena; Ferre	José Antonio	Ana María; Antonio; Hugo; Ivana; Yiya
	First switched tribe			
	Forbidden beach		Helpless beach	
Week 6	Albert; Fani; Jorge; José Antonio; Rocío; Elena; Ferre		Ana María; Antonio; Hugo; Ivana; Nyno; Yiya	
	Second switched tribe			
	Servants		Mortals	
Week 7	Ana María; Fani; Hugo; Ivana; Nyno; Yiya		Albert; Elena; Ferre; Jorge; José Antonio; Rocío	
Week 8	Albert; Elena; Jorge; José Antonio; Rocío		Ana María; Fani; Hugo; Ivana; Nyno; Yiya	
Week 9	Elena; Hugo; Jorge; Nyno; Yiya		Albert; Ana María; Ivana; José Antonio; Rocío	
Week 10	Elena; Hugo; Jorge; Yiya		Albert; Ana María; Ivana; José Antonio; Rocío	

== Ratings ==
=== "Galas" ===
Show N°	Day	Viewers	Ratings share
1 - Launch	Thursday, February 20	3.206.000	32.7%
2	Thursday, February 27	2.837.000	29.1%
3	Thursday, March 5	2.972.000	29.5%
4	Thursday, March 12	2.921.000	27.8%
5	Thursday, March 19	3.465.000	23.3%
6	Thursday, March 26	3.222.000	24.8%
7	Thursday, April 2	3.815.000	27.2%
8	Thursday, April 9	3.618.000	24.5%
9	Thursday, April 16	3.606.000	27.7%
10	Thursday, April 23	3.753.000	29.7%
11	Thursday, April 30	3.916.000	28.7%
12	Thursday, May 7	3.908.000	31.8%
13	Thursday, May 14	3.612.000	30.2%
14	Thursday, May 21	3.664.000	31.2%
15	Thursday, May 28	3.448.000	31.9%
16 - Finale	Thursday, June 4	3.966.000	34.4%

=== "Conexión Honduras" ===
Show N°	Day	Viewers	Ratings share
1	Sunday, February 23	2.331.000	20.0%
2	Sunday, March 1	2.334.000	19.0%
3	Sunday, March 8	2.368.000	19.5%
4	Sunday, March 15	2.598.000	17.5%
5	Sunday, March 22	3.034.000	17.9%
6	Sunday, March 29	3.030.000	18.8%
7	Sunday, April 5	3.069.000	18.8%
8	Sunday, April 12	3.210.000	19.7%
9	Sunday, April 19	3.111.000	20.0%
10	Sunday, April 26	3.319.000	21.6%
11	Sunday, May 3	3.456.000	23.3%
12	Sunday, May 10	3.543.000	24.2%
13	Sunday, May 17	3.149.000	21.6%
14	Sunday, May 24	2.792.000	20.9%

=== "Tierra de Nadie" ===
Show N°	Day	Viewers	Ratings share
1	Tuesday, February 25	2.245.000	23.2%
2	Tuesday, March 3	2.295.000	23.5%
3	Tuesday, March 10	2.284.000	23.1%
4	Tuesday, March 17	2.447.000	20.7%
5	Tuesday, March 24	2.096.000	13.3%
6	Tuesday, March 31	2.989.000	20.7%
7	Tuesday, April 7	2.922.000	21.0%
8	Tuesday, April 14	2.989.000	21.9%
9	Tuesday, April 21	3.162.000	23.2%
10	Tuesday, April 28	3.159.000	23.5%
11	Tuesday, May 5	3.219.000	25.2%
12	Tuesday, May 12	3.023.000	23.9%
13	Tuesday, May 19	3.132.000	24.7%
14	Tuesday, May 26	2.630.000	22.1%
