= Ginocchio =

Ginocchio is a surname. Notable people with the surname include:

- Marcos Ginocchio (born 1999), Argentine model, lawyer, and television personality
- Silvana Ginocchio (born 1965), Argentine politician

== See also ==
- Ginocchio Historic District
