= Dad for a Day =

Dad for a Day may refer to:

- Dad for a Day (1939 film), an Our Gang short comedy film
- Dad for a Day (2009 film), an Argentine sports romantic comedy film
