= Julieta Poggio =

Argentine actress

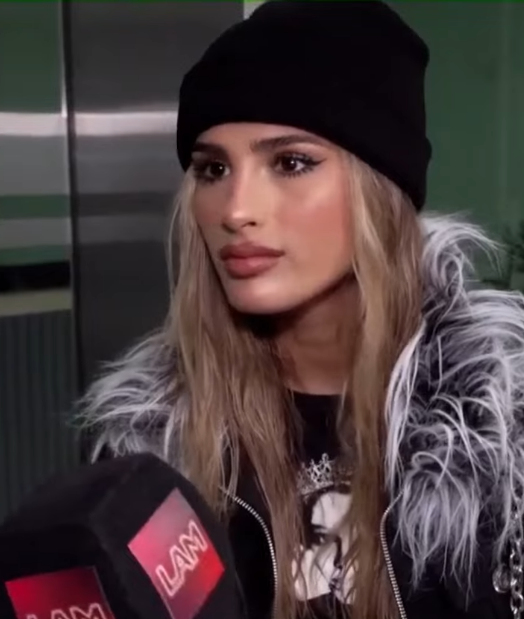
- Poggio in 2024
- Born: 9 January 2002 (age 24); Buenos Aires, Argentina
- Occupations: Model; actress; dance teacher
- Years active: 2009–present

Julieta Poggio (born 9 January 2002) is an Argentine model, actress and dance teacher. She is known for her participation in the tenth season of the Argentine television reality show Gran Hermano (2022–2023).

== Career ==
At age seven, she played Tini in Papá por un día. In 2009, she played Olivia in the youth strip Consentidos. In 2021, Poggio joined the cast of the play Amor propio.

In October 2022, she became one of the 18 selected for the tenth season of the television reality show Gran Hermano Argentina. She became a finalist of the edition, taking the third place house with the 19.66% of the public votes.

== Filmography ==
=== Film ===
Year	Title	Role	Notes
2009	Esperando la carroza 2	Daughter Jorge	
2009	Papá por un día	Martina "Tini" Villaverde	
2010	El héroe al que nadie quiso	Romina′s friend	Short film
2011	Hermanitos del fin del mundo	Micaela	
2012	Al acecho	Loly	Short film
2025	Papá por dos	Rita	

=== Television ===
Year	Title	Role	Notes
2009	Valientes	Alma Varela (child)	Recurring role
2009–2010	Consentidos	Olivia	Main role
2011	Maltratadas	Susana′s daughter	Episodes: «El ídolo de Barro», «El ídolo de Barro 2»
2012	Dulce Amor	Natacha Bandi (child)	Recurring role
2012–2013	La Guarida Secreta	Pamela	Main role
2015	El mal menor	Geraldine	Episode 9: «Mora»
2022–2024	Gran Hermano	Contestant Herself	3rd place; season 10 Panelist and visit; season 11
2023	MasterChef Argentina	Contestant with Rodolfo	Guest; season 3
2024	Cantando 2024	Contestant with Lola	Guest; season 5
2026–present	MasterChef Celebrity Argentina	Contestant	TBA; season 5
2026	Popstars	Herself	Guest; season 3

=== Web ===
Year	Title	Role	Notes
2018–2019	Amor propio	Dominique Gales	Main role
2023	Fuera de Joda	Co-host	
2024	Zoom, acércate mas	Juli Po	Main role
2024–present	Rumis	Co-host	
2026	Después de Todos	Co-host	
2026–present	React Popstars	Co-host	Season 3

Videoclips

- Tranquila (2022) - María Becerra, FMK
- Mal Ahí (2023) - Florencia Vigna, DJ Alex
- La Morocha (2023) - Luck Ra, BM

== Theater ==
- El Principito: una aventura musical (2013-2014)
- El Principito: una aventura musical (2014)
- Giros, un baile con el destino (2017)
- El Gran Baile de la Luna Llena (2018)
- Mauo, un amigo espacial (2018)
- Amor Propio en el Teatro (2021-2022) as Dominique Gales (main role)
- Aven: Fuerza Bruta (2023) as himself (main cast)
- Coqueluche (2023) as Juanita (lead role)
- Camaleon Tour (2023) as himself (special guest)
- Noche Corta (2023) as himself (special guest)
- Zoom, acercate más (2024) as himself (lead role)
