= Gran Hermano (Argentine TV series) season 10 =

Gran Hermano
- Season 10
- Gran Hermano season 10 logo
- Presented by: Santiago del Moro
- No. of days: 162
- No. of housemates: 20
- Winner: Marcos Ginocchio
- Runner-up: Juan Ignacio Castañares
- No. of episodes: 49

Release
- Original network: Telefe
- Original release: 17 October 2022 – 27 March 2023

Season chronology
- ← Previous; Season 9 Next → Season 11

The tenth season of the Argentine version of the television reality show Gran Hermano was announced on 21 June 2022, by Telefe. After last airing on América TV in 2016, the show made its return to the original network Telefe, and it would be the first series to air in the network since the seventh season that aired during 2011–2012.

Santiago del Moro was formally announced as the show's new host. The show follows a group of contestants (known as HouseGuests), who live in a house together while being constantly filmed and having no communication with the outside world as they compete to win a grand prize of over ARS 15 million and a house. The runner-up also wins a house, and a vacation trip for two was given to the third place contestant. Each week, the HouseGuests compete in a Head of Household (HoH) competition which gives them immunity from nominations and the power to save one of the nominees up for eviction. On eviction night, the audience votes to evict one of the nominees.

The season premiered on 17 October 2022, and ran for 162 days, with the season ending on 27 March 2023.

Marcos Ginocchio was crowned the winner of the season, with Juan Ignacio Castañares finishing as runner-up and Julieta Poggio in third place.

On 26 March 2023, Gran Hermano was renewed by Telefe for an eleventh season to premiere in late 2023.

== Format ==
The show follows a group of contestants, known as HouseGuests, who live inside a custom-built house outfitted with cameras and microphones recording their every move 24 hours a day. The HouseGuests are sequestered with no contact with the outside world. During their stay, the HouseGuests share their thoughts on their day-to-day lives inside the house in a private room known as the Diary Room. Each week, the HouseGuests compete in competitions to win power and safety inside the house. At the start of each week, the HouseGuests compete in a Head of Household (abbreviated as "HOH") competition. The winner of the HoH competition is immune from eviction and selects another HouseGuest to be saved for eviction. On eviction night, the audience vote to evict one of the nominees, and the nominee with the most votes is evicted from the house.

== HouseGuests ==
A total of 18 HouseGuests moved into the house on Day 1 (17 October 2022), with the last two new HouseGuests moving into the house on Day 60 (15 December 2022). Former evicted HouseGuest Juliana Díaz returned to the house on Day 66 (21 December 2022), and other three evicted HouseGuests (Agustín, Daniela and Lucila) returned on Day 71 (26 December 2022).

Name	Age	Occupation	Residence	Day entered	Day exited	Status
Marcos Ginocchio	23	Law student	Salta, Salta	1	162	Winner
Juan Ignacio «Nacho» Castañares	20	Former footballer	Almagro, Buenos Aires	1	162	Runner-up
Julieta Poggio	20	Actress	Villa Devoto, Buenos Aires	1	162	Third place
Romina Uhrig	34	Former politician	Moreno, Buenos Aires	1	154	Evicted
Camila Lattanzio	21	Pianist	Ituzaingó, Buenos Aires	60	147	Evicted
Lucila Villar	28	NLP student	Berazategui, Buenos Aires	71	140	Evicted
Lucila Villar	28	NLP student	Berazategui, Buenos Aires	1	35	Evicted
Daniela Celis	26	Model	Moreno, Buenos Aires	71	126	Evicted
Daniela Celis	26	Model	Moreno, Buenos Aires	1	64	Evicted
Walter Santiago	60	Merchant	Tigre, Buenos Aires	1	119	Evicted
Ariel Ansaldo	45	Gridiron cook	Berazategui, Buenos Aires	60	112	Evicted
Agustín Guardis	25	Political analyst	La Plata, Buenos Aires	71	105	Evicted
Agustín Guardis	25	Political analyst	La Plata, Buenos Aires	1	56	Evicted
Maximiliano Giudici	35	Businessperson	Córdoba, Córdoba	1	98	Evicted
Thiago Medina	19	Central Market employee	González Catán, Buenos Aires	1	91	Evicted
Alexis Quiroga	29	Agriculturist	General Cabrera, Córdoba	1	85	Evicted
Constanza Romero	20	Kinesiology student	Caá Catí, Corrientes	1	77	Evicted
Juliana Díaz	31	Restaurant manager	Venado Tuerto, Santa Fe	66	71	Ejected
Juliana Díaz	31	Restaurant manager	Venado Tuerto, Santa Fe	1	42	Evicted
María Laura Álvarez	41	Dog groomer	Belén, Catamarca	1	49	Evicted
Juan Reverdito	41	Taxicab driver	San Salvador de Jujuy, Jujuy	1	28	Evicted
Mora Jabornisky	21	Civil engineer student	Posadas, Misiones	1	21	Evicted
Martina Stewart Usher	25	Gym teacher	Tigre, Buenos Aires	1	14	Evicted
Tomás Holder	21	TikToker	Rosario, Santa Fe	1	7	Evicted

=== Relatives ===
On Day 127 (20 February 2023), relatives from each one of the six remaining HouseGuests that were in competition at the time entered the house.

Name	Age	Occupation	Residence	Relationship	Day entered	Day exited	Status
Valentina Ginocchio	26	Spanish teacher	Salta, Salta	Marcos' sister	127	140	Winner
Rodolfo Castañares Pose	52	Actor	Montevideo, Uruguay	Nacho's father	127	140	Evicted
Gladys Lega	62	Housewife	Berazategui, Buenos Aires	Lucila's mother	127	134	Evicted
Camila Camarda	27	Community manager	Núñez, Buenos Aires	Julieta's half-sister	127	133	Evicted
Florencia Lattanzio	21	Footballer	Ituzaingó, Buenos Aires	Camila's twin sister	127	130	Evicted
Fabián Herrera	22	Auctioneer	Grand Bourg, Buenos Aires	Romina's nephew	127	129	Evicted

== Episodes ==
No. overall	No. in season	Title	Day(s)	Original release date	HH rating (Note: Audience averages are measured only in the Greater Buenos Aires area, according to data from Kantar Ibope Media.)
254	1	"Premiere"	Day 1	17 October 2022	21.5
Eighteen HouseGuests were presented to the public and entered the house on Day 1. It was announced that the four HouseGuests with the most votes will be nominated and eligible for eviction.
255	2	"1st Nomination Gala"	Days 1–3	19 October 2022	20.1
On Day 2, for the HoH competition, the HouseGuests had to find keys that were hidden and located in different parts of the house. The winners were Julieta, Nacho Martina, Juliana and Constanza, so they continued to the second part of the competition which consisted of opening a door of three padlocks, located in the game arena, using the keys previously found to grab a gold bar. Martina won the competition and became this week's Head of Household. On Day 3, Agustín, Marcos, Tomás and Walter were nominated for eviction.
256	3	"1st Eviction Gala"	Days 4–7	23 October 2022	19.5
Following the nomination ceremony, Martina chose to save Walter from eviction on Day 4, leaving Agustín, Marcos and Tomás up for eviction. For the first weekly test for the house's budget, HouseGuests in pairs had to maintain the water level between two established red marks of a container for 24 hours, while the water was in continuous descent supporting a toy boat. For the water level to not cross the lower mark, they had to pay attention and add water with a bucket when necessary (without exceeding the upper mark). The nine pairs of HouseGuests who took care of the container were at their choice and had to consist on mixed pairs. They were not able to move the boat or the cylinder. Martina, as HoH, finally chose the pairs who were: Martina and Juan, Mora and Nacho, Daniela and Thiago, Juliana and Maximiliano, Tomás and Romina, Alexis and Constanza, Agustín and Julieta, Walter and Lucila, and Marcos with María Laura. They ultimately lost the test and got half of the budget to go to the supermarket. Marcos was the first nominated HouseGuest saved from eviction receiving the fewest votes. After being faced against Agustín, Tomás was finally the first evicted from the house.
257	4	"2nd Nomination Gala"	Days 8–10	26 October 2022	17.9
On Day 9, the HoH competition was divided into two stages. First, two groups composed of nine and eight HouseGuests had to assemble a tower that exceeded three meters in height using multiple blocks. The fastest player who managed to keep the tower balanced after five seconds would become the winner. Finally the two winners of both groups (Maximiliano and Thiago) faced each other, with the same game, in a final challenge, with Maximiliano winning and becoming the week's HoH. On Day 10, Juan, Juan Ignacio, Martina and Walter had the most votes and were nominated. As punishment for discussing nominations, Juan, Nacho, and Martina's votes against Alexis and Constanza were nulled.
258	5	"2nd Eviction Gala"	Days 11–14	30 October 2022	18.6
On Day 11, Maximiliano chose to save Walter from eviction, leaving Juan, Juan Ignacio and Martina up for eviction. For the budget weekly test, in the game arena were 300 balloons with codes inside, with only one of them being the correct. They had to go from one HouseGuest at a time, explode a balloon and write down the code on a digital terminal. If they placed the correct code, they would win the test in less than 40 minutes, but they ended up losing the test and getting half of the budget for the supermarket. Martina was later evicted from the house after receiving the most votes from the audience.
259	6	"3rd Nomination Gala"	Days 15–17	2 November 2022	20.0
On Day 16, for the HoH competition, HouseGuests had to wind a rope from a giant reel upon their body, then they had to go to the other end and unwind the same rope from their body. The winners of each group (Lucila, Constanza, Romina and Daniela) faced each other in the final stage, in which Romina won and became the HoH. On Day 17, Agustín, Daniela, Juan, Mora and Walter had the most votes and were nominated.
260	7	"3rd Eviction Gala"	Days 18–21	6 November 2022	21.1
For the weekly budget competition, there were three light totems around the house that they had to maintain turned on. Each one of them had two buttons that had to be pressed in pairs, which were called by the sound of an alarm and through a screen in a random way. They had 10 seconds to identify the active totem pole and arrive to hold down the buttons until the light changed to blue when they were released. They lost the competition for the third consecutive week, getting half of the budget. Walter was the first nominated HouseGuest saved from eviction receiving the fewest votes, being followed by Agustín. After being faced against Juan, Mora was finally evicted from the house.
261	8	"4th Nomination Gala"	Days 22–24	9 November 2022	21.7
On Day 23, for the HoH competition, the HouseGuests had to melt columns of ice and take out a colored rod that was inside without using external elements, except their clothes. By becoming the first to do so, Lucila became the weekly HoH. On Day 24, Agustín, Daniela, Juan and Nacho had the most votes and were nominated. As punishment for discussing nominations, Juan, Juliana, and Lucila's votes against Constanza and Julieta were nulled, and after an uncomfortable situation with Constanza, Walter was automatically nominated.
262	9	"4th Eviction Gala"	Days 25–28	13 November 2022	21.3
On Day 25, the budget challenge consisted of two people pedaling in turns in a boat installed in the pool of the house for 24 hours, to cover the number of kilometers (69 km.) from Buenos Aires to Carmelo, Uruguay. This was the first challenge that the HouseGuests won, and received the full budget for the supermarket. On the same day, as punishment for removing her microphone voluntarily and whispering something in Juan's ear, Lucila lost her power as Head of Household to save one of the nominees. On Day 28, Agustín was the first HouseGuest saved from eviction by receiving the fewest votes, being followed by Nacho and later Daniela. After being faced against Walter, Juan was finally evicted from the house.
263	10	"5th Nomination Gala"	Days 29–31	16 November 2022	21.7
On Day 30, for the HoH competition, the HouseGuests in random pairs had to transport 10 balls, one at a time, through a stick that served as a balance, which went up and down depending on where they were standing. If any or all balls dropped, they had to repeat the process to replace the missing ones. The winners of each group (Romina with Daniela, and Alexis with Nacho) faced each other in the final stage, with Alexis and Nacho becoming both the Heads of Household. As punishment for discussing nominations, on Day 31, Alexis and Constanza's votes were nulled, and Juliana, Lucila, María Laura and Walter had the most votes and were nominated.
264	11	"5th Eviction Gala"	Days 32–35	20 November 2022	20.4
For the budget competition, on Day 32, the HouseGuests in pairs had to keep the level of corn in a silo as high as possible guided by a line that marked the level of corn, for 12 hours. They won the competition and received the full budget for the week. Alexis and Nacho chose to save María Laura from eviction. On Day 35, Walter was the first HouseGuest saved from eviction by receiving the fewest votes. After being faced against Juliana, Lucila was finally evicted from the house.
265	12	"6th Nomination Gala"	Days 36–38	23 November 2022	21.3
On Day 37, for the HoH competition, the HouseGuests individually had to make three goals in the shortest possible time, on a vertical platform, on which they had to level with two ropes a shelf that carried a ball to the upper hole. After the first part in which the participants passed one by one, the three finalists who took the least time (Maximiliano, Alexis and Thiago) went to the final of the challenge where the goal was to make the most goals on the platform in 5 minutes. With seven goals from the three HouseGuests, there was a three-way tie. They competed again and it was determined that the participant who scored a goal in the shortest possible time would win. Thiago finally won the competition. As punishment for discussing nominations during the previous week, Alexis and Constanza were able to nominate only one HouseGuest on Day 38, with Agustín, Juliana, María Laura, Nacho and Romina receiving the most votes and becoming nominated.
266	13	"6th Eviction Gala"	Days 39–42	27 November 2022	21.4
On Day 39, for the budget competition, the challenge was divided into three parts. In the courtyard of the house a volleyball court was delimited, and next to the drawn lines there were five buckets with a mark to which they had to arrive. One of the HouseGuests had to position himself on one side of the court, while the others lined up for the opposite sector. The HouseGuest who was alone had to throw a water balloon on the net, to which the others had to try to grab it and then deposit it in one of the buckets and try to fill them. After filling at least 13 buckets in total during the three phases, the HouseGuests finally won the competition. Thiago decided to save Romina from eviction, and on Day 42, Agustín and Nacho were the first HouseGuests saved from eviction by receiving the fewest votes. After being faced against María Laura, Juliana was finally evicted from the house.
267	14	"7th Nomination Gala"	Days 43–45	30 November 2022	19.3
On Day 44, for the HoH competition, the HouseGuests, in pairs, had to be placed on three small platforms, and keep the balance embraced and move from their platform to a higher one, and finally they stay balanced for as long as possible. With the winners being Maximiliano with Romina and Thiago with Agustín, they had to repeat the challenge but lifting one foot on the higher platform standing only by one leg. By leaning with the previously lifted foot, Agustín and Thiago were disqualified. Romina and Maximiliano repeated the challenge, with Romina becoming eventually the winner. On Day 45, as Romina became immune by winning the HoH competition, Maximiliano's votes against her were nulled, and Constanza, Daniela, María Laura, Nacho and Walter received the most votes, becoming nominated for eviction.
268	15	"7th Eviction Gala"	Days 46–49	4 December 2022	20.1
On Day 46, for the budget competition, the HouseGuests, divided into two groups, had to sit on top of a bed for twelve hours without moving, with only six HouseGuests being able to get out of bed at some point. Many of the HouseGuests abandoned the challenge, becoming a loss. Romina decided to save Constanza from eviction, and on Day 49, Walter and Nacho were the first HouseGuests saved from eviction by receiving the fewest votes. After being faced against Daniela, María Laura was finally evicted from the house.
269	16	"8th Nomination Gala"	Days 50–52	7 December 2022	18.6
On Day 51, for the HoH competition, the HouseGuests had to play sloping courses, in which they had to climb a ladder to drop a ball and run down the same ladder to prevent the ball from falling to the ground, repeating the same cycle. The finalists were Alexis, Nacho and Thiago, with Thiago becoming eventually the winner. On Day 52, Agustín, Julieta, Marcos, Maximiliano, Nacho and Romina became nominated for eviction after receiving the most votes by the HouseGuests.
270	17	"8th Eviction Gala"	Days 53–56	11 December 2022	22.2
On Day 53, for the budget competition, the HouseGuests had to stay awake for 48 hours with having only eight hours for sleep during this time. If the HouseGuests closed their eyes, it would count as sleeping time. The HouseGuests finally won the challenge, and Thiago saved Maximiliano from eviction. On Day 56, Marcos, Julieta and Romina were the first HouseGuests saved from eviction by receiving the fewest votes. After being faced against Nacho, Agustín was evicted from the house.
271	18	"9th Nomination Gala"	Days 57–59	14 December 2022	20.1
On Day 58, for the HoH competition, the HouseGuests had to catch boxes that were going down through a mechanical platform and stack them horizontally, using the body as support. Thiago won the competition for the second consecutive week. On Day 59, Alexis, Daniela, Julieta and Romina became nominated for eviction after receiving the most votes by the HouseGuests.
272	19	"HouseGuests Entry Gala"	Day 60	15 December 2022	21.6
Two new HouseGuests, Ariel and Camila, were presented to the public and entered the house. Thiago saved Alexis from eviction.
273	20	"9th Eviction Gala"	Days 60–64	19 December 2022 (Note: Originally scheduled to air on 18 December 2022. However, it was pre-empted for the 2022 FIFA World Cup final celebrations and rescheduled to 19 December.)	20.7
On Day 60, for the budget competition, the HouseGuests had to decorate and pack 200 pairs of shoes for nine hours, which were later donated to for children's foundations; they won the competition. On Day 64, Romina was the first HouseGuest saved from eviction by receiving the fewest votes. After being faced against Julieta, Daniela was evicted from the house.
274	21	"1st Re-Entry Gala"	Days 65–66	21 December 2022	20.8
On day 65, the HoH challenge consisted of making a tower with several kitchen elements on a very unstable base. Whoever managed to stack all the objects and answered a random question before the others, would pass the round. The finalists (Alexis, Marcos and Nacho) faced each other in the same way but this time instead of answering the final question they had to keep the tower stable for five seconds, with Alexis becoming the winner. On Day 66, the HouseGuests had to nominate an evicted HouseGuest to re-enter the house. Since it ended on a tie between Daniela and Juliana, Alexis (as HoH) had to break the tie and chose Juliana to re-enter the house on the same day.
275	22	"2nd Re-Entry Gala"	Days 67–71	26 December 2022	20.6
Since her re-entry, Juliana broke constanyly the rules regarding the isolation of the game and was warned by Gran Hermano several times. As punishment she was supposed to be automatically nominated and not able to nominate or participate for the HoH competition either. However, as she continued to break the rules, she was finally ejected of the house on Day 71. On the same day, the second repechage concluded with Daniela getting the most votes and re-entering the house. In second place, Agustín followed Daniela to re-enter the house. After Juliana's ejection, it was decided that one more ex-HouseGuest would re-enter by public vote; Lucila finally was the third most-voted and last to re-enter the house.
276	23	"10th Nomination Gala"	Days 72–73	28 December 2022	21.4
On Day 72, for the HoH competition, the HouseGuests had to circle around themselves 15 times trying to get dizzy, and then run to knock down four pins with bowling balls. Every time a wall appeared on the game platform that prevents shooting, they had to do the 15 rounds again. Since Thiago, Nacho, Marcos, Agustín and Alexis were finalists, they later faced each other with Thiago finally becoming the winner. On Day 74, Camila's votes were nulled after confessing to have used the Special Nomination. Because of this, the Special Nomination became available for its use again, which was used by Daniela. As Thiago became immune by winning the Head of Household competition, Daniela's votes against him were nulled. As punishment for sharing information from the outside into the house, Camila was also nominated by Gran Hermano and not able to vote. Ariel, Constanza, Daniela and Walter received the most votes and became nominated for eviction.
277	24	"10th Eviction Gala"	Days 74–77	1 January 2023	19.0
On Day 74, for the budget competition, the HouseGuests had to be kept intertwined by ropes in three groups of four people for 14 hours. Each group had a rope of different color and the composition of teams was solved by the lottery. The margin of error in removing the handcuffs either intentionally or involuntarily was only one; they won the competition. Thiago attempted to save Daniela from eviction but was nulled as punishment for discussing the salvation earlier. Finally, on Day 77, Camila, Walter and Daniela were the first HouseGuests saved from eviction by receiving the fewest votes. After being faced against Ariel, Constanza was finally evicted from the house.
278	25	"11th Nomination Gala"	Days 78–80	4 January 2023	21.1
On Day 79, for the HoH competition, the HouseGuests had to solve a puzzle in the least amount of time, with Nacho becoming the winner. On Day 80, Agustín, Alexis, Ariel and Lucila received the most votes and became nominated for eviction.
279	26	"11th Eviction Gala"	Days 81–85	9 January 2023	22.4
On Day 81, for the budget competition, the HouseGuests had to pair in duets to build a pyramid with 77 cards, and if the couples managed to build 7-storey pyramids they would win. After not being able to build them over an hour, they lost the competition, receiving half of the budget for the supermarket shopping. Nacho saved Daniela from eviction. On Day 85, Agustín was the first HouseGuest saved from eviction by receiving the fewest votes. After being faced against Ariel, Alexis was finally evicted from the house.
280	27	"12th Nomination Gala"	Days 86–87	11 January 2023	19.8
On Day 86, the HoH competition was mixed with the special Car Competition, in which the remaining HouseGuests that were in the house since the first day were the only able to participate. First, they had to be tied with a rope to the car for 12 hours; Thiago and Romina walked from the competition after a few hours. After this time, the finalists had to choose between 50 keys the one that would turn the car on; Maximiliano finally won the HoH competition and the car. On Day 87, Agustín, Camila, Nacho and Thiago received the most votes and became nominated for eviction.
281	28	"12th Eviction Gala"	Days 88–91	15 January 2023	20.9
On Day 88, for the budget competition, the HouseGuests had to keep a balloon full of air through a giant inflator, placed inside a hoop from falling to the ground; they won the competition. Maximiliano saved Nacho from eviction. On Day 91, Camila was the first HouseGuest saved from eviction by receiving the fewest votes. After being faced against Agustín, Thiago was finally evicted from the house.
282	29	"13th Nomination Gala"	Days 92–95	19 January 2023 (Note: Originally scheduled to air on 18 January 2023. However, it was pre-empted due to a television workers' union strike and rescheduled to 19 January.)	21.9
On Day 93, for the HoH competition, the HouseGuests had to transport five ping-pong balls through a semicircular structure from one end to the other, then slide the balls through two tubes and place them in small containers, with Marcos becoming the winner. On Day 95, for the budget competition, the HouseGuests had to form a path with planks through a 6-meter-long beam and slide a ball until it entered a basket located at the end of the beam; they lost the competition, receiving half of the budget for the supermarket shopping. On the same day, Agustín, Ariel, Nacho and Maximiliano received the most votes and became nominated for eviction, and Marcos chose to save Agustín from eviction.
283	30	"13th Eviction Gala"	Days 96–98	22 January 2023	20.3
On Day 98, Nacho was the first HouseGuest saved from eviction by receiving the fewest votes. After being faced against Ariel, Maximiliano was finally evicted from the house.
284	31	"14th Nomination Gala"	Days 99–101	25 January 2023	21.8
285	32	"14th Eviction Gala"	Days 102–105	29 January 2023	20.4
286	33	"15th Nomination Gala"	Days 106–108	1 February 2023	20.8
287	34	"15th Eviction Gala"	Days 109–112	5 February 2023	22.3
288	35	"16th Nomination Gala"	Days 113–115	8 February 2023	21.9
289	36	"16th Eviction Gala"	Days 116–119	12 February 2023	22.6
290	37	"17th Nomination Gala"	Days 120–122	15 February 2023	22.2
291	38	"17th Eviction Gala"	Days 123–126	19 February 2023	19.6
292	39	"Visitors Entry Gala"	Day 127	20 February 2023	20.1
293	40	"Visitors 1st Eviction Gala"	Days 128–129	22 February 2023	20.3
294	41	"Visitors 2nd Eviction Gala"	Days 130–133	26 February 2023	19.6
295	42	"18th Nomination Gala"	Days 134–136	1 March 2023	18.6
296	43	"18th Eviction Gala"	Days 137–140	5 March 2023	20.0
297	44	"19th Nomination Gala"	Days 141–143	8 March 2023	18.9
298	45	"19th Eviction Gala"	Days 144–147	12 March 2023	19.5
299	46	"20th Eviction Gala"	Days 148–154	19 March 2023	21.1
300	47	"Visitors Entry Gala #2"	Day 155	20 March 2023	22.9
301	48	"Special Gala"	Day 161	26 March 2023	20.2
302	49	"Final Gala"	Days 156–162 Various (Note: In the final episode, the HouseGuests that made it to the finale looked back over their time in the house. Flashbacks include clips from previous days in the house.)	27 March 2023	28.5
After 162 days, Marcos was crowned the winner of the season, with Nacho as the runner-up and Julieta in third place.

== Voting history ==
HouseGuests nominate for two and one points, shown in descending order in the nomination box. The four or more HouseGuests with the most nomination points face the public vote.

HouseGuests can also use the Diary Room's Special Nomination, which gives three and two points instead. HouseGuests that use the Special Nomination are marked in orange.

From Weeks 14 through 20, the Power Nomination (fulminante in Spanish) was enabled by Gran Hermano, which consists of the automatic nomination of a HouseGuest, without the ability to be saved by the Head of Household. It could only be used once by each contestant throughout those weeks. HouseGuests that use the Power Nomination are marked in bold.

	Week 1	Week 2	Week 3	Week 4	Week 5	Week 6	Week 7	Week 8	Week 9	Week 10		Week 11	Week 12	Week 13	Week 14	Week 15	Week 16	Week 17	Week 18	Week 19	Week 20	Week 21	Week 22	Week 23	Nomination points received
	Week 1	Week 2	Week 3	Week 4	Week 5	Week 6	Week 7	Week 8	Week 9	Day 66	Day 71	Week 11	Week 12	Week 13	Week 14	Week 15	Week 16	Week 17	Week 18	Week 19	Week 20	Week 21	Week 22	Finale	Nomination points received
Head(s) of Household	Martina	Maximiliano	Romina	Lucila	Alexis, Nacho	Thiago	Romina	Thiago	Thiago	Alexis	none	Thiago	Nacho	Maximiliano	Marcos	Marcos, Romina	Camila	Julieta	Romina	none	Marcos	Nacho	Marcos	none	Nomination points received
Marcos	Tomás, Nacho	Nacho; Juan	Juan, Nacho	María Laura, Juan	Lucila, María Laura	Nacho, María Laura	María Laura, Nacho	Nacho, Daniela	Nacho, Daniela	Agustín	No nominations	Nacho, Ariel	Lucila, Ariel	Lucila, Ariel	Nacho, Ariel	Lucila, Ariel	Nacho, Ariel	Lucila, Daniela	Lucila, Daniela	No nominations	Lucila, Camila	Julieta, Camila	Head of Household	**Winner** (Day 162)	30
Nacho	Walter, Marcos	~~Alexis,~~; ~~Constanza~~	Agustín, Daniela	Daniela, Julieta	Romina, Walter	Marcos, Juliana	Constanza, Daniela	Romina, Constanza	Daniela, Alexis	María Laura	No nominations	Constanza, Ariel	Camila, Agustín	Camila, Marcos	Ariel, Agustín	Daniela, Camila	Marcos, Julieta	Camila, Walter	Julieta, Daniela	No nominations	Romina, Julieta	Camila, Marcos	Nominated	**Runner-up** (Day 162)	74
Julieta	Juan, Tomás	Martina, Juan	Juan, Agustín	Juan, Nacho	Lucila, María Laura	Juliana, María Laura	Nacho, Maximiliano	Maximiliano, Agustín	Alexis, Maximiliano	Daniela	No nominations	Constanza, Agustín	Agustín, Alexis	Camila, Thiago	Maximiliano, Ariel	Agustín, Ariel	Ariel, Walter	Lucila, Walter	**Camila**	No nominations	Camila, Lucila	Camila, Marcos	Nominated	**Third place** (Day 162)	30
Romina	Tomás, Nacho	Martina, Nacho	Agustín, Nacho	Agustín, Nacho	Juliana, Maximiliano	Juliana, Agustín	Agustín, Nacho	Agustín, Maximiliano	Alexis, Maximiliano	Daniela	No nominations	Agustín, Constanza	Agustín, Ariel	Agustín, Nacho	Nacho, Agustín	Nacho, Agustín	Nacho, Ariel	Camila, ~~Walter~~	Nacho, Marcos	No nominations	Camila, Nacho	Camila, Marcos	Nominated	Evicted (Day 154)	33
Camila	Not in House								Exempt	Not eligible	No nominations	Banned	Lucila, Agustín	Thiago, Nacho	Lucila, Agustín	Lucila, Nacho	Nacho, Lucila	Lucila, Romina	Lucila, Daniela	No nominations	Romina, Julieta	Romina, Marcos	Evicted (Day 147)		36
Lucila	Tomás, Agustín	Nacho, Walter	Marcos, Agustín	~~Julieta,~~; ~~Constanza~~	Walter, Marcos	Evicted (Day 35)						Alexis, Ariel	Maximiliano, Alexis	Thiago, Camila	Ariel, Maximiliano	Camila, Ariel	Walter, Daniela	Camila, Walter	Daniela, Julieta	No nominations	Julieta, Camila	Re-Evicted (Day 140)			44
Daniela	Tomás, Walter	Juan, Walter	Walter, Agustín	Nacho, Juan	Maximiliano, Juliana	Nacho, María Laura	Nacho, Walter	Maximiliano, Agustín	Walter, Maximiliano	Evicted (Day 64)		Constanza, ~~Thiago~~	Alexis, Maximiliano	Agustín, Thiago	Maximiliano, Ariel	Agustín, Ariel	Ariel, Walter	Walter, Camila	Nacho, Lucila	Re-Evicted (Day 126)					53
Walter	Tomás, Juan	Juan, Nacho	Agustín, Lucila	Juan, María Laura	Lucila, María Laura	Juliana, Nacho	Daniela, Constanza	Maximiliano, Agustín	Daniela, Maximiliano	María Laura	No nominations	Ariel, Constanza	Ariel, Alexis	Ariel, Thiago	Ariel, Maximiliano	Ariel, Lucila	Ariel, Marcos	Romina, Lucila	Evicted (Day 119)						58
Ariel	Not in House								Exempt	Not eligible	No nominations	Walter, Nacho	Agustín, Marcos	Nacho, Walter	Julieta, Romina	Walter, Julieta	Julieta, Romina	Evicted (Day 112)							43
Agustín	Maria Laura, Juan	Juan, Mora	Mora, Daniela	Daniela, María Laura	María Laura, Lucila	Romina, Julieta	Daniela, María Laura	Romina, Nacho	Evicted (Day 56)			Daniela, Alexis	Alexis, Lucila	Camila, Thiago	Ariel, Maximiliano	Daniela, Julieta	Re-Evicted (Day 105)								69
Maximiliano	Walter, Romina	Martina, Nacho	Agustín, Daniela	Daniela, Agustín	Julieta, María Laura	Walter, Agustín	~~Romina,~~; Walter	Romina, Walter	Julieta, Romina	Juliana	No nominations	Daniela, Walter	Daniela, Ariel	Walter, Agustín	Daniela, Ariel	Evicted (Day 98)									29
Thiago	Walter, Agustín	Martina, Juan	Agustín, Walter	Juan, Agustín	Juliana, Lucila	María Laura, Juliana	Walter, Maximiliano	Romina, Walter	Romina, Constanza	Daniela	No nominations	Constanza, Alexis	Alexis, Ariel	Camila, Ariel	Evicted (Day 91)										9
Alexis	Walter, Agustín	Nacho, Martina	Daniela, Mora	Daniela, Nacho	~~Constanza,~~; ~~María Laura~~	(2) Romina	Nacho, María Laura	Julieta, Marcos	Romina, Nacho	(2) Juliana	No nominations	Daniela, Agustín	Daniela, Camila	Evicted (Day 85)											20
Constanza	Nacho, Juan	Nacho, Walter	Lucila, Mora	Marcos, Agustín	~~Lucila,~~; ~~María Laura~~	(2) Agustín	Nacho, María Laura	Marcos, Julieta	Julieta, Daniela	Banned	No nominations	Walter, Daniela	Evicted (Day 77)												24
Juliana	Marcos, Agustín	Martina, Juan	Daniela, Juan	~~Julieta,~~; ~~Constanza~~	Romina, Julieta	Nacho, Walter	Evicted (Day 42)				No nominations	Ejected (Day 71)													14
María Laura	Walter, Tomás	Juan, Walter	Agustín, Walter	Constanza, Julieta	Marcos, Walter	Constanza, Juliana	Constanza, Daniela	Evicted (Day 49)																	23
Juan	Marcos, Agustín	~~Constanza,~~; ~~Alexis~~	Agustín, Mora	~~Julieta,~~; ~~Constanza~~	Evicted (Day 28)																				30
Mora	Agustín, Walter	Nacho, Alexis	Agustín, Walter	Evicted (Day 21)																					7
Martina	Lucila, Marcos	~~Alexis,~~; ~~Constanza~~	Evicted (Day 14)																						11
Tomás	Constanza, Marcos	Evicted (Day 7)																							12
Notes	none	1	none	2, 3, 4	5	6	7	none		8, 9, 10, 11, 12, 13, 14		15, 16, 17, 18	none					19	none	20, 21	22	23	24	25	
Ejected	none										**Juliana**	none													
Nominated	Agustín, Marcos, Tomás, Walter	Juan, Martina, Nacho, Walter	Agustín, Daniela, Juan, Mora, Walter	Agustín, Daniela, Juan, Nacho, Walter	Juliana, Lucila, María Laura, Walter	Agustín, Juliana, María Laura, Nacho, Romina	Constanza, Daniela, María Laura, Nacho, Walter	Agustín, Julieta, Marcos, Maximiliano, Nacho, Romina	Alexis, Daniela, Julieta, Romina	Agustín, Daniela, Juan, Juliana, Lucila, María Laura, Martina, Mora	Agustín, Daniela, Juan, Lucila, María Laura, Martina, Mora, Tomás	Ariel, Camila, Constanza, Daniela, Walter	Agustín, Alexis, Ariel, Lucila	Agustín, Camila, Nacho, Thiago	Agustín, Ariel, Maximiliano, Nacho	Agustín, Ariel, Daniela, Lucila	Ariel, Julieta, Marcos, Nacho, Walter	Camila, Lucila, Romina, Walter	Camila, Daniela, Julieta, Lucila, Nacho	Camila C., Florencia, Gladys, Rodolfo, Valentina	Camila, Julieta, Lucila, Romina	Camila, Julieta, Marcos, Romina	Julieta, Romina, Nacho	Julieta, Marcos, Nacho	
Saved by HoH	Walter	Walter	Daniela	none	María Laura	Romina	Constanza	Maximiliano	Alexis	Juliana	none	~~Daniela~~	Lucila	Juan Ignacio	Agustín	Ariel	Walter	Camila	Julieta	none	Romina	none			
Against public vote	Agustín, Marcos, Tomás	Juan, Martina, Nacho	Agustín, Juan, Mora, Walter	Agustín, Daniela, Juan, Nacho, Walter	Juliana, Lucila, Walter	Agustín, María Laura, Nacho, Romina	Daniela, María Laura, Nacho, Walter	Agustín, Julieta, Marcos, Nacho, Romina	Daniela, Julieta, Romina	none	Agustín, Daniela, Juan, Lucila, María Laura, Martina, Mora, Tomás	Ariel, Camila, Constanza, Daniela, Walter	Agustín, Alexis, Ariel	Agustín, Camila, Thiago	Ariel, Maximiliano, Nacho	Agustín, Daniela, Lucila	Ariel, Julieta, Marcos, Nacho	Lucila, Romina, Walter	Camila, Daniela, Lucila, Nacho	Camila C., Florencia, Gladys, Rodolfo, Valentina	Camila, Julieta, Lucila	Camila, Julieta, Marcos, Romina	Julieta, Nacho, Romina	Julieta, Marcos, Nacho	
Evicted	**Tomás**; 59.40% to evict (out of 2)	**Martina**; 57.42% to evict	**Mora**; 60.07% to evict (out of 2)	**Juan**; 88.14% to evict (out of 2)	**Lucila**; 65.38% to evict (out of 2)	**Juliana**; 57.67% to evict (out of 2)	**María Laura**; 52.80% to evict (out of 2)	**Agustín**; 76.47% to evict (out of 2)	**Daniela**; 73.29% to evict (out of 2)	**Juliana**; 3 of 10 votes to return	**Daniela**; 40.98% to re-entry (out of 8)	**Constanza**; 67.35% to evict (out of 2)	**Alexis**; 56.19% to evict (out of 2)	**Thiago**; 52.90% to evict (out of 2)	**Maximiliano**; 52.02% to evict (out of 2)	**Agustín**; 50.81% to evict (out of 2)	**Ariel**; 55.21% to evict (out of 2)	**Walter**; 52.83% to evict (out of 2)	**Daniela**; 53.17% to evict (out of 2)	**Valentina**; 46.53% last visitor to evict (out of 2)	**Lucila**; 56.96% to evict (out of 2)	**Camila**; 60.26% to evict (out of 2)	**Romina**; 57.69% to evict (out of 2)	**Nacho**; 29.17% to win (out of 2)	
Evicted	**Tomás**; 59.40% to evict (out of 2)	**Martina**; 57.42% to evict	**Mora**; 60.07% to evict (out of 2)	**Juan**; 88.14% to evict (out of 2)	**Lucila**; 65.38% to evict (out of 2)	**Juliana**; 57.67% to evict (out of 2)	**María Laura**; 52.80% to evict (out of 2)	**Agustín**; 76.47% to evict (out of 2)	**Daniela**; 73.29% to evict (out of 2)	**Juliana**; 3 of 10 votes to return	**Agustín**; 47.15% to re-entry (out of 3)	**Constanza**; 67.35% to evict (out of 2)	**Alexis**; 56.19% to evict (out of 2)	**Thiago**; 52.90% to evict (out of 2)	**Maximiliano**; 52.02% to evict (out of 2)	**Agustín**; 50.81% to evict (out of 2)	**Ariel**; 55.21% to evict (out of 2)	**Walter**; 52.83% to evict (out of 2)	**Daniela**; 53.17% to evict (out of 2)	**Valentina**; 46.53% last visitor to evict (out of 2)	**Lucila**; 56.96% to evict (out of 2)	**Camila**; 60.26% to evict (out of 2)	**Romina**; 57.69% to evict (out of 2)	**Nacho**; 29.17% to win (out of 2)	
Evicted	**Tomás**; 59.40% to evict (out of 2)	**Martina**; 57.42% to evict	**Mora**; 60.07% to evict (out of 2)	**Juan**; 88.14% to evict (out of 2)	**Lucila**; 65.38% to evict (out of 2)	**Juliana**; 57.67% to evict (out of 2)	**María Laura**; 52.80% to evict (out of 2)	**Agustín**; 76.47% to evict (out of 2)	**Daniela**; 73.29% to evict (out of 2)	**Juliana**; 3 of 10 votes to return	**Lucila**; 68.76% to re-entry (out of 2)	**Constanza**; 67.35% to evict (out of 2)	**Alexis**; 56.19% to evict (out of 2)	**Thiago**; 52.90% to evict (out of 2)	**Maximiliano**; 52.02% to evict (out of 2)	**Agustín**; 50.81% to evict (out of 2)	**Ariel**; 55.21% to evict (out of 2)	**Walter**; 52.83% to evict (out of 2)	**Daniela**; 53.17% to evict (out of 2)	**Valentina**; 46.53% last visitor to evict (out of 2)	**Lucila**; 56.96% to evict (out of 2)	**Camila**; 60.26% to evict (out of 2)	**Romina**; 57.69% to evict (out of 2)	**Julieta**; 19.66% to win (out of 3)	
Saved	**Agustín**; 40.60% (out of 2); **Marcos**; 17.96% (out of 3)	**Juan**; 39.55; **Nacho** 3.03%	**Juan**; 39.93% (out of 2); **Agustín**; 9.93% (out of 3); **Walter**; 6.72% (out of 4)	**Walter**; 11.86% (out of 2); **Daniela**; 6.53% (out of 3); **Nacho**; 3.27% (out of 4); **Agustín**; 0.78% (out of 5)	**Juliana**; 34.62% (out of 2); **Walter**; 4.45% (out of 3)	**María Laura**; 42.33% (out of 2); **Nacho**; 8.86% (out of 3); **Agustín**; 5.7% (out of 4)	**Daniela**; 47.20% (out of 2); **Nacho**; 24.01% (out of 3); **Walter**; 3.17% (out of 4)	**Nacho**; 23.53% (out of 2); **Romina**; 6.42% (out of 3); **Julieta**; 5.78% (out of 4); **Marcos**; 1.08% (out of 5)	**Julieta**; 26.71% (out of 2); **Romina**; 7.97% (out of 3)			**Ariel**; 32.65% (out of 2); **Daniela**; 13.12% (out of 3); **Walter**; 5.55% (out of 4); **Camila**; 0.72% (out of 5)	**Ariel**; 43.81% (out of 2); **Agustín**; 15.80% (out of 3)	**Agustín**; 47.10% (out of 2); **Camila**; 7.82% (out of 3)	**Ariel**; 47.98% (out of 2)**Nacho**; 15.20% (out of 3)	**Daniela**; 49.19% (out of 2); **Lucila**; 3.38% (out of 3)	**Julieta**; 44.79% (out of 2); **Nacho**; 14.63% (out of 3); **Marcos**; 2.00% (out of 4)	**Romina**; 47.17% (out of 2); **Lucila**; 5.61% (out of 3)	**Camila**; 46.83% (out of 2); **Lucila**; 27.89% (out of 3); **Nacho**; 3.21% (out of 4)		**Camila**; 43.04% (out of 2); **Julieta**; 23.50% (out of 3)	**Romina**; 39.74% (out of 2); **Julieta**; 8.99% (out of 3); **Marcos**; 0.47% (out of 4)	**Nacho**; 42.31% (out of 2); **Julieta**; 11.37% (out of 3)	**Marcos**; 70.83% to win (out of 2)	

=== Notes ===
- **^1**: As punishment for discussing nominations, Juan, Martina and Nacho's votes against Alexis and Constanza were nulled.
- **^2**: As punishment for discussing nominations, Juan, Juliana and Lucila's votes against Constanza and Julieta were nulled.
- **^3**: As punishment for an uncomfortable situation with Constanza, Walter was automatically nominated.
- **^4**: As punishment for removing her microphone voluntarily and whispering something in Juan's ear, Lucila lost her power as Head of Household to save one of the nominees.
- **^5**: As punishment for discussing nominations, Alexis and Constanza's votes were nulled.
- **^6**: As punishment for discussing nominations during the previous week, Alexis and Constanza were only able to nominate one HouseGuest with 2 points.
- **^7**: As Romina became immune by winning the Head of Household competition, Maximiliano's votes against her were nulled.
- **^8**: During Week 10, both the nomination round and the eviction were not held. Instead, participating HouseGuests (except the newcomers Ariel and Camila) had to vote for an evicted HouseGuest to re-enter the house.
- **^9**: Alexis, as Head of Household, had the power to double his vote in the election for the re-entry of an evicted HouseGuest, and would cast a tiebreaking vote in the case of a tie.
- **^10**: As punishment for reading information thrown in from outside the house, Constanza was not able to vote.
- **^11**: With 3 votes each, Daniela and Juliana were tied. Alexis, as Head of Household, broke the tie and chose Juliana to re-enter the house.
- **^12**: After Juliana's re-entry, the public had to vote for two ex-HouseGuests to re-enter the house.
- **^13**: As punishment for sharing information from the outside into the house, Juliana was automatically nominated and was not able to nominate or participate in the HoH competition. However, as she continued to break the rules regarding the isolation of the game, she was ejected from the house on Day 71.
- **^14**: After Juliana's ejection, it was decided that one more ex-HouseGuest would re-enter by public vote.
- **^15**: After confessing to have used the Special Nomination, Camila's votes were nulled. Because of this, the Special Nomination became available for its use again.
- **^16**: As punishment for sharing information from the outside into the house, Camila was automatically nominated and was not able to vote.
- **^17**: As Thiago became immune by winning the Head of Household competition, Daniela's votes against him were nulled.
- **^18**: As punishment for discussing the salvation earlier, Thiago's choice of saving Daniela from being nominated was nulled.
- **^19**: As punishment for discussing nominations, Romina's vote against Walter was nulled.
- **^20**: On Week 19, both Special and Power Nominations were unavailable.
- **^21**: On Week 19, the nomination round was not held. Instead, participating HouseGuests and visitors had to vote to evict a loved one. The public then decided, on a daily basis, which of the remaining loved ones was evicted. The loved one with less votes earned the Head of Household title for their family member.
- **^22**: As the loved one with less votes, Valentina earned the Head of Household title for her brother Marcos.
- **^23**: On Week 21, the Head of Household was not able to save a nominee from eviction and only won immunity from nominations.
- **^24**: By winning the Head of Household competition, Marcos automatically became a finalist, leaving the remaining HouseGuests Julieta, Nacho and Romina nominated.
- **^25**: For the final week, the public were voting for the housemate they wanted to win, rather than evict.

== Production ==
=== Development ===
Gran Hermano 2022 is co-produced by production companies Kuarzo Entertainment Argentina and Banijay. The season was first confirmed on 21 June 2022. New host Santiago del Moro was also confirmed for the season. Casting for the season started on 21 June 2022, and concluded sometime around October 2022 with open-call auditions held for people between 18 and 101 years old. Applicants had to upload a presentation video and show their social networks.

=== Prize ===
The winner of the series, determined by the audience, wins ARS 15 million and a house, while the runner-up wins a house and a vacation trip for two was given to the third place contestant.

=== Production design ===
View from the courtyard of the house.

The house is located in a new location in Martínez, Buenos Aires. As with previous seasons, the house is outfitted with 65 cameras and 87 microphones. With over 2,500 square metres, it would become the biggest house ever of Gran Hermano Argentina, including 1,200 m^{2} indoors, 400 m^{2} outdoors, a supermarket, and the "arena" in which the HouseGuests are expected to compete for games and challenges.

== Release ==
=== Broadcast ===
The premiere of the tenth season of Gran Hermano was broadcast on Telefe on 17 October 2022. The telecast received a 21.46/65 rating/share, becoming the highest premiere of any show for the 2022 season in Argentina.

The season aired from Sundays through Fridays on Telefe, with nomination galas on Wednesdays, eviction galas on Sundays, debates on Mondays, Tuesdays and Thursdays, and a special edition called Night with the Exes (La Noche de los Ex in Spanish) with former HouseGuests from previous seasons on Fridays. The debates are joined by panelists Sol Pérez, Nati Jota, Laura Ubfal, Gastón Trezeguet, Ceferino Reato, Cristian Urrizaga and Analía Franchín, while the Night of the Exs being hosted by Roberto Funes Ugarte. Internationally, the season aired in simulcast in Uruguay on Canal 10.

=== Streaming services ===
Paramount's video streaming service Pluto TV was chosen to offer a 24-hour live feed of the house on channel 141.

Telefe aired in simulcast the season via YouTube and Twitch, hosted by Vicky "Juariu" Braier and Diego Poggi. The premiere of the tenth season the YouTube broadcasting reached 49,000 live users, while on Twitch the stream gained over 31,500 viewers.

== Reception ==
=== Ratings ===
Throughout its broadcast, in same-day viewership, the season averaged a 20.2 household rating. The finale was the most watched episode with a 28.5 HH rating.

No.	Title	Air date	Timeslot (ART)	HH rating
1	Premiere	17 October 2022	Monday 9:45 p.m.	21.5
2	1st Nomination Gala	19 October 2022	Wednesday 9:45 p.m.	20.1
3	1st Eviction Gala	23 October 2022	Sunday 10:15 p.m.	19.5
4	2nd Nomination Gala	26 October 2022	Wednesday 9:45 p.m.	17.9
5	2nd Eviction Gala	30 October 2022	Sunday 10:15 p.m.	18.6
6	3rd Nomination Gala	2 November 2022	Wednesday 9:45 p.m.	20.0
7	3rd Eviction Gala	6 November 2022	Sunday 10:15 p.m.	21.1
8	4th Nomination Gala	9 November 2022	Wednesday 9:45 p.m.	21.7
9	4th Eviction Gala	13 November 2022	Sunday 10:15 p.m.	21.3
10	5th Nomination Gala	16 November 2022	Wednesday 9:45 p.m.	21.7
11	5th Eviction Gala	20 November 2022	Sunday 10:15 p.m.	20.4
12	6th Nomination Gala	23 November 2022	Wednesday 9:45 p.m.	21.3
13	6th Eviction Gala	27 November 2022	Sunday 10:15 p.m.	21.4
14	7th Nomination Gala	30 November 2022	Wednesday 9:45 p.m.	19.3
15	7th Eviction Gala	4 December 2022	Sunday 10:15 p.m.	20.1
16	8th Nomination Gala	7 December 2022	Wednesday 9:45 p.m.	18.6
17	8th Eviction Gala	11 December 2022	Sunday 10:15 p.m.	22.2
18	9th Nomination Gala	14 December 2022	Wednesday 9:45 p.m.	20.1
19	HouseGuests Entry Gala	15 December 2022	Thursday 9:45 p.m.	21.6
20	9th Eviction Gala	19 December 2022	Monday 9:45 p.m.	20.7
21	1st Re-Entry Gala	21 December 2022	Wednesday 9:45 p.m.	20.8
22	2nd Re-Entry Gala	26 December 2022	Monday 9:45 p.m.	20.6
23	10th Nomination Gala	28 December 2022	Wednesday 9:45 p.m.	21.4
24	10th Eviction Gala	1 January 2023	Sunday 10:15 p.m.	19.0
25	11th Nomination Gala	4 January 2023	Wednesday 9:45 p.m.	21.1
26	11th Eviction Gala	9 January 2023	Monday 9:45 p.m.	22.4
27	12th Nomination Gala	11 January 2023	Wednesday 9:45 p.m.	19.8
28	12th Eviction Gala	15 January 2023	Sunday 10:15 p.m.	20.9
29	13th Nomination Gala	19 January 2023	Thursday 9:45 p.m.	21.9
30	13th Eviction Gala	22 January 2023	Sunday 10:15 p.m.	20.3
31	14th Nomination Gala	25 January 2023	Wednesday 9:45 p.m.	21.8
32	14th Eviction Gala	29 January 2023	Sunday 10:15 p.m.	20.4
33	15th Nomination Gala	1 February 2023	Wednesday 9:45 p.m.	20.8
34	15th Eviction Gala	5 February 2023	Sunday 10:15 p.m.	22.3
35	16th Nomination Gala	8 February 2023	Wednesday 9:45 p.m.	21.9
36	16th Eviction Gala	12 February 2023	Sunday 10:15 p.m.	22.6
37	17th Nomination Gala	15 February 2023	Wednesday 10:15 p.m.	22.2
38	17th Eviction Gala	19 February 2023	Sunday 10:15 p.m.	19.6
39	Visitors Entry Gala	20 February 2023	Monday 10:15 p.m.	20.1
40	Visitors 1st Eviction Gala	22 February 2023	Wednesday 10:15 p.m.	20.3
41	Visitors 2nd Eviction Gala	26 February 2023	Sunday 10:15 p.m.	19.6
42	18th Nomination Gala	1 March 2023	Wednesday 10:15 p.m.	18.6
43	18th Eviction Gala	5 March 2023	Sunday 10:15 p.m.	20.0
44	19th Nomination Gala	8 March 2023	Wednesday 10:15 p.m.	18.9
45	19th Eviction Gala	12 March 2023	Sunday 10:15 p.m.	19.5
46	20th Eviction Gala	19 March 2023	Sunday 10:15 p.m.	21.1
47	Visitors Entry Gala #2	20 March 2023	Monday 10:30 p.m.	22.9
48	Special Gala	26 March 2023	Sunday 10:30 p.m.	20.2
49	Final Gala	27 March 2023	Monday 10:30 p.m.	28.5

==== Debate episodes ====
No.	Title	Air date	Timeslot (ART)	HH rating
1	Debate No. 1	18 October 2022	Tuesday 9:45 p.m.	20.3
2	Debate No. 2	20 October 2022	Thursday 9:45 p.m.	19.5
3	Debate No. 3	24 October 2022	Monday 9:45 p.m.	18.8
4	Debate No. 4	25 October 2022	Tuesday 9:45 p.m.	17.9
5	Debate No. 5	27 October 2022	Thursday 9:45 p.m.	18.4
6	Debate No. 6	31 October 2022	Monday 9:45 p.m.	18.7
7	Debate No. 7	1 November 2022	Tuesday 9:45 p.m.	18.0
8	Debate No. 8	3 November 2022	Thursday 9:45 p.m.	18.8
9	Debate No. 9	7 November 2022	Monday 9:45 p.m.	20.2
10	Debate No. 10	8 November 2022	Tuesday 9:45 p.m.	20.0
11	Debate No. 11	10 November 2022	Thursday 9:45 p.m.	21.0
12	Debate No. 12	14 November 2022	Monday 9:45 p.m.	21.4
13	Debate No. 13	15 November 2022	Tuesday 9:45 p.m.	19.7
14	Debate No. 14	17 November 2022	Thursday 9:45 p.m.	21.3
15	Debate No. 15	21 November 2022	Monday 9:45 p.m.	19.5
16	Debate No. 16	22 November 2022	Tuesday 9:45 p.m.	20.3
17	Debate No. 17	24 November 2022	Thursday 9:45 p.m.	19.8
18	Debate No. 18	28 November 2022	Monday 9:45 p.m.	19.8
19	Debate No. 19	29 November 2022	Tuesday 9:45 p.m.	20.1
20	Debate No. 20	1 December 2022	Thursday 9:45 p.m.	20.2
21	Debate No. 21	5 December 2022	Monday 9:45 p.m.	18.5
22	Debate No. 22	6 December 2022	Tuesday 9:45 p.m.	18.2
23	Debate No. 23	8 December 2022	Thursday 9:45 p.m.	15.7
24	Debate No. 24	12 December 2022	Monday 9:45 p.m.	20.5
25	Debate No. 25	13 December 2022	Tuesday 9:45 p.m.	16.8
26	Debate No. 26	20 December 2022	Tuesday 9:45 p.m.	18.5
27	Debate No. 27	22 December 2022	Thursday 9:45 p.m.	17.6
28	Debate No. 28	27 December 2022	Tuesday 9:45 p.m.	20.4
29	Debate No. 29	29 December 2022	Thursday 9:45 p.m.	19.8
30	Debate No. 30	2 January 2023	Monday 9:45 p.m.	20.8
31	Debate No. 31	3 January 2023	Tuesday 9:45 p.m.	18.9
32	Debate No. 32	5 January 2023	Thursday 9:45 p.m.	18.6
33	Debate No. 33	8 January 2023	Sunday 10:15 p.m.	17.3
34	Debate No. 34	10 January 2023	Tuesday 9:45 p.m.	20.7
35	Debate No. 35	12 January 2023	Thursday 9:45 p.m.	20.3
36	Debate No. 36	16 January 2023	Monday 9:45 p.m.	21.8
37	Debate No. 37	17 January 2023	Tuesday 9:45 p.m.	19.7
38	Debate No. 38	18 January 2023	Wednesday 9:45 p.m.	20.1
39	Debate No. 39	23 January 2023	Monday 9:45 p.m.	19.2
40	Debate No. 40	24 January 2023	Tuesday 9:45 p.m.	19.9
41	Debate No. 41	26 January 2023	Thursday 9:45 p.m.	20.3
42	Debate No. 42	30 January 2023	Monday 9:45 p.m.	18.8
43	Debate No. 43	31 January 2023	Tuesday 9:45 p.m.	20.2
44	Debate No. 44	2 February 2023	Thursday 9:45 p.m.	21.4
45	Debate No. 45	6 February 2023	Monday 9:45 p.m.	19.7
46	Debate No. 46	7 February 2023	Tuesday 9:45 p.m.	19.9
47	Debate No. 47	9 February 2023	Thursday 9:45 p.m.	21.4
48	Debate No. 48	13 February 2023	Monday 10:15 p.m.	25.6
49	Debate No. 49	14 February 2023	Tuesday 10:15 p.m.	20.0
50	Debate No. 50	16 February 2023	Thursday 10:15 p.m.	21.6
51	Debate No. 51	21 February 2023	Tuesday 10:15 p.m.	19.7
52	Debate No. 52	23 February 2023	Thursday 10:15 p.m.	21.7
53	Debate No. 53	27 February 2023	Monday 10:15 p.m.	20.4
54	Debate No. 54	28 February 2023	Tuesday 10:15 p.m.	20.5
55	Debate No. 55	2 March 2023	Thursday 10:15 p.m.	19.9
56	Debate No. 56	6 March 2023	Monday 10:15 p.m.	18.4
57	Debate No. 57	7 March 2023	Tuesday 10:15 p.m.	22.7
58	Debate No. 58	9 March 2023	Thursday 10:15 p.m.	18.1
59	Debate No. 59	13 March 2023	Monday 10:15 p.m.	21.2
60	Debate No. 60	14 March 2023	Tuesday 10:15 p.m.	18.5
61	Debate No. 61	15 March 2023	Wednesday 10:15 p.m.	19.0
62	Debate No. 62	16 March 2023	Thursday 10:15 p.m.	19.1
63	Debate No. 63	21 March 2023	Tuesday 10:30 p.m.	20.5
64	Debate No. 64	22 March 2023	Wednesday 10:30 p.m.	18.9
65	Debate No. 65	24 March 2023	Friday 10:30 p.m.	18.3
66	The Final Debate	28 March 2023	Tuesday 9:30 p.m.	15.0

==== Night of the Exes episodes ====
No.	Title	Air date	Timeslot (ART)	HH rating
1	Night of the Exes No. 1	21 October 2022	Friday 9:45 p.m.	16.2
2	Night of the Exes No. 2	28 October 2022	Friday 9:45 p.m.	12.6
3	Night of the Exes No. 3	4 November 2022	Friday 9:45 p.m.	14.8
4	Night of the Exes No. 4	11 November 2022	Friday 9:45 p.m.	15.9
5	Night of the Exes No. 5	18 November 2022	Friday 9:45 p.m.	15.5
6	Night of the Exes No. 6	25 November 2022	Friday 9:45 p.m.	15.6
7	Night of the Exes No. 7	2 December 2022	Friday 9:45 p.m.	14.1
8	Night of the Exes No. 8	9 December 2022	Friday 9:45 p.m.	11.5
9	Night of the Exes No. 9	16 December 2022	Friday 9:45 p.m.	14.7
10	Night of the Exes No. 10	23 December 2022	Friday 9:45 p.m.	13.8
11	Night of the Exes No. 11	30 December 2022	Friday 9:45 p.m.	13.5
12	Night of the Exes No. 12	6 January 2023	Friday 9:45 p.m.	12.8
13	Night of the Exes No. 13	13 January 2023	Friday 9:45 p.m.	13.4
14	Night of the Exes No. 14	20 January 2023	Friday 9:45 p.m.	14.7
15	Night of the Exes No. 15	27 January 2023	Friday 9:45 p.m.	13.7
16	Night of the Exes No. 16	3 February 2023	Friday 9:45 p.m.	16.0
17	Night of the Exes No. 17	10 February 2023	Friday 9:45 p.m.	13.8
18	Night of the Exes No. 18	17 February 2023	Friday 9:45 p.m.	14.5
19	Night of the Exes No. 19	24 February 2023	Friday 9:45 p.m.	14.7
20	Night of the Exes No. 20	3 March 2023	Friday 9:45 p.m.	13.8
21	Night of the Exes No. 21	10 March 2023	Friday 9:45 p.m.	13.3
22	Night of the Exes No. 22	17 March 2023	Friday 9:45 p.m.	12.3
23	Night of the Exes No. 23	23 March 2023	Thursday 10:30 p.m.	7.3

==== Pluto TV Presents: Spying the House episodes ====
===== Episodes 1–100 =====
No.	Title	Air date	Timeslot (ART)	HH rating
1	Spying the House No. 1	18 October 2022	Tuesday 12:00 a.m.	19.3
2	Spying the House No. 2	18 October 2022	Tuesday 11:30 p.m.	16.7
3	Spying the House No. 3	19 October 2022	Wednesday 11:30 p.m.	17.9
4	Spying the House No. 4	20 October 2022	Thursday 11:30 p.m.	15.8
5	Spying the House No. 5	21 October 2022	Friday 11:30 p.m.	15.2
6	Spying the House No. 6	23 October 2022	Sunday 12:00 a.m.	6.8
7	Spying the House No. 7	24 October 2022	Monday 12:00 a.m.	12.8
8	Spying the House No. 8	24 October 2022	Monday 11:30 p.m.	14.2
9	Spying the House No. 9	25 October 2022	Tuesday 11:30 p.m.	12.9
10	Spying the House No. 10	26 October 2022	Wednesday 11:30 p.m.	16.6
11	Spying the House No. 11	27 October 2022	Thursday 11:30 p.m.	14.7
12	Spying the House No. 12	28 October 2022	Friday 11:00 p.m.	11.6
13	Spying the House No. 13	30 October 2022	Sunday 12:00 a.m.	5.1
14	Spying the House No. 14	30 October 2022	Sunday 4:30 p.m.	7.3
15	Spying the House No. 15	31 October 2022	Monday 11:30 p.m.	13.2
16	Spying the House No. 16	1 November 2022	Tuesday 11:30 p.m.	12.0
17	Spying the House No. 17	2 November 2022	Wednesday 11:30 p.m.	13.3
18	Spying the House No. 18	3 November 2022	Thursday 11:30 p.m.	12.7
19	Spying the House No. 19	4 November 2022	Friday 11:00 p.m.	11.3
20	Spying the House No. 20	6 November 2022	Sunday 12:00 a.m.	8.0
21	Spying the House No. 21	6 November 2022	Sunday 4:30 p.m.	4.8
22	Spying the House No. 22	7 November 2022	Monday 11:30 p.m.	13.6
23	Spying the House No. 23	8 November 2022	Tuesday 11:30 p.m.	11.9
24	Spying the House No. 24	9 November 2022	Wednesday 11:30 p.m.	13.8
25	Spying the House No. 25	10 November 2022	Thursday 11:30 p.m.	12.7
26	Spying the House No. 26	11 November 2022	Friday 11:30 p.m.	10.8
27	Spying the House No. 27	13 November 2022	Sunday 12:00 a.m.	5.8
28	Spying the House No. 28	13 November 2022	Sunday 4:30 p.m.	5.6
29	Spying the House No. 29	14 November 2022	Monday 11:30 p.m.	12.4
30	Spying the House No. 30	15 November 2022	Tuesday 11:30 p.m.	13.4
31	Spying the House No. 31	16 November 2022	Wednesday 11:30 p.m.	14.7
32	Spying the House No. 32	17 November 2022	Thursday 11:30 p.m.	15.1
33	Spying the House No. 33	18 November 2022	Friday 11:30 p.m.	10.5
34	Spying the House No. 34	20 November 2022	Sunday 12:00 a.m.	5.9
35	Spying the House No. 35	20 November 2022	Sunday 4:30 p.m.	5.2
36	Spying the House No. 36	21 November 2022	Monday 12:00 a.m.	13.7
37	Spying the House No. 37	21 November 2022	Monday 11:30 p.m.	11.7
38	Spying the House No. 38	22 November 2022	Tuesday 11:30 p.m.	11.8
39	Spying the House No. 39	23 November 2022	Wednesday 11:30 p.m.	12.9
40	Spying the House No. 40	24 November 2022	Thursday 11:30 p.m.	12.1
41	Spying the House No. 41	25 November 2022	Friday 11:30 p.m.	12.4
42	Spying the House No. 42	27 November 2022	Sunday 12:00 a.m.	4.6
43	Spying the House No. 43	27 November 2022	Sunday 4:30 p.m.	—N/a
44	Spying the House No. 44	28 November 2022	Monday 12:00 a.m.	13.1
45	Spying the House No. 45	28 November 2022	Monday 11:30 p.m.	11.7
46	Spying the House No. 46	29 November 2022	Tuesday 11:30 p.m.	13.1
47	Spying the House No. 47	30 November 2022	Wednesday 11:30 p.m.	12.3
48	Spying the House No. 48	1 December 2022	Thursday 11:30 p.m.	14.0
49	Spying the House No. 49	2 December 2022	Friday 11:30 p.m.	10.0
50	Spying the House No. 50	4 December 2022	Sunday 4:30 p.m.	3.3
51	Spying the House No. 51	5 December 2022	Monday 12:00 a.m.	13.5
52	Spying the House No. 52	5 December 2022	Monday 11:30 p.m.	12.9
53	Spying the House No. 53	6 December 2022	Tuesday 11:30 p.m.	12.4
54	Spying the House No. 54	7 December 2022	Wednesday 11:30 p.m.	12.8
55	Spying the House No. 55	8 December 2022	Thursday 11:30 p.m.	11.1
56	Spying the House No. 56	9 December 2022	Friday 11:30 p.m.	7.9
57	Spying the House No. 57	11 December 2022	Sunday 4:30 p.m.	4.7
58	Spying the House No. 58	12 December 2022	Monday 12:00 a.m.	14.5
59	Spying the House No. 59	12 December 2022	Monday 11:30 p.m.	12.4
60	Spying the House No. 60	13 December 2022	Tuesday 11:30 p.m.	10.1
61	Spying the House No. 61	14 December 2022	Wednesday 11:30 p.m.	13.2
62	Spying the House No. 62	15 December 2022	Thursday 11:30 p.m.	13.4
63	Spying the House No. 63	16 December 2022	Friday 11:30 p.m.	9.5
64	Spying the House No. 64	18 December 2022	Sunday 12:00 a.m.	5.8
65	Spying the House No. 65	18 December 2022	Sunday 4:30 p.m.	0.7
66	Spying the House No. 66	19 December 2022	Monday 12:00 a.m.	7.6
67	Spying the House No. 67	19 December 2022	Monday 11:30 p.m.	15.3
68	Spying the House No. 68	20 December 2022	Tuesday 11:30 p.m.	11.0
69	Spying the House No. 69	21 December 2022	Wednesday 4:20 p.m.	7.4
70	Spying the House No. 70	21 December 2022	Wednesday 11:30 p.m.	14.5
71	Spying the House No. 71	22 December 2022	Thursday 4:20 p.m.	7.2
72	Spying the House No. 72	22 December 2022	Thursday 11:30 p.m.	13.3
73	Spying the House No. 73	23 December 2022	Friday 4:20 p.m.	7.9
74	Spying the House No. 74	23 December 2022	Friday 11:30 p.m.	9.8
75	Toasting with the House No. 1	24 December 2022	Saturday 11:15 p.m.	4.4
76	Spying the House No. 75	25 December 2022	Sunday 4:15 p.m.	4.2
76	Spying the House No. 75	26 December 2022	Monday 12:00 a.m.	4.8
77	Spying the House No. 76	26 December 2022	Monday 4:20 p.m.	8.3
78	Spying the House No. 77	26 December 2022	Monday 11:30 p.m.	17.2
79	Spying the House No. 78	27 December 2022	Tuesday 4:20 p.m.	9.6
80	Spying the House No. 79	27 December 2022	Tuesday 11:30 p.m.	15.6
81	Spying the House No. 80	28 December 2022	Wednesday 4:20 p.m.	9.0
82	Spying the House No. 81	28 December 2022	Wednesday 11:30 p.m.	16.9
83	Spying the House No. 82	29 December 2022	Thursday 4:20 p.m.	9.6
84	Spying the House No. 83	29 December 2022	Thursday 11:30 p.m.	15.2
85	Spying the House No. 84	30 December 2022	Friday 4:20 p.m.	7.7
86	Spying the House No. 85	30 December 2022	Friday 11:30 p.m.	10.2
87	Toasting with the House No. 2	31 December 2022	Saturday 10:15 p.m.	—N/a
88	Spying the House No. 86	1 January 2023	Sunday 6:00 p.m.	5.8
89	Spying the House No. 87	2 January 2023	Monday 12:00 a.m.	14.2
90	Spying the House No. 88	2 January 2023	Monday 4:15 p.m.	10.0
91	Spying the House No. 89	2 January 2023	Monday 11:30 p.m.	14.9
92	Spying the House No. 90	3 January 2023	Tuesday 4:15 p.m.	9.5
93	Spying the House No. 91	3 January 2023	Tuesday 11:30 p.m.	11.7
94	Spying the House No. 92	4 January 2023	Wednesday 4:15 p.m.	9.6
95	Spying the House No. 93	4 January 2023	Wednesday 11:30 p.m.	15.2
96	Spying the House No. 94	5 January 2023	Thursday 4:15 p.m.	7.8
97	Spying the House No. 95	5 January 2023	Thursday 11:30 p.m.	13.7
98	Spying the House No. 96	6 January 2023	Friday 4:15 p.m.	8.1
99	Spying the House No. 97	6 January 2023	Friday 11:30 p.m.	10.5
100	Spying the House No. 98	7 January 2023	Saturday 10:30 p.m.	7.2

===== Episodes 101–200 =====
No.	Title	Air date	Timeslot (ART)	HH rating
101	Spying the House No. 99	9 January 2023	Monday 12:00 a.m.	11.7
102	Spying the House No. 100	9 January 2023	Monday 4:15 p.m.	9.8
103	Spying the House No. 101	10 January 2023	Tuesday 12:00 a.m.	15.9
104	Spying the House No. 102	10 January 2023	Tuesday 4:15 p.m.	10.1
105	Spying the House No. 103	11 January 2023	Wednesday 12:00 a.m.	12.0
106	Spying the House No. 104	11 January 2023	Wednesday 4:15 p.m.	10.3
107	Spying the House No. 105	12 January 2023	Thursday 12:00 a.m.	12.8
108	Spying the House No. 106	12 January 2023	Thursday 4:15 p.m.	10.6
109	Spying the House No. 107	13 January 2023	Friday 12:00 a.m.	12.9
110	Spying the House No. 108	13 January 2023	Friday 4:15 p.m.	9.0
111	Spying the House No. 109	13 January 2023	Friday 11:30 p.m.	8.9
112	Spying the House No. 110	14 January 2023	Saturday 10:30 p.m.	8.5
113	Spying the House No. 111	16 January 2023	Monday 12:00 a.m.	16.9
114	Spying the House No. 112	16 January 2023	Monday 4:15 p.m.	9.6
115	Spying the House No. 113	16 January 2023	Monday 11:45 p.m.	15.9
116	Spying the House No. 114	17 January 2023	Tuesday 4:15 p.m.	9.9
117	Spying the House No. 115	17 January 2023	Tuesday 11:45 p.m.	14.5
118	Spying the House No. 116	18 January 2023	Wednesday 4:15 p.m.	9.9
119	Spying the House No. 117	18 January 2023	Wednesday 11:45 p.m.	12.4
120	Spying the House No. 118	19 January 2023	Thursday 4:15 p.m.	10.0
121	Spying the House No. 119	19 January 2023	Thursday 11:45 p.m.	16.2
122	Spying the House No. 120	20 January 2023	Friday 4:15 p.m.	11.4
123	Spying the House No. 121	20 January 2023	Friday 11:45 p.m.	9.1
124	Spying the House No. 122	21 January 2023	Saturday 10:30 p.m.	7.6
125	Spying the House No. 123	23 January 2023	Monday 12:00 a.m.	14.9
126	Spying the House No. 124	23 January 2023	Monday 4:15 p.m.	10.9
127	Spying the House No. 125	23 January 2023	Monday 11:45 p.m.	14.3
128	Spying the House No. 126	24 January 2023	Tuesday 4:15 p.m.	10.1
129	Spying the House No. 127	24 January 2023	Tuesday 11:45 p.m.	11.8
130	Spying the House No. 128	25 January 2023	Wednesday 4:15 p.m.	8.8
131	Spying the House No. 129	25 January 2023	Wednesday 11:45 p.m.	14.1
132	Spying the House No. 130	26 January 2023	Thursday 4:15 p.m.	9.3
133	Spying the House No. 131	26 January 2023	Thursday 11:45 p.m.	14.3
134	Spying the House No. 132	27 January 2023	Friday 4:15 p.m.	10.3
135	Spying the House No. 133	27 January 2023	Friday 11:45 p.m.	9.8
136	Spying the House No. 134	28 January 2023	Saturday 10:30 p.m.	8.0
137	Spying the House No. 135	30 January 2023	Monday 12:00 a.m.	14.3
138	Spying the House No. 136	30 January 2023	Monday 4:15 p.m.	10.3
139	Spying the House No. 137	30 January 2023	Monday 11:45 p.m.	12.8
140	Spying the House No. 138	31 January 2023	Tuesday 4:15 p.m.	10.3
141	Spying the House No. 139	31 January 2023	Tuesday 11:45 p.m.	12.5
142	Spying the House No. 140	1 February 2023	Wednesday 4:15 p.m.	9.7
143	Spying the House No. 141	1 February 2023	Wednesday 11:45 p.m.	13.9
144	Spying the House No. 142	2 February 2023	Thursday 4:15 p.m.	10.3
145	Spying the House No. 143	2 February 2023	Thursday 11:45 p.m.	16.5
146	Spying the House No. 144	3 February 2023	Friday 4:15 p.m.	10.3
147	Spying the House No. 145	3 February 2023	Friday 11:45 p.m.	11.4
148	Spying the House No. 146	4 February 2023	Saturday 10:30 p.m.	8.5
149	Spying the House No. 147	6 February 2023	Monday 12:00 a.m.	15.1
150	Spying the House No. 148	6 February 2023	Monday 4:15 p.m.	10.1
151	Spying the House No. 149	6 February 2023	Monday 11:30 p.m.	12.5
152	Spying the House No. 150	7 February 2023	Tuesday 4:15 p.m.	9.9
153	Spying the House No. 151	7 February 2023	Tuesday 11:30 p.m.	14.5
154	Spying the House No. 152	8 February 2023	Wednesday 4:15 p.m.	9.0
155	Spying the House No. 153	8 February 2023	Wednesday 11:30 p.m.	16.5
156	Spying the House No. 154	9 February 2023	Thursday 4:15 p.m.	9.6
157	Spying the House No. 155	9 February 2023	Thursday 11:30 p.m.	16.4
158	Spying the House No. 156	10 February 2023	Friday 4:15 p.m.	9.7
159	Spying the House No. 157	10 February 2023	Friday 11:30 p.m.	9.9
160	Spying the House No. 158	11 February 2023	Saturday 10:00 p.m.	8.0
161	Spying the House No. 159	13 February 2023	Monday 12:00 a.m.	17.9
162	Spying the House No. 160	13 February 2023	Monday 4:15 p.m.	10.8
163	Spying the House No. 161	13 February 2023	Monday 11:45 p.m.	15.9
164	Spying the House No. 162	14 February 2023	Tuesday 4:15 p.m.	10.8
165	Spying the House No. 163	14 February 2023	Tuesday 11:45 p.m.	14.3
166	Spying the House No. 164	15 February 2023	Wednesday 4:15 p.m.	10.3
167	Spying the House No. 165	15 February 2023	Wednesday 11:45 p.m.	15.0
168	Spying the House No. 166	16 February 2023	Thursday 4:15 p.m.	8.8
169	Spying the House No. 167	16 February 2023	Thursday 11:45 p.m.	14.9
170	Spying the House No. 168	17 February 2023	Friday 4:15 p.m.	10.3
171	Spying the House No. 169	17 February 2023	Friday 11:45 p.m.	9.4
172	Spying the House No. 170	18 February 2023	Saturday 10:00 p.m.	9.9
173	Spying the House No. 171	20 February 2023	Monday 12:00 a.m.	14.1
174	Spying the House No. 172	20 February 2023	Monday 4:15 p.m.	8.9
175	Spying the House No. 173	20 February 2023	Monday 11:45 p.m.	14.3
176	Spying the House No. 174	21 February 2023	Tuesday 4:15 p.m.	9.5
177	Spying the House No. 175	21 February 2023	Tuesday 11:45 p.m.	13.2
178	Spying the House No. 176	22 February 2023	Wednesday 4:15 p.m.	8.8
179	Spying the House No. 177	22 February 2023	Wednesday 11:45 p.m.	14.5
180	Spying the House No. 178	23 February 2023	Thursday 4:15 p.m.	10.0
181	Spying the House No. 179	23 February 2023	Thursday 11:45 p.m.	14.4
182	Spying the House No. 180	24 February 2023	Friday 4:15 p.m.	8.2
183	Spying the House No. 181	24 February 2023	Friday 11:45 p.m.	11.3
184	Spying the House No. 182	25 February 2023	Saturday 10:30 p.m.	8.7
185	Spying the House No. 183	27 February 2023	Monday 12:00 a.m.	13.2
186	Spying the House No. 184	27 February 2023	Monday 4:15 p.m.	9.4
187	Spying the House No. 185	27 February 2023	Monday 11:45 p.m.	13.6
188	Spying the House No. 186	28 February 2023	Tuesday 4:15 p.m.	9.4
189	Spying the House No. 187	28 February 2023	Tuesday 11:45 p.m.	12.7
190	Spying the House No. 188	1 March 2023	Wednesday 4:15 p.m.	4.1
191	Spying the House No. 189	1 March 2023	Wednesday 11:45 p.m.	11.3
192	Spying the House No. 190	2 March 2023	Thursday 4:15 p.m.	8.2
193	Spying the House No. 191	2 March 2023	Thursday 11:45 p.m.	15.1
194	Spying the House No. 192	3 March 2023	Friday 4:15 p.m.	9.2
195	Spying the House No. 193	3 March 2023	Friday 11:45 p.m.	9.3
196	Spying the House No. 194	4 March 2023	Saturday 10:30 p.m.	7.6
197	Spying the House No. 195	6 March 2023	Monday 12:00 a.m.	13.4
198	Spying the House No. 196	6 March 2023	Monday 4:15 p.m.	8.9
199	Spying the House No. 197	6 March 2023	Monday 11:45 p.m.	11.8
200	Spying the House No. 198	7 March 2023	Tuesday 4:15 p.m.	8.2

===== Episodes 201–240 =====
No.	Title	Air date	Timeslot (ART)	HH rating
201	Spying the House No. 199	7 March 2023	Tuesday 11:45 p.m.	14.3
202	Spying the House No. 200	8 March 2023	Wednesday 4:15 p.m.	8.0
203	Spying the House No. 201	8 March 2023	Wednesday 9:45 p.m.	12.9
204	Spying the House No. 202	8 March 2023	Wednesday 11:45 p.m.	9.9
205	Spying the House No. 203	9 March 2023	Thursday 4:15 p.m.	8.6
206	Spying the House No. 204	9 March 2023	Thursday 9:45 p.m.	14.0
207	Spying the House No. 205	9 March 2023	Thursday 11:45 p.m.	11.7
208	Spying the House No. 206	10 March 2023	Friday 4:15 p.m.	8.6
209	Spying the House No. 207	10 March 2023	Friday 11:45 p.m.	9.2
210	Spying the House No. 208	11 March 2023	Saturday 10:30 p.m.	7.7
211	Spying the House No. 209	13 March 2023	Monday 12:00 a.m.	12.6
212	Spying the House No. 210	13 March 2023	Monday 4:15 p.m.	8.5
213	Spying the House No. 211	13 March 2023	Monday 9:45 p.m.	15.2
214	Spying the House No. 212	13 March 2023	Monday 11:45 p.m.	14.1
215	Spying the House No. 213	14 March 2023	Tuesday 4:15 p.m.	9.0
216	Spying the House No. 214	14 March 2023	Tuesday 9:45 p.m.	15.1
217	Spying the House No. 215	14 March 2023	Tuesday 11:45 p.m.	10.9
218	Spying the House No. 216	15 March 2023	Wednesday 4:15 p.m.	8.5
219	Spying the House No. 217	15 March 2023	Wednesday 9:45 p.m.	13.5
220	Spying the House No. 218	15 March 2023	Wednesday 11:45 p.m.	12.2
221	Spying the House No. 219	16 March 2023	Thursday 4:15 p.m.	7.9
222	Spying the House No. 220	16 March 2023	Thursday 9:45 p.m.	13.8
223	Spying the House No. 221	16 March 2023	Thursday 11:45 p.m.	11.3
224	Spying the House No. 222	17 March 2023	Friday 4:15 p.m.	8.6
225	Spying the House No. 223	17 March 2023	Friday 11:45 p.m.	8.0
226	Spying the House No. 224	18 March 2023	Saturday 10:00 p.m.	7.2
227	Spying the House No. 225	20 March 2023	Monday 12:00 a.m.	13.1
228	Spying the House No. 226	20 March 2023	Monday 4:15 p.m.	8.5
229	Spying the House No. 227	20 March 2023	Monday 11:45 p.m.	12.4
230	Spying the House No. 228	21 March 2023	Tuesday 4:15 p.m.	8.7
231	Spying the House No. 229	21 March 2023	Tuesday 11:45 p.m.	10.5
232	Spying the House No. 230	22 March 2023	Wednesday 4:15 p.m.	8.9
233	Spying the House No. 231	22 March 2023	Wednesday 11:45 p.m.	11.0
234	Spying the House No. 232	23 March 2023	Thursday 4:15 p.m.	8.2
235	Spying the House No. 233	23 March 2023	Thursday 11:45 p.m.	7.9
236	Spying the House No. 234	24 March 2023	Friday 4:15 p.m.	8.3
237	Spying the House No. 235	24 March 2023	Friday 11:45 p.m.	14.3
238	Spying the House No. 236	25 March 2023	Saturday 10:00 p.m.	6.9
239	Spying the House No. 237	27 March 2023	Monday 12:00 a.m.	11.5
240	Spying the House No. 238	27 March 2023	Monday 4:15 p.m.	8.7
