= Marcos Ginocchio =

Argentine reality television personality and model

- Born: October 16, 1999 (age 26); Salta, Salta Province, Argentina
- Occupation: Model
- Years active: 2022–present
- Modeling information
- Height: 6 ft 1.2 in (1.86 m)
- Hair color: Brown
- Eye color: Green
- Agency: Multitalent (Buenos Aires)

Marcos Ginocchio (born October 16, 1999) is an Argentine model, lawyer and TV personality. He won the 10th season of the Argentine reality television series Gran Hermano.

== Early life ==
Ginocchio was born in Salta, to architect José Ginocchio and Carola Moraiz. He has an older sister, Valentina, and an older brother, José. His parents separated when he was 10 years old. As a kid, Ginocchio practiced kickboxing, taekwondo and jiu-jitsu. In elementary school he attended the Belgrano School and in high school the Del Milagro School both in Salta.

After graduating in 2017, Ginocchio attended the Catholic University of Salta to study law. In 2019, he became national jiu jitsu champion in the shiakan category in a professional tournament held in Mar del Plata. In the same time, he worked as male model in Salta for different local brands and he did a campaign for a beer brand in Mexico.

== Career ==
=== 2022-present: Gran Hermano and modelling ===
On October 17, 2022, Ginocchio entered as one of the contestants of the argentinian reality show Gran Hermano. In the first week, he was nominated and was safe from elimination after landing the 17.96% of the votes, being the least voted to leave the house. Ginocchio became one of the favorites of the show after facing of his opponents, for having a calm personality, being kind and not at all confrontational. He passed another three eviction galas and won four Head of Household competition, including the last one that took him directly to the final, where he was established as the winner with 70.83% of the positive votes by the public.

Ginocchio was awarded the $19.441.132 grand prize, a house and one year of free beer. During his time in the house, he won two electric motorcycles by the public vote.

After Gran Hermano, he signed with the modelling and acting agency Multitalent. Ginocchio was on the cover of several magazines, including Gente, Para Ti and Caras. He was also the face of the shoes brand's Sarkany.

== Personal life ==
In his childhood, Ginocchio suffered from eating disorders.

== Television ==
Year	Title	Role	Notes
2022–2023	Gran Hermano	Contestant	Winner (season 10)
2023	MasterChef Argentina	Delfina's assistant	Special guest (season 3); 1 episode
2025	El Hotel de los Secretos	Dr. Leo Bustamante	Lead role; web series

== Awards and nominations ==
Award	Category	Work	Result	Ref
2023 MTV MIAW Awards	Reality Star of the Year	Gran Hermano	Won	
BreakTudo Awards 2023	Best Reality Star	Gran Hermano	Won	
BreakTudo Awards 2023	International Crush		Won	
BIC Seven Awards 2024	Latin Reality Star	Gran Hermano	Won	
BreakTudo Awards 2024	International Influencer		Won	
