= Dad for a Day (2009 film) =

- Argentine theatrical release poster
- Directed by: Raúl Rodríguez Peila
- Written by: Jorge Maestro; Fernanda Ramondo; Raúl Rodríguez Peila
- Produced by: Carlos Luis Mentasti; Pablo Bossi
- Starring: Nicolás Cabré; Gimena Accardi; Luisana Lopilato
- Cinematography: Rodrigo Pulpeiro
- Music by: Claudio Waisgluss
- Production companies: INCAA; Telefe; Pampa Films; Royal Cinema Group; Runa Films
- Distributed by: Buena Vista International
- Release dates: August 6, 2009 (Argentina); November 14, 2009 (Mar del Plata Film Festival)
- Running time: 103 minutes
- Country: Argentina
- Language: Spanish
- Box office: $1.866.255 million

Dad for a Day (Spanish: Papá por un día) is a 2009 Argentine sports romantic comedy film starring Nicolás Cabré, Luisana Lopilato, Gimena Accardi and Julieta Poggio in her film debut. It was premiered on 6 August 2009, and was also screened at the Mar del Plata Film Festival on 14 November 2009, not as the part of the competition.

== Plot ==
Federico Villaverde (Nicolás Cabré) is the coach of the female hockey team of a very high-level club. He is engaged to Cecilia (Gimena Accardi), one of the players and the daughter of Luciano Ayerza (Boy Olmi), the owner of the club; when his dying father (Gustavo Garzón), whom he had not seen in ten years, asks him to take care of Tini (Julieta Poggio) his 8-year-old sister, whom he has never met before, things get upside down for him as he tries to adjust this new life. Amidst this situation he meets Julieta (Luisana Lopilato), the captain of the hockey team his father used to coach, and unexpected feelings arise.

== Cast ==
- Nicolás Cabré as Federico Villaverde
- Julieta Poggio as Martina "Tini" Villaverde
- Luisana Lopilato as Julieta Miriotti
- Gimena Accardi as Cecilia Ayerza
- Gustavo Garzón as Eliseo Villaverde
- Gogó Andreu as Lorenzo
- Inés Palombo as Teresa
- Patricia Sosa as Beba
- Nicolás Vázquez as Taxi driver
- Boy Olmi as Luciano Ayerza
- Miguel Ángel Rodríguez as Tito Miriotti
- Joaquín Berthold as Mariano Alerce
- Martín Borisenko as Gonzalo de la Oz
- Mónica Gonzaga as María Inés
- Roberto Dolade as Doctor
- Carlos Kaspar as Kit manager
- Bárbara Diez as Wedding planner

== Reception ==
=== Critical response ===
The newspaper La Nación described the film as "Good", noting that "The plot achieves what it set out to do: to entertain with successful gags, funny dialogues and situations."

While the film critic Ezequiel Boetti from Escribiendo Cine rated it with a score of 4 out of 10, describing it as "a cinematic concoction that includes from sports competitions to the worst clichés in Argentine films.", "an ad infinitum concatenation of the worst things in local filmmaking." and negatively highlighted "the thick writing with which the scriptwriters portrayed the two female leads".

Also 4 out of 10 was the rating of Diego Battle from Otros Cines, who pointed out that "the script by Jorge Maestro is quite disappointing, inferior than -to name a few other works by its author- products like Pelito, La Banda del Golden Rocket or Montaña Rusa. In this very weak film stereotypes, caricatures, simplifications, superficial things and clichés abound. The plot is uninspired, there is not much grace, neither emotion, nor sensitivity, neither humanity nor audacity."

For its part, the newspaper Clarín described it as "Average".

=== Box office ===
The film reached 480,568 viewers, reaching 20th place in the 2009 Argentine box office ranking. Dad for a Day grossed a total of $1.866.255 million.
